= 2008 Humanitarian Bowl =

2008 Roady's Humanitarian Bowl
- Postseason bowl game
Maryland Terrapins	Nevada Wolf Pack
(7–5)	(7–5)
ACC	WAC
42	35
Head coach: Ralph Friedgen	Head coach: Chris Ault
	1	2	3	4	Total
Maryland	13	15	0	14	42
Nevada	14	0	7	14	35
- Date: December 30, 2008
- Season: 2008
- Stadium: Bronco Stadium
- Location: Boise, Idaho
- MVP: Maryland: Da'Rel Scott, RB; Nevada: Colin Kaepernick, QB
- Favorite: Nevada −3
- Referee: Clair Gausman (MW)
- Attendance: 26,781
- Payout: US$750,000 per team

United States TV coverage
- Network: ESPN
- Announcers: Bob Wischusen (play-by-play); Brock Huard (color); Heather Cox (sidelines)
- Nielsen ratings: 2.1

The 2008 Humanitarian Bowl was a postseason college football bowl game between the Maryland Terrapins and the Nevada Wolf Pack on December 30, 2008. It was the two teams' first meeting. The game featured two conference tie-ins: the University of Maryland represented the Atlantic Coast Conference (ACC) and the University of Nevada represented the Western Athletic Conference (WAC). The game was played at Bronco Stadium in Boise, Idaho and was the 12th edition of the Humanitarian Bowl. It was sponsored by the New Plymouth, Idaho-based company Roady's Truck Stops, which claims to be the largest chain of truck stops in the United States.

The featured match-up was between what was called a "wildly inconsistent" Maryland team and the third-best rushing defense and fifth-best total offense of Nevada. The result was an offensive shoot-out. The final score of 42–35 in favor of Maryland exceeded total-points predictions by as much as 17 and tied the all-time Humanitarian Bowl record.

Before the kickoff, seven Maryland players, including six starters, received partial-game suspensions for violating the team's curfew. Maryland took a quick lead within the first two minutes of play, but repeated errors allowed Nevada to remain competitive and the lead changed hands five times. In the second quarter, Nevada's dual-threat quarterback, Colin Kaepernick, was hobbled by an ankle injury that altered the complexion of the game. Nevertheless, Kaepernick remained in the game for almost its entirety and was able to scramble for a touchdown. Halfway through the third quarter, Maryland's leading running back, Da'Rel Scott, made his first appearance of the game. He had been one of the suspended players, but scored twice in the final quarter to help secure a victory for the Terrapins.

== Team selection ==
The ACC had a contractual tie-in with the Humanitarian Bowl that afforded the bowl organizing committee the eighth pick of the conference's bowl-eligible teams. An ACC team participated in the game every year from 2003 to 2008. Before the selections, the ACC announced that 2008 would be the final year of its tie-in with the game due to travel and cost considerations.

The other conference tie-in was with the WAC, which has generally fielded its champion in the game. The WAC has provided a team for the Humanitarian Bowl every year since 2001. Initially, it was speculated that the WAC championship team, Boise State, would make its fifth appearance in the bowl played in its home stadium.

=== Potential "Battle of the Unbeatens" ===
At the end of the regular season, there were three undefeated teams from non-Bowl Championship Series (BCS) conferences, and National Collegiate Athletic Association (NCAA) rules required only one to be given a berth in a BCS game. These three non-BCS teams were Ball State, Boise State, and Utah. The Utes were considered heavy favorites for that berth. In a preemptive move, Humanitarian Bowl officials conducted negotiations with Ball State of the Mid-American Conference (MAC) in an effort to arrange a "Battle of the Unbeatens" with Boise State. If Ball State accepted, presumably with the consent of the ACC, it would have forced a team from the ACC to find an at-large bid. However, Ball State officials were unhappy with the home-field advantage that would have been given to Boise State and the expenses associated with traveling to Idaho. Ball State, which lost the MAC Championship Game and ended its perfect record, declined the overtures and instead met Tulsa in the 2009 GMAC Bowl.

=== ACC team selection ===
In 2008, the ACC experienced a season of unusual parity and fielded an NCAA-record number of ten bowl-eligible teams. Six of those had identical 4–4 conference records, and the remaining four had 5–3 conference records. Among the eligible teams, N.C. State (6–6) had the only non-winning overall record and was therefore forced by NCAA rules to find an at-large berth outside of the ACC tie-in games.

For the 2008 season, the ACC had nine tie-in games. The Orange Bowl was the conference's BCS game and granted an automatic bid to the winner of the ACC Championship Game. The Chick-fil-A Bowl in Atlanta, Georgia had the first-pick of eligible ACC teams after the BCS game, followed by the Gator Bowl in Jacksonville, Florida and the Champs Sports Bowl in Orlando, Florida. The Music City Bowl in Nashville, Tennessee; the Meineke Car Care Bowl in Charlotte, North Carolina; and the Emerald Bowl in San Francisco, California submitted their preferences together, and selected in that order if an agreement between them could not be reached. A special clause also guaranteed that, with a minimum of eight wins, the loser of the championship game would be selected no lower than by the Music City Bowl. The Humanitarian Bowl had the eighth-overall choice followed by the inaugural EagleBank Bowl in Washington, D.C.

That season, an economic recession factored into the selections. In general, bowl officials attempted to select teams in close geographic proximity to compensate for an anticipated drop in ticket sales. Maryland, however, stated that they would not accept a berth to face in-state rival Navy in the nearby EagleBank Bowl due to a conflict with the school's final exams. The Emerald Bowl was not seen as a viable choice due to Maryland's participation in it the year prior.

Maryland head coach Ralph Friedgen made his case to bowl officials by saying that the Terrapins had beaten four of the other five 4–4 teams and not played a game against the fifth, Miami. Three of those teams were selected ahead of Maryland: the Meineke Car Care Bowl selected the nearby North Carolina team; the Gator Bowl chose Clemson, a school with a traditionally well-traveling fanbase; and the Emerald Bowl selected Miami. After the higher-priority bowl games made their selections, the Humanitarian Bowl had the choice of either Maryland or Wake Forest, the school with the smallest enrollment in any BCS football conference. Humanitarian Bowl officials chose Maryland in light of its larger alumni base, well-traveled fans, and greater television marketing potential.

In week 12 of the 2008 season, Maryland had a 7–3 record and stood atop the ACC Atlantic Division. However, the Terps lost their final two regular season games and slid to a four-way tie for third place in the division. Earlier in the season, Maryland defeated four ranked opponents, a feat surpassed only by the two teams that played in the BCS National Championship Game, Florida and Oklahoma—and those each played an extra game with their conference championships. Maryland spent three weeks ranked in the top-25 of the Associated Press Poll.

=== WAC team selection ===
At the end of the 2008 season, the WAC had six bowl-eligible teams, five of which participated in bowl games. The WAC had three conference tie-ins: the New Mexico Bowl in Albuquerque, New Mexico; the Hawaii Bowl in Honolulu, Hawaii; and the Humanitarian Bowl. Additionally, the WAC had provisions for conditional participation in the Poinsettia Bowl in San Diego, California; the Independence Bowl in Shreveport, Louisiana; and the GMAC Bowl in Mobile, Alabama.

In the past, the Humanitarian Bowl usually selected the WAC championship team. However, Boise State was not content to play a middle-grade ACC team after negotiations with Ball State failed. The WAC commissioner said that the Broncos would look for another match-up that had "the same type of sizzle" as a match-up against Ball State. The Idaho Statesman added that "The Terrapins don't 'sizzle.'" Boise State traveled to the Poinsettia Bowl, where they faced 11th-ranked TCU, which had lost only to the BCS-bound Oklahoma and Utah teams.

In Nevada's final regular season game, Kaepernick led the Wolf Pack in a second-half comeback to defeat Louisiana Tech. The seventh win guaranteed Nevada a berth in one of the three WAC tie-in bowls. The Wolf Pack finished the season in a three-way tie for second place in the WAC alongside Hawaii and Louisiana Tech. Hawaii had a standing contract with the home-town Hawaii Bowl where it played Notre Dame. Louisiana Tech, having lost to both Nevada and Hawaii, appeared unlikely to be selected for a bowl at all. However, the Bulldogs were able to take advantage of a provisional WAC berth in the Independence Bowl since neither the Big 12 nor the Southeastern Conference could provide eligible teams. Two other WAC teams achieved bowl eligibility with 6–6 records. Fresno State secured a slot in the New Mexico Bowl, but San Jose State was unable to find an at-large berth.

With Boise State's decision to decline the Humanitarian Bowl invitation, the organizing committee looked to Nevada. Like Maryland, Nevada ended the regular season with a 7–5 record. The Wolf Pack's schedule included losses against then sixth-ranked Missouri, ninth-ranked Boise State, and 12th-ranked Texas Tech. Nevada finished the regular season ranked second nationally in rushing offense and fifth in total offense. The Wolf Pack had two 1,000-yard rushers: dual-threat quarterback Colin Kaepernick and running back Vai Taua. Kaepernick also threw for more than 2,000 yards.

On December 7, 2008, the Humanitarian Bowl officially extended invitations to Maryland and Nevada, both of which were accepted.

== Pre-game buildup ==
=== Location ===
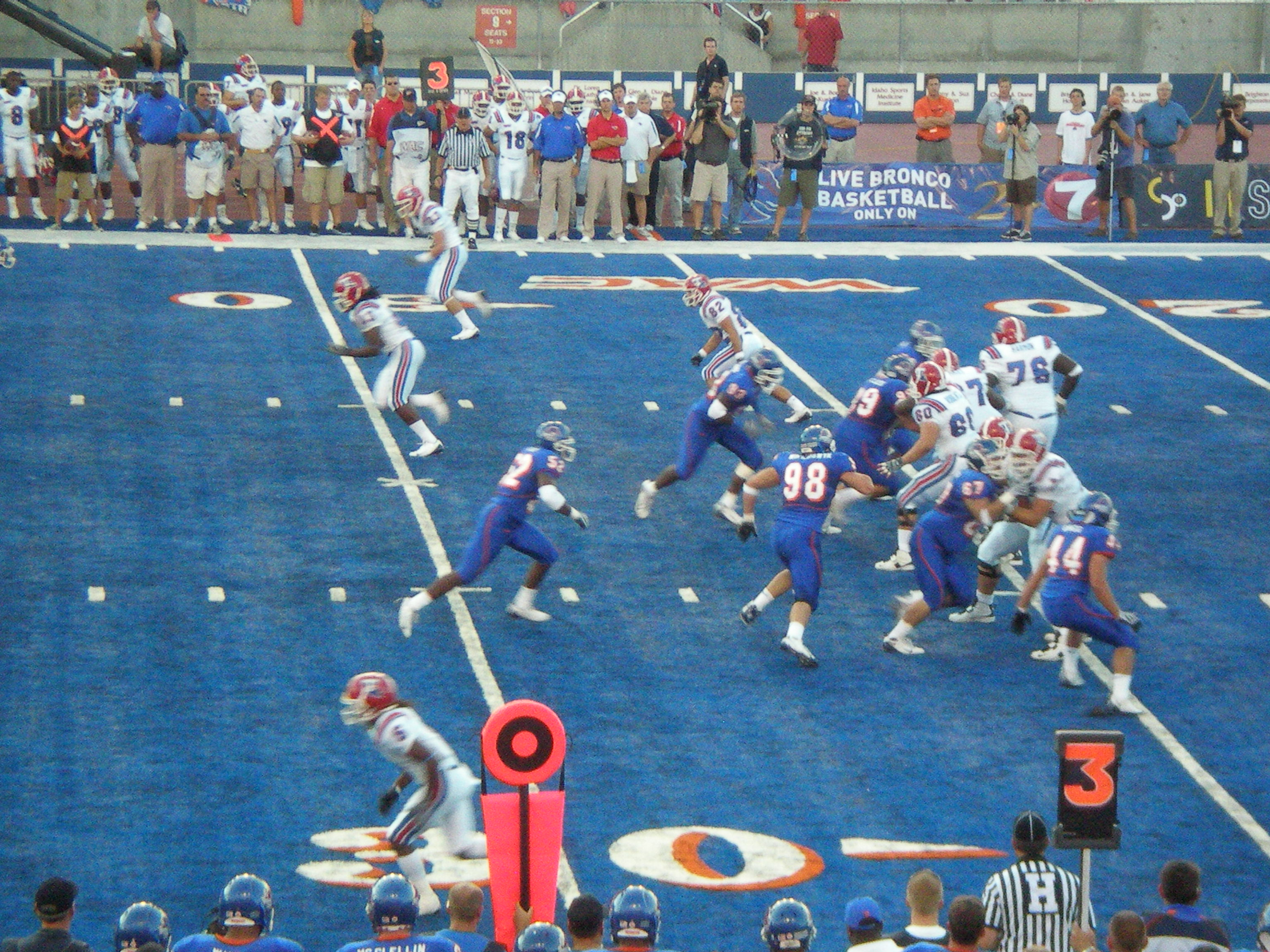
A Boise State game on the blue turf

The site of the game was Bronco Stadium in Boise, Idaho, the home field of Boise State University. The field's blue artificial turf has the distinction of being the only non-green playing field in use by a Division I Football Bowl Subdivision team. Due to the color of its field, the stadium is nicknamed "The Blue" and the field itself is sometimes colloquially referred to as "smurf turf".

Pundits and opponents have asserted that Boise State benefits from an added advantage by wearing their blue home uniforms to match the playing field. Boise State had a 64–2 record at Bronco Stadium from 1998 to 2008. Nevada, designated as the home team, likewise wore blue uniforms during the Humanitarian Bowl.

ACC teams viewed a berth in the Humanitarian Bowl as undesirable due to its location. Aside from being one of the lower priority tie-ins, the destination is far outside the conference's geographic footprint. Travel costs from the East Coast are prohibitively expensive and historically caused low turnout among ACC fans. In addition, the game is hosted at a cold-weather venue, which is a disadvantage in comparison with ACC bowl games in places such as Florida, California, and Georgia.

The game historically relied on local ticket sales, and the participating schools struggled to sell their allotted tickets. On December 8, a Boise-area television news station reported that Maryland and Nevada had sold just sixteen and eight tickets, respectively. The story was widely circulated by sports-related blogs, but the figures were discredited by a Maryland official. On December 18, the Reno Gazette-Journal reported that 100 tickets had been sold by Nevada. Maryland officials admitted that ticket sales among its fans were expected to be low, with one stating they were in the "mid-hundreds" a week and a half from the game date. According to a Baltimore Sun reporter, Maryland's final ticket figure was about 800. By comparison, Clemson sold about 3,500 tickets for the 2001 Humanitarian Bowl, and Georgia Tech sold about 250 tickets for the 2007 Humanitarian Bowl.

=== Team comparison ===
Maryland	Statistical comparison	Nevada
Records (Note: Strength of schedule is based upon USA Today's Sagarin rating index.)
7–5	Overall	7–5
4–4	Conference	5–3
6–1 / 1–4	Home / away	3–3 / 4–2
46th	Strength of schedule	71st
Offense (Note: Scoring offense and scoring defense is annotated in terms of points per game. All other measurements of offense and defense are in yards per game. National rankings among Division I FBS teams are annotated in parentheses (out of 120 teams).)
341.9 ^{(76th)}	Total offense	510.6 ^{(5th)}
207.4 ^{(65th)}	Passing offense	219.2 ^{(52nd)}
134.5 ^{(72nd)}	Rushing offense	291.4 ^{(2nd)}
20.1 ^{(100th)}	Scoring offense	37.8 ^{(13th)}
Defense
355.0 ^{(60th)}	Total defense	395.6 ^{(92nd)}
205.6 ^{(57th)}	Passing defense	321.1 ^{(120th)}
149.4 ^{(74th)}	Rushing defense	74.5 ^{(3rd)}
21.4 ^{(37th)}	Scoring defense	31.5 ^{(99th)}

Predictions for the game varied, but generally favored Nevada with Maryland as the underdog. Several publications, including Sports Illustrated, named Nevada as three-point favorites in spread betting. ESPN's ACC correspondent predicted Nevada to win by 21 points. Las Vegas betting firms assigned Nevada as 0.5- to 3.0-point favorites. The over-under was predicted to be between 60.0 and 62.0 points.

Under head coach Ralph Friedgen, Maryland had earned a reputation for inconsistency, sometimes even being referred to as "schizophrenic". During the regular season, the Terrapins managed to beat four of the five top-25 teams they faced: 23rd-ranked California, 20th-ranked Clemson, 21st-ranked Wake Forest, and 16th-ranked North Carolina. All those teams subsequently participated in bowl games. However, Maryland also lost to teams they were expected to defeat. They lost by ten points to 12.5-point underdogs Middle Tennessee State. Maryland suffered a 31-point shut-out against Virginia, a team (then 1–3) that had lost to Duke, 31–3, the week prior.

Nevada suffered three of its five losses against then top-twelve ranked teams. They lost to Big 12 Championship runner-up Missouri and Texas Tech, which, in midseason, was in contention for the national championship and was led by Heisman Trophy prospect Graham Harrell. Nevada managed a close game against Boise State. The Wolf Pack lost by seven points to a team that recorded an average 21.4-point margin of victory in a perfect 12–0 regular season. Boise State preserved victory when a Hail Mary pass from Kaepernick was broken up in the final seconds. Nevada, however, was also accused of inconsistent play. The Wolf Pack suffered a home loss to "perennial WAC bottom-feeder" New Mexico State, 48–45.

==== Maryland offense vs. Nevada defense ====
Maryland's offense was run by first-year offensive coordinator and former wide receivers coach James Franklin, who utilized a West Coast system. During the 2008 regular season, starting quarterback Chris Turner threw for 2,318 yards, 11 touchdowns, and 10 interceptions. NFL draft prospect Darrius Heyward-Bey accumulated 561 receiving yards in ten games. Heyward-Bey also recorded 208 rushing yards and was often utilized in reverses and other trick plays due to his breakaway speed. Maryland had another offensive weapon in running back Da'Rel Scott, who ran for 959 yards during the regular season. Overall, the rushing offense gained 134.5 yards per game and was ranked 72nd in the nation. Against Virginia Tech and Boston College, Maryland rushed for −12 and −6 yards, respectively. The previous year, in the 2007 Emerald Bowl against Oregon State, Maryland recorded 19 yards on the ground against the then second-ranked rushing defense.

About Maryland, Nevada head coach Chris Ault said, "Their offense to me is very balanced. They can run the ball and do a good job. With [quarterback Chris] Turner, they split out and they have some nice receivers. Whereas Missouri was going to throw it as much as Texas Tech did, I think Maryland is probably one of the more balanced teams we've played this year."

The Maryland offense faced first-year defensive coordinator Nigel Burton's Nevada defense. It ranked third in the nation against the run, allowing 74.5 rushing yards per game, but was last (120th) in the nation in passing defense, allowing an average of 321.1 passing yards per game. Nevada was ranked eighth in the number of quarterback sacks with 35. Kevin Basped, ranked tenth in the nation in sacks, and Dontay Moch, ranked fifteenth, accumulated more than nine each. Maryland quarterback Turner was sacked 11 times in the Terrapins' last two games against Florida State and Boston College. Nevada was also ranked sixth nationally in tackles for loss, with an average of 8.0 per game.

==== Nevada offense vs. Maryland defense ====
In 2008, Nevada typically ran an offensive scheme referred to as the "pistol offense", a system that was pioneered by head coach Chris Ault. In the pistol offense, the quarterback lines up four yards directly behind the center and with a running back directly behind the quarterback. Under the system, the offense attempts to keep the opposing defense off balance by diversifying the types of plays that can be run, with a focus on running up the middle, "quarterback keepers" in which the passer runs the ball, and play action passes where the quarterback fakes a hand-off before throwing to a receiver. It aims to create man-to-man match-ups with the receivers and compensate for an undersized offensive line. With the running back obscured from view by the quarterback, it can also create confusion for the opposing linebackers and allow more effective deception, which is critical to play-action fakes.

The system worked well during the regular season. Nevada starting quarterback and 2008 WAC Offensive Player of the Year Colin Kaepernick ran for more than 1,100 yards and 16 touchdowns in addition to passing for 2,479 yards and 19 touchdowns. Alongside Kaepernick, Nevada's rushing offense was led by running back Vai Taua, who ran for 1,420 yards and 14 touchdowns. With two 1,000-yard rushers for the first time in school history, Nevada ran for an average of 291.4 yards per game. Nevada was ranked fifth nationally in terms of total offense, averaging 510.6 yards per game.

With regards to facing the pistol offense, Maryland head coach Ralph Friedgen said, "If we can keep our assignments and tackle, we'll be OK. One missed tackle could be a big play ... With the throwing game, there could be a lot of one-on-one situations. To me, it's pick your poison. What they do best is run it. What we'd like to do is get them off schedule. If they mix it, then we're in trouble."

Nevada coach Ault said, "I think the Maryland defense is as physical as Missouri's was." Kaepernick said, "You notice how disciplined and how hard they play. They're never out of alignment. If they're supposed to be somewhere, they're going to be there and they're going to be ready to make a play. When plays come their way, they make them. That's something we have to be ready for. We have to find a weakness and exploit it."

=== Personnel changes ===
==== Maryland coaching changes ====
After Maryland's last regular-season game, defensive coordinator Chris Cosh and tight ends coach and special teams assistant Danny Pearman announced their resignations. Cosh returned to Kansas State, where he had coached before Maryland, to assume defensive play-calling duties under recently re-hired head coach Bill Snyder. Danny Pearman returned to his alma mater, Clemson, to work for Dabo Swinney, who had been promoted from offensive coordinator to interim head coach and, finally, head coach for the Tigers. For the bowl game, Maryland's defensive line coach, Al Seamonson, was named as the interim defensive coordinator. Third-year intern Brian White filled in for Pearman as the interim tight ends coach and would assist head coach Friedgen in running the special teams.

==== Maryland player suspensions ====
Shortly before the game, Maryland head coach Ralph Friedgen placed partial-game suspensions on seven players who violated the team's pre-bowl curfew. The suspended players were linebackers Moise Fokou, Trey Covington, Antwine Perez, and Derek Drummond, cornerback Jamari McCollough, the quarterback's preferred third-down wide receiver Danny Oquendo, and leading running back Da'Rel Scott. All except Drummond were regular starters. Consequently, a much younger line-up started for Maryland, including, according to Friedgen, some who probably would not have seen playing time otherwise.

Friedgen stated that the curfew violations occurred over several nights, and that different players violated the rule to separate degrees. He informed Maryland athletic director Deborah Yow of the infractions and initially suggested sending all the curfew violators back to Maryland by bus. Yow dissented, and they agreed to suspend the players for part of the game. Describing the incident, Friedgen said that "Five percent of [the] guys thought they didn't need to listen to me, that they could get bed checked and sneak out." He added, "But I checked again at 1 o'clock. "This is not my first rodeo."

== Game summary ==
The 2008 Humanitarian Bowl kicked off at 2:30 p.m. Mountain Time on Tuesday, December 30, 2008, in front of a crowd of 26,781 spectators at Bronco Stadium in Boise, Idaho. The weather conditions were cloudy with a temperature of 38 °F (3 °C) and wind at eight mph (12.9 km/h) from the southeast. The officiating staff consisted of referee Clair Gausman, umpire Rico Orsot, linesman Cal McNeill, line judge Gary McNanna, back judge Tom Bessant, field judge Shane Standley, side judge Kim Nelson, and scorer Mike Cannon. The game was televised on ESPN and drew a television rating of 2.1 for an estimated 3,039,000 viewers. It was a 218% increase in television viewers from the previous season's game.

=== First quarter ===
The game started with Maryland receiving the kickoff, which Kenny Tate returned 17 yards to the Terrapins' 35-yard line. Quarterback Chris Turner threw a short pass to Torrey Smith, bringing the ball to the Maryland 41-yard line, and then threw an incomplete pass. On third down with three yards to go, Turner connected with freshman Adrian Cannon for a 59-yard touchdown pass. However, placekicker Obi Egekeze missed the extra point.

In subsequent possessions, Nevada and Maryland both failed to gain first downs and exchanged punts. Nevada quarterback Colin Kaepernick then led a drive that included a 68-yard pass to the Maryland three-yard line. The Terrapins' defense stopped two rushing attempts by Vai Taua, but a short pass to wide receiver Chris Wellington was completed for Nevada's first touchdown. With the extra point, Nevada took the lead, 7–6. Wolf Pack placekicker Brett Jaekle executed a 69-yard kickoff to Torrey Smith, and he returned it 99 yards for a second Maryland touchdown. Egekeze made the extra point and Maryland regained the lead, 13–7, with 7:53 remaining in the quarter.

On the ensuing kickoff, Egekeze attempted to kick the ball as it fell off the tee. This resulted in an unintentional squib that was returned 36 yards to the Terps' nine-yard line. Nevada's Kaepernick attempted to rush but was stopped for no gain. On the next play, he threw the ball into the end zone, but it was intercepted by Maryland safety Kenny Tate, resulting in a touchback. The Terps started on their own 20-yard line, and running back Davin Meggett rushed for 13 yards and a first down. Turner then linked up with freshman receiver Ronnie Tyler for another first down at the Maryland 49-yard line. After a false start penalty, the Terps were unable to gain a first down and punted the ball away. The ball rolled into the end zone for a touchback, and Nevada started the final drive of the quarter at its 20-yard line. Kaepernick then passed for two first downs, picked up another due to a pass interference call against Maryland, and scrambled for yet another. He then handed off to Taua, who rushed 17 yards for a touchdown. Nevada re-took the lead, 14–13, with 46 seconds remaining in the quarter.

Nevada's Jaekle made a short kick-off, and Maryland tight end Dan Gronkowski returned the ball eight yards to the Maryland 44-yard line. On the final play of the quarter, Turner handed the ball off to sophomore running back Morgan Green, who picked up three yards. The quarter ended with Nevada leading, 14–13.

=== Second quarter ===
The second quarter began with Maryland in possession at its 47-yard line. On the first play of the quarter, Turner handed off to Green, who broke free of the Nevada defense for a 53-yard gain and a touchdown. The score and extra point gave Maryland a six-point lead, 20–14, with 14:50 remaining in the first half.

Nevada and Maryland then exchanged punts three times, and the Wolf Pack punted it away a fourth time. In the span of two series, Kaepernick was sacked three times, once each by linebackers Dave Philistin, Alex Wujciak, and Adrian Moten. As a result, Kaepernick suffered an ankle sprain and played the rest of the game, but he noticeably favored his uninjured side. The Terps took over on their 47-yard line with 0:29 remaining in the half. Turner completed an eight-yard pass to Ronnie Tyler, and a Nevada hit out-of-bounds resulted in a 15-yard penalty against Nevada and a first down for Maryland. After two incomplete passes, Turner then converted on third down again with a toss to Tyler for 16 yards and then once more for 14 yards and a touchdown to bring the score to 26–14 in Maryland's favor. The Terps elected to attempt a two-point conversion, and Turner completed a pass to a wide-open Meggett in the right side of the end zone. With six seconds remaining in the first half, Maryland had a 28–14 lead. Nevada received Maryland's kickoff, but elected to run out the clock and head into halftime.

=== Third quarter ===
Maryland kicked off to Nevada to start the second half, and the teams again exchanged punts twice. Kaepernick sat out the next series due to his sprained ankle. Backup quarterback Nick Graziano took over but was unable to complete two passes and Nevada punted a third time. In the next series, Turner threw an interception to Nevada safety Jonathan Amaya, who returned it for 33 yards to the Maryland 22-yard line, then fumbled. The ball was recovered by Nevada, and Kaepernick capitalized on the turnover with a 17-yard touchdown pass to Taua, narrowing Nevada's deficit to 28–21.

Jaekle kicked off to the Maryland 30-yard line where it was returned by Green for two yards. A fresh Da'Rel Scott then made his first appearance in the game. He carried the ball four times in succession to advance to the Nevada 46-yard line. On third down with nine yards to go, Turner was sacked by defensive lineman Kevin Basped and the ball was knocked loose. It was picked up by Wolf Pack linebacker Brandon Marshall who then also fumbled. Maryland offensive lineman Scott Burley recovered it on the Nevada 45-yard line. The alternating changes in possession gave Maryland a first down, and Turner then connected with Darrius Heyward-Bey on an 11-yard pass for another first down. Scott rushed twice to pick up a first down at the Nevada 23-yard line. After a rush by Meggett, Turner was sacked by defensive end Dontay Moch and again fumbled. This time, Nevada recovered the ball and retained possession. Kaepernick then passed to wide receiver Mike McCoy for 38 yards to the Maryland 27-yard line. Vai Taua picked up seven yards on a rush attempt, and the quarter came to an end with Maryland leading, 28–21.

=== Fourth quarter ===
The fourth quarter began with Nevada in possession at the Maryland 20-yard line. The first play of the quarter was a rush attempt by Taua, but he fumbled and recovered the ball for a loss of one yard. On the second play of the quarter, Kaepernick completed a 21-yard touchdown pass to wide receiver Marko Mitchell, tying the score at 28–28.

Following the Nevada kickoff, Turner handed off to Scott, who picked up two yards. After an incomplete pass, Turner connected with Torrey Smith on a 26-yard toss for a third-down conversion. Scott then rushed for three yards to the Nevada 49-yard line, and carried it again down the middle, this time breaking free for a 49-yard touchdown run. On the following Nevada series, Kaepernick mounted a 38-yard drive to the Maryland 34-yard line, but failed to convert on fourth and 12. On the next series, Da'Rel Scott was handed the ball four times in succession to pick up first downs with rushes of 11, 23, 30 yards and a touchdown on a two-yard run. The score and extra point gave Maryland a two-touchdown lead, 42–28. Nevada's offense returned to the field with 7:44 remaining in the game and used almost three minutes in a 37-yard drive that culminated in an interception by Maryland safety Jeff Allen on the Maryland 38-yard line. After no gain on a rush by running back Morgan Green, Maryland attempted an end-around. Turner was stepped on, and the handoff was botched. The intended recipient, Heyward-Bey, dropped the ball but managed to recover it for a loss of six yards. After Nevada called a time out, Green rushed for a five-yard gain. Nevada expended its last remaining time out to stop the clock with 4:06 left. Maryland punted it away on fourth down with 11 yards to go.

Kaepernick took over on the Nevada 23-yard line with 4:01 and made four completions to drive to the Terps' 15-yard line. Exploiting a large opening, Kaepernick held onto the ball and ran it into the end zone to narrow Maryland's lead to one touchdown, 42–35, with 2:19 remaining. Jaekle attempted an onside kick in an effort to give Nevada another chance on offense, but the ball was recovered by Maryland receiver Danny Oquendo. Scott rushed for two and then 19 yards. With the first down, Maryland had enough time to run out the clock and clinch the 42–35 victory.

=== Scoring summary ===
Scoring summary

Quarter	Time	Drive			Team	Scoring information	Score	
Quarter	Time	Plays	Yards	TOP	Team	Scoring information	Maryland	Nevada
1	13:59	3	66	1:01	Maryland	Adrian Cannon 59-yard touchdown reception from Chris Turner, Obi Egekeze kick no good (miss right)	6	0
1	8:06	6	83	2:23	Nevada	Chris Wellington 1-yard touchdown reception from Colin Kaepernick, Brett Jaekle kick good	6	7
1	7:53				Maryland	Kickoff returned 99 yards for touchdown by Torrey Smith, Obi Egekeze kick good	13	7
1	0:46	7	80	3:09	Nevada	Vai Taua 17-yard touchdown run, Brett Jaekle kick good	13	14
2	14:50	2	56	0:56	Maryland	Morgan Green 53-yard touchdown run, Obi Egekeze kick good	20	14
2	0:06	5	53	0:23	Maryland	Ronnie Tyler 14-yard touchdown reception from Chris Turner, 2-point pass good	28	14
3	5:58	3	22	0:55	Nevada	Vai Taua 17-yard touchdown reception from Colin Kaepernick, Brett Jaekle kick good	28	21
4	14:13	5	65	1:40	Nevada	Marko Mitchell 21-yard touchdown reception from Colin Kaepernick, Brett Jaekle kick good	28	28
4	12:21	5	80	1:52	Maryland	Da'Rel Scott 49-yard touchdown run, Obi Egekeze kick good	35	28
4	7:44	4	66	1:04	Maryland	Da'Rel Scott 2-yard touchdown run, Obi Egekeze kick good	42	28
4	2:19	9	77	1:42	Nevada	Colin Kaepernick 15-yard touchdown run, Brett Jaekle kick good	42	35
"TOP" = time of possession. For other American football terms, see Glossary of American football.							42	35

== Statistics ==
Statistical comparison
	Maryland	Nevada
1st downs	19	26
3rd down conversions	4/14	8/18
4th down conversions	0/0	0/1
Total yards	456	484
Passing yards	198	370
Rushing yards	258	114
Penalties	6–50	4–35
Turnovers	3	3
Time of possession	28:47	31:13

The 2008 Humanitarian Bowl Most Valuable Player honors were awarded to Maryland running back Da'Rel Scott, who rushed for 174 yards, and Nevada quarterback Colin Kaepernick, who threw for 370 yards. Each was the statistical leader at his respective position, and Scott scored Maryland's two final touchdowns to break the 28–28 stalemate. Scott also was able to help Maryland clinch the victory in the final minutes by rushing for a first down that allowed the team to run out the clock.

=== Records ===
The 77 points scored in the game tied the Humanitarian Bowl record for total points, which had been set in 1998 by Idaho and Southern Miss.

Nevada quarterback Colin Kaepernick set the Humanitarian Bowl passing yardage record with 370 yards through the air, and he scored three touchdowns in the process. Despite the loss, Kaepernick's team outperformed Maryland in terms of passing yardage, total offense, first downs, and time of possession.

Maryland freshman wide receiver Torrey Smith, with his 99-yard kickoff return, broke the all-time Atlantic Coast Conference single-season kickoff return yards record with 1,089 yards. Smith also broke the Humanitarian Bowl kick return record, which was previously 98 yards.

With 174 yards, Da'Rel Scott set the Maryland record for rushing yards in a bowl game, despite playing just one and a half quarters due to his curfew suspension. The previous record was 165 yards, set by Lu Gambino in Maryland's first bowl game, the 1948 Gator Bowl. Scott also broke the 1,000 yards-per-season barrier, making him one of just seven players in school history to do so. Scott said earlier in the year that reaching the 1,000-yard benchmark was a personal goal he set for the 2008 season. Between Scott and Davin Meggett, Maryland also came the closest it ever has to having both a 1,000- and 500-yard rusher in the same season. Meggett fell just 43 yards shy of the 500-yard mark.

Nevada set a school record for single-season total offensive yards, recording 6,611 in 2008. This surpassed the previous record of 6,263 yards, set in 1995.

=== Maryland statistical recap ===
Individual leaders
Maryland Passing
	Cmp/att	Yds	TD	Int
Chris Turner	13 / 27	198	2	1
Maryland Rushing
	Carries	Yds	TD	Lg
Da'Rel Scott	14	174	2	49
Morgan Green	10	72	1	53
Maryland Receiving
	Recep.	Yds	TD	Lg
Adrian Cannon	1	59	1	59
Ronnie Tyler	5	55	1	16

Four Maryland backups who saw significant playing time due to the suspensions scored touchdowns: second-string slot receiver Ronnie Tyler, second-string X-receiver Torrey Smith, third-string slot receiver Adrian Cannon, and third-string running back Morgan Green.

Maryland compiled 456 yards of total offense: 198 in the air and 258 yards on the ground. Quarterback Chris Turner completed passes to five receivers during the game: Ronnie Tyler (five), Darrius Heyward-Bey (four), Torrey Smith (two), Adrian Cannon (one), and Emani Lee-Odai (one). Cannon and Tyler each caught a pass for a touchdown. Running back Davin Meggett caught a pass for a two-point conversion. Turner also threw one interception.

On the ground, rushing attempts were made by running backs Da'Rel Scott (14 for 174 yards), Morgan Green (10 for 72 yards), and Davin Meggett (10 for 35 yards). Wide receiver Heyward-Bey also made a rushing attempt, but dropped the ball and recovered it for a loss of six yards.

Maryland had previously shown an ability to strike quickly on offense and did so again in the game. In the 2008 season, the team scored 18 out of 28 touchdowns in drives consisting of six or fewer plays or less than two minutes of game time. This led to the team often trailing opponents in time of possession. In the Humanitarian Bowl, Maryland continued the pattern by scoring in the first 1:01 with a 59-yard Chris Turner pass to Adrian Cannon. Maryland had possession for 2:26 less than Nevada.

Maryland, which was third-best in the ACC in third down attempts (40.4%), did comparatively poorly during the game, converting only four of 14 third downs (28.6%).

Defensively, Maryland was able to hold the nation's third-ranked rushing offense to just 114 yards on the ground. Nevada quarterback Kaepernick, who ran for 1,115 yards, was held to just 19 rushing yards, 15 of which were gained during a touchdown run. Two players made their first career interceptions: true freshman safety Kenny Tate and senior defensive back Jeff Allen. Tate's interception in the Maryland end zone prevented a Nevada score, while Allen's interception with 4:54 remaining helped seal the victory for Maryland. Offensive lineman Scott Burley forced a fumble against Nevada linebacker Brandon Marshall, who had recovered a third-down fumble by Turner. Burley subsequently recovered the forced fumble and gave Maryland a first down.

Maryland's special teams recorded one touchdown when Torrey Smith returned a kickoff for 99 yards. After the first touchdown of the game, senior placekicker Obi Egekeze missed an extra point for the first time in his career. Early in the season, Egekeze missed his first five field goal attempts, but, prior to the Humanitarian Bowl, he had made all 64 extra-point attempts of his career. After the first failed kick, Egekeze made the other five extra-point attempts of the game. The placekicker also erred when he attempted to kick the ball as it fell off the tee, resulting in a short 15-yard kick which was returned 36 yards by Nevada to the Maryland nine-yard line.

=== Nevada statistical recap ===
Individual leaders
Nevada Passing
	Cmp/att	Yds	TD	Int
Colin Kaepernick	24 / 47	370	3	2
Nevada Rushing
	Carries	Yds	TD	Lg
Vai Taua	23	101	1	25
Colin Kaepernick	9	15	1	19
Nevada Receiving
	Recep.	Yds	TD	Lg
Mike McCoy	13	172	0	38
Marko Mitchell	5	130	1	68

Nevada recorded better statistics than Maryland in several areas despite ultimately losing the game. The Wolf Pack compiled seven more first downs, 172 more passing yards, 28 more total offensive yards, 15 fewer penalty yards, 15.8% more third down conversions, and 2:26 more time in possession of the ball.

In the passing game, Colin Kaepernick achieved a 51.1% pass completion rate (24 out of 47). He threw for 370 yards, including three touchdowns. He completed passes to Mike McCoy (13), Marko Mitchell (five), Chris Wellington (three), Arthur King Jr. (two), and Vai Taua (one). Mitchell, Wellington, and Taua each caught a pass for a touchdown. Due to Kaepernick's injury, backup quarterback Nick Graziano played for one series but was unable to make a completion on two attempts.

On the ground, Nevada struggled against the Maryland defense, recording 114 rushing yards, far fewer than its 291.4 per game average. Running plays were attempted by Kaepernick and Taua, who made 23 carries for 101 yards and one touchdown. Despite suffering from a sprained ankle, Kaepernick also was able to scamper 15 yards for a rushing touchdown.

Conversely, the Nevada defense had difficulty stopping the Maryland run. Nevada's rush defense allowed 258 yards, compared with its regular-season average of just 74.5 yards allowed per game. This was especially true after a well-rested Da'Rel Scott entered the game in the middle of the third quarter. Head coach Chris Ault said, "He just ran through us like we weren't there." Defensive back Jonathan Amaya intercepted a Chris Turner pass for his fourth interception of the season.

Brett Jaekle handled all of Nevada's kicking duties. He made all five extra-point attempts. Jaekle punted eight times for 295 yards and kicked off five times for 270 yards. With 1:42 remaining, he attempted an onside kick, but the ball was recovered by Maryland's Danny Oquendo.

== Post-game effects ==
With the bowl game, Maryland finished the season with an 8–5 record. The win was Maryland's 600th in school history. Ralph Friedgen's postseason record improved to 4–2, which gave him twice as many bowl wins as any other head coach in school history. For the 2008 season, Maryland stood 5–1 in games decided by seven points or less and 8–0 in games kicked off during daylight hours. Nevada posted a final record of 7–6. The game was the third consecutive postseason loss for Chris Ault and Nevada.

== See also ==
- American football positions
- Glossary of American football
