= Da'Rel Scott =

American gridiron football player (born 1988)

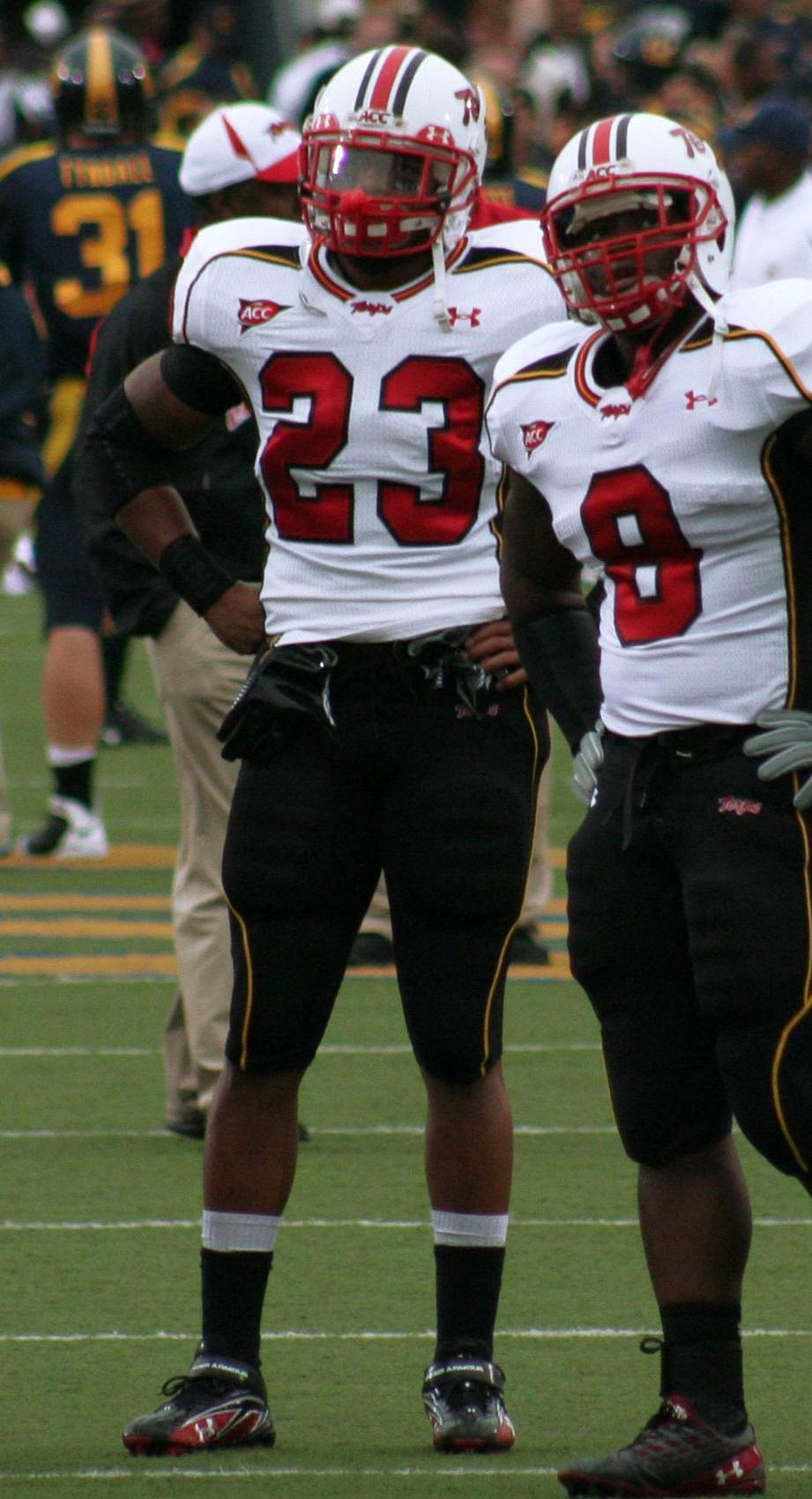
- Scott during his time at Maryland

No. 34, 33
- Position: Running back

Personal information
- Born: May 26, 1988 (age 38); Conshohocken, Pennsylvania, U.S.
- Listed height: 5 ft 11 in (1.80 m)
- Listed weight: 210 lb (95 kg)

Career information
- High school: Plymouth-Whitemarsh (Plymouth Meeting, Pennsylvania)
- College: Maryland
- NFL draft: 2011: 7th round, 221st overall pick

Career history
- New York Giants (2011–2013); Winnipeg Blue Bombers (2015); Hamilton Tiger-Cats (2016)

Awards and highlights
- Super Bowl champion (XLVI); First-team All-ACC (2008); All-ACC freshman team (2007); Humanitarian Bowl MVP; Military Bowl MVP

Career NFL statistics
- Rushing attempts: 31
- Rushing yards: 98
- Receptions: 13
- Receiving yards: 115
- Receiving touchdowns: 1
- Stats at Pro Football Reference

Da'Rel Scott (born May 26, 1988) is an American former professional football player who was a running back in the National Football League (NFL). He was selected in the seventh round of the 2011 NFL draft by the New York Giants. He played college football for the Maryland Terrapins. During the 2008 season, he was the second-leading rusher in the Atlantic Coast Conference, behind Jonathan Dwyer of Georgia Tech.

Scott played high school football as a running back and free safety at Plymouth-Whitemarsh High School. He was moderately recruited, but Scout.com thought he was more suited to the position of wide receiver or cornerback at the intercollegiate level. In 2006, he enrolled at the University of Maryland, College Park, where he was moved to wide receiver, but he spent the entire season on redshirt status. The following season, he saw limited action as a reserve running back behind starters Lance Ball and Keon Lattimore. He also played on special teams as a kickoff returner, which was the coaching staff's attempt to get him on the field in some capacity because of his speed (4.31 seconds in the 40-yard dash and sub 10.5 seconds in the 100 meters)

In 2008, Scott took over as Maryland's starting running back and spent much of the season as the leading rusher in the Atlantic Coast Conference (ACC). He was eventually surpassed by Dwyer, although both players were named to the All-ACC first-team at the season's end. Scott also became the 2008 Humanitarian Bowl most valuable player when he broke the University of Maryland bowl game rushing record, and he finished the season with 1,133 rushing yards, the seventh Terrapin player to surpass a thousand yards in a single season.

== Early life ==
Scott was born on May 26, 1988, in Conshohocken, Pennsylvania, to Gloria and Lee Scott Sr. He has two older brothers, Lee Scott Jr., who played football as a defensive back at La Salle, and James, who ran track at Saint Joseph's. When Da'Rel Scott was eight years old, his parents had a falling out, which prompted his father to leave the family. Thereafter, Lee Scott Sr. was no longer involved in raising his sons and would often miss scheduled visits. Da'Rel Scott said, "He just kept letting me down. Just day by day, I was thinking, 'I need a father figure in my life.'" In high school, his attitude changed, and he said, "I don't need him." Despite the absence of his biological father, Scott grew up with the support of his mother, two brothers Lee and James, cousin Leroy, family friend and youth football coach Mike Shaw, and high school athletic director Charlie Forster.

He attended Plymouth Whitemarsh High School in Plymouth Meeting, Pennsylvania, where he was a four-year letterwinner in football, track, and basketball. In football, Scott was a three-year starter and played as both a tailback and free safety. During his senior year, he rushed for 2,523 yards and 38 touchdowns on 232 attempts. As both a junior and senior, he received the Maxwell Award for the conference player of the year. As a senior, The Times Herald named him the area player of the year, the Associated Press named him an all-state player, and he was invited to the Big 33 Football Classic all-star game. SuperPrep named him an all-region player. Rivals.com rated him a four-star prospect and assessed him as the 21st-ranked "athlete" recruit in the nation. Scout.com assessed him as a three-star prospect, and wrote of him, "This kid can flat out fly. He runs a sub 10.5 100 meters, and a sub 21.0 200 meters. Scott needs to get physically bigger to be a college running back; he may project better as a wide receiver or cornerback." Scott received scholarship offers from Georgia Tech, Penn State, Virginia, and his ultimate choice, Maryland. In 2006, he enrolled at the University of Maryland, where he studied kinesiology.

== College career ==
=== 2006 season ===
Scott sat out the 2006 season as a redshirt. After summer training camp, the coaching staff moved Scott to wide receiver, a position that lacked depth, but head coach Ralph Friedgen said that Scott had some difficulty making the adjustment. He was, however, named the offensive scout team player of the week for his performance in the practices before the Florida State game.

=== 2007 season ===
During 2007 spring practice, Scott was third on the depth chart, but suffered a left knee injury, which forced him to miss most of camp. During the 2007 season, he played in nine games as a reserve tailback behind Lance Ball and Keon Lattimore and as a kickoff returner. Despite the team's abundance of running backs, Friedgen wanted to utilize Scott in some capacity because of his speed, which had been recorded at 4.25 seconds in the 40-yard dash. Maryland wide receiver Darrius Heyward-Bey said, "On paper it says I'm faster, but Da'Rel, he's just a different type of animal." Against Wake Forest, he saw his first action when he returned four kickoffs for 101 yards. Scott's special teams performance in that game sufficiently impressed head coach Friedgen that he said, "I think I've got to try to get him involved within the offense. I think he's a guy that can make some plays for us." The following week, unranked Maryland upset 10th-ranked Rutgers, and Scott made his first career appearance as a tailback. He had three carries for 29 yards. After sitting out the Georgia Tech game because of an ankle injury, he returned four kicks for 68 yards against Virginia, three for 56 yards against Clemson, and two for 40 yards against North Carolina. Against eighth-ranked Boston College, Scott caught a short screen pass from quarterback Chris Turner and ran 57 yards for a touchdown. It was his first career reception and first career touchdown. It was one of just two offensive plays for Scott in that game, and incidentally, he was not intended to be in it. Friedgen said

When he was in the game, I didn't even know he was in the game. I called a screen pass. I looked up, and it was Da'Rel in there. I figured we were just giving Lance a rest, but I asked [running backs coach Phil] Zacharias about it Sunday and he started laughing. I said 'Did you put Da'Rel in for that screen pass?' He said, 'Lance's equipment was broken, so he had to go in the game.'

In the loss to Florida State, Scott rushed twice for 17 yards and returned four kickoffs for 132 yards. On one return, Scott gained 60 yards and nearly broke away for a touchdown, but Maryland was unable to capitalize on the gain during the subsequent possession. The next week, Maryland secured bowl eligibility by winning its regular season finale against NC State. Scott returned the opening kickoff 36 yards and recorded 89 yards on eight carries to lead the team in rushing. In the 2007 Emerald Bowl against Oregon State, Scott had one carry for no gain and returned two kickoffs for 36 yards. Scott finished the season as the team's all-purpose yardage leader with 84.2 yards per game and kick return leader with 566 yards, which set a school record for a freshman. Rivals.com named him a freshman All-ACC all-purpose player.

=== 2008 season ===
After the graduation of running backs Ball and Lattimore, Scott competed with Morgan Green for the starting position. At the conclusion of spring practice, it appeared they would share the duties, as they had complementary running styles: Scott had breakaway speed, while Green was a hard runner for short-yardage gains. However, Green suffered a quadriceps injury that caused him to fall to the third-string position behind true freshman Davin Meggett.

During the season, Scott played in 12 of 13 games, including 11 starts, and recorded 1,133 rushing yards and eight touchdowns. In the first game of the 2008 season against Delaware, Scott ran for 197 yards in his first career start, which was enough to place sixteenth on the list for school all-time single-game rushing. The following week, underdog Middle Tennessee stunned Maryland, 24–14, but Scott set the game-high for rushing with 123 yards. He tallied his career-first rushing touchdown with a 63-yard run on the second play of the game. Scott "dominated early" against 23rd-ranked California with 19 carries for 87 yards and two touchdowns, but in the third quarter, he suffered a game-ending shoulder injury. His first-half effort helped Maryland take a quick lead and eventually upset California, 35–27. Scott sat out the next game against Eastern Michigan, but returned for the road game at 20th-ranked Clemson. Scott made 23 carries but gained only 39 yards, a mark that was surpassed by receiver Heyward-Bey on one reverse that gained 76 yards to spark a second-half comeback. Head coach Friedgen said

I told Da'Rel he needed to run a little more north–south. Clemson has such good team speed. If you go east–west on them, you're not going to go very far. I thought he had a couple runs when he tried to bounce it outside. Normally, Da'Rel can do that. Not against this team . . . I told him this is a game where three yards is a good running play . . . I don't know if Da'Rel has been in a game like this, playing the whole game that way in a tough environment. He came out in the second half and said 'I'm going to go, coach.' He patted me on the butt. 'Just get me the ball.'

Scott tallied the go-ahead touchdown to complete Maryland's comeback, 20–17. The following week, Maryland fell to a heavy underdog again when a reeling Virginia team engineered a 31–0 shutout. Scott, then the leading rusher in the Atlantic Coast Conference (ACC), had 11 carries but was held to just 36 yards. Despite the setback, Scott retained the lead in the ACC with 96.4 rushing yards per game. After a bye week, Maryland shutout 21st-ranked Wake Forest, 26–0. Scott had 18 carries for a game-high of 73 yards, threw a nine-yard touchdown pass, and had three fumbles. In the first quarter, Scott fumbled at the Wake Forest 25-yard line, but was able to recover the ball. Two plays later, he executed a halfback option, where he took the handoff and threw a nine-yard pass to Heyward-Bey for a touchdown. It was Scott's first pass attempt and completion. Scott fumbled twice more in the first half, and Wake Forest recovered only to miss a field goal attempt each time. Against NC State, Scott had 23 carries for 163 yards and a 24-yard touchdown. In the fourth quarter, after the third play of Maryland's game-winning drive, Meggett replaced Scott, who had re-injured his shoulder. With the sixth win, Maryland attained bowl eligibility. Scott remained the ACC leading rusher with 102.6 yards per game. He was deemed questionable before the Virginia Tech game, but did see action. However, the Virginia Tech line held Scott to 11 yards on 10 carries, although he did manage five receptions for 57 yards. Against 17th-ranked North Carolina, Scott recorded 129 rushing yards and a three-yard touchdown run. Maryland entered its penultimate regular season game against Florida State still within reach of the Atlantic Division title, and with it, a berth in the ACC Championship Game. Florida State, however, dashed Maryland's title hopes in a 37–3 rout in which Scott recorded 82 rushing yards, but fumbled twice. In the fourth quarter, defensive end Everette Brown forced Scott to fumble, which was seen as the end to any potential comeback. Against a tough Boston College line, the Maryland rushing attack faltered, which forced quarterback Chris Turner to resort mostly to the pass. Scott rushed 13 times for a gain of just 19 yards.

In the postseason, Maryland accepted an invitation to the Humanitarian Bowl to play the Western Athletic Conference runner-up, Nevada. Before the game, however, head coach Ralph Friedgen caught Scott and six other players breaking curfew. Scott declined to comment to the media about why he had missed curfew, and Friedgen said only that Scott had tried to "help somebody and got put in a bad situation." Friedgen initially intended to send the offenders back to College Park by bus, but athletic director Deborah Yow convinced him to issue partial-game suspensions instead. Scott was benched until halfway through the third quarter. He said, "I made a bad decision. I felt I had to run with a purpose." Scott was put into the game on Maryland's third possession of the half but did not receive a carry until the following series. On his first attempt, he ran for 14 yards and then ran 11 yards on his second. During the next drive, he broke free on a 49-yard touchdown run. On the next possession, Scott rushed on all four plays and gained 66 yards and another touchdown. Maryland won, 42–35, and Scott was named the Terrapins' most valuable player of the game. Nevada head coach Chris Ault said, "He just ran through us like we weren't there. They ran the weak-side gap, we knew that was one of their base plays, and he did a great job. He's a heck of a back, no question about it. He was breaking tackles, and that's not only a difference-maker but a morale-changer." He ran for 174 yards, which broke the school record for rushing in a bowl game previously set by Lu Gambino in the 1948 Gator Bowl. Scott also became just the seventh Maryland player to surpass the 1,000-yard single-season rushing benchmark. Earlier in the season, Scott set that mark as one of his goals, and he adorned his room with the statistics of the Terrapins who accomplished that feat in the past, such as Chris Downs in 2002.

Scott spent much of the season as the leading rusher in the ACC, but he was eventually surpassed by Jonathan Dwyer of Georgia Tech and finished second in the conference. In early October, Scott was added to the Maxwell Award watch list. The Atlantic Coast Conference named Scott to the All-ACC first-team alongside Dwyer.

=== 2009 season ===
During a practice in April 2009, Scott and cornerback Nolan Carroll collided, which injured both players. Scott suffered a sprained knee which forced him to sit out the Red–White spring game. He entered summer practice at the top of the depth chart, but Davin Meggett's camp performance was impressive enough to earn a share of the number-one position. In its 2009 preseason issue, Phil Steele's listed Scott as the 23rd-ranked draft eligible college running back, a preseason first-team All-ACC running back, and one of 19 "darkhorse" contenders for the Heisman Trophy. Athlon Sports named him to their preseason All-ACC second-team. Before the season, he was added to the Doak Walker Award and Maxwell Award watch lists.

In the season opener at 12th-ranked California, Scott recorded 13 carries for 90 yards. He scored the Terrapins' only touchdown on a 39-yard rush in the third quarter of the 52–13 rout, Maryland's worst opening loss since 1892. The following week, Scott had 17 carries for 68 yards and a touchdown in an overtime win against James Madison. He recorded a 48-yard touchdown run against Middle Tennessee, but also two fumbles in the first quarter. Scott finished the game with 13 attempts for 117 yards., but coach Friedgen relied mostly on Meggett after the second turnover. Scott suffered a broken wrist against Clemson, a game that also saw Maryland left tackle Bruce Campbell injured. He sat out the next five games, before he returned in the penultimate game against Florida State, in which he ran 83 yards on 19 attempts and also had two receptions for 21 yards. The performance prompted Scout.com to note, "It's almost like this stud running back never missed a game for the Terps … it is impressive to see the junior hard at work and making up for lost time." In the season finale against Boston College, Maryland opened the game with Scott attempting a pass to wide receiver Torrey Smith on a halfback option play; it fell incomplete but drew a defensive pass interference call. Scott rushed for 45 yards and a touchdown on 11 attempts, and caught three passes for 20 yards.

=== 2010 season ===
In the winter, Scott competed on the indoor track team and ran a 60-yard dash in 6.87 seconds, and he claimed to have regained the speed he had in high school. During spring football camp, he recorded the fastest 40-yard dash time among the running backs at 4.33 seconds. Head coach Ralph Friedgen praised Scott for the strength and size he added in the offseason, and offensive coordinator James Franklin described Scott as a "complete back". Before the season, Scott was added to the Maxwell Award and Doak Walker Award watch lists.

Maryland entered the 2010 season with Scott and Meggett sharing time as the number-one running back. Head coach Friedgen said, "At this point in time, I would say Scott and Meggett are 1A and 1B." In the season opener against Navy, Scott recorded 58 yards on ten carries, which included five touches on the opening drive for 36 yards and a five-yard touchdown run. The following week against Division I FCS Morgan State, Scott, Meggett, and redshirt freshman running back D. J. Adams all averaged over five yards per carry in the 62–3 rout. Scott amassed eight carries for 42 yards and three receptions for 31 yards. Maryland's rushing attack struggled in the 31–17 loss to West Virginia, and Scott had four carries for six yards and three catches for 26 yards. Against Florida International, he gained 103 yards and scored two touchdowns on 15 carries. Scott scored on a 56-yard run and a nine-yard run in which he broke three arm tackles. Duke held Scott to 26 yards in the first half, but in the third quarter, he caught a short pass from quarterback Danny O'Brien and ran down the sideline for a 71-yard touchdown. O'Brien said he repeatedly checked down through his available receivers and Scott was his final option. Scott finished with 14 carries for 50 yards.

At Clemson, Scott threw a four-yard touchdown pass to quarterback Danny O'Brien on a trick play for Maryland's only score in a 31–7 loss. He had four rushing attempts for 18 yards. During that game, Scott became the tenth player in school history to amass 3,000 all-purpose yards. At Boston College, Scott rushed nine times for 19 yards and caught one pass for four yards. He also filled in for injured kickoff returner Torrey Smith and had one return for 25 yards. Against Wake Forest, he had eleven carries for 50 yards and one reception for ten yards. At Miami, Scott rushed nine times for 30 yards and had a 12-yard reception. At Virginia, he carried the ball 11 times for 55 yards and had two catches for eight yards including a two-yard reception for a touchdown. Against 25th-ranked Florida State, Scott rushed ten times for 87 yards and caught two passes for eight yards. Scott was held to negative ten rushing yards on four touches by 23rd-ranked North Carolina State in his final home game on Senior Night, but Maryland still won, 38–31.

In the Military Bowl against East Carolina, Scott rushed for a career-high 200 yards on 13 carries, including two touchdowns on 61- and 91-yard runs, and was named the game's Most Valuable Player. He broke the school record for rushing in a bowl game that he previously set in 2008. His performance was described as "utterly electrifying", and left his "stock among draft-eligible running backs soaring with NFL scouts". His 15.4 yards per carry was the best single-game performance in school history. Scott ended the 2010 season with 708 rushing yards on 122 attempts and five touchdowns. He finished his college career with 2,401 rushing yards on 430 attempts and 17 touchdowns, and 3,509 all-purpose yards. Scott ranked seventh in school history in career rushing yards and second in career yards per carry with an average of 5.58.

Scott was invited to play in the East–West Shrine Game on January 22, 2011, in Orlando. He also participated in the Senior Bowl, and The New York Times praised him for his practice leading up to the game. In the Senior Bowl, Scott recorded five carries for 15 yards, including a touchdown on a one-yard run.

=== College statistics ===
Maryland			Rushing					Receiving					Returning				Passing
Season	GP	GS	Att	Yds	Avg	Lg	TD	Rec	Yds	Avg	Lg	TD	KRs	Yds	Lg	TD	Att	Cmp	Yds	Avg	Lg	TD	Int
2007	9	0	14	135	9.6	33	0	1	57	57.0	57	1	26	566	60	0	0	0	0	0	0	0	0
2008	12	11	209	1,133	5.4	63	8	21	171	8.1	25	0	0	0	0	0	2	1	9	4.5	9	1	0
2009	7	5	85	425	5.0	48	4	12	111	9.3	19	0	0	0	0	0	0	0	0	0	0	0	0
2010	13	13	122	708	5.8	91	5	14	170	12.1	71	3	2	33	25	0	1	1	4	4.0	4	1	0
Total	41	29	430	2,401	5.6	91	17	48	509	10.6	71	4	28	599	60	0	3	2	13	4.3	9	2	0

== Professional career ==
Pre-draft measurables
Height	Weight	Arm length	Hand span	Wingspan	40-yard dash	10-yard split	20-yard split	20-yard shuttle	Three-cone drill	Vertical jump	Broad jump	Bench press
5 ft 11 in (1.80 m)	211 lb (96 kg)	32 1/2 in (0.83 m)	9 in (0.23 m)	6 ft 2 in (1.88 m)	4.38 s	1.55 s	2.59 s	4.20 s	7.15 s	34.0 in (0.86 m)	9 ft 9 in (2.97 m)	19 reps
All values from NFL Combine

=== New York Giants ===
The New York Giants selected Scott with the 221st overall pick in the 2011 NFL draft. Giants general manager Jerry Reese said, "We took a flyer on the guy because he is big and fast… We hope this guy develops into a Willie Parker, one of those kinds of things." At the NFL Combine, Scott ran the 40-yard dash in 4.34 seconds, the fastest time recorded by any of the participating running backs.

Scott secured a spot on the active roster behind Ahmad Bradshaw and Brandon Jacobs with a strong preseason performance. In the game against the Chicago Bears, he had one carry for a 97-yard touchdown. Against the New England Patriots, Scott took a snap on a fake punt, which he ran 65 yards for a touchdown. He made his regular season debut in Week 1 against the Washington Redskins, but recorded no statistics. Scott only recorded five carries for 15 yards in 11 games played.

On October 20, 2012, Scott was placed on season-ending injured reserve due to a knee injury.

On October 1, 2013, the Giants waived him after his first career start in the Week 4 loss against the Kansas City Chiefs. On October 8, 2013, the Giants re-signed Scott after running back David Wilson was out with a neck injury. On October 15, 2013, the Giants waived him again after he injured his hamstring in the Week 6 loss against the Chicago Bears.

=== Canadian Football League ===
Scott signed with the Winnipeg Blue Bombers in April 2015. He was released by the Blue Bombers on January 6, 2016. Scott was signed by the Hamilton Tiger-Cats on May 28, 2016.

== Personal life ==
Scott motivates himself for games by channeling the anger at his father's abandonment. He said, "I am always going to have anger because of how he did me. It is always going to be there. It is not going away. No way at all." While basketball player Michael Jordan was Scott's childhood sports idol, he says Jordan was not the inspiration for his jersey number of 23. Scott chose it as a combination of his older brothers' high school numbers: James wore number 20, and Lee Jr. wore number 3. Scott said, "They were my father."
