= 2006 Champs Sports Bowl =

American college football game

Purdue Boilermakers	Maryland Terrapins
(8–5)	(8–4)
Big Ten	ACC
7	24
Head coach: Joe Tiller	Head coach: Ralph Friedgen
	1	2	3	4	Total
Purdue	0	7	0	0	7
Maryland	7	14	3	0	24
- Date: December 29, 2006
- Season: 2006
- Stadium: Florida Citrus Bowl
- Location: Orlando, Florida
- MVP: QB Sam Hollenbach (Maryland)
- Referee: Rocky Goode (SEC)
- Attendance: 40,168

United States TV coverage
- Network: ESPN
- Announcers: Brad Nessler (play-by-play); Paul Maguire, Bob Griese (analysts); and Bonnie Bernstein (sideline)

The 2006 Champs Sports Bowl was played on December 29, 2006. This 17th edition to the college football bowl game featured the Maryland Terrapins and the Purdue Boilermakers.

== Game summary ==
- Maryland - Joey Haynos 4 yard pass from Sam Hollenbach (Dan Ennis kick)
- Maryland - Cory Jackson 1 yard run (Dan Ennis kick)
- Maryland - Darrius Heyward-Bey 46 yard pass from Sam Hollenbach (Dan Ennis kick)
- Purdue - Greg Orton 12 yard pass from Curtis Painter (Chris Summers kick)
- Maryland - Dan Ennis 22 yard field goal

Maryland started the scoring with a 4-yard touchdown pass from quarterback Sam Hollenbach to Joey Haynos, giving Maryland a 7-0 first quarter lead. In the second quarter, running back Cory Jackson scored on a 1-yard touchdown lead, to stretch the lead out to 14–0. With 2:05 left in the first half, Hollenbach connected on a 46-yard touchdown pass to wide receiver Darrius Heyward-Bey, increasing Maryland's lead to 21–0.

With only 30 seconds left in the first half, quarterback Curtis Painter threw a touchdown pass to make the half-time score 21–7, Maryland. In the third quarter, Dan Ennis added a 22-yard field goal, which would cap the scoring, and make the final margin 24–7, Maryland.

== Aftermath ==
Maryland had announced in 2012 that they would join Purdue in the Big Ten, in 2014.
