= Maryland–Penn State football rivalry =

American college football rivalry

- Maryland Terrapins Penn State Nittany Lions
- First meeting: November 17, 1917; Penn State, 57–0
- Latest meeting: November 30, 2024; Penn State, 44–7
- Next meeting: November 28, 2026

Statistics
- Total meetings: 48
- All-time series: Penn State leads, 44–3–1
- Largest victory: Penn State, 70–7 (1993); Penn State, 66–3 (2017)
- Longest win streak: Penn State, 24 (1962–1988)
- Current win streak: Penn State, 4 (2021–present)

Locations of Maryland and Penn State

The Maryland–Penn State football rivalry is an American college football rivalry between the Maryland Terrapins and Penn State Nittany Lions. In a series dating back to 1917, Penn State has an overwhelming series advantage, having won 44 out of 48 games. When Maryland joined Penn State in the Big Ten Conference in 2014, this series became a yearly conference series with implications for the Big Ten East Division title. On October 4, 2023, the Big Ten announced future football opponents for the 2024 to 2028 seasons with the addition of four schools to the conference and the removal of divisions. The teams are scheduled to meet in 2024, 2026, and 2027.

== Series history ==
=== Early years ===
Between 1917 and 1944, Maryland and Penn State played a total of six games, all Penn State victories, including shutouts in 1917 (57–0), 1938 (33–0), 1939 (12–0), and 1943 (45–0).

From 1944 to 1959, the teams did not play any games against each other.

=== Middle years ===
The series resumed in 1960, with Maryland and Penn State playing 31 games between 1960 and 1993. During this middle period of competition, Penn State again dominated the series, compiling a 29–1–1 record, including 24 consecutive wins from 1962 to 1985 and six consecutive blowouts in 1967 (38–3), 1968 (57–13), 1969 (48–0), 1970 (34–0), 1971 (63–27), and 1972 (46–16). Several later games were narrowly lost by missed field goals and turnovers. In 1975, a field goal attempt by kicker Mike Sochko hit the upright with under a minute left; Maryland lost 15–13. On September 7, 1985, no. 7 Maryland missed two field goals in the fourth quarter, and no. 19 Penn State won, 20–18, in a game considered an upset.

The 1993 game, during Penn State's first season in the Big Ten Conference, was the last game in the series for over 20 years. Prior to Maryland's announcement to join the Big Ten, former Maryland head coach Ralph Friedgen and Penn State athletic spokesman Jeff Nelson had previously stated that the schools had undergone discussions in an attempt to schedule a rematch. Maryland and Penn State were unable to agree on the terms for a revival. In 2008, Maryland officials alleged that Penn State demanded a two-to-one ratio of home games, which Penn State officials denied. Maryland head coach Randy Edsall, in 2011, expressed his hope that the series might resume.

=== Big Ten years ===
On November 19, 2012, Maryland announced that it would be joining the Big Ten Conference, effective July 1, 2014. Maryland was placed in the East Division along with Penn State, ensuring that Maryland and Penn State would play on a yearly basis. Prior to Maryland joining the conference, Penn State coach James Franklin, speaking in Baltimore, Maryland, claimed the new Big Ten territory as "in-state" adding, "I know there other schools around here, but you might as well shut them down". Maryland coach Randy Edsall responded to Franklin: "Talk is cheap."

The first rematch was at Beaver Stadium on November 1, 2014. Prior to the game, Edsall said that he looked forward to creating a rivalry with Penn State, while Franklin said that he saw Maryland simply as a Big Ten opponent, not a rival. During the warmups, Maryland and Penn State players scuffled. During the scuffle Maryland star wide receiver Stefon Diggs made contact with a referee and was handed a one-game suspension after the game for violating the conference's sportsmanship policy. At the coin toss the captains of the Terps refused to shake hands with the Penn State captains. Maryland won 20–19 on a 43-yard field goal by Brad Craddock with 51 seconds left in the fourth quarter. Maryland wide receiver Stefon Diggs, coach Randy Edsall, and athletic director Kevin Anderson made public apologies to the Penn State President, coaching staff and players after being reprimanded by the Big Ten Conference.

After the 2014 game, Penn State won nine of the next ten games, including blowout victories in 2016 (38–14), 2017 (66–3), 2018 (38–3), 2019 (59–0), 2022 (30–0), 2023 (51–15), and 2024 (44–7). Maryland defeated Penn State during COVID-shortened 2020 season, 35–19; Penn State began the 2020 season with a 0–5 record, the worst start in Penn State history.

During the Big Ten years, local media debated whether the series could be considered a rivalry. Prior to the 2015 season, the Hanover Evening Sun in Hanover, Pennsylvania, published two columns debating the status of the rivalry. Zach Miller wrote that Maryland–Penn State football games "are still a long way from rivalry status." In contrast, Brandon Stoneburg said that the 2014 Maryland win was the start of "a new era of Penn State vs. Maryland football, an era that is indeed a rivalry." Steve Heiser wrote in 2016 for the York Dispatch that Maryland is the closest true rival to Penn State due to the campuses' home states bordering each other, the schools competing for recruits, and the close scores of two then-recent games.

=== Competition in recruiting ===
Maryland and Penn State compete for recruits in the Baltimore–Washington metropolitan area and Philadelphia metropolitan area. Penn State secured a large number of recruits from the Baltimore–Washington area with its 2006 class, including the 11th-overall 2009 NFL draft pick, defensive end Aaron Maybin of Ellicott City, Maryland, who had considered attending Maryland.

== Game results ==
Maryland victories	Penn State victories	Tie games

No.	Date	Location	Winner	Score
1	November 17, 1917	University Park, PA	Penn State	57–0
2	November 13, 1937	University Park, PA	Penn State	21–14
3	October 1, 1938	University Park, PA	Penn State	33–0
4	November 4, 1939	University Park, PA	Penn State	12–0
5	October 23, 1943	College Park, MD	Penn State	45–0
6	November 18, 1944	University Park, PA	Penn State	34–19
7	November 5, 1960	University Park, PA	Penn State	28–9
8	November 4, 1961	College Park, MD	Maryland	21–17
9	November 3, 1962	University Park, PA	Penn State	23–7
10	November 2, 1963	College Park, MD	Penn State	17–15
11	October 31, 1964	University Park, PA	Penn State	17–9
12	December 4, 1965	College Park, MD	Penn State	19–7
13	September 17, 1966	University Park, PA	Penn State	15–7
14	November 4, 1967	College Park, MD	Penn State	38–3
15	November 16, 1968	College Park, MD	No. 3 Penn State	57–13
16	November 15, 1969	University Park, PA	No. 5 Penn State	48–0
17	November 7, 1970	College Park, MD	Penn State	34–0
18	November 6, 1971	University Park, PA	No. 6 Penn State	63–27
19	November 4, 1972	University Park, PA	No. 10 Penn State	46–16
20	November 3, 1973	College Park, MD	No. 6 Penn State	42–22
21	November 2, 1974	University Park, PA	No. 10 Penn State	24–17
22	November 1, 1975	College Park, MD	No. 9 Penn State	15–13
23	September 24, 1977	University Park, PA	No. 5 Penn State	27–9
24	November 4, 1978	University Park, PA	No. 2 Penn State	27–3
25	October 6, 1979	College Park, MD	Penn State	27–7

No.	Date	Location	Winner	Score
26	October 11, 1980	College Park, MD	No. 14 Penn State	24–10
27	September 11, 1982	University Park, PA	No. 7 Penn State	39–31
28	October 6, 1984	University Park, PA	No. 11 Penn State	25–24
29	September 7, 1985	College Park, MD	No. 19 Penn State	20–18
30	November 8, 1986	University Park, PA	No. 2 Penn State	17–15
31	November 7, 1987	Baltimore, MD	No. 16 Penn State	21–16
32	November 5, 1988	University Park, PA	Penn State	17–10
33	November 11, 1989	Baltimore, MD	Tie	13–13
34	November 10, 1990	University Park, PA	No. 21 Penn State	24–10
35	November 9, 1991	Baltimore, MD	No. 9 Penn State	47–7
36	September 26, 1992	University Park, PA	No. 9 Penn State	49–13
37	October 2, 1993	College Park, MD	No. 9 Penn State	70–7
38	November 1, 2014	University Park, PA	Maryland	20–19
39	October 24, 2015	Baltimore, MD	Penn State	31–30
40	October 8, 2016	University Park, PA	Penn State	38–14
41	November 25, 2017	College Park, MD	No. 10 Penn State	66–3
42	November 24, 2018	University Park, PA	No. 12 Penn State	38–3
43	September 27, 2019	College Park, MD	No. 12 Penn State	59–0
44	November 7, 2020	University Park, PA	Maryland	35–19
45	November 6, 2021	College Park, MD	No. 22 Penn State	31–14
46	November 12, 2022	University Park, PA	No. 14 Penn State	30–0
47	November 4, 2023	College Park, MD	No. 11 Penn State	51–15
48	November 30, 2024	University Park, PA	No. 4 Penn State	44–7
Series: Penn State leads 44–3–1

== See also ==
- List of NCAA college football rivalry games
- Ravens–Steelers rivalry
