= Cory Jackson =

American football player (born 1988)

No. 38
- Position: Fullback

Personal information
- Born: March 12, 1988 (age 38); Morgantown, West Virginia, U.S.
- Listed height: 6 ft 1 in (1.85 m)
- Listed weight: 245 lb (111 kg)

Career information
- College: Maryland
- NFL draft: 2010: undrafted

Career history
- San Diego Chargers (2010)*; Virginia Destroyers (2011)
- * Offseason or practice squad member only

Cory Jackson (born March 12, 1988) is an American former professional football player who was a fullback in the National Football League (NFL). He played college football for the Maryland Terrapins and was signed by the San Diego Chargers as an undrafted free agent in 2010.

== Early life ==
Jackson was born in Morgantown, West Virginia to parents Terrence and Melissa Jackson. His father played football and baseball at Yale, and his brother, Todd, played football at West Virginia. Cory Jackson attended University High School, and was a four-year starter on the football team as a linebacker, tailback, and defensive end. As a junior in 2004, he recorded almost 1,000 rushing yards and more than 100 tackles. During his senior year in 2005, Jackson recorded 1,307 rushing yards and 17 touchdowns, 161 tackles, two quarterback sacks, one interception, and two fumble recoveries.

As a sophomore, he was named a second-team all-state defensive lineman. As a junior and senior, he was named a first-team all-state player. He was also named the conference player of the year as a senior. ESPN assessed Jackson as the 12th-ranked inside linebacker in the nation. PrepStar named him an All-American. Rivals.com ranked him as the second-best player in West Virginia. He was recruited by Maryland, Stanford, NC State, Iowa, and West Virginia.

== College career ==
Jackson attended the University of Maryland where he earned a degree in communications and was a four-year letterman in football. In 2006, true freshman Jackson saw action in all 13 games including three starts. When starting fullback Tim Cesa was injured, Jackson replaced him for the season's final four games. He also played a role on special teams. He rushed four times for 12 yards and a touchdown and caught four passes for 46 yards.

In 2007, Jackson played in 12 games including eight starts. He recorded five tackles on special teams. He was also integral in allowing tailbacks Lance Ball and Keon Lattimore to rush for a combined total of almost 1,600 yards and 25 touchdowns. After suffering a broken hand, Jackson missed one game.

In 2008, he played in all 13 games including six starts. He recorded five solo tackles, one forced fumble, three carries for four yards, 12 receptions for 106 yards, and one kick return for nine yards. He again was critical in the offensive backfield, opening up holes for running backs such as Da'Rel Scott who rushed for 1,133 yards. Maryland head coach Ralph Friedgen said, "[Cory Jackson] might be our MVP and an unsung hero ... He does all the dirty work. When he's playing well, we're playing well. It definitely had an impact on our running game." Defensive end Jeremy Navarre compared Jackson's playing style to that of a defensive player and said, "I don't think fullback Cory would want to go against Cory the linebacker ... He's a tough guy. He always comes out with a bloody nose or something."

In 2009, Jackson saw action in all twelve games as a fullback, including eight starts, and on special teams. Although serving mostly as a blocker, he also compiled three carries for 14 yards and six pass receptions for 46 yards. Pro Football Weekly named Jackson an honorable mention All-American. The CBS Sports-affiliated NFL Draft Scout rated Jackson as the number-two fullback prospect for the 2010 NFL draft.

== Professional career ==
Pre-draft measurables
| Height | Weight | 40-yard dash | 10-yard split | 20-yard split | 20-yard shuttle | Three-cone drill | Vertical jump | Broad jump | Bench press |
|---|---|---|---|---|---|---|---|---|---|
| 6 ft 0 3/4 in (1.85 m) | 245 lb (111 kg) | 4.83 s | 1.65 s | 2.77 s | 4.76 s | 7.23 s | 34.5 in (0.88 m) | 9 ft 4 in (2.84 m) | 23 reps |
All values from Pro Day

=== San Diego Chargers ===
Jackson was signed by the San Diego Chargers as an undrafted free agent following the 2010 NFL draft on April 27, 2010. He was waived on June 21.
