= Morgan Green =

American football player (born 1987)

No. 5
- Position: Running back

Personal information
- Born: March 7, 1987 (age 39); White Plains, Maryland, U.S.
- Listed height: 5 ft 11 in (1.80 m)
- Listed weight: 215 lb (98 kg)

Career information
- High school: Henry E. Lackey High School
- College: Maryland (2006–2009)
- Stats at ESPN

Morgan Green (born March 7, 1987) is an American former college and high school football player. He played as a running back for the Maryland Terrapins at the University of Maryland. He played interscholastic football for Henry E. Lackey High School in Indian Head, Maryland, where he became one of the state's all-time rushing leaders.

== Early life ==
Morgan Green was born in White Plains, Maryland to parents James and Denise Green. He attended Henry E. Lackey High School in Indian Head, Maryland where he was a three-year starter in football. As a sophomore in 2002, he amassed 1,131 rushing yards and 18 touchdowns, the most of any Washington, D.C. area player in his grade. He expressed disappointment with his performance, however, and worked out intensively in the weight room during the offseason.

The following year, he recorded 2,630 yards and 26 touchdowns on 360 carries. Green rushed for 200 yards in eight games and set a school rushing record against Leonardtown High School. He was named a consensus first-team all-state and The Washington Post All-Met player. He was also named to the George Michael's Golden 11 team and named the conference most valuable player.

As a senior in 2004, he recorded 209 carries for 1,363 yards and 23 touchdowns, despite missing six games due to an injury. That year, he received Big School second-team all-state and first-team All-SMAC honors. Green expressed his desire to gain yards and challenge the state single-season rushing record. The Lackey High's ball-hawking defense, however, often put the offense in scoring position on a shortened field. About that Green said, "It is less running for me. And even though I might not like that, it's a big relief. If the defense could make plays, it's less stressful on me." At the end of his high school playing career, Green ranked as the fifth leading rusher in Maryland state history.

ESPN rated Green the eighth-ranked college fullback prospect in the nation. PrepStar and SuperPrep each named Green an All-American. SuperPrep rated him as the 14th-ranked college running back prospect in the nation. Rivals.com named him the six-ranked overall player in the state and 12-ranked tailback in the nation. He was recruited by Boston College, Florida, Maryland, N.C. State, Penn State, and Virginia. He received scholarship offers from Penn State, Maryland, and Virginia. He committed to Maryland, and head coach Ralph Friedgen rescinded a scholarship offer to future Heisman Trophy finalist Steve Slaton, partly in favor of Green. In 2005, Green failed to academically qualify for Maryland, and attended preparatory school at the Hargrave Military Academy in Chatham, Virginia. While there, he rushed 21 times for 151 yards and one touchdown.

== College career ==
At Maryland, he sat out the 2006 season as a redshirt. Before the 2007 season, he excelled in practice and was expected to make an impact as the two starting running backs had suffered injuries. He played in the season opener against Villanova, but suffered a hamstring injury and sat out the remainder of the season. In 2008, Green suffered a lingering quadriceps injury in camp. It continued to bother him throughout the season, and he fell to the third-ranked rusher, behind starter Da'Rel Scott and reserve Davin Meggett. Green did see action in ten games and recorded 24 carries for 114 yards and three touchdowns. Against Eastern Michigan, Green rushed for two touchdowns. In the 2008 Humanitarian Bowl against Nevada, he rushed 10 times for 72 yards with a 53-yard long and one touchdown.

During spring camp in 2009, Green commented on his previous preseason injuries by saying, "If I make it through camp, I'll be the happiest guy ever because then I'll know I'll have a good season. It seems like it's the camp jinx for me." Starting quarterback Chris Turner said of Green, "I think Morgan can be a huge key in this offense ... I think Da'Rel [Scott] gets a lot of the exposure because he's obviously explosive, but Morgan is actually a big, explosive, and fast back."

In the spring of 2010, he approached head coach Ralph Friedgen and discussed his future with the team. Green decided that he would finish his degree at Maryland and then transfer to Towson University for the remainder of his athletic eligibility. Green, however, did not join the Towson football team for the 2010 season.
