= Chris Cosh =

American football player and coach (born 1959)

Biographical details
- Born: May 12, 1959 (age 67)

Playing career
- 1977–1981: Virginia Tech
- Position: Linebacker

Coaching career (HC unless noted)
- 1983: Virginia Tech (SA)
- 1984: Minnesota (GA)
- 1985–1988: Wisconsin–Oshkosh (DC)
- 1989: SE Missouri St. (DC)
- 1990: UNLV (LB)
- 1991: Minnesota (DL)
- 1992–1994: Illinois (LB)
- 1995: Illinois (AHC/LB)
- 1996: Illinois (DC/BB)
- 1997: Maryland (LB/RC)
- 1998: Michigan State (DC)
- 1999–2002: South Carolina (LB)
- 2003: South Carolina (DC/LB)
- 2004–2005: Kansas State (LB)
- 2006–2008: Maryland (DC/LB)
- 2009: Kansas State (AHC/co-DC)
- 2010–2011: Kansas State (AHC/DC)
- 2012: South Florida (DC/LB)
- 2013–2014: Buffalo (DL)
- 2015: North Texas (DC)
- 2016: Richmond (DC)
- 2017–2019: Delaware (DC/DB)
- 2021: Christopher Newport (DC)
- 2022: Hampton (Co-DC)
- 2023: Western Michigan (Analyst)

Christopher Cosh (born May 12, 1959) is an American football coach and former player. Most recently, he served as an analyst at Western Michigan University.

== Playing career ==
Cosh played linebacker for the Virginia Tech Hokies from 1977 to 1981.

== Coaching career ==
He has been a defensive coach since he started as a student assistant at Virginia Tech in 1983. Cosh has moved around a lot, with 13 stops in 25 years, including two with the Maryland Terrapins (1997, 2006–2008) and re-joining Holtz with the South Carolina Gamecocks (1999–2003).

He served as linebackers coach in 2004 and 2005 for the Kansas State Wildcats under head coach Bill Snyder, before returning to Maryland as their defensive coordinator and linebackers coach with head coach Ralph Friedgen.

While at Maryland, Cosh was frequently criticized by fans for the inconsistent performance by Maryland's defense, which was described as "poor to occasionally impressive". Friedgen praised Cosh's recruiting but showed public frustration with Cosh's in-game coaching.

On December 6, 2008, it was announced that Cosh would return to Kansas State for a second time under coach Snyder (when Snyder decided to come out of retirement to help the Wildcats) as assistant head coach (to Snyder) and co-defensive coordinator alongside Vic Koenning.

Cosh will have now served as a defensive coordinator in five of the six BCS conferences (Big Ten, SEC, ACC, Big 12, and Big East).

On January 18, 2012, Cosh was announced as the new defensive coordinator at the University of South Florida.

On February 4, 2016, Cosh was named defensive coordinator at the University of Richmond. He followed head coach Danny Rocco to the University of Delaware as the defensive coordinator and defensive backs coach on January 5, 2017.

On July 21, 2021, Cosh was named defensive coordinator at Christopher Newport University. 2022 Hampton University defensive coordinator.

== Personal life ==
Cosh is a native of Washington, D.C., and graduated from Bishop McNamara High School in Forestville, Maryland. He has a bachelor's degree in physical education from Virginia Tech in 1983.

Cosh and his wife, Mary, live in Maryland. They have two sons, J. J., who was a member of the Midshipmen football team at the United States Naval Academy from 2007 to 2011. He is currently a scout for the Chicago Bears. Their other son, Billy, played at Kansas State University as a freshman before transferring to Butler Community College and later to the University of Houston, where he graduated in 2014. Billy is currently the head coach at Stony Brook University.
