= Lu Gambino =

American football player (1923–2003)

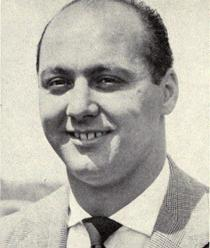
- Lu Gambino as a senior at the University of Maryland

No. 89, 77
- Positions: Fullback, halfback

Personal information
- Born: September 21, 1923; Berwyn, Illinois, U.S.
- Died: July 16, 2003 (aged 79); Maywood, Illinois, U.S.
- Listed height: 6 ft 1 in (1.85 m)
- Listed weight: 205 lb (93 kg)

Career information
- High school: J.S. Morton High School
- College: Indiana (1942); Maryland (1946-1947)
- NFL draft: 1945: 26th round, 271st overall pick

Career history
- Baltimore Colts (1948-1949)

Awards and highlights
- 1948 Gator Bowl MVP; 1947 All-SoCon

Career AAFC statistics
- Rushing yards: 402
- Rushing average: 3.7
- Receptions: 16
- Receiving yards: 95
- Total touchdowns: 2
- Stats at Pro Football Reference

Lucien Anthony "Lu" Gambino (September 21, 1923 – July 16, 2003) was an American football running back. He played college football for Indiana University, and after military service in the Second World War, the University of Maryland. While playing for Maryland, he set the National Collegiate Athletic Association (NCAA) season scoring high for 1947 with 16 touchdowns and 96 points and was named the 1948 Gator Bowl most valuable player. Gambino played professional football for two years with the Baltimore Colts in the All-America Football Conference (AAFC), an early competitor of the National Football League (NFL).

== Biography ==
=== Early life ===
Gambino was born in Berwyn, Illinois, on September 21, 1923. He attended J.S. Morton High School in Cicero, Illinois, where he was a football and track & field standout. Gambino enrolled at Indiana University in 1941, and he played football for the Hoosiers on the freshman team in 1941 and on the varsity team in 1942 season. That season, head coach Bo McMillin led Indiana to a 7–3 record, and the Hoosiers recorded six defensive shutouts and outscored their opponents 256–79. At Indiana, Gambino played alongside consensus All-America back, and future Colts teammate, Billy Hillenbrand. Shortly thereafter, Gambino dropped out of school to join the United States Army Air Forces and serve during the Second World War.

=== College career ===
Gambino was selected in the 1945 NFL draft by the Chicago Bears in the 26th round as the 271st overall pick. In 1946, he was discharged from the Army and enrolled at the University of Maryland. He considered Indiana to be a far superior football program and called Maryland a "cow school," but it was located relatively close to his mother, who was widowed and living alone in Baltimore. During the 1946 season, Gambino saw limited playing time for a mediocre Terrapins football team directed by head coach Clark Shaughnessy. The following year, head coach Jim Tatum was hired, and he engineered a reversal of the team's fortunes. Tatum took the mentorship of Gambino as a personal project and aimed to develop him into the team's featured back.

As a senior in 1947, Gambino set the NCAA season scoring high with 16 touchdowns for 96 points. In the fifth meeting against rival West Virginia, Gambino scored three touchdowns to help Maryland take away its first victory of the series, 27–0. He also scored three touchdowns against Delaware and Duquesne, and two against Vanderbilt where he also passed for a third. During the season, Gambino rushed for a total of 904 yards on 125 attempts, and as of 2009, he was Maryland's third-leading rusher in terms of single-season yards per carry (7.23). He was also Maryland's season kickoff return leader, and returned seven kicks for 174 yards, an average of 24.85 yards.

Maryland finished the regular season 7–2–1 and secured the school's first-ever bowl game appearance. In the 1948 Gator Bowl against Georgia, he was honored as the Most Valuable Player. During the 20–20 tie, Gambino rushed to score all three of the Terrapins' touchdowns on one-, 24-, and 35-yard runs. He compiled 165 rushing yards, a school bowl rushing record that stood for 60 years until finally broken by Da'Rel Scott in the 2008 Humanitarian Bowl. In 1992, for his achievement as the bowl game's "first superb running back", Gambino was inducted into the Gator Bowl Hall of Fame.

At season's end, he was named a first-team All-Southern Conference player, an All-America Catholic player, and an Associated Press honorable mention All-American. The Touchdown Club awarded Gambino the Arch McDonald Trophy as the best player in the Washington, D.C. area.

Prior to the start of the 1948 season, the Southern Conference ruled that his college eligibility was exhausted and that he would be unable to play another year of college football. Gambino had briefly attended the University of Indiana during the war and saw some minimal game action as "not much more than a walk-on, but was charged a full year of eligibility for his efforts. Gambino called the decision "crooked" and asserted that the standing rules did not count returning veterans' pre-war playing career against their eligibility.

Geary Eppley, a Maryland athletics official and member of the Southern Conference executive committee, filed a request for a special session to consider a rule change, but it failed to garner support from the two-thirds of the member schools required to call such a meeting. Gambino's college career was thus brought to an immediate end.

=== Professional career ===
Gambino with the Baltimore Colts in 1948

As the issue of his college eligibility was playing out, Gambino was being courted by several professional football teams. The Chicago Bears of the NFL, which had drafted him during the war, still had a strong interest in him, as did the Baltimore Colts of the All-America Football Conference (AAFC), who saw the Maryland star as a potential gate attraction. Baltimore eventually acquired Gambino, and to do so, they traded their first-round 1948 draft selection to the Cleveland Browns, who had selected Gambino in the 22nd round of the 1948 AAFC Draft.

Gambino played two seasons for the Colts, 1948 and 1949. During his first year, he saw action in nine games including one as a starter. On 54 carries, he rushed for a total of 194 yards and a touchdown. Gambino also recorded six receptions for 28 yards and made three kickoff returns for 57 yards. The following season, he played in ten games and started in six. He made 56 carries for 208 yards and ten receptions for 67 yards and a touchdown. At the time, Gambino was one of four Colts players who were bald. The Baltimore Sun published an article that explored the unusual occurrence and concluded that it had "nothing to do with wearing a helmet." In When the Colts Belonged to Baltimore, author William Gildea described Gambino: "In street clothes he looked like Robert Mitchum—wide-brimmed hat, long overcoat, baggy but creased trousers, a cigarette between his fingers, a craggy smile. Yesteryear's running back."

Baltimore released Gambino late in July 1950. He was regarded as having been to some extent a victim of the merger between the All-America Football Conference and the NFL, which resulted in the termination of four clubs and the associated influx of 128 free agent players into the professional football market.

In the winter, Gambino had knee surgery to correct a bone spur. He was then picked up by the New York Giants and placed on the reserve list in July 1951. His professional playing career, however, was ultimately cut short by his knee.

=== Life after football ===
Gambino married Vivian née Senese and lived in North Riverside, Illinois. He became a successful salesman and then a regional sales manager for a national whiskey company.

=== Death and legacy ===
He died of heart disease on July 16, 2003, at Loyola University Medical Center in Maywood, Illinois. Gambino was 79 years old.

== See also ==
- List of NCAA major college football yearly scoring leaders
