= 1948 Gator Bowl =

American college football game

Maryland Terrapins	Georgia Bulldogs
(7–2–1)	(7–4)
SoCon	SEC
20	20
Head coach: Jim Tatum	Head coach: Wally Butts
	1	2	3	4	Total
Maryland	0	7	13	0	20
Georgia	0	0	7	13	20
- Date: January 1, 1948
- Season: 1947
- Stadium: Gator Bowl
- Location: Jacksonville, Florida
- MVP: Lu Gambino
- Referee: K.C. Gerard (Southern; split crew: Southern, SEC)
- Attendance: 16,666

The 1948 Gator Bowl was the third edition of the Gator Bowl and featured the Maryland Terrapins representing the University of Maryland and the Georgia Bulldogs representing the University of Georgia. It was the first-ever meeting of the two teams.

In the second quarter, Maryland scored first with a 35-yard touchdown run by running back Lu Gambino. On the first possession of the second half, Georgia quarterback John Rauch engineered an 87-yard drive culminating in a one-yard quarterback keeper for a touchdown. Maryland responded with an 80-yard drive of their own and another Gambino touchdown. Georgia fumbled on their own 40-yard line and Maryland recovered. The Terrapins capitalized with a 24-yard John Barone pass to Gambino for a third touchdown. In the fourth quarter, Georgia running back Joe Geri ran it from the one-yard line for a score. Rauch threw a nine-yard touchdown pass to John Donaldson, but Georgia missed the extra point. The final result was a 20–20 stalemate.

Lu Gambino was named the 1948 Gator Bowl Most Valuable Player. He rushed for 165 yards and recorded all three of Maryland's touchdowns. His rushing yardage would stand as a school bowl game record for 60 years, until broken in 2008. John Rauch's 58-yard pass to Billy Henderson remained a Gator Bowl record for over 60 years.
