= John Donaldson (American football) =

American football player (1925–2018)

Profile
- Position: Defensive back / Tailback

Personal information
- Born: August 22, 1925; Jesup, Georgia
- Died: March 20, 2018 (aged 92)
- Listed height: 5 ft 10 in (1.78 m)
- Listed weight: 185 lb (84 kg)

Career information
- High school: Jesup (Jesup, Georgia)
- College: Georgia
- NFL draft: 1949: undrafted

Career history
- Chicago Hornets (1949); Los Angeles Dons (1949)
- Stats at Pro Football Reference

John Colvin Donaldson (August 22, 1925 – March 20, 2018) was an American football defensive back who played for the Chicago Hornets and Los Angeles Dons. He played college football at the University of Georgia, having previously attended Jesup High School. He is also a former member of the Georgia Bulldogs coaching staff.
