= Kevin Anderson (athletic director) =

American college athletics administrator (born 1955)

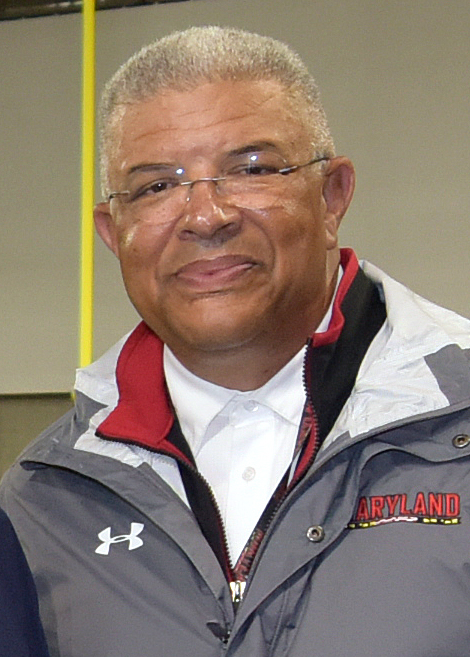
- Anderson in 2017

Biographical details
- Born: August 5, 1955 (age 71); San Francisco, California, U.S.
- Education: San Francisco State University

Administrative career (AD unless noted)
- 1997–2002: California (assistant AD)
- 2002–2004: Oregon State (assistant AD)
- 2004–2010: Army
- 2010–2018: Maryland
- 2018: Cal State Northridge (Interim AD)
- 2021-2022: Air Force (Senior Associate AD)

Kevin Bruce Anderson (born August 5, 1955) is a former American college athletics administrator for California State University, Northridge and former athletic director for the Maryland Terrapins, the NCAA Division I sports program of the University of Maryland, College Park. On October 16, 2017, the University of Maryland placed Kevin Anderson on a six-month leave of absence, and he officially resigned on April 13, 2018.

== Early life and education ==
Anderson grew up in San Francisco and attended Abraham Lincoln High School, where he was a multi-sport athlete. He is a 1979 graduate of San Francisco State University with a bachelor's degree in political science. After a stint as a high school football coach, Anderson attended the Sports Management Institute's executive management program and the new manager school at Xerox.

Following Xerox, Anderson began a fundraising role at the United Negro College Fund at the recommendation of the vice president at the University of California, Berkeley. Ultimately, Anderson entered college athletics at UC Berkeley at age 32.

== Athletic director career ==
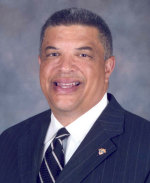
Anderson as the Army West Point athletic director

=== Army ===
Anderson's first athletic director position was at the United States Military Academy, where he directed the Army Black Knights from 2004 to 2010. At Army, Anderson was responsible for a 25-sport program, and an annual budget of $25 million, that served more than 900 cadet-athletes.

- On December 26, 2008, Anderson hired Rich Ellerson, from California Polytechnic State University, as the new Army head football coach.
- On September 24, 2009, Anderson fired Jim Crews, head basketball coach, from Army.

=== Maryland ===
Anderson's Maryland athletic director contract was initially for five years (2010–2015) at $401,015 annually, with up to $50,000 collectively in incentives for athletes' graduation rates and academic achievements, athletic fund-raising, and team success. Among significant events during his tenure:

- On December 21, 2010, Anderson fired Maryland head football coach Ralph Friedgen, who was that season's ACC Coach of the Year.
- On January 2, 2011, Anderson hired Randy Edsall away from Connecticut as the new Maryland head football coach.
- On May 9, 2011, Anderson hired Mark Turgeon from Texas A&M as the new head basketball coach to replace the retiring Gary Williams.
- November 2011, Anderson recommended cutting eight athletic teams - Men's Track and Field & Cross Country, Men's and Women's Swimming and Diving, Men's Tennis, Women's Water Polo and Women's Competitive Cheer.
- On July 1, 2014, the Terrapins left the Atlantic Coast Conference following 62 years as a founding member to join the Big Ten Conference.
