= Darrius Heyward-Bey =

American football player (born 1987)

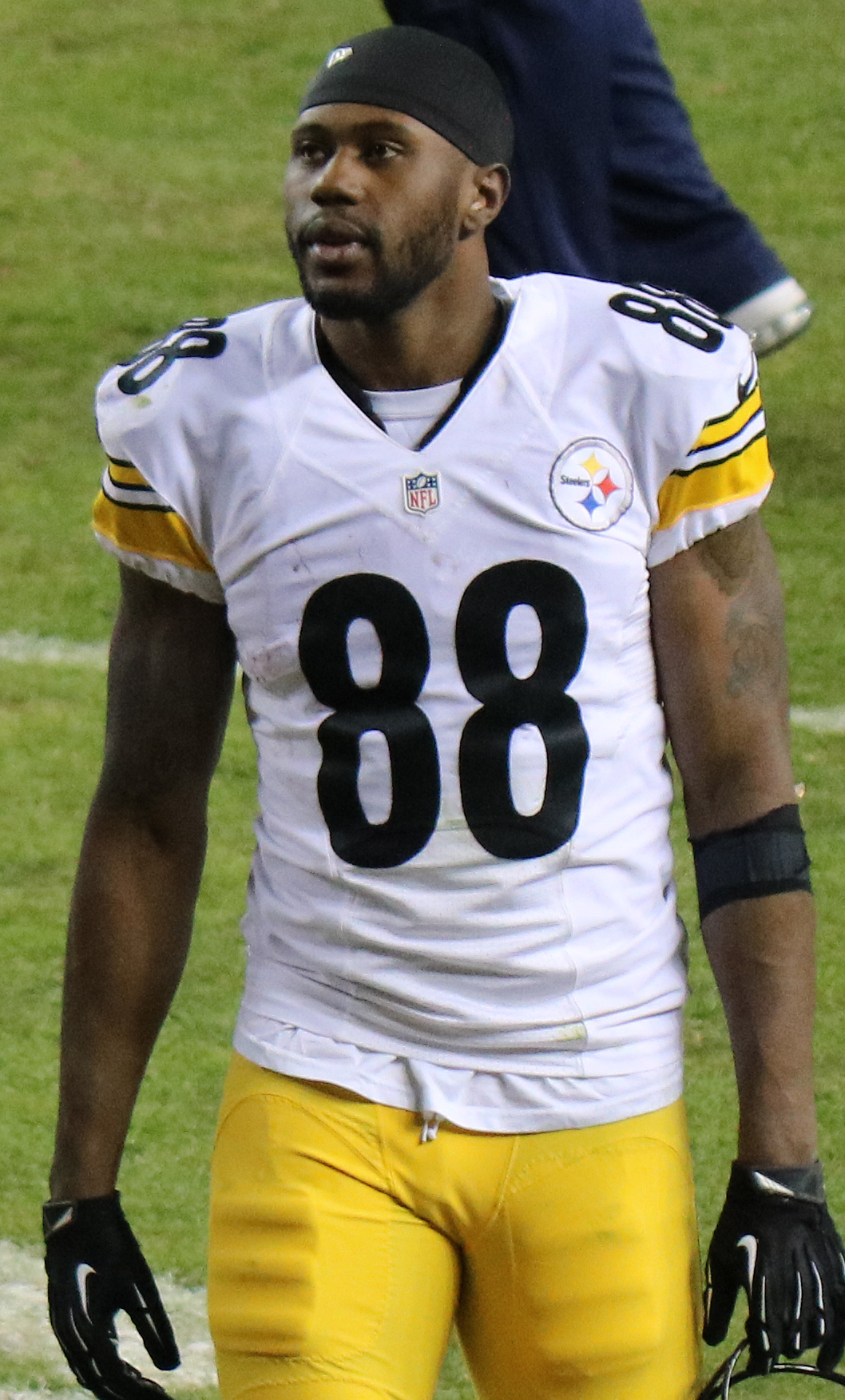
- Heyward-Bey with the Pittsburgh Steelers in 2016

No. 12, 85, 8, 81, 88
- Position: Wide receiver

Personal information
- Born: February 26, 1987 (age 39); Silver Spring, Maryland, U.S.
- Listed height: 6 ft 2 in (1.88 m)
- Listed weight: 210 lb (95 kg)

Career information
- High school: McDonogh School (Owings Mills, Maryland)
- College: Maryland (2005–2008)
- NFL draft: 2009: 1st round, 7th overall pick

Career history
- Oakland Raiders (2009–2012); Indianapolis Colts (2013); Pittsburgh Steelers (2014–2018)

Awards and highlights
- Second-team All-ACC (2006)

Career NFL statistics
- Receptions: 202
- Receiving yards: 2,897
- Receiving average: 14.3
- Receiving touchdowns: 16
- Rushing yards: 194
- Rushing touchdowns: 2
- Stats at Pro Football Reference

Darrius Ramar Heyward-Bey (born February 26, 1987) is an American former professional football player who was a wide receiver in the National Football League (NFL). He played college football for the Maryland Terrapins, and was selected by the Oakland Raiders seventh overall in the 2009 NFL draft. He also played for the Indianapolis Colts and Pittsburgh Steelers.

== Early life ==
Heyward-Bey attended the McDonogh School in Owings Mills, Maryland, where he played football as a wide receiver and linebacker. During his senior year, he earned first-team all-state honors and was named a PrepStar All-American.

In track and field, Heyward-Bey finished fifth at nationals as a junior and was the Maryland Interscholastic Athletic Association (MIAA) champion in the 100 meters, with a time of 10.44 seconds and in the 200 meters, with a time of 22.44 seconds. He also ran a 60 meters indoor time of 6.83 seconds his junior year and 6.82 seconds his senior year, that joint 6th and joint 4th fastest times in the nation respectively. He also posted a personal best of 6.38 seconds in the 55 meters. He ran career-bests times of 10.3 seconds in the 100 meters and 21.10 seconds in the 200 meters at the 2005 IAAM Championships.

== College career ==
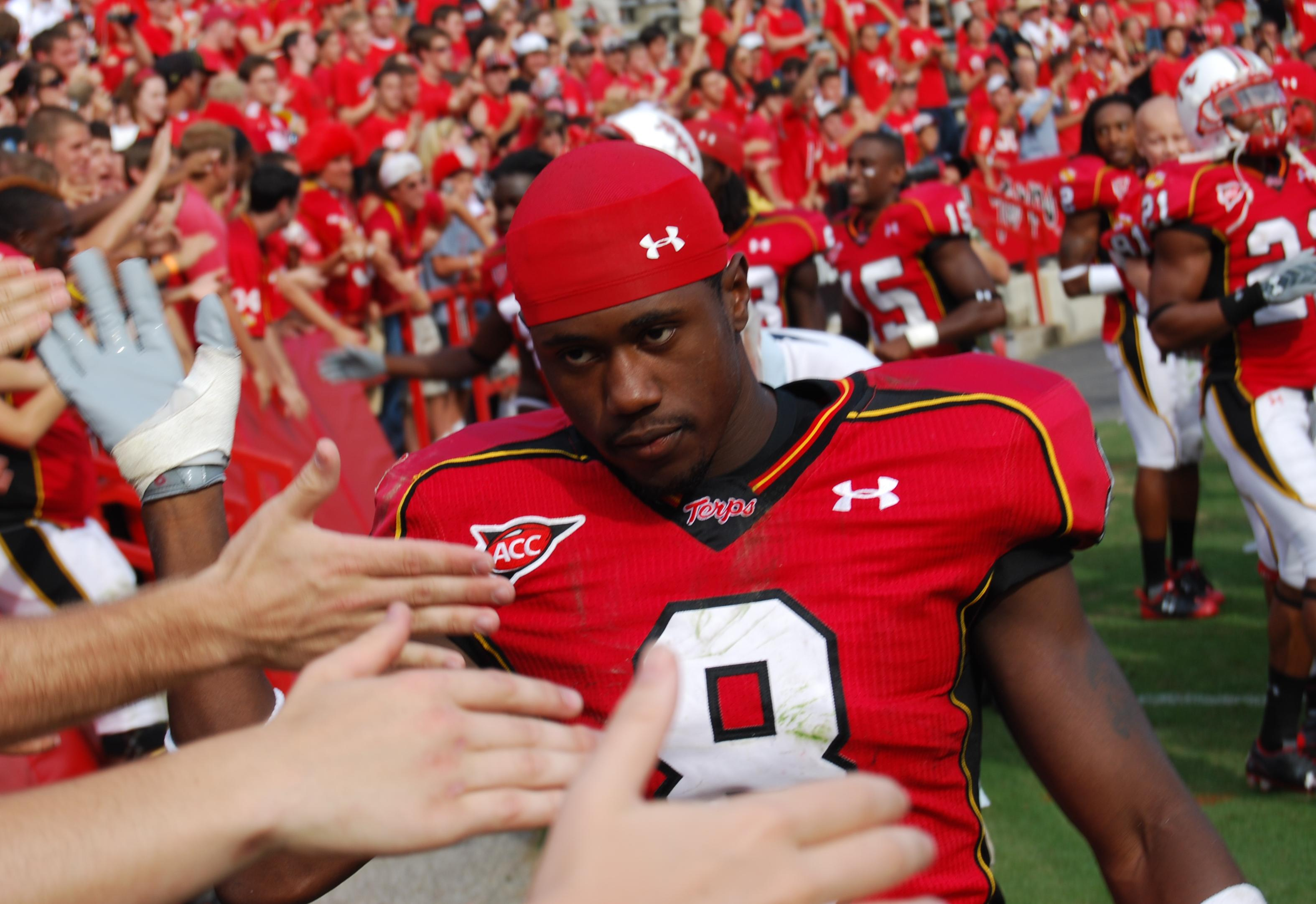
Heyward-Bey greets Maryland fans in 2008.

Heyward-Bey was recruited by Alabama, Boston College, Michigan State, Pittsburgh, and Virginia, before ultimately choosing to attend the University of Maryland, College Park, to play under head coach Ralph Friedgen.

He spent 2005 on redshirt status. In 2006, he ran a 4.23-second 40-yard dash, which set the school record for a wide receiver. That season, he was considered one of the top rookies in the Atlantic Coast Conference (ACC) and earned first-team freshman All-America from the Sporting News and Rivals.com. He led the Terrapins with 45 receptions, and set a school record for a freshman with 694 receiving yards.

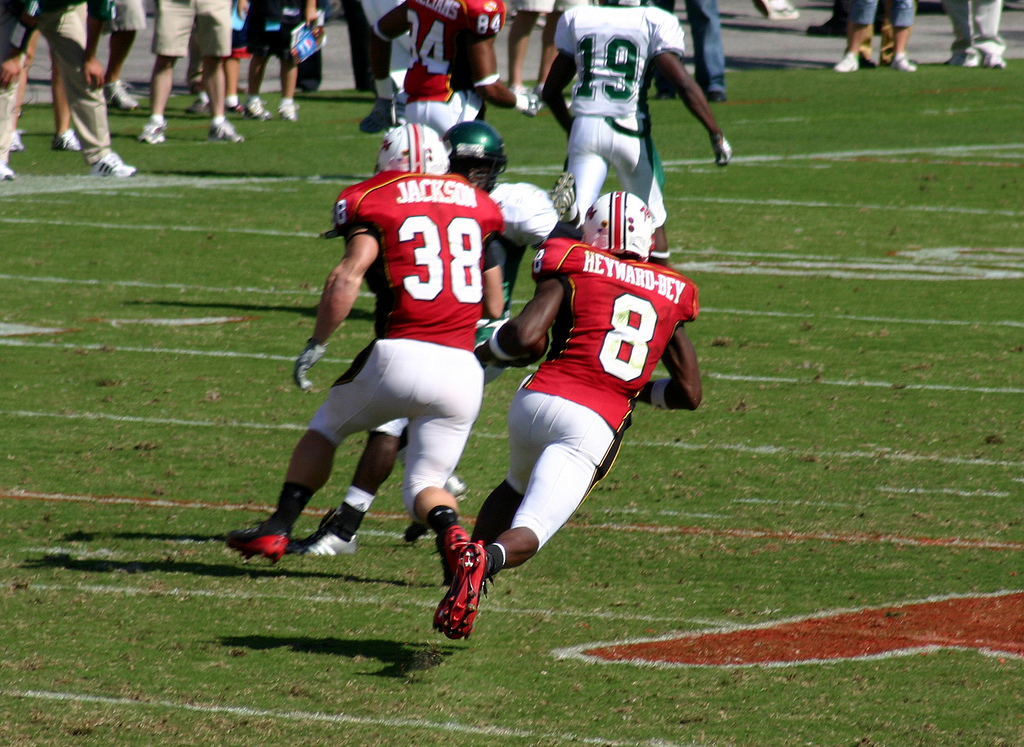
Heyward-Bey runs an end-around during the Terrapins' 51–24 victory over Eastern Michigan, September 20, 2008.

In 2007, Heyward-Bey was placed on the Biletnikoff Award watchlist. He led Maryland in receptions, with 51, and receiving yards, with 786. His 63-yard touchdown reception in the 2007 Emerald Bowl against Oregon State stands as the second-longest in Maryland bowl history. At season's end, Heyward-Bey was awarded the team's Most Valuable Offensive Player honor.

During his junior season in 2008, he made 42 catches for 609 yards and five touchdowns, and earned an All-ACC honorable mention. On January 7, 2009, Heyward-Bey announced that he would forgo his senior season to enter the NFL draft. He finished his career at Maryland second in school history in career receiving yards with 2,089, third in receptions with 138 and tied for third in touchdown catches with 13. In just three years, he was second only to Jermaine Lewis in receiving yards.

=== College statistics ===
Season	Team	Receiving					Rushing					
Season	Team	GP	Rec	Yds	Avg	Lng	TD	Att	Yds	Avg	Lng	TD
2006	Maryland	13	45	694	15.4	96	5	5	14	2.8	9	0
2007	Maryland	13	51	786	15.4	63	3	5	110	21.4	54	1
2008	Maryland	12	42	609	14.5	80	5	15	202	13.5	76	1
Career		37	138	1,958	15.1	96	13	25	326	13.0	76	2

== Professional career ==
Pre-draft measurables
Height	Weight	Arm length	Hand span	40-yard dash	10-yard split	20-yard split	20-yard shuttle	Three-cone drill	Vertical jump	Broad jump	Bench press	Wonderlic
6 ft 1 5/8 in (1.87 m)	210 lb (95 kg)	33 5/8 in (0.85 m)	9 in (0.23 m)	4.30 s	1.54 s	2.54 s	4.18 s	6.80 s	38.5 in (0.98 m)	10 ft 6 in (3.20 m)	16 reps	14
All values from NFL Combine

=== Oakland Raiders ===
==== 2009 ====
In the 2009 NFL draft, Heyward-Bey was selected in the first round by the Oakland Raiders as the seventh overall pick. As the first wide receiver selected, he was picked earlier than most projections, and before Michael Crabtree and Jeremy Maclin, who most analysts thought would precede Heyward-Bey. At the 2009 NFL Combine, he recorded a 40-yard dash time of 4.30 seconds.

During organized team activities following the draft, Heyward-Bey practiced early but was plagued by multiple hamstring injuries. On July 30, 2009, the Oakland Raiders agreed to terms on a five-year deal with Heyward-Bey worth $23.5 million. As a rookie, Heyward-Bey started 11 games, catching nine passes for 124 yards and one touchdown while rushing twice for 19 yards. He averaged 11.3 yards per reception in 2009.

==== 2010 ====
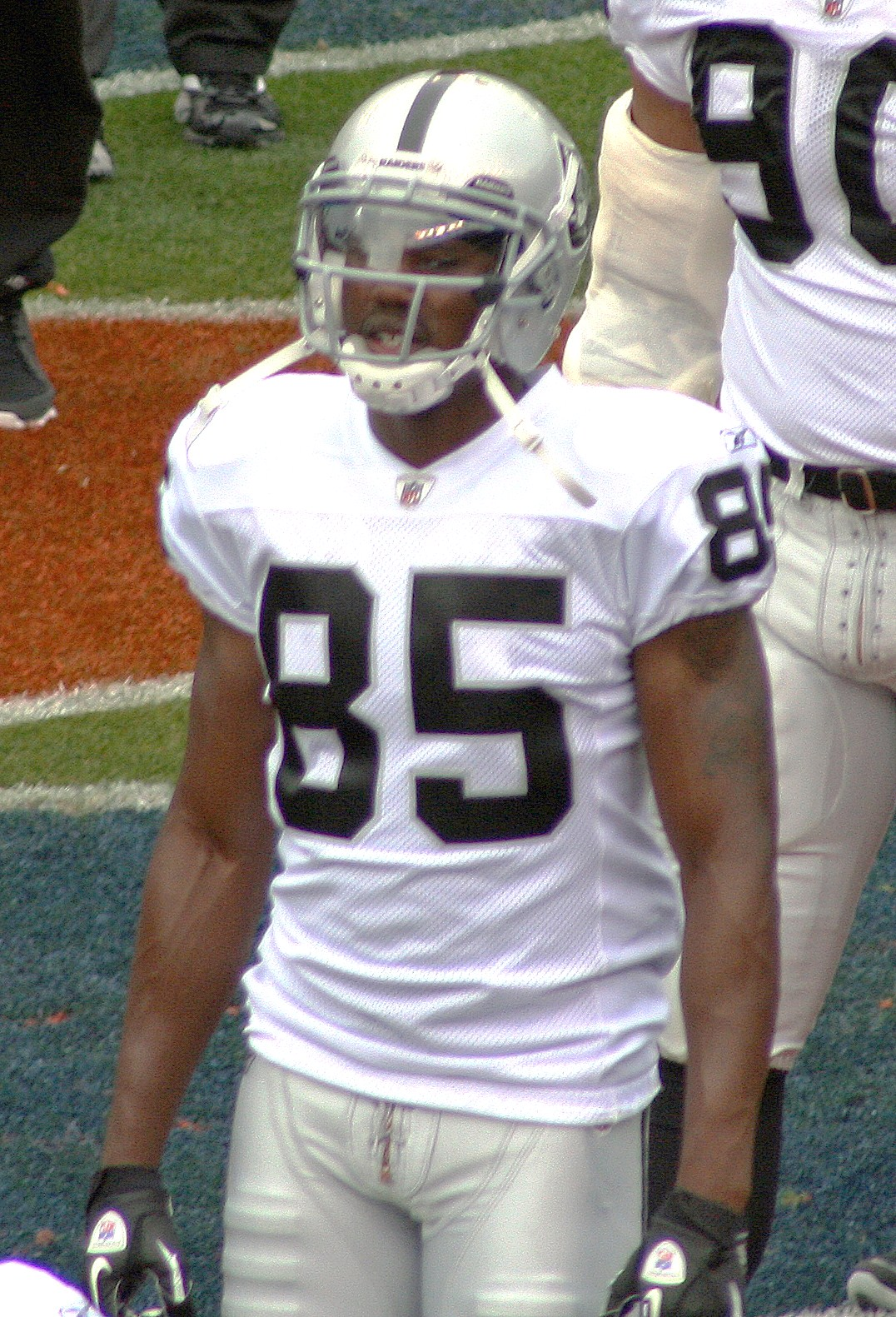
Heyward-Bey playing for the Oakland Raiders in 2010.

In 2010, Heyward-Bey started 14 of the 15 games in which he played. He had 26 receptions for 366 yards and one touchdown. On September 19 against the St. Louis Rams, Heyward-Bey had a career-high six receptions. Vittorio Tafur of the San Francisco Chronicle highlighted Heyward-Bey's performance in the game as a marked improvement from the preseason. On October 31, in a 33–3 victory over the Seattle Seahawks, Heyward-Bey made a career-long 69-yard touchdown reception from Jason Campbell, part of a career-high of 105 receiving yards.

==== 2011 ====
On October 2, 2011, in the Raiders' 31–19 loss to the New England Patriots, Heyward-Bey had four receptions for 115 yards, including a 58-yard reception. Over the next three games, he would compile receiving totals of 99 (October 9 against the Houston Texans), 82 (October 16 against the Cleveland Browns), and 89 (October 23 against the Kansas City Chiefs) yards. On December 18, 2011, in a 28–27 loss to the Detroit Lions, Heyward-Bey had eight receptions for 155 yards, both new career-highs, and the most single-game receiving yards for the Raiders since Jerry Rice in 2003. On December 24, the Raiders beat the Kansas City Chiefs 16–13 in overtime after Heyward-Bey caught a 53-yard pass from Carson Palmer during overtime to set up Sebastian Janikowski's winning field goal. Heyward-Bey had a total of four receptions for 70 yards in the game. On January 1, during a loss to the San Diego Chargers, Heyward-Bey caught nine passes for 130 yards and a touchdown.

==== 2012 ====
On September 23, 2012, in the fourth quarter of a game against the Pittsburgh Steelers, Heyward-Bey was left unconscious after a hit in the endzone by the Steelers' Ryan Mundy. Heyward-Bey was motionless in the endzone for more than 10 minutes before being placed in an ambulance to the Eden Medical Center in Castro Valley. Heyward-Bey was released from the hospital the next day. Mundy would be later fined for the hit. Overall, in the 2012 season, he had 41 receptions for 606 receiving yards and five receiving touchdowns.

Heyward-Bey was released by the Raiders on March 13, 2013.

=== Indianapolis Colts ===
Heyward-Bey signed a one-year deal worth up to $3 million with the Indianapolis Colts on April 1, 2013. Heyward-Bey finished the 2013 season with 29 receptions for 309 yards and a touchdown.

=== Pittsburgh Steelers ===
==== 2014 ====
On April 2, 2014, Heyward-Bey signed a one-year contract with the Pittsburgh Steelers.

He entered his first training camp with the Steelers competing with Lance Moore, Derek Moye, Martavis Bryant, and Justin Brown for the third wide receiver position. He was named the fifth receiver on the depth chart to begin the regular season.

As the fifth receiver, he appeared in all 16 games but caught only three passes for 33 yards and played predominantly on special teams.

Against the Ravens in the Steelers' Wild Card Round playoff loss to the Baltimore Ravens, Heyward-Bey made one reception for six yards, marking the first postseason catch of his career.

==== 2015 ====
The Steelers re-signed Heyward-Bey to a one-year contract on March 26, 2015.

Following the release of Lance Moore on March 2 and the four-game suspension of Martavis Bryant on August 31, Heyward-Bey became the Steelers' third receiver behind Antonio Brown and Markus Wheaton to begin the 2015 season.

In the regular season opener against the New England Patriots, Heyward-Bey caught four passes for 58 yards, including a reception of 43 yards. The following week against the San Francisco 49ers, Heyward-Bey again caught four passes, this time for 77 yards and one touchdown, marking his highest receiving yardage total since December 6, 2012.

Heyward-Bey finished the 2015 regular season with 21 receptions for 314 yards and two touchdowns. In the Divisional Round against the Denver Broncos, he made two receptions for 64 yards.

==== 2016 ====
On March 8, 2016, the Steelers re-signed Heyward-Bey on a three-year, $3.8 million contract.

He entered training camp competing to be the second or third wide receiver on the Steelers' depth chart, with Martavis Bryant suspended for the entire 2016 season. Heyward-Bey was named the fourth receiver behind Antonio Brown, Markus Wheaton, and Sammie Coates.

Against the Miami Dolphins in Week 6, he carried the ball on a reverse for a 60-yard touchdown for both his longest career rushing attempt and first career rushing touchdown.

However, in Week 9 against the Baltimore Ravens, he sustained a foot and ankle injury which sidelined him for the next six games. He returned for the Steelers' Week 16 rematch against the Ravens, though he did not make any receptions. In Week 17 against the Cleveland Browns, Heyward-Bey caught one pass for 46 yards for his longest reception of the season. This brought his 2016 regular season total to six receptions for 114 yards and two touchdowns.

In the Steelers' opening round playoff game against the Miami Dolphins, Heyward-Bey caught one pass for 10 yards in the Wild Card Round win.

==== 2017 ====
Heyward-Bey entered training camp in 2017 facing stiff competition for the backup wide receiver position from JuJu Smith-Schuster, Cobi Hamilton, Eli Rogers, Sammie Coates, and Justin Hunter. He was initially named the fourth wide receiver behind Antonio Brown, Martavis Bryant, and Rogers, but was passed on the depth chart by Smith-Schuster early in the season.

Heyward-Bey got his first touch of the season on offense in Week 4 against the Baltimore Ravens, carrying the ball on a reverse for three yards. He earned his first passing target and reception in Week 7 against the Cincinnati Bengals on a fake punt when he and teammate Robert Golden connected for 44 yards.

In Week 17 against the Cleveland Browns, Heyward-Bey scored a 29-yard rushing touchdown on a reverse.

Heyward-Bey finished the 2017 season with two receptions for 47 yards. In addition, he contributed on special teams.

==== 2018 ====
Heyward-Bey appeared in 14 games for the Steelers in 2018, making two starts. He finished the season with one reception for 9 yards and played a role in special teams. The Steelers elected not to re-sign Heyward-Bey following the 2018 season.

== Personal life ==
Heyward-Bey's mother, Vivian, a certified accountant, has helped him save much of his career earnings, despite the majority of it having been his rookie deal in 2007.
