= Completion (gridiron football) =

Term used in American football

In gridiron football, a completion or completed pass occurs when an eligible receiver (usually a wide receiver, tight end or running back) successfully catches a forward pass thrown by the quarterback without the ball touching the ground. It is one of the three possible outcomes of any pass thrown during a passing play, with the other two being incompletion and interception.

Statistically, a completed pass is recorded down as a completion for the quarterback, and as a reception for the player catching the ball. The recorded yardage gained is the total yardage gained when the play ends, and may be subdivided into Air Yards (the distance from the line of scrimmage to the spot where the ball was caught) and Yards After Catch (the distance from where the ball was caught to where the play ends on the field or out of bounds).
