= 2007 Emerald Bowl =

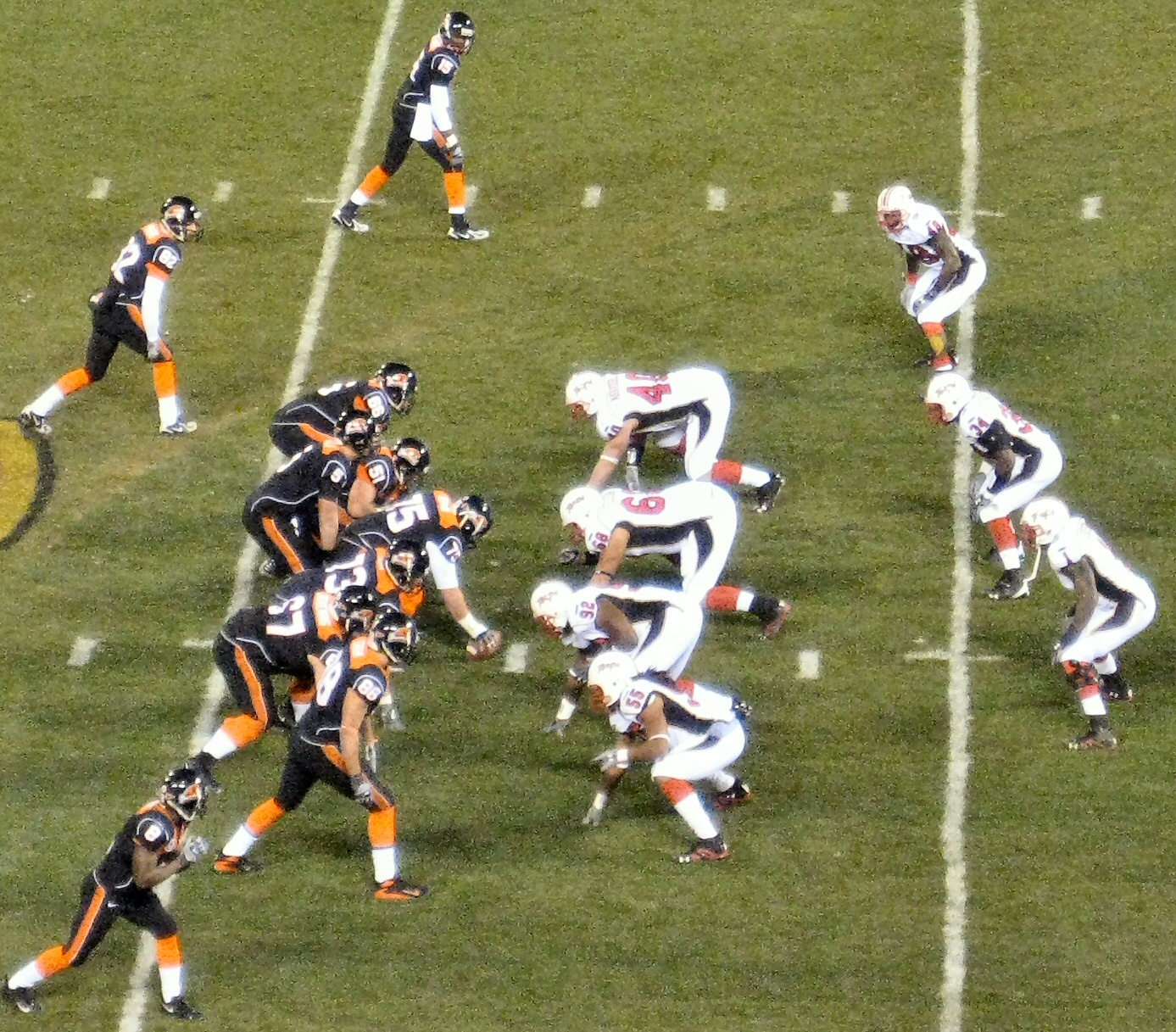
- Oregon State on offense
| Maryland Terrapins | Oregon State Beavers |
| (6–6) | (8–4) |
| ACC | Pac-10 |
| 14 | 21 |
| Head coach: Ralph Friedgen | Head coach: Mike Riley |
| | 1 | 2 | 3 | 4 | Total |
|---|---|---|---|---|---|
| Maryland | 14 | 0 | 0 | 0 | 14 |
| Oregon State | 7 | 7 | 7 | 0 | 21 |
- Date: December 28, 2007
- Season: 2007
- Stadium: AT&T Park
- Location: San Francisco, California
- MVP: Offensive: Yvenson Bernard (OSU); Defensive: Derrick Doggett (OSU)
- Favorite: Oregon State by 5
- Referee: Paul Labenne (WAC)
- Attendance: 32,517

United States TV coverage
- Network: ESPN
- Announcers: Sean McDonough, Chris Spielman

The 2007 Emerald Bowl, one of the 2007–08 NCAA football bowl games, was played on December 27, 2007, at AT&T Park in San Francisco, California, with the Atlantic Coast Conference represented by the Maryland Terrapins against the Oregon State Beavers, representing the Pacific-10 Conference.

The Terrapins scored all of their 14 points in the first quarter, while the Beavers scored successive touchdowns in the first, second and third quarters to win the game 21–14. Running back Yvenson Bernard and linebacker Derrick Doggett were the game MVPs.
