= Ralph Friedgen =

American football player and coach (born 1947)

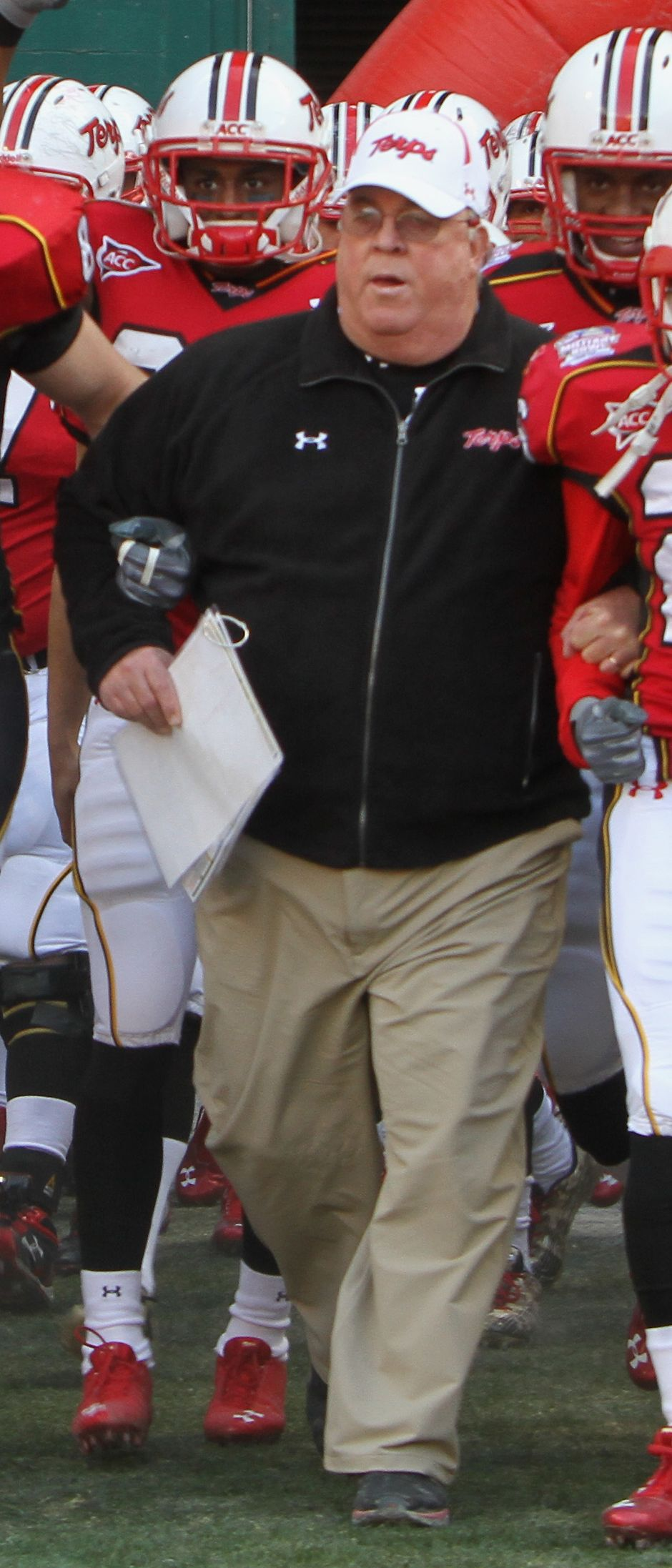
- Friedgen in 2010

Biographical details
- Born: April 4, 1947 (age 79); Harrison, New York, U.S.

Playing career
- 1966–1968: Maryland
- Position: Offensive guard

Coaching career (HC unless noted)
- 1969–1972: Maryland (GA)
- 1973–1976: The Citadel (DL)
- 1977–1979: The Citadel (OC)
- 1980: William & Mary (OC)
- 1981: Murray State (OC)
- 1982–1986: Maryland (OC/OL)
- 1987–1991: Georgia Tech (OC/QB)
- 1992–1993: San Diego Chargers (RGC/TE)
- 1994–1996: San Diego Chargers (OC)
- 1997–2000: Georgia Tech (OC/QB)
- 2001–2010: Maryland
- 2014: Rutgers (OC)
- 2015: Rutgers (special assistant)

Head coaching record
- Overall: 75–50
- Bowls: 5–2

Accomplishments and honors

Championships
- 1 ACC (2001)

Awards
- Broyles Award (1999); AFCA COY (2001); Associated Press COY (2001); Eddie Robinson COY (2001); George Munger Award (2001); Home Depot COY (2001); Sporting News COY (2001); Walter Camp COY (2001); Woody Hayes Trophy (2001); Bobby Dodd COY (2001); 2× ACC Coach of the Year (2001, 2010)

Ralph Harry Friedgen (born April 4, 1947) is an American former football coach. He was most recently the special assistant coach for Rutgers in 2015 after serving as their offensive coordinator in the 2014 season. He was the head coach for the Maryland Terrapins from 2000 to 2010. Friedgen was previously an offensive coordinator at Maryland, Georgia Tech, and in the National Football League (NFL) with the San Diego Chargers.

== Early life and education ==
Friedgen was born on April 4, 1947, in Harrison, New York. His father, "Big Ralph" Friedgen, attended Fordham University, where he played from 1938 to 1939, and coached high school football for 30 years. The younger Friedgen worked under his father as a water boy and manager, and the two often attended New York Giants and Jets games together. He attended Harrison High School where he played quarterback on his father's team. John Nugent, the head coach of Harrison's rival Rye High School, recommended that his brother, Maryland head coach Tom Nugent, recruit Friedgen. His recruitment was handled by Lee Corso, then an assistant coach at the school. After his first season at Maryland, Nugent was fired as head coach, and his successor Lou Saban moved Friedgen to fullback to fill in for an injured teammate. The following year, Maryland had a new coach, and Bob Ward again changed Friedgen's position, this time to offensive guard, although he had never blocked before. Upset about the constant turnover at head coach and position changes, Friedgen received a favorable recommendation to transfer from coach Ward, but his father said, "You can transfer, but when you get home, the key you have is not going to fit the door because we're changing the lock. Quitters don't live here." He remained at Maryland as a guard and later said the experience taught him a lesson in perseverance. As an undergraduate, he was a member of Phi Delta Theta fraternity. After completion of his bachelor's degree in physical education in 1970, Friedgen served as a graduate assistant at his alma mater, before later accepting positions on the staffs of The Citadel, William and Mary, and Murray State. Joining him on many of these coaching stops was Frank Beamer, who later served as head coach at Virginia Tech.

== Assistant coaching career ==
Friedgen returned to the University of Maryland in 1982 to serve as offensive coordinator under head coach Bobby Ross, who was his mentor during his tenure at The Citadel. During this time period, he had a hand in the development of quarterbacks Stan Gelbaugh and Frank Reich, and most notably Boomer Esiason. It was also during this time that the University of Maryland football program was a perennial top-20 team, winning three consecutive Atlantic Coast Conference championships from 1983 to 1985 and appearing in prominent bowl games. Following a sub-par 1986 season, and amidst an athletic department quagmire due in large part to the Len Bias incident, Friedgen followed Ross to Georgia Tech, a period lasting four years. In 1990, Georgia Tech went from being unranked in the preseason to achieving an 11-0-1 record and a share of the national championship with Colorado. In 1992, Friedgen followed Ross again, this time to the NFL's San Diego Chargers, where he orchestrated an offense that led the franchise to an appearance in Super Bowl XXIX. In 1997, Friedgen returned to Georgia Tech, where, as offensive coordinator, he developed the balanced offensive attack (200 yards on the ground, 200 yards through the air) that would become his trademark. During his second year, the Yellow Jackets were co-champions of the ACC, defeated Notre Dame in the Gator Bowl, and ended the season ranked among the nation's top 10 teams. In 1999, he was the winner and awarded the Frank Broyles Award, given to the nation's top assistant coach. Friedgen brought 32 years of assistant coaching experience (including 21 years as an offensive coordinator either in college or the NFL) with him upon his return to College Park.

== Head coaching career ==
In November 2000, Friedgen was named the head coach of the University of Maryland football team. He was charged with rebuilding a struggling program that had only one winning season and no bowl game appearances since 1990.

=== 2001 season ===
Friedgen's tenure opened against North Carolina, and early in the first quarter, running back Willie Parker ran 77 yards for a touchdown. Maryland came back to win, 23–7, which made Friedgen the first Terrapins coach to win his opener since Tom Nugent in 1959. During the season, Friedgen led Maryland to a surprising 10–2 record, a top 10 national ranking, the first outright Atlantic Coast Conference (ACC) title by a team other than Florida State since the Seminoles entered the league in 1992 and the school's first conference title since 1985, and an appearance in the 2002 Orange Bowl—the Terrapins' first major bowl bid in more than two decades. Friedgen received numerous "Coach of the Year" plaudits including the Bobby Dodd Coach of the Year Award, the Eddie Robinson Coach of the Year, The Home Depot Coach of the Year Award, and the Walter Camp Coach of the Year.

Throughout the year, Friedgen had challenged his players with the phrase "Are you in or are you out?" After the dramatic first-year turnaround, he was a high-profile candidate for an NFL position, and his players repeated his question. He remained at Maryland and said, "Last year the kids made a commitment to me and I realized it was my turn. We've got plenty left to do. This program has not yet arrived."

=== 2002 season ===
A thousand years ago, everybody knew the Earth was the center of the universe. Five hundred years ago, they knew the Earth was flat. Fifteen minutes ago, you knew Maryland could never win a bowl game. Imagine what you'll know... tomorrow.

— Ralph Friedgen

Friedgen's second year began with a 1–2 record, and he implored his team to consider it the start of a "new season". Maryland then won nine of its remaining ten regular season games, including a come-from-behind homecoming victory against the Philip Rivers-led 15th-ranked NC State team. Sports Illustrated credited a "stifling defense", dynamic special teams play, and an offense that thrived under quarterback Scott McBrien and a simplified playbook despite the loss of leading rusher Bruce Perry to injury. Maryland ended the season with a 30–3 victory over Tennessee in the 2002 Peach Bowl, the school's first bowl victory since the Cherry Bowl in 1985. In response to Friedgen's comments at the Peach Bowl's post-game press conference, he was reprimanded by the University of Maryland Faculty Senate for plagiarizing Tommy Lee Jones's character Agent K from the movie Men in Black; Friedgen apologized. The team achieved a final record of 11–3, matching the school record for wins in a season first set by the 1976 team.

=== 2003 season ===
In 2003, the Terrapins finished with a 10–3 record, including a 41–7 victory over rival West Virginia in the 2004 Gator Bowl. The University of Maryland football team became one of five programs nationally to reach the ten-win plateau from 2001 to 2003, and Friedgen became the first coach in ACC history to win ten or more games in his first three seasons as a head coach.

=== 2004 season ===
The 2004 season was the first disappointment of Friedgen's tenure, and the team failed to qualify for a bowl game. Highlights included, on October 30, an upset of fifth-ranked Florida State to take away the first-ever Maryland win in that series, as well as the first defeat of a top-five team since 1982. On November 27, a 13–7 win over Wake Forest gave Friedgen his 36th win as head coach, which made him the winningest fourth-year coach in conference history.

=== 2005 season ===
The 2005 season again saw Maryland fail to qualify for a bowl game. Friedgen's team started out with a 4–2 start, but a lack of offensive efficiency and a propensity for unforced turnovers—both of which may be attributed in part to an injury sustained by quarterback Sam Hollenbach—caused the team to win only one of its last five games to finish with a 5–6 record for a second consecutive season. The 2005 season did see the first Crab Bowl Classic game since 1965.

=== 2006 season ===
After two losing seasons, Friedgen led a Maryland resurgence in 2006 and ended speculation on his job security. The Baltimore Sun surmised that Friedgen would have repeated as ACC Coach of the Year had it not been for Wake Forest's impressive season under Jim Grobe. Maryland qualified for a bowl game for the first time since 2003. Despite being outgained by every one of its eleven Division I FBS opponents, the Terrapins started the season 8–2, highlighted by a 28–26 victory over Virginia in which the team stormed back from a 20–0 halftime deficit to defeat the Cavaliers. Maryland also became the first team since 1985 to defeat both Florida State and Miami in the same year. The Terrapins defeated Purdue 24–7 in the Champs Sports Bowl to give Friedgen his 50th win as Maryland's head coach. Friedgen's 50 wins in six seasons ties him with former North Carolina head coach Dick Crum for the second most wins by a sixth-year coach in the ACC (former Clemson head coach Danny Ford holds the record with 52 wins in his first six seasons.)

=== 2007 season ===
The 2007 season saw Maryland defeat tenth-ranked Rutgers on the road, as well as eighth-ranked Boston College in the regular-season home finale. This marked the first time in history that the school had beaten two top-10 teams in the same season. Maryland joined Kentucky, LSU, and Illinois as the only teams to accomplish this feat in 2007. A 37–0 shutout of NC State allowed the Terrapins to qualify for postseason play for the fifth time in Friedgen's seven seasons.

On December 28, Maryland played Oregon State in the Emerald Bowl and scored on the first drive. The Terrapins eventually lost, 21–14.

=== 2008 season ===
Maryland entered the 2008 season with 30 senior players, the largest class since Friedgen took over as head coach in 2001. Despite the experienced team, expectations were low and the ACC's preseason poll projected Maryland to finish fifth among the six teams in the Atlantic Division. At the end of summer training, and amidst some controversy, senior Jordan Steffy was named the starting quarterback over junior Chris Turner who had finished the 2007 campaign atop the depth chart.

In the season-opener, Maryland used all three of its quarterbacks to edge Division I FCS Delaware, 14–7. The following week, the Terrapins were beaten decisively by Middle Tennessee State, 24–14, and some pundits predicted Friedgen was on the coaching "hot seat" and that his job was in peril. Maryland rebounded to record wins against four Top-25 ranked opponents. In week twelve, the Terrapins possessed a 7–3 record and were ranked first in the Atlantic Division with two regular season games remaining. Maryland lost both, however, and the team's standing fell. The Humanitarian Bowl in Boise, Idaho, selected the Terrapins to play the Western Athletic Conference's number-two team, Nevada. In an offensive shoot-out against the nation's number-five offensive team, Maryland triumphed with a final result of 42–35. The Terrapins posted an 8–5 (4–4 ACC) record and Friedgen extended his postseason tally to 4–2, with twice as many bowl wins as any other coach in school history.

=== 2009 season ===
The Terrapins finished the season 2–10, with narrow victories against the James Madison Dukes and Clemson Tigers. Turnovers, a lack of talent, injuries, inexperience, and poor offensive line play were cited as causes for the poor season.

Friedgen's job security was questioned, but with a $1.75 million salary, there was some question as to whether the University of Maryland could afford to buy out his remaining contract. According to contracts, Friedgen was to retire after the 2011 season and James Franklin would have become the new head coach. The Baltimore Sun chronicled fans frustrations with Friedgen, his staff, and the arrangement with Franklin.

In November 2009, The Washington Post quoted anonymous sources that a buyout of Friedgen's contract of over $4 million was possible. Friedgen's attorney, Jack Reale, said that neither he nor Friedgen had been approached about a buyout. The article also said that Friedgen "privately resented" the athletic department naming Franklin his successor, due to how it affects other members of the coaching staff. It was also reported that Friedgen had support from the leaders of the Terrapin Club and the Maryland Gridiron Network booster groups. Two former Terp basketball players and prominent members of the State University system, Len Elmore and Tom McMillen, expressed doubt that public funds would be used to buy out Friedgen's contract, and boosters of the program said they knew of no effort to raise private funds for that purpose.

On December 1, 2009, Maryland announced Friedgen would return for the 2010 season.

=== 2010 season ===
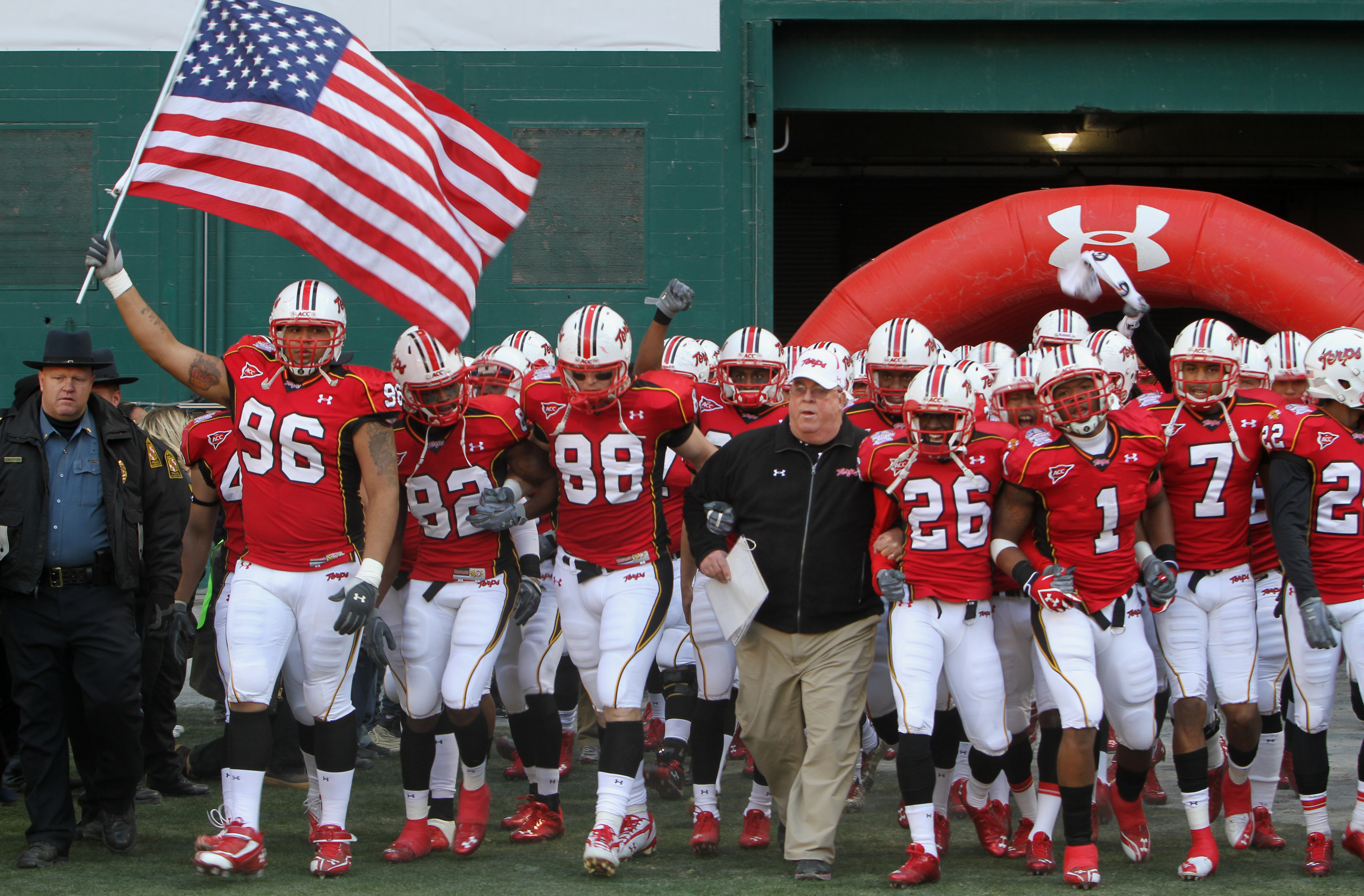
Friedgen and his team take the field in the 2010 Military Bowl

Maryland went 8–4 during the regular season. For the turnaround, the Atlantic Coast Conference named Friedgen the ACC Coach of the Year.

After Maryland won seven of its first 10 games, questions about Friedgen's job security diminished. On November 19, 2010, Maryland athletic director Kevin Anderson announced that Friedgen would return for the 2011 season, the final year of his contract. Despite this announcement, after offensive coordinator James Franklin accepted a job at Vanderbilt and offered positions to four other members of the staff, Anderson did not answer questions about Friedgen's future on December 17.

On December 18, 2010, it was reported in The Washington Post that the school was terminating him as head coach and offered a buyout of his remaining contract valued at $2,000,000. On December 20, 2010, athletic director Kevin Anderson made an official announcement that Friedgen would not be returning for the 2011 season. In an interview with WNST radio in Baltimore, Friedgen said he was so angry over the firing that he burned his Maryland diploma and was "flying a Georgia Tech flag right now," though he later clarified that he was joking and had not actually burned his diploma.

== Personal life ==
Friedgen has been married to his wife Gloria (née Spina) since 1973. They have three daughters.

== Head coaching record ==
Year	Team	Overall	Conference	Standing	Bowl/playoffs	Coaches^{#}	AP^{°}
Maryland Terrapins (Atlantic Coast Conference) (2001–2010)
2001	Maryland	10–2	7–1	1st	L Orange^{†}	10	11
2002	Maryland	11–3	6–2	T–2nd	W Peach	13	13
2003	Maryland	10–3	6–2	2nd	W Gator	20	17
2004	Maryland	5–6	3–5	T–8th			
2005	Maryland	5–6	3–5	T–4th (Atlantic)			
2006	Maryland	9–4	5–3	T–2nd (Atlantic)	W Champs Sports		
2007	Maryland	6–7	3–5	T–5th (Atlantic)	L Emerald		
2008	Maryland	8–5	4–4	T–3rd (Atlantic)	W Humanitarian		
2009	Maryland	2–10	1–7	6th (Atlantic)			
2010	Maryland	9–4	5–3	T–2nd (Atlantic)	W Military	24	23
Maryland:		75–50	43–37				
Total:		75–50					
National championship Conference title Conference division title or championship game berth
^{†}Indicates BCS bowl.; ^{#}Rankings from final Coaches Poll.; ^{°}Rankings from final AP Poll.
