= 2007 Miami Hurricanes football team =

American college football season

2007 Miami Hurricanes football
- Conference: Atlantic Coast Conference
- Coastal
- Record: 5–7 (2–6 ACC)
- Head coach: Randy Shannon (1st season)
- Offensive coordinator: Patrick Nix (1st season)
- Offensive scheme: Pro-style
- Defensive coordinator: Tim Walton (1st season)
- Base defense: 4–3 Cover 2
- Home stadium: Miami Orange Bowl

2007 Atlantic Coast Conference football standings
	Conf.			Overall
Team	W		L	W		L
Atlantic Division
No. 10 Boston College x	6	–	2	11	–	3
No. 21 Clemson	5	–	3	9	–	4
Wake Forest	5	–	3	9	–	4
Florida State	4	–	4	7	–	6
Maryland	3	–	5	6	–	7
NC State	3	–	5	5	–	7
Coastal Division
No. 9 Virginia Tech x$	7	–	1	11	–	3
Virginia	6	–	2	9	–	4
Georgia Tech	4	–	4	7	–	6
North Carolina	3	–	5	4	–	8
Miami (FL)	2	–	6	5	–	7
Duke	0	–	8	1	–	11
Championship: Virginia Tech 30, Boston College 16
$ – BCS representative as conference champion; % – BCS at-large representative; x – Division champion/co-champions; Rankings from AP Poll

The 2007 Miami Hurricanes football team, representing the University of Miami was Randy Shannon's first as head coach of his alma mater. It was also the last in which Miami played its home games in the Miami Orange Bowl. Miami was 5–7 for the season, which was their first losing season since going 5–6 in 1997.

== Changes ==
Miami finished the 2006 season with a 7–6 record, their worst since 1997's 5–6 campaign. Former head coach Larry Coker was fired, after continuous regression following a national championship his first season in 2001. Following a brief coaching search, Randy Shannon, previously the team's defensive coordinator, was hired by the University of Miami.

Since his hiring, Shannon has made several reforms. He has banned firearms, declaring any player carrying one will be dismissed from the team and the school. He also banned the use of cell phones during class, confiscating them from anyone caught with them for two weeks. He requires players maintain a 2.5 grade point average in order to live off campus, and any player who skips class faces extra conditioning as well as demotion on the depth chart. On July 24, Shannon announced to the press that the Hurricanes were stripping the names on the back of their jerseys for the 2007 season, which is highly unusual in Division I football. The Miami Herald then labeled Miami a "no name offense and defense".

Shannon has also hired with six new coaching assistants, headlined by offensive coordinator Patrick Nix, who held the same position in 2006 with Georgia Tech.

During meetings with the ACC media, Shannon stated he believes the team can rebound and win the ACC, saying "I don't expect anything less."

== Recruiting class of 2007 ==
Player	Position	Height	Weight	40-time	Hometown
Daniel Adderley	WR	6'6"	215	4.59	Simpsonville, SC
Allen Bailey	DE	6'3"	265	4.8	Darien, GA
Damien Berry	DB	5'11"	197	4.46	Belle Glade, FL
Jared Campbell	DB	6'0"	195	4.5	Aurora, CO
Lee Chambers	RB	5'10.5"	189	4.56	Coffeeville, MS
Graig Cooper	RB	5'11"	185	4.65	Memphis, TN
Kayne Farquharson	WR	6'2"	185	4.4	Homestead, FL
Orlando Franklin	OL	6'6"	300	5.47	Delray Beach, FL
Harland Gunn	OL	6'2"	300	5.2	Omaha, NE
Leonard Hankerson	WR	6'2"	185	4.4	Fort Lauderdale, FL
Tyler Horn	OL	6'5"	290	5.3	Memphis, TN
Robert Marve	QB	6'1"	189	4.65	Tampa, FL
Jermaine McKenzie	WR	6'1"	164	4.41	Bradenton, FL
Shawnbrey McNeal	RB	5'9"	181	4.45	Dallas, TX
Joseph Nicolas	S	6'2"	195	4.5	Homestead, FL
Adewale Ojomo	DE	6'3"	217	4.6	Hialeah, FL
Andres Arroyo	DT	6'7"	350	5.50	Miami, FL
DeMarcus Van Dyke	DB	6'1.5"	157	4.35	Miami, FL
Doug Wiggins	DB	5'11"	180	4.5	Miami, FL
Total commitments			19

In the pre-season, ESPN listed incoming running back Graig Cooper as one of the top-10 impact freshman for 2007.

== Personnel ==
Position	Name	Yrs. in current pos.
Head coach	Randy Shannon	1st
Offensive coordinator	Patrick Nix	1st
Defensive coordinator	Tim Walton	1st
Special teams / TEs	Joe Pannunzio	2nd
Quarterbacks	Patrick Nix	1st
Running backs	Tommie Robinson	1st
Wide receivers	Marques Mosley	2nd
Offensive line	Jeff Stoutland	1st
Defensive line	Clint Hurtt	2nd
Linebackers	Micheal Barrow	1st
Defensive backs	Wesley McGriff	1st
Strength & conditioning	Andreu Swasey	7th

== Preseason ==
Miami began the 2007 season unranked for the first time since 1998.

Three team members were selected to the ACC Pre-Season team: senior G Derrick Morse, junior DE Calais Campbell, and junior S Kenny Phillips.

On August 28, 2007, Head Coach Randy Shannon named Kirby Freeman the starting quarterback over Kyle Wright for the season-opening game against Marshall University.

== Schedule ==
Date	Time	Opponent	Site	TV	Result	Attendance
September 1	12:00 pm	Marshall*	Miami Orange Bowl; Miami, FL	ESPNU	W 31–3	39,830
September 8	12:00 pm	at No. 5 Oklahoma*	Gaylord Family Oklahoma Memorial Stadium; Norman, OK	ABC	L 13–51	85,357
September 15	3:30 pm	FIU*	Miami Orange Bowl; Miami, FL	ESPNU	W 23–9	40,915
September 20	7:30 pm	No. 20 Texas A&M*	Miami Orange Bowl; Miami, FL	ESPN	W 34–17	44,622
September 29	12:00 pm	Duke	Miami Orange Bowl; Miami, FL	CSS	W 24–14	30,614
October 6	12:00 pm	at North Carolina	Kenan Memorial Stadium; Chapel Hill, NC	ESPN2	L 27–33	59,000
October 13	12:00 pm	Georgia Tech	Miami Orange Bowl; Miami, FL	ESPN	L 14–17	52,416
October 20	3:30 pm	at Florida State	Doak Campbell Stadium; Tallahassee, FL (rivalry)	ABC	W 37–29	82,728
November 3	12:00 pm	NC State	Miami Orange Bowl; Miami, FL	ESPNU	L 16–19 ^{OT}	34,621
November 10	7:15 pm	No. 23 Virginia	Miami Orange Bowl; Miami, FL	ESPN2	L 0–48	62,106
November 17	3:30 pm	at No. 10 Virginia Tech	Lane Stadium; Blacksburg, VA (rivalry)	ABC	L 14–44	66,233
November 24	12:00 pm	at No. 15 Boston College	Alumni Stadium; Chestnut Hill, MA	ESPN	L 14–28	44,500
*Non-conference game; Rankings from AP Poll released prior to the game; All times are in Eastern time

The schedule was ranked as the #7 toughest road schedule.

After this season, the Hurricanes moved their home games from Orange Bowl Stadium to nearby Miami Gardens and Dolphin Stadium. They had been at the Orange Bowl for seventy years.

== Game summaries ==
=== Marshall ===
	1	2	3	4	Total
Thundering Herd	0	0	0	3	3
Hurricanes	10	7	7	7	31

The Hurricanes defeated Marshall in Randy Shannon's debut game, which was also the first between of the two teams.

The running backs provided the majority of the Hurricanes' offense, as sophomore Javarris James and true freshman Graig Cooper combined for 215 yards on the ground with James scoring two touchdowns. Starting quarterback Kirby Freeman completed only 9 of 21 passes for 86 yards, but was praised by Shannon for "controlling the game." Wide receiver Sam Shields sat out of the game for violating team rules.

Defensively, the Hurricanes made four interceptions, six sacks, and held Marshall to 51 rushing yards.

Following the game, James said, "We started off this year with a bang and hopefully we can continue."

=== Oklahoma ===
	1	2	3	4	Total
Hurricanes	3	7	3	0	13
#6 Sooners	14	7	10	20	51

The last time the Sooners and the Hurricanes had competed was in the 1988 Orange Bowl. Miami won 20–14 and earned its second national championship. The Sooners are 27–5 against current ACC members with three of those losses to the Hurricanes. The Sooners entered the game favored by between 10 and 11 points.

The Hurricanes were within one score halfway into the third quarter, before the game, nationally televised on ABC, became a washout for the Sooners. The Oklahoma defense was able to limit James and Cooper to a combined 54 yards. Freeman went 3 of 9 for only 17 yards before being benched in favor of former starter Kyle Wright, who led the Hurricanes on their only touchdown drive and completed 7 of 14 for 65 yards. The Hurricanes' defense was able to contain the Sooners, going into halftime with a 21–10 deficit, and scoring a field goal early in the third quarter to pull as close as 21–13, but Oklahoma quarterback Sam Bradford launched an aerial attack, going 19 of 25 for 205 yards and 5 touchdowns. The loss was the Hurricanes' biggest since 1998, when they were defeated by Syracuse 66–13.

=== FIU ===
	1	2	3	4	Total
Golden Panthers	0	0	3	6	9
Hurricanes	7	6	10	0	23

Last season was the first football game between the two cross-town schools. The Hurricanes won 35–0, but the game was most notable for its on-field brawl. Both teams hired new head coaches in the off-season; FIU was led by Mario Cristobal, who was previously the Hurricanes' offensive line coach.

The Hurricanes made changes following the Oklahoma defeat for the FIU game, the most noticeable of which was Shannon's decision to rename Kyle Wright, who was the starter last season before falling to injury, the starting quarterback. Wright went 10 of 19 for 224 yards, while Javarris James went for 92 yards as the Hurricanes won 23–9, extending FIU's losing streak to 15.

=== Texas A&M ===
	1	2	3	4	Total
#16 Aggies	0	0	0	17	17
Hurricanes	7	17	7	3	34

This was the second match between the Aggies and the Hurricanes, with the Aggies having won the 1944 game. The game was the final nonconference game of the season for both teams.

Despite being unranked, the Hurricanes entered the game three-point favorites over the undefeated 16th-ranked Aggies.

Played before a near-capacity crowd in the Orange Bowl and a national television audience on ESPN, the Hurricanes dominated the Aggies for much of the game, with a successful offense. By the time Aggies kicker Matt Szymanski put the first Texas A&M points on the board by way of a field goal in the fourth quarter, Miami had already scored 31. Kyle Wright led an effective passing attack, finishing 21–26 for 275 yards, and showing an ability to lead the Hurricane offense, which achieved 402 yards to A&M's 240. Defensively, the Hurricanes limited the Aggie's leading rushers Stephen McGee, Mike Goodson, and Jorvorskie Lane to 38 combined rushing yards in the first half and 98 yards overall – significantly less than their previous combined game average of 235 yards. Miami DE Calais Campbell, whose fumble recovery in the second quarter lead to a field goal that put the Hurricanes up 24–0 going into halftime, said of the statement victory: "Knowing this is the last year in the Orange Bowl, we want to make history here."

=== Duke ===
	1	2	3	4	Total
Blue Devils	0	0	7	7	14
Hurricanes	10	0	0	14	24

Duke entered the game with the 47th ranked pass offense in the nation, led by former Miami-area quarterback Thaddeus Lewis. Lewis threw for 241 yards, two touchdowns, and no interceptions against the Hurricanes, getting within a field goal in the fourth quarter. However, the Hurricanes' defense sacked Lewis nine times, helping the Hurricanes win the game 24–14.

Calais Campbell was named ACC Defensive Lineman of the Week as he totaled 16 tackles, including 2.5 sacks, 3.5 tackles for loss and two forced fumbles against Duke. He now places seventh in the conference in sacks, fourth in tackles for loss, and is tied for third in fumbles forced. Graig Cooper ran for 101 yards and a touchdown in only twelve carries. He also caught a pass for 25 yards, and was given ACC Rookie of the Week honors for this. Miami leads the overall series 4 to 1.

=== North Carolina ===
	1	2	3	4	Total
Hurricanes	0	0	20	7	27
Tar Heels	13	14	0	6	33

This was the first match between North Carolina, led by head coach Butch Davis, against his former team. For the Hurricanes, the first half included two Kyle Wright interceptions, six plays allowed for 18 yards or more, and a short missed field goal attempt. The Tar Heels' first half domination included a blocked punt that eventually led to a touchdown, and added to the 27–0 score at halftime. The second half was mostly controlled by Miami, who scored 27 points of their own – including a 97-yard touchdown catch by senior Darnell Jenkins. However, two North Carolina field goals in the fourth quarter and an errant Wright pass intercepted at the North Carolina 3-yard line (his fourth interception of the game) led to the Hurricanes losing.

=== Georgia Tech ===
	1	2	3	4	Total
Yellow Jackets	0	0	14	3	17
Hurricanes	7	0	0	7	14

The Hurricanes struck first with a 39-yard run by freshman Shawnbrey McNeal and took a 7–0 lead into halftime. The second half, however, was mostly controlled by the Yellow Jackets, who outgained the Hurricanes 244–79 in the half. Georgia Tech was led by running back Tashard Choice, who ran for a career-high 204 yards on 37 carries. A fourth-quarter touchdown pass from Kyle Wright to Sam Shields tied the game, but it was Travis Bell's 39-yard field goal with 7 minutes 34 seconds left that gave Georgia Tech the win.

Georgia Tech became the third team in the last 25 years to beat the Hurricanes in three consecutive seasons, joining Virginia Tech and Florida State (both of whom accumulated the wins during the Hurricanes' probation years). All three Georgia Tech wins came by a touchdown or less.

=== Florida State ===
Team	1	2	3	4	Total
• Miami (FL)	14	3	7	13	37
Florida State	10	10	6	3	29

- Date: October 20
- Location: Doak Campbell Stadium, Tallahassee, FL
- Game start: 3:30 p.m. EST

Scoring summary
1	8:44	FSU	Gary Cismesia 23-yard field goal	FSU 3–0
1	5:08	MIA	Kyle Wright 1-yard run (Daren Daly kick)	MIA 7–3
1	4:48	MIA	Graig Cooper 2-yard run (Daren Daly kick)	MIA 14–3
1	0:05	FSU	Xavier Lee 5-yard run (Gary Cismesia kick)	MIA 14–10
2	13:07	FSU	Toddrick Verdell 45-yard interception return (Gary Cismesia kick)	FSU 17–14
2	4:43	MIA	Daren Daly 44-yard field goal	Tied 17–17
2	0:15	FSU	Gary Cismesia 31-yard field goal	FSU 20–17
3	14:23	FSU	Gary Cismesia 33-yard field goal	FSU 23–17
3	6:23	MIA	Dajleon Farr 26-yard pass from Francisco Zampogna (Daren Daly kick)	MIA 24–23
3	2:49	FSU	Gary Cismesia 45-yard field goal	FSU 26–24
4	14:11	FSU	Gary Cismesia 45-yard field goal	FSU 29–24
4	1:15	MIA	Dedrick Epps 13-yard pass from Kirby Freeman (pass failed)	MIA 30–29
4	1:04	MIA	Colin McCarthy 27-yard fumble return (Darren Daly kick)	MIA 37–29

Florida State and the Hurricanes both entered this game unranked for the first time since 1977. The teams exchanged turnovers (nine total, five by FSU) and scores, staying close for most of the game. With 5 minutes 29 seconds left in the fourth quarter, the Hurricanes, losing 29–24, appeared to have lost their best chance to win when Kirby Freeman was stopped for no gain on a fourth-and-1 at the Florida State 1. But Freeman, who replaced injured Kyle Wright in the first half, drove Miami 83 yards in under two minutes to take the lead 30–29 on a 13-yard pass to Dedrick Epps with 1:15 left. FSU quarterback Xavier Lee, who was intercepted twice, then fumbled after being hit by Miami's Teraz McCray, and Colin McCarthy ran it in. This was the first game since 2001 that was decided by more than a touchdown.

Miami now leads the all-time series of the rivalry, 30–22.

=== NC State ===
	1	2	3	4	OT	Total
Wolfpack	0	7	0	9	3	19
Hurricanes	3	7	3	3	0	16

With Virginia and Virginia Tech both losing the week before, the Hurricanes has the potential to advance to the ACC Championship games, needing only to win out. A win would also make Miami bowl eligible. The Hurricanes opened the game with a 22-yard field goal to give it a 3–0 lead. The Hurricanes then took a 10–0 lead when quarterback Kirby Freeman completed his only pass of the game, an 84-yard touchdown pass to wide receiver Darnell Jenkins. NC State then became the first visiting team this season to score in the first half against the Hurricanes when with 2 minutes 4 seconds left until halftime, running back Daniel Evans took the ball in from one yard out to make the score 10–7 at the half.

There was just one score in the 3rd quarter which was a 33-yard field goal by the Hurricanes. The score was then 13–7 going into the fourth quarter. In the 4th quarter NC State scored 3 field-goals on their first three fourth quarter, bringing the score to 16–13. The Hurricanes got the ball with 6 minutes 55 seconds left in the game and drove down to the NC State 10-yard line, all on 15 running plays. With 33 seconds left the Hurricanes then tried two pass plays to wide receiver Sam Shields, both of which were broken up in the endzone. The Hurricanes were then forced to kick a 27-yard field goal to send it into overtime.

The Hurricanes got the ball first in overtime and chose 6 run plays to open. They then attempted another 27-yard field goal which sailed wide left. NC State then got the ball and kicker Steven Hauschka kicked a 42-yard field goal to win the game.

This was NC State coach Tom O'Brien's first win at the Orange Bowl. Miami quarterback Kirby Freeman, who was in for injured starter Kyle Wright, went just 1–14 with 84 yards and 3 interceptions. The Hurricanes rushed 60 times for 314 yards against the ACC's worst rush defense. Halfback Javarris James rushed for 103 yards. The loss dropped the Hurricanes to 5–4 overall and 2–3 in the ACC.

=== Virginia ===
	1	2	3	4	Total
#21 Cavaliers	14	17	7	10	48
Hurricanes	0	0	0	0	0

The Miami Hurricanes lose to the Virginia Cavaliers 48–0 in the worst shutout in Orange Bowl history on the Hurricanes' last game at the Miami Orange Bowl.

This loss dropped the Hurricanes to 2–4 in the ACC and 5–5 total.

=== Virginia Tech ===
	1	2	3	4	Total
Hurricanes	0	7	7	0	14
Hokies	14	3	13	14	44

=== Boston College ===
	1	2	3	4	Total
Hurricanes	0	0	7	7	14
Eagles	0	14	0	14	28

Miami lost to Boston College for the first time since 1984, and did not make a bowl game for the 1st first since 1997. While the Miami's defense finished 33rd in the nation, the offense finished 110th in the nation, their worst ranking for total offense in the modern era.

=== Offseason ===
UM strong safety Kenny Phillips and defensive end Calais Campbell made the decision to forgo their senior year and declare for the NFL Draft. Phillips was drafted in the first round No. 31 overall to the New York Giants while Campbell was drafted in the second round No. 50 overall to the Arizona Cardinals. Linebacker Tevarris Gooden was also drafted in the third round No. 71 overall to the Baltimore Ravens.
