= 2007 Wake Forest Demon Deacons football team =

American college football season

2007 Wake Forest Demon Deacons football

Meineke Car Care Bowl champion

Meineke Car Care Bowl, W 24–10 vs. Connecticut
- Conference: Atlantic Coast Conference
- Atlantic Division
- Record: 9–4 (5–3 ACC)
- Head coach: Jim Grobe (7th season)
- Offensive coordinator: Steed Lobotzke (5th season)
- Offensive scheme: Spread
- Defensive coordinator: Dean Hood (7th season)
- Base defense: 4–3
- Captain: Game captains
- Home stadium: BB&T Field

2007 Atlantic Coast Conference football standings
	Conf.			Overall
Team	W		L	W		L
Atlantic Division
No. 10 Boston College x	6	–	2	11	–	3
No. 21 Clemson	5	–	3	9	–	4
Wake Forest	5	–	3	9	–	4
Florida State	4	–	4	7	–	6
Maryland	3	–	5	6	–	7
NC State	3	–	5	5	–	7
Coastal Division
No. 9 Virginia Tech x$	7	–	1	11	–	3
Virginia	6	–	2	9	–	4
Georgia Tech	4	–	4	7	–	6
North Carolina	3	–	5	4	–	8
Miami (FL)	2	–	6	5	–	7
Duke	0	–	8	1	–	11
Championship: Virginia Tech 30, Boston College 16
$ – BCS representative as conference champion; % – BCS at-large representative; x – Division champion/co-champions; Rankings from AP Poll

The 2007 Wake Forest Demon Deacons football team represented Wake Forest University during the 2007 NCAA Division I FBS football season. The team was coached by Jim Grobe in his seventh season at the school and played its home games at BB&T Field. The team began its season with an Atlantic Coast Conference (ACC) game on Saturday, September 1, 2007 against Boston College. Wake Forest played its first season since winning the 2006 ACC championship, their first in 36 years.

== Preseason ==
Following the most successful season in team history in 2006, the 2007 team was not widely predicted to win the ACC despite returning many offensive starters from 2006. Some sports writers stated that they believed 2006 to have been a fluke and that Wake Forest was not going to win as many games in 2007, especially because of the losses on defense, including the loss of linebacker Jon Abbate to the National Football League. Wake Forest was picked to finish fourth in the Atlantic Division of the ACC in the annual preseason poll conducted by the Atlantic Coast Sports Media Association. Lindy's was the only major preseason magazine to pick Wake Forest as a Top-25 team.

=== Roster changes ===
Linebacker Eric Berry was ruled academically ineligible for the 2007 season.
Mike Rinfrette moved from fullback to linebacker in spring practice.

=== Recruiting ===
On National Signing Day, Wake Forest signed 20 recruits in all, eleven defensive players and nine offensive players.

=== Award candidates ===
- Steve Justice (C)- 2007 Lombardi Trophy Watch List; 2007 Outland Trophy Watch List; 2007 Rimington Trophy Watch List
- Zac Selmon (TE)- 2007 Wuerffel Trophy Nominee
- Riley Skinner (QB) 2007 Maxwell Award Watch List; 2007 Davey O'Brien National Quarterback Award Watch List
- Sam Swank (P)- 2007 Ray Guy Award Watch List

== Roster ==
**Bold indicates starter in last game** **Quarterbacks**: 6 Brett Hodges – (redshirt) Sophomore; 10 Zach MacDowall – (redshirt) Freshman; **11 Riley Skinner** – (redshirt) Sophomore; 12 Skylar Jones – Freshman; 13 Ryan McManus – Junior; **Running backs**: 3 Micah Andrews – (redshirt) Senior; 20 Lucas Caparelli – (redshirt) Freshman; 22 Brandon Pendergrass – Freshman; 23 Kevin Harris – (redshirt) Sophomore; **27 Josh Adams** – (redshirt) Freshman; 34 Willie Dixon – Freshman; 49 Jose Domenach – Freshman; **Wide receivers**: 4 Demir Boldin – (redshirt) Junior; 8 Marshall Williams – (redshirt) Freshman; 8 Geoff Wissing – Sophomore; 14 Kevin Marion – (redshirt) Senior; 15 Delon Lowe – (redshirt) Senior; 17 Christopher Langley – Sophomore; **21 Kenneth Moore** – (redshirt) Senior; 22 CJ Washington – Freshman; 24 Trey Schmidt – Senior; 36 Casey Hill – (redshirt) Sophomore; 36 Nicholas Schulz – Freshman; 37 Max Opamuratawongse – Senior; 48 Anthony Williams – Sophomore; 80 Devon Brown – Freshman; 81 Danny Dembry – Freshman; 82 Jordan Williams – Freshman; 86 Matt Hartford – Sophomore; **88 Chip Brinkman** – (redshirt) Junior; **Fullbacks**: **18 De'Angelo Bryant** – (redshirt) Senior; 35 Rich Belton – (redshirt) Junior; **Tight ends**: 83 Cameron Ford – Freshman; **84 Zac Selmon** – (redshirt) Senior; 85 Ben Wooster – (redshirt) Sophomore; 87 Ted Randolph – (redshirt) Sophomore; 89 John Tereshinski – (redshirt) Senior	**Offensive Linemen**: 60 Mike White – Freshman; 61 Barrett McMillin – (redshirt) Sophomore; 62 Doug Weaver – Freshman; **64 Jeff Griffin** – (redshirt) Sophomore; 65 Gage Crews – (redshirt) Sophomore; 67 Trey Bailey – (redshirt) Sophomore; 68 David Cox – Freshman; **70 Chris DeGeare** – Junior; 71 Ryan Britt – Freshman; 72 Russell Nenon – (redshirt) Freshman; 73 Cannon Gaskin – (redshirt) Freshman; **74 Steve Justice** – (redshirt) Senior; 75 Michael Hoag – Freshman; 76 Joe Birdsong – (redshirt) Sophomore; 77 Boomer Peterson – (redshirt) Sophomore; **78 Louis Frazier** – (redshirt) Senior; **79 Matthew Brim** – (redshirt) Senior; **Linebackers**: 28 Cyhl Quarles – Freshman; 35 Lee Malchow – Sophomore; **39 Chantz McClinic** – (redshirt) Junior; 40 Kyle Jarrett – Freshman; **43 Stanley Arnoux** – (redshirt) Junior; 44 Mike Rinfrette – (redshirt) Sophomore; 45 Mike Simmons – (redshirt) Junior; 46 Matt Woodlief – (redshirt) Freshman; 49 Michael Potteiger – Sophomore; 52 Dominique Midgett – (redshirt) Sophomore; 55 Tristan Dorty – Freshman; 56 Hunter Haynes – (redshirt) Freshman; 57 Gelo Orange – Freshman; **59 Aaron Curry** – (redshirt) Junior; 63 Andrew Conroy – Junior; 66 Collin Granger – Freshman; 94 Tripp Russell – (redshirt) Freshman; **Cornerbacks**: **2 Alphonso Smith** – (redshirt) Junior; 5 Marcus Williams – (redshirt) Freshman; **17 Brandon Ghee** – (redshirt) Sophomore; 24 Channing Schofield – (redshirt) Sophomore; 25 Josh Bush – Freshman; 29 Kerry Major – (redshirt) Junior; 41 Mike Williams – Freshman	**Safeties**: 7 Alex Frye – (redshirt) Freshman; **9 Chip Vaughn** – (redshirt) Junior; 10 Kevin Patterson – (redshirt) Junior; 25 Andrew Wright – Junior; 26 Jonathon Jones – (redshirt) Sophomore; 28 Peter Grimm – Freshman; 30 John Stamper – Freshman; **32 Aaron Mason** – (redshirt) Senior; 37 Junior Petit-Jean – Freshman; **Defensive ends**: 34 Antonio Wilson – (redshirt) Junior; **42 Matt Robinson** – (redshirt) Senior; 90 Will Wright – Freshman; 93 Anthony Davis – (redshirt) Junior; 94 Tripp Russell – (redshirt) Freshman; 97 Kyle Wilber – Freshman; **98 Jeremy Thompson** – Senior; **Defensive tackles**: 50 Teddy Tomlin – (redshirt) Freshman; 51 John Russell – (redshirt) Sophomore; 58 Michael Carter – (redshirt) Freshman; 91 Dennis Godfrey – Freshman; **95 Zach Stukes** – (redshirt) Senior; **96 Boo Robinson** – (redshirt) Sophomore; 99 Michael Lockett – (redshirt) Sophomore; **Place Kickers**: 30 Shane Popham – Freshman; 38 Sam Swank – (redshirt) Junior; 40 Zach Collins – Freshman; 69 Win Joyner – Freshman; **Punters**: 38 Sam Swank – (redshirt) Junior; **Long Snappers**: 53 Greg Bechtel – Sophomore; 92 Nick Jarvis – Senior; **Kick returners**: 2 Alphonso Smith – (redshirt) Junior; 14 Kevin Marion – (redshirt) Senior; 21 Kenneth Moore – (redshirt) Senior; **Punt Returners**: 21 Kenneth Moore – (redshirt) Senior

== Coaching staff ==
Position	Name	First year at WFU
Head coach	Jim Grobe	2001
Wide Receivers	Tim Billings	2006
Fullbacks / Tight ends	Tom Elrod	2003
Defensive ends	Keith Henry	2001
Defensive coordinator / Secondary	Dean Hood	2001
Linebackers	Brad Lambert	2001
Offensive coordinator / Offensive line	Steed Lobotzke	2001
Defensive tackles	Ray McCartney	2001
Assistant head coach / Running backs / Kickers	Billy Mitchell	2001
Quarterbacks	Jeff Mullen	2001

== Schedule ==
Date	Time	Opponent	Rank	Site	TV	Result	Attendance
September 1	3:30 pm	at Boston College		Alumni Stadium; Chestnut Hill, MA	ABC	L 28–38	42,292
September 8	12:00 pm	No. 17 Nebraska*		BB&T Field; Winston-Salem, NC	ESPN	L 17–20	32,483
September 15	3:30 pm	Army*^{†}		BB&T Field; Winston-Salem, NC	ACC Select	W 21–10	32,142
September 22	3:30 pm	Maryland		BB&T Field; Winston-Salem, NC	ESPNU	W 31–24 ^{OT}	31,964
October 6	1:00 pm	at Duke		Wallace Wade Stadium; Durham, NC (rivalry)	ACC Select	W 41–36	20,134
October 11	7:30 pm	No. 21 Florida State		BB&T Field; Winston-Salem, NC	ESPN	W 24–21	32,906
October 20	1:00 pm	at Navy*		Navy–Marine Corps Memorial Stadium; Annapolis, MD	CSTV	W 44–24	36,992
October 27	12:00 pm	North Carolina		BB&T Field; Winston-Salem, NC (rivalry)	LFS	W 37–10	33,023
November 3	12:00 pm	at Virginia	No. 21	Scott Stadium; Charlottesville, VA	LFS	L 16–17	60,106
November 10	12:00 pm	at No. 20 Clemson		Memorial Stadium; Clemson, SC	ESPN2	L 10–44	82,422
November 17	4:00 pm	NC State		BB&T Field; Winston-Salem, NC (rivalry)	ESPNU	W 38–18	33,052
November 24	2:00 pm	at Vanderbilt*		Vanderbilt Stadium; Nashville, TN		W 31–17	27,650
December 29	1:00 pm	vs. Connecticut*		Bank of America Stadium; Charlotte, NC (Meineke Car Care Bowl)	ESPN	W 24–10	53,126
*Non-conference game; ^{†}Homecoming; Rankings from Coaches' Poll released prior to the game; All times are in Eastern time

== Game summaries ==
=== @ Boston College ===
	1	2	3	4	Total
Demon Deacons	14	7	0	7	28
Eagles	7	14	14	3	38

=== Nebraska ===
	1	2	3	4	Total
Cornhuskers	3	10	7	0	20
Demon Deacons	0	10	7	0	17

=== Army ===
	1	2	3	4	Total
Black Knights	0	7	3	0	10
Demon Deacons	14	7	0	0	21

=== Maryland ===
	1	2	3	4	OT	Total
Terrapins	10	7	7	0	0	24
Demon Deacons	3	0	7	14	7	31

=== @ Duke ===
	1	2	3	4	Total
Demon Deacons	7	17	10	7	41
Blue Devils	9	0	14	13	36

=== Florida State ===
	1	2	3	4	Total
Seminoles	0	14	0	7	21
Demon Deacons	0	7	7	10	24

=== @ Navy ===
	1	2	3	4	Total
Demon Deacons	14	13	10	7	44
Midshipmen	10	7	7	0	24

=== North Carolina ===
	1	2	3	4	Total
Tar Heels	0	3	0	7	10
Demon Deacons	10	7	6	14	37

=== @ Virginia ===
	1	2	3	4	Total
Demon Deacons	3	3	7	3	16
Cavaliers	3	7	0	7	17

=== @ Clemson ===
	1	2	3	4	Total
Demon Deacons	7	0	3	0	10
Tigers	10	17	10	7	44

=== NC State ===
	1	2	3	4	Total
Wolfpack	0	3	15	0	18
Demon Deacons	7	14	7	10	38

=== @ Vanderbilt ===
	1	2	3	4	Total
Demon Deacons	7	7	17	0	31
Commodores	3	0	0	14	17

=== Vs. Connecticut ===
	1	2	3	4	Total
Huskies	7	3	0	0	10
Demon Deacons	0	0	14	10	24

== Postseason honors ==
=== Conference ===
- Steve Justice (C)- 2007 Jacobs Blocking Trophy
- All-ACC First Team

Kenneth Moore (WR)
Steve Justice (C)
Alphonso Smith (CB)

- All-ACC Second Team

Josh Adams (RB)
Aaron Curry (LB)

- All-ACC Honorable Mention

Chip Vaughn (S)
Sam Swank (K)
Kevin Marion (KR)

- Josh Adams (RB)- 2007 ACC Rookie of the Year and 2007 ACC Offensive Rookie of the Year
- Matt Robinson (DE)- 2007 ACC Brian Piccolo Award

=== National ===
- Steve Justice (C) - 2007 Rimington Trophy Finalist

2007 AFCA First Team All-American

- Louis Frazier (OT) - 2007 ESPN Academic All-American
