= Kyle Wright (American football) =

American football player (born 1984)

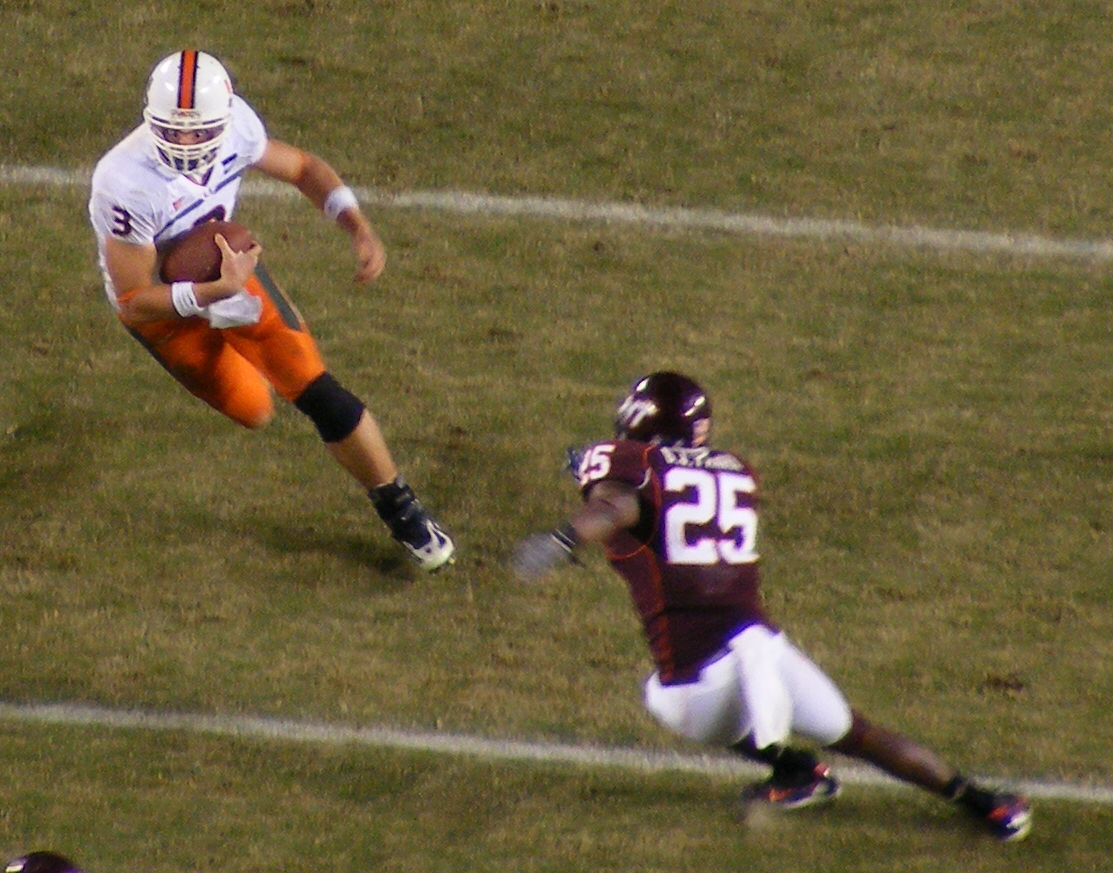
- Wright (left) carries the ball against Virginia Tech

Profile
- Position: Quarterback

Personal information
- Born: October 18, 1984 (age 42); Danville, California, U.S.
- Listed height: 6 ft 3 in (1.91 m)
- Listed weight: 220 lb (100 kg)

Career information
- High school: Monte Vista (Danville, California)
- College: Miami (FL)
- NFL draft: 2008: undrafted

Career history
- Minnesota Vikings (2008)*; San Francisco 49ers (2008)*
- * Offseason or practice squad member only

Kyle Wright (born October 18, 1984) is an American former football quarterback. He was signed by the Minnesota Vikings as an undrafted free agent in 2008 and was also a member of the San Francisco 49ers. He played college football at the University of Miami.

== Early life ==
Wright began his high school career as starting quarterback on the Vintage High School JV team, in Napa, California. Following his freshman year, he transferred to Monte Vista High in Danville, becoming the second-string quarterback for his first year and the starter his remaining 2 years. Wright was widely regarded as the nation's top high school quarterback for the 2002–2003 season, during which he was named the Gatorade National Player of the Year and SuperPrep National Player of the Year, as well as being ranked the fifth best overall player in the nation by both Scout recruiting magazine He participated in the 2003 U.S. Army All-American Bowl game.

Additionally, Wright was ranked the best pro-style quarterback in the class of 2003 by rivals.com while his cross-town rival, San Ramon Valley High School quarterback Sam Keller, future quarterback of ASU and Nebraska, was ranked ninth.

Ultimately, he chose Miami over offers from many other schools including Florida State, Southern California, and Tennessee.

== College career ==
Wright graduated from high school a semester early and enrolled at the University of Miami for the 2003 spring semester amidst great expectation that he would be the next great quarterback at “Quarterback U.” and continue in the lineage of Jim Kelly, Bernie Kosar, Vinny Testaverde, Steve Walsh, Craig Erickson, Gino Torretta, Ryan Clement and Ken Dorsey. Wright was redshirted for the 2003 season and spent the following season as Brock Berlin's backup before an ankle injury and an allergic reaction to a bee sting effectively ended his season after only a few games. With Berlin having graduated, Miami's starting quarterback job was open heading into the 2005 season. During spring practice, Wright performed well and earned the starting position over redshirt freshman Kirby Freeman.

=== 2005 season ===
Wright's first season as a starter showed his potential. A highlight came on November 12, 2005, when Wright tied a school-record by tossing 5 touchdown passes in a 47–17 blowout victory against Wake Forest.

Wright led Miami to a 9–3 record, the same as the previous season, including wins over nationally ranked Clemson and Virginia Tech. In the opening 10–7 loss to FSU, despite multiple dropped passes, Miami outgained FSU 313 yards to 170. Two missed field goals and a botched snap on a third fg attempt from 28 yards out to tie the game did them in. Wright and the Hurricanes rebounded by winning 8 straight games (including a 27–7 win over previously unbeaten Virginia Tech in Blacksburg) and climbed to the #3 spot in both polls. However, Wright struggled against some of the better teams on Miami's schedule (12 of his 18 touchdown passes came against teams with a losing record: Duke, Temple, and Wake Forest), and the 3-loss season included a 40–3 blowout loss to LSU in the Peach Bowl.

Wright led the ACC in touchdown passes (18), was second in pass efficiency to Virginia Tech's Marcus Vick, and was the only Honorable Mention All-ACC selection at quarterback.

=== 2006 season ===
Expectations were big for Wright heading into the 2006 season. Miami changed offensive coordinators, hiring Rich Olson, and implemented a new offense. Wright was selected as the quarterback on the Preseason All-ACC team, and finished second to Georgia Tech receiver Calvin Johnson in balloting for the ACC Preseason Player of the Year. Wright was also named to the Maxwell Award watchlist, and was projected as a potential Heisman Trophy candidate.

Wright played well at times but failed to meet the big preseason expectations for him, his struggles mirroring those of the team in general, which fell out of national championship contention by the third game of the season. In 9 games, Wright threw for 1,655 yards, 8 touchdowns, and 7 interceptions, and completed 60.8% of his passes.

Wright was booed during Miami's 17–10 homecoming loss to Virginia Tech, a game in which he threw two critical interceptions and played what was viewed as the worst game of his career. As Wright left the field, angry Miami fans berated him. Wright's father, who was in the area and hearing the vulgar insults, then engaged in a profanity laced tirade with those fans, and was restrained by Orange Bowl security and threatened with arrest by Miami Athletic Director when he started to exhibit aggressive behavior. After cooling off, Mr. Wright stated he was merely trying to stick up for his son.

Wright fractured his thumb during the loss to Virginia Tech, and the injury kept him out of the team's game the next week, a loss at Maryland. He underwent thumb surgery a week later, which caused him to miss the remainder of the 2006 season. He was replaced by Kirby Freeman for the remainder of the season. Freeman led Miami to a 2–2 record including a season ending upset of Boston College and a narrow win over Nevada in the MPC Computers Bowl on New Year's Eve.

=== 2007 season ===
The University of Miami promoted Randy Shannon to head coach and hired their third Offensive coordinator in three years, Patrick Nix from Georgia Tech. On August 28, 2007, Head Coach Randy Shannon named Kirby Freeman the starting quarterback over Kyle Wright for the season-opening game against Marshall. In two starts, Freeman went 12-of-30 for 98 yards with one touchdown and one interception, placing Miami 118th out of 119 major college schools in passing offense both in average yards per game and yards per attempt. On September 11, 2007, Shannon announced that Wright would reclaim his starting role for the September 15th game against FIU. The Hurricanes were 4–2 with Wright as the starter, including wins over FSU and nationally ranked Texas A&M, compared to 5–7 overall that year. An injury forced Wright to miss the team's final 4 games, the Hurricanes lost all four. Kyle Wright finished his final season with Miami by passing for 1,747 yards, and 12 touchdowns, and rushing for 66 yards and 3 touchdowns.

At the conclusion of his collegiate career, Wright's final statistics were as follows: 5,835 passing yards, 38 touchdowns, 31 interceptions. He rushed for −99 yards and 4 scores.

== Professional career ==
Pre-draft measurables
Height	Weight	Arm length	Hand span	40-yard dash	10-yard split	20-yard split	20-yard shuttle	Three-cone drill	Vertical jump	Broad jump
6 ft 3 3/8 in (1.91 m)	218 lb (99 kg)	33 in (0.84 m)	9 1/2 in (0.24 m)	4.84 s	1.67 s	2.80 s	4.32 s	6.97 s	31.0 in (0.79 m)	8 ft 9 in (2.67 m)
All values from NFL Combine/Pro Day

=== Minnesota Vikings ===
Following the conclusion of his Miami career, Wright worked out with quarterbacks coach Tom Martinez in Northern California. In April 2008, Wright told the Miami Herald he expected to be selected in the NFL Draft, most likely on day two.

Wright was not drafted, but on April 28, 2008, signed a free agent contract with the Minnesota Vikings. He was waived by the team on July 2.

=== San Francisco 49ers ===
On July 7, it was announced that the San Francisco 49ers had claimed Wright off waivers from the Vikings while waiving quarterback Drew Olson to make room.
