= 2007 Boston College Eagles football team =

American college football season

2007 Boston College Eagles football
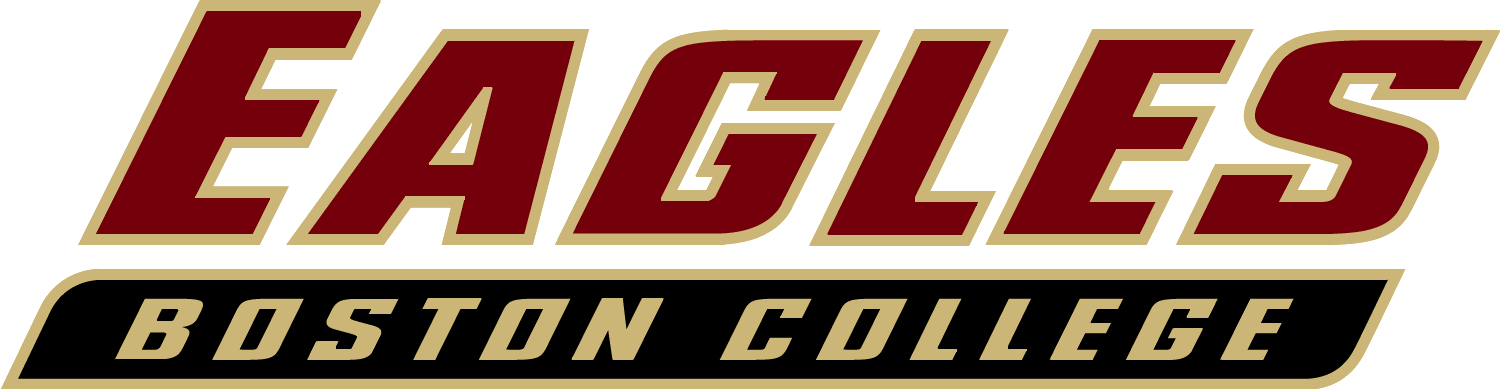

ACC Atlantic Division champion Champs Sports Bowl champion

ACC Championship Game, L 16–30 vs. Virginia Tech

Champs Sports Bowl, W 24–21 vs. Michigan State
- Conference: Atlantic Coast Conference
- Atlantic Division

Ranking
- Coaches: No. 11
- AP: No. 10
- Record: 11–3 (6–2 ACC)
- Head coach: Jeff Jagodzinski (1st season)
- Offensive coordinator: Steve Logan (1st season)
- Offensive scheme: Pro-style
- Defensive coordinator: Frank Spaziani (9th season)
- Base defense: 4–3
- Captains: Gosder Cherilus; Jo-Lonn Dunbar; Nick Larkin; Matt Ryan
- Home stadium: Alumni Stadium

2007 Atlantic Coast Conference football standings
	Conf.			Overall
Team	W		L	W		L
Atlantic Division
No. 10 Boston College x	6	–	2	11	–	3
No. 21 Clemson	5	–	3	9	–	4
Wake Forest	5	–	3	9	–	4
Florida State	4	–	4	7	–	6
Maryland	3	–	5	6	–	7
NC State	3	–	5	5	–	7
Coastal Division
No. 9 Virginia Tech x$	7	–	1	11	–	3
Virginia	6	–	2	9	–	4
Georgia Tech	4	–	4	7	–	6
North Carolina	3	–	5	4	–	8
Miami (FL)	2	–	6	5	–	7
Duke	0	–	8	1	–	11
Championship: Virginia Tech 30, Boston College 16
$ – BCS representative as conference champion; % – BCS at-large representative; x – Division champion/co-champions; Rankings from AP Poll

The 2007 Boston College Eagles football team represented Boston College during the 2007 NCAA Division I FBS football season. It was Boston College's third season as a member of the Atlantic Coast Conference (ACC).

The Eagles were led by Jeff Jagodzinski in his first season as head coach. Boston College has been a member of the Atlantic Coast Conference's (ACC) Atlantic Division since joining the league in 2005, after leaving the Big East Conference. The Eagles played their home games in 2007 at Alumni Stadium in Chestnut Hill, Massachusetts, which has been their home stadium since 1957.

== Schedule ==
Date	Time	Opponent	Rank	Site	TV	Result	Attendance
September 1	3:30 p.m.	Wake Forest		Alumni Stadium; Chestnut Hill, MA	ABC	W 38–28	42,292
September 8	2:30 p.m.	NC State		Alumni Stadium; Chestnut Hill, MA	ESPN2	W 37–17	42,513
September 15	8:00 p.m.	at No. 15 Georgia Tech	No. 21	Bobby Dodd Stadium; Atlanta, GA	ESPN2	W 24–10	51,112
September 22	1:00 p.m.	Army*	No. 14	Alumni Stadium; Chestnut Hill, MA	ESPNC	W 37–17	40,329
September 29	1:00 p.m.	UMass*	No. 12	Alumni Stadium; Chestnut Hill, MA (rivalry)		W 24–14	44,111
October 6	12:00 p.m.	Bowling Green*	No. 7	Alumni Stadium; Chestnut Hill, MA	ESPNU	W 55–24	40,117
October 13	3:30 p.m.	at Notre Dame*	No. 4	Notre Dame Stadium; Notre Dame, IN (Holy War)	NBC	W 27–14	80,795
October 25	7:30 p.m.	at No. 8 Virginia Tech	No. 2	Lane Stadium; Blacksburg, VA (rivalry)	ESPN	W 14–10	66,233
November 3	8:00 p.m.	Florida State	No. 2	Alumni Stadium; Chestnut Hill, MA	ABC	L 17–27	40,065
November 10	8:00 p.m.	at Maryland	No. 8	Byrd Stadium; College Park, MD	ABC	L 35–42	52,827
November 17	7:45 p.m.	at No. 15 Clemson	No. 18	Memorial Stadium; Clemson, SC (rivalry)	ESPN	W 20–17	83,472
November 24	12:00 p.m.	Miami	No. 15	Alumni Stadium; Chestnut Hill, MA	ESPN	W 28–14	44,500
December 1	1:00 p.m.	vs. No. 6 Virginia Tech	No. 12	Jacksonville Municipal Stadium; Jacksonville, FL (ACC Championship Game)	ABC	L 16–30	53,212
December 28	5:00 p.m.	vs. Michigan State*	No. 14	Florida Citrus Bowl; Orlando, FL (Champs Sports Bowl)	ESPN	W 24–21	46,554
*Non-conference game; Rankings from AP Poll released prior to the game; All times are in Eastern time

== Rankings ==
Ranking movements Legend: ██ Increase in ranking ██ Decrease in ranking RV = Received votes ( ) = First-place votes
	Week															
Poll	Pre	1	2	3	4	5	6	7	8	9	10	11	12	13	14	Final
AP	RV	RV	21	14	12	7	4	3 (1)	2 (2)	2 (1)	8	18	15	12	14	10
Coaches Poll	RV	25	19	12	11	6	4	2 (1)	2 (2)	2 (3)	8	18	16	12	14	11
Harris	Not released				11	6	4	2	2 (1)	2	8	18	16	12	14	Not released
BCS	Not released							3	2	2	8	17	14	11	14	Not released

== Roster ==
Offense

- QB Matt Ryan
- RB Andre Callender
- RB L. V. Whitworth
- WR Rich Gunnell
- WR Kevin Challenger
- WR Brandon Robinson
- TE Ryan Purvis
- OL Anthony Castonzo
- OL Gosder Cherilus

Defense

- DL Ron Brace
- DL Nick Larkin
- DL/LB Alex Albright
- LB Mark Herzlich
- LB Jolonn Dunbar
- LB/DB Kevin Akins
- DB Jamie Silva
- DB Dejuan Tribble
- DB Paul Anderson

Special Teams

- K Steve Aponavicius
- P Johnny Ayers

== 2008 NFL draft ==
2008	1	3	3	Matt Ryan	Atlanta Falcons	QB
2008	1	17	17	Gosder Cherilus	Detroit Lions	T
2008	6	26	192	DeJuan Tribble	San Diego Chargers	DB
