= 2007 Duke Blue Devils football team =

American college football season

2007 Duke Blue Devils football
- Conference: Atlantic Coast Conference
- Coastal Division
- Record: 1–11 (0–8 ACC)
- Head coach: Ted Roof (4th season)
- Offensive coordinator: Peter Vaas (1st season)
- Offensive scheme: Spread
- Defensive coordinator: Scott Brown (4th season)
- Base defense: Multiple 4–3
- MVP: Eron Riley
- Captains: Patrick Bailey; Chris Davis; Matt Rumsey; Jomar Wright
- Home stadium: Wallace Wade Stadium

2007 Atlantic Coast Conference football standings
	Conf.			Overall
Team	W		L	W		L
Atlantic Division
No. 10 Boston College x	6	–	2	11	–	3
No. 21 Clemson	5	–	3	9	–	4
Wake Forest	5	–	3	9	–	4
Florida State	4	–	4	7	–	6
Maryland	3	–	5	6	–	7
NC State	3	–	5	5	–	7
Coastal Division
No. 9 Virginia Tech x$	7	–	1	11	–	3
Virginia	6	–	2	9	–	4
Georgia Tech	4	–	4	7	–	6
North Carolina	3	–	5	4	–	8
Miami (FL)	2	–	6	5	–	7
Duke	0	–	8	1	–	11
Championship: Virginia Tech 30, Boston College 16
$ – BCS representative as conference champion; % – BCS at-large representative; x – Division champion/co-champions; Rankings from AP Poll

The 2007 Duke Blue Devils football team represented the Duke University in the 2007 NCAA Division I FBS football season. The team was led by head coach Ted Roof. They played their homes games at Wallace Wade Stadium in Durham, North Carolina. The team finished the season with a record of 1–11.

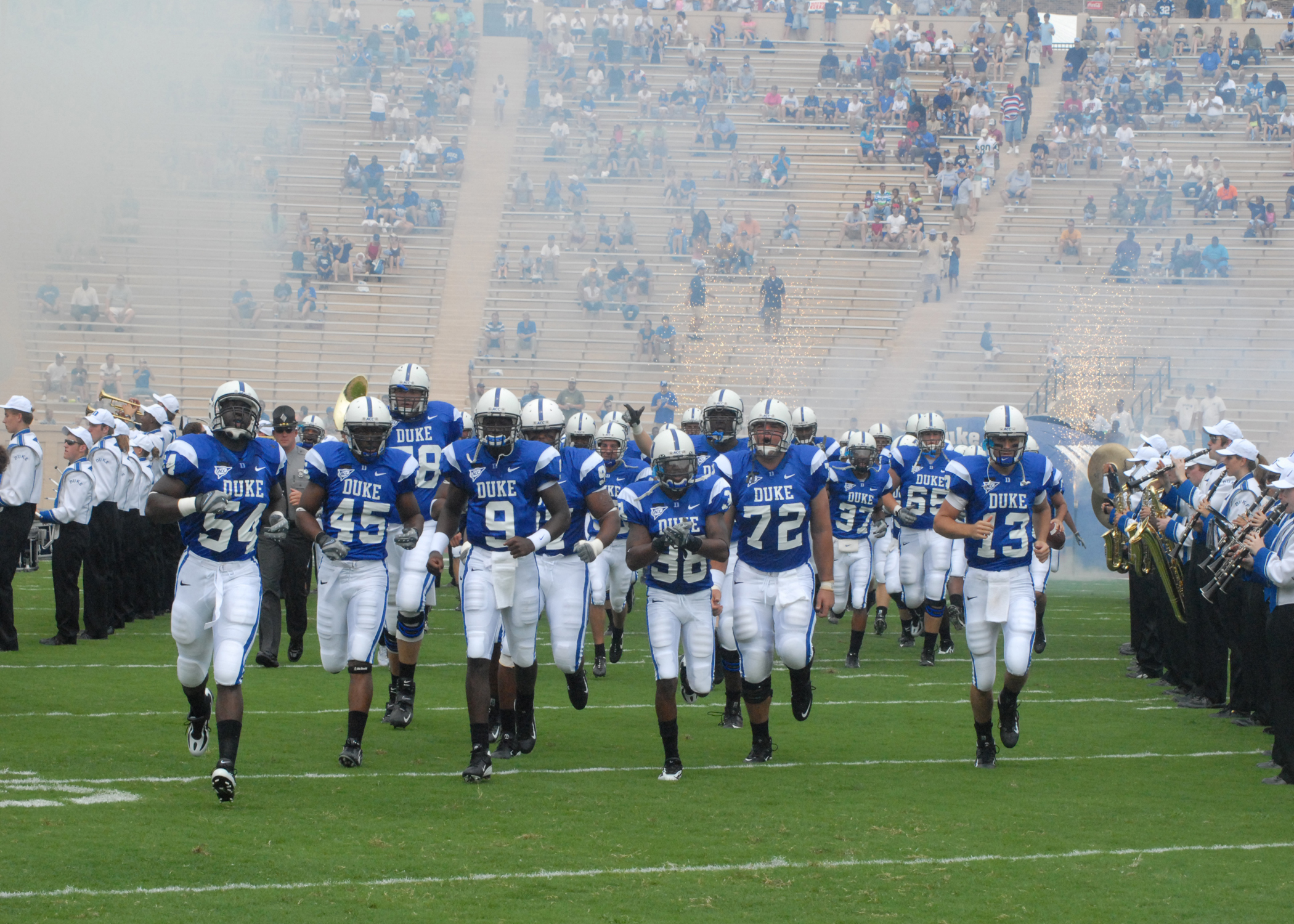
Duke takes the field in their opener against Connecticut

== Schedule ==
Date	Time	Opponent	Site	TV	Result	Attendance
September 1	2:00 pm	Connecticut*	Wallace Wade Stadium; Durham, NC		L 14–45	17,251
September 8	12:00 pm	at Virginia	Scott Stadium; Charlottesville, VA	LFS	L 13–24	58,554
September 15	8:00 pm	at Northwestern*	Ryan Field; Evanston, IL	BTN	W 20–14	23,716
September 22	1:00 pm	at Navy*	Navy–Marine Corps Memorial Stadium; Annapolis, MD	CSTV	L 43–46	31,278
September 29	12:00 pm	at Miami	Orange Bowl; Miami, FL		L 14–24	30,614
October 6	1:00 pm	Wake Forest	Wallace Wade Stadium; Durham, NC (rivalry)	ACCS	L 36–41	20,134
October 13	12:00 pm	No. 12 Virginia Tech^{†}	Wallace Wade Stadium; Durham, NC	LFS	L 14–43	23,691
October 27	8:00 pm	at Florida State	Doak Campbell Stadium; Tallahassee, FL	ESPNU	L 6–25	79,159
November 3	12:00 pm	No. 25 Clemson	Wallace Wade Stadium; Durham, NC	ACCS	L 10–47	20,457
November 10	1:00 pm	Georgia Tech	Wallace Wade Stadium; Durham, NC		L 24–41	18,788
November 17	2:30 pm	at Notre Dame*	Notre Dame Stadium; Notre Dame, IN	NBC	L 7–28	80,795
November 24	3:30 pm	at North Carolina	Kenan Memorial Stadium; Chapel Hill, NC (Victory Bell)	ESPNU	L 14–20 ^{OT}	52,000
*Non-conference game; ^{†}Homecoming; Rankings from AP Poll released prior to the game; All times are in Eastern time
