= 2007 North Carolina Tar Heels football team =

American college football season

2007 North Carolina Tar Heels football
- Conference: Atlantic Coast Conference
- Coastal Division
- Record: 4–8 (3–5 ACC)
- Head coach: Butch Davis (1st season)
- Offensive coordinator: John Shoop (1st season)
- Offensive scheme: Pro-style
- Defensive coordinator: Chuck Pagano (1st season)
- Base defense: 4–3
- Captains: Kentwan Balmer; Connor Barth; Scott Lenahan; Garrett Reynolds; Hilee Taylor
- Home stadium: Kenan Memorial Stadium

2007 Atlantic Coast Conference football standings
	Conf.			Overall
Team	W		L	W		L
Atlantic Division
No. 10 Boston College x	6	–	2	11	–	3
No. 21 Clemson	5	–	3	9	–	4
Wake Forest	5	–	3	9	–	4
Florida State	4	–	4	7	–	6
Maryland	3	–	5	6	–	7
NC State	3	–	5	5	–	7
Coastal Division
No. 9 Virginia Tech x$	7	–	1	11	–	3
Virginia	6	–	2	9	–	4
Georgia Tech	4	–	4	7	–	6
North Carolina	3	–	5	4	–	8
Miami (FL)	2	–	6	5	–	7
Duke	0	–	8	1	–	11
Championship: Virginia Tech 30, Boston College 16
$ – BCS representative as conference champion; % – BCS at-large representative; x – Division champion/co-champions; Rankings from AP Poll

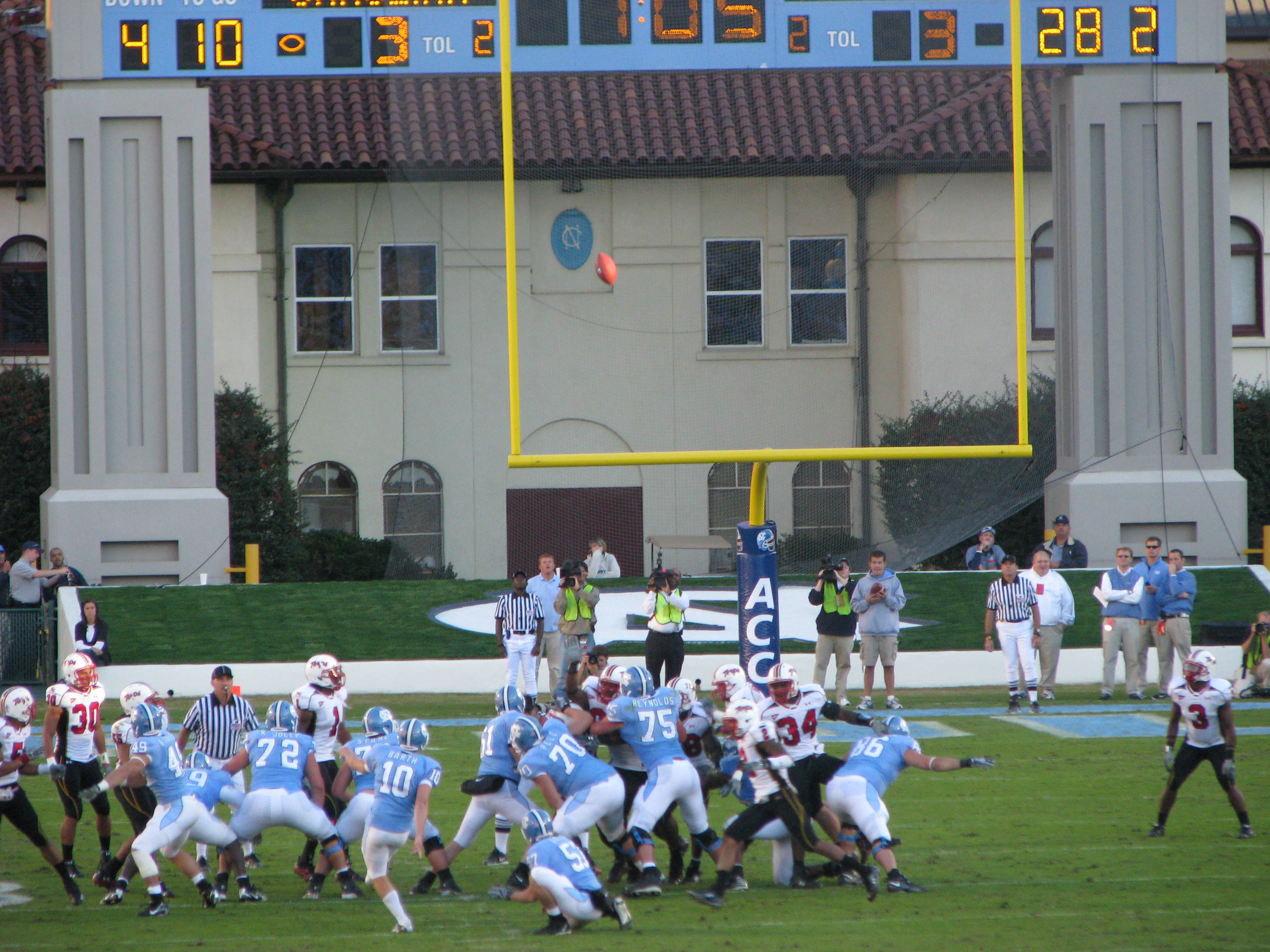
Connor Barth of the North Carolina Tar Heels kicks a field goal in November 2007.

The 2007 North Carolina Tar Heels football team represented the University of North Carolina at Chapel Hill as a member of Coastal Division of the Atlantic Coast Conference (ACC) during the 2007 NCAA Division I FBS football season. Led by first-year head coach Butch Davis, the Tar Heels played their home games at Kenan Memorial Stadium in Chapel Hill, North Carolina. North Carolina finished the season 4–8 overall and 3–5 in ACC play to place fourth in the Coastal Division.

== Preseason ==
Immediately after Bunting's firing on October 22, 2006 there was much speculation over who North Carolina would name their new football coach. Rumors immediately started to circulate that former head coach of the Cleveland Browns and the Miami Hurricanes, Butch Davis, was interested in the position." Athletic director Dick Baddour confirmed the accuracy of the rumors when he announced on November 13, 2006, that Butch Davis had agreed to become the new head football coach." Soon after his hiring, Butch Davis began to assemble his coaching staff. He was able to lure offensive coordinator John Shoop and defensive coordinator Chuck Pagano from the Oakland Raiders of the National Football League (NFL), and defensive line coach John Blake from Nebraska. Blake is regarded by many to be one of the best recruiters in all of college football."

As of March 2007 many publications began releasing preseason rankings for the upcoming football season. Although UNC still ranked in the lower tier of the Atlantic Coast Conference, many publications were impressed with the Tar Heels' hiring of Butch Davis and their top ranked recruiting class."

== Recruiting ==
The Tar Heels received 20 letters of intent on National Signing Day, February 7, 2007. Three student athletes had already enrolled before National Signing Day making this class relatively large with 23 commitments.

College recruiting information
Name	Hometown	School	Height	Weight	40^{‡}	Commit date
Marvin Austin; DT	Washington, DC	Ballou HS	6 ft 2 in (1.88 m)	295 lb (134 kg)	4.68	Feb 7, 2007
Marvin Austin; DT	Recruit ratings: Scout: Rivals: (85)					
Charles Brown; WR	Maple Heights, OH	Maple Heights Senior HS	5 ft 9 in (1.75 m)	190 lb (86 kg)	4.47	Jan 29, 2007
Charles Brown; WR	Recruit ratings: Scout: Rivals: (73)					
Kevin Bryant; OT	Lauderdale Lakes, FL	Boyd H. Anderson HS	6 ft 6 in (1.98 m)	375 lb (170 kg)	5.87	Feb 7, 2007
Kevin Bryant; OT	Recruit ratings: Scout: Rivals: (82)					
Albert Craddock; LB	High Point, NC	Southwest Guilford HS	6 ft 2 in (1.88 m)	205 lb (93 kg)	4.45	Mar 4, 2006
Albert Craddock; LB	Recruit ratings: Scout: Rivals: (75)					
Mike Dykes; OG	Pittsburgh, PA	Woodland Hills HS	6 ft 3 in (1.91 m)	275 lb (125 kg)	5.20	Jan 24, 2007
Mike Dykes; OG	Recruit ratings: Scout: Rivals: (77)					
Linwan Euwell; DE	Tarboro, NC	Southwest Edgecombe HS	6 ft 2 in (1.88 m)	210 lb (95 kg)	4.65	Feb 2, 2007
Linwan Euwell; DE	Recruit ratings: Scout: Rivals: (78)					
LaCount Fantroy; CB	New Berlin, NY	Milford Academy	5 ft 11 in (1.80 m)	170 lb (77 kg)	4.50	Jun 17, 2005
LaCount Fantroy; CB	Recruit ratings: Scout: Rivals: (40)					
Carl Gaskins; OT	Melbourne, FL	Palm Bay Senior HS	6 ft 5 in (1.96 m)	255 lb (116 kg)	NA	Feb 4, 2007
Carl Gaskins; OT	Recruit ratings: Scout: Rivals: (40)					
Brian Gupton; WR	Nashville, TN	Pearl-Cohn HS	6 ft 3 in (1.91 m)	185 lb (84 kg)	4.50	Feb 4, 2007
Brian Gupton; WR	Recruit ratings: Scout: Rivals: (40)					
Cameron Holland; OG	Pittsburgh, PA	Perry Traditional Academy	6 ft 2 in (1.88 m)	280 lb (130 kg)	4.95	Jan 24, 2007
Cameron Holland; OG	Recruit ratings: Scout: Rivals: (72)					
Ryan Houston; RB	Matthews, NC	David W Butler HS	6 ft 2 in (1.88 m)	245 lb (111 kg)	4.58	Jan 21, 2007
Ryan Houston; RB	Recruit ratings: Scout: Rivals: (79)					
Dwight Jones; WR	Burlington, NC	Hugh M Cummings HS	6 ft 5 in (1.96 m)	210 lb (95 kg)	4.61	Feb 7, 2007
Dwight Jones; WR	Recruit ratings: Scout: Rivals: (81)					
Greg Little; WR	Durham, NC	Hillside HS	6 ft 3 in (1.91 m)	215 lb (98 kg)	4.55	Feb 7, 2007
Greg Little; WR	Recruit ratings: Scout: Rivals: (84)					
Rashad Mason; WR	Nashville, TN	Pearl-Cohn HS	6 ft 6 in (1.98 m)	215 lb (98 kg)	4.50	Feb 4, 2007
Rashad Mason; WR	Recruit ratings: Scout: Rivals: (40)					
Matt Merletti; CB	Cleveland, OH	St. Ignatius HS	5 ft 11 in (1.80 m)	185 lb (84 kg)	4.48	Dec 12, 2006
Matt Merletti; CB	Recruit ratings: Scout: Rivals: (40)					
Mike Paulus; QB	Syracuse, NY	Christian Brothers Academy	6 ft 5 in (1.96 m)	220 lb (100 kg)	4.90	Apr 28, 2006
Mike Paulus; QB	Recruit ratings: Scout: Rivals: (79)					
Zach Pianalto; TE	Springdale, AR	Springdale HS	6 ft 4 in (1.93 m)	220 lb (100 kg)	4.63	Jan 2, 2007
Zach Pianalto; TE	Recruit ratings: Scout: Rivals: (78)					
Tydreke Powell; DT	Ahoskie, NC	Hertford County HS	6 ft 3 in (1.91 m)	295 lb (134 kg)	4.90	Jan 21, 2007
Tydreke Powell; DT	Recruit ratings: Scout: Rivals: (81)					
Devon Ramsay; RB	Red Bank, NJ	Lawrenceville Prep	6 ft 2 in (1.88 m)	242 lb (110 kg)	4.60	Jan 7, 2007
Devon Ramsay; RB	Recruit ratings: Scout: Rivals: (68)					
Da'Norris Searcy; LB	Decatur, GA	Towers HS	6 ft 0 in (1.83 m)	195 lb (88 kg)	4.50	Dec 10, 2006
Da'Norris Searcy; LB	Recruit ratings: Scout: Rivals: (40)					
Jonathan Smith; LB	Durham, NC	Hillside HS	6 ft 2 in (1.88 m)	190 lb (86 kg)	4.6	Apr 11, 2006
Jonathan Smith; LB	Recruit ratings: Scout: Rivals: (78)					
Quantavius Sturdivant; LB	Oakboro, NC	West Stanly HS	6 ft 3 in (1.91 m)	227 lb (103 kg)	4.55	Nov 16, 2006
Quantavius Sturdivant; LB	Recruit ratings: Scout: Rivals: (79)					
Jay Wooten; K	Laurinburg, NC	Scotland HS	6 ft 3 in (1.91 m)	180 lb (82 kg)	4.8	May 19, 2006
Jay Wooten; K	Recruit ratings: Scout: Rivals: (73)					
Overall recruit ranking: Scout: 15 Rivals: 16
‡ Refers to 40-yard dash; Note: In many cases, Scout, Rivals, 247Sports, On3, and ESPN may conflict in their listings of height, weight and 40 time.; In these cases, the average was taken. ESPN grades are on a 100-point scale.; Sources: "2007 Team Ranking". Rivals.com.

== Coaching staff ==
Name	Position	Seasons in Position
Butch Davis	Head coach	1st
John Blake	Associate head coach / recruiting coordinator / defensive line	1st
Ken Browning	Running backs	14th
Jeff Connors	Strength and conditioning coordinator	7th
Steve Hagen	Tight Ends	1st
John Lovett	Special teams coordinator / Defensive Assistant	1st
Chuck Pagano	Defensive coordinator / defensive backs	1st
Sam Pittman	Offensive Line	1st
John Shoop	Offensive coordinator / quarterbacks	1st
Tommy Thigpen	Linebackers	3rd
Charlie Williams	Wide Receivers	1st

== Schedule ==
Date	Time	Opponent	Site	TV	Result	Attendance
September 1	6:00 p.m.	No. 8 (FCS) James Madison*	Kenan Memorial Stadium; Chapel Hill, NC	ESPN360	W 37–14	58,500
September 8	6:00 p.m.	at East Carolina*	Dowdy–Ficklen Stadium; Greenville, NC	CSTV	L 31–34	43,387
September 15	12:00 p.m.	Virginia	Kenan Memorial Stadium; Chapel Hill, NC (South's Oldest Rivalry)	Raycom, LFS	L 20–22	58,000
September 22	12:00 p.m.	at No. 23 South Florida*	Raymond James Stadium; Tampa, FL	ESPN	L 10–37	37,693
September 29	12:00 p.m.	at No. 17 Virginia Tech	Lane Stadium; Blacksburg, VA	Raycom/LFS	L 10–17	66,233
October 6	12:00 p.m.	Miami (FL)	Kenan Memorial Stadium; Chapel Hill, NC	ESPN2	W 33–27	59,000
October 13	3:30 p.m.	No. 7 South Carolina*	Kenan Memorial Stadium; Chapel Hill, NC	ABC	L 15–21	61,000
October 27	12:00 p.m.	at Wake Forest	BB&T Field; Winston-Salem, NC (rivalry)	Raycom/LFS	L 10–37	33,023
November 3	3:45 p.m.	Maryland^{†}	Kenan Memorial Stadium; Chapel Hill, NC	ESPNU	W 16–13	56,000
November 10	12:00 p.m.	at NC State	Carter–Finley Stadium; Raleigh, NC (rivalry)	Raycom/LFS	L 27–31	57,583
November 17	12:00 p.m.	at Georgia Tech	Bobby Dodd Stadium; Atlanta, GA	Raycom/LFS	L 25–27	45,490
November 24	3:30 p.m.	Duke	Kenan Memorial Stadium; Chapel Hill, NC (Victory Bell)	ESPNU	W 20–14 ^{OT}	52,000
*Non-conference game; ^{†}Homecoming; Rankings from AP Poll released prior to the game; All times are in Eastern time

== Team statistics ==
Passing Leader	Cmp	Att	Yds	TD	Int
T. J. Yates	218	365	2655	14	18

Rushing Leaders	Car	Yds	Long	TD
Johnny White	95	399	39	0
Anthony Elzy	92	321	39	5
Greg Little	59	300	38	2
Ryan Houston	44	145	10	1
Brandon Tate	12	131	54	1

Receiving Leaders	Rec	Yds	Long	TD
Hakeem Nicks	74	958	53	5
Brandon Tate	25	479	51	5
Brooks Foster	29	417	65	2

Kicking	XPM	XPA	FGM	FGM	Long	Pts
Connor Barth	21	23	19	22	51	78
