= 2007 Georgia Tech Yellow Jackets football team =

American college football season

2007 Georgia Tech Yellow Jackets football

Humanitarian Bowl, L 28–40 vs. Fresno State
- Conference: Atlantic Coast Conference
- Coastal
- Record: 7–6 (4–4 ACC)
- Head coach: Chan Gailey (6th season; regular season); Jon Tenuta (interim; bowl game)
- Offensive coordinator: John Bond (1st season)
- Offensive scheme: Mixed Shotgun & Ace
- Defensive coordinator: Jon Tenuta (6th season)
- Base defense: Zone Blitz
- Home stadium: Bobby Dodd Stadium

2007 Atlantic Coast Conference football standings
	Conf.			Overall
Team	W		L	W		L
Atlantic Division
No. 10 Boston College x	6	–	2	11	–	3
No. 21 Clemson	5	–	3	9	–	4
Wake Forest	5	–	3	9	–	4
Florida State	4	–	4	7	–	6
Maryland	3	–	5	6	–	7
NC State	3	–	5	5	–	7
Coastal Division
No. 9 Virginia Tech x$	7	–	1	11	–	3
Virginia	6	–	2	9	–	4
Georgia Tech	4	–	4	7	–	6
North Carolina	3	–	5	4	–	8
Miami (FL)	2	–	6	5	–	7
Duke	0	–	8	1	–	11
Championship: Virginia Tech 30, Boston College 16
$ – BCS representative as conference champion; % – BCS at-large representative; x – Division champion/co-champions; Rankings from AP Poll

The 2007 Georgia Tech Yellow Jackets football team represented the Georgia Institute of Technology in the 2007 NCAA Division I FBS football season. The team's coach was former Dallas Cowboys, Samford Bulldogs, and Troy Trojans coach Chan Gailey. It played its home games at Bobby Dodd Stadium in Atlanta.

== Preseason ==
Head coach Chan Gailey returned for his sixth year at the helm of the program. Reggie Ball, after four years starting for Tech, was replaced by Taylor Bennett. Taylor Bennett started his first game against UConn in 2005 after Reggie came down with viral meningitis and had his break out game against West Virginia in the 2007 Gator Bowl. Tashard Choice was the 2006 ACC rushing champion and returned behind a veteran offensive line led by tackle Andrew Gardner and center Kevin Tuminello. Georgia Tech was ranked as high as #14 in the preseason.

== Schedule ==
Date	Time	Opponent	Rank	Site	TV	Result	Attendance	Source
September 1	3:30 pm	at Notre Dame*		Notre Dame Stadium; Notre Dame, IN (rivalry)	NBC	W 33–3	80,795	
September 8	1:30 pm	Samford*	No. 21	Bobby Dodd Stadium; Atlanta, GA	ESPNU	W 69–14	43,288	
September 15	8:00 pm	No. 21 Boston College	No. 15	Bobby Dodd Stadium; Atlanta, GA	ESPN2	L 10–24	51,112	
September 22	12:00 pm	at Virginia		Scott Stadium; Charlottesville, VA	ESPNU	L 23–28	57,681	
September 29	3:30 pm	No. 13 Clemson		Bobby Dodd Stadium; Atlanta, GA (rivalry)	ABC	W 13–3	54,635	
October 6	12:00 pm	at Maryland		Byrd Stadium; College Park, MD	LFS	L 26–28	47,527	
October 13	12:00 pm	at Miami		Miami Orange Bowl; Miami, FL	ESPN	W 17–14	52,416	
October 20	12:00 pm	Army*^{†}		Bobby Dodd Stadium; Atlanta, GA	LFS	W 34–10	50,242	
November 1	7:30 pm	No. 11 Virginia Tech		Bobby Dodd Stadium; Atlanta, GA	ESPN	L 3–27	52,202	
November 10	1:00 pm	at Duke		Wallace Wade Stadium; Durham, NC		W 41–24	18,788	
November 17	12:00 pm	North Carolina		Bobby Dodd Stadium; Atlanta, GA	LFS	W 27–25	45,490	
November 24	3:30 pm	No. 6 Georgia*		Bobby Dodd Stadium; Atlanta, GA (Clean, Old-Fashioned Hate)	ABC	L 17–31	54,990	
December 31	2:00 pm	vs. Fresno State*		Bronco Stadium; Boise, ID (Humanitarian Bowl)	ESPN2	L 28–40	27,062	
*Non-conference game; ^{†}Homecoming; Rankings from AP Poll released prior to the game; All times are in Eastern time

== Game summaries ==
=== Notre Dame ===
Uniform Combination
Helmet	Jersey	Pants

	1	2	3	4	Total
Yellow Jackets	6	10	3	14	33
Fighting Irish	0	0	3	0	3

Running Back Tashard Choice ran for a career-high 196 yards for 2 touchdowns in the worst loss suffered by Notre Dame in a season opener in its history. Notre Dame accumulated −9 rushing yards and 130 passing yards. Georgia Tech amassed 260 yards on the ground while Taylor Bennett went 11/23 for 121 yards for his third career start. The Georgia Tech defense added nine quarterback sacks and recovered three fumbles.

=== Samford ===
Uniform Combination
Helmet	Jersey	Pants

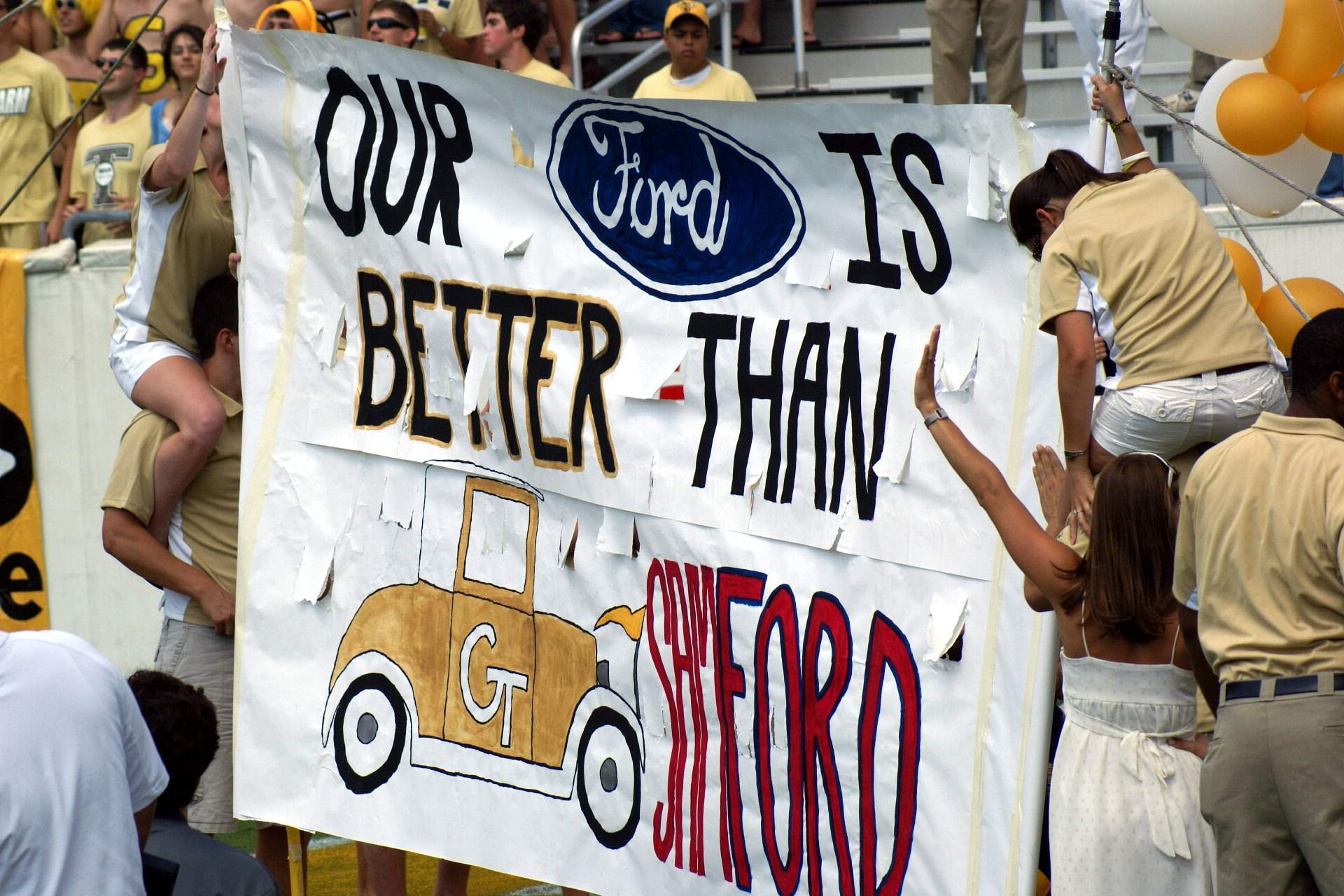
Our Ford is better than Samford.

	1	2	3	4	Total
Bulldogs	0	0	7	7	14
#21 Yellow Jackets	28	17	17	7	69

Georgia Tech scored 9 rushing touchdowns in an offensive exhibition that also featured 389 yards of rushing yards. Tashard Choice continued his 100 yards per game streak with a 110 yard, 2 touchdown effort. True freshman Jon Dwyer racked up 3 rushing touchdowns as well. The Tech defense held Samford to 84 yards rushing and recovered two fumbles.

=== Boston College ===
	1	2	3	4	Total
#19 Eagles	7	7	7	3	24
#15 Yellow Jackets	0	0	0	10	10

Georgia Tech hosted Boston College for the first time since 1998, and it was also the first meeting of the two schools since Boston College joined the ACC. Senior BC quarterback Matt Ryan threw for a career-high 435 yards and the Eagles outgained the Jackets 527–267 in the game. Tech's defense held BC to 93 yards rushing, recovered a fumble, and attained two sacks. Offensive highlights included Jon Dwyer's fifth career touchdown and Demaryius Thomas reeling in 5 catches for 68 yards. Durant Brooks boomed 10 punts for a 45.3 yard average as well. The loss was Tech's first of the year, dropping them to 2–1, and 0–1 in the ACC.

=== Virginia ===
	1	2	3	4	Total
Yellow Jackets	7	10	6	0	23
Cavaliers	21	0	0	7	28

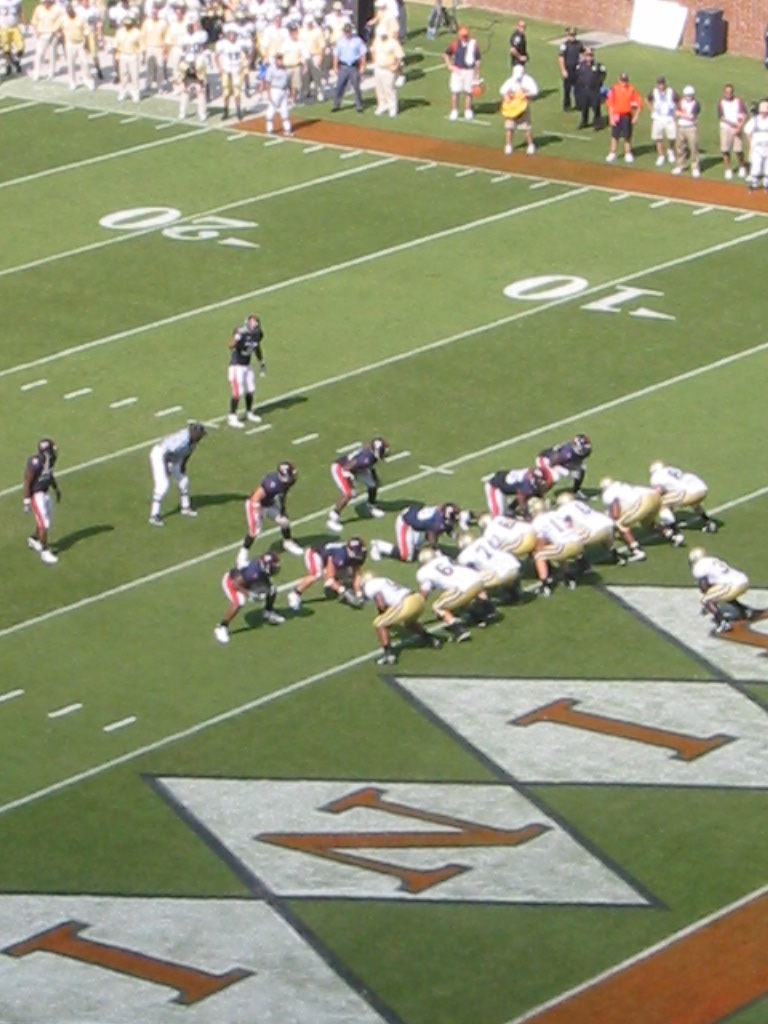
Georgia Tech lines up in their own endzone

Tech lost its eighth straight road trip in Charlottesville. The Jackets gave up 21 points in the first thirteen minutes of the game. UVA scored two rushing touchdowns and on a Chris Long pass deflection that Taylor Bennett attempted to knock down. After Bennett attempted to knockdown the pass it was picked off by a UVA linebacker and returned for a touchdown. Georgia Tech answered back scoring 16 unanswered points to take the lead 23–21 late in the third quarter. After a muffed punt with nine minutes remaining in the game, UVA took the lead with a touchdown pass, which would be the last score of the game. Georgia Tech wide receiver Corey Earls suffered a severe nick injury late in the fourth quarter after a Taylor Bennett scramble. Tech was led by Jon Dwyer's 83 yards rushing and Demaryius Thomas' 86 receiving yards and a touchdown. Tech's defense recovered two fumbles, garnered two sacks, and intercepted one pass. Safety Jamal Lewis led the team with 12 tackles and a tackle for a loss.

=== Clemson ===
	1	2	3	4	Total
#13 Tigers	3	0	0	0	3
Yellow Jackets	7	0	3	3	13

The Yellow Jackets got their first conference win against rival Clemson. The Tigers averaged 38 points a game leading up to the contest but only managed a field goal. The Tech defense held C. J. Spiller and James Davis to a combined 62 yards on 21 attempts. The Tech defense also accumulated 6 sacks and an interception in their effort. Tech's Travis Bell kicked two field goals while Clemson's Mark Buchholz missed four of his five attempted field goals. Georgia Tech's offense controlled the clock with a ferocious ground attack, which featured Tashard Choice's 142 rushing yards and a touchdown. Clemson has not scored a touchdown in Bobby Dodd Stadium since 2003. Tech will be on the road for the next two weeks before returning to Atlanta to play the Army Black Knights for the annual homecoming celebration.

=== Maryland ===
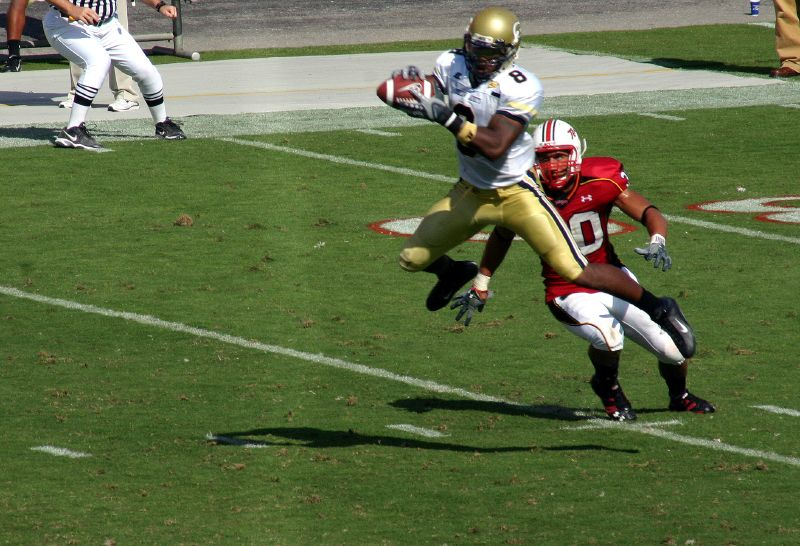
Demaryius Thomas catches a pass during the Maryland game

	1	2	3	4	Total
Yellow Jackets	3	7	7	9	26
Terrapins	14	7	7	0	28

Placekicker Travis Bell missed two of four field goal attempts including a 52 yarder on Tech's last possession in a 28–26 loss to Maryland. Maryland stormed ahead of Tech taking a 21–3 lead by the beginning of the second quarter. Tech rallied and by the fourth quarter had closed the gap to 2 points on a Taylor Bennett to Demaryius Thomas touchdown pass. The two-point conversion attempt failed and Tech would not score again. Tech was led by the rushing of Tashard Choice who carried 32 times for 135 yards and Demaryius Thomas' 9 receptions and 139 yards. Tech's defense amassed four sacks and recovered a fumble.

=== Miami (FL) ===
	1	2	3	4	Total
Yellow Jackets	0	0	14	3	17
Hurricanes	7	0	0	7	14

Taylor Bennett scored on two rushing touchdowns in the third quarter to lead Tech past the Hurricanes 17–14. Tech racked up 265 yards rushing against a Canes defense that only allowed 111 rushing yards per game coming into the contest. Tashard Choice carried the bulk of the rushing load carrying the ball 37 times for 204 yards. The Patrick Nix offense of Miami only passed for 56 yards and gained 225 total yards of offense against Jon Tenuta's defense. Travis Bell kicked the go-ahead field goal with 7:34 left in the fourth quarter and Tech never relented the lead. Since 1984, only Tech, Virginia Tech, and Florida State have beaten Miami at least 3 years in a row.

=== Army ===
	1	2	3	4	Total
Black Knights	7	3	0	0	10
Yellow Jackets	10	3	14	7	34

Tech beat Army 34–10 at the cost of two running backs. Tashard Choice and Rashaun Grant were both injured in the contest during Tech's 292-rushing-yard game. Tech's offense was led by Rashaun Grant's 135 all-purpose yardage and a touchdown. Tashard Choice, Jamaal Evans, and Jon Dwyer also scored rushing touchdowns. Mike Cox rushed for a career 38 yards on 3 carries. Freshman safety Morgan Burnett picked off his third pass of the season, which stymied Army's last attempt at taking the lead for the rest of the game. Tech's defense recorded 3 total interceptions and 2 sacks. Senior defensive end Darryl Robertson recorded 4 tackles for losses and a sack in the effort. Tech was now one victory away from bowl eligibility.

=== Virginia Tech ===
	1	2	3	4	Total
#13 Hokies	3	14	7	3	27
Yellow Jackets	3	0	0	0	3

Georgia Tech only mustered a field goal in a game that saw Tech's offense turn the ball over 6 times. Taylor Bennett threw 4 interceptions and was sacked twice in the effort while freshman quarterback Josh Nesbitt threw another interception in the fourth quarter. James Johnson accounted for another turnover when he fumbled after a 35 yard reception. The Tech defense brought pressure all game long and sacked Virginia Tech quarterback Sean Glennon seven times and stripped runningback Branden Ore of the football once in the effort. James Johnson had 7 receptions for a 136 yards while freshmen Jon Dwyer and Josh Nesbitt carried the load for injured seniors Tashard Choice and Rashaun Grant. The freshmen pair ran for 101 yards on 14 carries. Durant Brooks pinned the Hokies inside the twenty 4 times out of 6 punts. Tech is now eliminated from ACC Title contention. Also of note, Big Boi of Outkast performed at half-time.

=== Duke ===
	1	2	3	4	Total
Yellow Jackets	10	17	7	7	41
Blue Devils	10	7	7	0	24

Georgia Tech prevailed after trailing the Blue Devils 10–7 in the first quarter. The Tech defense recovered a fumble and recorded eight sacks in the effort. Tashard Choice eclipsed the 1,000 yard mark for the second straight season with his two touchdown, 174 yard effort. Tech, with the win, became the 8th bowl eligible team in the ACC and ensured that Georgia Tech's 11 year bowl streak would continue to twelve years.

=== North Carolina ===
	1	2	3	4	Total
Tar Heels	3	3	3	16	25
Yellow Jackets	7	3	7	10	27

View from the south student section.

Georgia Tech survived four lost fumbles to overcome a late UNC rally and win 27–25. Travis Bell connected on two of three field goal attempts, which included Tech's winning score with 11 seconds remaining in the game. Taylor Bennett passed for 196 yards, threw for a touchdown, and caught a touchdown pass from Tashard Choice. Choice added 127 yards on the ground. The Tech defense added four sacks to the effort led by Gary Guyton who accounted for 8 solo tackles and three tackles for loss. Durant Brooks punted the ball 4 times for 240 total yards including a booming 76 yard punt. Tech's 4–4 ACC mark helps Tech finish the season third in the ACC Coastal division and tied for fifth with Wake Forest for fifth overall in the conference.

=== Georgia ===
	1	2	3	4	Total
#7 Bulldogs	3	13	7	8	31
Yellow Jackets	0	14	0	3	17

Tech dropped its seventh straight season finale to UGA with a 31–17 loss. Tech's defense picked up one sack in the effort. Tech's offense was led by Tashard Choice's 133 yards and a touchdown. Durant Brooks boomed four punts for a 52.8 yard average while placekicker Travis Bell knocked down a field goal in the fourth quarter for Tech's last points of the game.

=== Humanitarian Bowl ===
	1	2	3	4	Total
Yellow Jackets	7	0	14	7	28
Bulldogs	3	17	14	6	40

Tech was coached by interim head coach Jon Tenuta as head coach Chan Gailey was terminated the Monday after the UGA loss. Tech dropped the decision 40–28. Tech's only lead of 7–0 held until the Bulldogs scored 27 straight unanswered points. Tech never recuperated from the 17 point Fresno 2nd quarter as Tech and Fresno exchanged touchdowns for the rest of the game. Tech highlights included Jon Dwyer rushing for two touchdowns and Demaryius Thomas catching 4 passes for 69 yards and a touchdown. Tech receiver D.J. Donley blocked his second punt of the year as well.

== Postseason awards ==
Associated Press All-America Team
Second Team	Third Team
Durant Brooks, P	Vance Walker, DT
Associated Press All-ACC Team
First Team	Second Team
Travis Bell, K; Durant Brooks, P; Tashard Choice, RB; Andrew Gardner, OT; Vance Walker, DT	Darrell Robertson, DE; Kevin Tuminello, C; Philip Wheeler, LB
Ray Guy Award
Durant Brooks, P

== Roster ==
(as of 3/28/2007); list is subject to change.
Wide receivers: 5 Greg Smith – RS Sophomore; 8 Demaryius Thomas – RS Freshman; 15 Correy Earls – RS Freshman; 24 Jonathan Malone – Sophomore; 25 Miles King – Sophomore; 28 D.J. Donley – Incoming Freshman; 83 Andrew Smith – RS Junior; 86 Tyler Davis – RS Junior; 88 Willie White – Freshman; 89 James Johnson – RS Junior; Tyler Melton – Incoming Freshman; Offensive line: 53 A.J. Smith – RS Junior; 55 David Brown – RS Junior; 60 Kevin Tuminello – RS Senior; 61 Matt Rhodes – RS Senior; 62 Jacob Lonowski – RS Junior; 63 Zach Krish – RS Freshman; 64 Andrew Gardner – RS Junior; 65 Andrew Folkner – RS Junior; 67 Will Minter – RS Sophomore; 68 Drew Brannon – RS Freshman; 70 Joseph Gilbert – Freshman; 71 Cord Howard – RS Sophomore; 73 Nate McManus – Senior; 74 Trey Dunmon – RS Sophomore; 75 Jason Hill – RS Sophomore; 76 Nick Claytor – Freshman; 77 Dan Voss – RS Sophomore; 78 Clyde Yandell – Incoming Freshman; Tight ends: 81 Brad Sellers – RS Sophomore; 82 Jeff Lentz – RS Freshman; 84 Colin Peek – RS Sophomore; 85 Austin Barrick – RS Freshman	Quarterbacks: 9 Josh Nesbitt – Incoming Freshman; 11 Kyle Manley – RS Junior; 13 Taylor Bennett – RS Junior; 14 Byron Ingram – RS Freshman; 18 Calvin Booker – RS Junior; Running backs: 3 Rashaun Grant – RS Senior; 20 Jamaal Evans – Sophomore; 21 Jonathan Dwyer – Incoming Freshman; 22 Tashard Choice – RS Senior; 27 Loyall Gause – RS Junior; 29 Roddy Jones – Incoming Freshman; 43 Tyler Evans – Sophomore; 45 Jason Davis – RS Sophomore; Fullbacks: 38 Quincy Kelly – RS Freshman; 40 Mike Cox – Senior; 46 Matt Kamp – RS Sophomore; 49 Trevor Bray – RS Freshman; Defensive line: 42 Adamm Oliver – RS Senior; 63 Marcus Harris – RS Senior; 69 Alex Paquette – RS Sophomore; 76 Sam Pitts – RS Junior; 79 Sean Bedford – RS Freshman; 90 Darell Robertson – Senior; 91 Derrick Morgan – Freshman; 92 Jason Peters – Freshman; 93 Michael Johnson – Junior; 94 Elris Anyaibe – RS Junior; 95 Darryl Richard – RS Junior; 96 Logan Walls – Freshman; 97 Robert Hall – Sophomore; 98 Ben Anderson – RS Freshman; 99 Vance Walker – Junior	Linebackers: 7 Tony Clark – Junior; 12 Anthony Barnes – RS Freshman; 17 Matt Braman – Junior; 30 James Liipfert – RS Junior; 41 Philip Wheeler – RS Senior; 43 Luke Snider – RS Freshman; 50 Steven Powers – RS Freshman; 50 Albert Rocker – Incoming Freshman; 51 Carter Scurry – RS Sophomore; 51 Brad Jefferson – Incoming Freshman; 52 Travis Chambers – RS Junior; 54 Sedric Griffin – Sophomore; 56 Osahon Tongo – RS Freshman; 57 Shane Bowen – Sophomore; 58 Gary Guyton – Senior; 59 David Sanborn – RS Senior; 59 Kyle Jackson – Incoming Freshman; Defensive backs: 1 Morgan Burnett – Freshman; 2 Mario Butler – Freshman; 4 Jamal Lewis – Senior; 6 Pat Clark – Senior; 10 Martin Frierson – RS Sophomore; 23 Djay Jones – Senior; 25 DeRon Jasper – RS Freshman; 26 Dominique Reese – RS Freshman; 32 Jahi Word-Daniels – Junior; 34 Avery Roberson – RS Senior; 35 Michael Peterson – Incoming Freshman; 36 Shelden Little – Freshmen; 37 Joe Gaston – RS Senior; 39 Josh Warren – RS Freshman; 47 Jake Blackwood – RS Sophomore; 48 Jerrard Tarrant – Incoming Freshman; Long snappers: 50 Brett White – RS Junior; 72 Zach Ware – RS Sophomore; Punters: 12 Kevin Crosby – RS Freshman; 39 Durant Brooks – RS Senior; Kickers: 17 Iain Vance – RS Freshman; 31 Mohamed Yahiaoui – Junior; 33 Troy Garside – RS Junior; 87 Travis Bell – RS Senior; 14 Scott Blair – Incoming Freshman; 33 Tyler Dale – Incoming Freshman

== Coaching staff ==
- Chan Gailey – Head coach until fired on November 26, 2007
- John Bond – Offensive Coordinator/Quarterbacks
- Joe D'Alessandris – Offensive Line
- Buddy geis – Wide Receivers/Assistant Head Coach
- Jeep hunter – Tight Ends
- Brian jean-mary – Linebackers
- Charles kelly – Special Teams Coordinator
- Curtis modkins – Running Backs
- Giff smith – Defensive Line/Recruiting Coordinator
- Jon Tenuta – Assistant Head Coach/Defensive Coordinator
- Butch brooks – Director of Football Operations
- Liam klein – Director of Player Personnel
