= 2007 Maryland Terrapins football team =

American college football season

2007 Maryland Terrapins football
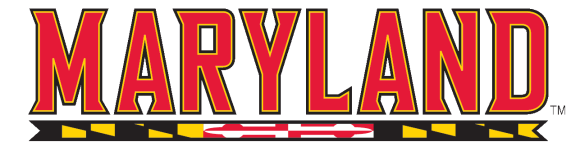

Emerald Bowl, L 14–21 vs. Oregon State
- Conference: Atlantic Coast Conference
- Atlantic Division
- Record: 6–7 (3–5 ACC)
- Head coach: Ralph Friedgen (7th season)
- Offensive scheme: Pro-style
- Defensive coordinator: Chris Cosh (2nd season)
- Base defense: 4–3
- Home stadium: Byrd Stadium

2007 Atlantic Coast Conference football standings
	Conf.			Overall
Team	W		L	W		L
Atlantic Division
No. 10 Boston College x	6	–	2	11	–	3
No. 21 Clemson	5	–	3	9	–	4
Wake Forest	5	–	3	9	–	4
Florida State	4	–	4	7	–	6
Maryland	3	–	5	6	–	7
NC State	3	–	5	5	–	7
Coastal Division
No. 9 Virginia Tech x$	7	–	1	11	–	3
Virginia	6	–	2	9	–	4
Georgia Tech	4	–	4	7	–	6
North Carolina	3	–	5	4	–	8
Miami (FL)	2	–	6	5	–	7
Duke	0	–	8	1	–	11
Championship: Virginia Tech 30, Boston College 16
$ – BCS representative as conference champion; % – BCS at-large representative; x – Division champion/co-champions; Rankings from AP Poll

The 2007 Maryland Terrapins football team represented the University of Maryland in the 2007 NCAA Division I FBS football season. It was the Terrapins' 55th season as a member of the Atlantic Coast Conference (ACC) and its third within the ACC's Atlantic Division. Ralph Friedgen led the team for his seventh season as head coach, and also performed the duties of offensive coordinator. Chris Cosh served for the second season as the team's defensive coordinator. Maryland lost three close games, but gained bowl eligibility with six wins. In the postseason, the Terrapins lost to Oregon State in the 2007 Emerald Bowl.

== Schedule ==
Date	Time	Opponent	Site	TV	Result	Attendance	Source
September 1	6:00 pm	Villanova*	Byrd Stadium; College Park, MD	ESPN360	W 31–14	50,389	
September 8	7:00 pm	at FIU*	Miami Orange Bowl; Miami, FL	ESPNU	W 26–10	12,201	
September 13	7:30 pm	No. 4 West Virginia*	Byrd Stadium; College Park, MD (rivalry)	ESPN	L 14–31	53,107	
September 22	3:30 pm	at Wake Forest	BB&T Field; Winston-Salem, NC	ESPNU	L 24–31	31,964	
September 29	3:30 pm	at No. 10 Rutgers*	Rutgers Stadium; Piscataway, NJ	ABC	W 34–24	43,803	
October 6	12:00 pm	Georgia Tech	Byrd Stadium; College Park, MD	Raycom/LFS	W 28–26	47,527	
October 20	8:00 pm	Virginia^{†}	Byrd Stadium; College Park, MD (rivalry)	ESPN2	L 17–18	52,782	
October 27	3:30 pm	Clemson	Byrd Stadium; College Park, MD	ABC	L 17–30	50,948	
November 3	3:45 pm	at North Carolina	Kenan Memorial Stadium; Chapel Hill, NC	ESPNU	L 13–16	56,000	
November 10	8:00 pm	No. 8 Boston College	Byrd Stadium; College Park, MD	ABC	W 42–35	52,827	
November 17	12:00 pm	at Florida State	Doak Campbell Stadium; Tallahassee, FL	Raycom/LFS	L 16–24	80,213	
November 24	12:00 pm	at NC State	Carter–Finley Stadium; Raleigh, NC	Raycom/LFS	W 37–0	54,856	
December 28	8:30 pm	vs. Oregon State*	AT&T Park; San Francisco, CA (Emerald Bowl)	ESPN	L 14–21	32,517	
*Non-conference game; ^{†}Homecoming; Rankings from AP Poll released prior to the game; All times are in Eastern time

== Coaching staff ==
Name	Position	Year at Maryland	Alma mater (Year)
Ralph Friedgen	Head coach/offensive coordinator	7th	Maryland (1970)
Chris Cosh	Defensive coordinator/inside linebackers	2nd	Virginia Tech (1983)
Bryan Bossard	Assistant coach – Wide receivers	3rd	Delaware (1989)
Tom Brattan	Assistant coach – Offensive line	7th	Delaware (1972)
John Donovan	Assistant coach – Quarterbacks	7th	Johns Hopkins (1997)
Kevin Lempa	Assistant coach – Secondary	1st	Southern Connecticut State (1974)

== Roster ==
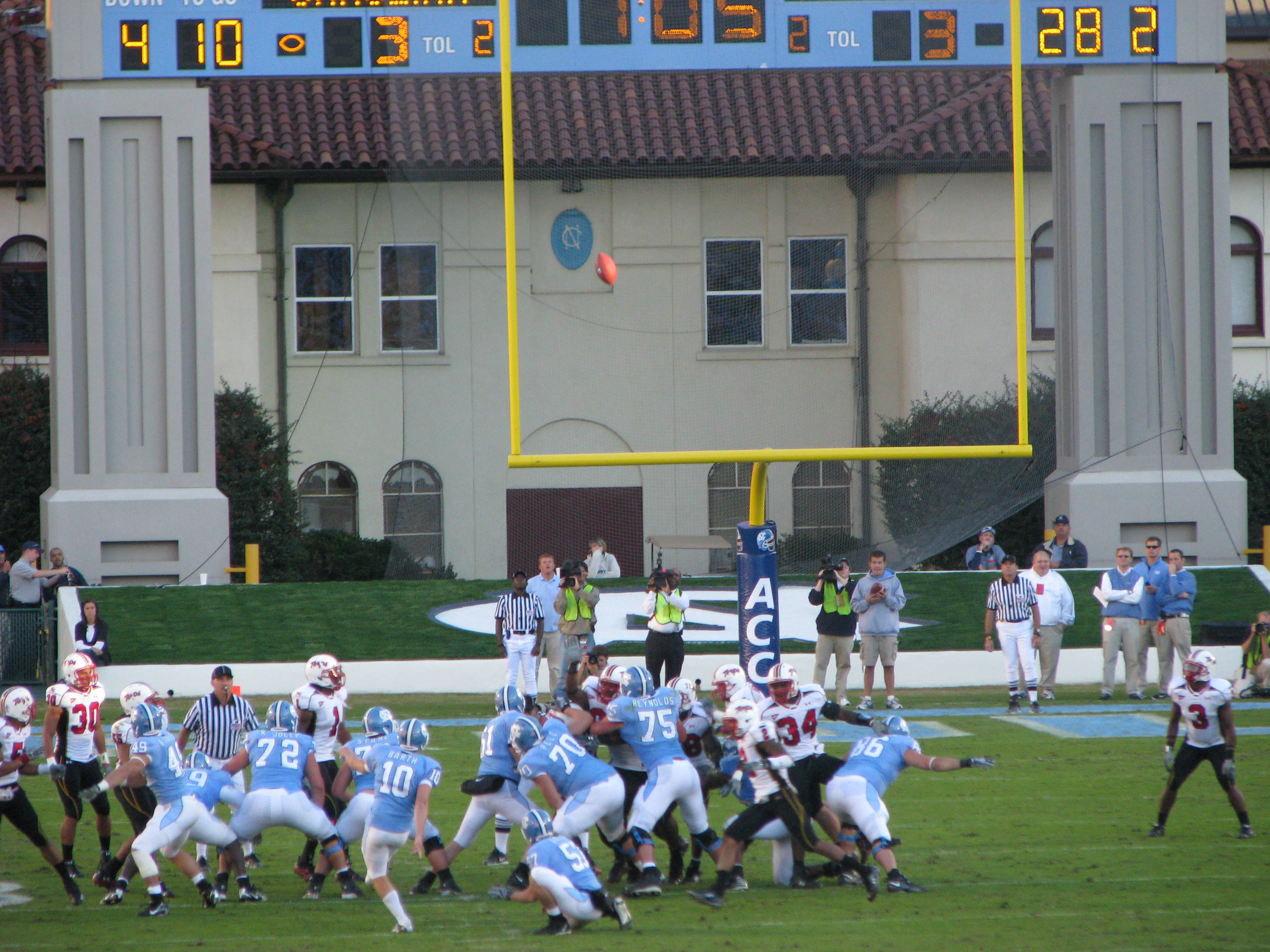
North Carolina kicks a field goal in its 16–13 victory at Chapel Hill.

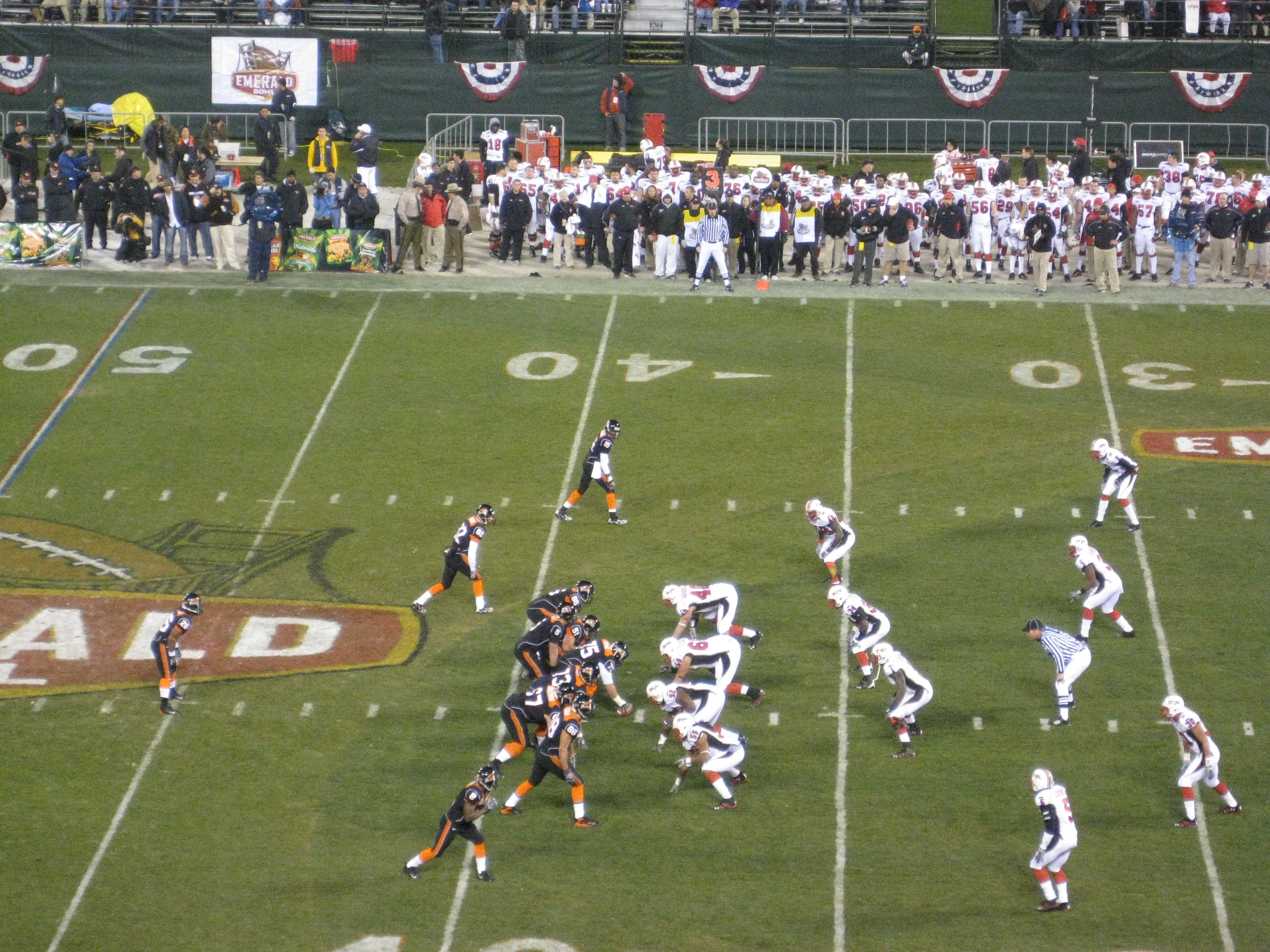
The Terrapins' defense lines up against Oregon State in the Emerald Bowl.

=== Depth chart ===
**Bold** indicates starter as of 02 Dec 07
**Offense** **X-Receiver**: **8 Darrius Heyward-Bey**; 7 Adrian Cannon; **Left Tackle**: **77 Scott Burley**; 74 Bruce Campbell; 71 Paul Pinegar; **Left Guard**: **72 Phil Costa**; 61 Lee Oliver; **Center**: **60 Edwin Williams**; 65 Danny Edwards; **Right Guard**: **63 Andrew Crummey**; 67 Jack Griffin; 70 Lamar Young; **Right Tackle**: **75 Dane Randolph**; 67 Jack Griffin; 73 Stephen St. John; **Tight end**: **80 Joey Haynos**; 13 Dan Gronkowski; 45 Tommy Galt; **Quarterback**: **10 Chris Turner**; 19 Jordan Steffy; 11 Jamarr Robinson; **Tailback**: **44 Lance Ball**; 21 Keon Lattimore; 23 Da'Rel Scott; 20 Morgan Green; **Fullback**: **38 Cory Jackson**; 47 Haroon Brown; 46 Steven Pfister; **Z-Receiver**: **84 Isaiah Williams**; 18 LaQuan Williams; 87 Kevin Gresham; **Slot Receiver**: **83 Emani Lee-Odai**; 89 Matt Goldberg; **H-Back**: **15 Jason Goode**; 86 Drew Gloster; Injured: LG 76 Jaimie Thomas; WR 17 Danny Oquendo	**Defense** **Defensive end**: **40 Jeremy Navarre**; 57 Jared Harrell; **Defensive tackle**: **68 Carlos Feliciano**; 40 Jeremy Navarre; 97 Dean Muhtadi; **Defensive tackle**: **92 Dre Moore**; 90 Travis Ivey; 96 Olugbemi Otulaja; 56 Deegee Galt; **LEO**: **55 Trey Covington**; 50 Jermaine Lemons; 47 Jeff Clement; **MIKE**: **34 Dave Philistin**; 42 Chase Bullock; **WILL**: **1 Erin Henderson**; 54 Adrian Moten; 52 Chris Clinton; **SAM**: 48 **Moise Fokou**; 54 Adrian Moten; **Cornerback**: **5 Isaiah Gardner**; 6 Anthony Wiseman; 9 Richard Taylor; **Free Safety**: **30 J.J. Justice**; 10 Terrell Skinner; 4 Jamari McCollough; **Strong Safety**: **3 Christian Varner**; 29 Jeff Allen; 27 Dominique Herald; **Cornerback**: **2 Kevin Barnes**; 14 Nolan Carroll; 25 Colin Nelson; Injured: DE 91 Mack Frost; LB 43 Rick Costa; LB 33 Alex Wujciak; SS 22 Drew Robinson	**Special teams** **Placekicker**: **39 Obi Egekeze**; 35 Travis Baltz; **KO**: **49 Chris Roberts**; 35 Travis Baltz; 39 Obi Egekeze; **Punter**: **35 Travis Baltz**; 49 Chris Roberts; **Punt Returner**: **6 Anthony Wiseman**; 3 Christian Varner; **Kick returner**: **23 Da'Rel Scott**; 6 Anthony Wiseman; **Holder**: **89 Matt Goldberg**; 13 Dan Gronkowski; **Long snapper**: **31 Andrew Schmitt**; **Strong Safety**: **53 Brendan McDermond**

== Statistics ==
=== Passing ===
Player	G	QB Rat.	Comp.	Att.	Pct.	Yards	TD	INT	Long
Chris Turner	10	136.7	136	212	64.2	1,753	5	5	78
Jordan Steffy	7	121.4	70	104	67.3	686	2	4	39

=== Rushing ===
Player	G	Att.	Yards	Avg.	TD	Long	Avg./G
Keon Lattimore	11	206	789	3.8	13	42	71.7
Lance Ball	12	172	763	4.4	12	32	63.6

=== Receiving ===
Player	G	No.	Yards	Avg.	TD	Long	Avg./G
Darrius Heyward-Bey	12	48	687	14.3	2	47	57.2
Joey Haynos	12	27	287	10.6	0	28	23.9

== 2008 NFL draft ==
The following players were selected in the 2008 NFL draft.

Player	Position	Round	Overall	NFL team
Dre Moore	Defensive back	4	115	Tampa Bay Buccaneers

At the end of the season, Erin Henderson declared himself eligible for the 2008 NFL draft; he was signed by the Vikings as an undrafted free agent.
