= 2007 Clemson Tigers football team =

American college football season

2007 Clemson Tigers football

Chick-fil-A Bowl, L 20–23 ^{OT} vs. Auburn
- Conference: Atlantic Coast Conference
- Atlantic Division

Ranking
- Coaches: No. 22
- AP: No. 20
- Record: 9–4 (5–3 ACC)
- Head coach: Tommy Bowden (9th season)
- Offensive coordinator: Rob Spence (3rd season)
- Defensive coordinator: Vic Koenning (3rd season)
- Base defense: 4–3
- Captains: Michael Hamlin; Cullen Harper
- Home stadium: Memorial Stadium

2007 Atlantic Coast Conference football standings
	Conf.			Overall
Team	W		L	W		L
Atlantic Division
No. 10 Boston College x	6	–	2	11	–	3
No. 21 Clemson	5	–	3	9	–	4
Wake Forest	5	–	3	9	–	4
Florida State	4	–	4	7	–	6
Maryland	3	–	5	6	–	7
NC State	3	–	5	5	–	7
Coastal Division
No. 9 Virginia Tech x$	7	–	1	11	–	3
Virginia	6	–	2	9	–	4
Georgia Tech	4	–	4	7	–	6
North Carolina	3	–	5	4	–	8
Miami (FL)	2	–	6	5	–	7
Duke	0	–	8	1	–	11
Championship: Virginia Tech 30, Boston College 16
$ – BCS representative as conference champion; % – BCS at-large representative; x – Division champion/co-champions; Rankings from AP Poll

The 2007 Clemson Tigers football team represented Clemson University as a member of the Atlantic Coast Conference (ACC) during the 2007 NCAA Division I FBS football season. Led by ninth-year head coach Tommy Bowden, the Tigers compiled an overall record of 9–4 with a mark of 5–3 in conference play, tying for second place in the ACC's Atlantic Division. Clemson was invited to the Chick-fil-A Bowl, where the Tigers lost to Auburn in overtime. The team played home games at Memorial Stadium in Clemson, South Carolina.

== Schedule ==
Date	Time	Opponent	Rank	Site	TV	Result	Attendance
September 3	8:00 p.m.	No. 19 Florida State		Memorial Stadium; Clemson, SC (rivalry)	ESPN	W 24–18	81,993
September 8	1:00 p.m.	Louisiana–Monroe*	No. 25	Memorial Stadium; Clemson, SC	ESPNGP	W 49–26	77,628
September 15	1:00 p.m.	No. 15 (FCS) Furman*	No. 20	Memorial Stadium; Clemson, SC	ESPNGP	W 38–10	80,419
September 22	12:00 p.m.	at NC State	No. 15	Carter–Finley Stadium; Raleigh, NC (Textile Bowl)	LFS	W 42–20	56,903
September 29	3:30 p.m.	at Georgia Tech	No. 13	Bobby Dodd Stadium; Atlanta, GA (rivalry)	ABC	L 3–13	54,635
October 6	6:00 p.m.	No. 15 Virginia Tech	No. 22	Memorial Stadium; Clemson, SC	ESPN	L 23–41	82,047
October 20	12:00 p.m.	Central Michigan*^{†}		Memorial Stadium; Clemson, SC	ESPNU	W 70–14	81,361
October 27	3:30 p.m.	at Maryland		Byrd Stadium; College Park, MD	ABC	W 30–17	50,948
November 3	12:00 p.m.	at Duke	No. 25	Wallace Wade Stadium; Durham, NC	ESPNGP	W 47–10	20,457
November 10	12:00 p.m.	Wake Forest	No. 20	Memorial Stadium; Clemson, SC	ESPN2	W 44–10	82,422
November 17	7:45 p.m.	No. 18 Boston College	No. 15	Memorial Stadium; Clemson, SC	ESPN2	L 17–20	83,472
November 24	7:00 p.m.	at South Carolina*	No. 21	Williams–Brice Stadium; Columbia, SC (rivalry)	ESPN2	W 23–21	82,410
December 31	7:45 p.m.	vs. No. 22 Auburn*	No. 15	Georgia Dome; Atlanta, GA (Chick-fil-A Bowl, rivalry)	ESPN	L 20–23 ^{OT}	74,413
*Non-conference game; ^{†}Homecoming; Rankings from AP Poll released prior to the game; All times are in Eastern time

== Rankings ==
Ranking movements Legend: ██ Increase in ranking ██ Decrease in ranking — = Not ranked RV = Received votes
	Week															
Poll	Pre	1	2	3	4	5	6	7	8	9	10	11	12	13	14	Final
AP	RV	25	20	15	13	22	RV	RV	RV	25	20	15	21	16	15	21
Coaches	RV	RV	20	14	13	22	RV	RV	RV	24	20	16	22	17	16	22
Harris	Not released				13	22	RV	RV	RV	RV	20	16	22	18	16	Not released
BCS	Not released							—	—	25	21	15	22	16	15	Not released

== Preseason ==
In the preseason, incoming quarterback Willy Korn was named one of the top ten impact freshman for 2007.

== Game summaries ==
=== No. 19 Florida State ===
	1	2	3	4	Total
Seminoles	0	3	8	7	18
Tigers	14	10	0	0	24

=== Louisiana–Monroe ===
	1	2	3	4	Total
Warhawks	7	3	3	13	26
No. 25 Tigers	14	14	14	7	49

=== Furman ===
	1	2	3	4	Total
Paladins	0	3	0	7	10
No. 20 Tigers	10	7	7	14	38

=== At NC State ===
	1	2	3	4	Total
No. 15 Tigers	0	0	0	0	0
Wolfpack	0	0	0	0	0

=== At Georgia Tech ===
	1	2	3	4	Total
No. 13 Tigers	3	0	0	0	3
Yellow Jackets	7	0	3	3	13

=== No. 15 Virginia Tech ===
	1	2	3	4	Total
No. 15 Hokies	17	14	0	10	41
No. 22 Tigers	0	8	0	15	23

=== Central Michigan ===
	1	2	3	4	Total
Chippewas	7	0	7	0	14
Tigers	7	28	28	7	70

=== At Maryland ===
	1	2	3	4	Total
Tigers	0	0	0	0	0
Terrapins	0	0	0	0	0

=== At Duke ===
	1	2	3	4	Total
No. 25 Tigers	3	23	14	7	47
Blue Devils	7	0	0	3	10

=== Wake Forest ===
	1	2	3	4	Total
Demon Deacons	7	0	3	0	10
No. 20 Tigers	10	17	10	7	44

=== No. 18 Boston College ===
	1	2	3	4	Total
No. 18 Eagles	0	3	0	17	20
No. 15 Tigers	7	0	3	7	17

=== At South Carolina ===
	1	2	3	4	Total
No. 21 Tigers	0	0	0	0	0
Gamecocks	0	0	0	0	0

=== Vs. No. 22 Auburn—Chick-fil-A Bowl ===
	1	2	3	4	OT	Total
No. 15 Clemson Tigers	0	7	0	10	3	20
No. 22 Auburn Tigers	3	0	7	7	6	23

== Personnel ==
=== Coaching staff ===
- Tommy Bowden – Head coach
- Rob Spence – Offensive coordinator/quarterbacks
- Vic Koenning – Defensive Coordinator/Defensive backs
- Brad Scott – Assistant head coach/offensive line
- David Blackwell – Linebackers
- Andre Powell – Running backs
- Billy Napier – Tight ends/recruiting coordinator
- Chris Rumph – Defensive line
- Dabo Swinney – Wide receivers
- Ron West – Outside linebackers
- Mike Dooley – Defensive video graduate assistant
- Andy Ford – Defensive graduate assistant
- Paul Hogan – Offensive graduate assistant

=== Depth chart ===
These were the projected starters and primary backups as of April 9, 2007.

Defense

FS
Chris Clemons
Chris Russell

WLB	MLB	SLB
⋅	Antonio Clay	⋅
Kavell Conner	Kevin Alexander	⋅

Cat
Michael Hamlin
DeAndre McDaniel

CB
Crezdon Butler
Byron Maxwell

DE	DT	DT	DE
Ricky Sapp	Dorrell Scott	Rashaad Jackson	Phillip Merling
Kwam Williams	Jock McKissic	Antwon Murchison	Jamie Cumbie

CB
Chris Chancellor
Haydrian Lewis

Offense

WR
Aaron Kelly
Xavier Dye

WR
Rendrick Taylor
Tyler Grisham

LT	LG	C	RG	RT
Barry Richardson	Chris McDuffie	Barry Humphries	Thomas Austin	Chris Capote
Chris Hairston	Jamarcus Grant	Bobby Hutchinson	Brandon Pilgrim	Cory Lambert

TE
Michael Palmer
Akeem Robinson

WR
Jacoby Ford
La'Donte Harris

QB
Cullen Harper
Willy Korn

Key reserves
RB Sadat Chambers

RB
James Davis
C. J. Spiller
