= 2007 Virginia Tech Hokies football team =

American college football season

2007 Virginia Tech Hokies football

ACC champion ACC Coastal Division champion

ACC Championship Game, W 30–16 vs. Boston College

Orange Bowl, L 21–24 vs. Kansas
- Conference: Atlantic Coast Conference
- Coastal Division

Ranking
- Coaches: No. 9
- AP: No. 9
- Record: 11–3 (7–1 ACC)
- Head coach: Frank Beamer (21st season)
- Offensive coordinator: Bryan Stinespring (6th season)
- Offensive scheme: Pro-style
- Defensive coordinator: Bud Foster (13th season)
- Base defense: 4–4
- Home stadium: Lane Stadium

2007 Atlantic Coast Conference football standings
	Conf.			Overall
Team	W		L	W		L
Atlantic Division
No. 10 Boston College x	6	–	2	11	–	3
No. 21 Clemson	5	–	3	9	–	4
Wake Forest	5	–	3	9	–	4
Florida State	4	–	4	7	–	6
Maryland	3	–	5	6	–	7
NC State	3	–	5	5	–	7
Coastal Division
No. 9 Virginia Tech x$	7	–	1	11	–	3
Virginia	6	–	2	9	–	4
Georgia Tech	4	–	4	7	–	6
North Carolina	3	–	5	4	–	8
Miami (FL)	2	–	6	5	–	7
Duke	0	–	8	1	–	11
Championship: Virginia Tech 30, Boston College 16
$ – BCS representative as conference champion; % – BCS at-large representative; x – Division champion/co-champions; Rankings from AP Poll

The 2007 Virginia Tech Hokies football team represented Virginia Polytechnic Institute and State University during the 2007 NCAA Division I FBS football season. The team's head coach was Frank Beamer. Tech finished the season with an 11-3 record and won its second ACC football championship in its first four years in the league. The team jumped to as high as number 5 in the BCS football rankings and lost 24-21 in the 2008 Orange Bowl.

Tech lost an early season game to number 2 LSU in Death Valley 48-7 and then won five games in a row, jumping up to the eight spot in the Associated Press poll. In the following game, Tech held a 10-0 lead late in the fourth quarter before Matt Ryan led the Eagles to two touchdowns, aided by a recovered onside kick, and beat the home team 13-10. The Hokies then won four more straight games, including a battle with UVA for the Coastal Division title, before taking on Boston College for a rematch in the ACC Championship. Tech won the championship and earned a trip to the Orange Bowl.

The Hokies entered the season returning nine starters on offense and eight on defense, including All-American cornerback Brandon Flowers, from a 2006 team that went 10-3 and finished second in the ACC's Coastal Division behind Georgia Tech.

After the April 16 shooting on the Virginia Tech campus claimed the lives of 32 students and faculty members, the remainder of spring practice was canceled. The Hokies had been scheduled to hold two more practices in addition to a spring game on Saturday following the Monday tragedy. As a special tribute, ESPN's College GameDay program broadcast from Blacksburg for the Hokies' opening game against East Carolina.

== Schedule ==
Date	Time	Opponent	Rank	Site	TV	Result	Attendance	Source
September 1	12:00 p.m.	East Carolina*	No. 9	Lane Stadium; Blacksburg, VA (College GameDay)	ESPN	W 17–7	66,233	
September 8	9:15 p.m.	at No. 2 LSU*	No. 9	Tiger Stadium; Baton Rouge, LA (College GameDay)	ESPN	L 7–48	92,739	
September 15	1:30 p.m.	Ohio*	No. 18	Lane Stadium; Blacksburg, VA	ESPN360	W 28–7	66,233	
September 22	1:30 pm	William & Mary*	No. 17	Lane Stadium; Blacksburg, VA	ACC Select	W 44–3	66,233	
September 29	12:00 p.m.	North Carolina^{†}	No. 17	Lane Stadium; Blacksburg, VA	LFS	W 17–10	66,233	
October 6	6:00 p.m.	at No. 22 Clemson	No. 15	Memorial Stadium; Clemson, SC	ESPN	W 41–23	82,047	
October 13	12:00 pm	at Duke	No. 12	Wallace Wade Stadium; Durham, NC	LFS	W 43–14	23,691	
October 25	7:45 p.m.	No. 2 Boston College	No. 8	Lane Stadium; Blacksburg, VA (rivalry)	ESPN	L 10–14	66,233	
November 1	7:45 p.m.	at Georgia Tech	No. 11	Bobby Dodd Stadium; Atlanta, GA (rivalry)	ESPN	W 27–3	52,202	
November 10	3:30 p.m.	Florida State	No. 11	Lane Stadium; Blacksburg, VA	ABC	W 40–21	66,233	
November 17	3:30 p.m.	Miami (FL)	No. 10	Lane Stadium; Blacksburg, VA (rivalry)	ABC	W 44–14	66,233	
November 24	12:00 p.m.	at No. 16 Virginia	No. 8	Scott Stadium; Charlottesville, VA (rivalry)	ESPN	W 33–21	61,711	
December 1	1:00 p.m.	vs. No. 12 Boston College	No. 6	Jacksonville Municipal Stadium; Jacksonville, FL (ACC Championship Game)	ABC	W 30–16	53,212	
January 3, 2008	8:00 p.m.	vs. No. 8 Kansas*	No. 5	Dolphin Stadium; Miami Gardens, FL (Orange Bowl)	FOX	L 21–24	74,111	
*Non-conference game; ^{†}Homecoming; Rankings from AP Poll released prior to the game; All times are in Eastern time

== Rankings ==
Ranking movements Legend: ██ Increase in ranking ██ Decrease in ranking т = Tied with team above or below
	Week															
Poll	Pre	1	2	3	4	5	6	7	8	9	10	11	12	13	14	Final
AP	9	9	18	17	17	15	12	11	8	11	11	10	8	6	5	9
Coaches	9	9	17	17	14	14	10	11	9	13	11	10	8	5T	5	9
Harris	Not released				16	15	12	13	10	14	13	10	8	7	6	Not released
BCS	Not released							11	8	11	11	10	8	6	3	Not released

== Personnel ==
=== Coaching staff ===
Position	Name	First year at VT	First year in current position
Head coach	Frank Beamer	1987	1987
Associate head coach and running backs coach	Billy Hite	1978	2001
Offensive coordinator and tight ends	Bryan Stinespring	1990	2006 (offensive coordinator since 2002)
Defensive coordinator and inside linebackers	Bud Foster	1987	1995
Offensive Line	Curt Newsome	2006	2006
Wide Receivers	Kevin Sherman	2006	2006
Strong Safety, Outside Linebackers, and Recruiting Coordinator	Jim Cavanaugh	1996	2002
Quarterbacks	Mike O'Cain	2006	2006
Defensive backs	Torrian Gray	2006	2006
Defensive Line	Charley Wiles	1996	1996
Source: hokiesports.com

=== Roster ===
Flanker: Paul Debnam – Sophomore; Matt Finnegan – RS Sophomore; **4 Eddie Royal** – Senior; 19 Josh Hyman – RS Senior; 34 Danny Coale – Redshirting; 48 Jacob Sykes – Freshman; 80 Brandon Dillard – RS Sophomore; Split End: Michael Reid – Junior; **2 Josh Morgan** – Senior; 3 Ike Whitaker – RS Sophomore; 16 Zach Luckett – RS Freshman; 37 Patrick Terry – Freshman; **81 Justin Harper – Senior**; 87 Prince Parker – RS Freshman; Center: Barrett Mears – RS Freshman; **58 Ryan Shuman** – RS Junior; 60 Beau Warren – RS Freshman; 69 Michael Cassidy – RS Freshman; Offensive Guard: 51 Matt Welsh – RS Junior; **64 Richard Graham** – RS Sophomore; 66 Brandon Holland – Sophomore; 68 Jaymes Brooks – Freshman; 69 Hivera Green – RS Sophomore; **70 Sergio Render** – Sophomore; 74 Khalil Latif – Freshman; 79 Eric Davis – RS Sophomore; Offensive Tackle: 57 Clark Crum – RS Freshman; 62 Blake DeChristopher – Freshman; 63 Will Alvarez – Freshman; **67 Nick Marshman** – RS Junior; 71 Aaron Brown – RS Freshman; **76 Duane Brown** – RS Senior; 77 Ed Wang – RS Sophomore; Tight End: Andrew Lanier – Freshman; 8 Greg Boone – RS Sophomore; **83 Sam Wheeler** – RS Sophomore; 86 Chris Drager – Freshman; 88 Andre Smith – RS Freshman; 94 Greg Nosal – Freshman	Quarterback: 3 Jeff Beyer – Sophomore; **5 Tyrod Taylor** – Freshman; 7 **Sean Glennon** – RS Junior; 12 Cory Holt – RS Junior; 14 Grant Throckmorton – RS Senior; Tailback: D.J. Thomas – Freshman; 20 Kenny Lewis Jr. – Sophomore; 32 DuVall Gibson-"Freshman"; 27 Jahre Cheeseman – RS Sophomore; **28 Brandon Ore** – RS Junior; 29 Devin Radford – RS Freshman; 30 Josh Oglesby – Freshman; 35 Dustin Pickle – Junior; 38 Elan Lewis – RS Sophomore; 40 Darren Evans – Freshman; **Fullback**: Kenny Younger – Sophomore; **39 Carlton Weatherford** – RS Senior; 40 Billy Gorham – Senior; 42 Kenny Jefferson – RS Sophomore; 44 Devin Perez – RS Junior; Defensive tackle: Courtney Prince – Freshman; 55 Daryl Robertson – RS Freshman; **59 Barry Booker** – RS Senior; 75 Kory Robertson – RS Senior; 91 John Graves – RS Freshman; 93 Kwamaine Battle – Freshman; 95 Cordarrow Thompson – RS Sophomore; **99 Carlton Powell** – RS Senior; Defensive End: Chad Carlson – RS Sophomore; Miles Sanchez – RS Sophomore; Jacob Gardner – RS Sophomore; Dylan McGreevy – Junior; 43 Jason Worilds – RS Freshman; 47 Nekos Brown – Sophomore; **49 Chris Ellis** – RS Senior; 56 Demetrius Taylor – RS Sophomore; **90 Orion Martin** – RS Junior; 96 Justin Young – RS Freshman	Cornerback: Ron Cooper – Sophomore; 1 **Victor Harris** – Junior; ~~15 Roland Minor – RS Senior~~; 18 **Brandon Flowers** – RS Junior; 21 Rashad Carmichael – RS Freshman; 22 Stephan Virgil – Sophomore; 36 Cris Hill – Freshman; Linebacker: Mark Muncey – RS Freshman; Quillie Odom – Freshman; Tim Richardson – RS Freshman; Alonzo Tweedy – Freshman; 6 Andrew Bowman – RS Junior; **9 Vince Hall** – RS Senior; **11 Xavier Adibi** – RS Senior; 13 Corey Gordon – RS Senior; 26 Cody Grimm – RS Sophomore; 33 Brett Warren – RS Junior; **41 Cam Martin** – RS Sophomore; 45 Purnell Sturdivant – RS Junior; 46 Hunter Ovens – Freshman; 52 Barquell Rivers – Freshman; 82 Steven Friday – RS Freshman; 89 Jonas Houseright – RS Junior; Free Safety: ~~23 Mario Edwards – RS Freshman~~; **25 D.J. Parker** – Senior; 31 Davon Morgan – Freshman; Rover: **17 Kam Chancellor** – Sophomore; 24 Dorian Porch – RS Sophomore; 86 Matt Reidy – Sophomore; Snapper: 63 Matt Tuttle – Junior; **54 Bart McMillin** – RS Senior; **61 Scott King** – Senior; Punter: Brian Saunders – RS Freshman; **97 Brent Bowden** – RS Sophomore; Place Kicker: Dustin Keys – RS Sophomore; Matt Waldron – RS Freshman; **92 Jud Dunlevy** – RS Senior; 98 Jared Develli – Senior; Athlete: Kendrick Pressley – Freshman
Source: hokiesports.com Starters are in **bold**, based on pre-season depth chart from the 2007 media guide

=== Recruiting ===
National Signing Day was on 2007-02-07. The Hokies' recruiting class was highlighted by Tyrod Taylor, who was rated the #1 dual threat quarterback in the country. Taylor was announced as the Hokies' #2 quarterback on August 21.

Below is a list of the recruits that signed their letter of intent with Virginia Tech:

College recruiting information
Name	Hometown	School	Height	Weight	40^{‡}	Commit date
**Will Alvarez**; OL	Woodbridge, Virginia	C. D. Hylton	6 ft 5 in (1.96 m)	315 lb (143 kg)	5.6	Jun 15, 2006
**Will Alvarez**; OL	Recruit ratings: Scout: Rivals: (77)					
**Brandon Barden**; TE	Lincolnton, Georgia	Lincoln County	6 ft 5 in (1.96 m)	211 lb (96 kg)	4.6	Jan 1, 2006
**Brandon Barden**; TE	Recruit ratings: Scout: Rivals: (71)					
**Kwamaine Battle**; DT	Bailey, North Carolina	Southern Nash	6 ft 1 in (1.85 m)	260 lb (120 kg)	4.9	Jul 8, 2006
**Kwamaine Battle**; DT	Recruit ratings: Scout: Rivals: (71)					
**Jaymes Brooks**; OL	Newport News, Virginia	Denbigh	6 ft 3 in (1.91 m)	290 lb (130 kg)	4.93	Jul 28, 2007
**Jaymes Brooks**; OL	Recruit ratings: Scout: Rivals: (40)					
**Collin Carroll**; LS/C	Hopkins, Minnesota	Edina	6 ft 4 in (1.93 m)	260 lb (120 kg)	-	Jan 29, 2007
**Collin Carroll**; LS/C	Recruit ratings: Scout: Rivals: (40)					
**Danny Coale**; WR	Lexington, Virginia	Episcopal	6 ft 0 in (1.83 m)	195 lb (88 kg)	4.42	Jun 14, 2006
**Danny Coale**; WR	Recruit ratings: Scout: Rivals: (69)					
**Blake DeChristopher**; OL	Midlothian, Virginia	Clover Hill	6 ft 6 in (1.98 m)	310 lb (140 kg)	5	Jul 5, 2005
**Blake DeChristopher**; OL	Recruit ratings: Scout: Rivals: (79)					
**Chris Drager**; TE	Jefferson Hills, Pennsylvania	Thomas Jefferson	6 ft 4 in (1.93 m)	234 lb (106 kg)	4.8	Jul 9, 2006
**Chris Drager**; TE	Recruit ratings: Scout: Rivals: (74)					
**Darren Evans**; RB	Indianapolis	Warren Central	6 ft 1 in (1.85 m)	217 lb (98 kg)	4.71	Jul 15, 2006
**Darren Evans**; RB	Recruit ratings: Scout: Rivals: (79)					
**Cris Hill**; DB	Highland Springs, Virginia	Highland Springs	5 ft 11 in (1.80 m)	190 lb (86 kg)	4.4	Dec 14, 2006
**Cris Hill**; DB	Recruit ratings: Scout: Rivals: (78)					
**Andrew Lanier**; TE	Spartanburg, South Carolina	Dorman	6 ft 5 in (1.96 m)	250 lb (110 kg)	4.7	Jul 6, 2006
**Andrew Lanier**; TE	Recruit ratings: Scout: Rivals: (40)					
**Ibn Latif**; OL	Midlothian, Virginia	Manchester	6 ft 3 in (1.91 m)	290 lb (130 kg)	4.92	Jul 31, 2006
**Ibn Latif**; OL	Recruit ratings: Scout: Rivals: (74)					
**Davon Morgan**; ATH	Richmond, Virginia	Varina	6 ft 0 in (1.83 m)	186 lb (84 kg)	4.58	Jul 26, 2006
**Davon Morgan**; ATH	Recruit ratings: Scout: Rivals: (77)					
**Greg Nosal**; TE	Virginia Beach, Virginia	Kellam	6 ft 7 in (2.01 m)	255 lb (116 kg)	5	Jul 25, 2007
**Greg Nosal**; TE	Recruit ratings: Scout: Rivals: (40)					
**Quillie Odom**; LB	Potomac, Virginia	Osbourn Park	6 ft 2 in (1.88 m)	200 lb (91 kg)	4.6	May 31, 2006
**Quillie Odom**; LB	Recruit ratings: Scout: Rivals: (71)					
**Josh Oglesby**; RB	Garner, North Carolina	Garner	5 ft 11 in (1.80 m)	205 lb (93 kg)	4.43	Jul 15, 2006
**Josh Oglesby**; RB	Recruit ratings: Scout: Rivals: (77)					
**Hunter Ovens**; LB	Sarasota, Florida	Cardinal Mooney	6 ft 2 in (1.88 m)	220 lb (100 kg)	4.5	Aug 21, 2006
**Hunter Ovens**; LB	Recruit ratings: Scout: Rivals: (74)					
**Kendrick Pressley**; ATH	Sumter, South Carolina	Sumter	5 ft 11 in (1.80 m)	168 lb (76 kg)	4.62	Oct 20, 2006
**Kendrick Pressley**; ATH	Recruit ratings: Scout: Rivals: (40)					
**Courtney Prince**; DT	Brandywine, Maryland	Gwynn Park	6 ft 2 in (1.88 m)	253 lb (115 kg)	5	Jul 31, 2006
**Courtney Prince**; DT	Recruit ratings: Scout: Rivals: (69)					
**Barquell Rivers**; LB	Wadesboro, North Carolina	Anson	5 ft 11 in (1.80 m)	208 lb (94 kg)	4.5	Aug 1, 2006
**Barquell Rivers**; LB	Recruit ratings: Scout: Rivals: (78)					
**Tyrod Taylor**; QB	Hampton, Virginia	Hampton	6 ft 1 in (1.85 m)	200 lb (91 kg)	4.55	Jul 21, 2006
**Tyrod Taylor**; QB	Recruit ratings: Scout: Rivals: (84)					
**Patrick Terry**; WR	South Boston, Virginia	Halifax County	6 ft 0 in (1.83 m)	180 lb (82 kg)	4.5	Jul 8, 2006
**Patrick Terry**; WR	Recruit ratings: Scout: Rivals: (40)					
**D.J. Thomas**; ATH	Ashland, Virginia	Patrick Henry	5 ft 10 in (1.78 m)	170 lb (77 kg)	4.56	Aug 15, 2006
**D.J. Thomas**; ATH	Recruit ratings: Scout: Rivals: (78)					
**Alonzo Tweedy**; ATH	Richmond, Virginia	Hermitage	6 ft 1 in (1.85 m)	173 lb (78 kg)	4.5	Jul 31, 2006
**Alonzo Tweedy**; ATH	Recruit ratings: Scout: Rivals: (74)					
**Justin Young**; DE	Germantown, Maryland	Northwest	6 ft 5 in (1.96 m)	255 lb (116 kg)	4.8	Jul 25, 2006
**Justin Young**; DE	Recruit ratings: Scout: Rivals: (40)					
Overall recruit ranking: Scout: 24 Rivals: 29
‡ Refers to 40-yard dash; Note: In many cases, Scout, Rivals, 247Sports, On3, and ESPN may conflict in their listings of height, weight and 40 time.; In these cases, the average was taken. ESPN grades are on a 100-point scale.; Sources: "Virginia Tech 2007 Football Commitments". Rivals.; "2007 Virginia Tech Commits". Scout.; "2007 Player Commitments – Virginia Tech". ESPN.; "Scout.com Team Recruiting Rankings". Scout.; "2007 Team Ranking". Rivals.com.

== Awards and honors ==
Xavier Adibi, Chris Ellis, Victor Harris, and Eddie Royal were honored as first team all-ACC, while Barry Booker, Duane Brown and Brandon Flowers were recognized on the second team.
