= Kirby Freeman =

American football player (born 1985)

No. 7
- Position: Quarterback

Personal information
- Born: March 28, 1985 (age 41); Abilene, Texas, U.S.
- Listed height: 6 ft 3 in (1.91 m)
- Listed weight: 210 lb (95 kg)

Career information
- High school: Brownwood (TX)
- College: Baylor
- NFL draft: 2009: undrafted

Career history
- San Francisco 49ers (2009)*
- * Offseason or practice squad member only

Kirby Lyn Freeman (born March 28, 1985) is an American former professional football quarterback. He was signed by the San Francisco 49ers as an undrafted free agent in 2009. He played college football at Miami and Baylor.

== Early life ==
Kirby Freeman played high school football at Brownwood High School, Brownwood, Texas, where his father coached. Freeman played on his varsity football team all four years he was in high school. He was a SuperPrep All-American and was rated the No. 2 quarterback in the nation and the No. 3 overall prospect in Texas by SuperPrep.

Freeman was selected to the Elite 11 where the top 11 quarterbacks across the nation traveled to Southern California to compete and work with Coach Bob Johnson. Going into his senior football season at Brownwood, Freeman was considered arguably the best quarterback in the country. Fellow Texan, Rhett Bomar of Grand Prairie and Freeman were the most touted quarterbacks of the 2004 NCAA signing class. Freeman was named the second best quarterback in the country by the recruiting services Rivals.com and Scout.com

Freeman was a Nike All-American, EA Sports Elite 11 selection, SuperPrep All-American, & selected to play in the Army All-American Bowl but declined due to early high school graduation and early enrollment at the University of Miami.

As a junior in 2002 he passed for 1,487 yards while completing 87 of 150 passes, 14 for touchdowns, with eight interceptions, as the team advanced to the Class 4A Division I state semifinals. As a senior in 2003 he passed for 1,454 yards and 10 touchdowns with four interceptions on 71 of 123 passing also running for 956 yards and 14 touchdowns on 128 carries. Despite missing four games due to injury, Freeman led Brownwood to an 11–1 season in 2003, reaching the Class 4A Area round.

As a high school punter he averaged 43.7 yards.

Freeman chose the University of Miami over Texas, Oklahoma State, Nebraska, LSU, UCLA, Purdue University, Arizona, and Arizona State.

== College career ==
=== Miami ===
Kirby Freeman graduated from high school early in order to enroll and attend practices at the University of Miami for the spring 2004 semester. Freeman played in nine games as a redshirt freshman.

During his freshman year, Freeman was named the Hurricanes Offensive Rookie of the Year, completing 15 of 31 passes (48.4 percent) for 183 yards, two touchdowns and two interceptions. Feeman eight rushes for 38 yards.

Freeman served as the team's No. 2 quarterback behind Kyle Wright for much of the 2006 season. In a game against Virginia Tech, Freeman replaced an injured Wright in the second quarter, and led the team to its first touchdown of the game.

Freeman played in nine games as a redshirt freshman. Going into his sophomore year, Freeman competed with Wright for the starting role during spring practice, ultimately remaining a backup quarterback.

After Wright suffered a season-ending thumb injury, Freeman started the final four games of the 2006 season, and led the Hurricanes to a 17–14 victory over Boston College in the regular season finale; the win made Miami bowl-eligible. In the 2006 MPC Computers Bowl, Freeman completed 11 of 19 passes for 272 yards and two touchdowns in Miami's 21–20 win over Nevada; Freeman also rushed for a touchdown en route to being named MVP of the game.

On August 28, 2007, head coach Randy Shannon named Freeman the starting quarterback over Wright for the season-opening game against Marshall. Freeman, despite going 9-for-21 for 81 yards with one touchdown, one interception, and 20 yards rushing in his first start, drew praise from Shannon for "controlling" the game, a 31-3 Miami win. The following week, Freeman struggled to complete 3 of 10 passes for 17 yards, and was replaced by Wright for part of the third quarter in a 51–13 loss to Oklahoma. In Freeman's two starts, Miami ranked 118th out of 119 major college schools in passing offense both in average yards per game and yards per attempt. On September 11, Shannon announced that Wright would reclaim his starting role for the September 15th game against FIU.

On October 20, Freeman threw the go-ahead touchdown pass against Florida State; against NC State the following week, Freeman went 1-for-14 with one touchdown and three interceptions.

Freeman finished his final season with Miami by passing for 256 yards and throwing for 3 touchdowns. Freeman transferred to Baylor after the season, citing differences with head coach Randy Shannon.

=== Baylor ===
After winning the quarterbacking job at Baylor University in spring practice, Freeman started against the Wake Forest Demon Deacons in the first game and proceeded to go 4-11 for 31 yards and 2 interceptions. Freeman was later replaced as starting quarterback by true freshman (and future Heisman Trophy winner) Robert Griffin.

== Professional career ==
=== San Francisco 49ers ===
After going undrafted in the 2009 NFL draft, Freeman signed with the San Francisco 49ers as an undrafted free agent on April 30. The 49ers waived Freeman on May 13.

== Life after football ==
Kirby, his wife Andrea, daughter Conley, son Knox live in Hollywood Park, Texas.
