= Boston College Eagles football statistical leaders =

The Boston College Eagles football statistical leaders are individual statistical leaders of the Boston College Eagles football program in various categories, including passing, rushing, receiving, total offense, defensive stats, and kicking. Within those areas, the lists identify single-game, single-season, and career leaders. The Eagles represent Boston College in the NCAA's Atlantic Coast Conference.

Although Boston College began competing in intercollegiate football in 1893, the school's official record book does not generally lists records from before the 1950s, as records from before this decade are often incomplete and inconsistent.

These lists are dominated by more recent players for several reasons:

- Since the 1950s, seasons have increased from 10 games to 11 and then 12 games in length.
- The NCAA didn't allow freshmen to play varsity football until 1972 (with the exception of the World War II years), allowing players to have four-year careers.
- Bowl games only began counting toward single-season and career statistics in 2002. The Eagles have played in 12 bowl games since this decision, allowing many recent players an extra game to accumulate statistics.

These lists are updated through the end of the 2025 season.

== Passing ==
=== Passing yards ===
Career
Rk	Player	Yards	Years
1	Doug Flutie	10,579	1981 1982 1983 1984
2	Glenn Foley	10,039	1990 1991 1992 1993
3	Matt Ryan	9,313	2004 2005 2006 2007
4	Chase Rettig	8,263	2010 2011 2012 2013
5	Brian St. Pierre	5,837	1999 2000 2001 2002
6	Shawn Halloran	5,252	1983 1984 1985 1986
7	Phil Jurkovec	5,183	2020 2021 2022
8	Anthony Brown	4,738	2017 2018 2019
9	Frank Harris	4,555	1968 1969 1970
10	Matt Hasselbeck	4,548	1994 1995 1996 1997

Single season
Rk	Player	Yards	Year
1	Matt Ryan	4,507	2007
2	Doug Flutie	3,454	1984
3	Glenn Foley	3,397	1993
4	Chase Rettig	3,065	2012
5	Brian St. Pierre	2,983	2002
6	Matt Ryan	2,942	2006
7	Shawn Halloran	2,935	1985
8	Doug Flutie	2,749	1982
9	Doug Flutie	2,724	1983
10	Paul Peterson	2,594	2004

Single game
Rk	Player	Yards	Year	Opponent
1	Doug Flutie	520	1982	Penn State
	Dennis Grosel	520	2020	Virginia
3	Doug Flutie	472	1984	Miami
4	Shawn Halloran	453	1985	Syracuse
5	Glenn Foley	448	1993	Virginia Tech
6	Doug Flutie	447	1984	Penn State
7	Chase Rettig	441	2012	Miami
8	Matt Ryan	435	2007	Georgia Tech
9	Chris Crane	428	2008	NC State
10	Glenn Foley	423	1993	Syracuse

=== Passing touchdowns ===
Career
Rk	Player	TDs	Years
1	Glenn Foley	72	1990 1991 1992 1993
2	Doug Flutie	67	1981 1982 1983 1984
3	Matt Ryan	56	2004 2005 2006 2007
4	Chase Rettig	52	2010 2011 2012 2013
5	Brian St. Pierre	48	1999 2000 2001 2002
6	Frank Harris	44	1968 1969 1970
7	Anthony Brown	40	2017 2018 2019
8	Phil Jurkovec	35	2020 2021 2022
9	Thomas Castellanos	33	2023 2024
10	Shawn Halloran	30	1983 1984 1985 1986

Single season
Rk	Player	TDs	Year
1	Matt Ryan	31	2007
2	Doug Flutie	27	1984
3	Glenn Foley	25	1993
	Brian St. Pierre	25	2001
5	Glenn Foley	21	1991
6	Anthony Brown	20	2018
7	Frank Harris	19	1969
8	Brian St. Pierre	18	2002
	Paul Peterson	18	2004
	Thomas Castellanos	18	2024

Single game
Rk	Player	TDs	Year	Opponent
1	Doug Flutie	6	1984	North Carolina

== Rushing ==
=== Rushing yards ===
Career
Rk	Player	Yards	Years
1	A. J. Dillon	4,382	2017 2018 2019
2	Andre Williams	3,739	2010 2011 2012 2013
3	Montel Harris	3,735	2008 2009 2010 2011
4	Derrick Knight	3,725	2000 2001 2002 2003
5	Mike Cloud	3,597	1995 1996 1997 1998
6	Troy Stradford	3,504	1982 1983 1984 1985 1986
7	William Green	2,974	1999 2000 2001
8	Andre Callender	2,971	2004 2005 2006 2007
9	Mike Esposito	2,759	1972 1973 1974
10	L. V. Whitworth	2,576	2004 2005 2006 2007

Single season
Rk	Player	Yards	Year
1	Andre Williams	2,177	2013
2	Mike Cloud	1,726	1998
3	Derrick Knight	1,721	2003
4	A. J. Dillon	1,685	2019
5	A. J. Dillon	1,589	2017
6	William Green	1,559	2001
7	Montel Harris	1,457	2009
8	Derrick Knight	1,432	2002
9	Chuckie Dukes	1,387	1992
10	Mike Esposito	1,289	1973

Single game
Rk	Player	Yards	Year	Opponent
1	Andre Williams	339	2013	NC State
2	Andre Williams	295	2013	New Mexico State
3	A. J. Dillon	272	2017	Louisville
4	Montel Harris	264	2009	NC State
5	Andre Williams	263	2013	Maryland
	Andre Williams	263	2013	Army
7	Phil Bennett	253	1972	Temple
8	Rolandan Finch	243	2011	Maryland
9	A. J. Dillon	242	2019	Syracuse
10	Troy Stradford	240	1986	Army

=== Rushing touchdowns ===
Career
Rk	Player	TDs	Years
1	A. J. Dillon	38	2017 2018 2019
2	Keith Barnette	34	1973 1974 1975
3	William Green	33	1999 2000 2001
4	Andre Williams	28	2010 2011 2012 2013
5	Troy Stradford	27	1982 1983 1984 1985 1986
	Darnell Campbell	27	1991 1992 1993
	Montel Harris	27	2008 2009 2010 2011
8	Mike Cloud	25	1995 1996 1997 1998
	Derrick Knight	25	2000 2001 2002 2003
10	Mike Esposito	24	1972 1973 1974

Single season
Rk	Player	TDs	Year
1	Keith Barnette	22	1974
2	Darnell Campbell	19	1993
3	Andre Williams	18	2013
4	Mike Esposito	15	1973
	William Green	15	2001
6	Mike Cloud	14	1998
	William Green	14	2000
	Montel Harris	14	2009
	A. J. Dillon	14	2017
	A. J. Dillon	14	2019

Single game
Rk	Player	TDs	Year	Opponent
1	Montel Harris	5	2009	NC State
	Andre Williams	5	2013	Army
3	Chuck Darling	4	1924	Marquette
	Ceslaus Antos	4	1928	Manhattan
	Al Cannava	4	1949	Holy Cross
	Ed Petela	4	1949	Holy Cross
	Tom Magnarelli	4	1954	Holy Cross
	Dave Bennett	4	1968	Buffalo
	Phil Bennett	4	1973	Massachusetts
	Keith Barnette	4	1974	West Virginia
	Glen Capriola	4	1975	Army
	Darnell Campbell	4	1993	Temple
	Thomas Castellanos	4	2023	Army

== Receiving ==
=== Receptions ===
Career
Rk	Player	Rec	Years
1	Lewis Bond	214	2021 2022 2023 2024 2025
2	Zay Flowers	200	2019 2020 2021 2022
3	Alex Amidon	191	2010 2011 2012 2013
4	Pete Mitchell	190	1991 1992 1993 1994
5	Rich Gunnell	181	2006 2007 2008 2009
6	Mark Chmura	164	1988 1989 1990 1991
7	Brandon Robinson	141	2005 2006 2007 2008
8	Tom Waddle	139	1985 1986 1987 1988
9	Andre Callender	138	2004 2005 2006 2007
10	Grant Adams	137	2001 2002 2003 2004

Single season
Rk	Player	Rec	Year
1	Lewis Bond	89	2025
2	Alex Amidon	78	2012
	Zay Flowers	78	2022
4	Alex Amidon	77	2013
5	Andre Callender	76	2007
6	Tom Waddle	70	1988
7	Lewis Bond	67	2024
8	Brian Brennan	66	1983
	Pete Mitchell	66	1993
10	Gerard Phelan	64	1984
	Rich Gunnell	64	2007

Single game
Rk	Player	Rec	Year	Opponent
1	Tom Waddle	13	1988	TCU
	Pete Mitchell	13	1993	Notre Dame
	Andre Callender	13	2007	Virginia Tech
	Alex Amidon	13	2013	Villanova
5	Luke Urban	12	1919	Rutgers
	Brian Brennan	12	1983	Penn State
	Grant Adams	12	2004	Pittsburgh

=== Receiving yards ===
Career
Rk	Player	Yards	Years
1	Zay Flowers	3,056	2019 2020 2021 2022
2	Alex Amidon	2,800	2010 2011 2012 2013
3	Rich Gunnell	2,459	2006 2007 2008 2009
4	Lewis Bond	2,402	2021 2022 2023 2024 2025
5	Pete Mitchell	2,388	1991 1992 1993 1994
6	Kelvin Martin	2,337	1983 1984 1985 1986
7	Brian Brennan	2,180	1980 1981 1982 1983
8	Mark Chmura	2,046	1988 1989 1990 1991
9	Grant Adams	2,036	2001 2002 2003 2004
10	Brandon Robinson	2,023	2005 2006 2007 2008

Single season
Rk	Player	Yards	Year
1	Alex Amidon	1,215	2012
2	Brian Brennan	1,149	1983
3	Zay Flowers	1,077	2022
4	Alex Amidon	1,032	2013
5	Lewis Bond	1,010	2025
6	Kelvin Martin	958	1985
7	Rich Gunnell	931	2007
8	Tom Waddle	902	1988
9	Zay Flowers	892	2020
10	Rich Gunnell	880	2009

Single game
Rk	Player	Yards	Year	Opponent
1	Scott Nizolek	229	1982	Penn State
2	Gerard Phelan	226	1984	Miami
3	Alex Amidon	193	2012	Clemson
4	Brian Brennan	185	1983	Temple
5	Dedrick Dewalt	183	2000	Pittsburgh
6	Zay Flowers	180	2020	Virginia
7	Rich Gunnell	179	2009	Notre Dame
8	Tom Waddle	174	1987	Rutgers
9	Brian Brennan	173	1983	Penn State
10	Kelvin Martin	172	1985	Pittsburgh

=== Receiving touchdowns ===
Career
Rk	Player	TDs	Years
1	Zay Flowers	29	2019 2020 2021 2022
2	Kelvin Martin	28	1983 1984 1985 1986
3	Pete Mitchell	20	1991 1992 1993 1994
	Dedrick Dewalt	20	1998 1999 2000 2001
5	Rich Gunnell	18	2006 2007 2008 2009
6	Jamal Burke	16	1999 2000 2001 2002
7	Alex Amidon	15	2010 2011 2012 2013
8	Brian Brennan	14	1980 1981 1982 1983
	Darren Flutie	14	1984 1985 1986 1987
	Grant Adams	14	2001 2002 2003 2004

Single season
Rk	Player	TDs	Year
1	Zay Flowers	12	2022
2	Kelvin Martin	10	1984
3	Kelvin Martin	9	1985
	Zay Flowers	9	2020
5	John Bonistalli	8	1969
	Mel Briggs	8	1972
	Brian Brennan	8	1983
	Kelvin Martin	8	1986
	Dedrick Dewalt	8	2000
	Jamal Burke	8	2001

Single game
Rk	Player	TDs	Year	Opponent
1	Jim Whalen	3	1962	Boston University
	John Bonistalli	3	1969	VMI
	George Gill	3	1970	Holy Cross
	Peter Laboy	3	1977	Army
	Kelvin Martin	3	1986	Holy Cross
	Zay Flowers	3	2020	Pittsburgh

== Total offense ==
Total offense is the sum of passing and rushing statistics. It does not include receiving or returns.

=== Total offense yards ===
Career
Rk	Player	Yards	Years
1	Doug Flutie	11,318	1981 1982 1983 1984
2	Glenn Foley	9,719	1990 1991 1992 1993
3	Matt Ryan	9,371	2004 2005 2006 2007
4	Chase Rettig	8,038	2010 2011 2012 2013
5	Brian St. Pierre	6,151	1999 2000 2001 2002
6	Phil Jurkovec	5,612	2020 2021 2022
7	Shawn Halloran	5,065	1983 1984 1985 1986
8	Thomas Castellanos	4,921	2023 2024
9	Frank Harris	4,529	1968 1969 1970
10	Matt Hasselbeck	4,366	1994 1995 1996 1997

Single season
Rk	Player	Yards	Year
1	Matt Ryan	4,509	2007
2	Doug Flutie	3,603	1984
3	Thomas Castellanos	3,361	2023
4	Glenn Foley	3,353	1993
5	Brian St. Pierre	3,109	2002
6	Doug Flutie	3,019	1982
7	Doug Flutie	2,965	1983
8	Chase Rettig	2,926	2012
9	Matt Ryan	2,907	2006
10	Shawn Halloran	2,828	1985

Single game
Rk	Player	Yards	Year	Opponent
1	Doug Flutie	517	1984	Miami
2	Doug Flutie	507	1982	Penn State
3	Dennis Grosel	493	2020	Virginia
4	Chris Crane	470	2008	NC State
5	Doug Flutie	464	1983	West Virginia
6	Shawn Halloran	447	1985	Syracuse
7	Matt Ryan	445	2007	Florida State
8	Glenn Foley	445	1993	Virginia Tech
9	Chase Rettig	439	2012	Miami
10	Matt Ryan	438	2007	Georgia Tech

=== Touchdowns responsible for ===
"Touchdowns responsible for" is the NCAA's official term for combined passing and rushing touchdowns.

Career
Rk	Player	TDs	Years
1	Doug Flutie	74	1981 1982 1983 1984
2	Glenn Foley	72	1990 1991 1992 1993
3	Matt Ryan	67	2004 2005 2006 2007
4	Chase Rettig	54	2010 2011 2012 2013
5	Brian St. Pierre	50	1999 2000 2001 2002
6	Frank Harris	48	1968 1969 1970

Single season
Rk	Player	TDs	Year
1	Matt Ryan	33	2007

== Defense ==
=== Interceptions ===
Career
Rk	Player	Ints	Years
1	Tony Thurman	25	1981 1982 1983 1984
2	John Salmon	17	1966 1967 1968
3	DeJuan Tribble	15	2004 2005 2006 2007

Single season
Rk	Player	Ints	Year
1	Tony Thurman	12	1984
2	Ed Clasby	8	1948
	John Salmon	8	1968
4	DeJuan Tribble	7	2006
	Hamp Cheevers	7	2018

Single game
Rk	Player	Ints	Year	Opponent
1	Harry Downes	3	1929	Boston University
	Bob Flanagan	3	1951	Georgia
	Hank Blaha	3	1963	Buffalo
	Jim King	3	1968	VMI
	Gary Dancewicz	3	1969	Tulane
	Ned Guillet	3	1973	Villanova
	Kelly Elias	3	1976	West Virginia
	Jim Budness	3	1979	Army
	Tony Thurman	3	1982	Holy Cross
	Tony Thurman	3	1984	Alabama
	Jason Pohopek	3	1990	Navy
	T. J. Stancil	3	2003	Colorado State
	DeJuan Tribble	3	2006	Miami
	DeJuan Tribble	3	2007	Wake Forest
	Jamie Silva	3	2007	Bowling Green

=== Tackles ===
Career
Rk	Player	Tackles	Years
1	Luke Kuechly	532	2009 2010 2011
2	Stephen Boyd	524	1991 1992 1993 1994
3	Matt Kelley	432	1987 1988 1989 1990
4	Ed Duran	429	1986 1987 1988 1989
5	Tom McManus	427	1989 1990 1991 1992
6	Josh Ott	381	2000 2001 2002 2003
7	Bill Romanowski	365	1985 1986 1987
8	Kevin Pierre-Louis	360	2010 2011 2012 2013
9	Kevin Pearson	360	1987 1988 1989 1990
10	Pedro Cirino	332	1996 1997 1998 1999

Single season
Rk	Player	Tackles	Year
1	Luke Kuechly	191	2011
2	Luke Kuechly	183	2010
3	Tom McManus	165	1991
4	Stephen Boyd	161	1993
5	Tom McManus	159	1992
6	Luke Kuechly	158	2009
7	Bill Romanowski	156	1987
8	Mike Saylor	151	1988
9	Nick Clancy	145	2012
10	Ed Duran	143	1988

Single game
Rk	Player	Tackles	Year	Opponent
1	Rich Scudellari	32	1977	Texas
2	Tom McManus	25	1991	Rutgers
	Stephen Boyd	25	1994	Virginia Tech
	Frank Chamberlin	25	1999	Syracuse
5	Nick Clancy	24	2012	Northwestern
6	Stephen Boyd	23	1993	Virginia Tech
	Luke Kuechly	23	2011	Duke
8	Tom McManus	22	1992	Syracuse
	Stephen Boyd	22	1993	Syracuse
10	Tom McManus	21	1992	Rutgers
	Luke Kuechly	21	2010	Duke

=== Sacks ===
Career
Rk	Player	Sacks	Years
1	Mathias Kiwanuka	37.5	2002 2003 2004 2005
2	Donovan Ezeiruaku	28.0	2021 2022 2023 2024
3	Mike Mamula	24.0	1992 1993 1994
4	Chris Hovan	20.5	1996 1997 1998 1999
5	Harold Landry	19.5	2014 2015 2016
6	Erik Storz	19.0	1994 1995 1996 1997
7	Sean Guthrie	18.5	1998 1999 2000 2001
8	Jason Pohopek	17.0	1989 1990 1991 1992
9	Stephen Boyd	17.0	1991 1992 1993 1994
10	Mike Willetts	15.0	1996 1997 1998 1999

Single season
Rk	Player	Sacks	Year
1	Donovan Ezeiruaku	16.5	2024
2	Harold Landry	15.0	2016
3	Mike Mamula	13.0	1994
	Erik Storz	13.0	1997
5	Mathias Kiwanuka	11.5	2003
	Mathias Kiwanuka	11.5	2004
7	Mike Mamula	11.0	1993
	Chris Hovan	11.0	1999
9	Eric Lindstrom	9.5	1986
	Mathias Kiwanuka	9.5	2005
	Kasim Edebali	9.5	2013

Single game
Rk	Player	Sacks	Year	Opponent
1	Mike Mamula	3.5	1994	Temple
	Mathias Kiwanuka	3.5	2005	NC State
	Donovan Ezeiruaku	3.5	2024	Pittsburgh
4	Joe Glandorf	3.0	1974	Syracuse
	Mike Mamula	3.0	1994	Syracuse
	Mathias Kiwanuka	3.0	2003	Notre Dame
	Mathias Kiwanuka	3.0	2005	Ball State
	B. J. Raji	3.0	2008	NC State
	Harold Landry	3.0	2016	Wagner
	Donovan Ezeiruaku	3.0	2024	Western Kentucky

== Kicking ==
=== Field goals made ===
Career
Rk	Player	FGs	Years
1	Nate Freese	70	2010 2011 2012 2013
2	Brian Lowe	57	1986 1987 1988 1989
3	Steve Aponavicius	47	2006 2007 2008 2009
4	Sandro Sciortino	46	2000 2001 2002 2003
5	John Matich	46	1996 1997 1998 1999
6	John Cooper	33	1979 1980 1981

Single season
Rk	Player	FGs	Year
1	Sandro Sciortino	23	2002
2	Nate Freese	20	2013
3	Nate Freese	22	2010
4	Brian Lowe	17	1986
5	John Cooper	16	1980
	John Matich	16	1996
	Aaron Boumerhi	16	2020
	Luca Lombardo	16	2025
9	Brian Lowe	15	1989

Single game
Rk	Player	FGs	Year	Opponent
1	Brian Lowe	4	1986	Army
	Brian Lowe	4	1986	West Virginia
	Brian Lowe	4	1989	Georgia Tech
	Steve Aponavicius	4	2009	Maryland
	Nate Freese	4	2010	Kent State
	Nate Freese	4	2010	Florida State
	Nate Freese	4	2011	Wake Forest
