= Rich Gunnell =

American football player and coach (born 1987)

Holy Cross Crusaders
- Title: Wide receivers coach & Pass game coordinator

Personal information
- Born: January 12, 1987 (age 39); East Windsor Township, New Jersey, U.S.
- Listed height: 5 ft 11 in (1.80 m)
- Listed weight: 197 lb (89 kg)

Career information
- High school: Notre Dame (Lawrence, New Jersey)
- College: Boston College
- NFL draft: 2010: undrafted

Career history

Playing
- Kansas City Chiefs (2010)*
- * Offseason or practice squad member only

Coaching
- Tufts (2011) Assistant defensive line coach; Boston College (2012–2013) Graduate assistant; Marian HS (MA) (2014–2015) Head coach; Boston College (2016–2019) Wide receivers coach; Boston College (2019) Interim head coach; Boston College (2020–2021) Running backs coach; Holy Cross (2022–present) Wide receivers coach & Pass game coordinator

Head coaching record
- Career: NCAA: 0–1 (.000)

Richard P. Gunnell (born January 12, 1987) is an American former football wide receiver. He was signed by the Kansas City Chiefs as an undrafted free agent in 2010. He played college football at Boston College. He is currently the wide receivers coach and pass game coordinator at the College of the Holy Cross.

== Early life ==
Gunnell is from East Windsor Township, New Jersey and was a standout at Notre Dame High School in Lawrenceville, New Jersey. In high school, he made 115 receptions for 2,200 yards and 38 touchdowns. He also returned three kickoffs and two punts for touchdowns. He played for head coach Chappy Moore, and was on the school's basketball and track teams.

== College career ==
Gunnell set the career receiving yard record at Boston College, surpassing Pete Mitchell's. Gunnell broke the record on a 61-yard touchdown catch in the second quarter of his final game against USC in the 2009 Emerald Bowl. He finished with 2,459 receiving yards in his career surpassing Mitchell's 2,388 yards. In his final collegiate game Gunnell he had 130 receiving yards and one touchdown on six catches. He was also the active leader in catches, receiving yards, and punt return touchdowns in the Atlantic Coast Conference.

Gunnell was voted the Eagles Most Valuable Player by his teammates, the first time a wide receiver captain received the honor since 1990. His "dream" is to play professionally and is awaiting an invitation to the NFL Combine. Gunnell was a senior team captain along with center Matt Tennant and middle linebacker Mike McLaughlin. Gunnell played under three head coaches start including Tom O'Brien and Frank Spaziani

Gunnell played with quarterbacks Matt Ryan, Dominique Davis, and Dave Shinskie. His best season statistically was as a sophomore with Ryan as quarterback when he had 64 receptions for 931 yards and 7 receiving touchdowns. His senior year with 25-year-old freshman Shinskie he caught 54 passes for 750 yards, and 6 touchdown, plus another 5 catches for 117 yards and a touchdown against USC in the Emerald Bowl.

== Professional career ==
On April 25, 2010, it was announced that Gunnell had signed with the Kansas City Chiefs. However, just prior to the start of the 2010 season on September 3, the Chiefs released Gunnell along with 6 other players vying for roster spots. Gunnell was the final cut for the Chiefs and was placed on the practice squad.

== Coaching career ==
Gunnell was a graduate assistant at Boston College, his alma mater. He coached at Marian High School in Framingham, Massachusetts, in 2014. Gunnell became the wide receivers coach for Boston College in the 2016 season. Gunnell was named interim head coach following the firing of Steve Addazio at the conclusion of the 2019 regular season. For the 2022 season, Gunnell joined the Holy Cross football coaching staff as the Wide receivers coach and Pass game coordinator.

== Head coaching record ==
=== College ===
Year	Team	Overall	Conference	Standing	Bowl/playoffs
Boston College Eagles (Atlantic Coast Conference) (2019)
2019	Boston College	0–1	0–0		L Birmingham
Boston College:		0–1	0–0		
Total:		0–1			
