= 2012 Boston College Eagles football team =

American college football season

2012 Boston College Eagles football
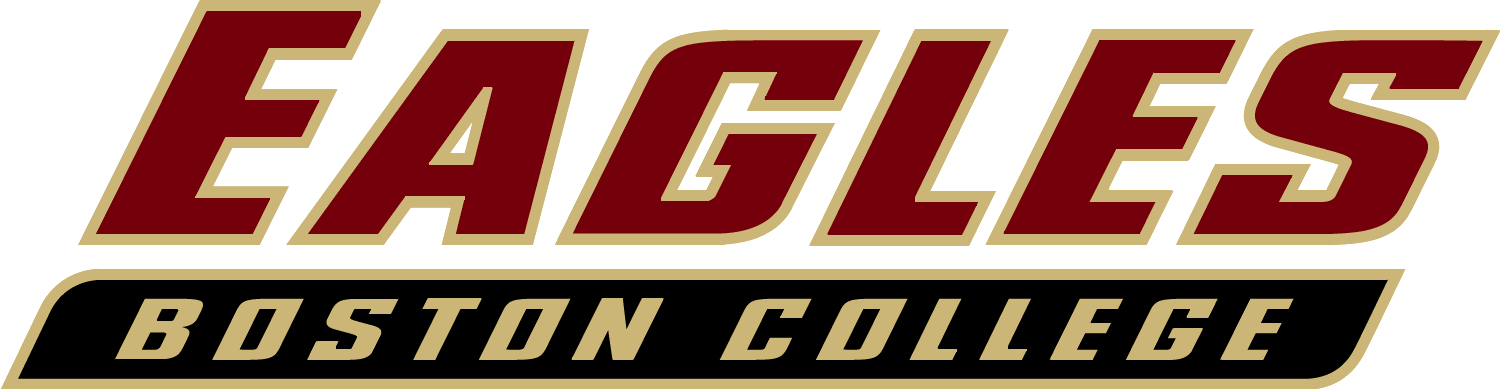
- Conference: Atlantic Coast Conference
- Atlantic Division
- Record: 2–10 (1–7 ACC)
- Head coach: Frank Spaziani (4th season)
- Offensive coordinator: Doug Martin (1st season)
- Offensive scheme: Air raid
- Defensive coordinator: Bill McGovern (4th season)
- Base defense: 4–3
- Captains: Emmett Cleary; Jim Noel; Chris Pantale; Kaleb Ramsey
- Home stadium: Alumni Stadium

2012 Atlantic Coast Conference football standings
	Conf.			Overall
Team	W		L	W		L
Atlantic Division
No. 10 Florida State xy$	7	–	1	12	–	2
No. 11 Clemson x	7	–	1	11	–	2
NC State	4	–	4	7	–	6
Wake Forest	3	–	5	5	–	7
Maryland	2	–	6	4	–	8
Boston College	1	–	7	2	–	10
Coastal Division
Georgia Tech xy	5	–	3	7	–	7
North Carolina†	5	–	3	8	–	4
Miami (FL)‡	5	–	3	7	–	5
Virginia Tech	4	–	4	7	–	6
Duke	3	–	5	6	–	7
Virginia	2	–	6	4	–	8
Championship: Florida State 21, Georgia Tech 15
$ – BCS representative as conference champion; x – Division champion/co-champions; y – Championship game participant; † North Carolina ineligible for ACC title, championship game, and bowl game due to NCAA sanctions. ‡ Miami ineligible for ACC title, championship game, and bowl game due to self-imposed sanctions.; Rankings from AP Poll

The 2012 Boston College Eagles football team represented Boston College as a member of the Atlantic Division of the Atlantic Coast Conference (ACC) in the 2012 NCAA Division I FBS football season. They were led by fourth-year head coach Frank Spaziani and played their home games at Alumni Stadium. Boston College finished the season 2–10 overall and 1–7 in ACC play to place last of six teams in Atlantic Division.

On November 25, Boston College's athletic director, Brad Bates, announced that Spaziani has been relieved of duties as head coach of the Eagles.

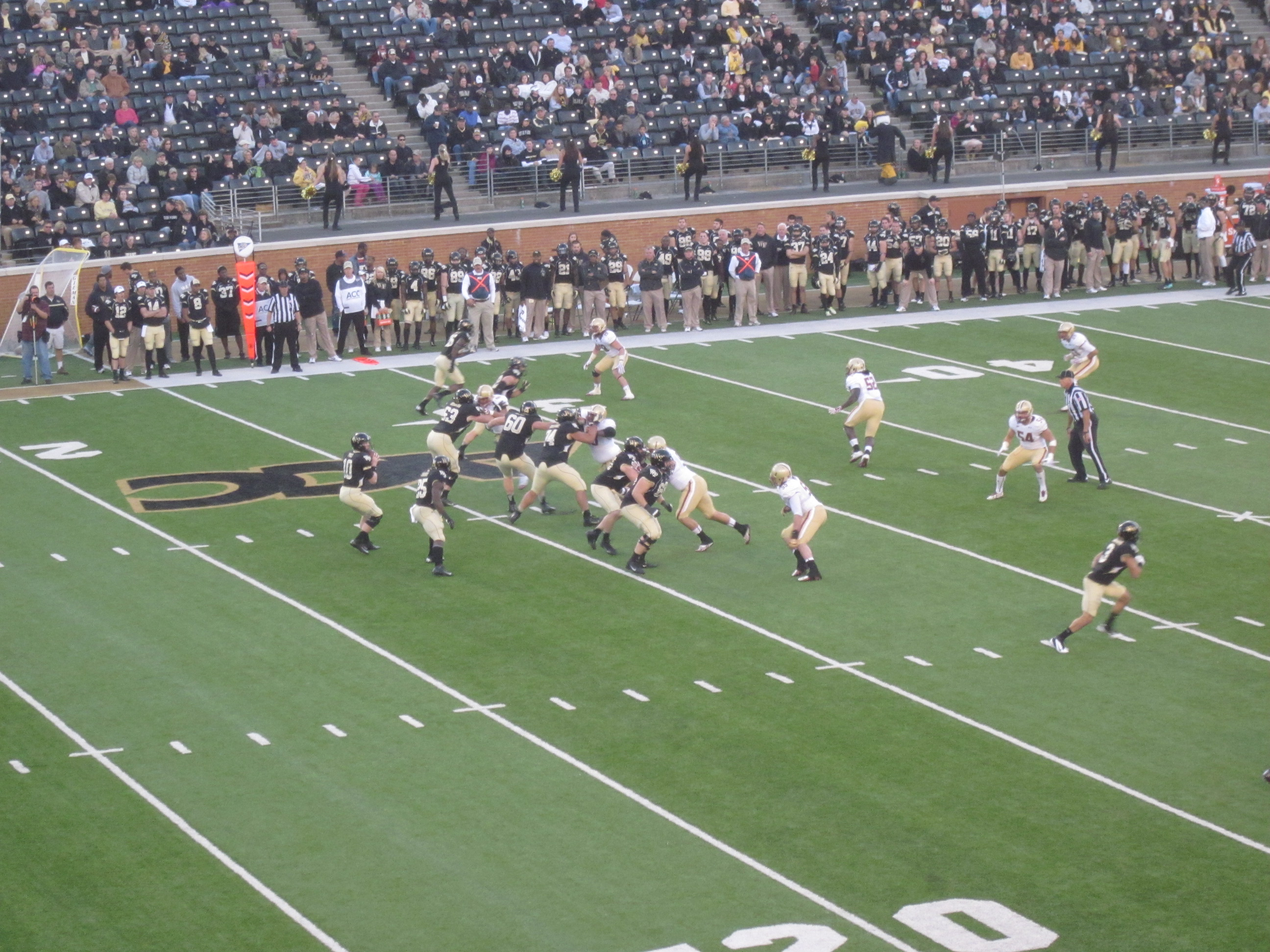
Boston College (in white) on defense versus Wake Forest (in black) during the November 3, 2012 game

== Schedule ==
Date	Time	Opponent	Site	TV	Result	Attendance
September 1	3:30 p.m.	Miami (FL)	Alumni Stadium; Chestnut Hill, MA	ABC/ESPN2	L 32–41	39,262
September 8	1:00 p.m.	Maine*	Alumni Stadium; Chestnut Hill, MA	ESPN3	W 34–3	30,685
September 15	3:30 p.m.	at Northwestern*	Ryan Field; Evanston, IL	BTN	L 13–22	32,597
September 29	3:30 p.m.	No. 17 Clemson	Alumni Stadium; Chestnut Hill, MA (O'Rourke–McFadden Trophy)	ESPN2	L 31–45	40,138
October 6	12:00 p.m.	at Army*	Michie Stadium; West Point, NY	CBSSN	L 31–34	39,492
October 13	5:30 p.m.	at No. 12 Florida State	Doak Campbell Stadium; Tallahassee, FL	ESPN2	L 7–51	81,075
October 20	3:00 p.m.	at Georgia Tech	Bobby Dodd Stadium; Atlanta, GA	ACC RSN	L 17–37	40,112
October 27	1:00 p.m.	Maryland	Alumni Stadium; Chestnut Hill, MA	ESPN3	W 20–17	33,267
November 3	3:30 p.m.	at Wake Forest	BB&T Field; Winston-Salem, NC	ACC RSN	L 14–28	28,963
November 10	8:00 p.m.	No. 4 Notre Dame*	Alumni Stadium; Chestnut Hill, MA (Holy War)	ABC	L 6–21	44,500
November 17	12:30 p.m.	Virginia Tech	Alumni Stadium; Chestnut Hill, MA (rivalry)	ACCN	L 23–30 ^{OT}	34,266
November 24	3:00 p.m.	at NC State	Carter–Finley Stadium; Raleigh, NC	ESPN3	L 10–27	53,020
*Non-conference game; Rankings from AP Poll released prior to the game; All times are in Eastern time

== Game summaries ==
=== Miami (FL) ===
	1	2	3	4	Total
Hurricanes	14	7	10	10	41
Eagles	14	6	3	9	32

Statistics	MIA	BC
First downs	22	29
Total yards	415	537
Rushing yards	208	96
Passing yards	207	441
Turnovers	1	3
Time of possession	26:21	33:39

Team	Category	Player	Statistics
Miami	Passing	Stephen Morris	28/45, 207 yards, TD, INT
Miami	Rushing	Duke Johnson	7 rushes, 135 yards, 2 TD
Miami	Receiving	Allen Hurns	8 receptions, 81 yards
Boston College	Passing	Chase Rettig	32/51, 441 yards, 2 TD, INT
Boston College	Rushing	Andre Williams	18 rushes, 49 yards, TD
Boston College	Receiving	Alex Amidon	10 receptions, 149 yards

=== Maine ===
	1	2	3	4	Total
Black Bears	3	0	0	0	3
Eagles	0	17	17	0	34

Statistics	MAINE	BC
First downs	12	22
Total yards	203	390
Rushing yards	69	166
Passing yards	134	224
Turnovers	3	2
Time of possession	30:20	29:40

Team	Category	Player	Statistics
Maine	Passing	Marcus Wasilewski	20/42, 134 yards, 2 INT
Maine	Rushing	David Hood	21 rushes, 64 yards
Maine	Receiving	Maurice McDonald	6 receptions, 37 yards
Boston College	Passing	Chase Rettig	16/32, 219 yards, 3 TD
Boston College	Rushing	Rolandan Finch	17 rushes, 90 yards
Boston College	Receiving	Alex Amidon	6 receptions, 99 yards, TD

=== At Northwestern ===
	1	2	3	4	Total
Eagles	3	7	0	3	13
Wildcats	6	6	3	7	22

Statistics	BC	NW
First downs	22	34
Total yards	321	575
Rushing yards	30	303
Passing yards	291	272
Turnovers	1	2
Time of possession	24:04	35:56

Team	Category	Player	Statistics
Boston College	Passing	Chase Rettig	24/44, 291 yards, TD
Boston College	Rushing	Rolandan Finch	8 rushes, 19 yards
Boston College	Receiving	Alex Amidon	9 receptions, 118 yards
Northwestern	Passing	Kain Colter	16/20, 144 yards
Northwestern	Rushing	Mike Trumpy	16 rushes, 106 yards, TD
Northwestern	Receiving	Demetrius Fields	9 receptions, 77 yards

=== No. 17 Clemson ===
	1	2	3	4	Total
No. 17 Tigers	10	14	14	7	45
Eagles	7	14	7	3	31

Statistics	CLEM	BC
First downs	27	18
Total yards	576	420
Rushing yards	209	51
Passing yards	367	369
Turnovers	2	2
Time of possession	28:47	31:13

Team	Category	Player	Statistics
Clemson	Passing	Tajh Boyd	28/38, 367 yards, 3 TD, INT
Clemson	Rushing	Andre Ellington	25 rushes, 132 yards, TD
Clemson	Receiving	DeAndre Hopkins	11 receptions, 197 yards, TD
Boston College	Passing	Chase Rettig	25/43, 341 yards, 3 TD, 2 INT
Boston College	Rushing	Andre Williams	22 rushes, 61 yards, TD
Boston College	Receiving	Alex Amidon	8 receptions, 193 yards, 2 TD

=== At Army ===
	1	2	3	4	Total
Eagles	7	17	0	7	31
Black Knights	14	3	7	10	34

Statistics	BC	ARMY
First downs	17	31
Total yards	420	595
Rushing yards	186	516
Passing yards	234	79
Turnovers	1	2
Time of possession	22:22	37:38

Team	Category	Player	Statistics
Boston College	Passing	Chase Rettig	16/29, 234 yards, TD
Boston College	Rushing	Andre Williams	21 rushes, 191 yards, 2 TD
Boston College	Receiving	Alex Amidon	5 receptions, 85 yards, TD
Army	Passing	Trent Steelman	5/12, 79 yards
Army	Rushing	Raymond Johnson-Maples	34 rushes, 184 yards
Army	Receiving	Patrick Laird	3 receptions, 42 yards

=== At No. 12 Florida State ===
	1	2	3	4	Total
Eagles	0	7	0	0	7
No. 12 Seminoles	14	17	10	10	51

Statistics	BC	FSU
First downs	18	30
Total yards	230	654
Rushing yards	96	201
Passing yards	134	453
Turnovers	1	2
Time of possession	30:33	29:27

Team	Category	Player	Statistics
Boston College	Passing	Chase Rettig	15/31, 122 yards, TD, INT
Boston College	Rushing	Andre Williams	20 rushes, 104 yards
Boston College	Receiving	Bobby Swigert	5 receptions, 61 yards, TD
Florida State	Passing	EJ Manuel	27/34, 439 yards, 4 TD, 2 INT
Florida State	Rushing	Devonta Freeman	8 rushes, 70 yards
Florida State	Receiving	Kenny Shaw	2 receptions, 125 yards, TD

=== At Georgia Tech ===
	1	2	3	4	Total
Eagles	0	3	6	8	17
Yellow Jackets	7	21	3	6	37

Statistics	BC	GT
First downs	15	30
Total yards	296	563
Rushing yards	32	391
Passing yards	264	172
Turnovers	2	0
Time of possession	16:15	43:45

Team	Category	Player	Statistics
Boston College	Passing	Chase Rettig	19/31, 264 yards, 2 TD, INT
Boston College	Rushing	Andre Williams	11 rushes, 51 yards
Boston College	Receiving	Alex Amidon	7 receptions, 118 yards, TD
Georgia Tech	Passing	Vad Lee	2/6, 89 yards, TD
Georgia Tech	Rushing	Zach Laskey	17 rushes, 101 yards
Georgia Tech	Receiving	B. J. Bostic	2 receptions, 66 yards

=== Maryland ===
	1	2	3	4	Total
Terrapins	0	0	10	7	17
Eagles	7	3	3	7	20

Statistics	MD	BC
First downs	16	17
Total yards	347	295
Rushing yards	107	8
Passing yards	240	287
Turnovers	3	2
Time of possession	33:27	26:33

Team	Category	Player	Statistics
Maryland	Passing	Caleb Rowe	23/42, 240 yards, 2 TD, 3 INT
Maryland	Rushing	Wes Brown	23 rushes, 73 yards
Maryland	Receiving	Stefon Diggs	11 receptions, 152 yards, TD
Boston College	Passing	Chase Rettig	21/39, 287 yards, 2 TD
Boston College	Rushing	Andre Williams	16 rushes, 60 yards
Boston College	Receiving	Alex Amidon	9 receptions, 137 yards

=== At Wake Forest ===
	1	2	3	4	Total
Eagles	0	7	7	0	14
Demon Deacons	14	7	7	0	28

Statistics	BC	WAKE
First downs	22	22
Total yards	381	409
Rushing yards	12	116
Passing yards	369	293
Turnovers	4	1
Time of possession	25:14	34:46

Team	Category	Player	Statistics
Boston College	Passing	Chase Rettig	29/49, 357 yards, TD, 3 INT
Boston College	Rushing	David Dudeck	14 rushes, 32 yards
Boston College	Receiving	Alex Amidon	10 receptions, 130 yards, TD
Wake Forest	Passing	Tanner Price	39/57, 293 yards, 3 TD, INT
Wake Forest	Rushing	Josh Harris	17 rushes, 84 yards, TD
Wake Forest	Receiving	Michael Campanaro	16 receptions, 123 yards, 3 TD

=== No. 4 Notre Dame ===
	1	2	3	4	Total
No. 4 Fighting Irish	7	7	7	0	21
Eagles	0	3	0	3	6

Statistics	ND	BC
First downs	21	20
Total yards	393	305
Rushing yards	184	53
Passing yards	209	252
Turnovers	2	2
Time of possession	32:23	27:37

Team	Category	Player	Statistics
Notre Dame	Passing	Everett Golson	16/24, 200 yards, 2 TD
Notre Dame	Rushing	Theo Riddick	18 rushes, 104 yards
Notre Dame	Receiving	Tyler Eifert	6 receptions, 67 yards
Boston College	Passing	Chase Rettig	27/43, 247 yards, INT
Boston College	Rushing	Rolandan Finch	7 rushes, 40 yards
Boston College	Receiving	Alex Amidon	6 receptions, 84 yards

=== Virginia Tech ===
	1	2	3	4	OT	Total
Hokies	3	0	14	6	7	30
Eagles	3	10	0	10	0	23

Statistics	VT	BC
First downs	18	20
Total yards	401	296
Rushing yards	154	167
Passing yards	247	129
Turnovers	0	1
Time of possession	30:04	29:56

Team	Category	Player	Statistics
Virginia Tech	Passing	Logan Thomas	16/33, 247 yards, 2 TD
Virginia Tech	Rushing	Tony Gregory	14 rushes, 69 yards
Virginia Tech	Receiving	Marcus Davis	5 receptions, 104 yards, TD
Boston College	Passing	Chase Rettig	13/30, 129 yards, TD, INT
Boston College	Rushing	Rolandan Finch	26 rushes, 133 yards
Boston College	Receiving	Rolandan Finch	5 receptions, 53 yards

=== At NC State ===
	1	2	3	4	Total
Eagles	3	0	7	0	10
Wolfpack	0	14	13	0	27

Statistics	BC	NCST
First downs	17	17
Total yards	327	376
Rushing yards	204	131
Passing yards	123	245
Turnovers	3	1
Time of possession	26:50	33:10

Team	Category	Player	Statistics
Boston College	Passing	Chase Rettig	16/45, 123 yards, 3 INT
Boston College	Rushing	Rolandan Finch	19 rushes, 144 yards, TD
Boston College	Receiving	Johnathan Coleman	2 receptions, 35 yards
NC State	Passing	Mike Glennon	27/41, 245 yards, 3 TD
NC State	Rushing	Shadrach Thornton	28 rushes, 105 yards
NC State	Receiving	Quintin Payton	4 receptions, 68 yards, TD

== Roster ==
2012 Boston College Eagles football team roster
Players
Coaches
Offense

Pos.	#	Name	Class
WR	1	Colin Larmond Jr.	Sr
WR	2	Nigel Matthews	Fr
WR	3	Harrison Jackson	Fr
WR	4	Donte Elliott	Sr
WR	7	Spiffy Evans	So
QB	8	Josh Bordner	So
QB	9	Shane Cranmore	So
WR	10	Bobby Swigert	Jr
QB	11	Chase Rettig	Jr
QB	13	Christian Suntrup	Fr
WR	14	Johnathan Coleman	Jr
QB	15	Dave Shinskie	Sr
QB	16	Mike Marscovetra	Sr
TE, WR	18	Dan Crimmins	Fr
QB	19	Austin Lommen	Fr
RB	20	Tahj Kimble	So
RB	28	Rolandan Finch	Jr
WR	33	Jeffrey Jay	So
WR	35	Joe LaCorte Jr.	Sr
WR, DB	36	Griff Rogan	So
RB	37	George Craan	Fr
RB	38	Paul Maglio	Sr
RB	39	Mike Javorski	Sr
FB	41	Jake Sinkovec	Jr
TE	43	Carmen Iacono	So
RB	44	Andre Williams	Jr
TE	46	Dave Bowen	Fr
OT	73	John Wetzel	Sr
OT	77	Emmett Cleary	Sr
OL	79	Paul Gaughan	So
TE, WR	80	Brian Miller	So
TE	81	Chris Pantale	Sr

Defense

Pos.	#	Name	Class
DB	5	Al Louis-Jean	So
DB	6	C. J. Jones	So
DB	9	Dominique Williams	So
DB	17	Bryce Jones	Fr
DB	19	Sean Sylvia	So
DB	21	Manuel Asprilla	So
DB	23	Jim Noel	Sr
LB	24	Kevin Pierre-Louis	Jr
DB	25	Josh Keyes	So
SS	26	David Dudeck	Fr
DB	27	Justin Simmons	Fr
DB	29	James McCaffrey	So
DB	30	Mike Strizak	Fr
LB	33	Tim Joy	Fr
LB	34	Sean Duggan	So
LB	35	Andre Lawrence	Jr
LB	36	Bobby Wolford	Fr
DB	37	Zach Wolfe	Fr
DB	38	Ted Davenport	So
DB	43	Ameer Richardson	Fr
DE	45	Mehdi Abdesmad	So
LB	46	Sean Burke	Fr
DB	47	Spenser Rositano	So
LB	48	Nick Lifta	Fr
LB	49	Steele Divitto	Jr
DL	55	Kieran Borcich	So
DL	90	Connor Wujciak	So
DE	91	Kasim Edebali	Jr
DT	93	Bryan Murray	Sr
DL	95	Dominic Appiah	So
DT	96	Kaleb Ramsey	Sr
DL	99	Brian Mihalik	So

Special teams

Pos.	#	Name	Class
K	30	Joey Launceford	Fr
P	32	Gerald Levano	Sr
K, P	42	Alex Howell	Fr
K	48	Jake Wilhelm	Fr
LS	53	Leonard Skubal	Fr
LS	57	Sean Flaherty	Sr
LS	61	A. J. Caruso	Fr
K	85	Nate Freese	Jr

Head coach

- Frank Spaziani

Coordinators/assistant coaches

- Doug Martin
  Offensive coordinator/Quarterbacks
- Bill McGovern
  Defensive coordinator/Linebackers
- Jim Bollman
  Offensive line
- Sean Devine
  Tight ends

Legend

- (C) Team captain
- (S) Suspended
- (I) Ineligible
- Injured
- Redshirt

Roster
