= 2007 ACC Championship Game =

2007 Dr. Pepper ACC Championship Game
- Conference Championship
Virginia Tech Hokies	Boston College Eagles
(10–2)	(10–2)
30	16
Head coach: Frank Beamer	Head coach: Jeff Jagodzinski
AP / Coaches / BCS; 6 / 5 / 6	AP / Coaches / BCS; 12 / 12 / 11
	1	2	3	4	Total
Virginia Tech	0	16	0	14	30
Boston College	7	9	0	0	16
- Date: December 1, 2007
- Season: 2007
- Stadium: Jacksonville Municipal Stadium
- Location: Jacksonville, Florida
- MVP: QB Sean Glennon, Virginia Tech
- Favorite: Virginia Tech by 5
- Referee: Jack Childress
- Halftime show: Dr Pepper "Million Dollar Throw"
- Attendance: 53,212

United States TV coverage
- Network: ABC
- Announcers: Brad Nessler, Bob Griese, Paul Maguire and Bonnie Bernstein
- Nielsen ratings: 4.1

2007 Atlantic Coast Conference football standings
	Conf.			Overall
Team	W		L	W		L
Atlantic Division
No. 10 Boston College x	6	–	2	11	–	3
No. 21 Clemson	5	–	3	9	–	4
Wake Forest	5	–	3	9	–	4
Florida State	4	–	4	7	–	6
Maryland	3	–	5	6	–	7
NC State	3	–	5	5	–	7
Coastal Division
No. 9 Virginia Tech x$	7	–	1	11	–	3
Virginia	6	–	2	9	–	4
Georgia Tech	4	–	4	7	–	6
North Carolina	3	–	5	4	–	8
Miami (FL)	2	–	6	5	–	7
Duke	0	–	8	1	–	11
Championship: Virginia Tech 30, Boston College 16
$ – BCS representative as conference champion; % – BCS at-large representative; x – Division champion/co-champions; Rankings from AP Poll

The 2007 Dr. Pepper ACC Championship Game featured the Boston College Eagles and the Virginia Tech Hokies in a regular-season college football game that determined the conference's champion for the 2007 season. Virginia Tech defeated Boston College 30–16 to win the ACC football championship. The game, held at Jacksonville Municipal Stadium in Jacksonville, Florida, was a rematch of a regular-season game that took place on October 25, in Blacksburg, Virginia. In that game, Boston College, courtesy of a late-game comeback by quarterback Matt Ryan, won 14–10.

Following the loss, Virginia Tech won five straight games to win the Coastal Division of the ACC, while Boston College stumbled, losing two games before defeating the Clemson Tigers to win the Atlantic Division and representation in the Championship Game. Most pre-game media coverage of the event cast the game as an opportunity for Virginia Tech to avenge its earlier loss. In addition, the winner of the game would be awarded an automatic bid to the Bowl Championship Series 2008 Orange Bowl game in Miami, Florida on January 3, 2008. Despite Boston College's earlier win over Virginia Tech, spread bettors favored Virginia Tech by five points.

In the opening quarter of the game, the Eagles took a 7–0 lead on a 51-yard fumble return for a touchdown. The Eagles' offense dominated the first half of the game statistically, but failed to add to its early lead until the second quarter, when a field goal made it 10–0. Virginia Tech answered with a touchdown of their own, but Boston College responded with a seven-play, 74-yard touchdown drive of its own. Then came perhaps the most pivotal play of the game. During the extra point kick following the Boston College touchdown, Virginia Tech's Duane Brown blocked the kick, which was caught by the Hokies' cornerback Brandon Flowers, who returned it 75 yards for a defensive two-point conversion.

The play changed the momentum of the game. Virginia Tech added a tying touchdown before halftime, and after a scoreless third quarter, two Matt Ryan interceptions resulted in 14 points for Virginia Tech and a 30–16 Virginia Tech win. With the victory, the Hokies earned their second Atlantic Coast Conference football championship in four years and their first Orange Bowl bid since 1996.

== Background ==
The ACC Championship Game matches the winner of the Coastal and Atlantic Divisions of the Atlantic Coast Conference. A conference championship game was added in 2005, as a result of the league's expansion the previous year, adding former Big East members Miami, Virginia Tech, and Boston College. With the addition of Boston College, the ACC consisted of 12 teams, allowing it to hold a conference championship game under NCAA rules.

Florida State defeated Virginia Tech, 27–22 in the first ACC Championship game. The following year, the game, held in Jacksonville, Florida, pitted Wake Forest against Georgia Tech, with Wake Forest winning 9–6. Before the 2007 season began, most sports writers and pollsters predicted Florida State would win the Atlantic Division while Virginia Tech would win the Coastal Division, setting up a rematch of the 2005 ACC Championship Game.

In October, Florida State lost back-to-back ACC conference games to Wake Forest and Miami, eliminating them from contention for their division title. Boston College, which had finished second in the preseason Atlantic Division poll, was ranked No. 2 in the country after Florida State's loss to Miami. Virginia Tech, which suffered a 48–7 defeat at the hands of then-No. 2 LSU, nevertheless remained at the top of the Coastal Division standings as the Eagles passed the Seminoles for the Atlantic Division lead.

On October 25, Boston College traveled to Blacksburg, Virginia, home of Virginia Tech, for a Thursday night game broadcast on ESPN. In heavy rain, Virginia Tech's defense dominated for most of the game. As time ran down, however, Boston College quarterback Matt Ryan orchestrated two late-game touchdown drives, scoring 14 points in the final 2 minutes to win 14–10. The victory seemingly sealed Boston College's route to a national championship game, while the loss potentially jeopardized Virginia Tech's chances of being selected to play in the ACC Championship Game. Over the next two weeks, however, Boston College was upset by Florida State and Maryland. The Eagles rallied to win their final two games—against Miami and Clemson—to clinch the division title. Virginia Tech, meanwhile, was undefeated through the remainder of its schedule, including a division-clinching win over its archrival, Virginia. This meant the ACC Championship Game in Jacksonville would be a rematch between these two division champions.

== Pre-game buildup ==
In the weeks leading up to the game, there was much media discussion of the future site of the game due to Jacksonville's expiring contract to host the ACC Championship. The media also discussed whether Virginia Tech would be out for revenge against Boston College after its last-second defeat in Blacksburg on October 25. Despite its previous loss, spread bettors favored Virginia Tech to win the game, with most favoring the Hokies by 4.5–5 points.

The game was the 15th contest between Boston College and Virginia Tech and was their second of the 2007 season. The first meeting, which took place in 1993 in the Big East conference, resulted in a 48–34 Boston College win. Between 1993 and 2003, Boston College and Virginia Tech played annually as part of their conference schedules. The teams did not meet in 2004 following Virginia Tech's move to the Atlantic Coast Conference. When Boston College followed in 2005, the schools resumed meeting during the regular season, playing in 2005, 2006, and 2007.

=== Off-field issues ===
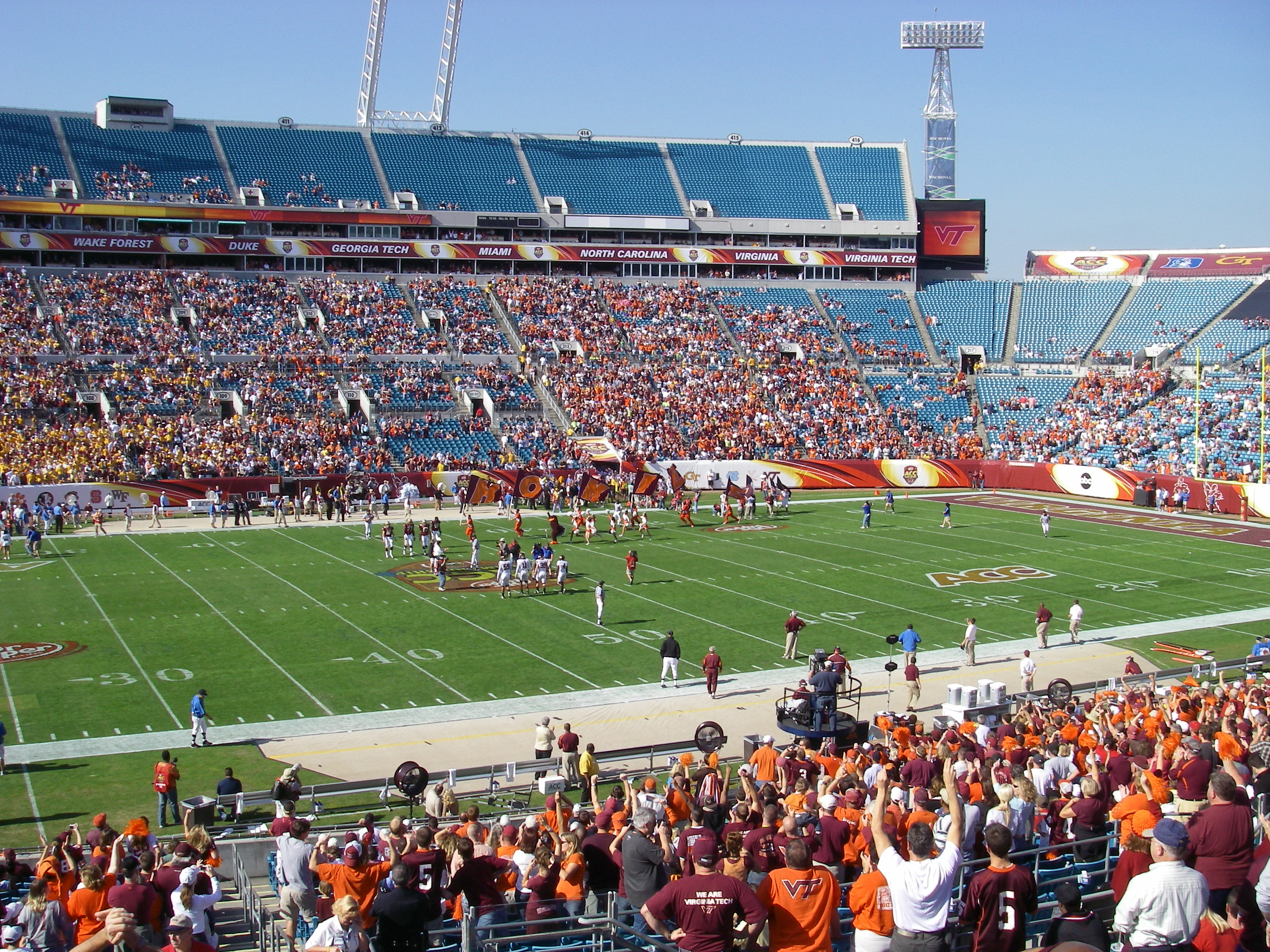
The stands at Jacksonville Municipal Stadium were largely empty as the two captains entered the center for the toss and remained so for the rest of the game.

Following the 2006 ACC Championship Game, the Gator Bowl Association, which administered the ACC Championship Game during its first two years of existence, was awarded a one-year extension to its two-year contract to host the game. The 2006 game suffered from poor attendance, resulting in over $1 million in losses for the Gator Bowl Association. In the off-season, the Gator Bowl Association declared that if sales did not improve for the 2007 ACC Championship game, the game's Jacksonville future would be in jeopardy. Attendance for the 2006 game was low due to high travel costs stemming from Jacksonville's distance from the participating schools, and the 2007 participants—Boston College and Virginia Tech—faced the same problem.

With Jacksonville's future as host in doubt, representatives from Charlotte, North Carolina, Tampa, Florida, and Jacksonville visited the ACC offices to lobby to host the 2008 game. Orlando, Florida, which had been an early contender to host the 2008 game, was eliminated from consideration before the meetings took place. As kickoff drew closer, the Gator Bowl Association expressed displeasure with the poor ticket sales, saying nearly 20,000 tickets remained unsold as of the week of the game, and that if it was not a sellout the game would likely not remain in Jacksonville.

=== Offensive matchups ===
Media attention was also directed at the teams' offensive capabilities. Boston College quarterback Matt Ryan was named the Atlantic Coast Conference Player of the Year in the week leading up to the game. In the first half of the 2007 season, Ryan had been prominently mentioned in candidate lists for the Heisman Trophy, college football's highest individual award. Although Ryan's late-game comeback in their previous game against Virginia Tech had made him a front-runner, the team's two subsequent losses to unranked teams dropped him from contention for the Heisman. Excellent performances in a division-clinching win at Clemson and against Miami seemed to return Ryan to Heisman-candidate form, however, and heading into the ACC Championship Game, Ryan appeared to be the biggest offensive threat for Boston College.

Virginia Tech's offense was led by an unusual two-quarterback system, as junior Sean Glennon shared time with freshman Tyrod Taylor. While Glennon proved to be a better pocket passer, Taylor's quickness enabled him to scramble out of trouble and gain positive yardage even when no open receivers were available for passes. Until the final game of the season, either Taylor or Glennon was hampered by injury and limited the two-quarterback system's effectiveness. Although the two-quarterback system proved effective against Virginia, there were still questions about how well such an unusual setup would work in the ACC Championship Game.

On the ground, Taylor's offensive scrambling, while effective, was not Virginia Tech's primary rushing weapon. Running back Brandon Ore, Virginia Tech's starter at the position, would need to have a good game, analysts predicted, if the Hokies wanted to win the game. Ore, who suffered several injuries during the 2006 season, failed to produce meaningful offensive yardage until late in the season, disappointing many fans who hoped he would repeat his excellent 2006 performance on the field. With a 146-yard performance against Virginia in the final game of the regular season, Ore seemed to have regained his 2006 form and promised success in the ACC Championship Game.

The Boston College ground offense was led by running back Andre Callender, who had perhaps his biggest game of the year during the division-clinching match against Clemson two weeks earlier. In that game, Callender finished with 92 receiving yards and 75 rushing yards. Due to the success of Matt Ryan's passing attack, however, Callender was used mostly as a backfield receiver and was the team's leading receiver statistically during the 2007 season. In the regular season, Callender amassed 905 yards rushing, 613 yards receiving, and 13 total touchdowns. Callender's normal backup, running back A.J. Brooks, was suspended for the ACC Championship Game.

=== Defensive matchups ===
Virginia Tech's defense was considered stronger than that of Boston College. For the ACC Championship Game, Virginia Tech returned senior linebacker Vince Hall to the starting lineup. Hall had sat out four straight games, including the previous Boston College match, after suffering a broken forearm and wrist. ESPN named Hall and Xavier Adibi, Tech's other senior linebacker, the "best linebacker duo in the country".

On Virginia Tech's defensive secondary, Brandon Flowers, one of Tech's starting cornerbacks, was a second-team All-ACC defensive selection and had five interceptions in the season. Assisting Flowers would be Victor "Macho" Harris, who had also netted five interceptions during the regular season. During the 2007 season, Sports Illustrated called the two "maybe the finest cornerback duo in America."

At the end of the regular season, Boston College was ranked 26th nationally in total defense, and 2nd nationally in run defense. Its pass defense, however, was ranked 106th in the country, and since Boston College was without senior cornerback DeJuan Tribble, who was recovering from a sprained knee ligament, it was expected that the Eagles' linebackers would have to play a very good game to stop Virginia Tech's passing offense. Jo-Lonn Dunbar, who had been named to the preseason watch list for the Bronko Nagurski Trophy (awarded to the top defensive player in the country) was expected to fill the gaps and stop both rushing and passing elements of Virginia Tech's offense.

In addition, safety Jamie Silva would have to play a strong game to support the Boston College cornerback replacing the injured Tribble. Silva, an All-ACC defensive selection, led the team with five interceptions and was very good in moving up to stop the run as well. On the defensive line, defensive end Nick Larkin was a quarterfinalist for the Lott Trophy, an award given to the defensive player with the most "defensive impact" nationally.

== Game summary ==
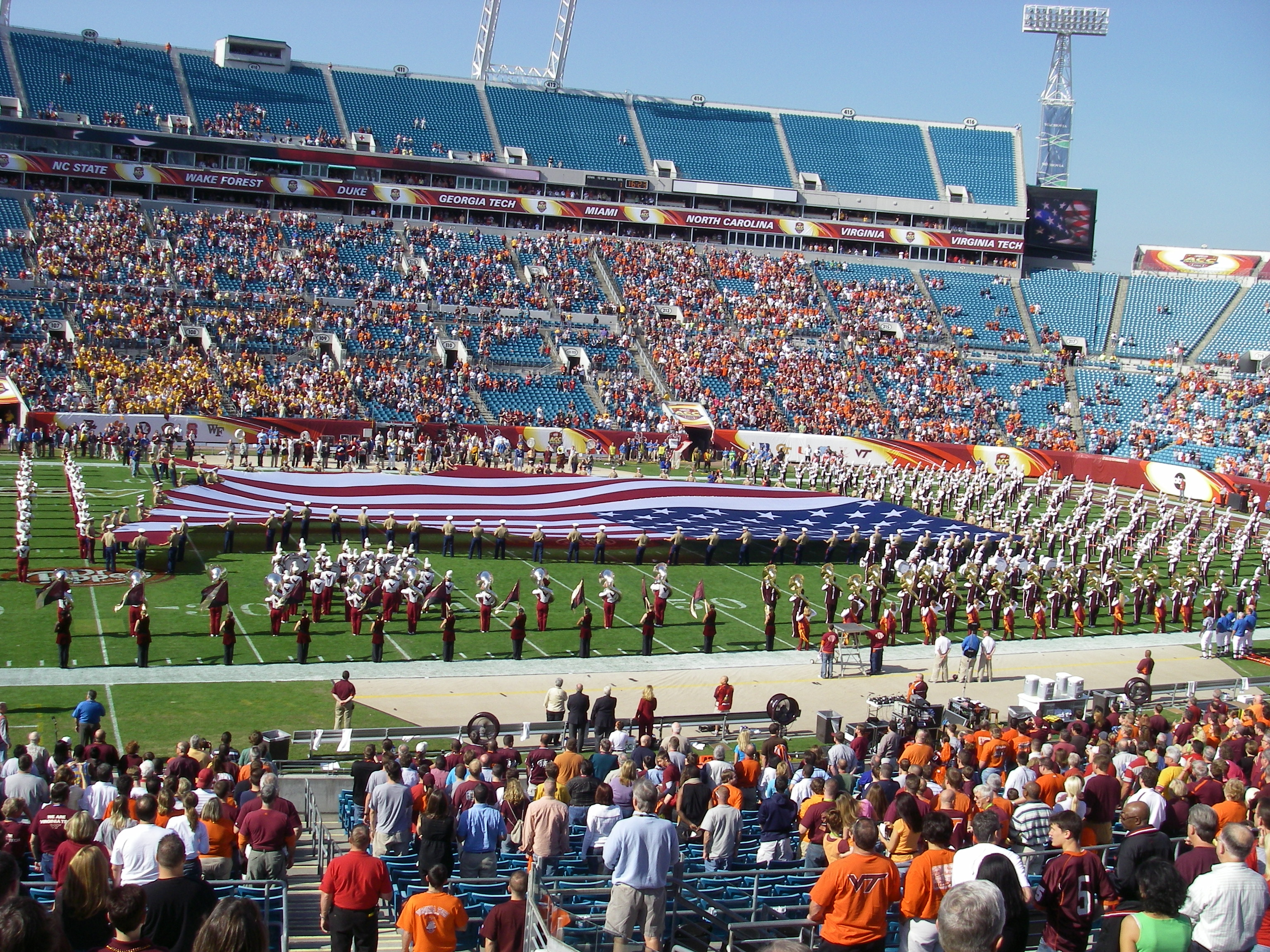
A giant American flag was stretched across the field as the Marching Virginians played the national anthem before kickoff.

The 2007 ACC Championship Game kicked off at 13:10 EST in Jacksonville, Florida. At kickoff, the weather was partly cloudy, with winds from the northeast at 18 miles per hour (29 km/h). The air temperature was 69 °F (21 °C). The official attendance estimate was 53,212, but by most accounts the actual attendance was far lower. Virginia Tech fans made up most of the crowd, and fewer than 5,000 Boston College fans were present at the game. The game was broadcast on ABC and netted a television rating of 4.1, placing it behind the SEC Championship Game and the Big 12 Championship Game, which earned ratings of 5.9 and 6.6, respectively.

The Marching Virginians, Virginia Tech's marching band, and the "Screaming Eagles", the Boston College Marching Band, played the national anthem before the game. The pre-game coin toss involved two members of the Wounded Warrior Project, a program that assists the physical rehabilitation of wounded American combat veterans returning to the United States from fighting overseas. One soldier from Virginia and another from Massachusetts were chosen to throw the ceremonial coin that would determine the game's starting possession. Supervising the coin toss was referee Jack Childress, who had also officiated the inaugural ACC Championship Game.

=== First quarter ===
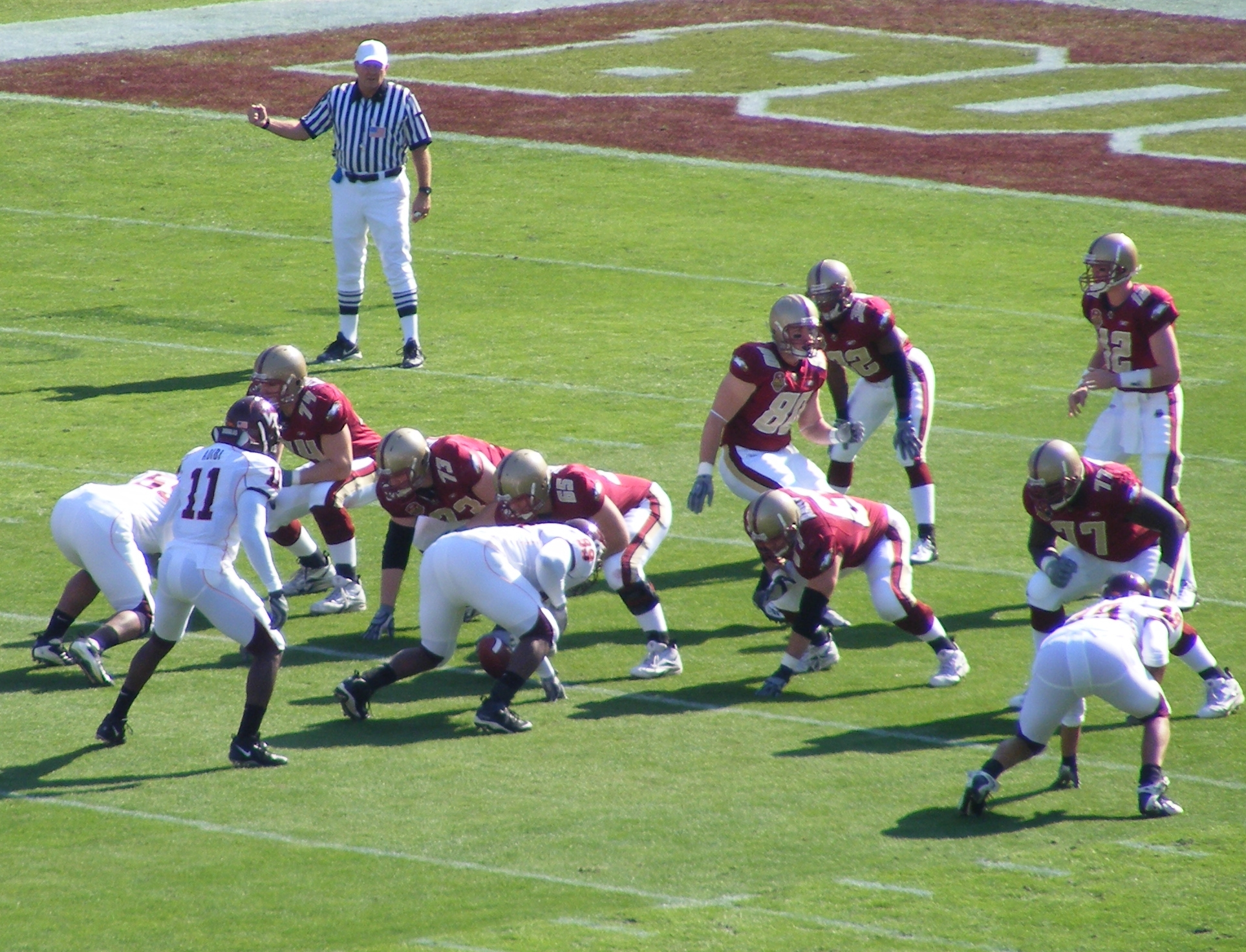
Matt Ryan (#12, far right) and the Boston College Eagles line up on offense on the opening play

Virginia Tech won the opening coin toss and deferred its option to the second half. Boston College received the opening kickoff, which was downed in the end zone for a touchback. Starting at their own 20-yard line, the Eagles advanced down the field as quarterback Matt Ryan completed several passes and running back Andre Callender contributed several long runs. A pass interference call against Virginia Tech, coupled with a 10-yard run by Callender, put Boston College at the Virginia Tech 26-yard line. After three consecutive incomplete passes, Eagles kicker Steve Aponavicius attempted a 36-yard field goal. During the field goal, Virginia Tech special teams player Duane Brown broke through the Eagles' line and blocked the kick, giving Virginia Tech possession of the ball.

Virginia Tech's offense, led by quarterback Sean Glennon, began their first possession at their own 37-yard line. However, a sack, a tackle for loss, and an incomplete pass denied the Hokies' offense positive yardage and they were forced to punt. Tech punter Brent Bowden managed a 54-yard kick, which forced the Eagles to start at their own 14-yard line, but three big plays of 16, 19, and 19 yards drove the Eagles deep into Virginia Tech territory. As before, however, Virginia Tech's defense stiffened and Boston College was forced into a fourth down. Instead of attempting a long field goal, the Eagles instead attempted to convert the fourth down but were foiled by an incomplete pass.

On the Hokies' second offensive possession, quarterback Tyrod Taylor took the field in place of Sean Glennon. Two successful passes and two short runs resulted in two first downs and Virginia Tech advanced the ball across the 50-yard line and into Boston College territory. As Taylor attempted to scramble for yet another short run, however, he was tackled behind the line of scrimmage and fumbled the ball. The loose ball was scooped up by Boston College defender Jamie Silva, who returned it 51 yards for a touchdown. The touchdown and subsequent extra point were the first points of the game and gave Boston College a 7–0 lead with 4 minutes remaining in the quarter.

After the kickoff, Virginia Tech's offense again failed to advance the ball. After a three-and-out, the Hokies again punted. The ball traveled 44 yards, forcing the Eagles to start at their own 21-yard line. As the quarter came to a close, the Eagles drove the ball deep into Virginia Tech territory. At the end of the first quarter, Boston College led 7–0.

=== Second quarter ===
At the beginning of the second quarter, the Hokies' defense began to stiffen. Aided by a 10-yard holding penalty against the Eagles, Matt Ryan was forced to complete a 14-yard pass on 4th-and-9 to earn a first down and keep the drive alive. Three incomplete passes followed, however, and the Eagles again settled for a field goal attempt. This time, the 37-yard kick sailed through the uprights, giving Boston College a 10–0 lead with 11:20 remaining in the first half.

Virginia Tech's first offensive drive of the second quarter began on an auspicious note as quarterback Sean Glennon completed a 16-yard pass to wide receiver Josh Morgan. Following the play, a Boston College player committed a personal foul, which added 15 yards to the end of the pass. Another long pass by Glennon, coupled with yet another Boston College penalty, put Virginia Tech deep into the red zone, and the Hokies scored on a 5-yard touchdown pass to Morgan. With 8:15 remaining in the first half, Virginia Tech narrowed Boston College's lead to just three points.

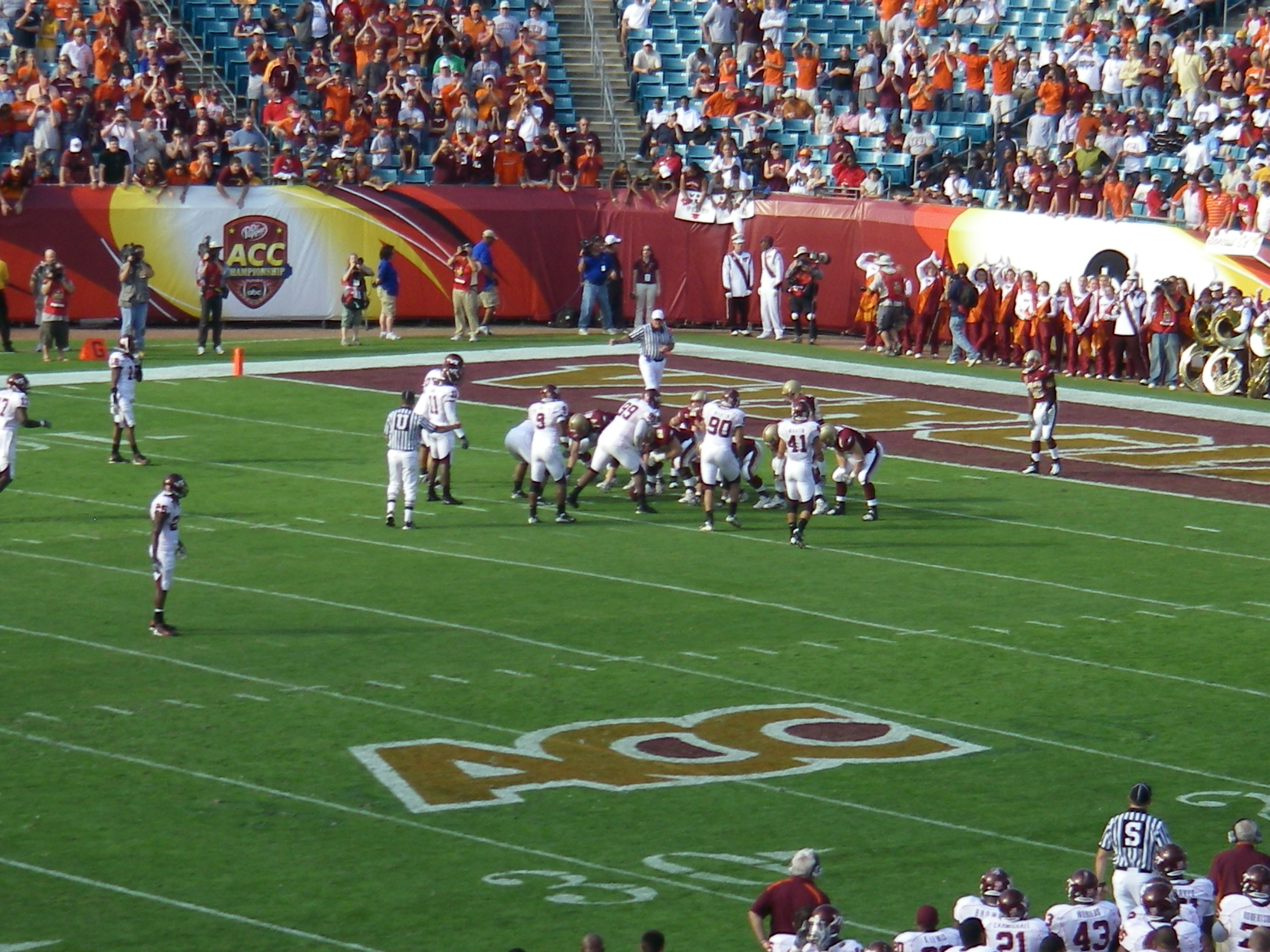
Matt Ryan and the Boston College offense (dark uniforms) are backed up deep in their own territory as the first half comes to an end.

On the ensuing possession, Boston College needed only seven plays and just under three minutes to travel 74 yards. The drive culminated in a 14-yard quarterback scramble for a touchdown. Duane Brown, who had blocked the first Boston College field goal attempt, again charged through the Boston College offensive line and blocked the extra point attempt. This time, the ball bounced into the hands of Virginia Tech's Brandon Flowers, who returned it 75 yards for a defensive two-point conversion. The play kept Boston College's lead within a single touchdown and extra point. With 5:27 remaining in the half, the score was now 16–9 in favor of Boston College.

Tech quarterback Sean Glennon's first pass of the new possession, long throw downfield, was intercepted by Boston College defender Jamie Silva. The length of the pass meant Boston College did not have good field position following the turnover. After earning a quick first down, the Eagles were stopped and forced to punt. With 2:13 remaining before halftime, the Hokies had one more offensive opportunity.

Beginning at their own 20-yard line, the Virginia Tech offense marched down the field. Running back Branden Ore ran 11 yards for a first down, and two long passes from Sean Glennon to wide receiver Eddie Royal put the Hokies into scoring position. After failing to gain first downs with short runs, Virginia Tech was forced to use its timeouts to stop the clock and the first half from ending before they had a chance to score. On a 3rd-and-7 from the Boston College 13-yard line, Glennon finally connected with wide receiver Josh Hyman, who crossed into the end zone for a touchdown. The extra point tied the game, 16–16.

With no time left to mount an answering drive, Boston College received the kickoff and let time run out. Heading into halftime, the two teams were tied, 16–16.

=== Third quarter ===
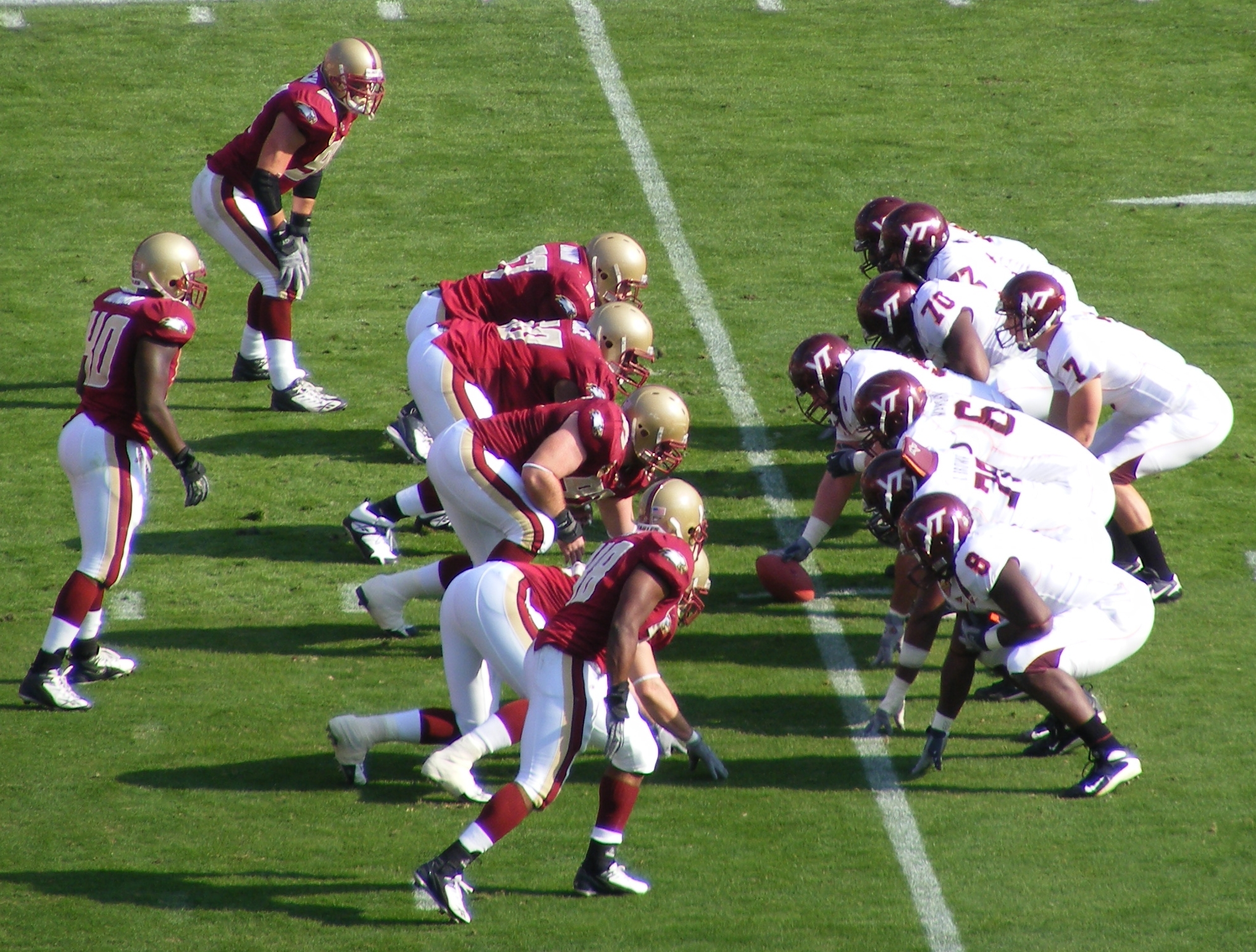
Sean Glennon (far right, under center), was the game's MVP.

Because they deferred their selection to the second half during the opening coin toss, Virginia Tech received the ball to begin the half. The Hokies continued to rotate between quarterbacks Sean Glennon and Tyrod Taylor during the possession, and picked up two first downs, one through the air and the other on the ground. After Glennon was sacked at the 50-yard line, however, the drive sputtered and the Hokies were forced to punt the ball.

Boston College, in their first possession of the second half, fared even worse than Virginia Tech did. Two incomplete passes and a 5-yard delay of game penalty forced Boston College into a three-and-out possession that resulted in a punt. On its second possession, Virginia Tech had a three-and-out drive, thanks in part to an 11-yard sack of Sean Glennon by Boston College's Kevin Atkins.

After receiving the punt, Boston College quarterback Matt Ryan connected on a 31-yard pass to wide receiver Brandon Robinson. As before, however, the offense stalled. On 4th-and-1 from the Virginia Tech 30-yard line, Ryan attempted a pass that fell incomplete, turning the ball over on downs. As a result of pressure applied by the Boston College defense, the Hokies continued to have difficulty moving the ball.

The Hokies were forced to punt again, and Brent Bowden's 50-yard punt stuck the Eagles deep in their own territory. The drive began with a five-yard penalty against Boston College and culminated two plays later in a six-yard loss on a sack of Matt Ryan by Hokie defender Barry Booker. Boston College punted, but the kick by Johnny Ayers traveled just 34 yards before sailing out of bounds.

Virginia Tech had good starting field position at their own 44-yard line. One quick first down later, the clock ran out on the third quarter. As neither team had scored in the quarter, the score remained tied at 16–16.

=== Fourth quarter ===
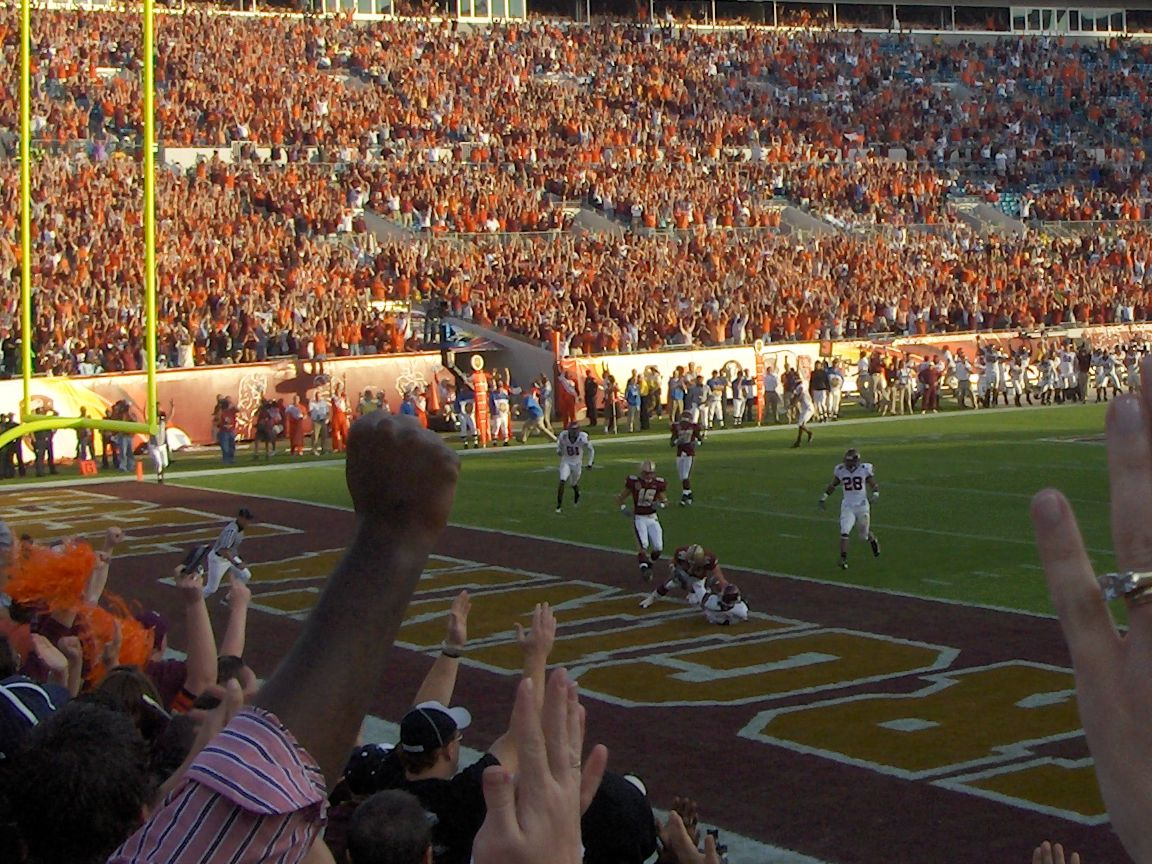
Virginia Tech fans celebrate as Hokie wide receiver Eddie Royal (center, prone) catches a go-ahead touchdown pass halfway through the fourth quarter

Despite starting almost at midfield, the offensive drive that began at the end of the third quarter failed to reach field goal range, and the Hokies were forced to punt. Boston College's offense fared no better, however, and punted after a three-and-out possession. The ball was downed at the Virginia Tech 16-yard line, and the Hokies began their first full offensive possession of the fourth quarter.

After an incomplete pass from quarterback Tyrod Taylor, the Hokies got their first big offensive break of the second half. On a designed play, Taylor scrambled for 31 yards, the largest play in the game for the Hokies. Two successful runs by running back Branden Ore followed, earning the Hokies 23 more yards and pushing the offense deep into Boston College territory. A false-start penalty set the Hokie offense back, but on the next play, quarterback Sean Glennon connected with wide receiver Eddie Royal on a 24-yard strike for a touchdown. The touchdown and extra point were the first points of the second half and gave Virginia Tech a 23–16 lead with 6:30 remaining in the game.

Boston College began its second possession of the fourth quarter knowing it had to score a touchdown to tie the game. Quarterback Matt Ryan had his best success of the day, connecting on seven of ten passes during the drive and picking up 58 yards. All the Eagles' yardage on the drive came through the air, and with 2:25 remaining, the Eagles found themselves at the Virginia Tech 14-yard line. Facing a fourth down and needing four yards for a first down, Matt Ryan fell back to attempt a pass. The throw was intercepted by Virginia Tech's Vince Hall.

Starting at its own 10-yard line, Virginia Tech ran three straight running plays in an effort to run the clock down and prevent Boston College from having enough time to conduct another offensive drive. After the third run was stopped for no gain, however, the Hokies were forced to punt the ball. Boston College now had 28 seconds to score a touchdown and either tie the game with an extra point or win it with a two-point conversion.

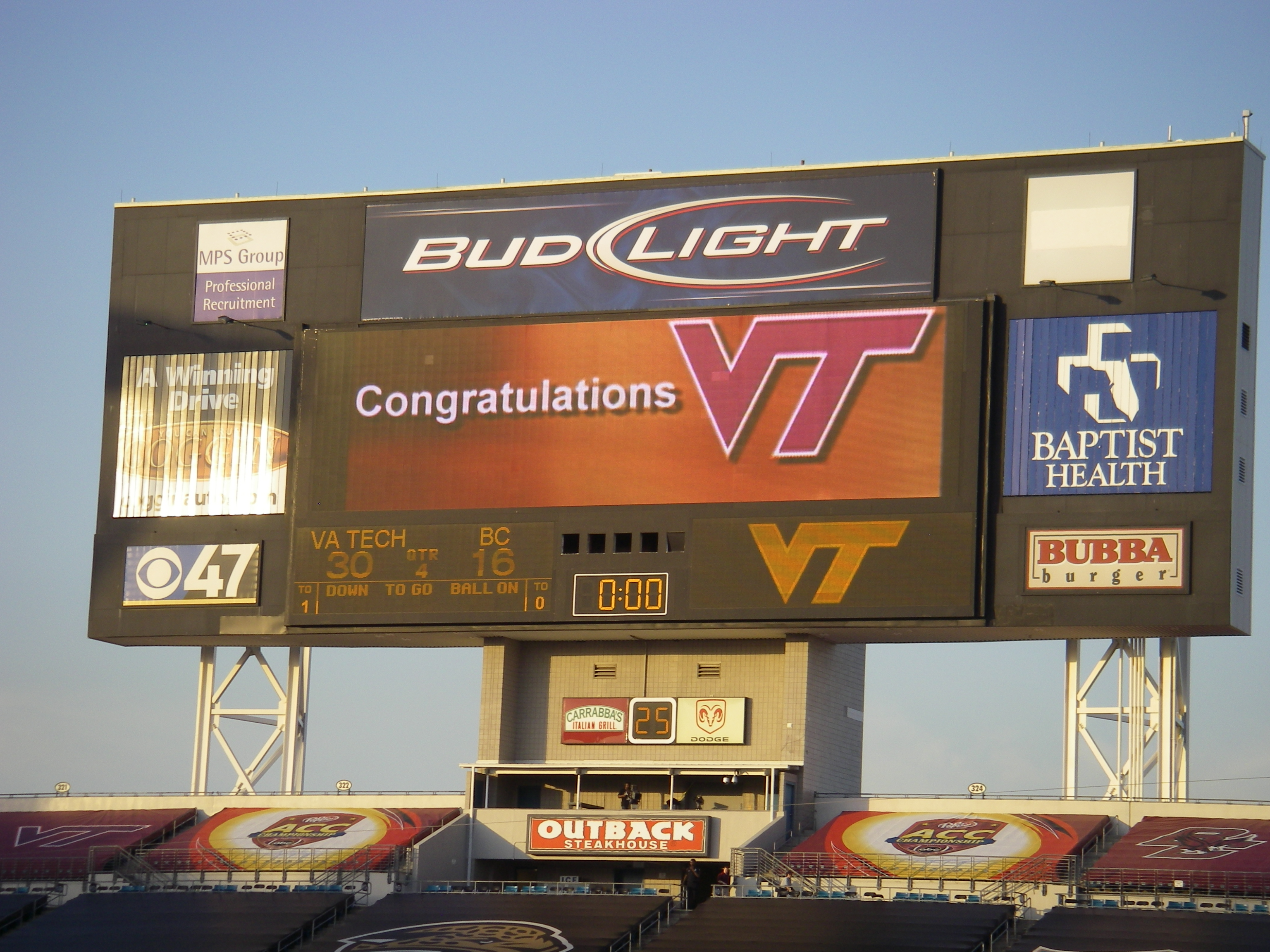
The final scoreboard of the 2007 ACC Championship Game records the 30–16 final score and congratulates Virginia Tech on its victory.

The Boston College drive began on its own 35-yard line. With little time remaining, Boston College would have to complete one or more Hail Mary passes. Although the odds of completing one such pass, let alone several, were very low, many Virginia Tech fans remained worried, as Boston College had previously beaten the Hokies in similar circumstances earlier in the season. Matt Ryan's first two passes fell incomplete, and his third was intercepted by Virginia Tech's Xavier Adibi and returned 40 yards for a Virginia Tech touchdown.

The score came with 11 seconds remaining and gave Virginia Tech its final lead, 30–16. With no chance to win, Boston College elected to let the clock run out after receiving the kickoff. Virginia Tech won the 2007 ACC Championship, 30–16.

== Final statistics ==
Statistical comparison
	BC	VT
1st downs	24	22
Total yards	389	300
Passing yards	305	202
Rushing yards	84	98
Penalties	5–49	7–46
3rd down conversions	5–16	9–16
4th down conversions	1–4	0–0
Turnovers	2	2
Time of possession	33:47	26:13

Virginia Tech quarterback Sean Glennon was named the game's Most Valuable Player. Glennon finished the game having completed 18 of his 27 passes, earning 174 passing yards, three touchdowns (18 points), and one interception. Boston College quarterback Matt Ryan had finished 33 of 52 for 305 yards and two interceptions, no passing touchdowns, and one rushing touchdown.

Each team finished with two turnovers—Virginia Tech fumbled the ball once and threw one interception, while Boston College's offense threw two. Each team earned seven points off of turnovers, and Virginia Tech blocked two kicks. The two blocked kicks effectively netted five points for Virginia Tech, as the blocked field goal prevented Boston College from scoring three points, and the other blocked kick was returned 75 yards for a rare defensive two-point conversion. The two blocked kicks by Virginia Tech were the first and second blocked kicks in ACC Championship Game history, and Boston College's fumble return for a touchdown was the first fumble recovery and defensive touchdown in ACC Championship Game history.

=== Virginia Tech statistical recap ===
Individual Leaders
Virginia Tech Passing
	C/ATT	Yds	TD	INT
S. Glennon	18/27	174	3	1
T. Taylor	3/6	24	0	0
Virginia Tech Rushing
	Car	Yds	TD	LG
B. Ore	19	55	0	14
T. Taylor	9	36	0	31
K. Lewis	1	7	0	7
Virginia Tech Receiving
	Rec	Yds	TD	LG
J. Morgan	8	55	1	16
E. Royal	4	63	1	24
J. Hyman	3	30	1	13
J. Harper	2	22	0	13

Two-thirds of Virginia Tech's 300 total offensive yardage came via passes from quarterbacks Sean Glennon (174 yards) and Tyrod Taylor (28 yards). Glennon's three passing touchdowns tied an ACC Championship Game record set by former Virginia Tech quarterback Marcus Vick in 2005. Glennon also set the ACC Championship Game record for pass completion percentage (66.7%) by completing 18 of his 27 passes. Taylor, meanwhile, set ACC Championship Game records for longest run and longest quarterback run with a 31-yard scramble in the second quarter that helped set up the tying touchdown for Virginia Tech. Taylor finished the game with 36 rushing yards, the third-most of any player in the game.

On the ground, Taylor's performance was supplemented by Tech running back Branden Ore, who led all rushers with 55 yards on 19 rushes. Fourteen of Ore's 55 yards came on a single play halfway through the fourth quarter when the Boston College's defensive line gave way, admitting Tech's runner into the defensive secondary. The run helped set up Virginia Tech's go-ahead touchdown later in the fourth quarter. Capping Tech's ground game were complementary performances by Kenny Lewis and Sean Glennon, each of whom earned fewer than 10 yards, but picked up first downs on two plays.

Leading all Tech receivers was Josh Morgan, who caught eight passes for 55 yards and a touchdown. Eddie Royal also had an excellent game for the Hokies, catching two long passes of 18 yards and 11 yards on subsequent plays in the second quarter. Royal's 2 catches drove the Hokies deep into Boston College territory, setting up a 13-yard touchdown pass to Josh Hyman that tied the game at halftime. Royal's biggest play, however, came halfway through the fourth quarter when he caught the go-ahead touchdown pass from Sean Glennon. The 24-yard reception was Royal's longest catch of the day, and the touchdown gave the Hokies a lead they would not relinquish for the rest of the game.

Though its offense performed well, it was Virginia Tech's special teams and defense that earned it the win. Duane Brown's twin blocked kicks were the first blocks recorded in ACC Championship Game history and were the 116th and 117th blocked kicks recorded at Virginia Tech under head coach Frank Beamer. In addition to the blocks, Tech special teams excelled on punts and kickoffs. Tech punter Brent Bowden finished the day with seven punts for a total of 324 yards. A 54-yard kick in the first quarter was the fourth-longest punt in ACC Championship Game history.

On defense, linebacker Vince Hall, in his second game after recovering from a broken forearm, led all defensive players with 11 tackles. Hall also recorded an interception in the late stages of the fourth quarter that allowed Virginia Tech to run down the clock and force Boston College into a hasty offense. Tied for third overall was Tech's Xavier Adibi, who recorded nine tackles (one for loss) and caught the game-ending interception. Adibi returned the interception 40 yards for a defensive touchdown that sealed the victory for the Hokies.

=== Boston College statistical recap ===
Individual Leaders
Boston College Passing
	C/ATT	Yds	TD	INT
Matt Ryan	33/52	305	0	2
Boston College Rushing
	Car	Yds	TD	LG
A. Callender	15	51	0	11
M. Ryan	6	35	1	19
L.V. Whitworth	1	1	0	0
Boston College Receiving
	Rec	Yds	TD	LG
A. Callender	13	92	0	19
K. Challenger	4	45	0	19
R. Gunnell	4	44	0	15
B. Robinson	3	54	0	31
C. Megawa	3	27	0	13

Though Boston College lost the game on the scoreboard, it won almost every statistical category. Quarterback Matt Ryan outperformed both Hokie quarterbacks combined in passing yardage, throwing for 305 yards. Ryan was extremely accurate through the air in the fourth quarter, throwing eight straight complete passes, an ACC Championship Game record. Ryan also was surprisingly successful on the ground, rushing for Boston College's touchdown of the game—a 14-yard sprint in the second quarter that put Boston College ahead 16–7.

In the first half, the Eagles offense recorded 20 first downs. In the second half, it managed just four first downs, three of which came in one drive in the fourth quarter. As a result of second-half pressure from Virginia Tech, Ryan was forced into two late-game interceptions, including one that was returned for a Virginia Tech defensive touchdown.

Ryan finished the game with 35 rushing yards, just one short of Hokie quarterback Tyrod Taylor, who had been highly promoted as a runner heading into the game. Ryan finished fourth among all rushers, and Eagle running back Andre Callender, the sole running back on the Eagles' roster, finished second, rushing for 51 yards in the game. Callender game-long 11-yard run helped set up the Eagles for a field goal attempt early in the second quarter.

Callender's true success, however, was in the passing game, where he accrued 92 yards, putting him first among all receivers in the game. Callender's 13 catches were an ACC Championship Game record and were the fourth-highest total for a receiver in any game in ACC history. Wide receiver Kevin Challenger finished the game with 4 catches for 45 yards, while the Eagles' Rich Gunnell finished the game with 54 yards. Surprisingly for the number of receiving yards recorded by the Eagles in the game, no Boston College receiver caught a touchdown.

Boston College punter Johnny Ayres kicked four punts a total of 159 yards, including one long kick that traveled 55 yards and set the mark for the third-longest punt in ACC Championship Game history. Kicker Steve Aponavicius successfully kicked a 37-yard field goal early in the second quarter. but after his second kick was blocked, Boston College head coach Jeff Jagodzinski seemed reluctant to try long field goals and instead sent in the offense to attempt to convert the fourth down. Out of four tries, only one fourth down was converted.

On defense, Boston College had more success than predicted by pre-game coverage. Jamie Silva's fumble return for a touchdown was the first defensive score in ACC Championship Game history. Silva finished the game with five tackles (one for loss), one interception, the forced fumble, and the defensive touchdown. DeLeon Gause, meanwhile, was the Eagles' leading tackler, recording 10 stops including one tackle for loss. Altogether, the Eagles recorded four sacks and nine tackles for loss, holding the Hokie offense in check for most of the game.

== Post-game effects ==
Virginia Tech's victory in the ACC Championship Game had far-reaching sporting consequences for the 2007–2008 college football bowl season and in the future site of the ACC Championship Game. The 2007 game injected approximately $10 million into the Jacksonville economy. Thousands of hotel rooms were filled by fans traveling to the game, and the impact they created was larger than that of the previous year's game, which featured teams that had shorter distances to travel and whose fans had generated less demand for overnight accommodation.

=== 2008 ACC Championship Game ===
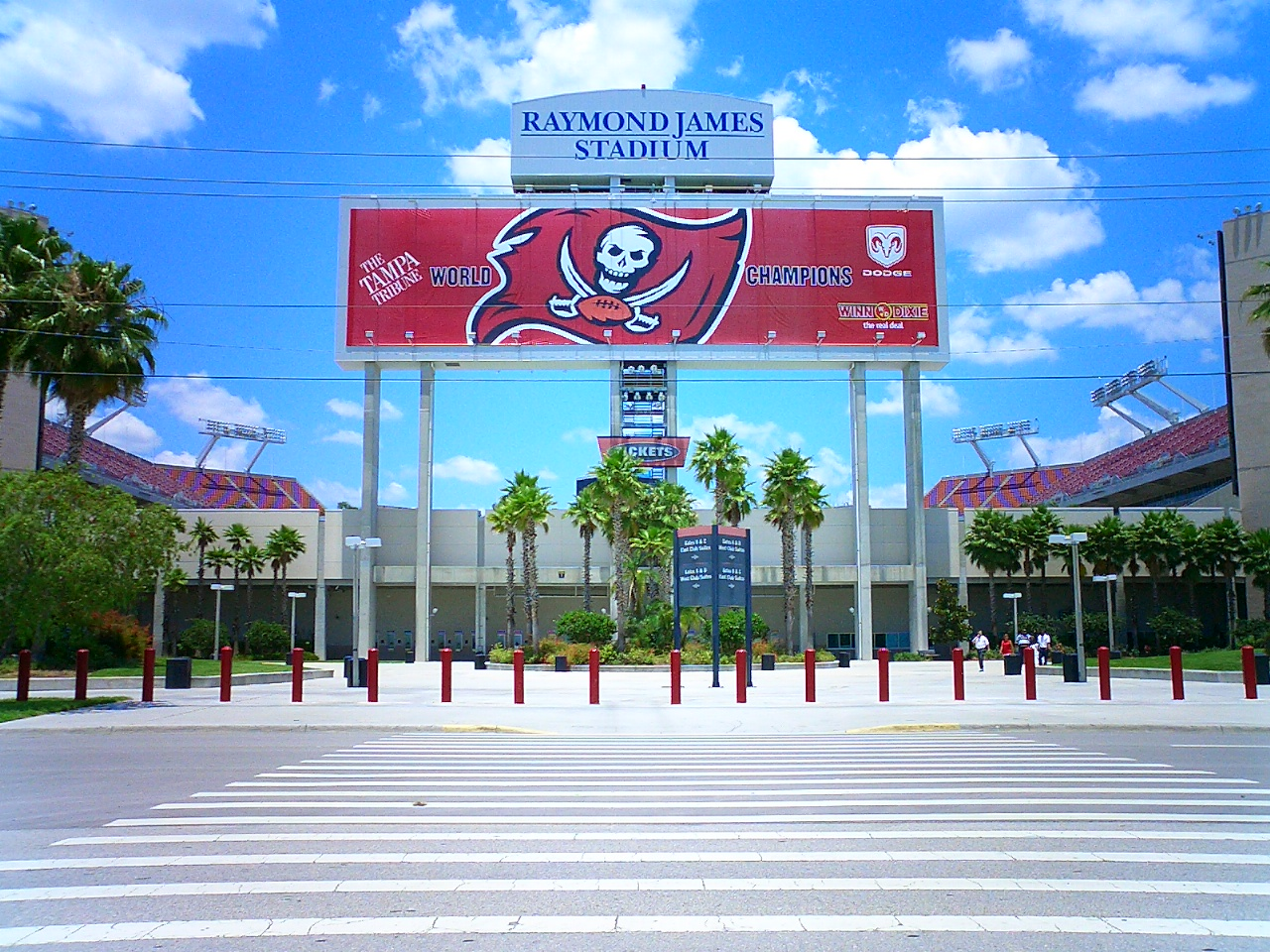
Raymond James Stadium in Tampa, Florida was selected as the site of the 2008 ACC Championship Game following poor attendance in Jacksonville.

After poor attendance in the ACC Championship Game at Jacksonville for the second straight year, ACC officials and representatives of the conference's member schools elected not to extend the Gator Bowl Association's contract to host the game. On December 12, the ACC announced that Tampa, Florida would host the game in 2008 and 2009 and Charlotte, North Carolina would host the game in 2010 and 2011.

The cities were chosen based on bids presented to the ACC and its member schools. Each city requested and was granted a two-year contract, locking the ACC into the locations well in advance of the actual games. Tampa was chosen as the site of the 2008 game because Charlotte was scheduled to hold the annual convention of the Association for Career and Technical Education at the same time as the game, and adequate hotel space would not be ready in time for the two events.

=== Bowl effects ===
With its win, Virginia Tech clinched an automatic bid to the 2008 Orange Bowl. This caused ripple effects in the bowl destinations for virtually every bowl-eligible ACC team. In the 2007 season, the ACC had guaranteed tie-ins with eight bowl games.

The ACC's representatives to these bowls were picked in a hierarchical system that allowed the Chick-fil-A Bowl to have the first selection after the Orange Bowl's automatic pick of the winner of the ACC Championship Game. Following the Chick-fil-A Bowl were the Gator Bowl, Champs Sports Bowl, Music City Bowl, Meineke Car Care Bowl, Emerald Bowl, and Humanitarian Bowl, in that order. The ACC's agreement with the bowls dictated that the bowls would select the highest-ranking ACC team left after the bowls with higher selections made their pick. Bowls would be allowed to skip the highest remaining team only if the next team was within one conference win of the highest remaining team. Therefore, a bowl could select a 5–3 team over a 6–2 team, but could not select a 4–4 team over a 6–2 team.

With Virginia Tech earning an automatic bid to the Orange Bowl, the Chick-fil-A Bowl had the first pick of the remaining ACC teams. Boston College, by virtue of its loss in the ACC Championship Game, was the highest remaining team, but Chick-fil-A Bowl representatives instead chose to invite Clemson, which had finished behind Boston College in the Atlantic Division standings. In making their decision, Chick-fil-A Bowl representatives cited Boston College's poor attendance at the ACC Championship Game in Jacksonville. The Gator Bowl, which is also held in Jacksonville, was reluctant to choose a team that had participated in the ACC Championship Game out of fear that the team's fans would be unwilling to return to Jacksonville so quickly. The Gator Bowl Association requested and received a waiver from the league's strict bowl selection rules and selected Virginia over Boston College.

The Champs Sports Bowl was thus forced to select Boston College. Boston College players and fans, owing to the decreased status of the Champs Sports Bowl when compared with the Orange, Chick-fil-A, and Gator Bowls, were disappointed with the selection and match against Michigan State. Had Boston College won the ACC Championship Game, it would have earned the automatic bid to the Orange Bowl, and Virginia Tech would have been selected by the Chick-fil-A Bowl, which had earlier expressed an interest in inviting the Hokies to the game for a second straight year. Clemson would have been bumped down to the Gator Bowl, and Virginia would have been forced into the Champs Sports Bowl.

== See also ==
- List of Atlantic Coast Conference football champions
- Boston College–Virginia Tech football rivalry

Other conference championship games

- 2007 SEC Championship Game
- 2007 Big 12 Championship Game
- 2007 MAC Championship Game
- 2007 Conference USA Football Championship Game
