= 2019 Boston College Eagles football team =

American college football season

2019 Boston College Eagles football

Birmingham Bowl, L 6–38 vs. Cincinnati
- Conference: Atlantic Coast Conference
- Atlantic Division
- Record: 6–7 (4–4 ACC)
- Head coach: Steve Addazio (7th season; regular season); Rich Gunnell (interim; bowl game)
- Offensive coordinator: Mike Bajakian (1st season)
- Offensive scheme: Spread
- Defensive coordinator: Bill Sheridan (1st season)
- Base defense: 4–3
- Captains: Ben Glines; Tanner Karafa
- Home stadium: Alumni Stadium

Uniform
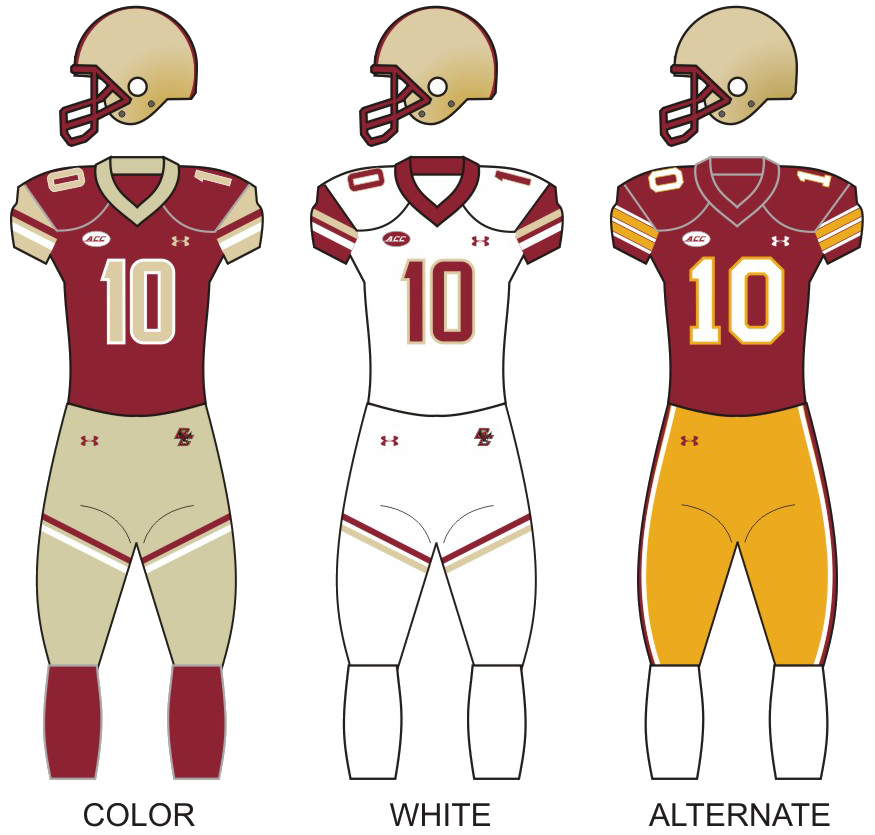

2019 Atlantic Coast Conference football standings
	Conf.			Overall
Team	W		L	W		L
Atlantic Division
No. 2 Clemson xy$^	8	–	0	14	–	1
Louisville	5	–	3	8	–	5
Wake Forest	4	–	4	8	–	5
Boston College	4	–	4	6	–	7
Florida State	4	–	4	6	–	7
Syracuse	2	–	6	5	–	7
NC State	1	–	7	4	–	8
Coastal Division
Virginia x	6	–	2	9	–	5
Virginia Tech	5	–	3	8	–	5
Pittsburgh	4	–	4	8	–	5
North Carolina	4	–	4	7	–	6
Miami (FL)	4	–	4	6	–	7
Duke	3	–	5	5	–	7
Georgia Tech	2	–	6	3	–	9
Championship: Clemson 62, Virginia 17
^ – College Football Playoff participant; $ – Conference champion; x – Division champion/co-champions; Rankings from AP Poll

The 2019 Boston College Eagles football team represented Boston College during the 2019 NCAA Division I FBS football season. The Eagles played their home games at Alumni Stadium in Chestnut Hill, Massachusetts and competed in the Atlantic Division of the Atlantic Coast Conference. They were led by seventh-year head coach Steve Addazio until his dismissal on December 1, 2019. For their bowl game, the Eagles were led by interim head coach Rich Gunnell.

== Preseason ==
=== Coaching changes ===
In January 2019, head coach Steve Addazio announced the hiring of Mike Bajakian as the new offensive coordinator, replacing Scot Loeffler, who left to take the head coaching job at Bowling Green. Bajakian had spent the previous four years as the quarterbacks coach for the Tampa Bay Buccaneers.

=== Preseason media poll ===
In the preseason ACC media poll, Boston College was predicted to finish in fifth in the Atlantic Division.

=== Award watch lists ===
Listed in the order that they were released

Award	Player	Position	Year
Maxwell Award	A. J. Dillon	RB	Junior
Doak Walker Award	A. J. Dillon	RB	Junior
Mackey Award	Jake Burt	TE	(redshirt) Senior
Mackey Award	Hunter Long	TE	(redshirt) Sophomore
Rimington Trophy	Alec Lindstrom	C	(redshirt) Sophomore

== Schedule ==
Boston College's 2019 schedule began with their conference home opener against Virginia Tech on August 31. In non-conference play, the Eagles played home games against Richmond of the Colonial Athletic Association and Kansas of the Big 12 Conference, and road games against Rutgers of the Big Ten Conference and Notre Dame, a football independent. In ACC play, they faced the other members of the Atlantic Division as well as Virginia Tech and Pittsburgh from the Coastal Division.

Date	Time	Opponent	Site	TV	Result	Attendance
August 31, 2019	4:00 p.m.	Virginia Tech	Alumni Stadium; Chestnut Hill, MA (rivalry)	ACCN	W 35–28	35,213
September 7	3:30 p.m.	Richmond*	Alumni Stadium; Chestnut Hill, MA	ACCN Extra	W 45–13	30,111
September 13	7:30 p.m.	Kansas*	Alumni Stadium; Chestnut Hill, MA	ACCN	L 24–48	32,848
September 21	12:00 p.m.	at Rutgers*	SHI Stadium; Piscataway, NJ	BTN	W 30–16	32,217
September 28	3:30 p.m.	Wake Forest	Alumni Stadium; Chestnut Hill, MA	ACCN	L 24–27	39,352
October 5	12:30 p.m.	at Louisville	Cardinal Stadium; Louisville, KY	ACCRSN	L 39–41	46,007
October 19	12:00 p.m.	NC State^{†}	Alumni Stadium; Chestnut Hill, MA	ACCRSN	W 45–24	30,275
October 26	7:30 p.m.	at No. 4 Clemson	Memorial Stadium; Clemson, SC (O'Rourke–McFadden Trophy)	ACCN	L 7–59	81,081
November 2	12:00 p.m.	at Syracuse	Carrier Dome; Syracuse, NY	ACCN	W 58–27	42,857
November 9	12:00 p.m.	Florida State	Alumni Stadium; Chestnut Hill, MA	ACCN	L 31–38	37,312
November 23	2:30 p.m.	at No. 16 Notre Dame*	Notre Dame Stadium; Notre Dame, IN (Holy War)	NBC	L 7–40	71,827
November 30	3:30 p.m.	at Pittsburgh	Heinz Field; Pittsburgh, PA	ACCN	W 26–19	40,889
January 2, 2020	3:00 p.m.	vs. No. 21 Cincinnati*	Legion Field; Birmingham, AL (Birmingham Bowl)	ESPN	L 6–38	27,193
*Non-conference game; ^{†}Homecoming; Rankings from AP Poll and CFP Rankings after November 5 released prior to game; All times are in Eastern time

== Game summaries ==
=== Virginia Tech ===
	1	2	3	4	Total
Hokies	7	7	7	7	28
Eagles	7	21	0	7	35

=== Richmond ===
	1	2	3	4	Total
Spiders	0	10	0	3	13
Eagles	21	14	10	0	45

=== Kansas ===
	1	2	3	4	Total
Jayhawks	7	21	13	7	48
Eagles	17	7	0	0	24

The Kansas Jayhawks came into the game as a three touchdown underdog, but performances by quarterback Carter Stanley (238 yards passing) and running back Pooka Williams Jr. (121 yards rushing) combined with other efforts to give the Jayhawks their first road win against a "power 5" team in almost 11 years.

Boston College scored first and had the lead 10-0 until the Jayhawks scored on six straight possessions. Kansas took the lead 28-24 at the half thanks to an 82 yard run with 40 seconds remaining before the break to set up a 3-yard score just two plays later. Kansas continued to score in the second half but Boston College could not match the effort. The final score was Kansas 48, Boston College 24.

=== At Rutgers ===
	1	2	3	4	Total
Eagles	7	10	7	6	30
Scarlet Knights	7	6	0	3	16

=== Wake Forest ===
	1	2	3	4	Total
Demon Deacons	10	7	3	7	27
Eagles	0	17	0	7	24

=== At Louisville ===
	1	2	3	4	Total
Eagles	7	15	7	10	39
Cardinals	14	14	3	10	41

=== NC State ===
	1	2	3	4	Total
Wolfpack	0	3	7	14	24
Eagles	7	17	7	14	45

=== At Clemson ===
	1	2	3	4	Total
Eagles	0	7	0	0	7
No. 4 Tigers	17	21	14	7	59

=== At Syracuse ===
	1	2	3	4	Total
Eagles	10	34	7	7	58
Orange	17	3	7	0	27

=== Florida State ===
	1	2	3	4	Total
Seminoles	3	7	14	14	38
Eagles	7	7	0	17	31

=== At Notre Dame ===
	1	2	3	4	Total
Eagles	0	7	0	0	7
No. 16 Fighting Irish	3	13	17	7	40

=== At Pittsburgh ===
	1	2	3	4	Total
Eagles	6	7	10	3	26
Panthers	0	9	7	3	19

=== Vs. Cincinnati (Birmingham Bowl) ===
	1	2	3	4	Total
Eagles	0	0	7	0	7
No. 21 Bearcats	7	10	7	14	38

== Players drafted into the NFL ==
Round	Pick	Player	Position	NFL club
2	62	A. J. Dillon	RB	Green Bay Packers
