= Montel Harris =

American football player (born 1989)

No. 8
- Position: Running back

Personal information
- Born: October 30, 1989 (age 37); Jacksonville, Florida, U.S.
- Listed height: 5 ft 10 in (1.78 m)
- Listed weight: 207 lb (94 kg)

Career information
- College: Boston College (2008–2011); Temple (2012)

Awards and highlights
- First-team All-Big East (2012); First-team All-ACC (2010); Second-team All-ACC (2009)
- Stats at ESPN

Montel Lamar Harris (born October 30, 1989) is an American college football running back. He played college football for the Boston College Eagles and Temple Owls.

== Early life ==
Harris played Pop Warner football for the Normandy Cowboys, until his middle school years. Harris attended Trinity Christian Academy in Jacksonville, Florida along with tailback Jamie Harper. In high school, Harris gained 4,000 yards.

== College career ==
=== Boston College Eagles ===
In Harris' freshman year, he combined with teammate Josh Haden to be the second-most prolific all-freshmen backfield in the country. With 900 rushing yards, Harris broke the school's freshman rushing record.

Sophomore year was a breakout year for Harris on the national stage. With 1,457 yards and 14 touchdowns, Harris was an All-ACC selection (Second Team) an SI.com All-American (honorable mention). On October 17, 2009, Harris broke the school's single game rushing records for yards and touchdowns, amassing 264 yards and 5 touchdowns in a victory over the NC State Wolfpack.

During his junior year, Harris gained 1,243 yards. Harris was injured in the Eagles second last regular season game against the Virginia Cavaliers. He missed the rest of the season after undergoing surgery. Harris was an All-ACC selection (First Team).

Heading into his senior year, Harris was named the Preseason ACC Player of the Year. Harris played in only two games; he missed the first three games of the season and re-injured his knee in a loss to Wake Forest. Prior to the injury, Harris broke the school's rushing record (previously held by Derrick Knight). The school announced that they would be seeking a medical redshirt for Harris, allowing him to play in 2012. On December 16, 2011, Harris' application for a medical redshirt was approved and Harris was scheduled to return to the Eagles in 2012.

As of 2011, Harris had gained 3,735 yards and 27 touchdowns on 787 carries.

On May 1, 2012, Harris was permanently dismissed from the Boston College football team due to a repeated violation of team rules.

=== Temple Owls ===
A fifth-year senior, Harris transferred to Temple in the fall of 2012 after receiving a medical red-shirt for his sixth and final year of eligibility. Harris had a successful final year running for 12 touchdowns and averaging 5.7 yards per carry.

== Professional career ==
In 2013, Harris had a two week tryout with the Tampa Bay Buccaneers. He signed with the Hamilton Tiger-Cats of the Canadian Football League on May 29, 2013, but was released two days later.
