= Chase Rettig =

American football player (born 1991)

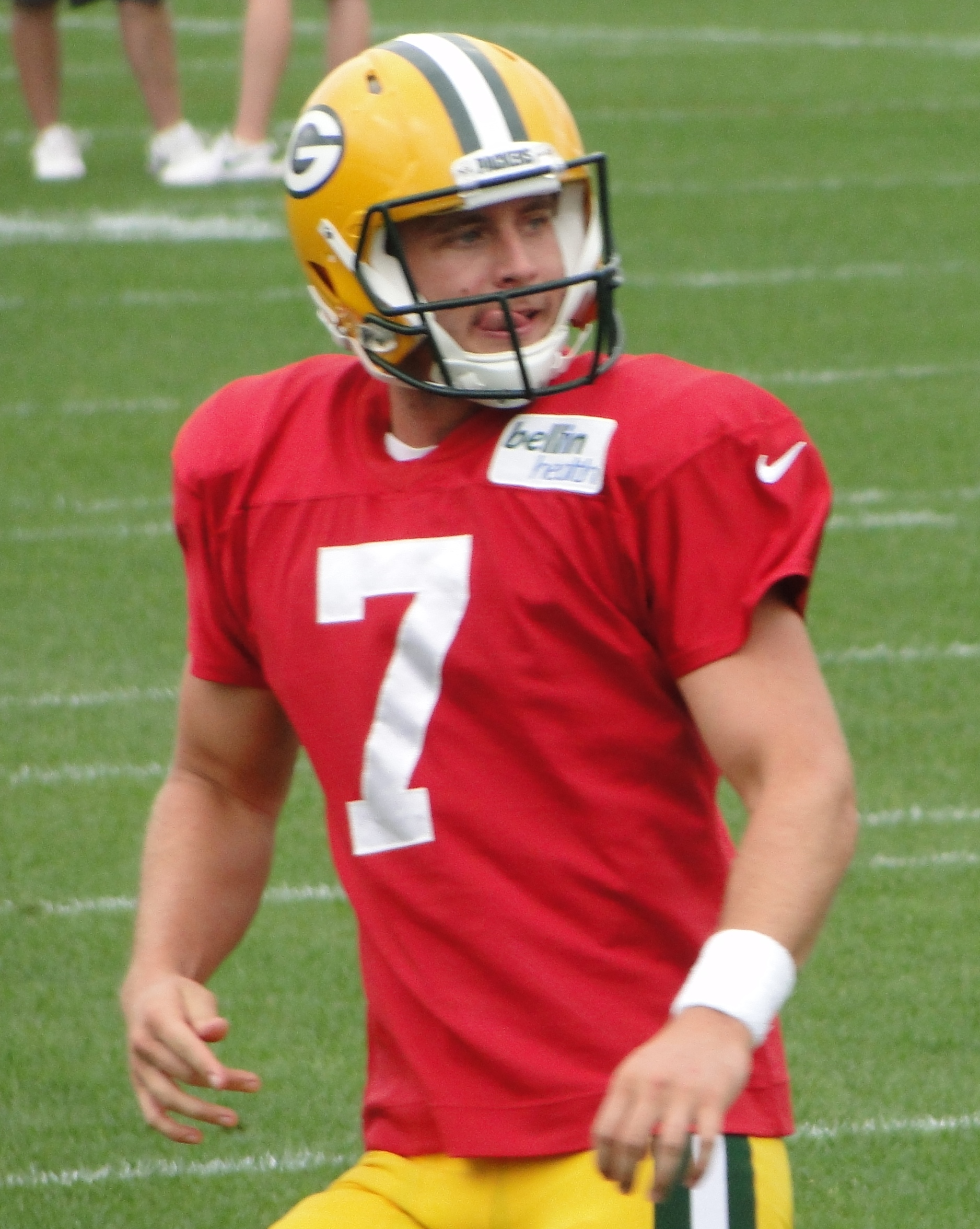
- Rettig at Green Bay Packers training camp in 2014

No. 7
- Position: Quarterback

Personal information
- Born: September 26, 1991 (age 35); Sierra Madre, California, U.S.
- Listed height: 6 ft 2 in (1.88 m)
- Listed weight: 215 lb (98 kg)

Career information
- High school: San Clemente (San Clemente, California)
- College: Boston College
- NFL draft: 2014: undrafted

Career history
- Green Bay Packers (2014)*; San Diego Chargers (2015)*
- * Offseason or practice squad member only
- Stats at Pro Football Reference

Chase McDonald Rettig (born September 26, 1991) is an American former football quarterback. He played college football for the Boston College Eagles. He was the starting quarterback for the Boston College Eagles from 2010 to 2013. Rettig was signed by the Green Bay Packers after going undrafted in 2014.

== Early life ==
Rettig is the son of Mark and Carol Rettig, the second-oldest of their three sons. He played football at La Salle High School in Pasadena, California, prior to his senior season, when he played for San Clemente High School in San Clemente, California. Rettig transferred to San Clemente to be closer to his father's place of business.

In two years at La Salle he threw for 3,800 yards and 40 touchdowns. He earned All-Camino Real League first-team honors in 2007 and 2008, and All-State Underclassman first-team honors in his sophomore year. In his senior season at San Clemente, Rettig threw for 1,748 yards and 18 touchdowns, earning All-South Coast League first-team and Orange County All-Academic first-team honors. Rettig played in the Under Armour All-American Game at Tropicana Field in Saint Petersburg, Florida on January 2, 2010. He chose Boston College over Tennessee and USC.

== College career ==
Rettig began the 2010 season as a backup to starting quarterback Dave Shinskie. He made his debut at Boston College playing against Notre Dame in the third game of the season. He completed a 58-yard touchdown pass to Bobby Swigert but had to leave the game due to an ankle injury. After missing the following game, Rettig earned the starting quarterback job over Shinskie. He led the Eagles to the 2011 Kraft Fight Hunger Bowl, where he completed 14-of-34 passes for 121 yards; the Eagles lost to Nevada 20-13. Rettig threw for 1,238 yards, six touchdowns, and nine interceptions during his freshman season.

For the 2011 season, Rettig chose to change his jersey number from 7 to 11, his high school number and the number of his high school quarterbacks coach. He started all twelve games for the Eagles, throwing for 1,960 yards and 12 touchdowns.

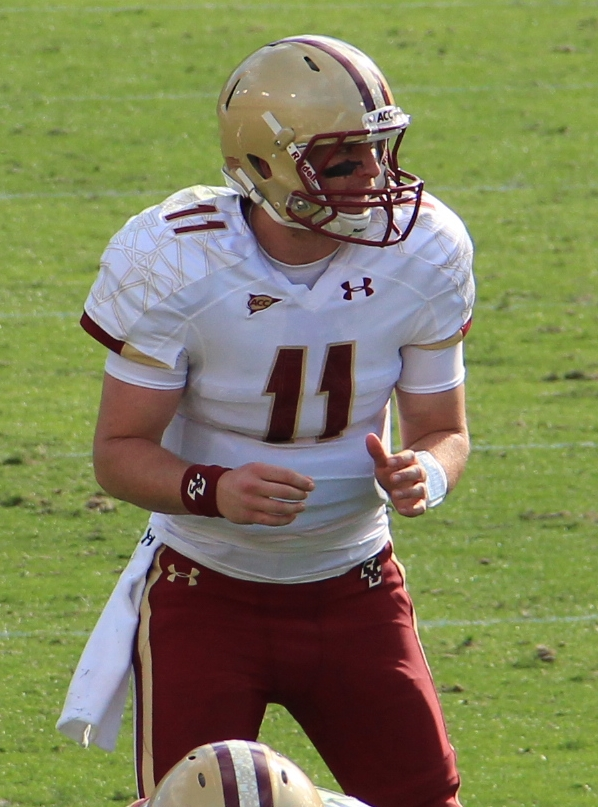
Rettig with Boston College in 2012

Despite leading Boston College to a 2–10 record in the 2012 season, Rettig started all 12 games and threw for 3,055 yards and 17 touchdowns. His season passer rating was a career-high 115.6. He connected with junior wide receiver Alex Amidon 78 times in his breakout season for 1,210 yards.

As a senior in 2013, under first year head coach Steve Addazio, Rettig led Boston College to a 7–6 record, throwing for 1,995 yards and 17 touchdowns. The Eagles lost to Arizona in the 2013 AdvoCare V100 Bowl 42-19. During the game, Rettig completed 16-of-26 passing attempts for 191 yards and threw two first-half interceptions, including a pick-six.

From 2010 to 2013, Rettig started 45 games for Boston College, leading the Eagles to an 18–26 record during that time, including two bowl game appearances. He finished his career having completed 685-of-1,242 passing attempts for 8,248 passing yards and 52 touchdowns.

=== College statistics ===
Legend
**Bold**	Career high

Year	Team	Games			Passing								Rushing			
Year	Team	GP	GS	Record	Cmp	Att	Pct	Yds	Avg	TD	Int	Rtg	Att	Yds	Avg	TD
2010	Boston College	9	8	5–3	100	195	51.3	1,238	6.3	6	9	105.5	36	-43	-1.2	0
2011	Boston College	12	12	4–8	170	317	53.6	1,960	6.2	12	9	112.4	41	-84	-2.0	**1**
2012	Boston College	12	12	2–10	**253**	**467**	54.2	**3,060**	6.6	**17**	**13**	115.7	54	-169	-3.1	0
2013	Boston College	**13**	**13**	**7–5**	162	263	**61.6**	1,995	**7.6**	**17**	8	**140.6**	**60**	**71**	**1.2**	**1**
Career		46	45	18–26	685	1,242	55.2	8,253	6.6	52	39	118.5	191	-225	-1.2	2

== Professional career ==
=== Green Bay Packers ===
After going undrafted in the 2014 NFL draft, Rettig signed with the Green Bay Packers on May 12, 2014. He appeared in the Packers' preseason opener, completing one of three pass attempts for 10 yards, and was sacked twice in the 20–16 loss to the Tennessee Titans. Rettig was released by the Packers on August 24.

=== San Diego Chargers ===
Rettig signed with the San Diego Chargers on May 20, 2015. Rettig was released by San Diego as a part of final roster cuts on August 31.

== Personal life ==
His younger brother Hayden played quarterback at LSU and Rutgers University.
