= DeJuan Tribble =

American football player (born 1985)

No. 29, 31, 27
- Position: Cornerback

Personal information
- Born: April 13, 1985 (age 41); North College Hill, Ohio, U.S.
- Listed height: 5 ft 8 in (1.73 m)
- Listed weight: 189 lb (86 kg)

Career information
- High school: North College Hill (OH)
- College: Boston College
- NFL draft: 2008: 6th round, 192nd overall pick

Career history
- San Diego Chargers (2008); Florida Tuskers (2009); Omaha Nighthawks (2010); Florida Tuskers (2010)

Awards and highlights
- 2× Second-team All-ACC (2006, 2007)
- Stats at Pro Football Reference

DeJuan R. Tribble (born April 13, 1985) is an American former football cornerback. He was selected by the San Diego Chargers in the sixth round of the 2008 NFL draft. He played college football at Boston College. During his time as an Eagle he recorded 15 interceptions, as well as 3 touchdowns.

Tribble also played for the Florida Tuskers and Omaha Nighthawks.

== Professional career ==
Tribble was selected by the Florida Tuskers of the United Football League in the UFL Premiere Season Draft in 2009. He signed with the team on September 9.
