= Frank Harris (quarterback, born 1948) =

American football player

Frank Harris (born March 4, 1948, in Stoneham, Massachusetts) is an American former professional football player who was a quarterback in the National Football League (NFL).

Harris played college football for the Boston College Eagles. He finished his BC career first all time in passing yards (4,555), attempts (655), touchdowns (44), and interceptions (45). Although all of these records would be broken by Doug Flutie, Harris' 37 completions and 57 pass attempts against the Army Black Knights in 1968 are still BC records (Shawn Halloran and Matt Ryan have each tied the attempts record).

Harris was selected by the Detroit Lions in the sixth round (150th overall pick) in the 1971 NFL draft. He was cut by the Lions at the end of the preseason.

After football, Harris went on to a business career, starting out in sales with a liquor company. When his employer wanted to transfer him to Alabama, he quit and returned to the Boston area, where he opened a sporting goods store. He later became the co-owner of an ecological services firm in that area.
