= Steve Aponavicius =

American football player (born 1986)

No. 83
- Position: Placekicker

Personal information
- Born: August 10, 1986 (age 40); Easton, Pennsylvania, U.S.
- Listed height: 5 ft 10 in (1.78 m)
- Listed weight: 185 lb (84 kg)

Career information
- College: Boston College (2006–2009)

Steve Aponavicius (born August 10, 1986) is an American college football kicker and the all-time leading scorer for the Boston Colleges football program. A left-footed soccer convert, Aponavicius made his career debut against nationally ranked Virginia Tech on October 12, 2006 during which he successfully kicked two field goals and two extra points in the Eagles' 22–3 victory.

== Early life and education ==
Aponavicius played baseball and soccer at Easton Area High School in Easton, Pennsylvania, a city known for its high school football. He was an avid member of the "Rover Nation" student cheering section at Cottingham Stadium, where the Easton Red Rovers played football. He never played competitive football prior to arriving at Boston College.

=== Boston College Eagles ===
As a freshman at Boston College in fall of 2005, Aponavicius began kicking field goals inside Alumni Stadium, where he was spotted by Jay Civetti, a graduate assistant in the program. Civetti informed Aponavicius the team was currently looking for kickers and offered the special teams coach's contact information. After a brief one-kick tryout, Aponavicius began practicing with the team.

In his sophomore year in 2006, starting placekicker Ryan Ohliger was suspended from the team following an incident at a local bar, and Aponavicius was given the starting nod for a Thursday night matchup against Virginia Tech in front of a packed crowd of 44,500.

Aponavicius' success as a walk-on kicker for Boston College gained him the nickname "Sid Vicious", a reference to Sex Pistols bassist Sid Vicious, and drew extensive press coverage and comparisons to the famed Notre Dame walk-on Rudy Ruettiger who served as the inspiration to the 1993 film Rudy.

He ended his dream-like season in 2006 with a game-winning 37-yard field goal to defeat Navy in the Meineke Car Care Bowl. Aponavicius finished the season as the team's leading point scorer, amassing 48 points. He was also named to the All-ACC Academic Team.

After receiving his undergraduate degree, Aponavicius enrolled in graduate school for his final year of eligibility. As a fifth-year senior, he became the all-time leading scorer in the history of the Boston College football program.

Boston College coach Frank Spaziani said, "To drop out of the student body and come in here, and after a lot of hard work and a lot of time and energy, to become the all-time leading scorer – that's a great accomplishment that he can be very proud of. And we're very, very happy for him."

== Personal life ==
Aponavicius is of Lithuanian ancestry.
