= Dave Shinskie =

American football player (born 1984)

No. 15
- Position: Quarterback

Personal information
- Born: May 4, 1984 (age 42); Danville, Pennsylvania, U.S.
- Listed height: 6 ft 4 in (1.93 m)
- Listed weight: 209 lb (95 kg)

Career information
- High school: Mount Carmel (PA) Area
- College: Boston College (2009–2012)

David Michael Shinskie (born May 4, 1984) is an American former football quarterback. Who played for Boston College. He was BC's starting quarterback for the 2009 season and the beginning of the 2010 season, but then lost the starting spot to Chase Rettig.

== Early life ==
Shinskie is the son of David and Joann Shinskie, the third-oldest of their four sons. He played football at Mount Carmel Area High School in Kulpmont, Pennsylvania. In his four years at Mount Carmel he threw 400 completions for 6,334 yards. In his junior season Shinskie threw 111 completions for 1,815 yards and 16 touchdowns, while in his senior season he threw 160 completions for 2,524 yards and 26 touchdowns. Shinskie also punted for the team. He earned Associated Press All-State first team honors and Associated Press Small School Player of the Year honors in his senior season. Shinksie also played baseball and basketball in high school, and initially went on to a career in professional baseball.

== Baseball career ==
Shinskie was drafted by the Minnesota Twins in the fourth round of the 2003 Major League Baseball draft. He ended his baseball career in 2009 playing for the New Hampshire Fisher Cats.

== College career ==
=== 2009 season ===
Shinskie played in all thirteen games of the 2009 Boston College season, starting the final ten games. He led the Eagles to the 2009 Emerald Bowl, where he completed 14 of 33 passes for 218 yards; the Eagles lost to USC 24–13. Shinskie threw for 2,049 yards and fifteen touchdowns during the season, setting Boston College freshman passing records.

=== 2010 season ===
Shinskie started the first three games of the 2010 season. Chase Rettig took over as the Eagles' starting quarterback for the latter part of the season.

=== 2011 season ===
Shinskie played in only two games in the 2011 season.
