= Tony Thurman =

American football player (born 1962)

No. 17
- Position: Defensive back

Personal information
- Listed height: 6 ft 0 in (1.83 m)
- Listed weight: 179 lb (81 kg)

Career information
- College: Boston College (1981–1984)

Awards and highlights
- Consensus All-American (1984); First-team All-East (1984)

Tony Thurman is an American former college football defensive back who played for the Boston College Eagles. He was a consensus All-American in 1984.

== Early life ==
Thurman played high school football at Lynn Classical High School in Lynn, Massachusetts as a quarterback.

== College career ==
Thurman played college football for the Boston College Eagles of Boston College. He was initially planning on playing quarterback at Boston College, and even practiced a few weeks at wide receiver, before permanently switching to defensive back. He was a four-year letterman from 1981 to 1984. He recorded two interceptions for 52 yards in 1981, six interceptions for 139 yards in 1982, and six interceptions for 45 yards in 1983. As a senior in 1984, he led the country and set a school record with 12 interceptions, earning consensus All-American honors. Thurman was also named first-team All-East by the Associated Press for the 1984 season. The 1984 Boston College Eagles finished the year fifth in the AP Poll with a 10–2 record. Thurman finished his college career with a school-record 26 interceptions.

Thurman was inducted into the Boston College Varsity Club Athletic Hall of Fame in 1992. His "jersey" was retired by Boston College in 1998. He was named an ACC Legend in 2010.

== Professional career ==
Thurman signed with the Miami Dolphins in May 1985 after going undrafted in the 1985 NFL draft. He was cut by the Dolphins on July 30, 1985.
