= Frank Spaziani =

American football player and coach (born 1947)

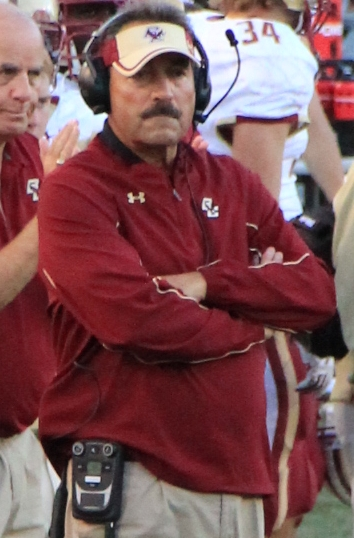
- Spaziani in 2012

Biographical details
- Born: April 1, 1947 (age 79); Clark, New Jersey, U.S.

Playing career
- 1965–1968: Penn State
- Positions: Linebacker, quarterback

Coaching career (HC unless noted)
- 1969: Penn State (GA)
- 1975–1977: Navy (TE/OT)
- 1977–1981: Navy (DB)
- 1982–1985: Virginia (DB)
- 1985–1991: Virginia (DB/DC)
- 1992–1993: Winnipeg Blue Bombers (DC)
- 1994–1996: Calgary Stampeders (DC)
- 1997–1998: Boston College (RB)
- 1999–2008: Boston College (DC)
- 2009–2012: Boston College
- 2016–2021: New Mexico State (DC)

Head coaching record
- Overall: 22–29
- Bowls: 1–2

Frank Joseph Spaziani (born April 1, 1947) is an American football coach and former player. He served as the head football coach at Boston College from 2009 to 2012, compiling a record of 22 wins and 29 losses. Prior to becoming head coach, Spaziani served on the Eagles' coaching staff for 12 years, the last 10 as defensive coordinator. He also served as defensive coordinator at New Mexico State from 2016 to 2021.

== Early life and playing career ==
Spaziani is a native of Clark, New Jersey and a graduate of Arthur L. Johnson High School. Spaziani played quarterback and linebacker for the Penn State Nittany Lions from 1965 to 1968. He was a member of the teams that went to the 1967 Gator Bowl and the 1969 Orange Bowl. He was the subject of one of Joe Paterno's notable early quotes: the Nittany Lions' coach said of Spaziani, "Don't get the idea that I like him because he's Italian. I like him because I'm Italian."

Spaziani was also a starting pitcher for the Penn State baseball team.

== Coaching career ==
=== Canadian Football League ===
Spaziani coached in the Canadian Football League (CFL) as a defensive coordinator for the Winnipeg Blue Bombers (two seasons) and Calgary Stampeders (three years). He helped to lead the Blue Bombers to the 1992 and 1993 Grey Cups and the Stampeders to the 83rd Grey Cup in 1995.

=== Boston College ===
In 1997, Spaziani left the Calgary Stampeders for a position as running backs coach for the Boston College Eagles. Coached by Spaziani, Boston College's Mike Cloud was a consensus first-team All-America selection and a finalist for the 1998 Doak Walker Award. Cloud also set a Big East and school single-season rushing record with 1,726 yards in 1998.

In 1999, he replaced Tim Rose as defensive coordinator, becoming Boston College's seventh defensive coordinator in the 1990s.

In 2001, the Boston College defense ranked 12th nationally in passing defense, 10th in pass efficiency defense, 19th in scoring defense and 25th in total defense. In 2002, they were ranked 13th nationally in passing defense, 25th in pass efficiency defense, 23rd in scoring defense and 37th in total defense. In 2003, they were ranked second in the Big East in total defense and second in rushing defense. In 2004, they were ranked first in the Big East. The Eagles ranked second in the Big East and 31st in the country in total defense and first in the Big East and 12th in the country in scoring defense. Mathias Kiwanuka was the 2004 Big East Defensive Player of the Year.

Spaziani was named interim head coach for Boston College twice. In December 2006, after the departure of Tom O'Brien, he coached Boston College to a win versus Navy on December 30, 2006, in the Meineke Car Care Bowl. However, Jeff Jagodzinski was hired as the permanent head coach. Spaziani was also named interim coach after Jagodzinski was fired on January 7, 2009, for interviewing for the open head coaching position with the New York Jets. Known for concocting elaborate defensive schemes, "Spaz" was given an honorary PhD from the school in 2008. On January 13, 2009, Spaziani was officially hired as the Eagles' permanent head coach.

Spaziani was fired on November 25, 2012, following a season in which Boston College went 2–10, the worst record since 1978.

=== New Mexico State ===
On January 8, 2016, Spanziani was hired to be the defensive coordinator for the New Mexico State Aggies football team.

== Personal life ==
Spaziani is married to Laura Spaziani (née Heikel); they have two sons and one daughter. They reside in Hingham, Massachusetts. He is a brother of Sigma Pi fraternity International.

== Head coaching record ==
Year	Team	Overall	Conference	Standing	Bowl/playoffs	Coaches^{#}	AP^{°}
Boston College Eagles (Atlantic Coast Conference) (2006)
2006	Boston College	1–0 (Note: Tom O'Brien coached the first 12 games of the season before resigning.)	0–0		W Meineke Car Care	20	20
Boston College Eagles (Atlantic Coast Conference) (2009–2012)
2009	Boston College	8–5	5–3	2nd (Atlantic)	L Emerald		
2010	Boston College	7–6	4–4	T–4th (Atlantic)	L Fight Hunger		
2011	Boston College	4–8	3–5	5th (Atlantic)			
2012	Boston College	2–10	1–7	6th (Atlantic)			
Boston College:		22–29	13–19				
Total:		22–29					
^{#}Rankings from final Coaches Poll.; ^{°}Rankings from final AP Poll.
