= Boston College–Virginia Tech football rivalry =

American college football rivalry

- Boston College Eagles Virginia Tech Hokies
- First meeting: November 6, 1993; Boston College, 48–34
- Latest meeting: September 26, 2026; Virginia Tech, 21–14
- Next meeting: TBA

Statistics
- Total meetings: 34
- All-time series: Virginia Tech leads, 23–11
- Largest victory: Virginia Tech, 49–0 (2016)
- Longest win streak: Virginia Tech, 7 (1996–2002)
- Current win streak: Virginia Tech, 4 (2022–present)

Locations of Boston College and Virginia Tech

The Boston College–Virginia Tech football rivalry is an American college football rivalry between the Boston College Eagles and Virginia Tech Hokies.

== History ==
The rivalry began in 1993 with a 48–34 Boston College win in Chestnut Hill when the two teams began Big East conference round-robin play. When the two schools moved to the Atlantic Coast Conference the rivalry continued as the two schools were chosen as permanent cross-divisional rivals. The teams played twice in one season in both 2007 and 2008, as Boston College won the Atlantic division of the ACC in each of those years and Virginia Tech won the Coastal division. Although the Eagles defeated the Hokies in both the regular seasons of 2007 and 2008, Virginia Tech won the 2007 and 2008 ACC Championship Game played between the two schools. Virginia Tech leads the series 22–11.

== Game results ==
Boston College victories	Virginia Tech victories

No.	Date	Location	Winner	Score
1	November 6, 1993	Chestnut Hill, MA	Boston College	48–34
2	September 17, 1994	Chestnut Hill, MA	#18 Virginia Tech	12–7
3	September 7, 1995	Blacksburg, VA	Boston College	20–14
4	September 14, 1996	Chestnut Hill, MA	#19 Virginia Tech	45–7
5	October 11, 1997	Blacksburg, VA	#23 Virginia Tech	17–7
6	October 8, 1998	Chestnut Hill, MA	#17 Virginia Tech	17–0
7	November 26, 1999	Blacksburg, VA	#2 Virginia Tech	38–14
8	September 30, 2000	Chestnut Hill, MA	#4 Virginia Tech	48–34
9	October 13, 2001	Blacksburg, VA	#6 Virginia Tech	34–20
10	October 10, 2002	Chestnut Hill, MA	#4 Virginia Tech	28–23
11	November 22, 2003	Blacksburg, VA	Boston College	34–27
12	October 27, 2005	Blacksburg, VA	#3 Virginia Tech	30–10
13	October 12, 2006	Chestnut Hill, MA	Boston College	22–3
14	October 25, 2007	Blacksburg, VA	#2 Boston College	14–10
15	December 1, 2007	Jacksonville, FL	#5 Virginia Tech	30–16
16	October 18, 2008	Chestnut Hill, MA	Boston College	28–23
17	December 6, 2008	Tampa, FL	Virginia Tech	30–12
18	October 10, 2009	Blacksburg, VA	#5 Virginia Tech	48–14

No.	Date	Location	Winner	Score
19	September 25, 2010	Chestnut Hill, MA	Virginia Tech	19–0
20	October 22, 2011	Blacksburg, VA	#16 Virginia Tech	30–14
21	November 17, 2012	Chestnut Hill, MA	Virginia Tech	30–23^{OT}
22	November 2, 2013	Chestnut Hill, MA	Boston College	34–27
23	November 1, 2014	Blacksburg, VA	Boston College	33–31
24	October 31, 2015	Chestnut Hill, MA	Virginia Tech	26–10
25	September 17, 2016	Blacksburg, VA	Virginia Tech	49–0
26	October 7, 2017	Chestnut Hill, MA	#16 Virginia Tech	23–10
27	November 3, 2018	Blacksburg, VA	#22 Boston College	31–21
28	August 31, 2019	Chestnut Hill, MA	Boston College	35–28
29	October 17, 2020	Blacksburg, VA	#23 Virginia Tech	40–14
30	November 5, 2021	Chestnut Hill, MA	Boston College	17–3
31	September 10, 2022	Blacksburg, VA	Virginia Tech	27–10
32	November 11, 2023	Chestnut Hill, MA	Virginia Tech	48–22
33	October 17, 2024	Blacksburg, VA	Virginia Tech	42–21
34	September 26, 2026	Chestnut Hill, MA	Virginia Tech	21–14
Series: Virginia Tech leads 23–11

== See also ==
- List of NCAA college football rivalry games
