= 2008 Maryland Terrapins football team =

American college football season

2008 Maryland Terrapins football
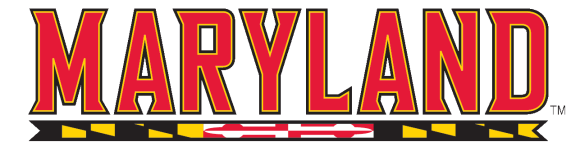

Humanitarian Bowl champion

Humanitarian Bowl, W 42–35 vs. Nevada
- Conference: Atlantic Coast Conference
- Atlantic Division
- Record: 8–5 (4–4 ACC)
- Head coach: Ralph Friedgen (8th season)
- Offensive coordinator: James Franklin (1st season)
- Offensive scheme: West Coast
- Defensive coordinator: Chris Cosh (3rd season; regular season); Al Seamonson (interim; bowl game)
- Base defense: "Terp" (3–3–5 variant)
- Home stadium: Byrd Stadium

2008 Atlantic Coast Conference football standings
	Conf.			Overall
Team	W		L	W		L
Atlantic Division
Boston College xy	5	–	3	9	–	5
No. 21 Florida State x	5	–	3	9	–	4
Maryland	4	–	4	8	–	5
Wake Forest	4	–	4	8	–	5
Clemson	4	–	4	7	–	6
NC State	4	–	4	6	–	7
Coastal Division
No. 15 Virginia Tech xy$	5	–	3	10	–	4
No. 22 Georgia Tech x	5	–	3	9	–	4
North Carolina	0	–	4	0	–	5
Miami (FL)	4	–	4	7	–	6
Virginia	3	–	5	5	–	7
Duke	1	–	7	4	–	8
Championship: Virginia Tech 30, Boston College 12
$ – BCS representative as conference champion; x – Division champion/co-champions; y – Championship game participant; North Carolina vacated 8 wins, including 4 ACC wins; Rankings from AP Poll

The 2008 Maryland Terrapins football team represented the University of Maryland in the 2008 NCAA Division I FBS football season. It was the Terrapins' (also officially known as the "Terps") 56th season as a member of the Atlantic Coast Conference (ACC) and its fourth within the framework of the ACC Atlantic Division.

Ralph Friedgen led the team for his eighth season as head coach and was assisted by first-year offensive coordinator James Franklin and third-year defensive coordinator Chris Cosh. It was the first season since the departure of Charlie Taaffe in 2005 that Friedgen did not call the offensive plays himself. Instead, those duties were handled by Franklin, a former Maryland wide receivers coach, who returned after a brief stint at Kansas State and in the National Football League (NFL). With him, Franklin brought a new system: the West Coast offense. Cosh, whose complex defensive scheme had been criticized as too passive, resigned at the end of the season.

The 2008 season in the ACC was described as chaotic, and for Maryland, there was no exception. The Terrapins were within grasp of the ACC Atlantic Division championship at the end of Week 12, but lost their final two games and fell to a four-way tie for third place. Maryland closed the regular season with a 7–5 record—including four wins against Top 25-ranked teams—which was enough to secure bowl eligibility. In the postseason, Maryland defeated Nevada of the Western Athletic Conference in the Humanitarian Bowl.

== Before the season ==
=== Coaching changes ===
In December 2007, Maryland hired Kansas State offensive coordinator James Franklin to serve in that same role for the Terrapins. From 2000 to 2004, he was the Maryland wide receivers coach. In 2003 and 2004, he also served as the recruiting coordinator, and Rivals.com ranked Franklin as one of the nation's top-25 recruiters both years. Because of the arrival of Franklin, 2008 was the first since 2005 that head coach Ralph Friedgen did not call the offensive plays himself. At Maryland, Franklin installed a West Coast offense, which was well suited to quarterback Chris Turner's playing style and an experienced wide receiver corps that included play-maker Darrius Heyward-Bey and sure-handed Danny Oquendo.

=== Key losses ===
Maryland lost several important players from the 2007 team. In January 2008, shortly after Oregon State defeated Maryland in the Emerald Bowl, linebacker Erin Henderson announced that he would forgo his senior year to enter the 2008 NFL draft. Henderson, the brother of Butkus and Bednarik Award winner E.J., had recorded an ACC-high four fumble recoveries in 2007 and was the Terrapins' leader in total tackles (133) and tackles for loss (11). The defensive line lost tackles Dre Moore and Carlos Feliciano, while the secondary unit lost both starting safeties, strong safety Christian Varner and free safety J. J. Justice, as well as cornerback Isaiah Gardner. The Maryland offense lost tailbacks Lance Ball and Keon Lattimore who combined for 1,573 rushing yards and 25 touchdowns in 2007. The offensive line saw the departure of tight ends Jason Goode and Joey Haynos, and offensive guard Andrew Crummey.

=== Key returns ===
Despite the loss of some of the previous year's important players, Maryland entered the 2008 season with a seasoned squad. Forty-six of sixty-two lettermen returned (74 percent), which included ten offensive and six defensive starters. The 2008 team contained 31 seniors, which was the largest group since Friedgen became head coach in 2001. Important returnees on the defensive unit included cornerback Kevin Barnes, who recorded four interceptions in 2007; defensive end Jeremy Navarre, who had recorded 5.5 sacks; and linebacker Dave Philistin, who had recorded 124 tackles. The offense's returning statistical leaders included quarterback Chris Turner, who threw for 1,958 passing yards in 2007; wide receiver Darrius Heyward-Bey, who had 786 receiving yards; and running back Da'Rel Scott, who had 135 rushing yards.

=== Recruiting ===
The 2008 recruiting class was ranked 52nd in the nation by Scout.com and 38th by Rivals.com. Scout.com rated three recruits as four-star and six as three-star prospects, while Rivals.com rated six recruits each as four-star and three-star prospects. Kenny Tate, who was originally recruited as a wide receiver, was the only four-star prospect to see significant playing time in 2008. Before the season, he was converted to safety, a position that had been attrited by the graduation of former starters Christian Varner and J.J. Justice, and Tate also saw action on special teams. Cornerback Cameron Chism, who saw action in nine games as a reserve, recorded seven tackles on kickoff returns to tie for second on the team in special teams tackles. Tight end Matt Furstenburg saw limited play time on special teams against Delaware and Middle Tennessee, but injured his foot and was awarded a medical redshirt. Wide receiver Kevin Dorsey also sat out the season as a redshirt to recuperate from foot surgery. The other four-star recruits who sat out on redshirt status were wide receiver Kerry Boykins, tight end Devonte Campbell, and defensive tackle Masengo Kabongo. Running back Davin Meggett, the son of former New York Giants star Dave Meggett, was the only true freshman to start a game for Maryland in 2008, and he was a significant contributor throughout the season. Meggett was not a highly touted recruit, assessed by Scout.com as a two-star prospect, and his only other scholarship offers were from local-area Division I FCS schools. In 2008, however, he led all ACC freshman with 5.13 yards per carry, and Megett finished the season with 457 yards and four touchdowns as a reserve.

=== Quarterback controversy ===
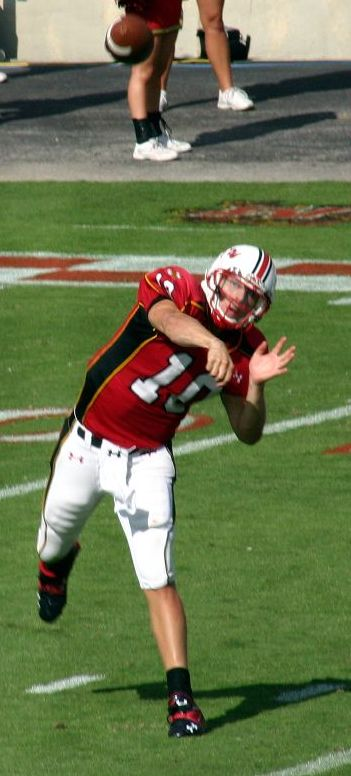
Eventual starter Chris Turner was at first relegated to the back-up position.

There was some controversy at the start of the season when head coach Ralph Friedgen selected senior Jordan Steffy as the starting quarterback over junior Chris Turner. In 2007, when Steffy suffered a concussion against 10th-ranked Rutgers, the relatively untested Turner took over and led Maryland to an upset victory. He then started the remainder of the season, compiled a 4–5 record in games he started, and led another upset against eighth-ranked Boston College. In comparing the practice performances of Steffy, Turner, and third-stringer Josh Portis, offensive coordinator James Franklin said:

It gets hard if one quarterback all through spring and all through summer camp was statistically better in almost every single category, it's hard to rationalize not making him the starter ... because your gut feeling is one thing and the statistics are another. Jordan led by a pretty large amount in completion percentage ... [and] the least interception percentage. He didn't lead in yards per [attempt or] ... percentage of explosive plays. I consider an explosive play a play of 16 yards or more ... Portis led in that and Turner was second and Jordan was third.

In the season opener against Delaware, Steffy suffered an injured thumb, and Turner took over in the fourth quarter. He remained the starter for the rest of the season, and Steffy saw no further game action. Portis saw limited playing time throughout the season, usually being put in for a single option play at a time.

== Schedule ==
The Sagarin computer rating system calculated Maryland's strength of schedule to be 36th-most difficult out of the 245 Division I teams. The Cosgrove Computer Rankings calculated it as the 56th-most difficult out of the 120 Division I FBS teams. In accordance with conference rules, Maryland faced all five Atlantic Division opponents: Boston College, Clemson, Florida State, NC State, and Wake Forest. They also faced three Coastal Division opponents: official ACC rival Virginia, North Carolina, and Virginia Tech. Virginia Tech and Boston College were the ACC champions and runners-up, respectively, in 2007 and again in 2008. Maryland did not play ACC opponents Duke, Georgia Tech, and Miami.

Maryland also played four non-conference games. For the season opener, the Terrapins met the 2007 Division I FCS runners-up, Delaware. California of the Pacific-10 Conference was played for the first time in school history as the first half of a home-and-home series. Athletic director Deborah Yow wanted to play one of the University of Maryland's five academic peer institutions, and to take a two-year hiatus from the 28-year series against West Virginia. She said, by adding California, "We weren't trying to add to the degree of difficulty [of Maryland's schedule]; we were trying to substitute for West Virginia." Games were also played against Middle Tennessee State of the Sun Belt Conference and Eastern Michigan of the Mid-American Conference. For the 2008 Humanitarian Bowl, Maryland played Nevada in the teams' first meeting.

Date	Time	Opponent	Rank	Site	TV	Result	Attendance
August 30	3:45 pm	Delaware*		Byrd Stadium; College Park, MD	ESPNU	W 14–7	49,119
September 6	7:00 pm	at Middle Tennessee*		Johnny "Red" Floyd Stadium; Murfreesboro, TN	CSS/CSN	L 14–24	22,605
September 13	12:00 pm	No. 23 California*		Byrd Stadium; College Park, MD	ESPN	W 35–27	49,527
September 20	1:00 pm	Eastern Michigan*		Byrd Stadium; College Park, MD	ESPN360	W 51–24	48,023
September 27	12:00 pm	at No. 20 Clemson		Memorial Stadium; Clemson, SC	Raycom	W 20–17	81,500
October 4	7:00 pm	at Virginia		Scott Stadium; Charlottesville, VA (rivalry)	ESPNU	L 0–31	50,727
October 18	12:00 pm	No. 21 Wake Forest		Byrd Stadium; College Park, MD	Raycom	W 26–0	46,257
October 25	3:30 pm	NC State^{†}		Byrd Stadium; College Park, MD	ESPN360	W 27–24	45,018
November 6	7:30 pm	at Virginia Tech	No. 23	Lane Stadium; Blacksburg, VA	ESPN	L 13–23	66,233
November 15	3:30 pm	No. 17 North Carolina		Byrd Stadium; College Park, MD	ABC	W 17–15	46,113
November 22	7:45 pm	Florida State	No. 22	Byrd Stadium; College Park, MD	ESPN	L 3–37	51,620
November 29	3:30 pm	at No. 20 Boston College		Alumni Stadium; Chestnut Hill, MA	ABC	L 21–28	42,767
December 30	4:30 pm	vs. Nevada*		Bronco Stadium; Boise, ID (Humanitarian Bowl)	ESPN	W 42–35	26,781
*Non-conference game; ^{†}Homecoming; Rankings from AP Poll released prior to the game; All times are in Eastern time

== Personnel ==
=== Injuries ===
Injuries had devastated the Maryland roster the previous year, and while 2008 was more forgiving by comparison, several key players were injured. Starting cornerback Kevin Barnes suffered a season-ending scapular fracture against Wake Forest and missed the last six games. Sophomore LaQuan Williams and true freshman Kevin Dorsey, both wide receivers, sat out the entire season due to leg and foot injuries, respectively. Leading receiver Darrius Heyward-Bey sat out the Boston College game due to a calf injury, and leading rusher Da'Rel Scott suffered a left shoulder injury in the third game against California, which plagued him throughout the season, although he missed just one game. Running back Morgan Green, who had contended for the starting position during summer camp, had an injury-riddled season, before seeing his first real action in the bowl game. Starting quarterback Jordan Steffy was put out for the season by a thumb injury on his throwing hand in the first game.

=== Depth chart ===
Information as of December 10, 2008
**OFFENSE** **X-receiver**: 82 **Torrey Smith – Fr-RS** ↑; 84 Isaiah Williams – Sr-3V ↓; 7 Adrian Cannon – So-1V; 85 Tony Logan – Fr-RS; **Left tackle**: **74 Bruce Campbell – So-1V** ↑; 71 Paul Pinegar – So-1V ↔; 73 Stephen St. John – Fr-RS; **Left guard**: **76 Jaimie Thomas – Sr-3V**; 78 Andrew Gonnella – Fr-RS ↑; 70 Lamar Young – Fr-RS ↓; **Center**: **60 Edwin Williams – Sr-3V**; 65 Danny Edwards – So-SQ; **Right guard**: **72 Phil Costa – Jr-1V**; 67 Jack Griffin – Sr-3V; 78 Justin Lewis – Fr-HS; **Right tackle**: **77 Scott Burley – Sr-3V** ↔; 75 Dane Randolph – Sr-3V ↓; 63 R.J. Dill – Fr-HS; **Tight end-Y**: **13 Dan Gronkowski – Sr-2V**; 45 Tommy Galt – Jr-1V; 89 Matt Furstenburg – Fr-HS ↔; **Quarterback**: **10 Chris Turner** – Jr-1V ↑; 19 Jordan Steffy – Sr-3V ↓*; 12 Josh Portis – Jr-SQ; 11 Jamarr Robinson – Fr-RS; **Tailback**: **23 Da'Rel Scott** – So-1V; 41 Davin Meggett – Fr-HS; 5 Morgan Green – So-SQ; 16 Rashad Henry – Sr-SQ; 25 Dan Bonato – So-SQ; **Fullback**: **38 Cory Jackson – Jr-2V**; 36 Taylor Watson – Fr-RS ↑; 30 Haroon Brown – So-1V ↓; **Z-receiver**: **8 Darrius Heyward-Bey – Jr-2V**; 83 Emani Lee-Odai – So-1V; 88 Quinton McCree – Fr-RS; **F-receiver**: **17 Danny Oquendo – Sr-3V**; 24 Ronnie Tyler – Fr-RS; **Tight end-F**: **80 Lansford Watson – Fr-RS**	**DEFENSE** **Defensive end**: **40 Jeremy Navarre – Sr-3V** ↔; 91 Mack Frost – Sr-3V ↓; 57 Jared Harrell – Jr-SQ; **Nose tackle**: **92 Dion Armstrong – Fr-RS** ↑; 96 Olugbemi Otulaja – Sr-1V ↓; 98 A.J. Francis – Fr-HS; **Defensive tackle**: **90 Travis Ivey – Jr-1V**; 97 Dean Muhtadi – Sr-1V ↔; **LEO linebacker**: **55 Trey Covington – Sr-3V**; 58 Derek Drummond – Fr-RS; 47 Jeff Clement – Jr-1V; **SAM linebacker**: **48 Moise Fokou – Sr-2V**; 20 Antwine Perez – So-TR; 51 Aaron Ball – Sr-SQ; **MIKE linebacker**: **33 Alex Wujciak – So-SQ**; 44 Chase Bullock – Sr-1V ↔; 45 Alex Schultz – Sr-SQ; **WILL linebacker**: **34 Dave Philistin – Sr-3V**; 54 Adrian Moten – So-1V ↔; 59 Demetrius Hartsfield – Fr-HS; 53 Hakeen Sule – Jr-SQ; **Cornerback**: **6 Anthony Wiseman – Jr-2V**; 37 Cameron Chism – Fr-HS; 26 Michael Carter – Fr-RS ↔; 21 Trenton Hughes – Fr-RS; **Free safety**: **1 Terrell Skinner – Jr-2V**; 22 Drew Robinson – Sr-1V; 15 Austin Walker – Fr-RS; **Strong safety**: **29 Jeff Allen – Sr-3V**; 18 Kenny Tate – Fr-HS ↔; **Cornerback**: **14 Nolan Carroll – Jr-2V** *; 4 Jamari McCollough – Jr-SQ ↔	**SPECIAL TEAMS** **Placekicker**: **39 Obi Egekeze – Sr-2V**; 32 Nick Wallace – So-TR; 81 David May – Sr-SQ; 26 Mike Barbour – Fr-RS; **Kickoff specialist**: **39 Obi Egekeze – Sr-2V**; 81 David May – Sr-SQ; 35 Travis Baltz – So-1V; 32 Nick Wallace – So-TR; **Punter**: **35 Travis Baltz – So-1V**; 37 Ted Townsley – So-TR; **Punt returner**: **17 Danny Oquendo – Sr-3V**; 18 Kenny Tate – Fr-HS; **Kick returner**: **82 Torrey Smith – Fr-RS**; 18 Kenny Tate – Fr-HS; **Holder**: **35 Travis Baltz – So-1V**; 11 Jamarr Robinson – Fr-RS; **Long snapper**: **31 Andrew Schmitt – Sr-3V**; 64 Tim Downs – Fr-RS; **Deep snapper**: **31 Andrew Schmitt – Sr-3V**; 64 Tim Downs – Fr-RS
		Injured: (injured) OL 79 Tyler Bowen – Fr-RS; (injured) WR 3 LaQuan Williams – So-1V; (injured) WR 25 Kevin Dorsey – Fr-HS; (injured) LB 42 Ben Pooler – Fr-RS; (injured) **DB 2 Kevin Barnes – Sr-3V**; (injured) DB 9 Richard Taylor – Sr-2V; (injured) DB 27 Dominique Herald – So-1V
Fr: Freshman; So: Sophomore; Jr: Junior; Sr: Senior; V: Number of prior seasons varsity experience RS: Redshirt status prior season TR: Sat out prior season due to NCAA transfer rules SQ: Practice squad prior season HS: High school experience only	**Boldface** indicates a starting player for the respective position. An "up" arrow (↑) indicates upward movement in depth chart position from earlier in the season. A "down" arrow (↓) indicates downward movement in depth chart position from earlier in the season. A horizontal arrow (↔) indicates movement to a different position from earlier in the season. An asterisk (*) indicates that the player recovered from an injury to take a place on the depth chart.

Depth chart as of September 28, 2008

**Bold** indicates starter as of September 28, 2008
**OFFENSE** **X-receiver**: **84 Isaiah Williams** – Sr-3V; 82 Torrey Smith – Fr-RS; 7 Adrian Cannon – So-1V; 85 Tony Logan – Fr-RS; **Left tackle**: **77 Scott Burley – Sr-3V**; 74 Bruce Campbell – So-1V; 73 Stephen St. John – Fr-RS; **Left guard**: **76 Jaimie Thomas** – Sr-3V; 70 Lamar Young – Fr-RS; 78 Andrew Gonnella – Fr-RS; **Center**: **60 Edwin Williams** – Sr-3V; 65 Danny Edwards – So-SQ; 64 Justin Gilbert – Fr-HS; **Right guard**: **72 Phil Costa** – Jr-1V; 67 Jack Griffin – Sr-3V; 78 Justin Lewis – Fr-HS; 61 Lee Oliver – Sr-SQ; **Right tackle**: **75 Dane Randolph** – Sr-3V; 71 Paul Pinegar – So-1V; 63 R.J. Dill – Fr-HS; **Tight end**: **13 Dan Gronkowski** – Sr-2V; 45 Tommy Galt; **Quarterback**: **10 Chris Turner** – Jr-1V; 12 Josh Portis – Jr-SQ; 11 Jamarr Robinson – Fr-RS; **Tailback**: **23 Da'Rel Scott** – So-1V; 41 Davin Meggett – Fr-HS; 5 Morgan Green – So-SQ; 16 Rashad Henry – Sr-SQ; 25 Dan Bonato – So-SQ; **Fullback**: **38 Cory Jackson** – Jr-2V; 30 Haroon Brown – So-1V; 36 Taylor Watson – Fr-RS; **Z-receiver**: **8 Darrius Heyward-Bey** – Jr-2V; 83 Emani Lee-Odai – So-1V; 88 Quinton McCree – Fr-RS; **F-receiver**: **17 Danny Oquendo** – Sr-3V; 24 Ronnie Tyler – Fr-RS; 81 Kerry Boykins – Fr-HS; **TE-F**: **80 Lansford Watson** – Fr-RS; 89 Matt Furstenburg – Fr-HS; 86 Devonte Campbell – Fr-HS; Injured: QB 19 Jordan Steffy – Sr-3V; OL 79 Tyler Bowen – Fr-RS; OL 69 Joe Faiella – Fr-RS; WR 25 Kevin Dorsey – Fr-HS; WR 3 LaQuan Williams – So-1V	**DEFENSE** **Defensive end**: **91 Mack Frost** – Sr-3V; 97 Dean Muhtadi – Sr-1V; 57 Jared Harrell – Jr-SQ; 56 Deege Galt – Jr-SQ; **Nose tackle**: **96 Olugbemi Otulaja** – Sr-1V; 92 Dion Armstrong – Fr-RS; 98 A.J. Francis – Fr-HS; **Defensive tackle**: **40 Jeremy Navarre** – Sr-3V; 90 Travis Ivey – Jr-1V; 93 Ian Davidson – Fr-RS; **LEO**: **55 Trey Covington** – Sr-3V; 43 Rick Costa – Sr-2V; 58 Derek Drummond – Fr-RS; 47 Jeff Clement – Jr-1V; **SAM**: 48 **Moise Fokou** – Sr-2V; 54 Adrian Moten – So-1V; 20 Antwine Perez – So-TR; 51 Aaron Ball – Sr-SQ; 19 Femi Akinwande – Jr-SQ; **MIKE**: **33 Alex Wujciak** – So-SQ; 45 Alex Schultz – Sr-SQ; **WILL**: **34 Dave Philistin** – Sr-3V; 44 Chase Bullock – Sr-1V; 59 Demetrius Hartsfield – Fr-HS; 53 Hakeen Sule – Jr-SQ; **Cornerback**: **6 Anthony Wiseman** – Jr-2V; 37 Cameron Chism – Fr-HS; 21 Trenton Hughes – Fr-RS; **Free safety**: **1 Terrell Skinner** – Jr-2V; 18 Kenny Tate – Fr-HS; 22 Drew Robinson – Sr-1V; 15 Austin Walker – Fr-RS; **Strong safety**: **29 Jeff Allen** – Sr-3V; 4 Jamari McCollough – Jr-SQ; **Cornerback**: **2 Kevin Barnes** – Sr-3V; 26 Michael Carter – Fr-RS; Injured: DL 95 Joe Vellano – Fr-HS; DL 99 Carl Russell – Fr-HS; LB 42 Ben Pooler – Fr-RS; DB 14 Nolan Carroll – Jr-2V; DB 9 Richard Taylor – Sr-2V; DB 27 Dominique Herald – So-1V	**SPECIAL TEAMS** **Placekicker**: **39 Obi Egekeze** – Sr-2V; 32 Nick Wallace – So-TR; 81 David May – Sr-SQ; 26 Mike Barbour – Fr-RS; **Kickoff specialist**: **39 Obi Egekeze** – Sr-2V; 81 David May – Sr-SQ; 35 Travis Baltz – So-1V; 32 Nick Wallace – So-TR; **Punter**: **35 Travis Baltz** – So-1V; 37 Ted Townsley – So-TR; **Punt returner**: **17 Danny Oquendo** – Sr-3V; 18 Kenny Tate – Fr-HS; **Kick returner**: **82 Torrey Smith** – Fr-RS; 18 Kenny Tate – Fr-HS; **Holder**: **35 Travis Baltz** – So-1V; 11 Jamarr Robinson – Fr-RS; **Long snapper**: **31 Andrew Schmitt** – Sr-3V; 64 Tim Downs – Fr-RS; **Deep snapper**: **31 Andrew Schmitt** – Sr-3V; 64 Tim Downs – Fr-RS

=== Coaching staff ===
Name	Position	Current seasons	Previous seasons	Alma mater
Ralph Friedgen	Head coach	8	5	Maryland (1970)
James Franklin	Assistant head coach, offensive coordinator, quarterbacks coach	1	5	East Stroudsburg (1995)
Chris Cosh^{†}	Defensive coordinator, inside linebackers coach (regular season)	3	1	Virginia Tech (1983)
Lee Hull	Wide receivers coach	1	–	Holy Cross (1988)
Tom Brattan	Offensive line coach	8	–	Delaware (1972)
John Donovan	Running backs coach	8	–	Johns Hopkins (1997)
Kevin Lempa	Secondary coach	2	–	Southern Connecticut State (1974)
Al Seamonson^{‡}	Outside linebackers coach, special teams assistant	7	–	Wisconsin (1982)
Al Seamonson^{‡}	Interim defensive coordinator (bowl game)	7	–	Wisconsin (1982)
Dave Sollazzo	Defensive line coach, recruiting coordinator	8	3	The Citadel (1977)
Danny Pearman^{†}	Special teams, tight ends (regular season)	1	—	Clemson (1988)
Dwight Galt	Strength and conditioning coach	17	6	Maryland (1981)
Brian White^{‡}	Intern	3	—	Juniata College
Brian White^{‡}	Interim tight ends, assistant special teams (bowl game)	3	—	Juniata College
Legend
A vacated position An interim position	A dagger (†) indicates an individual who resigned before the post-season.; A double-dagger (‡) indicates an individual who filled a role on an interim basis.			

== Game summaries ==
=== Delaware ===
	1	2	3	4	Total
Delaware	0	0	0	7	7
Maryland	0	7	7	0	14

- Opponent pre-game record: 0–0
- Opponent final record: 4–8
- Pre-game line: Lines are not released for games between FBS and FCS teams

The previous season, Delaware finished as the Division I FCS championship runners-up and scored more than 40 points in seven of 15 games. However, their star quarterback, Joe Flacco, and running back, Omar Cuff, both graduated and went on to the NFL. Later in the season, the Blue Hens finished 2008 with eight losses for the first time in school history.

Delaware kicked off to start the game, and wide receiver Torrey Smith returned the ball 23 yards to the Maryland 32-yard line. Quarterback Jordan Steffy then led a Maryland drive, but the series ended when placekicker Obi Egekeze missed a 48-yard field goal attempt. On the next Maryland possession, Egekeze missed another field goal attempt, this time of 45 yards. The teams then exchanged several punts before Maryland took over on the Delaware 48-yard line. Steffy completed a 36-yard pass to Darrius Heyward-Bey, which set up a 12-yard touchdown rush also by Heyward-Bey. Delaware drove 44 yards, but then missed their own 46-yard field goal attempt. With 3:33 left in the half, Steffy engineered a 47-yard drive to set up a 41-yard field goal attempt, which Egekeze missed for the third time. On the first play of the second half, Delaware quarterback Rob Schoenhoft threw an interception to cornerback Kevin Barnes, who returned it 10 yards to the Delaware 46-yard line. On the next play, Steffy threw an interception to Erik Johnson, who returned it to the Maryland 49-yard line. The Terrapins' next possession ended when, fourth and 18, Steffy threw another interception at the Delaware one-yard line. Incidentally, this put the Blue Hens in worse field position than if the Terrapins had turned over on downs. Soon after, Delaware punted the ball away. Running back Da'Rel Scott then rushed for a 30-yard gain, which set up a 14-yard touchdown run by running back Davin Meggett. Chris Turner took over as Maryland's quarterback on the second series of the fourth quarter after Steffy fractured his right thumb. On Delaware's subsequent possession, Schoenhoft engineered an 80-yard drive, which culminated with a one-yard touchdown rush by running back Johnathan Smith. With 3:20 on the clock, Schoenhoft threw an interception to safety Terrell Skinner. Turner then scrambled for a first down, and Scott converted for a second first down, which allowed Maryland to run out the game clock. Maryland won, with a final score of 14–7.

In his first career start, Scott ran for 157 yards, but Friedgen thought he could have done better. Friedgen said, "He was a little tired from camp ... Normally, he would break some of those runs. I don't think he quite had his third gear today." Steffy played a solid first half, but in the second, threw two interceptions before suffering a season-ending thumb fracture. He was replaced by back-up Chris Turner who started for the remainder of the season. Regarding their loss, Delaware head coach K. C. Keeler said, "This is not like a moral victory. I don't believe in moral victories ... This was not a payday for us ... We play a home game, we make more money than playing this game down here. When we scheduled this game, I thought our program would possibly be in a position to beat a solid ACC school."

=== Middle Tennessee State ===
	1	2	3	4	Total
Maryland	7	0	7	0	14
MTSU	7	3	14	0	24

- Opponent pre-game record: 0–1
- Opponent final record: 5–7
- Pre-game line: Maryland −13

The previous week, Middle Tennessee made two rapid-fire fourth-quarter touchdowns in a failed comeback attempt against the eventual Sun Belt Conference champions, Troy. The week following the Maryland game, Middle Tennessee nearly upset Kentucky. The Blue Raiders lost that game, 20–14, after wide receiver Eldred King caught a 61-yard pass only to be ankle-tackled at the Kentucky one-yard line as time expired.

After receiving the kickoff, Middle Tennessee quarterback Joe Craddock led an 80-yard, 10-play drive. It included a fake punt that caught Maryland off-guard, which allowed the punter to complete a 28-yard pass for a first-down conversion. Craddock ended the drive with a 5-yard touchdown pass. On Maryland's second offensive play of the game, Da'Rel Scott broke free for a 63-yard run for a touchdown. In the second quarter, Middle Tennessee re-took the lead with a 31-yard field goal. In the third quarter, Turner threw an interception that was returned 25 yards to the Maryland five-yard line, and Middle Tennessee subsequently scored on a rushing play. On Maryland's next possession, Turner completed a short pass to Darrius Heyward-Bey who ran for an 80-yard touchdown. In the fourth quarter, Maryland advanced inside the Middle Tennessee 35-yard line three times, but was unable to capitalize. Middle Tennessee defenders saved two potential touchdowns with interceptions on their own two-yard line and in the end zone to preserve a Blue Raider victory, 24–14.

The game marked Middle Tennessee's first ever win over an ACC opponent, although they had come close in Charlottesville the year prior, when Virginia made a go-ahead field goal with eight seconds remaining. It was Middle Tennessee's fourth win against an opponent from a Bowl Championship Series (BCS) conference. The other three all came against Vanderbilt.

=== California (#23) ===
	1	2	3	4	Total
#23 California	3	3	0	21	27
Maryland	14	7	7	7	35

- Opponent pre-game record: 2–0
- Opponent final record: 9–4
- Pre-game line: Maryland +14

The Washington Post called the previous week's ten-point loss to Middle Tennessee the "worst defeat of [Ralph Friedgen's] eight-year tenure," and with the narrow margin of victory over Delaware, most analysts strongly favored 23-ranked California in its first meeting against Maryland. The previous week, California routed Washington State, 66–3.

The game began with a Maryland kickoff to California, who were stopped for a net loss of 4 yards and forced to punt. On Maryland's first possession, it mounted a 60-yard drive that culminated in a 24-yard touchdown rush by Da'Rel Scott. California quarterback Kevin Riley then threw an interception to cornerback Kevin Barnes, which allowed Scott to rush for his second score of the game. California made a field goal, but on the following series, Maryland drove 60 yards and tight end Dan Gronkowski made a touchdown reception. The Golden Bears made another field goal to end the first half with a score of 21–6, in Maryland's favor. During the second quarter, Riley threw a short screen pass to running back Jahvid Best, who immediately received a hard hit from Maryland cornerback Kevin Barnes. While still lying on the field, Best rolled to his side to vomit. Footage of the tackle and its aftermath circulated widely on the internet and became a viral video phenomenon. In the third period, Chris Turner completed a pass to Darrius Heyward-Bey for a 27-yard touchdown to end the quarter with Maryland in the lead, 28–6. In the final period, California scored two touchdowns against a preventative defense, before Maryland responded with a fifth score on a one-yard rush by Davin Meggett. In the final minutes, Maryland placekicker Obi Egekeze missed a 27-yard field goal which might have clinched the victory. Instead, California scored a third touchdown to close within eight points. With 1:55 remaining to play, California attempted an onside kick, but it bounced out of bounds, and Maryland was able to run out the clock to finish the upset, 35–28.

The Maryland offense scored five touchdowns against California, which bettered the combined total of four in the Terrapins' first two games. California running back Jahvid Best, an early Heisman Trophy contender, ran for 311 yards in his first two games, but was held to 25 yards on 10 carries against Maryland. In total, California's rushing offense was held to 38 yards. This was the first of four Maryland victories over ranked opponents during the 2008 season.

=== Eastern Michigan ===
	1	2	3	4	Total
Eastern Michigan	0	14	3	7	24
Maryland	10	14	10	17	51

- Opponent pre-game record: 1–2
- Opponent final record: 3–9
- Pre-game line: Maryland −21

Against Mid-American Conference opponent Eastern Michigan, Maryland showcased its offense, which scored on nine out of thirteen possessions. Starting tailback Da'Rel Scott sat out the game because of a shoulder injury suffered against California, and he was replaced by Morgan Green.

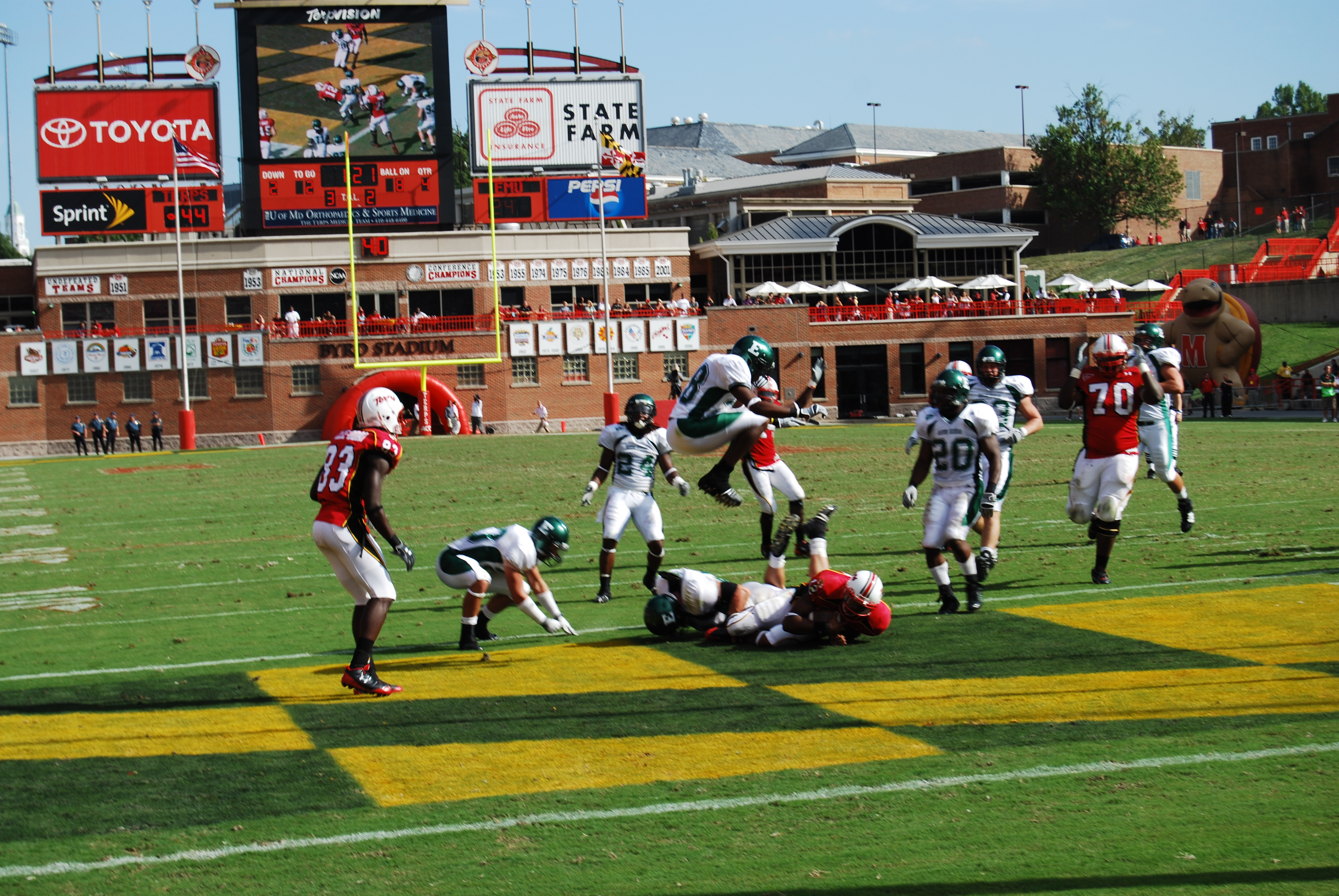
Quarterback Josh Portis rushes for the final touchdown against Eastern Michigan.

Linebacker Adrian Moten blocked an Eastern Michigan punt, which gave Maryland excellent field position for their first possession on their opponents' 10-yard line. They were, however, were held to a field goal. Eastern Michigan responded with a 75-yard drive to the Maryland five-yard line, but threw an interception to safety Jamari McCollough. Maryland mounted an 80-yard drive, which included a 35-yard run by Darrius Heyward-Bey and culminated in a one-yard touchdown by Morgan Green. After both teams suffered "three-and-out" possessions, Eastern Michigan quarterback Kyle McMahon threw a second interception to Moten, which set up a second touchdown by Green. Eastern Michigan drove 80 yards in 11 plays, and running back Terrence Blevins ran for a touchdown to bring the score to 17–7. Torrey Smith returned the ensuing 59-yard kickoff 57 yards, which set up a 32-yard touchdown pass from Chris Turner to Heyward-Bey. Eastern Michigan then drove 80 yards for another touchdown. On the subsequent Maryland possession, Turner threw an interception to end the half with the score of 24–14. On the kickoff to start the second half, Smith returned the ball 27 yards. On the next play, Heyward-Bey gained 47 yards on a rush attempt, which set up a short touchdown pass to tight end Dan Gronkowski. On the next two series, the teams traded field goals which brought the score to 34–17. Turner threw another interception to start the fourth quarter, but linebacker Trey Covington then recorded a quarterback sack, which forced Eastern Michigan to turnover on downs. Turner was then sacked himself, and Maryland kicked a field goal. Eastern Michigan engineered an 80-yard drive for a touchdown, and closed the deficit to 37–24. Maryland reserve quarterback Josh Portis execute a lateral to wide receiver Danny Oquendo who in turn passed to receiver Isaiah Williams, which gained a 43-yard touchdown. Eastern Michigan was subsequently forced to punt, and Portis rushed 80 yards over six plays for the final touchdown. In the next series, Jamari McCoullough intercepted an Eastern Michigan pass to end the game, 51–24.

=== Clemson (#20) ===
	1	2	3	4	Total
Maryland	0	6	7	7	20
#20 Clemson	10	7	0	0	17

- Opponent pre-game record: 3–1
- Opponent final record: 7–6
- Pre-game line: Maryland +12

Maryland traveled to Clemson to play in "Death Valley", traditionally one of the most difficult ACC venues for opponents to play. Clemson firmly held the momentum of the game for the first half, and their running backs exploited holes in the Maryland defensive line. During that time, Clemson recorded two touchdowns and a field goal. Despite gaining excellent field position through recovering a fumbled punt on the Clemson 19-yard line and a recovered fumble on the Clemson 30-yard line, Maryland was able to produce just two field goals from those turnovers. The Terrapins drives were also blunted by penalties for two false starts and a holding call.

In the first possession of the second half, the Terrapins were forced to punt after a run attempt for loss, a false start penalty, and two incomplete passes. The Maryland defense took the field and stopped a Clemson drive. On the first play of their second series, wide receiver Darrius Heyward-Bey executed a reverse to gain 76 yards before being stopped at the Clemson four-yard line. This set up a short Chris Turner touchdown pass to receiver Torrey Smith, and shifted the game's momentum in favor of Maryland. In the fourth quarter, three completions to Danny Oquendo set the stage for a one-yard rush into the endzone by Da'Rel Scott. In the second half, the Maryland defense allowed Clemson just 31 rushing yards and zero points, compared with 204 rushing yards and 17 points in the first half.

The upset marked the fourth consecutive Maryland win against a ranked opponent (the others: #23 Cal, and, in the 2007 season, #8 Boston College and #10 Rutgers). It was also the fourth consecutive time that the visiting team has won the Maryland–Clemson series.

=== Virginia ===
	1	2	3	4	Total
Maryland	0	0	0	0	0
Virginia	7	14	10	0	31

- Opponent pre-game record: 1–3
- Opponent final record: 5–7
- Pre-game line: Maryland −13.5

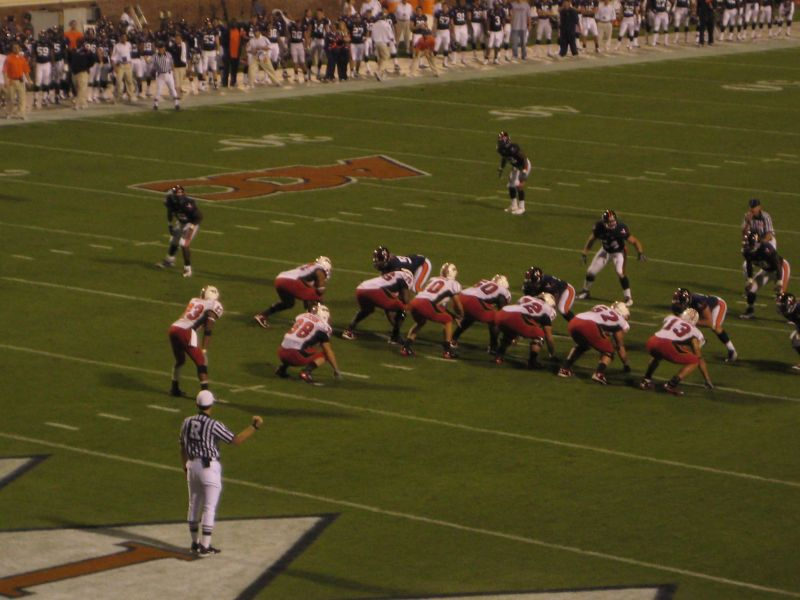
Maryland lines up in an I-formation against Virginia.

Virginia went into the game with a 1–3 record and at the bottom of the ACC. They mustered only 36 points (and just 20 points against Division I FBS teams) in the previous four games, while allowing their opponents 128 points. Their last game had been a 31–3 defeat at the hands of Duke, which finally broke the Blue Devils' 25-game ACC losing streak.

The Maryland offense had difficulty converting third downs, and managed only four on 13 attempts, while their defense allowed 226 passing yards and 201 rushing yards. Late in the first quarter, Virginia quarterback Marc Verica completed a pass to receiver Kevin Ogletree for a 51-yard touchdown, the Cavs' first passing score of the season. Virginia was able to score twice more before half, to put the Terrapins into a 21–0 deficit. With seconds left in the second quarter, in a desperate gambit to recoup some points, quarterback Chris Turner attempted a hook and ladder play with a pass to Isaiah Williams who then lateraled to Darrius Heyward-Bey, who in turn lateraled to Da'Rel Scott. The maneuver picked up 45 yards before Scott was shoved out of bounds, and a flag was thrown for a late hit by Virginia. Since a half cannot end on a defensive penalty, time would have been added to the clock, but it was ruled that the foul occurred after time had expired. Therefore, the penalty was assessed after the kick-off, and the Terrapins' trick play was for naught.

In the third quarter, things got worse for Maryland as the Cavaliers added a field goal and another touchdown. In a final drive for 46 yards, Maryland attempted to avert a shutout. The effort fell short when a Turner pass was intercepted. The final result was 31–0.

It was the first time Maryland was shut out since 2004, when they were similarly defeated by Virginia in Charlottesville, 16–0. It was Maryland's worst shutout loss since losing to Virginia in 1997, 45–0, and the largest margin of loss since losing to Virginia Tech in 2004, 55–6.

=== Wake Forest (#21) ===
	1	2	3	4	Total
#21 Wake Forest	0	0	0	0	0
Maryland	7	6	6	7	26

- Opponent pre-game record: 4–1
- Opponent final record: 8–5
- Pre-game line: Maryland +1.5

After an embarrassing 31–0 loss against struggling Virginia, the Terrapins continued their inconsistent season against nationally ranked Atlantic Division front-runner 21st-ranked Wake Forest.

Maryland first scored with a halfback option, when Chris Turner pitched to Da'Rel Scott, who connected with Darrius Heyward-Bey for a nine-yard pass into the end zone. In the second and third quarters, Maryland placekicker Obi Egekeze made four field goals. In the final quarter, Danny Oquendo brought down a short pass from Turner and ran it in past two defenders for a touchdown totaling 50 yards.

Against Wake Forest's best-ranked pass defense in the nation, Chris Turner threw for a season-high of 321 yards and a career-best 68% completion rate (28–41). Maryland running back Da'Rel Scott twice fumbled to give Wake Forest excellent field position, but both opportunities were wasted with missed field goal attempts. Wake Forest's leading scorer, placekicker Sam Swank, was out due to injury.

Ralph Friedgen stated that "We finally put a full game together. I think by far it's the best we've played all year." It was Maryland's fifth consecutive defeat of a ranked opponent, and the third of the season, making them 3–0 against ranked opponents, but just 2–2 against all others. The game also marked the first time that Wake Forest had been held scoreless in 124 games when it lost to Air Force in 1998, and it was the first time since 1957 that the Terrapins had bounced back to shut out an opponent following a shutout of their own. The last Maryland shutout of a ranked opponent was in 1955 against UCLA.

=== NC State ===
	1	2	3	4	Total
NC State	7	10	7	0	24
Maryland	7	10	7	3	27

- Opponent pre-game record: 2–5
- Opponent final record: 6–7
- Pre-game line: Maryland −12

In a frigid driving rain at College Park, NC State brought an inspired effort in an attempt to break a three-game losing streak. In the first series of the game, the Wolfpack used 14 plays and 8 minutes to drive 73 yards and score first. Maryland immediately responded with a drive that ended with a 13-yard Turner pass to Dan Gronkowski. In the following series, NC State again scored a touchdown, and Maryland kicked a field goal in response. NC State running back Andre Brown fumbled on the first play, and Maryland recovered on the Wolfpack 24-yard line. The Terrapins capitalized on the turnover with a Davin Meggett run into the endzone. After a Wolfpack field goal, the score was even at halftime, 17–17. In the third quarter, Maryland running back Da'Rel Scott rushed 24 yards for a touchdown. Late in the quarter, Danny Oquendo fumbled a punt return on the 50-yard line and the Wolfpack recovered. NC State equalized once more with a Russell Wilson pass, which brought the score to 24–24.

With 4:50 remaining on the clock, and the ball on their own eight-yard line, Maryland drove 89 yards to the Wolfpack three-yard line, which included a pass to Davin Meggett for 31 yards. This set up a 20-yard field goal attempt by Obi Egekeze with eight seconds on the clock. The kick was good and put Maryland ahead for good, 27–24.

The Wolfpack lost its fourth straight game to remain the only ACC team winless in conference play (ACC: 0–4). The favorite Terrapins once again struggled against an underdog opponent, but managed to edge the Wolfpack and secure a sixth win for bowl eligibility. With it, Maryland was ranked for the first time since 2006, at 25th on the Associated Press and USA Today Coaches' Poll rankings. The fan poll ESPNU Allstate Standings had the Terrapins ranked 14th in the nation, ahead of AP first-ranked Texas and fourth-ranked Oklahoma.

Maryland had a bye in Week 10, while ACC Atlantic rival 16th-ranked Florida State lost to Georgia Tech. This allowed Maryland to take the uncontested lead in the Atlantic Division and rise in the AP Poll to number-23 and USA Today Coaches' Poll to number-21. Florida State fell to 24th, while once 19th-ranked Tulsa, 20th-ranked Minnesota, 23rd-ranked Oregon, and 24th-ranked South Florida were all dropped from the rankings after their own loses.

=== Virginia Tech ===
	1	2	3	4	Total
#23 Maryland	0	3	10	0	13
Virginia Tech	7	10	3	3	23

- Opponent pre-game record: 5–3
- Opponent final record: 10–4
- Pre-game line: Maryland +3.5

The two teams met for a Thursday night game at Blacksburg, a time and site where the Hokies have traditionally excelled. In the first quarter, Maryland drove 56 yards, but was held to a 46-yard field goal attempt, which was missed by Obi Egekeze. In the next series, Tech quarterback Sean Glennon led the Hokies on an 80-yard drive that culminated in a short pass to Greg Boone for a score. The next series went into the second quarter, and Maryland was again forced to attempt a field goal, which was made good. Hokies tailback Darren Evans then broke away for a 50-yard carry to the Maryland 30-yard line, and later capped it with a one-yard rush into the endzone. Before the half, Tech managed a field goal to expand their lead, 17–3.

In the second half, Chris Turner hit Darrius Heyward-Bey for a short bubble screen pass behind the line of scrimmage, and Heyward-Bey ran it 63 yards for the score. During the next series, the Terrapins were held three-and-out, but the punt was fumbled and recovered by Maryland on the Hokies 11-yard line. However, the Terrapins were again forced to settle for a field goal, which made it a one-possession lead for VT at 20–13 with 2:29 left in the third quarter. In the final quarter, the Hokies managed another field goal and held onto the lead for a final result of 23–13.

Hokies tailback Darren Evans ran for a school-record of 253 yards, and exceeded 100 rushing yards in a game for the first time in his career. The Hokie defense shut down the Terrapins running game and held them to −12 yards on 18 carries. Maryland also proved unable or unwilling to blitz against Sean Glennon, the Tech quarterback hobbled by an ankle injury. Glennon threw for 127 yards and a touchdown.

=== North Carolina (#16) ===
	1	2	3	4	Total
#16 North Carolina	12	3	0	0	15
Maryland	7	7	0	3	17

- Opponent pre-game record: 7–2
- Opponent final record: 8–5
- Pre-game line: Maryland +3

In another driving rainstorm at College Park, Maryland met 16th-ranked North Carolina. Maryland's first possession ended as a "three-and-out" series, and the Terrapins elected to punt. The ball was snapped high and sailed over punter Travis Baltz's head. Baltz recovered it in the Maryland end zone for a safety, which averted a possible North Carolina touchdown. Maryland kicked off to North Carolina, and held the Tar Heels to a field goal. On the subsequent possession, Maryland took the lead, 7–5, after a 76-yard drive that culminated with a short run by Da'Rel Scott. On North Carolina's next possession, quarterback Cameron Sexton threw a long pass, which was tipped by Maryland safety Kenny Tate, but deflected into the hands of receiver Cooter Arnold hands, who ran it into the end zone for a 59-yard touchdown. Davin Meggett powered 57 yards through the opposing defensive line on nine carries for another touchdown, which put Maryland back in the lead. Shortly before halftime, North Carolina kicked another field goal for the game's fifth lead change. The rain and wind let up in the third quarter, but the waterlogged playing field still presented challenging conditions. North Carolina placekicker Casey Barth struck the left upright on an unsuccessful 28-yard field goal attempt, but the Tar Heels soon recovered a fumble from Maryland back-up quarterback Josh Portis. North Carolina failed to capitalize, however, and punted the ball away. Chris Turner engineered a 73-yard drive in 19 plays, which included a scramble for a first down by the typically immobile pocket quarterback. That run put Maryland within field goal range, and Egekeze made the 26-yard attempt with 1:42 remaining to play. North Carolina received the kick and managed a first down, but Sexton then threw a 34-yard interception to safety Jamari McCollough. The Terrapins were then able to run out the play clock to win, 17–15.

The victory was Maryland's sixth consecutive against ranked opponents, which set a school record. At the time, Maryland was the only team in the nation with four wins over ranked opponents during the 2008 season. Only BCS National Championship Game participants Florida and Oklahoma later finished with more wins against ranked teams. Maryland also improved their home record to 6–0 for the season. Head coach Ralph Friedgen improved his record against North Carolina to 5–1, and kept North Carolina winless in College Park since 1997.

==== ACC Atlantic Division championship race ====
The results of that weekend's games improved the clarity of the ACC Championship Game picture, but did not decide it. Maryland improved their ACC record to 4–2 and took the uncontested lead of the Atlantic Division. Florida State lost to Boston College that same day, which meant four teams were still able to secure the division title: Boston College, Florida State, Maryland, and Wake Forest.

Boston College (ACC: 3–3) could travel to the ACC Championship Game if they won out by beating both Wake Forest and Maryland. Boston College eventually did just that, and lost to Virginia Tech in the 2008 ACC Championship Game. Florida State (ACC: 4–3) would have won the Atlantic Division if they beat Maryland, Maryland beat Boston College, and Boston College beat Wake Forest. Under those circumstances, Florida State would have finished with a 5–3 record, tied with Maryland, but win the tiebreaker because they had defeated Maryland head-to-head. However, Maryland lost to Boston College, which relegated Florida State to a second-place finish in the division. Wake Forest (ACC: 4–3) would have won the division if they won their last game against Boston College, and both Florida State and Boston College beat Maryland. In that case, Florida State and Wake Forest would have had identical conference records (ACC: 5–3), and Wake Forest would have won the tiebreaker because they defeated Florida State earlier in the season.

Maryland (ACC: 4–2) would have won the division title if they had either: (1) beaten both Florida State and Boston College; (2) beaten Florida State, while Boston College lost to Wake Forest; or (3) beaten Boston College, while Boston College lost to Wake Forest. That last scenario would have caused a three-way tie between Maryland, Florida State, and Wake Forest. All would have possessed a 5–3 conference record, and no head-to-head tiebreaker would have been possible. In that case, the winner would have been decided by divisional record, of which the Terrapins would have had the best (ACC Atlantic: 4–1).

=== Florida State ===
	1	2	3	4	Total
Florida State	0	21	3	13	37
#22 Maryland	0	0	3	0	3

- Opponent pre-game record: 7–3
- Opponent final record: 9–4
- Pre-game line: Maryland +1.5

After Wake Forest lost to Boston College earlier in the day, Florida State required a win over Maryland to proceed to the ACC Championship Game. The Seminoles also needed Maryland to win against Boston College the following week. As a testament to the must-win nature of the game for Florida State, it was designated as a "Sod Game", where, if won, the team would bring home a piece of Byrd Stadium's sod to be commemorated in their "Sod Cemetery".

Maryland received the opening kickoff and pushed into Florida State territory. On third down, Chris Turner was sacked and Maryland was forced to punt. Florida State was held three-and-out and punted. The Terrapins again pushed down field, before, on fourth and four on the Florida State 27-yard line, elected to attempt a field goal. Obi Egekeze's 44-yard attempt went wide of the uprights far to the right.

Florida State started a drive in the first quarter for 73 yards which culminated with a seven-yard Christian Ponder pass to Preston Parker for the score. The two teams traded punts, and Terrapins running back Da'Rel Scott fumbled the ball on the Maryland 26-yard line. Seminole linebacker Derek Nicholson picked up the ball and ran it into the endzone to bring the score to 14–0. On the next possession, Chris Turner threw his first interception in five games. Florida State then went three-and-out and punted. Maryland drove for 53 yards before another Turner pass was intercepted by Toddrick Verdell, who returned it for 34 yards. Florida State quarterback Ponder completed a 17-yard pass to Parker, and then ran it himself for 16 yards to the Maryland five-yard line. Two Antone Smith rushes brought the score to 21–0 at the half.

At the beginning of the second half, the Terrapins kicked off to the Seminoles before both teams traded field goals. Those were the only points for Maryland all night. In the fourth quarter, Florida State added another field goal. On the next possession, Maryland running back Da'Rel Scott and receiver Darrius Heyward-Bey both made short runs for a first down. Scott lost his second fumble of the night on the Terrapin 43-yard line. Florida State took over and scored another touchdown. After Maryland went three-and-out, Seminoles kicker Graham Gano made his third field goal of the night.

The Seminoles defense accumulated six sacks, two interceptions, and two forced fumbles. The loss ended Maryland's aspirations for the Atlantic Division title and, with it, a shot at the ACC Championship. Florida State remained in the running until Maryland lost to Boston College the following week.

Three hours before kick-off, Florida State safety Myron Rolle successfully interviewed for a Rhodes Scholarship in Birmingham, Alabama. Rolle then took a private flight to arrive at the game in time to play late in the first half.

=== Boston College (#20) ===
	1	2	3	4	Total
Maryland	7	0	0	14	21
#20 Boston College	7	7	7	7	28

- Opponent pre-game record: 8–3
- Opponent final record: 9–5
- Pre-game line: Maryland +6.5

Maryland entered the game having been knocked out of the running for the Atlantic Division title the previous week, but able to play spoiler for Boston College. The Eagles were playing to earn a berth to the ACC Championship Game for the second consecutive year. Additionally, competing within a closely contested ACC, Maryland could have greatly improved its standing for bowl selection with an eighth win. The Eagles were the fifth ranked team to face Maryland. The Terrapins were, to that point, 4–0 against top-25 opposition and the only team to beat four ranked opponents in 2008. Boston College was fielding second-string quarterback Dominique Davis in his first career appearance. He replaced starter Chris Crane, who had suffered a broken collarbone the previous week.

Boston College kicked off, and Torrey Smith made a 27-yard return to the Maryland 31-yard line. After a Terrapins false start and Eagles offsides penalty, Chris Turner connected with Torrey Smith for 12 yards and a first down. Turner gained another first down with a completion to Danny Oquendo to put them into BC territory. A rush for no gain and two incomplete passes forced a punt. Boston College responded with a 14-play, 88-yard drive that resulted in a seven-yard touchdown pass to Justin Jarvis. On the next possession, Turner completed passes to Emani Lee-Odai and Torrey Smith for 16- and 43-yard gains, respectively, and placed them at the Boston College one-yard line. Turner capped the drive with a one-yard rush for a score to tie the score, 7–7. To end the first quarter, Boston College linebacker Mike McLaughlin literally hurdled over 5-ft 8-in Davin Meggett to sack Turner in what was ranked an ESPN SportsCenter "Play of the Day". The Eagles and Terrapins traded punts twice, and then Boston College turned over on downs before Maryland was forced to punt again. After a Boston College punt, Chris Turner threw an interception to Mark Herzlich. On the next play Dominique Davis threw to Rich Gunnell for a 45-yard touchdown reception.

The second half started off with traded punts. Boston College took over with excellent field position on the Maryland 34-yard line, but was held to fourth and eight yards on the Terrapins' nine-yard line. The Eagles faked a field goal attempt, and holder Billy Flutie, nephew of Heisman winner Doug Flutie, rolled right and passed to Jordon McMichael for a nine-yard touchdown. The teams traded punts again, before Turner led the Terrapins on a 70-yard drive into the final quarter. A 13-yard reception by Danny Oquendo brought the score to 21–14. Boston College was then held three-and-out and punted. The Terrapins drove to the Eagles' 19-yard line, but Obi Egekeze missed the 36-yard field goal attempt. Boston College's next drive consisted of ten rush attempts by Montel Harris and burned three minutes off the clock. The Eagles punted and Turner completed three passes to advance to their own 35-yard line. Linebacker Robert Francois intercepted a pass and ran it 36 yards into the endzone. Steve Aponavicius's extra point brought it to 28–14. With 1:42 left, Turner completed eight passes including an 8-yard touchdown toss to Torrey Smith. With 0:14 remaining in the game, Maryland attempted an onside kick, but it bounced out of bounds. Boston College took possession and ran out the clock to end the game, 28–21.

Boston College ended Maryland's six-game winning streak against ranked opponents. With a 7–5 record, the Terrapins' postseason bowl game options were also limited. The Eagles secured the ACC Atlantic Division title and, with it, a trip to Tampa for the ACC Championship Game to face Virginia Tech for the second-straight season. Boston College held the Maryland run to −6 yards, forcing reliance on Chris Turner's passing ability. It was the second game of the season the Terrapins were held to negative rushing yards (this had also occurred against Virginia Tech). Turner, however, was able to throw for 360 yards, bettering Boston College's total offensive yardage of 318 yards.

=== Bowl selection process ===
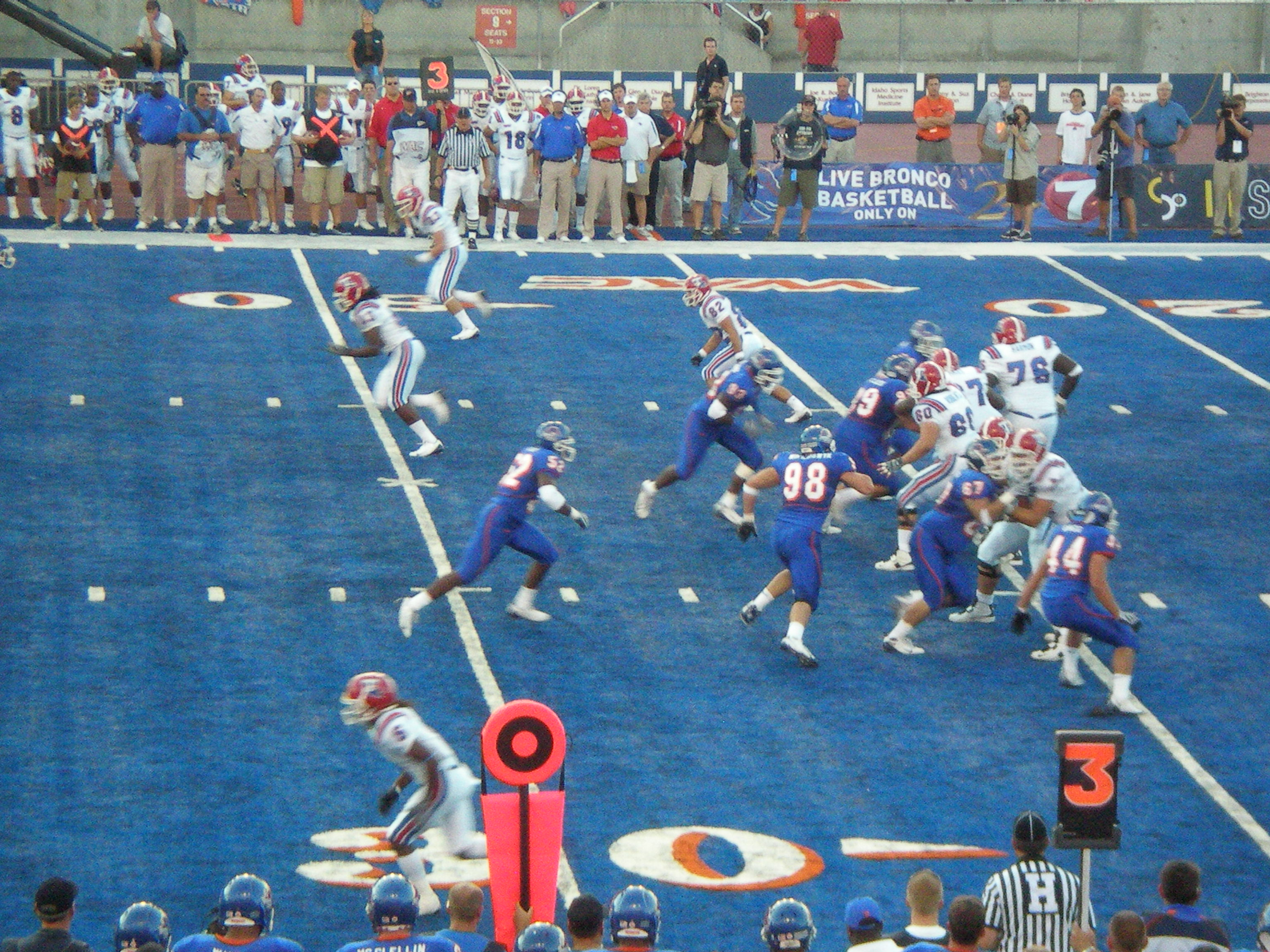
In the postseason, Maryland traveled to Boise to play on the blue turf of Bronco Stadium (pictured).

Maryland achieved bowl eligibility through its sixth win against NC State. The Terrapins finished the regular season with a 7–5 overall record and 4–4 record against ACC opponents. Maryland's conference record was identical to four other ACC teams, and the league fielded an NCAA record of ten bowl-eligible teams. For the 2008 season, there were eight non-Bowl Championship Series (BCS) bowl games with ACC tie-ins: the Gator Bowl, the Chick-fil-A Bowl, the Champs Sports Bowl, the Music City Bowl, the Humanitarian Bowl, the Emerald Bowl, the Meineke Car Care Bowl, and the EagleBank Bowl.

After Maryland suffered a fifth loss in the season closer against Boston College, it was very unlikely that the team's preferred postseason game, the Meineke Car Care Bowl, was going to extend an invitation. The game's selection committee in Charlotte, North Carolina was eager to secure nearby North Carolina (8–4). Meanwhile, the EagleBank Bowl, hosted by RFK Stadium in Washington, D.C., not far from the Maryland campus, secured in-state rival Navy, but the game date conflicted with Maryland's final exams. Soon after Maryland's regular season finale, sportswriters and analysts speculated that the Humanitarian Bowl in Boise, Idaho, was the most likely postseason destination. Bowl officials there worked to secure a game of undefeated teams between the hometown team, Boise State, and Ball State of the Mid-American Conference. However, Ball State rejected the proposal to play at Boise State's homefield as unacceptable.

On December 7, 2008, Maryland accepted a bid to play in the Roady's Humanitarian Bowl against Nevada. The Western Athletic Conference (WAC) team likewise finished with a 7–5 record. Nevada was ranked the number-five total offense and number-two rushing offense in the nation with 510.6 total yards per game. In 2008, running back Vai Taua ran for 1,420 and quarterback Colin Kaepernick for 1,115 yards, and the latter threw for an additional 2,479 yards. The Humanitarian Bowl executive director, Kevin McDonald, said, "We look forward to welcoming a Maryland [team] that defeated four Top 25 opponents and spent three weeks ranked ... Nevada comes in having played two teams, Texas Tech and Missouri, that were then ranked nationally in the top ten. They also gave ninth-ranked Boise State their toughest [WAC] game."

=== Nevada (2008 Humanitarian Bowl) ===
	1	2	3	4	Total
Maryland	13	15	0	14	42
Nevada	14	0	7	14	35

- Opponent pre-game record: 7–5
- Opponent final record: 7–6
- Pre-game line: Maryland +1.5

Prior to the game, Maryland head coach Ralph Friedgen placed a partial-game suspension on seven players who violated the team's pre-bowl curfew, including leading rusher, Da'Rel Scott, and senior wide receiver Danny Oquendo. Consequently, a much younger line-up started for Maryland, including, according to Friedgen, some who probably would not have seen playing time otherwise.

The game started with Maryland receiving the kick-off and on the first series, quarterback Chris Turner linked up with freshman Adrian Cannon for a 59-yard touchdown. However, placekicker Obi Egekeze missed the extra point. Nevada quarterback and Western Athletic Conference offensive player of the year, Colin Kaepernick, responded with a drive which included a 68-yard pass to the Maryland 3-yard line. The Terrapin defense stopped two rushing attempts by Vai Taua, but a short pass was good for the score, and with the extra point, Nevada took the lead 6–7. The Wolf Pack then kicked a 69-yard kick-off to Torrey Smith, who returned it 99 yards for a second Maryland touchdown. Egekeze made good the extra point and Maryland regained the lead, 13–7. On the next kick-off, Egekeze attempted to kick the ball as it fell off the tee, resulting in a short squib, which was returned to the Terrapins' 9-yard line. Kaepernick threw into the endzone where it was intercepted by Maryland safety Kenny Tate for a touchback, but the Terrapins were soon forced to punt. Kaepernick advanced the ball downfield before a Taua 17-yard touchdown run. In the next series, Maryland sophomore Morgan Green rushed for three yards and then a 53-yard touchdown breakaway. Later, Turner converted on third down with a 16-yard toss to Ronnie Tyler and threw again to Tyler for a 14-yard touchdown. Turner tallied a two-point conversion with a throw to Davin Meggett, and Maryland led at halftime 28–14.

Wolf Pack running back Taua was able to capitalize after a Turner-thrown pick and narrow their deficit, 28–21. A sack against Turner knocked the ball loose, was recovered by Nevada, fumbled again, and finally recovered by the Terrapins' Scott Burley. Turner then connected with Darrius Heyward-Bey for an 11-yard first down and a fresh Da'Rel Scott made his first touch of the game for another first down on the Nevada 23. Turner was again sacked and fumbled, and Nevada recovered. Kaepernick then completed 38-yard and 21-yard passes to even the score, 28–28. Turner converted on third down with a 26-yard toss to Torrey Smith. Scott was soon able to break open down the middle for a 49-yard touchdown run. On the next Maryland series, Da'Rel Scott was handed the ball four times in succession and scored his second touchdown. With 4:01 remaining, Kaepernick led a drive starting from the Nevada 23, before a scramble for a touchdown made it a one-possession game with 2:19 remaining. Jaekle attempted an on-side kick, but it was recovered by Maryland. Scott picking up a first down and clinched a 42–35 Maryland victory.

Maryland freshman wide receiver Torrey Smith, with his 99-yard kickoff return touchdown, broke the all-time ACC record for single-season kickoff returns with 1,089 yards. Maryland running back Da'Rel Scott rushed for 174 yards, earning Most Valuable Player honors alongside Nevada quarterback Colin Kaepernick who threw for 370 yards. Scott set the University of Maryland's record for rushing yards in a bowl game, in what was just one-and-half quarters of playing time due to his curfew suspension. He also broke the 1,000-yard per season barrier, making him one of just seven players in school history to do so. Four Maryland back-ups who saw significant play due to the curfew suspensions also scored touchdowns: second-string X-receiver Torrey Smith, second-string slot receiver Ronnie Tyler, third-string slot receiver Adrian Cannon, and third-string running back Morgan Green.

== Rankings ==
In Week 9, after defeating Wake Forest to improve to a 6–1 record, Maryland was ranked 25th by both the Associated Press and the Coaches' Polls. It was the first time the team was ranked since Week 11 in 2006. Maryland rose in the polls, and entered the Harris and BCS rankings after beating NC State the following week. However, after the loss to Virginia Tech, the Terps fell out of the rankings altogether. Maryland made one final poll appearance after the win over North Carolina, before losing to Florida State.

Ranking movements Legend: ██ Increase in ranking ██ Decrease in ranking — = Not ranked
	Week															
Poll	Pre	1	2	3	4	5	6	7	8	9	10	11	12	13	14	Final
AP	—	—	—	—	—	—	—	—	—	25	23	—	22	—	—	—
Coaches	—	—	—	—	—	—	—	—	—	25	21	—	23	—	—	—
Harris	Not released					—	—	—	—	—	23	—	23	—	—	Not released
BCS	Not released								—	—	23	—	25	—	—	Not released

== Postseason ==
=== Coaching changes ===
At the end of the regular season, but before the postseason bowl game, Maryland lost two members of its coaching staff. On December 5, 2008, the school announced that defensive coordinator Chris Cosh would return to Kansas State to take over as assistant coach and co-defensive coordinator. He joined the staff of the recently re-hired Bill Snyder, who was Kansas State's head coach from 1996 to 2005. Cosh previously served under Snyder as his linebackers coach from 2004 to 2005. For the bowl game, Maryland appointed outside linebackers coach Al Seamonson as the interim defensive coordinator. Maryland also lost its special teams and tight ends coach, Danny Pearman, who was hired by new Clemson head coach Dabo Swinney. Pearman was a Clemson alumnus and played there as a tight end from 1984 to 1987. At Alabama, he coached special teams and the offensive and defensive tackles from 1990 to 1997, during which time Swinney played there as a wide receiver. For Maryland's bowl game, third-year intern Brian White acted as interim tight ends coach, and he assisted head coach Ralph Friedgen in directing the special teams.

After the bowl game, in February 2009, the athletic department named offensive coordinator James Franklin the "head coach-in-waiting", meaning that he would be the eventual successor to Ralph Friedgen. Upon the expiration of Friedgen's contract in January 2012, Franklin will be offered the position or paid a US$1 million contractual buyout. In June 2009, Friedgen said he might like to stay an additional two years past his current contract, but athletic director Deborah Yow responded that the school could not afford the buyout. She said that any extension would have to be worked out between Friedgen and Franklin.

=== All-star games ===
Five Maryland players were selected by postseason all-star games. Defensive lineman Jeremy Navarre appeared in the Texas vs. The Nation Game. Offensive linemen Edwin Williams and Jaimie Thomas participated in the East–West Shrine Game. Linebacker Moise Fokou played in the Under Armour Senior Bowl. Kevin Barnes was also selected to participate in the Senior Bowl very early in the season before he suffered a scapular fracture. He attended the game, but did not play due to his injury.

=== NFL draft ===
Five former Maryland players were selected in the 2009 NFL draft, which tied North Carolina for the most of any Atlantic Coast Conference team. Wide receiver Darrius Heyward-Bey, who ran the fastest 40-yard dash time at the combine of 4.30 seconds, was selected by the Oakland Raiders as the seventh overall pick, far higher than most analysts had anticipated. Cornerback Kevin Barnes, who had scored the highest grade on the intelligence test at the combine, was selected in the third round by the Washington Redskins. Linebacker Moise Fokou, guard Jaimie Thomas, and tight end Dan Gronkowski were all selected in the seventh round.

Additionally, several former Terrapins were signed by NFL teams as free agents shortly after the draft. These consisted of: linebacker Dave Philistin, center Edwin Williams, wide receiver Isaiah Williams, defensive end Jeremy Navarre, offensive tackle Scott Burley, linebacker Chase Bullock, offensive tackle Dane Randolph, and defensive lineman Dean Muhtadi.

== Awards ==
=== All-conference honors ===
All-ACC honorees were selected by a 67-member committee from the Atlantic Coast Conference Sports Media Association (ACSMA). Maryland tied with Atlantic Division Co-Champion Boston College for most All-ACC honorees at nine. Virginia Tech and Georgia Tech each secured eight All-ACC honors. Three Maryland players were selected to the first team: punter Travis Baltz, running back Da'Rel Scott, and center Edwin Williams. Linebacker Alex Wujciak was named to the second team. Offensive linemen Scott Burley and Jaimie Thomas, tight end Dan Gronkowski, wide receiver Darrius Heyward-Bey, and defensive lineman Jeremy Navarre were named as honorable mention All-ACC players.

=== Players of the Week ===
- Travis Baltz (P): ACC Football Player of the Week for special teams, September 29, 2008
- Bruce Campbell (OL): ACC Football Player of the Week for offensive lineman, October 20, 2008
- Chris Turner (QB): ACC Football Player of the Week for offensive back, October 20, 2008
- Edwin Williams (C): ACC Football Player of the Week for offensive lineman, November 17, 2008

=== Other awards ===
- Obi Egekeze (K): Lou Groza Star of the Week (awarded for top-three placekicks), October 18, 2008
- Chris Turner (QB): ESPN/Pontiac Game Changing Performance nomination, November 15, 2008

=== Watch lists ===
- Dan Gronkowski (TE): 2008 Draddy Trophy semifinalist
- Dan Gronkowski (TE): 2008 John Mackey Award watch list
- Dave Philistin (LB): 2008 Bronko Nagurski Trophy watch list
- Dave Philistin (LB): 2008 Rotary Lombardi Award watch list
- Da'Rel Scott (RB): 2008 Maxwell Award watch list
- Edwin Williams (OL): 2008 Rimington Trophy watch list
- Edwin Williams (OL): 2008 Rotary Lombardi Award watch list

== Statistics ==
=== Team statistics ===
	Total	Average
Scoring offense (opponents)	283 (272)	21.8 (20.9)
Touchdowns	34	2.6
Total offensive yards	4,415	339.6
Passing yards	2,687	206.7
Rushing yards	1,728	132.9
First downs	234	18.0
Third down conversions (no./attempts)	69 / 165	5.3 / 12.7
Fourth down conversions (no./attempts)	8 / 15	0.6 / 1.2
Penalties (no.–yards)	61 – 536	4.7 – 41.2
Time of possession	–	27:47

=== Offense ===
==== Passing ====
Player	GP	GS	Rating	Cmp.	Att.	Cmp. %	Yards	TD	Int.	Long
Chris Turner	13	12	119.3	214	374	57.2	2,516	13	11	80
Jordan Steffy	1	1	87.0	10	18	55.6	115	0	2	36
Danny Oquendo (WR)	13	5	395.6	1	2	50.0	43	1	0	43
Da'Rel Scott (RB)	12	11	252.8	1	2	50.0	9	1	0	9
Josh Portis	8	0	44.5	1	3	33.3	4	0	0	4

==== Rushing ====
Player	GP	GS	Car.	Yards	Y/G	Y/C	Long	TD
Da'Rel Scott	12	11	209	1,133	94.4	5.4	63	8
Davin Meggett	13	2	89	457	35.2	5.1	38	4
Darrius Heyward-Bey (WR)	12	12	15	202	16.8	13.5	76	1
Josh Portis (QB)	8	0	31	186	23.2	6.0	33	1
Morgan Green	10	0	24	112	11.2	4.7	53	3
Danny Oquendo (WR)	13	5	2	4	0.3	2.0	3	0
Cory Jackson	13	6	3	4	0.3	1.3	4	0
Emani Lee-Odai (WR)	13	1	1	1	0.1	1.0	3	0
Austin Walker	11	0	1	1	0.1	1.0	1	0
Torrey Smith (WR)	13	6	1	0	0.0	0.0	0	0
Jordan Steffy (QB)	1	1	3	-5	-5.0	-1.7	3	0
Chris Turner (QB)	13	12	43	-154	-11.8	-3.6	13	1

==== Receiving ====
Player	GP	GS	Rec.	Yards	Y/G	Avg.	Long	TD
Darrius Heyward-Bey	12	12	42	609	50.8	14.5	80	5
Danny Oquendo	13	5	29	371	28.5	12.8	50	2
Torrey Smith	13	6	24	336	25.8	14.0	44	2
Dan Gronkowski	13	12	29	287	22.1	9.9	25	3
Ronnie Tyler	13	1	20	225		11.3	20	1
Da'Rel Scott	12	11	21	171		8.1	25	0
Isaiah Williams	13	6	10	124		12.4	43	1
Emani Lee-Odai	13	1	12	115		9.6	23	0
Lansford Watson	13	1	10	115		11.5	32	0
Cory Jackson	13	6	12	106		8.8	29	0
Davin Meggett	13	2	9	79		8.8	31	0
Adrian Cannon	13	1	3	75		25.0	59	1
Haroon Brown	12	0	1	20		20.0	20	0
Laquan Williams	3	0	2	19		9.5	11	0
Tommy Galt	13	0	1	18		18.0	18	0
Taylor Watson	5	1	1	11		11.0	11	0
Morgan Green	10	0	1	6		6.0	6	0

==== Kicking ====
Player	XPs	XP Att.	XP %	FGs	FG Att.	FG %	Long	Pts
Obi Egekeze	32	33	97.0	15	24	62.5	47	77

=== Defense ===
Name	GP	GS	Tackles				Sacks	Pass defense				Fumbles		Blocked Kick
Name	GP	GS	Solo	Ast	Total	TFL–Yds	#–Yds	Int–Yds	BrUp	PD	QBH	Rcv–Yds	FF	Blocked Kick
Alex Wujciak	13	13	56	77	133	8.5–26	1.5–9	0–0	2	2	0	1–0	0	1
Dave Philistin	13	12	41	53	94	5.0–15	2.0–9	0–0	0	0	0	0	0	0
Moise Fokou	13	12	41	36	77	12.0–49	5.0–29	0–0	2	2	1	0	0	0
Jeremy Navarre	13	13	32	38	70	7.5–22	2.5–13	0–0	3	3	0	0	1	0
Jeff Allen	13	13	34	32	66	2.0–3	0–0	1–0	3	4	0	0	0	0
Terrell Skinner	11	11	32	31	63	3.0–6	0–0	1–6	3	4	0	0	1	0
Anthony Wiseman	13	13	32	17	49	1.0–2	0–0	0–0	10	10	0	0	0	0
Trey Covington	12	9	22	16	38	3.0–8	2.5–8	0–0	1	1	0	0	0	0
Nolan Carroll	10	4	20	17	37	1.0–3	0–0	0–0	8	8	0	0	0	0
Jamari McCollough	13	2	29	8	37	1.0–8	1.0–8	4–10	2	6	0	1–0	0	0
Chase Bullock	13	1	15	20	35	1.0–1	0–0	0–0	3	3	0	0–0	0	0
Travis Ivey	9	4	13	13	26	4.0–12	1.0–4	0–0	0	0	0	0–0	1	0
Total	—	—	497	466	963	71–254	28–148	10–43	49	59	2	7–0	9	4

=== Special teams ===
Name	Punting								Kickoffs				
Name	No.	Yds	Avg	Long	TB	FC	I20	Blkd	No.	Yds	Avg	TB	OB
Travis Baltz	61	2,506	41.1	59	7	18	24	0	5	243	48.6	1	2
Obi Egekeze	0	–	–	–	–	–	–	–	57	3,603	63.2	8	0
Total	61	2,506	41.1	59	7	18	24	0	62	3,846	62.0	9	2

Name	Punt returns					Kick returns				
Name	No.	Yds	Avg	TD	Long	No.	Yds	Avg	TD	Long
Torrey Smith	0	—	—	—	—	42	1,089	25.9	1	99
Kenny Tate	0	—	—	—	—	6	84	14.0	0	17
Dan Gronkowski	0	—	—	—	—	2	12	6.0	0	8
Terrell Skinner	0	—	—	—	—	1	15	15.0	0	15
Danny Oquendo	20	104	5.2	0	15	1	1	1.0	0	1
Cory Jackson	0	—	—	—	—	1	9	9.0	0	9
Morgan Green	0	—	—	—	—	1	2	2.0	0	2
Tony Logan	6	49	8.2	0	15	0	—	—	—	–
Adrian Moten	1	21	21.0	0	0	0	—	—	—	–
Dominique Herald	1	15	15.0	0	15	0	—	—	—	–
Total	28	189	6.8	0	45	54	1,212	22.4	1	99
