= Scott Burley =

American football player (born 1986)

Baltimore Mariners
- Position: Offensive tackle

Personal information
- Born: January 2, 1986 (age 40); Baltimore, Maryland
- Listed height: 6 ft 5 in (1.96 m)
- Listed weight: 335 lb (152 kg)

Career information
- College: Maryland
- NFL draft: 2009: undrafted

Career history
- Washington Redskins (2009)*; Baltimore Mariners (2009–present)
- * Offseason or practice squad member only

Awards and highlights
- 2007 Rivals.com second-team All-ACC

Scott Burley (born January 2, 1986) is an American football offensive lineman. He played college football for the Maryland Terrapins at the University of Maryland.

== Early life ==
Scott was born in Baltimore, Maryland to mother Sabrina Burley. He attended Woodlawn Senior High School where he was a four-year starter as an offensive tackle. He also played the position of defensive tackle as a junior and senior. As a junior, he allowed only one quarterback sack, and as a senior, he recorded 45 pancake blocks while allowing no sacks. That final season, he also recorded six sacks while playing on defense.

As a junior, Burley was named an Associated Press all-state, Baltimore Sun second-team All-Met, all-city, all-county, and all-division player. During his senior year, he was named a Maryland High School Football Coaches Association all-state, Baltimore Sun first-team All-Met, all-city, all-county, and al-division player. He was also a SuperPrep All-American and PrepStar "Dream Team" member. Rated the third-best overall player in the Mid-Atlantic region and one of the top 150 players in the nation, SuperPrep ranked him the 11th-best offensive tackle in the game. Burley was recruited by Florida, Maryland, Miami, Notre Dame, Penn State, and Virginia Tech. The Palm Beach Post named Burley the Terrapins' top recruit in the 2004 class.

== College career ==
Burley attended the University of Maryland, where he majored in criminology and criminal justice. He saw action in four games as a true freshman in 2004. In 2005, he missed the first three games due to a back injury, but saw action in the final eight games for a total of 44 plays, while committing one penalty and allowing one sack. In 2006, he played in the season-opener against William & Mary, before suffering a season-ending injury, for which he was awarded a medical redshirt.

In 2007, Burley played in all 13 games at left tackle including 12 starts. That season, he was part of the offensive line unit that helped tailbacks Lance Ball and Keon Lattimore run for a combined 1,600 yards and 25 touchdowns, and allowed quarterback Chris Turner to rank as the third-most efficient in the Atlantic Coast Conference (ACC). He received the team's James M. Tatum Award as its top offensive lineman. Rivals.com named Burley a second-team All-ACC player.

In 2008, he played in all 13 games, with six starts at left tackle and six at right tackle. Lindy's and Athlon had named him a preseason second-team All-ACC player and The New York Times included him among the "players to watch". Burley played on the offensive line that helped tailback Da'Rel Scott rush for 1,133 yards, and quarterback Chris Turner to throw for 2,516 yards. He was named an honorable mention All-ACC player.

== Professional career ==
Pre-draft measurables
Height	Weight	40-yard dash	10-yard split	20-yard split	20-yard shuttle	Three-cone drill	Vertical jump	Broad jump	Bench press
6 ft 4 3/4 in (1.95 m)	315 lb (143 kg)	5.45 s	1.85 s	3.03 s	4.67 s	7.73 s	31.0 in (0.79 m)	8 ft 0 in (2.44 m)	19 reps
All values from Pro Day

=== Washington Redskins ===
Burley was signed as an undrafted free agent by the Washington Redskins shortly after the 2009 NFL draft. However, he was cut at the end of the preseason. On October 19, he signed with his hometown Baltimore Mariners of the AIFA.
