= LaQuan Williams =

American gridiron football player (born 1988)

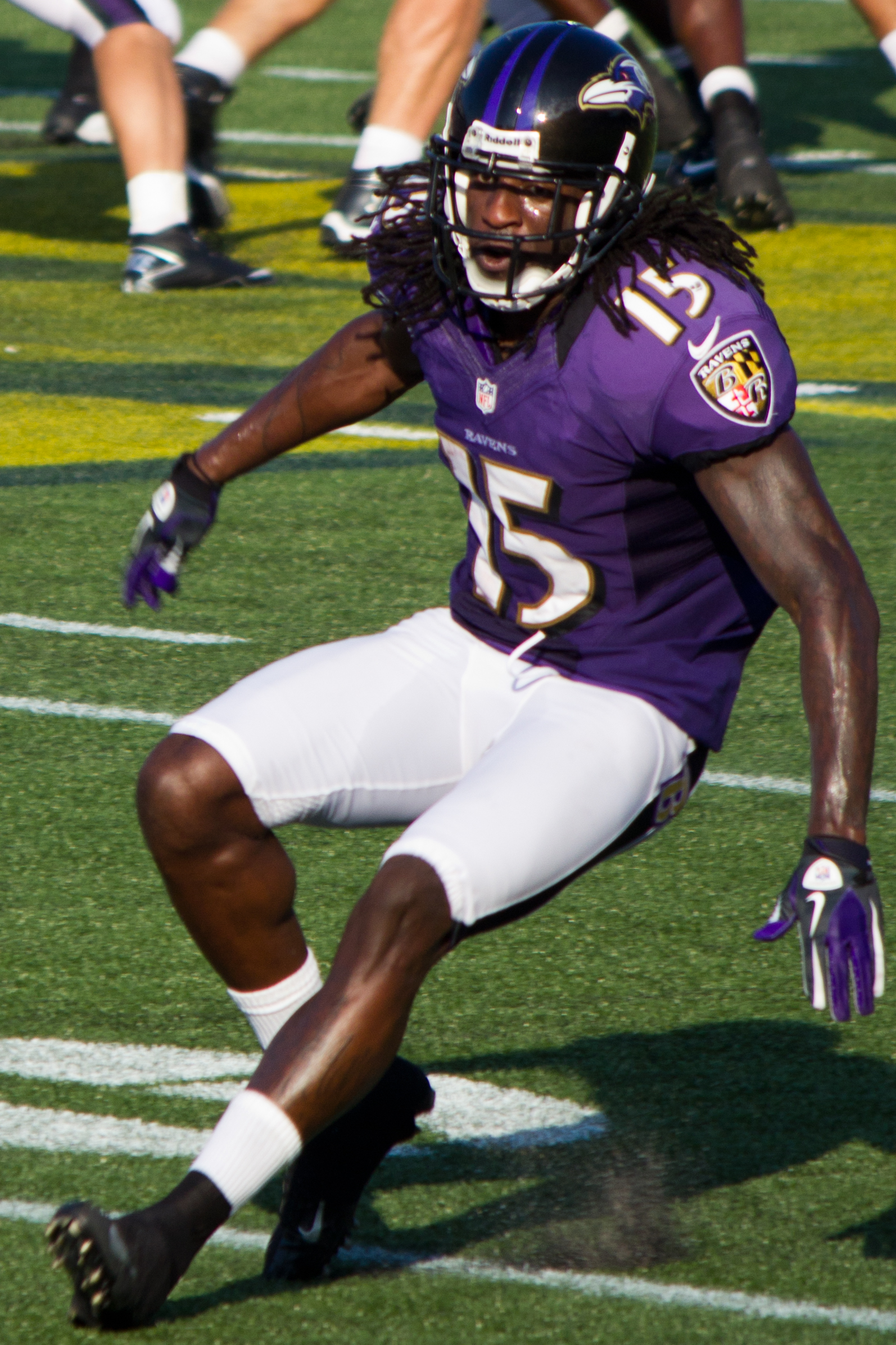
- Williams with the Ravens at Navy–Marine Corps Memorial Stadium in August 2012.

No. 15
- Position: Wide receiver

Personal information
- Born: June 27, 1988 (age 38); Baltimore, Maryland, U.S.
- Listed height: 6 ft 1 in (1.85 m)
- Listed weight: 210 lb (95 kg)

Career information
- High school: Baltimore Poly
- College: Maryland
- NFL draft: 2011: undrafted

Career history
- Baltimore Ravens (2011–2012); New England Patriots (2013); Baltimore Ravens (2014)*; Saskatchewan Roughriders (2015)*; Los Angeles KISS (2016); Baltimore Brigade (2017)
- * Offseason or practice squad member only

Awards and highlights
- Super Bowl champion (XLVII); 2007 The Sporting News ACC all-freshman team

Career NFL statistics
- Receptions: 4
- Receiving yards: 46
- Stats at Pro Football Reference

Career AFL statistics
- Receptions: 23
- Receiving yards: 188
- Receiving touchdowns: 7
- Stats at ArenaFan.com

LaQuan Williams (born June 27, 1988) is an American former professional football player who was a wide receiver in the National Football League (NFL). He played college football for the Maryland Terrapins and was signed by the Baltimore Ravens as an undrafted free agent in 2011. He has also played for the New England Patriots.

== Early life ==
Williams was born on June 27, 1988, in Baltimore, Maryland. He attended the Baltimore Polytechnic Institute where he played on the football team as a quarterback and safety and on the basketball team as a shooting guard. In football, Williams won three varsity letters and started for two seasons. He caught 10 interceptions each in both his junior and senior seasons. In his final year, he gained 804 rushing yards, six rushing touchdowns, 630 passing yards, seven passing touchdowns, and returned two punts and a kickoff for touchdowns. The Baltimore Sun named him a second-team All-City player as a junior and a first-team All-City defensive back as a senior. In basketball, Williams was a four-year letter winner and averaged over 20.0 points per game. Williams was recruited by Maryland, Virginia, Virginia Tech, and James Madison.

== College career ==
Williams attended the University of Maryland, College Park, where he majored in American studies. He sat out his freshman season as a redshirt. During the 2007 season, he split time at the Z-receiver position with Isaiah Williams. Against No. 10 Rutgers, backup quarterback Chris Turner connected with Williams on two passes for 66 yards. Williams caught a spectacular diving reception for 27 yards that set up a score by running back Keon Lattimore for a 34–24 victory. After the game against No. 8 Boston College, Williams suffered a season ending MCL sprain during practice. The Sporting News named him to its ACC All-Freshman Team.

During the 2008 season, Williams was limited to action in three games as a reserve because of a foot injury. He was declared academically ineligible in early February 2009, but regained eligibility in time for spring practice and the 2009 season. He played in all 12 games including one as a starter. Against Rutgers, Williams caught a 24-yard touchdown pass.

Before the 2010 season, Williams beat out teammate Ronnie Tyler for the starting slot receiver position. He saw action in all 13 games, including three starts. Williams had twelve tackles on special teams and at the end of the season earned the special teams captain award. Against Wake Forest, Williams blocked a punt.

== Professional career ==
Pre-draft measurables
Height	Weight	40-yard dash	10-yard split	20-yard split	20-yard shuttle	Three-cone drill	Vertical jump	Broad jump	Bench press
6 ft 0 3/4 in (1.85 m)	201 lb (91 kg)	4.55 s	1.63 s	2.57 s	4.36 s	7.28 s	34.0 in (0.86 m)	10 ft 4 in (3.15 m)	15 reps
All values from Pro Day

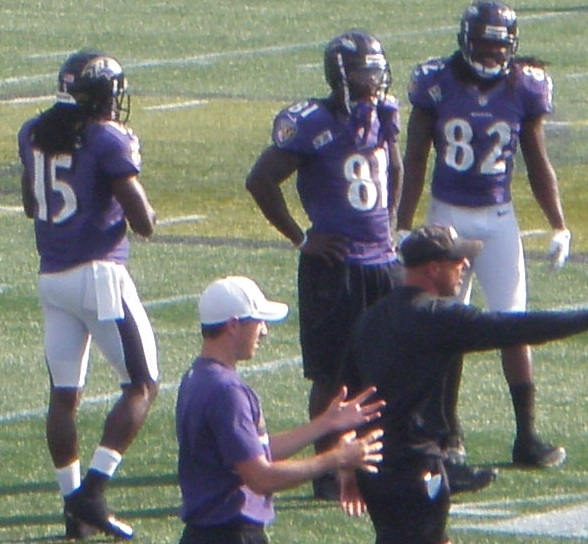
Williams (15) at Navy–Marine Corps Memorial Stadium in 2012. Also pictured are Anquan Boldin (81) and Torrey Smith (82).

=== Baltimore Ravens ===
The Baltimore Ravens signed Williams as an undrafted free agent in 2011. In his first preseason game against the Philadelphia Eagles, he made three catches for 46 yards and was the team's second leading receiver behind tight end Dennis Pitta. Because of injury to Lee Evans, Williams played several games of the 2011 season as the Ravens' third receiver, including the Sunday Night Football matchup which saw the team sweep their heated rival Pittsburgh Steelers, in which he notched two big receptions for first downs. Along with time at receiver, he was also a special teams standout, recording 4 tackles in his rookie season while also returning 5 kicks for 109 yards on a 21.8 yard average in 2011. He also finished with four special teams tackles.

During the team's Super Bowl run in 2012, Williams saw no touches on offense but collected five tackles on special teams. He was placed on injured reserve in December.

On September 1, 2013, the Ravens waived him.

=== New England Patriots ===
The New England Patriots signed Williams to a one-year contract on November 5, 2013. Ten days later, he was released by the New England Patriots on November 15, 2013.

=== Second and Third stints with Ravens ===
On April 24, 2014, Williams re-signed with the Baltimore Ravens. The Ravens released Williams on August 25, 2014.

On December 3, 2014, Williams was re-signed to the Ravens' practice squad. The Ravens released him just six days later.

=== 2015 NFL Veteran Combine ===
Williams participated in the first NFL Veteran Combine in 2015.

=== Saskatchewan Roughriders ===
On September 29, 2015, Williams was signed to the Saskatchewan Roughriders's practice squad. On June 19, 2016, Williams was cut by the Roughriders.

=== Los Angeles KISS ===
On July 14, 2016, Williams was assigned to the Los Angeles KISS.

=== Baltimore Brigade ===
Williams was assigned to the Baltimore Brigade on January 30, 2017.
