= Jaimie Thomas =

American football player (born 1986)

No. 73
- Position: Guard

Personal information
- Born: August 24, 1986 (age 40); Harrisburg, Pennsylvania, U.S.
- Listed height: 6 ft 4 in (1.93 m)
- Listed weight: 330 lb (150 kg)

Career information
- High school: Bishop McDevitt (Harrisburg)
- College: Maryland
- NFL draft: 2009: 7th round, 236th overall pick

Career history
- Indianapolis Colts (2009–2011); Los Angeles Kiss (2014)*; Harrisburg Stampede (2014)*
- * Offseason or practice squad member only

Career NFL statistics
- Games played: 8
- Total tackles: 1
- Stats at Pro Football Reference

Jaimie Franklin Thomas (born August 24, 1986) is an American former professional football player who was a guard in the National Football League (NFL). He was selected by the Indianapolis Colts in the seventh round of the 2009 NFL draft after playing college football for the Maryland Terrapins.

== Early life ==
Thomas was born on August 24, 1986, in Harrisburg, Pennsylvania, to Jerome and Charley Thomas. Two of his brothers, Jonathan and Joseph, also attended the University of Maryland. Jaimie Thomas attended Bishop McDevitt High School, where he played football and basketball, earning a letter in both three times. In football, he played as an offensive tackle and defensive tackle. As a sophomore, he allowed just one quarterback sack, while allowing none during his junior and senior seasons. He served as part of a blocking unit for the state of Pennsylvania's best rusher, LeSean McCoy, who, in 2003, rushed for 2,561 yards in ten games.

Thomas was named a SuperPrep All-American, PrepStar honorable mention, All-Northeast region, and first-team all-state player. He was named an all-conference player during both his senior and junior years. Rivals.com ranked him as a four-star recruit. He was recruited by Maryland, Notre Dame, Penn State, and Tennessee.

During his high school career, Thomas maintained a 3.7 grade-point average and was a member of the National Honor Society.

== College career ==
Thomas sat out the 2004 season as a redshirt at the University of Maryland, College Park. He served as a member of the scout team and was named the offensive scout team player of the week in the practices leading up to the game against Northern Illinois. In 2005, Thomas saw action in all 11 games, including one start at the left guard position, and recorded three "big" blocks while allowing one sack in 162 plays. Before the 2006 season, head coach Ralph Friedgen suspended Thomas and tackle Jared Gaither from summer practice for two weeks due to unspecified team rules violations. Friedgen said that they were not in any legal trouble, and they returned after serving the suspension.

In 2006, he played in all 13 games including three starts at left guard. Thomas was part of the offensive line responsible for opening lanes for tailbacks Lance Ball and Keon Lattimore, who rushed for over 1,400 combined yards. The unit allowed 19 sacks, the second-best tally in the Atlantic Coast Conference (ACC).

In 2007, Thomas played in eight games as a left guard, including seven starts, before he suffered a fractured right fibula against Virginia. The Washington Times correlated Maryland's defeat in that game to the loss of Thomas. Up to that point, Thomas had helped Ball and Lattimore again rush for almost 1,600 yards, and helped quarterback Chris Turner become the third-most efficient passer in the ACC.

In 2008, he played in all 13 games, including 12 starts. That season, the offensive line allowed Da'Rel Scott to rush for 1,133 yards and Turner to throw for 2,516 yards, the seventh-highest single-season passing mark in school history. Before the season, he had been named an Athlon and Lindy's preseason second-team All-ACC player. The Associated Press and Atlantic Coast Sports Media Association named him an All-ACC honorable mention.

== Professional career ==
Pre-draft measurables
| Height | Weight | Arm length | Hand span | 40-yard dash | 10-yard split | 20-yard split | 20-yard shuttle | Three-cone drill | Vertical jump | Broad jump | Bench press |
|---|---|---|---|---|---|---|---|---|---|---|---|
| 6 ft 4 in (1.93 m) | 323 lb (147 kg) | 35 in (0.89 m) | 9 1/2 in (0.24 m) | 5.42 s | 1.88 s | 3.11 s | 4.67 s | 7.99 s | 28.0 in (0.71 m) | 8 ft 0 in (2.44 m) | 26 reps |
All values from NFL Combine/Pro Day

=== Indianapolis Colts ===
Thomas was selected in the seventh round of the 2009 NFL draft by the Indianapolis Colts as the 236th overall pick. The NFL Draft Scout had ranked him as eighth out of 192 offensive guard prospects for the draft and had projected him as a fifth-round selection. Thomas participated in the NFL Combine, where he was X-rayed in order to assess the fracture he suffered in 2007. He said that he believed he passed all the medical exams. Scouts were reportedly impressed by his arm length, a 78-inch wingspan, which Thomas said "helps in pass-blocking more than run-blocking ... me being able to lock onto guys." He spent the entire 2009 season on the Colts' practice squad, and was re-signed to a future contract on February 11, 2010. He played in eight games for the Colts in 2010, but spent the entire 2011 season on injured reserve. He was waived from the team on February 7, 2012.

=== Los Angeles Kiss ===
On October 4, 2013, Thomas was assigned to the Los Angeles Kiss of the Arena Football League (AFL). He was reassigned on March 8, 2014.

=== Harrisburg Stampede ===
On March 15, 2014, Thomas signed with the Harrisburg Stampede of the Professional Indoor Football League (PIFL).
