= Isaiah Williams (wide receiver, born 1987) =

American gridiron football player (born 1987)

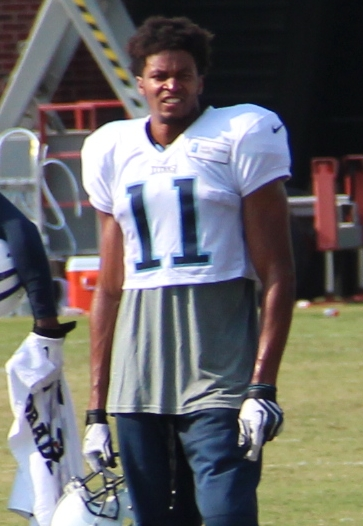

No. 84, 11
- Position: Wide receiver

Personal information
- Born: January 30, 1987 (age 39); Montclair, New Jersey, U.S.
- Listed height: 6 ft 2 in (1.88 m)
- Listed weight: 201 lb (91 kg)

Career information
- High school: Bergen Catholic (Oradell, New Jersey)
- College: Maryland
- NFL draft: 2009: undrafted

Career history
- Baltimore Ravens (2009)*; Pittsburgh Steelers (2010)*; Arizona Cardinals (2010−2011)*; Seattle Seahawks (2011)*; Arizona Cardinals (2012); Oakland Raiders (2013)*; Tennessee Titans (2014)*; Edmonton Eskimos (2014)
- * Offseason or practice squad member only
- Stats at Pro Football Reference
- Stats at CFL.ca (archive)

Isaiah Williams (born January 30, 1987) is an American former football player who was a wide receiver in the National Football League (NFL). He played college football at the University of Maryland. He was signed by Baltimore Ravens as an undrafted free agent in 2009.

Williams never played in an NFL regular season game. He spent the entirety of his six-season career in the NFL as a practice squad, offseason or backup player for seven different teams. In 2014, he played for the Edmonton Eskimos of the Canadian Football League (CFL).

== Early life ==
Williams was born on January 30, 1987, in Montclair, New Jersey, to parents Ira and Rita Williams. His father played football at Rutgers and his brother, Ira Jr., played at Wake Forest from 1998 to 2001. His twin sister, Tahirah, played basketball as a guard at Connecticut She was a senior on the 2008–09 Connecticut Huskies women's basketball team that went undefeated and won the National Championship.

Williams attended Bergen Catholic High School where he played football for two years and ran track for three. As a junior, he recorded 11 receptions for 229 yards and three touchdowns. As a senior in 2004, he set the single-season school records for 45 receptions, 897 receiving yards, and 12 touchdowns. On special teams, he returned nine kickoffs for 308 yards. He was named an Associated Press second-team all-state, Newark Star Ledger second-team all-state, first-team all-group, All-North Jersey, and all-county player. He was also named a PrepStar All-East region and SuperPrep All-Northeast player. Williams was recruited by Maryland, Syracuse, West Virginia, and Wisconsin. He chose to attend Maryland, due to a desire to play in the Atlantic Coast Conference (ACC), stay close to home, and the Terrapins' three winning seasons from 2001 to 2003.

== College career ==
At Maryland, Williams majored in American Studies. As a true freshman in 2005, he played in four games and recorded one reception for four yards. The following season, he saw action in all 13 games including 11 starts. He finished as the team's fourth-leading receiver with 28 receptions and three touchdowns. For the 2007 season, he was replaced at the X receiver position by sophomore Darrius Heyward-Bey. Williams was moved to Z receiver where he shared playing time with redshirt freshman LaQuan Williams. Wide receivers coach Bryan Bossard said, "Isaiah Williams is more talented than Darrius Heyward-Bey ... I've told him that; I've told Darrius that—talking about God-given ability, running, catching the ball, speed, height. Darrius just outworks him, and that's why he's had all the success he's had." That year, Williams played in all 13 games, including six starts and recorded 395 receiving yards to finish second on the team. In 2008, Williams again played in 13 games with six starts. He recorded six receptions, including a 43-yard touchdown from receiver Danny Oquendo on a trick play against Eastern Michigan.

== Professional career ==
=== Baltimore Ravens ===
Williams was not selected in the 2009 NFL draft, but was signed as an undrafted free agent soon after by the Baltimore Ravens. At the University of Maryland Pro Day on March 11, 2009, Williams posted impressive numbers with a 40-yard dash time of 4.38 seconds, a 60-yard shuttle time of 11.10 seconds, a 20-yard shuttle time of 4.24 seconds, and a vertical jump of 41 inches. On July 28, 2009, the Ravens released him.

=== Pittsburgh Steelers ===
The Pittsburgh Steelers signed Williams as a free agent on May 11, 2010, to fill in for wide receiver Limas Sweed who was placed on injured reserve. Williams was released by the Steelers on August 23, 2010.

=== Arizona Cardinals ===
The Arizona Cardinals signed Williams as a free agent on August 30, 2010. He was released in the final preseason cuts, but subsequently signed to the practice squad. Williams caught a game-winning touchdown in a preseason game against the Oakland Raiders on August 11, 2011. He was released on September 2, but again signed to the team's practice squad. On November 15, 2011, Williams was released from the team.

=== Seattle Seahawks ===
Williams was signed to the practice squad of the Seattle Seahawks on November 22, 2011. He was released on January 9, 2012.

=== Second Stint with Cardinals ===
Williams re-signed with the Arizona Cardinals on January 10, 2012.

=== Oakland Raiders ===
Williams signed a future contract with the Oakland Raiders on January 3, 2013. On August 25, 2013, he was waived by the Raiders.

=== Tennessee Titans ===
Williams signed a future contract with the Tennessee Titans on January 8, 2014. The Titans waived Williams on August 26, 2014.
