= Chase Bullock =

American gridiron football player (born 1986)

No. 55
- Position: Linebacker

Personal information
- Born: February 13, 1986 (age 40); Durham, North Carolina, U.S.
- Listed height: 6 ft 3 in (1.91 m)
- Listed weight: 234 lb (106 kg)

Career information
- College: Maryland
- NFL draft: 2009: undrafted

Career history
- Arizona Cardinals (2009)*; New York Sentinels (2009); BC Lions (2010)
- * Offseason or practice squad member only

Chase Bullock (born February 13, 1986) is an American former football linebacker. He was signed as an undrafted free agent by the Arizona Cardinals in 2009. He played college football at Maryland.

== Early life ==
Bullock was born in Durham, North Carolina to parents Sharon Bullock and Fitzgerald Terry. He attended Northern High School where he was a three-year starter in football and also played basketball and ran track. In his final two years, he recorded 277 tackles, with 150 as a senior. After his final season, he was named as an All-Piedmont Conference, all-area, SuperPrep Mid-Atlantic all-region, and PrepStar all-region player. He was recruited by Clemson, Maryland, NC State, South Carolina, and Virginia.

== College career ==
Bullock chose to attend the University of Maryland, where he majored in criminology and criminal justice. He sat out 2004 as a redshirt. The following season, he played in one game where he recorded four assisted tackles against Temple. In 2006, he played in six games as a back-up linebacker and in a special teams role, recording six tackles. In 2007, Bullock saw action in eight games at "Mike" linebacker behind Dave Philistin, but was plagued by ankle injuries. He saw action in all 13 games of the 2008 season and started one game as a "Will" linebacker. Against NC State, he recorded a career single-game high with eleven tackles after he replaced an injured Philistin.

== Professional career ==
=== Arizona Cardinals ===
Bullock signed as an undrafted free agent with the Arizona Cardinals on April 27, 2009. He was waived on September 4, 2009.

=== New York Sentinels ===
Bullock signed with the New York Sentinels of the United Football League in 2009.

=== BC Lions ===
In August 2010, the BC Lions of the Canadian Football League signed Bullock.
