= Edwin Williams (American football) =

American football player (born 1986)

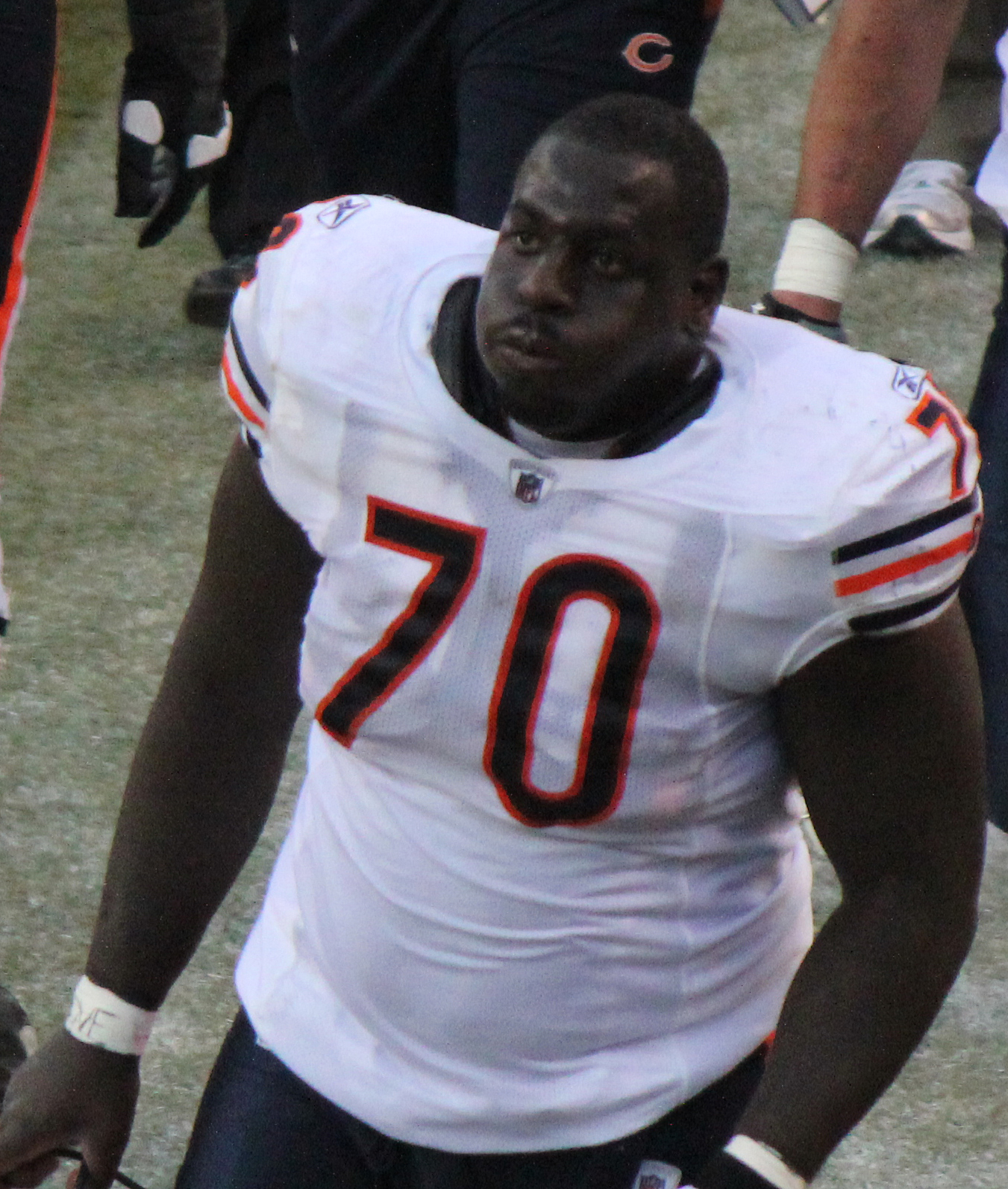
- Williams with the Bears in 2011

No. 50, 70
- Position: Center / Offensive guard

Personal information
- Born: December 10, 1986 (age 39); Washington, D.C., U.S.
- Listed height: 6 ft 3 in (1.91 m)
- Listed weight: 315 lb (143 kg)

Career information
- High school: DeMatha Catholic (Hyattsville, Maryland)
- College: Maryland
- NFL draft: 2009: undrafted

Career history
- Washington Redskins (2009); Chicago Bears (2010–2012)

Awards and highlights
- First-team All-ACC (2008)

Career NFL statistics
- Games played: 29
- Games started: 14
- Stats at Pro Football Reference

Edwin Williams (born December 10, 1986) is an American former professional football player who was a center and offensive guard in the National Football League (NFL). He played college football for the Maryland Terrapins. He was signed by the Washington Redskins in 2009 as an undrafted free agent.

== Early life ==
Williams was born on December 10, 1986, in Washington, D.C., to Edwin and Cheron Williams. Both of his parents were freebase cocaine users, and he and his sister, Danielle, were born addicted, although they suffered no long-term effects. Williams was raised by his maternal grandparents, Thomas and Orlean Pierce, in Deanwood, a low-income neighborhood in Northeast D.C.

He attended DeMatha Catholic High School in Hyattsville, Maryland, where he initially played basketball. In his junior year, he switched to football and saw action at offensive guard, offensive tackle, and defensive end. During his senior year in 2003, he recorded 78 tackles and six sacks. He was named a Washington Post first-team All-Met, Pigskin Club first-team All-Met, first-team All-Washington Catholic Athletic Conference (WCAC), first-team all-county, first-team All-Gazette, SuperPrep Mid-Atlantic all-region, and PrepStar all-region player.

He was recruited by Maryland, Pittsburgh, and Virginia Tech.

== College career ==
In 2004, Williams sat out the season as a redshirt and was named the offensive scout team player of the year. In 2005, he saw action in ten games, in which he participated in 145 plays while allowing only one sack. In 2006, Williams started in all 13 games. Played as part of the Maryland offensive line, which allowed 19 sacks, the second-lowest in the Atlantic Coast Conference (ACC). In 2007, he again started in all 13 games. Williams received the 2008 Wilma Rudolph Award, a national honor for intercollegiate athletes who have overcome adversity.

He entered the 2008 season as a consensus preseason first-team All-ACC pick, first-team preseason selection by The Sporting News. He was also named to watch list for the 2008 Rimington Trophy for most outstanding center in the nation. He started in all 13 games for the third consecutive season and recorded one solo tackle. He was named a first-team All-ACC player. He was invited to participate in the 2009 East-West Shrine Game and the 2009 NFL Combine.

Williams graduated in May 2008 with a communications degree, and began his graduate studies during his final season of eligibility.

== Professional career ==
=== Washington Redskins ===
NFL Draft Scout rated him as the seventh-ranked out of 91 center prospects for the 2009 NFL draft and projected him as a sixth-round selection. Williams was not selected in the draft, but was signed immediately afterwards alongside Missouri quarterback Chase Daniel. Williams played in four games for Washington, including two starts as a right guard, during the 2009 season.

=== Chicago Bears ===
Williams was cut by the Redskins during the 2010 preseason, and subsequently signed by the Chicago Bears. He was elevated to the active roster on September 27, 2010. In Week 16 against the Green Bay Packers, Williams scored a touchdown on a fumble recovery in the endzone after running back Kahlil Bell fumbled on the goalline.

On August 30, 2013, Williams was released from the Bears as part of final roster cuts.
