= Obi Egekeze =

American football player (born 1985)

No. 39
- Position: Placekicker

Personal information
- Born: November 8, 1985 (age 40); Augusta, Georgia
- Listed height: 6 ft 2 in (1.88 m)
- Listed weight: 210 lb (95 kg)

Career information
- High school: Westside High School, Augusta, Georgia
- College: Maryland

Career history
- 2006–2008: Maryland

Chukwuemeka Obi Egekeze (born November 8, 1985) is an American former football placekicker. He played college football for the University of Maryland from 2006 to 2008. He was the team's starting placekicker in 2007 and 2008, scoring 164 points, kicking 32 field goals, and converting 68 consecutive extra points without a miss during the 2007 and 2008 regular seasons. He ranks tenth in scoring in the 100-plus-year history of the Maryland Terrapins football program.

== Early life ==
Egekeze was born in Augusta, Georgia in 1985. He attended Westside High School in Augusta, where he was a three-year starter in football, basketball and soccer. A placekicker and punter for the school's football team, he was selected as an all-state player as a senior. Egekze also maintained a high school grade point average of 3.86 and was recruited to play college football by several major universities, including the University of Georgia, Ohio State University, University of Texas, and Penn State. He accepted a scholarship to attend the University of Maryland.

== University of Maryland ==
During the 2006 season, Egekeze handled kickoffs for the Maryland Terrapins after competing with Dan Ennis for the starting job as placekicker. He became the Terrapins' starting placekicker both in 2007 and 2008. Egekeze started all 26 games for the Terrapins in 2007 and 2008, scoring 164 points on 68 extra points (68-of-69 converted) and 32 field goals (32-for-47 converted). He ranks tenth in scoring in the history of the Maryland football program.

Egekeze suffered a slump early in the 2008 season that included five consecutive missed field goal attempts (three of which hit an upright). In late September 2008, a writer for The Baltimore Sun wrote: "Here's a bad sign. I Googled 'Egekeze' and 'crossbar' and came up with 986 hits." As word of the slump spread, Egekeze received advice and encouragement from kickers across the United States, including Kansas City Chiefs kicker, Nick Novak and Pro Football Hall of Famer Jan Stenerud. Egekeze said at the time, "It is completely different talking to another kicker who has had those up-and-down days. We all watch each other's stats and know how everyone is doing. We all know." Egekeze regained his form and converted several key field goals that led to important wins for the 2008 Maryland Terrapins football team, including a game-winning kick in the rain during the closing seconds against North Carolina State, another game-winning kick against North Carolina to move Maryland into first place in the Atlantic Coast Conference, and four field goals in a single game against #21 ranked Wake Forest.

The slump and Egekeze's comeback after receiving support from fellow kickers was the subject of extensive press coverage in 2008 and 2009.

Egekeze received his undergraduate degree in finance in May 2008, but remained at the University of Maryland as a graduate student in international business. He was twice selected as an Academic All-ACC player.

== Later years and family ==
Egekeze subsequently signed to play professional football for the Omaha Nighthawks as an undrafted free agent in 2010. Egekeze completed his MBA at University of Illinois at Urbana-Champaign in 2013. During his time at Illinois he started the U of I chapter of Uplifting Athletes, a national nonprofit organization aligning college football with rare diseases and raising them as a national priority through outreach, research, education and advocacy.

His brother Ndu Egekeze played basketball for Penn State from 2000 to 2004. Another brother, Nkem Egekeze, played soccer at Mercer University.
