= Travis Baltz =

American football player (born 1988)

No. 5
- Position: Punter

Personal information
- Born: November 18, 1988 (age 37); Toledo, Ohio, U.S.
- Listed height: 6 ft 3 in (1.91 m)
- Listed weight: 210 lb (95 kg)

Career information
- High school: Anthony Wayne (OH)
- College: Maryland
- NFL draft: 2011: undrafted

Career history
- Indianapolis Colts (2011)*; New York Jets (2012)*
- * Offseason or practice squad member only

Awards and highlights
- First-team All-ACC (2008)
- Stats at Pro Football Reference

Travis Baltz (born November 18, 1988) is an American former football punter. He was signed by the Indianapolis Colts as an undrafted free agent in 2011. He played college football at Maryland.

== Early life ==
Travis Baltz was born on November 18, 1988, in Toledo, Ohio, to parents Jim and Debbie Baltz. He grew up in Waterville, Ohio, and attended Anthony Wayne High School where he played football, soccer, basketball, and bowling. In football, he played as a punter and placekicker. As a punter, he averaged 42 yards per punt in his junior year and 40 yards per punt in his senior year. As a placekicker in his junior year, he made good five of nine field goal attempts. As a senior placekicker, he made good five of six field goal attempts and 78% of his kickoffs went for touchbacks.

As a junior in 2005, he was named an All-Toledo Blade punter. As both a senior and junior, he was named an all-state and Associated Press honorable mention All-Ohio Division II punter. As a senior in 2006, he was named a first-team all-district and first-team All-Northern Lakes League punter, and first-team all-conference and All-Toledo Blade placekicker.

Baltz was not actively recruited out of high school. He wished to attend Maryland and contacted special teams coach Ray Rychleski, whom he provided with film footage. Baltz's desire to attend Maryland was solidified after he visited its College Park campus, and the nearby cities of Baltimore and Washington, D.C. Baltz attended summer camp at Maryland where he received praise from former Maryland kicker Nick Novak, but he still was not extended an offer. He considered Eastern Michigan, Northwestern, and Ohio State, the latter of which had shown interest and requested film. He considered many schools in the country, with academics and football as the primary criteria. His father recommended giving up on Maryland, but Baltz said, "Every school could have offered me and I still would have chosen Maryland." Eventually, Maryland did extend a scholarship offer to Baltz.

== College career ==
As a true freshman in 2007, Baltz started in all 13 games and averaged 40.9 yards per punt. In Atlantic Coast Conference (ACC) games, he averaged 43.1 yards per punt. Against FIU, he placed five punts inside their 20-yard line, the most be any Maryland punter since Brooks Barnard in 2001. During the course of the season, Baltz pinned 16 punts inside the opponents' 20-yard line. He recorded a career-long 65-yard punt against Georgia Tech, which in the fourth quarter along with a 55-yard punt helped ensure a Maryland victory. He was named a The Sporting News freshman All-American, The Sporting News freshman All-ACC, and Rivals.com freshman All-ACC player.

In 2008, Baltz punted 61 times for 2,506 yards, an average of 41.1 yards, with a long of 59 yards. He recorded seven touchbacks and 24 punts inside the opponents' 20-yard line. He also served as the back-up kickoff specialist, and saw action usually in onside kick attempts. He executed five kickoffs for 243 yards, a 48.6 yard average, one touchback, and two out-of-bounds. He received first-team All-ACC honors. Baltz was named to the 2009 preseason All-ACC team. He was also placed on the Ray Guy Award watch list. NFL Draft Scout rates Baltz as number-six out of 34 punters assessed for the 2011 NFL Draft.

== Professional career ==
Baltz was signed by the Indianapolis Colts as an undrafted free agent following the 2011 NFL draft on July 26, 2011. He was waived during final roster cuts on September 3, 2011. The New York Jets signed Baltz to a future/reserve contract on January 6, 2012. He was waived on August 12.
