= Dave Philistin =

American football player (born 1986)

No. 34
- Position: Linebacker

Personal information
- Born: September 24, 1986 (age 40); Manchester, New Hampshire, U.S.
- Listed height: 6 ft 1 in (1.85 m)
- Listed weight: 235 lb (107 kg)

Career information
- High school: Manchester (NH) Central
- College: Maryland
- NFL draft: 2009: undrafted

Career history
- Seattle Seahawks (2009)*; Kiel Baltic Hurricanes (2010)
- * Offseason or practice squad member only

Dave Philistin (born September 24, 1986) is an American former football linebacker and CEO and founder of Candor, a cloud-based managed IT services company. He played for the Maryland Terrapins at the University of Maryland. Philistin is a 2011 UFL Draft choice of the Las Vegas Locomotives.

== Early life ==
Philistin was born in Manchester, New Hampshire, to mother Liz Murphy. His brother, Jacques, played football as a nose tackle at Norfolk State University where he earned All-American honors. Dave attended Manchester Central High School where he played football for four years. As a sophomore, he played as a defensive end, before moving to inside linebacker and tailback for his final two years. He also letter twice in track and field, with his events being sprints and shot put.

As a senior, he recorded 108 tackles, one interception returned for a touchdown, 4.5 quarterback sacks, one blocked punt that he also returned for a touchdown, and one fumble recovery. That year as a tailback, he rushed for 1,002 yards and 13 touchdowns. During his senior season, the team went 13–0 and won the state championship.

In high school, Philistin was named an all-state player three times. His senior year, ESPN named him the number-five outside linebacker in the nation. He was named a PrepStar All-American, SuperPrep All-New England selection, and 2004 New Hampshire player of the year. Philistin was recruited by Maryland, Boston College, Michigan, Ohio State, and West Virginia. Philistin said one of the reasons he chose Maryland was because "The coaches were a great fit here. I wanted to go to a school that wasn't too far, but where I felt like I was on my own."

== College career ==
At Maryland, Philistin majored in American studies. In 2005, Phlistin saw action in 10 of 11 games as a true freshman reserve linebacker, and recorded seven tackles, five of which were solo, half of a tackle for loss, and one quarterback hurry. In 2006, he played in all 13 games again as a reserve and also in a special teams role. Philistin started twice at the "Sam" linebacker position. He recorded 15 solo tackles and 5.5 tackles for loss.

2007 was Philistin's breakout season, and he started in all 13 games at the "Mike" linebacker position. He recorded 124 total tackles, four broken-up passes, and one forced fumble and recovery. Philistin finished second on the team in total tackles, behind Erin Henderson, fourth in the Atlantic Coast Conference (ACC), and 38th in the nation. He was named an All-ACC nominee.

In 2008, he was moved to the "Will" linebacker position. He played in all 13 games and started in 12, despite suffering a shoulder injury. He again ranked second on the team in total tackles with 94, behind Alex Wujciak. In the upset win against 23rd-ranked California, Philistin led the team with 13 tackles, including one for loss. ESPN named Philistin, alongside Moise Fokou, as one of the key impact players in that game.

Before the season, he was placed on the Bronko Nagurski Trophy and Lombardi Award watchlists. Philistin was named a consensus preseason first-team All-ACC, first-team Sporting News, Blue Ribbon, and Lindy's and second-team Athlon player. Lindy's also ranked him as the 11th inside linebacker in that nation. He was also an All-ACC nominee.

== Professional career ==
=== Seattle Seahawks ===
Philistin was signed as an undrafted free agent by the Seattle Seahawks. The NFL Draft Scout had ranked Philistin 20th among 149 inside linebacker prospects for the 2009 draft. It said that, despite being undersized for the NFL, he is an excellent tackler, especially against rushers. The Sporting News projected Philistin as a sixth-round selection, noting that his key strengths were intelligence, persistence, and an ability to quickly read the run. It noted that his size might predispose him towards being a career reserve, although he was considered "a solid late-round pick for a team in a 3–4 scheme."
