= Travis Ivey =

American football player (born 1986)

No. 94
- Position: Nose tackle

Personal information
- Born: December 22, 1986 (age 39); Washington, D.C., U.S.
- Listed height: 6 ft 4 in (1.93 m)
- Listed weight: 341 lb (155 kg)

Career information
- High school: Riverdale Baptist (Upper Marlboro, Maryland)
- College: Maryland
- NFL draft: 2010: undrafted

Career history
- Miami Dolphins (2010)*; Cleveland Browns (2010); Oakland Raiders (2011–2012)*
- * Offseason or practice squad member only

Career NFL statistics
- Total tackles: 1
- Stats at Pro Football Reference

Travis Ivey (born December 22, 1986) is an American former professional football player who was a nose tackle in the National Football League (NFL). He was signed by the Miami Dolphins as an undrafted free agent in 2010. He played college football for the Maryland Terrapins.

== College career ==
=== Maryland (2006-2009) ===
Ivey redshirted his freshman year and played a reserve role as a sophomore and the beginning of his junior year. Ivey started the final four games of his junior year and all 12 games of his senior year.

== Professional career ==
=== Miami Dolphins ===
After going undrafted in the 2010 NFL draft, Ivey signed with the Miami Dolphins. He was waived on August 23.

=== Cleveland Browns ===
Ivey signed with the Cleveland Browns on August 25, 2010.

=== Oakland Raiders ===
He signed with the Oakland Raiders during the 2011 season and was placed on their practice squad. He was cut several days into the team's 2012 training camp after failing to finish a conditioning run.
