= Jeremy Navarre =

American football player (born 1987)

No. 94, 69, 92
- Position: Defensive end

Personal information
- Born: March 16, 1987 (age 39); Joppatowne, Maryland, U.S.
- Listed height: 6 ft 3 in (1.91 m)
- Listed weight: 279 lb (127 kg)

Career information
- College: Maryland
- NFL draft: 2009: undrafted

Career history
- Jacksonville Jaguars (2009); Arizona Cardinals (2010–2011)*; Sacramento Mountain Lions (2011); Virginia Destroyers (2011)
- * Offseason or practice squad member only

Career NFL statistics
- Total tackles: 5
- Stats at Pro Football Reference

Jeremy Navarre (born March 16, 1987) is an American former professional football player who was a defensive end in the National Football League (NFL). He was signed by the Jacksonville Jaguars as an undrafted free agent in 2009. He played college football for the Maryland Terrapins.

Navarre was also a member of the Arizona Cardinals, Sacramento Mountain Lions and Virginia Destroyers.

== Early life ==
He was born on March 16, 1987, in Joppatowne, Maryland, to parents George and Sherri Navarre. Jeremy Navarre attended Joppatowne High School where he played football as a fullback and defensive end for his last three years. As a senior in 2004, Navarre recorded 145 tackles (110 solo), 11 sacks, four fumble recoveries, and 15 receptions for 290 yards and three touchdowns. He was twice named a consensus first-team all-state and Baltimore Sun first-team All-Met player. As a junior, he was named the Baltimore Sun Athlete of the Year, and, as a senior, he was named the Harford County defensive player of the year.

SuperPrep named Navarre an All-American and the number-two prospective fullback recruit in the nation. PrepStar named him an All-Atlantic region player. Navarre was recruited by Maryland, Penn State, Boston College, and Virginia.

In addition to his being a standout on the football field, Navarre was a two-time Maryland state wrestling champion. He passed up a chance for a third title by enrolling early at the University of Maryland during the spring semester of his senior year of high school so that he could participate in the Terps' spring football workouts.

== College career ==
In 2005, Navarre saw action in all 11 games and started in 10 as a true freshman at defensive end. He recorded 25 tackles including 2.5 for loss and broke up one pass.

In 2006, he played in all 13 games and started in 12. Navarre recorded 47 tackles including 9.5 for loss. He tied for first on the team in sacks with 3.5. Against Florida State, he took part in what was just the second Maryland win in the series. Navarre preserved a win for the Terps by blocking a field goal attempt which would have tied the game with 49 seconds remaining. During the game, he compiled five tackles including 2.5 for loss and an eight-yard sack. He also forced a fumble and ended a fourth-down run. The offense managed to capitalize on both efforts with touchdowns in the ensuing possessions. For his performance, he was named the Atlantic Coast Conference (ACC) Co-Defensive Lineman of the Week.

In 2007, Navarre started in all 13 games. He recorded 5.5 sacks to tie for second on the team. He tied for third in forced fumbles with two. He was awarded the team's James M. Tatum Award for the top defensive lineman.

In 2008, he was moved to defensive tackle where he started in the first nine games. For the remaining four games, he was moved back to defensive end. He recorded 70 tackles and ranked first in the ACC for tackles by a defensive lineman. He also posted 2.5 sacks, 7.5 passes broken up, and one forced fumble. He was named an honorable mention All-ACC player by both the ACC and the Associated Press. He was invited to appear in the Texas vs. The Nation Game. At the end of the season, Navarre received the Ray Krouse Award as the team's most valuable player and his second consecutive James M. Tatum Award for most outstanding defensive lineman.

== Professional career ==
=== Pre-draft ===
At the NFL Combine Navarre measured : 6'2" 276 and ran a 4.84 40-yard dash and did 36 reps in the 225-pound bench press.

=== Jacksonville Jaguars ===
Navarre went undrafted in the 2009 NFL draft, but was signed as a free agent by the Jacksonville Jaguars shortly thereafter. The NFL Draft Scout had ranked him as 24th among 210 defensive end prospects for the draft. It also said, "Navarre proved himself a versatile defender who was a force whether playing outside in a 3–4 alignment or inside with four down linemen. Coach Fridge [Ralph Friedgen] has been telling scouts for some time that Navarre's talent, hustling, and work ethic is exemplary."

Navarre was added to the practice squad on September 7, 2009, and then activated to the 53-man roster on September 17. He was waived on September 28. The Jaguars re-signed Navarre to their practice squad on September 30. Shortly after he was signed back to the 53-man roster.

He was released in the final cuts before the 2010 season.

Navarre was then signed by the Arizona Cardinals. He was released before the 2011 NFL season and then joined the UFL and played with the Virginia Destroyers for the 2011 season.
