= Ronnie Tyler =

American football player (born 1988)

No. 24 – Maryland Terrapins
- Position: Wide receiver
- Class: Junior

Personal information
- Born: October 10, 1988 (age 38); Wagener, South Carolina, U.S.
- Listed height: 5 ft 10 in (1.78 m)
- Listed weight: 190 lb (86 kg)

Career information
- High school: Wagener Salley High School, Wagener, SC; Hargrave Military Academy, Chatham, VA
- College: Maryland (2008–present)

Awards and highlights
- Stats at ESPN

Ronnie Tyler (born October 10, 1988) is an American former college football player. He played wide receiver for the Maryland Terrapins of the University of Maryland.

== Early life ==
Tyler was born in Wagener, South Carolina, to minister Ronnie and mother Deborah Tyler. His brother Rontreal played football at The Citadel from 2003 to 2006. Ronnie Tyler attended Wagener Salley High School where he played football as a tailback, wide receiver, and quarterback. During his high school career, he accumulated over 3,200 rushing yards and 40 touchdowns. His senior year, he had 62 carries for 552 yards and a touchdown and made 41 receptions for 664 yards and seven touchdowns, two kickoff returns for touchdowns, and four interception returns for touchdowns.

As a senior, he was named an Associated Press all-state and a SuperPrep All-American player. He participated in the 2006 South Carolina North-South All-Star game. He consistently recorded a 4.4 second 40-yard dash and posted a 35-inch vertical at the Nike Combine in Athens, Georgia.

He attended boarding school at the Hargrave Military Academy in Chatham, Virginia. While there, he was rated as the 35th-ranked prep school prospect in the nation. Scouts, Inc. named him the 47th-ranked running back in the nation.

He was recruited by Maryland, Georgia, Clemson, North Carolina, South Carolina, Virginia Tech, and Wake Forest.

== College career ==
In 2008, Tyler placed at the number-two slot receiver position on the depth chart. He played in all 13 games and started in one, recording 20 receptions for 225 yards and a 14-yard touchdown in the 2008 Humanitarian Bowl against Nevada. During the 31–0 loss to Virginia, Tyler made five receptions for 56 yards.
