= Danny Oquendo =

American football player (born 1988)

No. 17
- Position: Wide receiver

Personal information
- Born: July 8, 1987 (age 39); Hackensack, New Jersey, U.S.
- Listed height: 6 ft 0 in (1.83 m)
- Listed weight: 190 lb (86 kg)

Career information
- High school: Hackensack, (Hackensack, NJ)
- College: Maryland (2005–2008)
- Stats at ESPN

Daniel Oquendo, Jr. (/oʊˈkɛndoʊ/; born July 8, 1987) is an American former college football player. He was a wide receiver for the Maryland Terrapins of the University of Maryland.

After the death of his autistic half-brother, Avonte Oquendo, in October 2013 in an incident which gained national headlines, Danny has determined to study law.

== Early life ==
Oquendo was born in Hackensack, New Jersey, to Daniel Oquendo, Sr., and Ana Garcia. He attended Hackensack High School where he was a three-year starter as a wide receiver and safety. As a junior, he led the team in tackles and returned two punts and a kick for touchdowns. As a senior in 2004, he caught 45 passes for 843 yards and nine touchdowns, returned seven punts for 125 yards, returned 12 kickoffs for 293 yards, made two quarterback sacks, three interceptions, and 81 tackles including 53 solo. As a junior, he was named an all-league and all-county player. As a senior, he was named an all-league, all-county, and PrepStar All-East Region player. He was also posted the fourth-best time (7.62) in the high hurdles in the nation.

Oquendo was recruited by Maryland, Virginia Tech, Boston College, Purdue, and Rutgers.

== College career ==
In 2005, Oquendo saw action in all 11 games as a true freshman including one start. Oquendo posted three receptions for 20 yards. On special teams, he posted ten tackles and two fumble recoveries. In 2006, he played in all 13 games including 5 starts, mostly at slot receiver. He caught 34 passes for 396 yards and two touchdowns, and was the second-highest receiving yards leader on the team. He returned 12 punts for 218 yards. In 2007, after starting quarterback Jordan Steffy was injured mid-season, he briefly participated in an open tryout for a reservist to provide more depth at the position. Oquendo played in the first nine games and made 19 receptions before suffering a season-ending knee injury during practice.

In 2008, Oquendo saw action in all 13 games including five starts. He made 29 receptions for 371 yards including two touchdowns and a 50-yard long. Due to his sure hands, Oquendo was quarterback Chris Turner's preferred third-down receiver, and caught 13 passes on third downs, all of which gained enough yardage to convert to a first down. Star Z receiver Darrius Heyward-Bey said, "I tell people [Turner] doesn’t look my way on third down, he's looking for Danny … I’ve been telling people all year. I even told a [defensive back] one time in the game 'He ain't coming my way.' Danny’s the man." On special teams, Oquendo returned 20 punt returns for 104 yards when he was utilized in that position for his reliable hands rather than an elusive returning ability. Oquendo also recorded one completion on two trick play pass attempts for a 43-yard touchdown.

== Death of his brother ==
Danny Oquendo's half-brother, Avonte Oquendo, was an autistic 14-year-old boy who, in September 2013, began as a freshman at a special education school within the newly constructed Riverview School in Long Island City, a neighborhood in the New York City borough of Queens. Avonte slipped out of the school the following month, leading to a widely broadcast search for him. Danny left his job in Florida to help in the search and took a strong lead in urging attention on it over the next three months, until his brother's remains were found on the Queens bank of the East River in January 2014.

Through contact with Gary Mayerson, an attorney who specializes in legal services for children with autism and whose firm had offered a monetary award for the search for Avonte, Danny was motivated to resume his university studies in the field of law, with a focus on special education law. He was accepted by New York Law School in Manhattan, which offers a specialization in this field, and planned to begin his studies in Fall 2014.

== Sources ==
- Quietly, Terps' Oquendo makes a resounding impact, The Washington Post, November 21, 2008.
- 'Tough guys' on the Terps, The Baltimore Sun, September 2008.
- Oquendo uses speed as hurdler on track team, The Diamondback, April 19, 2007.
- 'The New Breed' has more confidence than experience, The Herald-Mail, September 8, 2006.
- Rutgers' Resurgence Is Like Day, Knights, The Washington Post, September 29, 2007.
- "Sack comes back". The Record. October 23, 2004. Archived from the original on October 25, 2012 – via HighBeam Research.
- Terps WR status for Wake still unclear, The America's Intelligence Wire, Financial Times, November 22, 2006.
- Looking for catches before happy returns, The Washington Times, August 12, 2008.
