= Lance Ball =

American football player (born 1985)

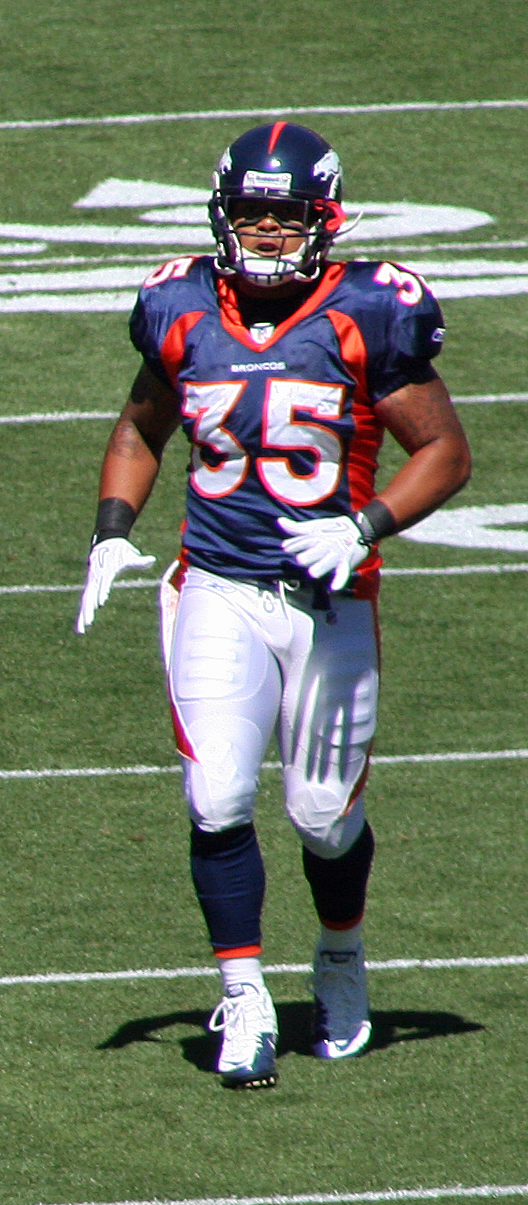
- Ball with the Denver Broncos in 2010

No. 27, 35
- Position: Running back

Personal information
- Born: June 19, 1985 (age 41); Teaneck, New Jersey, U.S.
- Listed height: 5 ft 9 in (1.75 m)
- Listed weight: 220 lb (100 kg)

Career information
- High school: Teaneck (NJ)
- College: Maryland
- NFL draft: 2008: undrafted

Career history
- St. Louis Rams (2008)*; Indianapolis Colts (2008); Tennessee Titans (2009)*; Denver Broncos (2009–2012)
- * Offseason or practice squad member only

Awards and highlights
- Second-team All-ACC (2005)

Career NFL statistics
- Rushing attempts: 192
- Rushing yards: 801
- Rushing touchdowns: 2
- Receptions: 27
- Receiving yards: 230
- Receiving touchdowns: 2
- Stats at Pro Football Reference

Lance Ball (born June 19, 1985) is an American former professional football player who was a running back in the National Football League (NFL). He was signed by the St. Louis Rams as an undrafted free agent in 2008. He played college football for the Maryland Terrapins.

Ball was also a member of the Indianapolis Colts, Tennessee Titans, and Denver Broncos.

== Early life ==
Ball was born in Teaneck, New Jersey. He is a 2003 graduate of Teaneck High School, where he rushed for 3,403 yards and 39 touchdowns in his high school career.

== College career ==
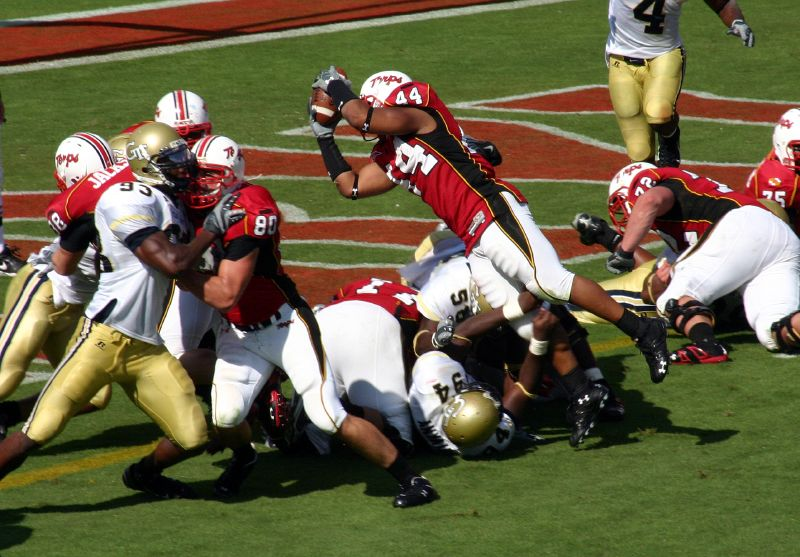
Lance Ball dives for a touchdown to put the Terps up 28–17 during a 2007 game vs. Georgia Tech.

Ball played college football at the University of Maryland, College Park. He had four 100-yard games in his last seven starts during his sophomore season, and emerged as one of the top running backs in the ACC, rushing for 903 yards with six touchdowns. He was the third-leading rusher in the conference with an 82.1 per-game average, and earned second-team All-ACC honors. In his junior season, he again led the team in rushing with 815 yards. He majored in family studies and minored in community health. As a senior, he had 768 rushing yards and 12 rushing touchdowns.

== Professional career ==
=== St. Louis Rams ===
Ball was not selected in the 2008 NFL draft, but was signed as an undrafted free agent by the St. Louis Rams. He was signed to their practice squad on September 1, 2008. He was released from the practice squad on September 30.

=== Indianapolis Colts ===
Ball was signed to the practice squad of the Indianapolis Colts on October 12, 2008. He was activated from the practice squad on December 28, 2008, and had his NFL debut on the same date.

An exclusive-rights free agent in the 2009 offseason, Ball was re-signed by the Colts on March 17.

=== Tennessee Titans ===
On October 8, 2009, Ball was signed to the Tennessee Titans practice squad.

=== Denver Broncos ===
Ball was signed to the Denver Broncos' practice squad on November 3. Ball was signed to a reserve/futures contract on January 5, 2010. On September 21, 2010, Ball was waived by the Denver Broncos. On the 2010 season, he had 158 rushing yards in ten games.

Ball caught a touchdown pass on September 12, 2011, in Denver's season opener against the Oakland Raiders. On November 13, 2011, running back Knowshon Moreno suffered an injury, opening the door for Ball to rush for 96 yards on 30 carries in a win over the Kansas City Chiefs.

After Moreno was declared out for the year, Ball finished the 2011 season with 96 carries for 402 yards and a score (all career highs). In the 2012 season, he had 42 carries for 158 rushing yards and a rushing touchdown to go along with seven receptions for 61 yards and a receiving touchdown. He was released on August 31, 2013.

== Personal life ==
On June 6, 2023, Ball was arrested in Douglas County, Colorado, on suspicion of assault and domestic violence.
