= Keon Lattimore =

American football player (born 1984)

No. 29, 35
- Position: Running back

Personal information
- Born: July 6, 1984 (age 42); Lakeland, Florida, U.S.
- Listed height: 5 ft 11 in (1.80 m)
- Listed weight: 222 lb (101 kg)

Career information
- High school: Mount Saint Joseph, Hargrave Military Academy
- College: Maryland (2004–2007)

Career history
- Dallas Cowboys (2008)*; Jacksonville Jaguars (2008)*; Dallas Cowboys (2009); San Francisco 49ers (2009)*; Trenton Steel (2011); Chambersburg Cardinals (2011); Alabama Hammers (2015)
- * Offseason or practice squad member only

Keon Lattimore (born July 6, 1984) is an American former football running back. He played college football for the Maryland Terrapins, and was signed by the Dallas Cowboys as an undrafted free agent in April 2008.

Lattimore was featured on HBO's Hard Knocks during the 2008 training camp and preseason with the Cowboys. He is the younger brother of former Baltimore Ravens linebacker and Hall of Famer Ray Lewis.

== Early life ==
Lattimore attended Mount Saint Joseph High School in Baltimore, MD and played football, basketball and ran track. He was named MVP of the varsity football team in 2003, and won outdoor track championships all three years.

== College career ==
Lattimore played four seasons at the University of Maryland, College Park (2004-07). He rushed for 1,744 yards and 19 touchdowns during his career with the Terrapins.

As a junior against Virginia in 2006, Lattimore posted a career-high 151 all-purpose yards (114 rushing, 37 receiving), including a crucial 56-yard touchdown run. This performance earned him ACC Offensive Back of the Week.

As a senior against Rutgers in 2007, Lattimore rushed for a career-high 124 yards. He also led the ACC in rushing touchdowns with 13. Lattimore finished the season with a career-high 813 rushing yards.

== Professional career ==
Pre-draft measurables
Height	Weight	40-yard dash	10-yard split	20-yard split	20-yard shuttle	Three-cone drill	Vertical jump	Broad jump	Bench press
5 ft 11 in (1.80 m)	222 lb (101 kg)	4.58 s	1.64 s	2.72 s	4.52 s	7.20 s	35.0 in (0.89 m)	10 ft 0 in (3.05 m)	11 reps
All values from Pro Day

Lattimore was signed by the Dallas Cowboys as an undrafted free agent on April 28, 2008. He was released on August 30, 2008.

Lattimore was signed to the Jacksonville Jaguars practice squad on December 10, 2008. He was re-signed by the Cowboys the following offseason on May 1, 2009. Lattimore was placed on injured reserve on September 6, 2009, before being released on October 7, 2009.

He was signed to the San Francisco 49ers practice squad on October 21, 2009, where he spent the remainder of the season.

Lattimore also played indoor football for the Trenton Steel in 2011 and Alabama Hammers in 2015.
