= 2008 hurricane season =

2008 hurricane season may refer to:

- the 2008 Atlantic hurricane season
- the 2008 Pacific hurricane season

In sports:

- the 2008 season of the Miami Hurricanes football team
