= 2008 Virginia Tech Hokies football team =

American college football season

2008 Virginia Tech Hokies football

ACC champion ACC Coastal Division co-champion Orange Bowl champion

ACC Championship Game, W 30–12 vs. Boston College

Orange Bowl, W 20–7 vs. Cincinnati
- Conference: Atlantic Coast Conference
- Coastal Division

Ranking
- Coaches: No. 14
- AP: No. 15
- Record: 10–4 (5–3 ACC)
- Head coach: Frank Beamer (22nd season)
- Offensive coordinator: Bryan Stinespring (7th season)
- Offensive scheme: Pro-style
- Defensive coordinator: Bud Foster (14th season)
- Base defense: 4–4
- Home stadium: Lane Stadium

Uniform

2008 Atlantic Coast Conference football standings
	Conf.			Overall
Team	W		L	W		L
Atlantic Division
Boston College xy	5	–	3	9	–	5
No. 21 Florida State x	5	–	3	9	–	4
Maryland	4	–	4	8	–	5
Wake Forest	4	–	4	8	–	5
Clemson	4	–	4	7	–	6
NC State	4	–	4	6	–	7
Coastal Division
No. 15 Virginia Tech xy$	5	–	3	10	–	4
No. 22 Georgia Tech x	5	–	3	9	–	4
North Carolina	0	–	4	0	–	5
Miami (FL)	4	–	4	7	–	6
Virginia	3	–	5	5	–	7
Duke	1	–	7	4	–	8
Championship: Virginia Tech 30, Boston College 12
$ – BCS representative as conference champion; x – Division champion/co-champions; y – Championship game participant; North Carolina vacated 8 wins, including 4 ACC wins; Rankings from AP Poll

The 2008 Virginia Tech Hokies football team represented Virginia Polytechnic Institute and State University during the 2008 NCAA Division I FBS football season. The team's head coach was Frank Beamer. Prior to the season, the Hokies were expected to be in a rebuilding mode, recovering after the graduation of several key players. Despite that fact, Tech was picked to win the Atlantic Coast Conference's Coastal Division in the annual preseason poll of media covering the ACC. The Hokies were ranked the No. 15 team in the country at the start of the season, but suffered an upset loss to East Carolina in their first game. Tech recovered, however, and won five consecutive games following the loss, the ACC Championship, and the Orange Bowl. The 2008 season also remains the last time the Hokies went undefeated at home. Permanent team captains were Macho Harris, Orion Martin, Brett Warren, and Ryan Shuman.

== Schedule ==
Date	Time	Opponent	Rank	Site	TV	Result	Attendance
August 30	12:00 p.m.	vs. East Carolina*	No. 17	Bank of America Stadium; Charlotte, NC	ESPN	L 22–27	72,169
September 6	1:30 p.m.	Furman*		Lane Stadium; Blacksburg, VA	ACC Select	W 24–7	66,233
September 13	3:30 p.m.	Georgia Tech		Lane Stadium; Blacksburg, VA (Battle of the Techs)	ABC	W 20–17	66,233
September 20	3:30 p.m.	at North Carolina		Kenan Memorial Stadium; Chapel Hill, NC	ABC	W 20–17	59,800
September 27	8:00 p.m.	at Nebraska*		Memorial Stadium; Lincoln, NE	ABC	W 35–30	85,831
October 4	1:30 p.m.	Western Kentucky*^{†}	No. 20	Lane Stadium; Blacksburg, VA	ACC Select	W 27–13	66,233
October 18	8:00 p.m.	at Boston College	No. 17	Alumni Stadium; Chestnut Hill, MA (rivalry)	ESPN2	L 23–28	44,127
October 25	3:30 p.m.	at No. 24 Florida State		Doak Campbell Stadium; Tallahassee, FL	ABC	L 20–30	81,876
November 6	7:30 p.m.	No. 23 Maryland		Lane Stadium; Blacksburg, VA	ESPN	W 23–13	66,233
November 13	7:30 p.m.	at Miami (FL)		Dolphin Stadium; Miami Gardens, FL (rivalry)	ESPN	L 14–16	46,838
November 22	5:30 p.m.	Duke		Lane Stadium; Blacksburg, VA	ESPNU	W 14–3	66,233
November 29	12:00 p.m.	Virginia		Lane Stadium; Blacksburg, VA (Commonwealth Cup)	ESPN	W 17–14	66,233
December 6	1:00 p.m.	No. 18 Boston College		Raymond James Stadium; Tampa, FL (ACC Championship Game / rivalry)	ABC	W 30–12	53,927
January 1, 2009	8:30 p.m.	No. 12 Cincinnati*	No. 21	Dolphin Stadium; Miami Gardens, FL (Orange Bowl)	FOX	W 20–7	57,821
*Non-conference game; ^{†}Homecoming; Rankings from Coaches' Poll released prior to the game; All times are in Eastern time

Source: ACC

== Roster ==
Wide Receiver: Zach Luckett – (redshirt) Sophomore; Germond Oatneal – Freshman; 4 Marcus Davis – Freshman; 11 Dyrell Roberts – Freshman; 13 Xavier Boyce – Freshman; 80 Brandon Dillard – (redshirt) Junior; 81 Jarrett Boykin – Freshman; 83 Patrick Terry – (redshirt) Freshman; 85 Ervin Garner – (redshirt) Freshman; Split End: Randall Dunn – Freshman; Zac Evans – Freshman; 3 Ike Whitaker – (redshirt) Junior; 19 Danny Coale – (redshirt) Freshman; 87 Prince Parker – (redshirt) Sophomore; Center: James Brown – Freshman; Bo Gentry – Freshman; 58 Ryan Shuman – (redshirt) Senior; 60 Beau Warren – (redshirt) Sophomore; 61 Barrett Mears – (redshirt) Sophomore; Offensive Guard: Aaron Brown – (redshirt) Sophomore; Daniel Neal – Freshman; 65 Matt Baldwin – (redshirt) Freshman; 67 Nick Marshman – (redshirt) Junior; 68 Jaymes Brooks – (redshirt) Freshman; 69 Hivera Green – (redshirt) Junior; 70 Sergio Render – Junior; 76 Will Alvarez – (redshirt) Freshman; Offensive Tackle: Nick Becton – Freshman; 62 Blake DeChristopher – (redshirt) Freshman; 64 Richard Graham – (redshirt) Junior; 72 Andrew Lanier – (redshirt) Freshman; 74 Michael Via – Freshman; 75 Greg Nosal – (redshirt) Freshman; 77 Ed Wang – (redshirt) Junior; Tight End: Jacob Barron – Freshman; Nelson Ward – Freshman; 8 Greg Boone – (redshirt) Junior; 18 Sam Wheeler – (redshirt) Junior; 86 Chris Drager – (redshirt) Freshman; 88 Andre Smith – (redshirt) Sophomore; 98 Rob Stanton – (redshirt) Sophomore	Quarterback: Joseph Clayton – Freshman; Austin Decker – Freshman; 5 Tyrod Taylor – Sophomore; 7 Sean Glennon – (redshirt) Senior; 12 Cory Holt – (redshirt) Senior; 16 Jeff Beyer – Junior; 30 Brian Saunders – (redshirt) Sophomore; Tailback: 20 Kenny Lewis Jr. – Junior; 25 Josh Oglesby – (redshirt) Freshman; 27 Jahre Cheeseman – (redshirt) Junior; 32 Darren Evans – (redshirt) Freshman; 34 Ryan Williams – Freshman; 35 Dustin Pickle – Senior; Fullback: Josh Call – Freshman; Joey Phillips – Freshman; 31 Kenny Younger – Junior; 42 Kenny Jefferson – (redshirt) Junior; 44 Devin Perez – (redshirt) Senior; Defensive tackle: Antoine Hopkins – Freshman; Jeff Wardach – (redshirt) Freshman; 53 Dwight Tucker – Freshman; 56 Demetrius Taylor – (redshirt) Junior; 59 Courtney Prince – Freshman; 91 John Graves – (redshirt) Sophomore; 93 Kwamaine Battle – (redshirt) Freshman; 95 Cordarrow Thompson – (redshirt) Junior; 96 Justin Young – (redshirt) Freshman; 99 Vinston Painter – Freshman; Defensive End: Russell Becker – (redshirt) Freshman; Chad Carlson – (redshirt) Junior; George George – Freshman; Joe Jones – Freshman; Phil Sayre – Freshman; 6 Jason Worilds – (redshirt) Sophomore; 47 Nekos Brown – Junior; 51 Bruce Taylor – Freshman; 55 Isaiah Hamlette – Freshman; 82 Steven Friday – (redshirt) Sophomore; 90 Orion Martin – (redshirt) Senior; 92 Khalil Latif – (redshirt) Freshman	Cornerback: 3 Nobel Iyebote – (redshirt) Freshman; 1 Victor Harris – Senior; 9 Cris Hill – (redshirt) Freshman; 15 Eddie Whitley – Freshman; 21 Rashad Carmichael – (redshirt) Sophomore; 22 Stephan Virgil – Junior; 37 Jacob Sykes – (redshirt) Freshman; 28 Alonzo Tweedy - (redshirt) Sophomore; Linebacker: Austin Fuller – Freshman; Lyndell Gibson – Freshman; 26 Cody Grimm – (redshirt) Junior; 30 Ignatius Green – Junior; 33 Brett Warren – (redshirt) Senior; 36 Jake Johnson – Freshman; 36 Quilie Odom – Freshman; 40 Ryan Barnett – (redshirt) Freshman; 41 Cam Martin – (redshirt) Junior; 45 Purnell Sturdivant – (redshirt) Senior; 46 Dylan McGreevy – Senior; 49 Allen Stephens – Freshman; 52 Barquell Rivers – (redshirt) Freshman; 89 Jonas Houseright – (redshirt) Senior; 94 Mark Muncey – (redshirt) Junior; Free Safety: Ron Cooper – (redshirt) Sophomore; Scott Dalton – Freshman; Dean Hill – (redshirt) Freshman; 14 Lorenzo Williams – Freshman; 17 Kam Chancellor – Junior; Rover: Alonzo Tweedy – Freshman; 2 Davon Morgan – Sophomore; 23 Matt Reidy – (redshirt) Junior; 24 Dorian Porch – (redshirt) Junior; 43 Jeron Gouveia-Winslow – Freshman; Snapper: 50 Collin Carroll – (redshirt) Freshman; 57 Jon Conlon – (redshirt) Freshman; 63 Matt Tuttle – (redshirt) Junior; 71 Jacob Gardner – Senior; Punter: 30 Brian Saunders – (redshirt) Sophomore; 97 Brent Bowden – (redshirt) Junior; Place Kicker: Scott Demler – Freshman; Chris Hazley – (redshirt) Sophomore; Matt Waldron – (redshirt) Sophomore; 28 Tim Pisano – (redshirt) Freshman; 29 Dustin Keys – (redshirt) Senior; 48 Justin Myer – Freshman
Source: http://www.hokiesports.com/football/players

== Coaching staff ==
Position	Name	First year at VT	First year in current position
Head coach	Frank Beamer	1987	1987
Associate head coach and running backs coach	Billy Hite	1978	2001
Offensive coordinator and tight ends	Bryan Stinespring	1990	2006 (offensive coordinator since 2002)
Defensive coordinator and inside linebackers	Bud Foster	1987	1995
Offensive Line	Curt Newsome	2006	2006
Wide Receivers	Kevin Sherman	2006	2006
Strong Safety, Outside Linebackers, and Recruiting Coordinator	Jim Cavanaugh	1996	2002
Quarterbacks	Mike O'Cain	2006	2006
Defensive backs	Torrian Gray	2006	2006
Defensive Line	Charley Wiles	1996	1996
Source: http://www.hokiesports.com/football/players/

== Preseason ==
During the 2007 college football season, Virginia Tech accumulated an 11–3 record that ended with a 21–24 loss to the Kansas Jayhawks in the 2008 Orange Bowl. The Hokies also won the 2007 ACC football championship, but were not predicted to repeat that success in 2008. In the annual preseason football poll of media covering ACC football, Tech was picked second in the conference, behind the Clemson Tigers. The Hokies were picked to finish first in the ACC's Coastal Division, but lose to Clemson in the ACC Championship Game.

The reason for that second-place prediction was the loss of several key players from Tech's ACC-champion 2007 team. Virginia Tech lost its top four receivers, its leading rusher, and seven starters from a defense that ranked fourth nationally in total defense. Eight players from the 2007 team were taken in the 2008 NFL draft, and Tech's 2008 team featured just 10 players who started during the previous season. Making matters more difficult for Virginia Tech, the Hokies suffered several preseason injuries and multiple players were kicked off the team for disciplinary reasons.

On August 26, Tech head coach Frank Beamer announced his intention to redshirt backup quarterback Tyrod Taylor, keeping him in reserve for the 2008 season. Following Virginia Tech's loss to East Carolina in the first game of the season, however, Beamer removed the redshirt and Taylor played in Tech's second game in the season. After he proved successful in that game, Taylor was named the team's starting quarterback for the remainder of the season, supplanting first-game starter Sean Glennon.

== Game summaries ==
=== East Carolina ===
	1	2	3	4	Total
Hokies	0	14	2	6	22
Pirates	0	7	6	14	27

The Virginia Tech Hokies' first game of the season also was its first loss of the season. In a neutral-site game at Bank of America Stadium in Charlotte, North Carolina, Tech was upset 27–22 by the East Carolina Pirates. East Carolina, members of Conference USA, became the first team from that conference to win a game against a Bowl Championship Series member school since 2002.

The game got off to a slow start, as neither team scored in the first quarter. With 12:19 remaining before halftime, however, Virginia Tech scored the first points of the game with a 30-yard fumble return by defender Ryan Barnett #40 FR. out of Sulphur, Louisiana. Four minutes later, Virginia Tech's offense also scored, extending the Hokies' lead to 14–0. East Carolina answered with a touchdown before halftime, but Virginia Tech led 14–7 at the beginning of the second half.

The Pirates' offense scored another touchdown with 10:05 remaining in the third quarter, but the extra point kick was blocked and returned for a defensive score by Tech's Stephan Virgil. If the extra point had been successful, the teams would have been tied at 14 points apiece. Instead, Virginia Tech kept a 16–13 lead, which it retained through the third quarter. Early in the fourth quarter, Tech's offense extended the Hokies' lead to 22–13 with a touchdown. The extra point kick was missed. Both teams were held scoreless for the next ten minutes before East Carolina's Patrick Pinkney ran three yards for a touchdown. The score and extra point cut the Hokies' lead to 22–20 with less than four minutes remaining in the game. Tech attempted to run out the clock, but East Carolina's defense forced the Hokies to punt. The kick was blocked, however, and East Carolina's T.J. Lee returned the loose ball for a game-winning touchdown. With the limited time remaining in the game, Tech was unable to answer the touchdown, and East Carolina clinched a 27–22 victory.

=== Furman ===
	1	2	3	4	Total
Paladins	0	0	0	7	7
Hokies	0	3	21	0	24

Virginia Tech's second game of the season came against the Football Championship Subdivision (formerly Division I-AA) Furman Paladins at Virginia Tech's home stadium, Lane Stadium, in Blacksburg, Virginia. Despite the loss to East Carolina, Tech came into its home opener heavily favored and lived up to that expectation by beating the Paladins, 24–7. For the game, Virginia Tech wore a throwback uniform honoring former Tech coaches Jerry Claiborne, Charlie Coffey, Jimmy Sharpe and Bill Dooley.

The Hokies used backup quarterback Tyrod Taylor alongside starter Sean Glennon beginning with the fifth play of the game. Despite that change in offensive strategy, the Hokies were held scoreless in the first quarter. Tech's defense also held firm, and kept Furman from scoring in the first quarter as well. In the second quarter, both teams were again held scoreless until just 29 seconds before halftime, when Virginia Tech placekicker Dustin Keys kicked a field goal for the Hokies, giving them a 3–0 lead at halftime.

In the third quarter, Virginia Tech's offense finally hit its stride. With 8:41 remaining in the quarter, Sean Glennon completed a 10-yard touchdown pass to running back Kenny Lewis Jr., giving the Hokies a 10–0 lead after the extra point. Tech added two more touchdowns before the end of the quarter, making the game 24–0 with one quarter remaining. The Paladins scored a touchdown in the fourth quarter, closing the gap to 24–7 and avoiding a shutout, but were unable to further catch up to the Hokies. Tech earned its first win of the season, bringing its overall season record to 1–1.

=== Georgia Tech ===
	1	2	3	4	Total
Yellow Jackets	3	0	6	8	17
Hokies	0	14	0	6	20

The Hokies' third game of the season also was their first Atlantic Coast Conference game of the season as Virginia Tech faced Georgia Tech at Lane Stadium. Tyrod Taylor, who had been the Hokies' backup quarterback at the beginning of the season, started the game and did not relinquish his position. Tech fell behind 3–0 in the first quarter, but took a lead in the second quarter that they did not relinquish through the rest of the game, winning 20–17.

In the game's first quarter, Virginia Tech was held scoreless while Georgia Tech took a 3–0 lead with a 32-yard field goal by kicker Scott Blair. Early in the second quarter, Tech answered the score by taking the lead with an eight-yard touchdown run by freshman tailback Darren Evans, who finished the game with 19 carries for 94 yards and the lone touchdown. Georgia Tech answered with a touchdown that came from a 41-yard pass to Roddy Jones. The extra point was blocked, but the Yellow Jackets still held a 9–7 lead with 3:44 remaining in the first half. Virginia Tech's offense answered quickly, however, mounting a drive that resulted in a Tyrod Taylor rushing touchdown with just 10 seconds before halftime.

The Hokies entered the second half with a 14–9 lead and maintained that margin through the third quarter. Early in the fourth quarter, Tech extended its lead to 17–9 with a field goal by Dustin Keys. Four minutes of game time later, Georgia Tech's Josh Nesbitt ran 18 yards for a touchdown. Instead of kicking an extra point, the Yellow Jackets attempted a two-point conversion and were successful, tying the game at 17–17 with 9:28 remaining. From that point, both teams' defenses dominated the course of play, and only Virginia Tech, with a 21-yard field goal from Keys, was able to score. That field goal was the margin of victory, and the Hokies edged the Yellow Jackets, 20–17.

=== North Carolina ===
	1	2	3	4	Total
Hokies	0	3	7	10	20
Tar Heels	0	10	7	0	17

=== Nebraska ===
	1	2	3	4	Total
Hokies	9	9	10	7	35
Cornhuskers	7	3	7	13	30

=== Western Kentucky ===
	1	2	3	4	Total
Hilltoppers	0	3	3	7	13
Hokies	10	10	7	0	27

=== Boston College ===
	1	2	3	4	Total
Hokies	10	7	3	3	23
Eagles	7	21	0	0	28

=== Florida State ===
	1	2	3	4	Total
Hokies	10	3	0	7	20
#24 Seminoles	0	10	14	6	30

=== Maryland ===
	1	2	3	4	Total
Terrapins	0	3	10	0	13
Hokies	7	10	3	3	23

=== Miami ===
	1	2	3	4	Total
Hokies	0	7	0	7	14
Hurricanes	7	0	6	3	16

=== Duke ===
	1	2	3	4	Total
Blue Devils	0	3	0	0	3
Hokies	0	7	0	7	14

=== Virginia ===
	1	2	3	4	Total
Cavaliers	7	7	0	0	14
Hokies	7	0	7	3	17

=== ACC Championship Game vs. Boston College ===
	1	2	3	4	Total
Eagles	0	7	0	5	12
Hokies	7	7	10	6	30

=== Orange Bowl vs. Cincinnati ===
	1	2	3	4	Total
Cincinnati	7	0	0	0	7
Hokies	0	10	3	7	20

== Rankings ==
Ranking movements Legend: ██ Increase in ranking ██ Decrease in ranking — = Not ranked
	Week															
Poll	Pre	1	2	3	4	5	6	7	8	9	10	11	12	13	14	Final
AP	17	—	—	—	—	20	18	17	—	—	—	—	—	—	21	15
Coaches	15	—	—	—	—	24	18	18	—	—	—	—	—	—	19	14
Harris	Not released					22	18	17	—	—	—	—	—	—	22	Not released
BCS	Not released								—	—	—	—	—	25	19	Not released

== Statistics ==
=== Team ===
	Team	Opp
Scoring	66	51
Points per game	22.0	17.0
First downs	43	51
Rushing	29	26
Passing	11	24
Penalty	3	1
Total offense	819	1003
Avg per play	4.6	5.5
Avg per game	273.0	334.3
Fumbles-Lost	2-0	9–5
Penalties-Yards	13-75	19–153
Avg per game	25.0	51.0

	Team	Opp
Punts-Yards	15-584	12-524
Avg per punt	38.9	43.7
Time of possession/Game	29:58	30:02
3rd down conversions	17/41	17/36
4th down conversions	0/3	0/4
Touchdowns scored	8	7
Field Goal-Attempts	3-4	1–3
PAT-Attempts	7-8	4–8
Attendance	132,466	0
Games/Avg per Game	66,233	0

=== Offense ===
==== Rushing ====
Name	GP-GS	Att	Yards	Avg	TD	Long	Avg/G
Darren Evans	3-0	203	926	4.6	9	50	84.2
Tyrod Taylor	7-4	105	524	5.0	4	50	61.6
Kenny Lewis	3-3	57	199	3.5	3	24	39.8
Jahre Cheeseman	2-0	4	21	5.2	0	12	10.5
Dustin Pickle	3-0	4	18	4.5	0	8	6.0
Josh Oglesby	2-0	4	7	1.8	0	5	3.5
Greg Boone	3-3	3	4	1.3	0	3	1.3
Sean Glennon	2-2	9	2	0.2	0	8	1.0
Kenny Jefferson	3-0	1	2	2.0	0	2	0.7
Total	3	129	564	4.4	6	50	188.0
Opponents	3	111	470	4.2	3	36	156.7

==== Passing ====
Name	GP-GS	Com	Att	Yds	TD	INT	Pct	Eff	Long	Avg/G
Sean Glennon	4-8	62	99	704	3	4	62.6	124.28	62	65.6
Tyrod Taylor	2-1	63	114	675	1	5	5.3	99.12	40	92.5
Total	3	30	51	255	1	3	58.8	95.5	60	85.0
Opponents	3	47	71	533	3	2	63.4	134.7	41	177.7

==== Receiving ====
Name	GP-GS	Rec	Yds	Avg	TD	Long	Avg/G
Dyrell Roberts	3-2	11	171	15.5	0	62	15.5
Kenny Lewis	3-3	6	30	5.0	1	19	10.0
Danny Coale	3-3	27	286	10.6	0	28	10.0
Greg Boone	3-3	16	205	12.8	2	27	18.6
Andre Smith	3-1	10	129	12.9	1	40	11.7
Ike Whitaker	Suspended						
Chris Drager	3-1	3	37	12.3	0	15	3.4
Xavier Boyce	3-0	1	7	7.0	0	7	2.3
Darren Evans	3-0	11	83	7.5	0	14	7.5
Jarrett Boykin	3-0	21	342	3.0	1	41	1.0
Victor Harris	2-2	8	63	7.9	0	16	5.1
Dustin Pickle	3-0	3	16	5.3	0	11	1.5
Total	3	30	255	8.5	1	62	85.0
Opponents	3	45	533	11.8	3	41	177.7

=== Defense ===
Name	GP/GS	Tackles				Sacks		Interceptions			Fumbles		Blkd Kick
Name	GP/GS	Total	Solo	Asst	TFL	No	Yds	No	Yds	TD	Rcv-Yds	FF	Blkd Kick
Brett Warren	3-3	26	8	18	.5							1	
Purnell Sturdivant	3-3	24	6	18	1.0	1.0	2						
Cam Martin	3-2	18	11	7	1.5	1.0	6					1	
Kam Chancellor	3-3	15	6	9							1-0	1	
Stephen Virgil	3-3	15	8	7	2.0			1	18		1-30		
Cody Grimm	3-1	12	7	5	1.0			1	10			1	
Jason Worilds	3-2	10	5	5	.5								
Orion Martin	3-3	10	4	6	4.0	1.0	3						
Davon Morgan	3-3	10	5	5									
Nekos Brown	3-1	8	2	6	.5								
Steven Friday	3-0	6	2	4									
Victor Harris	2-2	6	0	6				6		2	1-0		
Demetrius Taylor	3-0	5	1	4	.5						1-0		
Barquell Rivers	3-0	5	2	3									
Cordarrow Thompson	3-3	5	1	4	.5								
Dorian Porch	3-0	5	3	2									
John Graves	3-3	2	1	1	1.0								3
Total	3	210	96	114	13.0	3	11	2	28	0	5-30	4	3

=== Special teams ===
Name	Field goals				Punting					Kickoffs			
Name	FGM	FGA	Pct	Long	No.	Yds	Avg	Long	I20	No.	Yds	Avg	TB
Dustin Keys	3	4	75.0	25									
Brent Bowden					14	584	41.7	55	4				
Justin Myer										10	667	66.7	4
Tim Pisano										4	232	58.0	0
Total	3	4	75.0	25	14	584	41.7	55	4	14	899	64.2	4

Name	Kick returns					Punt returns				
Name	No.	Yds	Avg	TD	Long	No.	Yds	Avg	TD	Long
Kenny Lewis	4	81	20.2	0	35					
Davon Morgan	2	40	20.0	0	29					
Chris Drager	1	6	6.0	0	6					
Macho Harris						4	30	7.5	0	16
Total	7	127	18.1	0	35	4	30	7.5	16	
