= 2008 Georgia Tech Yellow Jackets football team =

American college football season

2008 Georgia Tech Yellow Jackets football

ACC Coastal Division co-champion

Chick-fil-A Bowl, L 3-38 vs. LSU
- Conference: Atlantic Coast Conference
- Coastal

Ranking
- Coaches: No. 22
- AP: No. 22
- Record: 9–4 (5–3 ACC)
- Head coach: Paul Johnson (1st season)
- Offensive scheme: Flexbone triple option
- Defensive coordinator: Dave Wommack (1st season)
- Base defense: 4–3
- Home stadium: Bobby Dodd Stadium (Capacity: 55,000)

2008 Atlantic Coast Conference football standings
	Conf.			Overall
Team	W		L	W		L
Atlantic Division
Boston College xy	5	–	3	9	–	5
No. 21 Florida State x	5	–	3	9	–	4
Maryland	4	–	4	8	–	5
Wake Forest	4	–	4	8	–	5
Clemson	4	–	4	7	–	6
NC State	4	–	4	6	–	7
Coastal Division
No. 15 Virginia Tech xy$	5	–	3	10	–	4
No. 22 Georgia Tech x	5	–	3	9	–	4
North Carolina	0	–	4	0	–	5
Miami (FL)	4	–	4	7	–	6
Virginia	3	–	5	5	–	7
Duke	1	–	7	4	–	8
Championship: Virginia Tech 30, Boston College 12
$ – BCS representative as conference champion; x – Division champion/co-champions; y – Championship game participant; North Carolina vacated 8 wins, including 4 ACC wins; Rankings from AP Poll

The 2008 Georgia Tech Yellow Jackets football team represented the Georgia Institute of Technology in the 2008 NCAA Division I FBS football season. The team's coach is former Navy Midshipmen and Georgia Southern Eagles coach Paul Johnson. Georgia Tech plays their home games at Bobby Dodd Stadium in Atlanta, Georgia.

== Preseason ==
Paul Johnson is the new head coach of the Yellow Jackets after posting a 45–29 record at the United States Naval Academy since 2002. Johnson also recorded a 7–1 record in the Commander-in-Chief's Trophy against the Air Force and Army.

Johnson will be installing his option offense at Georgia Tech. In response, 2007 starting QB Taylor Bennett transferred to Louisiana Tech, opening up the 2008 QB job for sophomore Josh Nesbitt and freshman Jaybo Shaw. The Georgia Tech offense returns two of its top four receivers in Greg Smith and Demaryius Thomas, and the Tech defense returns defensive end Michael Johnson and primary interior linemen Darryl Richard and Vance Walker.

In June 2008, former University of Louisville RB Anthony Allen announced he will be transferring to Georgia Tech. Due to NCAA transfer rules, he will be required to sit out the 2008 football season.

== Rankings ==
Ranking movements Legend: ██ Increase in ranking ██ Decrease in ranking — = Not ranked RV = Received votes
	Week																
Poll	Pre	1	2	3	4	5	6	7	8	9	10	11	12	13	14	15	Final
AP	—	—	—	—	—	RV	RV	RV	21	RV	22	RV	RV	18	15	14	22
Coaches	—	—	—	—	—	RV	RV	RV	RV	RV	20	RV	RV	23	16	15	22
Harris	Not released					RV	RV	RV	22	25	20	RV	RV	22	16	14	Not released
BCS	Not released								18	—	20	—	—	22	15	14	Not released

== Schedule ==
Date	Time	Opponent	Rank	Site	TV	Result	Attendance
August 28	7:30 p.m.	Jacksonville State*		Bobby Dodd Stadium; Atlanta, GA	ESPN360	W 41–14	45,706
September 6	12:00 p.m.	at Boston College		Alumni Stadium; Chestnut Hill, MA	Raycom	W 19–16	40,106
September 13	3:30 p.m.	at Virginia Tech		Lane Stadium; Blacksburg, VA	ABC	L 17–20	66,233
September 20	12:00 p.m.	Mississippi State*		Bobby Dodd Stadium; Atlanta, GA	Raycom	W 38–7	48,402
October 4	12:00 p.m.	Duke		Bobby Dodd Stadium; Atlanta, GA	ESPNU	W 27–0	46,104
October 11	3:30 p.m.	Gardner–Webb*		Bobby Dodd Stadium; Atlanta, GA		W 10–7	41,929
October 18	12:00 p.m.	at Clemson		Memorial Stadium; Clemson, SC	ESPN	W 21–17	81,500
October 25	3:30 p.m.	Virginia^{†}	No. 21	Bobby Dodd Stadium; Atlanta, GA	ESPNU	L 17–24	47,416
November 1	3:30 p.m.	No. 16 Florida State		Bobby Dodd Stadium; Atlanta, GA	ABC	W 31–28	53,528
November 8	12:00 p.m.	at No. 19 North Carolina	No. 22	Kenan Memorial Stadium; Chapel Hill, NC	Raycom	L 7–28	59,000
November 20	7:30 p.m.	No. 23 Miami (FL)		Bobby Dodd Stadium; Atlanta, GA	ESPN	W 41–23	49,335
November 29	12:00 p.m.	at No. 13 Georgia*	No. 18	Sanford Stadium; Athens, GA (Clean, Old-Fashioned Hate)	CBS	W 45–42	92,746
December 31	7:30 p.m.	vs. LSU*	No. 14	Georgia Dome; Atlanta, GA (Chick-fil-A Bowl)	ESPN	L 3–38	71,423
*Non-conference game; ^{†}Homecoming; Rankings from AP Poll released prior to the game; All times are in Eastern time

== Personnel ==
2008 Georgia Tech Yellow Jackets football team roster
Players
Coaches
Offense

Pos.	#	Name	Class
RB	3	Marcus Wright	Fr
RB	5	Greg Smith	Jr
QB	6	Jim Henry	Fr
QB	7	Doc Coppage	Fr
WR	8	Demaryius Thomas	So
QB	9	Josh Nesbitt	So
QB	11	Jaybo Shaw	Fr
QB	13	Tevin Washington	Fr
WR	15	Correy Earls	So
QB	16	Bryce Dykes	Fr
QB	18	Calvin Booker	Sr
RB	20	Roddy Jones	Fr
FB	21	Jonathan Dwyer	So
WR	23	Quinton Sims	Fr
WR	24	Embry Peeples	Fr
WR	27	Jonathan Malone	So
FB	35	Lance Walls	Jr
RB	36	Lucas Cox	So
FB	38	Quincy Kelly	So
RB	39	Josh Wallace	Fr
RB	43	Tyler Evans	Jr
RB	45	Jason Davis	Jr
FB	46	Matt Kamp	Jr
FB	48	Richard Watson	Fr
FB	49	Trevor Bray	So
OL	53	A. J. Smith	Sr
OL	55	David Brown	Sr
OL	60	Brad Sellers	Jr
OL	61	Phil Smith	Fr
OL	62	Omoregie Uzzi	Fr
OL	63	Chase Hudson	Fr
OL	64	Andrew Gardner	Sr
OL	65	Andrew Folkner	Sr
OL	66	Michael St. Denis	Fr
OL	68	Drew Brannon	So
OL	69	Alex Paquette	Jr
OL	70	Joseph Gilbert	Fr
OL	71	Cord Howard	Jr
OL	72	Jason Hill	Jr
OL	75	Nick Claytor	Fr
OL	76	Nick McRae	Fr
OL	76	Jeff Lentz	So
OL	77	Dan Voss	So
OL	78	Clyde Yandell	Fr
OL	79	Zach Krish	So
WR	80	Daniel McKayhan	Fr
WR	81	Zach Fisher	Fr
RB	83	Andrew Smith	Sr
WR	84	Tyler Melton	Fr
WR	85	Austin Barrick	So
WR	86	R. B. Clyburn	Fr
WR	88	Kevin Cone	So
WR	89	Paul Reese	Fr

Defense

Pos.	#	Name	Class
DB	1	Morgan Burnett	So
DB	2	Mario Butler	Fr
DB	4	Brandon Leslie	Fr
DB	5	Alex Walker	Fr
DB	6	Willie White	Fr
LB	7	Tony Clark	Sr
DB	10	Martin Frierson	Jr
LB	12	Anthony Barnes	So
DB	16	Tyler Barrett	Sr
LB	17	Matt Braman	Sr
DB	25	DeRon Jasper	So
DB	26	Dominique Reese	So
DB	28	Rashaad Reid	Fr
DB	29	Jon Lockhart	Fr
LB	30	James Liipfert	Sr
DB	32	Jahi Word-Daniels	Sr
LB	34	Steven Sylvester	Fr
DB	35	Michael Peterson	Fr
DB	37	Jerrad Tarrant	Fr
DB	39	Cooper Taylor	Fr
DB	40	Kamaron Riley	Fr
DL	41	Anthony Egbuniwe	So
LB	42	Malcolm Munroe	Fr
LB	44	Albert Rocker	Fr
DB	47	Jake Blackwood	Jr
LB	51	Brad Jefferson	So
LB	54	Sedric Griffin	Jr
LB	56	Osahon Tongo	So
LB	57	Shane Bowen	Jr
LB	58	B. J. Machen	Fr
LB	59	Kyle Jackson	Fr
DL	66	Luke Snider	So
LB	67	Steven Powers	So
DL	79	Sean Bedford	So
DL	88	Antonio Wilson	Fr
DL	90	T. J. Barnes	Fr
DL	91	Derrick Morgan	So
DL	92	Jason Peters	Fr
DL	93	Michael Johnson	Sr
DL	94	Elris Anyaibe	Sr
DL	95	Darryl Richard	Sr
DL	96	Logan Walls	Fr
DL	97	Robert Hall	Jr
DL	98	Ben Anderson	So
DL	99	Vance Walker	Sr

Special teams

Pos.	#	Name	Class
K	14	Scott Blair	So
K	24	Chandler Anderson	Fr
P	31	Mohamed Yahiaoui	Sr
K	33	Troy Garside	Sr
LS	50	Brett White	Sr
LS	52	Levi Walls	Sr
LS	54	Michael Ray	Jr
P	82	Kevin Crosby	So
K	86	Tyler Davis	Sr

Head coach

- Paul Johnson
  Head coach/Offensive coordinator

Coordinators/assistant coaches

- Brian Bohannon
  Quarterbacks/b-backs
- Jeff Monken
  A-backs/special teams
- Al Preston
  Wide receivers
- Todd Spencer
  Co-offensive line
- Mike Sewak
  Co-offensive line
- Dave Wommack
  Defensive coordinator
- Giff Smith
  Defensive line/recruiting coordinator
- Brian Jean–Mary
  Linebackers
- Charles Kelly
  Cornerbacks

Legend

- (C) Team captain
- (S) Suspended
- (I) Ineligible
- Injured
- Redshirt

== Game summaries ==
=== Jacksonville State ===
Jacksonville State Gamecocks at Georgia Tech Yellow Jackets – Game summary

Quarter	1	2	3	4	Total
Gamecocks	0	0	7	7	14
Yellow Jackets	14	13	7	7	41

at Bobby Dodd Stadium, Atlanta, Georgia

- Date: August 28
- Game time: 7:30 p.m. EDT
- Game weather: Clear, 84 °F (29 °C)
- Game attendance: 45,706
- Referee: Brad Allen
- TV: ESPN360
- Box score, Recap

Game information
First quarter
- GT – Jonathan Dwyer 21-yard run (Scott Blair kick), 5:45. Yellow Jackets 7–0. Drive: 3 plays, 27 yards, 1:33.
- GT – Josh Nesbitt 2-yard run (Scott Blair kick), 2:30. Yellow Jackets 14–0. Drive: 4 plays, 68 yards, 1:34.

Second quarter

- GT – Josh Nesbitt 1-yard run (Scott Blair kick), 13:08. Yellow Jackets 21–0. Drive: 6 plays, 65 yards, 2:57.
- GT – Jonathan Dwyer 29-yard run (kick failed), 2:32. Yellow Jackets 27–0. Drive: 4 plays, 61 yards, 1:23.

Third quarter

- JVST – Maurice Dupree 5-yard pass from Ryan Perrilloux (Gavin Halford kick), 12:53. Yellow Jackets 27–7. Drive: 7 plays, 33 yards, 2:04.
- GT – Roddy Jones 49-yard run (Scott Blair kick), 10:36. Yellow Jackets 34–7. Drive: 6 plays, 76 yards, 2:17.

Fourth quarter

- GT – Jaybo Shaw 2-yard run (Scott Blair kick), 11:50. Yellow Jackets 41–7. Drive: 3 plays, 44 yards, 1:28.
- JVST – Maurice Dupree 16-yard pass from Ryan Perrilloux (Gavin Halford kick), 0:37. Yellow Jackets 41–14. Drive: 12 plays, 64 yards, 5:43.

Statistics	JVST	GT
First downs	15	19
Total yards	258	484
Rushing yards	122	349
Passing yards	136	140
Turnovers	4	2
Time of possession	30:17	29:43

Team	Category	Player	Statistics
Jacksonville State	Passing	Ryan Perrilloux	22/37, 136 yards, 2 TD, 2 INT
Jacksonville State	Rushing	Ryan Perrilloux	18 rushes, 67 yards
Jacksonville State	Receiving	Maurice Dupree	9 receptions, 39 yards, 2 TD
Georgia Tech	Passing	Joshua Nesbitt	5/12, 87 yards
Georgia Tech	Rushing	Jonathan Dwyer	11 rushes, 112 yards, 2 TD
Georgia Tech	Receiving	Roddy Jones	2 receptions, 50 yards

Georgia Tech ran for 349 yards in the season opener against Jacksonville State. The team was led by Jon Dwyer's 113 yards rushing and pair of touchdown runs. Josh Nesbitt scored two additional rushing touchdowns in the rout. The game featured former Louisiana State University quarterback Ryan Perrilloux who transferred to Jacksonville State after the 2007 football season. Perrilloux led the Gamecocks on their two second-half touchdown drives, but was intercepted twice by Tech safety Morgan Burnett. The Tech defense also added four sacks in the effort. Tech has not lost to an I-AA opponent since its September 17, 1983, game against the Furman Paladins.

=== At Boston College ===
Georgia Tech Yellow Jackets at Boston College Eagles – Game summary

Quarter	1	2	3	4	Total
Yellow Jackets	7	0	3	9	19
Eagles	3	6	7	0	16

at Alumni Stadium, Chestnut Hill, Massachusetts

- Date: September 6
- Game time: 12:00 p.m. EDT
- Game attendance: 40,106
- TV announcers (Raycom): Steve Martin, Rick Walker, & Mike Hogewood
- Box score, Recap

Game information
First quarter
- BC – Steve Aponavicius 36-yard field goal, 9:07. Eagles 3–0. Drive: 12 plays, 46 yards, 4:09.
- GT – Josh Nesbitt 1-yard run (Scott Blair kick), 3:46. Yellow Jackets 7–3. Drive: 11 plays, 74 yards, 5:12.

Second quarter

- BC – Steve Aponavicius 34-yard field goal, 11:54. Yellow Jackets 7–6. Drive: 4 plays, 6 yards, 1:33.
- BC – Steve Aponavicius 26-yard field goal, 6:18. Eagles 9–7. Drive: 11 plays, 50 yards, 4:29.

Third quarter

- GT – Scott Blair 27-yard field goal, 9:57. Yellow Jackets 10–9. Drive: 7 plays, 22 yards, 5:03.
- BC – Ifeanyi Momah 7-yard pass from Chris Crane (Steve Aponavicius kick), 3:03. Eagles 16–10. Drive: 10 plays, 69 yards, 3:58.

Fourth quarter

- GT – Vance Walker safety, 10:24. Eagles 16–12.
- GT – Jonathan Dwyer 43-yard run (Scott Blair kick), 8:26. Yellow Jackets 19–16. Drive: 4 plays, 54 yards, 1:58.

Statistics	GT	BC
First downs	12	18
Total yards	235	262
Rushing yards	162	120
Passing yards	89	142
Turnovers	3	3
Time of possession	27:15	32:45

Team	Category	Player	Statistics
Georgia Tech	Passing	Josh Nesbitt	6/13, 73 yards
Georgia Tech	Rushing	Jonathan Dwyer	18 rushes, 108 yards, TD
Georgia Tech	Receiving	Demaryius Thomas	4 receptions, 56 yards
Boston College	Passing	Chris Crane	18/35, 142 yards, TD, 2 INT
Boston College	Rushing	Josh Haden	8 rushes, 35 yards
Boston College	Receiving	Ryan Purvis	3 receptions, 38 yards

Georgia Tech overcame a fourth quarter deficit and three lost fumbles to defeat the Boston College Eagles 19–16. The Jackets were led by the running of sophomores Jon Dwyer and Josh Nesbitt. The two combined for all but 8 yards of Georgia Tech's 235 yards of offense. Dwyer added 93 yards of kick returns to his 109 yards rushing. Dwyer scored the go ahead touchdown on a 43-yard run with less than 9 minutes remaining in the game. Georgia Tech's defense sacked first year starter Chris Crane three times in the game and forced three turnovers. Tech remained undefeated all time in Chestnut Hill with the win.

=== At Virginia Tech ===
Georgia Tech Yellow Jackets at Virginia Tech Hokies – Game summary

Quarter	1	2	3	4	Total
Yellow Jackets	3	0	6	8	17
Hokies	0	14	0	6	20

at Lane Stadium, Blacksburg, Virginia

- Date: September 13
- Game time: 3:30 p.m. EDT
- Game attendance: 66,233
- TV announcers (ABC/ESPN2): Dave LaMont, David Norrie, & Todd Harris

Statistics	GT	VT
First downs		
Total yards		
Rushing yards		
Passing yards		
Turnovers		
Time of possession		

Team	Category	Player	Statistics
Georgia Tech	Passing		
Georgia Tech	Rushing		
Georgia Tech	Receiving		
Virginia Tech	Passing		
Virginia Tech	Rushing		
Virginia Tech	Receiving		

The Hokies needed a penalty-aided, fourth quarter drive to put away the Jackets in 20–17 loss for Georgia Tech, the first loss of the season for GT. On Virginia Tech's second to last possession, the Hokies only managed 38 yards of offense but with key defensive penalties moved the ball 76 yards to the Georgia Tech 4 yard line and kicked the go ahead field goal with 4:37 remaining on the game clock. Georgia Tech rushed for 278 yards in the game, led by quarterback Josh Nesbitt's 151 yards and slotback Lucas Cox's 63 yards. Nesbitt also added 109 yards passing with a 41-yard touchdown strike to slotback Roddy Jones followed by a two-point conversion. The Tech defense held VT to only 48 yards passing but gave up 200 yards on the ground. Safety Morgan Burnett added 13 tackles to his total for the season increasing his average to 9 tackles per game for the season. Michael Johnson and Derrick Morgan combined for Tech's lone sack on Virginia Tech QB Tyrod Taylor. ABC took a 6-day option on the time of the Mississippi State gametime and with the loss relegated Tech's home game to a 12:00 pm EST time slot the following week.

=== Mississippi State ===
Mississippi State Bulldogs at Georgia Tech Yellow Jackets – Game summary

Quarter	1	2	3	4	Total
Bulldogs	0	0	0	7	7
Yellow Jackets	14	7	10	7	38

at Bobby Dodd Stadium, Atlanta, Georgia

- Date: September 20
- Game time: 12:00 p.m. EDT
- Game attendance: 48,402
- TV announcers (Raycom): Steve Martin, Rick Walker, & Mike Hogewood

Statistics	MSST	GT
First downs		
Total yards		
Rushing yards		
Passing yards		
Turnovers		
Time of possession		

Team	Category	Player	Statistics
Mississippi State	Passing		
Mississippi State	Rushing		
Mississippi State	Receiving		
Georgia Tech	Passing		
Georgia Tech	Rushing		
Georgia Tech	Receiving		

Georgia Tech scored 38 straight points against the Mississippi State Bulldogs to cruise to a 38–7 victory at home. The offense was led by the rushing effort of Jon Dwyer who accumulated 141 yards, a rushing touchdown, and a school record 88 yard touchdown run in the third quarter. True freshman Jaybo Shaw substituted for injured quarterback Josh Nesbitt in the first quarter and would finish the game with 106 total yards, a passing touchdown, and a rushing touchdown. The Georgia Tech defense bent but did not break allowing 407 yards of offense but giving up only 7 points, the lowest point allowance of the season. The defense picked off two Mississippi State passes, recovered two fumbles, and accumulated three quarterback sacks. Michael Johnson along with his sack blocked an 18-yard field goal attempt in the first quarter. With the win, Georgia Tech has gone 6–8 against the Southeastern Conference since 2000.

=== Duke ===
Duke Blue Devils at Georgia Tech Yellow Jackets – Game summary

Quarter	1	2	3	4	Total
Blue Devils	0	0	0	0	0
Yellow Jackets	0	3	7	17	27

at Bobby Dodd Stadium, Atlanta, Georgia

- Date: October 4
- Game time: 12:00 p.m. EDT
- Game attendance: 46,104
- TV announcers (ESPNU): Dave Armstrong & Larry Coker

Statistics	DUKE	GT
First downs		
Total yards		
Rushing yards		
Passing yards		
Turnovers		
Time of possession		

Team	Category	Player	Statistics
Duke	Passing		
Duke	Rushing		
Duke	Receiving		
Georgia Tech	Passing		
Georgia Tech	Rushing		
Georgia Tech	Receiving		

Georgia Tech started true freshman Jaybo Shaw at quarterback for ailing Josh Nesbitt and rolled over Duke 27–0. Shaw passed for 230 yards and a touchdown all to one receiver sophomore Demaryius Thomas. Thomas caught one pass for a career long 88 yards. Jon Dwyer and Roddy Jones added balance to the Georgia Tech offense accumulating 203 yards on 33 carries. Jones scored Tech's lone rushing touchdown. Georgia Tech's defense held Duke's offense to 0 points and 132 yards after Duke averaged 31 points and 373 yards per game coming into the contest. Tech defenders racked up two sacks and an interception. This was the twenty-sixth shutdown since 1961 for Georgia Tech. The last shutout for a Georgia Tech defense was the 2006 North Carolina game in which Tech won 7–0 and clinched the Coastal Division seat in the ACC Championship Game.

=== Gardner–Webb ===
Gardner–Webb Runnin' Bulldogs at Georgia Tech Yellow Jackets – Game summary

Quarter	1	2	3	4	Total
Runnin' Bulldogs	0	0	7	0	7
Yellow Jackets	0	10	0	0	10

at Bobby Dodd Stadium, Atlanta, Georgia

- Date: October 11
- Game time: 3:30 p.m. EDT

Statistics	GWU	GT
First downs		
Total yards		
Rushing yards		
Passing yards		
Turnovers		
Time of possession		

Team	Category	Player	Statistics
Gardner–Webb	Passing		
Gardner–Webb	Rushing		
Gardner–Webb	Receiving		
Georgia Tech	Passing		
Georgia Tech	Rushing		
Georgia Tech	Receiving		

Gardner–Webb's attempt at the upset fell short when the game-tying field goal with 9 seconds remaining was partially blocked by sophomore defensive end Derrick Morgan. Third string redshirt senior Calvin Booker received the starting nod from Paul Johnson before the game to rest ailing quarterbacks Josh Nesbitt and Jaybo Shaw. Tech's worst offensive showing of the season saw Tech only accumulate 79 yards on the ground and give away three turnovers. The lone offensive highlight being a 79-yard touchdown reception by Jon Dwyer in the second quarter. Tech's defense held the Runnin' Bulldogs until 8:25 in the third quarter, in which the Bulldogs marched 69 yards down the field for their lone score. The Tech defense racked up 6 sacks and an interception.

=== At Clemson ===
Georgia Tech Yellow Jackets at Clemson Tigers – Game summary

Quarter	1	2	3	4	Total
Yellow Jackets	7	7	0	7	21
Tigers	0	3	14	0	17

at Memorial Stadium, Clemson, South Carolina

- Date: October 18
- Game time: 12:00 p.m. EDT
- Game attendance: 81,500
- TV announcers (ESPN): Dave Pasch & Andre Ware

Statistics	GT	CLEM
First downs		
Total yards		
Rushing yards		
Passing yards		
Turnovers		
Time of possession		

Team	Category	Player	Statistics
Georgia Tech	Passing		
Georgia Tech	Rushing		
Georgia Tech	Receiving		
Clemson	Passing		
Clemson	Rushing		
Clemson	Receiving		

On October 13, Clemson head coach Tommy Bowden was fired and was replaced by receivers coach Dabo Swinney. Tech's defense controlled the ebb and flow of the game forcing six turnovers, which included four interceptions and two fumble recoveries. Safety Dominique Reese returned an intercepted pass from wide receiver Tyler Grisham for Tech's first touchdown. Morgan Burnett added two additional interceptions, the final in the last second of the game. Offensively, Tech continued to produce with its ground game against the Tigers racking up 207 yards rushing. Josh Nesbitt ran untouched for 5 yards for Tech's second score and passed 24 yards to Demaryius Thomas for Tech's go ahead and eventual game winning score. Tech is 6–1 for the first time since 1999.

=== Virginia ===
Virginia Cavaliers at No. 21 Georgia Tech Yellow Jackets – Game summary

Quarter	1	2	3	4	Total
Cavaliers	3	7	7	7	24
No. 21 Yellow Jackets	14	0	0	3	17

at Bobby Dodd Stadium, Atlanta, Georgia

- Date: October 25
- Game time: 3:30 p.m. EDT
- Game attendance: 47,416
- TV announcers (ESPNU): Doug Bell & Charles Arbuckle

Statistics	UVA	GT
First downs		
Total yards		
Rushing yards		
Passing yards		
Turnovers		
Time of possession		

Team	Category	Player	Statistics
Virginia	Passing		
Virginia	Rushing		
Virginia	Receiving		
Georgia Tech	Passing		
Georgia Tech	Rushing		
Georgia Tech	Receiving		

Georgia Tech dropped its first homecoming decision in thirteen years ending a twelve-game win streak that dates back to 1995. The Cavaliers were aided by three Georgia Tech turnovers. The Georgia Tech defense struggled to contain the Cavaliers giving up almost 400 yards of offense and the most points allowed all season. Tech highlights, however, included two interceptions by the defense and a recovered fumble. Slotback Roddy Jones had a career day with 169 all purpose yards including 75 yards rushing on 11 carries. Tech heads into the Florida State game a half game behind Virginia and a half game ahead of Virginia Tech, Miami, and UNC in the ACC Coastal Division race.

=== No. 16 Florida State ===
No. 16 Florida State Seminoles at Georgia Tech Yellow Jackets – Game summary

Quarter	1	2	3	4	Total
No. 16 Seminoles	10	10	0	8	28
Yellow Jackets	3	21	7	0	31

at Bobby Dodd Stadium, Atlanta, Georgia

- Date: November 1
- Game time: 3:30 p.m. EDT
- Game attendance: 53,528
- TV announcers (ABC/ESPN2): Brad Nessler, Bob Griese, Paul Maguire, & Stacey Dales

Statistics	FSU	GT
First downs		
Total yards		
Rushing yards		
Passing yards		
Turnovers		
Time of possession		

Team	Category	Player	Statistics
Florida State	Passing		
Florida State	Rushing		
Florida State	Receiving		
Georgia Tech	Passing		
Georgia Tech	Rushing		
Georgia Tech	Receiving		

Georgia Tech had not defeated Florida State since 1975. The twelve-game losing streak that dated back to 1992 that included three head coaching tenures ended with a 31–28 victory for Georgia Tech. Georgia Tech appeared to have the game clearly in hand until Josh Nesbitt injured his foot with 7:42 remaining in the 3rd quarter. Backup Jaybo Shaw assumed control of the offense and the offense only managed 8 yards of offense in the remaining one and a half quarters. Florida State closed the score differential to 31–28 and drove all the way to the Georgia Tech 3 yard line with 1:20 remaining in the game. On second down, the FSU running back lost control of the football after Safety Cooper Taylor hit the ball with his helmet. Tech's Rashaad Reid recovered the football in the end zone and with two proceeding quarterback kneels ended the dramatic victory. Jon Dwyer added 145 yards rushing and two touchdowns, Roddy Jones added 118 all purpose yards, and starter Josh Nesbitt added 116 additional all purpose yards to the offensive effort. The Tech defense sacked FSU quarterbacks 5 times and forced 3 turnovers. Tech took a half-game lead in the division race with the win. Some refer to the game as the "Miracle on North Avenue," as it ended Georgia Tech's 12 meeting losing run to the Seminoles, and the first time the Yellow Jackets had ever beaten legendary Coach Bobby Bowden since he came to FSU.

=== At. No. 19 North Carolina ===
No. 22 Georgia Tech Yellow Jackets at No. 19 North Carolina Tar Heels – Game summary

Quarter	1	2	3	4	Total
No. 22 Yellow Jackets	0	0	0	7	7
No. 19 Tar Heels	7	0	0	21	28

at Kenan Memorial Stadium, Chapel Hill, North Carolina

- Date: November 8
- Game time: 12:00 p.m. EST
- Game attendance: 59,000
- TV announcers (Raycom): Steve Martin, Rick Walker, & Mike Hogewood

Statistics	GT	UNC
First downs		
Total yards		
Rushing yards		
Passing yards		
Turnovers		
Time of possession		

Team	Category	Player	Statistics
Georgia Tech	Passing		
Georgia Tech	Rushing		
Georgia Tech	Receiving		
North Carolina	Passing		
North Carolina	Rushing		
North Carolina	Receiving		

In Georgia Tech's worst offensive showing of the season Tech gave up 3 turnovers and lost 28–7 in Chapel Hill. The defense held UNC's offense in check until the fourth quarter in which a muffed punt, a fumble, and an interception led to three consecutive Tarheel touchdowns. Tech's lone offensive highlight was an 85-yard touchdown run by Jon Dwyer, which was the longest touchdown run recorded against an UNC defense ever. Dwyer's effort for the day put him over 1,000 yards for the season. Tech's defense was led by Michael Johnson who accumulated 6 tackles and sack in the losing effort.

=== No. 23 Miami (FL) ===
No. 23 Miami Hurricanes at Georgia Tech Yellow Jackets – Game summary

Quarter	1	2	3	4	Total
No. 23 Hurricanes	0	3	7	13	23
Yellow Jackets	3	21	17	0	41

at Bobby Dodd Stadium, Atlanta, Georgia

- Date: November 20
- Game time: 7:30 p.m. EST
- Game attendance: 49,335
- TV announcers (ESPN): Chris Fowler, Jesse Palmer, Craig James, & Erin Andrews

Statistics	MIA	GT
First downs		
Total yards		
Rushing yards		
Passing yards		
Turnovers		
Time of possession		

Team	Category	Player	Statistics
Miami	Passing		
Miami	Rushing		
Miami	Receiving		
Georgia Tech	Passing		
Georgia Tech	Rushing		
Georgia Tech	Receiving		

Georgia Tech has defeated Miami four consecutive years joining Alabama, Florida, Florida State, Kentucky, Notre Dame, and Virginia Tech as the only schools to defeat Miami in four consecutive years. Georgia Tech led by as much as 24 and never relented the lead over the Canes as the Tech offense racked up 472 yards rushing. The defense picked off two Miami passes including one by defensive end Michael Johnson, which was returned for the first touchdown of the game. Tech's victory put them in first place in the Coastal Division. Georgia Tech needs Virginia, Virginia Tech, and North Carolina to lose at least one more game to end all tie breaking scenarios. Also of note, the game was dubbed a "White Out" by the Georgia Tech Athletic Association and fans were encouraged to wear white to the game.

=== At No. 13 Georgia ===
No. 18 Georgia Tech Yellow Jackets at No. 13 Georgia Bulldogs – Game summary

Quarter	1	2	3	4	Total
No. 18 Yellow Jackets	6	6	26	7	45
No. 13 Bulldogs	7	21	0	14	42

at Sanford Stadium, Athens, Georgia

- Date: November 29
- Game time: 12:00 p.m. EST
- Game attendance: 92,746
- TV announcers (CBS): Craig Bolerjack & Trev Alberts
- Box score, Recap

Game information
First quarter
- UGA – Tripp Chandler 1-yard pass from Matthew Stafford (Blair Walsh kick), 11:40. Bulldogs 7–0. Drive: 8 plays, 66 yards, 3:20.
- GT – Morgan Burnett 35-yard interception return (kick failed), 2:57. Bulldogs 7–6.

Second quarter

- UGA – Mohamed Massaquoi 10-yard pass from Matthew Stafford (Blair Walsh kick), 13:36. Bulldogs 14–6. Drive: 8 plays, 75 yards, 4:21.
- GT – Lucas Cox 2-yard run (pass failed), 9:22. Bulldogs 14–12. Drive: 8 plays, 65 yards, 4:14.
- UGA – Mohamed Massaquoi 49-yard pass from Matthew Stafford (Blair Walsh kick), 7:00. Bulldogs 21–12. Drive: 5 plays, 76 yards, 2:22.
- UGA – Mohamed Massaquoi 3-yard pass from Matthew Stafford (Blair Walsh kick), 0:37. Bulldogs 28–12. Drive: 6 plays, 56 yards, 0:46.

Third quarter

- GT – Jonathan Dwyer 60-yard run (Jonathan Dwyer run), 14:48. Bulldogs 28–20. Drive: 1 play, 60 yards, 0:12.
- GT – Roddy Jones 8-yard run (Josh Nesbitt run), 8:11. Tied 28–28. Drive: 10 plays, 56 yards, 5:16.
- GT – Jonathan Dwyer 23-yard run (Scott Blair kick), 7:55. Yellow Jackets 35–28. Drive: 1 play, 23 yards, 0:06.
- GT – Scott Blair 28-yard field goal, 1:14. Yellow Jackets 38–28. Drive: 7 plays, 76 yards, 4:19.

Fourth quarter

- UGA – Knowshon Moreno 32-yard run (Blair Walsh kick), 10:23. Yellow Jackets 38–35. Drive: 4 plays, 41 yards, 1:16.
- GT – Roddy Jones 54-yard run (Scott Blair kick), 7:13. Yellow Jackets 45–35. Drive: 6 plays, 70 yards, 3:10.
- UGA – A. J. Green 12-yard pass from Matthew Stafford (Blair Walsh kick), 4:04. Yellow Jackets 45–42. Drive: 9 plays, 72 yards, 3:09.

Statistics	GT	UGA
First downs	15	22
Total yards	428	488
Rushing yards	409	81
Passing yards	19	421
Turnovers	1	2
Penalties–yards	5–35	7–64

Team	Category	Player	Statistics
Georgia Tech	Passing	Josh Nesbitt	1/6, 19 yards, INT
Georgia Tech	Rushing	Roddy Jones	13 rushes, 214 yards, 2 TD
Georgia Tech	Receiving	Demaryius Thomas	1 reception, 19 yards
Georgia	Passing	Matthew Stafford	24/39, 407 yards, 5 TD, INT
Georgia	Rushing	Knowshon Moreno	17 rushes, 94 yards, TD
Georgia	Receiving	Mohamed Massaquoi	11 receptions, 180 yards, 3 TD

On the strength of a third quarter offensive explosion, Georgia Tech bested Georgia in Athens 45–42. Tech was led by the rushing efforts of Roddy Jones and Jon Dwyer who were major contributors to Tech's 410 total rushing yards. Jones alone contributed 299 all-purpose yards in the effort. The win ended a seven-year losing streak to the Bulldogs and preserved Tech coach Bobby Dodd's series record eight-game winning streak that ran from 1949–1956.

=== Vs. LSU (Chick-fil-A Bowl) ===
LSU Tigers vs. No. 14 Georgia Tech Yellow Jackets (Chick-fil-A Bowl) – Game summary

Quarter	1	2	3	4	Total
Tigers	7	28	3	0	38
No. 14 Yellow Jackets	3	0	0	0	3

at Georgia Dome, Atlanta, Georgia

- Date: December 31
- Game time: 7:30 p.m. EST
- Game weather: None (played indoors)
- Game attendance: 71,423
- Referee: Jerry McGinn
- TV announcers (ESPN/ESPN Radio): Brad Nessler, Bob Griese, Paul Maguire, & Jack Arute/Dave Barnett, Dennis Franchione, & Dave Ryan
- Box score, Recap

Game information
First quarter
- LSU – Charles Scott 2-yard run (Colt David kick), 11:58. Tigers 7–0. Drive: 7 plays, 60 yards, 3:02.
- GT – Scott Blair 24-yard field goal, 1:03. Tigers 7–3. Drive: 13 plays, 60 yards, 7:05.

Second quarter

- LSU – Charles Scott 4-yard run (Colt David kick), 12:08. Tigers 14–3. Drive: 8 plays, 76 yards, 3:49.
- LSU – Charles Scott 1-yard run (Colt David kick), 8:27. Tigers 21–3. Drive: 6 plays, 19 yards, 2:53.
- LSU – Richard Dickson 25-yard pass from Jordan Jefferson (Colt David kick), 5:21. Tigers 28–3. Drive: 2 plays, 24 yards, 1:23.
- LSU – Keiland Williams 17-yard run (Colt David kick), 1:27. Tigers 35–3. Drive: 4 plays, 42 yards, 1:45.

Third quarter

- LSU – Colt David 53-yard field goal, 1:56. Tigers 38–3. Drive: 4 plays, -13 yards, 1:38.

Fourth quarter

- No scoring plays

Statistics	LSU	GT
First downs	19	15
Total yards	324	314
Rushing yards	161	164
Passing yards	163	150
Turnovers	0	3
Time of possession	30:41	29:19

Team	Category	Player	Statistics
LSU	Passing	Jordan Jefferson	16/25, 142 yards, TD
LSU	Rushing	Charles Scott	15 rushes, 65 yards, 3 TD
LSU	Receiving	Richard Dickson	4 receptions, 50 yards, TD
Georgia Tech	Passing	Joshua Nesbitt	8/24, 150 yards, INT
Georgia Tech	Rushing	Jonathan Dwyer	10 rushes, 67 yards
Georgia Tech	Receiving	Jonathan Dwyer	3 receptions, 66 yards

A 28-point 2nd quarter by LSU was too much for the Jackets to overcome in the 2008 Chick-fil-A Bowl rout. Tech gave up three turnovers and did not force any. Tech passed 24 times in the game and accumulated 150 yards of passing offense alongside 164 yards of rushing offense. Tech's offense was led by Jon Dwyer's 123 all purpose yards. Tech's defense was led by Morgan Burnett. Burnett had 14 total tackles and 1.5 tackles for loss. Senior Michael Johnson added two sacks to Tech's effort.

== Postseason awards ==
ACC Coach of the Year
Coach Paul Johnson
ACC Player of the Year
Jonathan Dwyer, B-Back
ACC Jim Tatum Award
Darryl Richard, DT
AFCA Coaches' All-American
Michael Johnson, DE
Rivals.com All-American (2nd Team)
Morgan Burnett, Safety
All-ACC Team
First Team	Second Team
Jonathan Dwyer, B-Back; Andrew Gardner, OT; Michael Johnson, DE; Vance Walker, DT	Morgan Burnett, S; Cord Howard, OG; Darryl Richard, DT
