= 2008 PapaJohns.com Bowl =

- PapaJohns.com Bowl logo
NC State Wolfpack	Rutgers Scarlet Knights
(6–6)	(7–5)
ACC	Big East
23	29
Head coach: Tom O'Brien	Head coach: Greg Schiano
	1	2	3	4	Total
NC State	10	7	0	6	23
Rutgers	6	0	10	13	29
- Date: December 29, 2008
- Season: 2008
- Stadium: Legion Field
- Location: Birmingham, Alabama
- MVP: Rutgers QB Mike Teel
- Favorite: Rutgers by 6.5
- Referee: Todd Geerlings (Big Ten)
- Attendance: 38,582
- Payout: US$300,000 per team

United States TV coverage
- Network: ESPN
- Announcers: Eric Collins, Shaun King
- Nielsen ratings: 1.7

The 2008 PapaJohns.com Bowl was the third edition of the college football bowl game, and was played at Legion Field in Birmingham, Alabama. The game was played starting at 2 p.m. US CST on Monday, December 29, 2008. The game, telecast on ESPN, pitted the Rutgers Scarlet Knights against the North Carolina State Wolfpack.

The game marked the first ever meeting of the two universities' football programs. NC State led 17–6 at halftime, but crumbled in the second half after losing starting quarterback Russell Wilson to a knee injury. Rutgers won, 29–23.

This was also the first edition of the bowl game not to feature any current or former members of Conference USA. The selection of NC State did have a connection to past bowl games in Birmingham as the Wolfpack had competed in the last All-American Bowl, which was also held at Legion Field in 1990.

== Scoring summary ==
Scoring Play	Score
1st Quarter
Rutgers - Rob Cervini 6-yard TD run (kick blocked), 11:47	Rutgers 6–0
NCSU - Owen Spencer 44-yard TD pass from Russell Wilson (Josh Czajkowski kick), 7:54	NCSU 7–6
NCSU - Czajkowski 32-yard FG, 1:00	NCSU 10–6
2nd Quarter
NCSU - Andre Brown 5-yard TD run (Czajkowski kick), :38	NCSU 17–6
3rd Quarter
Rutgers - San San Te 31-yard FG, 10:14	NCSU 17–9
Rutgers - Tiquan Underwood 10-yard TD pass from Mike Teel (Te kick), 6:50	NCSU 17–16
4th Quarter
Rutgers - Te 28-yard FG, 13:31	Rutgers 19–17
NCSU - Anthony Hill 16-yard TD pass from Daniel Evans (two-point conversion no good), 9:21	NCSU 23–19
Rutgers - Kenny Britt 42-yard TD pass from Teel (Te kick), 8:30	Rutgers 26–23
Rutgers - Te 24-yard FG, :47	Rutgers 29–23
