= 2008 Duke Blue Devils football team =

American college football season

2008 Duke Blue Devils football
- Conference: Atlantic Coast Conference
- Coastal Division
- Record: 4–8 (1–7 ACC)
- Head coach: David Cutcliffe (1st season)
- Co-offensive coordinators: Kurt Roper (1st season); Matt Luke (1st season)
- Offensive scheme: Multiple
- Co-defensive coordinators: Mike MacIntyre (1st season); Marion Hobby (1st season)
- Base defense: Multiple
- MVP: Michael Tauiliili
- Captains: Greg Akinbiyi; Re'quan Boyette; Cameron Goldberg; Eron Riley; Vincent Rey; Tielor Robinson; Michael Tauiliili; Glenn Williams
- Home stadium: Wallace Wade Stadium

2008 Atlantic Coast Conference football standings
	Conf.			Overall
Team	W		L	W		L
Atlantic Division
Boston College xy	5	–	3	9	–	5
No. 21 Florida State x	5	–	3	9	–	4
Maryland	4	–	4	8	–	5
Wake Forest	4	–	4	8	–	5
Clemson	4	–	4	7	–	6
NC State	4	–	4	6	–	7
Coastal Division
No. 15 Virginia Tech xy$	5	–	3	10	–	4
No. 22 Georgia Tech x	5	–	3	9	–	4
North Carolina	0	–	4	0	–	5
Miami (FL)	4	–	4	7	–	6
Virginia	3	–	5	5	–	7
Duke	1	–	7	4	–	8
Championship: Virginia Tech 30, Boston College 12
$ – BCS representative as conference champion; x – Division champion/co-champions; y – Championship game participant; North Carolina vacated 8 wins, including 4 ACC wins; Rankings from AP Poll

The 2008 Duke Blue Devils football team represented the Duke University in the 2008 NCAA Division I FBS football season. The team was led by head coach David Cutcliffe. They played their homes games at Wallace Wade Stadium in Durham, North Carolina.

== Schedule ==
Date	Time	Opponent	Site	TV	Result	Attendance
August 30	7:00 pm	No. 3 James Madison*	Wallace Wade Stadium; Durham, NC	ACCS	W 31–7	32,571
September 6	7:00 pm	Northwestern*	Wallace Wade Stadium; Durham, NC	ACCS	L 20–24	23,614
September 13	12:00 pm	Navy*	Wallace Wade Stadium; Durham, NC	ESPNU	W 41–31	25,082
September 27	12:00 pm	Virginia	Wallace Wade Stadium; Durham, NC	ESPNU	W 31–3	25,527
October 4	12:00 pm	at Georgia Tech	Bobby Dodd Stadium; Atlanta, GA	ESPNU	L 0–27	46,104
October 18	3:30 pm	Miami (FL)^{†}	Wallace Wade Stadium; Durham, NC	ESPNU	L 31–49	32,011
October 25	3:00 pm	at Vanderbilt*	Vanderbilt Stadium; Nashville, TN		W 10–7	38,270
November 1	3:30 pm	at Wake Forest	BB&T Field; Winston-Salem, NC (rivalry)	ESPN360	L 30–33 ^{OT}	32,336
November 8	3:30 pm	NC State	Wallace Wade Stadium; Durham, NC (rivalry)	ESPN360	L 17–27	31,964
November 15	12:00 pm	at Clemson	Memorial Stadium; Clemson, SC	Raycom	L 7–31	76,217
November 22	5:30 pm	at Virginia Tech	Lane Stadium; Blacksburg, VA	ESPNU	L 3–14	66,233
November 29	3:30 pm	North Carolina	Wallace Wade Stadium; Durham, NC (Victory Bell)	ESPNU	L 20–28	30,322
*Non-conference game; ^{†}Homecoming; Rankings from The Sports Network Poll released prior to the game; All times are in Eastern time

== Personnel ==
=== Coaching staff ===
Name	Position	Seasons at Duke	Alma mater
David Cutcliffe	Head Coach	1st	Alabama (1976)
Kurt Roper	Co-offensive coordinator/Associate head coach/quarterbacks	1st	Rice (1995)
Matt Luke	Co-offensive coordinator/Offensive line	1st	Ole Miss (1999)
Mike MacIntyre	Co-defensive coordinator	1st	Georgia Tech (1989)
Marion Hobby	Co-defensive coordinator/Defensive line	1st	Tennessee (1995)

== Game summaries ==
=== James Madison ===
	1	2	3	4	Total
No. 3 (FCS) Dukes	7	0	0	0	7
Blue Devils	7	7	17	0	31

=== Northwestern ===
	1	2	3	4	Total
Wildcats	7	10	0	7	24
Blue Devils	7	3	3	7	20

=== Navy ===
	1	2	3	4	Total
Midshipmen	14	10	7	0	31
Blue Devils	10	10	14	7	41

=== Virginia ===
	1	2	3	4	Total
Cavaliers	3	0	0	0	3
Blue Devils	0	3	14	14	31

=== At Georgia Tech ===
	1	2	3	4	Total
Blue Devils	0	0	0	0	0
Yellow Jackets	0	3	7	17	27

=== Miami (FL) ===
	1	2	3	4	Total
Hurricanes	7	7	21	14	49
Blue Devils	0	17	7	7	31

=== At Vanderbilt ===
	1	2	3	4	Total
Blue Devils	0	7	3	0	10
Commodores	0	0	0	7	7

=== At Wake Forest ===
	1	2	3	4	OT	Total
Blue Devils	7	0	13	10	0	30
Demon Deacons	9	3	10	8	3	33

=== NC State ===
	1	2	3	4	Total
Wolfpack	10	14	3	0	27
Blue Devils	3	7	0	7	17

=== At Clemson ===
	1	2	3	4	Total
Blue Devils	0	0	0	7	7
Tigers	7	10	14	0	31

=== At Virginia Tech ===
	1	2	3	4	Total
Blue Devils	0	3	0	0	3
Hokies	0	7	0	7	14

=== North Carolina ===
	1	2	3	4	Total
Tar Heels	14	7	7	0	28
Blue Devils	14	3	3	0	20

== Season facts ==
- Duke's four wins equaled the team's win total from the previous four seasons combined
- According to the Sagarin rankings, Duke faced the second toughest schedule in the country
- Of the 11 NCAA Football Bowl Subdivision teams the Blue Devils played against, 10 became bowl-eligible (Virginia fell just short at 5-7). The 12th team, James Madison, went 12-1 in the Championship Subdivision.
- Duke place-kickers went 13-for-18 in field goal attempts, a 72.2 percent clip that was a team's best since 1998
- Punter Kevin Jones ranked third in the ACC with a 40.8-yard average per kick
- For the first time in history, attendance was over 30,000 for four home games
- Duke has finished last or tied for last in the ACC for five consecutive seasons and six out of the last seven

== Statistics ==
=== Team ===
	Team	Opp
Scoring	241	281
Points per game	20.1	23.4
First downs	213	212
Rushing	81	85
Passing	118	113
Penalty	14	14
Total offense	3646	4283
Avg per play	4.4	5.4
Avg per game	303.8	356.9
Fumbles-Lost	23-9	20-11
Penalties-Yards	56-526	56-490
Avg per game	43.8	40.8

	Team	Opp
Punts-Yards	74-2904	62-2352
Avg per punt	39.2	37.9
Time of possession/Game	30:21	29:39
3rd down conversions	67/183 (37%)	66/168 (39%)
4th down conversions	7/19 (37%)	5/19 (26%)
Touchdowns scored	29	35
Field goals-Attempts-Long	13-88-55	11-55
PAT-Attempts	28-28	34-34
Attendance	201091	257833
Games/Avg per Game	7/28727	5/51567

==== Scores by quarter ====
	1	2	3	4	Total
Duke	48	60	74	59	241
Opponents	78	71	69	60	278
