= 2008 NCAA Division I FBS football season =

American college football season

2008 NCAA Division I FBS season
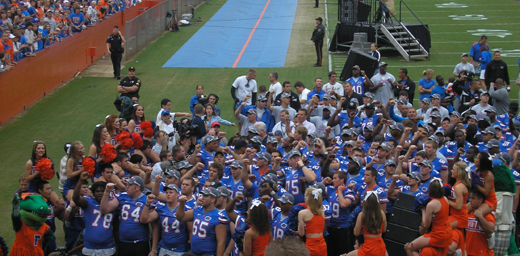
- Florida Gators celebrating after winning the 2009 BCS Championship Game
- Number of teams: 119 + 1 transitional (Note: Western Kentucky University was in a two-year process of transition to FBS status in 2008 (completed in 2009), and, therefore, some sources list the total for 2008 as 119.)
- Duration: August 28 – December 6
- Preseason AP No. 1: Georgia

Postseason
- Duration: December 20, 2008 – January 31, 2009
- Bowl games: 34
- Heisman Trophy: Sam Bradford (quarterback, Oklahoma)

Bowl Championship Series
- 2009 BCS Championship Game
- Site: Dolphin Stadium, Miami Gardens, Florida
- Champion(s): Florida

NCAA Division I FBS football seasons
- ← 2007 2009 →

The 2008 NCAA Division I FBS football season was the highest level of college football competition in the United States organized by the National Collegiate Athletic Association (NCAA).

The regular season began on August 28, 2008, and ended on December 6, 2008. The postseason concluded on January 8, 2009, with the BCS National Championship Game in Miami Gardens, Florida, which featured the top two teams ranked by the Bowl Championship Series (BCS): the No. 2 Florida Gators (No. 1 in the AP Poll) and No. 1 Oklahoma Sooners (No. 2 in the AP Poll). Florida defeated Oklahoma by a score of 24–14 to win their second BCS title in three years and third overall national championship in school history. The Utah Utes were selected national champions by Anderson & Hester after beating the Alabama Crimson Tide in the 2009 Sugar Bowl, finishing the season as the nation's only undefeated team.

== Rule changes ==
The NCAA football rules committee made rule changes for 2008, including the following:

- Teams have 40 seconds from the time a ball is declared dead to snap the ball. The 25 second play clock will still be used for administrative stoppages and penalties.
- The 15 second play clock after a TV timeout (adopted in the 2007 season) is repealed and returned to 25 seconds.
- Outside of the final two minutes of each half, if a runner goes out of bounds, the game clock restarts after the ball is spotted.
- The penalty for kicking the ball out of bounds on the kickoff is increased, placing the ball at the 40-yard line, similar to the NFL.
- Reinforcing that contact that leads with the crown of the helmet to another player (targeting) is a foul, penalized 15 yards.
- All face-mask penalties result in a 15-yard penalty. Incidental contact with the face mask is no longer penalized.
- Sideline warnings are now penalized five yards for the first two occurrences, and 15 yards (unsportsmanlike conduct) for the third and subsequent violations. Previously the officials gave teams two warnings before a five-yard penalty was called.
- All horse-collar tackles are now subject to a 15-yard penalty.
- If a coach challenges a play, and he wins the challenge, then he is given a second challenge to use later in the game, but each coach has a maximum of two challenges per game even if both are decided in his favor.

== Conference and program changes ==
Western Kentucky upgraded from Division I FCS and played the 2008 season as a transitional Division I FBS member.

School	2007 Conference	2008 Conference
Western Kentucky Hilltoppers	FCS Independent	FBS Independent

== Regular season top 10 matchups ==
Rankings reflect the AP Poll. Rankings for Week 8 and beyond will list BCS Rankings first and AP Poll second. Teams that failed to be a top 10 team for one poll or the other will be noted.

- Week 3
  - No. 1 USC defeated No. 5 Ohio State, 35–3 (Los Angeles Memorial Coliseum, Los Angeles, California)
- Week 4
  - No. 6 LSU defeated No. 10 Auburn, 26–21 (Jordan-Hare Stadium, Auburn, Alabama)
- Week 5
  - No. 8 Alabama defeated No. 3 Georgia, 41–30 (Sanford Stadium, Athens, Georgia)
- Week 7
  - No. 5 Texas defeated No. 1 Oklahoma, 45–35 (Cotton Bowl, Dallas, Texas)
- Week 9
  - No. 1/1 Texas defeated No. 6/7 Oklahoma State, 28–24 (Darrell K Royal–Texas Memorial Stadium, Austin, Texas)
  - No. 3/3 Penn State defeated No. 9/10 Ohio State, 13–6 (Ohio Stadium, Columbus, Ohio)
- Week 10
  - No. 7/6 Texas Tech defeated No. 1/1 Texas, 39–33 (Jones AT&T Stadium, Lubbock, Texas)
  - No. 8/8 Florida defeated No. 6/5 Georgia, 49–10 (Jacksonville Municipal Stadium, Jacksonville, Florida)
- Week 11
  - No. 2/2 Texas Tech defeated No. 9/8 Oklahoma State, 56–20 (Jones AT&T Stadium, Lubbock, Texas)
- Week 13
  - No. 5/5 Oklahoma defeated No. 2/2 Texas Tech, 65–21 (Oklahoma Memorial Stadium, Norman, Oklahoma)
- Week 15
  - No. 4/2 Florida defeated No. 1/1 Alabama, 31–20 (2008 SEC Championship Game, Georgia Dome, Atlanta, Georgia)

== Most-watched regular season games ==
Rank	Date	Matchup	Channel	Viewers
1	December 6, 4:00 ET	No. 2 Florida vs. No. 1 Alabama	CBS, SEC Championship	15.061 Million
2	November 1, 8:00 ET	No. 1 Texas vs. No. 7 Texas Tech	ESPN on ABC	12.204 Million
3	September 13, 8:00 ET	No. 5 Ohio State vs. No. 1 USC	ESPN on ABC	11.800 Million
4	November 22, 8:00 ET	No. 2 Texas Tech vs. No. 5 Oklahoma	ESPN on ABC	10.742 Million
5	October 25, 8:00 ET	No. 3 Penn State vs. No. 9 Ohio State	ESPN on ABC	10.367 Million
6	November 29, 8:00 ET	No. 3 Oklahoma vs. No. 12 Oklahoma State	ESPN on ABC	9.525 Million
7	December 6, 8:00 ET	No. 20 Missouri vs. No. 2 Oklahoma	ESPN on ABC, Big 12 Championship	8.762 Million
8	November 8, 8:00 ET	No. 9 Oklahoma State vs. No. 2 Texas Tech, No. 21 California vs No. 7 USC	Regional ESPN on ABC	8.483 Million
9	November 8, 3:30 ET	No. 1 Alabama vs. No. 16 LSU	CBS	8.137 Million
10	October 11, 12:00 ET	No. 5 Texas vs. No. 1 Oklahoma	ESPN on ABC	7.726 Million

== Conference standings ==
2008 Atlantic Coast Conference football standings
	Conf.			Overall
Team	W		L	W		L
Atlantic Division
Boston College xy	5	–	3	9	–	5
No. 21 Florida State x	5	–	3	9	–	4
Maryland	4	–	4	8	–	5
Wake Forest	4	–	4	8	–	5
Clemson	4	–	4	7	–	6
NC State	4	–	4	6	–	7
Coastal Division
No. 15 Virginia Tech xy$	5	–	3	10	–	4
No. 22 Georgia Tech x	5	–	3	9	–	4
North Carolina	0	–	4	0	–	5
Miami (FL)	4	–	4	7	–	6
Virginia	3	–	5	5	–	7
Duke	1	–	7	4	–	8
Championship: Virginia Tech 30, Boston College 12
$ – BCS representative as conference champion; x – Division champion/co-champions; y – Championship game participant; North Carolina vacated 8 wins, including 4 ACC wins; Rankings from AP Poll

2008 Big 12 Conference football standings
	Conf.			Overall
Team	W		L	W		L
North Division
No. 19 Missouri xy	5	–	3	10	–	4
Nebraska x	5	–	3	9	–	4
Kansas	4	–	4	8	–	5
Colorado	2	–	6	5	–	7
Kansas State	2	–	6	5	–	7
Iowa State	0	–	8	2	–	10
South Division
No. 5 Oklahoma xy$	7	–	1	12	–	2
No. 4 Texas x%	7	–	1	12	–	1
No. 12 Texas Tech x	7	–	1	11	–	2
No. 16 Oklahoma State	5	–	3	9	–	4
Baylor	2	–	6	4	–	8
Texas A&M	2	–	6	4	–	8
Championship: Oklahoma 62, Missouri 21
$ – BCS representative as conference champion; % – BCS at-large representative; x – Division champion/co-champions; y – Championship game participant; Rankings from AP Poll

2008 Big East Conference football standings
	Conf.			Overall
Team	W		L	W		L
No. 17 Cincinnati $	6	–	1	11	–	3
Pittsburgh	5	–	2	9	–	4
No. 23 West Virginia	5	–	2	9	–	4
Rutgers	5	–	2	8	–	5
Connecticut	3	–	4	8	–	5
South Florida	2	–	5	8	–	5
Louisville	1	–	6	5	–	7
Syracuse	1	–	6	3	–	9
$ – BCS representative as conference champion; Rankings from AP Poll

2008 Big Ten Conference football standings
	Conf.			Overall
Team	W		L	W		L
No. 8 Penn State $+	7	–	1	11	–	2
No. 9 Ohio State %+	7	–	1	10	–	3
No. 24 Michigan State	6	–	2	9	–	4
Northwestern	5	–	3	9	–	4
No. 20 Iowa	5	–	3	9	–	4
Wisconsin	3	–	5	7	–	6
Minnesota	3	–	5	7	–	6
Illinois	3	–	5	5	–	7
Purdue	2	–	6	4	–	8
Michigan	2	–	6	3	–	9
Indiana	1	–	7	3	–	9
$ – BCS representative as conference champion; % – BCS at-large representative; + – Conference co-champions; Rankings from AP Poll

2008 Conference USA football standings
	Conf.			Overall
Team	W		L	W		L
East Division
East Carolina x$	6	–	2	9	–	5
Memphis	4	–	4	6	–	7
Southern Miss	4	–	4	7	–	6
UAB	3	–	5	4	–	8
UCF	3	–	5	4	–	8
Marshall	3	–	5	4	–	8
West Division
Tulsa xy	7	–	1	11	–	3
Rice x	7	–	1	10	–	3
Houston	6	–	2	8	–	5
UTEP	4	–	4	5	–	7
Tulane	1	–	7	2	–	10
SMU	0	–	8	1	–	11
Championship: East Carolina 27, Tulsa 24
$ – Conference champion; x – Division champion/co-champions; y – Championship game participant; Rankings from AP Poll

2008 Mid-American Conference football standings
	Conf.			Overall
Team	W		L	W		L
East Division
Buffalo x$	5	–	3	8	–	6
Bowling Green	4	–	4	6	–	6
Temple	4	–	4	5	–	7
Ohio	3	–	5	4	–	8
Akron	3	–	5	5	–	7
Kent State	3	–	5	4	–	8
Miami (OH)	1	–	7	2	–	10
West Division
Ball State x	8	–	0	12	–	2
Central Michigan	6	–	2	8	–	5
Western Michigan	6	–	2	9	–	4
Northern Illinois	5	–	3	6	–	7
Toledo	2	–	6	3	–	9
Eastern Michigan	2	–	6	3	–	9
Championship: Buffalo 42, Ball State 24
$ – Conference champion; x – Division champion/co-champions

2008 Mountain West Conference football standings
	Conf.			Overall
Team	W		L	W		L
No. 2 Utah $	8	–	0	13	–	0
No. 7 TCU	7	–	1	11	–	2
No. 25 BYU	6	–	2	10	–	3
Air Force	5	–	3	8	–	5
Colorado State	4	–	4	7	–	6
UNLV	2	–	6	5	–	7
New Mexico	2	–	6	4	–	8
Wyoming	1	–	7	4	–	8
San Diego State	1	–	7	2	–	10
$ – Conference champion and BCS representative as top non-AQ school to meet automatic qualification criteria; Rankings from AP Poll

2008 Pacific-10 Conference football standings
	Conf.			Overall
Team	W		L	W		L
No. 3 USC $	8	–	1	12	–	1
No. 10 Oregon	7	–	2	10	–	3
No. 18 Oregon State	7	–	2	9	–	4
California	6	–	3	9	–	4
Arizona	5	–	4	8	–	5
Arizona State	4	–	5	5	–	7
Stanford	4	–	5	5	–	7
UCLA	3	–	6	4	–	8
Washington State	1	–	8	2	–	11
Washington	0	–	9	0	–	12
$ – Conference champion; Rankings from AP Poll

2008 Southeastern Conference football standings
	Conf.			Overall
Team	W		L	W		L
Eastern Division
No. 1 Florida x$#	7	–	1	13	–	1
No. 13 Georgia	6	–	2	10	–	3
Vanderbilt	4	–	4	7	–	6
South Carolina	4	–	4	7	–	6
Tennessee	3	–	5	5	–	7
Kentucky	2	–	6	7	–	6
Western Division
No. 6 Alabama x%	8	–	0	12	–	2
No. 14 Ole Miss	5	–	3	9	–	4
LSU	3	–	5	8	–	5
Arkansas	2	–	6	5	–	7
Auburn	2	–	6	5	–	7
Mississippi State	2	–	6	4	–	8
Championship: Florida 31, Alabama 20
# – BCS National Champion; $ – BCS representative as conference champion; % – BCS at-large representative; x – Division champion/co-champions; Rankings from AP Poll

2008 Sun Belt Conference football standings
	Conf.			Overall
Team	W		L	W		L
Troy $	6	–	1	8	–	5
Louisiana–Lafayette	5	–	2	6	–	6
Florida Atlantic	4	–	3	7	–	6
Arkansas State	4	–	3	6	–	6
FIU	3	–	4	5	–	7
Middle Tennessee	3	–	4	5	–	7
Louisiana–Monroe	3	–	4	4	–	8
North Texas	0	–	7	1	–	11
$ – Conference champion

2008 Western Athletic Conference football standings
	Conf.			Overall
Team	W		L	W		L
No. 11 Boise State $	8	–	0	12	–	1
Louisiana Tech	5	–	3	8	–	5
Nevada	5	–	3	7	–	6
Hawaii	5	–	3	7	–	7
Fresno State	4	–	4	7	–	6
San Jose State	4	–	4	6	–	6
Utah State	3	–	5	3	–	9
New Mexico State	1	–	7	3	–	9
Idaho	1	–	7	2	–	10
$ – Conference champion; Rankings from AP Poll

2008 NCAA Division I FBS independents football records
	Conf.			Overall
Team	W		L	W		L
Navy		–		8	–	5
Notre Dame		–		7	–	6
Army		–		3	–	9
WKU		–		2	–	10
Rankings from AP Poll

== FCS team wins over FBS teams ==
Italics denotes FCS teams.

Date	Visiting team	Home team	Site	Result	Attendance	Ref.
August 30	No. 14 (FCS) Cal Poly	San Diego State	Qualcomm Stadium • San Diego, California	29–27	26,851	
September 6	No. 15 (FCS) New Hampshire	Army	Michie Stadium • West Point, New York	28–10	25,762	
^{#}Rankings from AP Poll released prior to game.

== Conference champions ==
=== Conference championship games ===
Rankings reflect the Week 14 AP Poll before the games were played.

Date	Conference	Winner	Runner-up	Score	Site	TV
December 6	ACC	Virginia Tech	No. 18 Boston College	30–12	Raymond James Stadium; Tampa, Florida	ABC
December 6	Big 12	No. 4 Oklahoma	No. 19 Missouri	62–21	Arrowhead Stadium; Kansas City, Missouri	ABC
December 6	Conference USA	East Carolina	Tulsa	27–24	Skelly Field at H. A. Chapman Stadium; Tulsa, Oklahoma	ESPN2
December 5	MAC	Buffalo	No. 12 Ball State	42–24	Ford Field; Detroit, Michigan	ESPN2
December 6	SEC	No. 2 Florida	No. 1 Alabama	31–20	Georgia Dome; Atlanta, Georgia	CBS

=== Other conference champions ===
Rankings are from the Week 15 AP Poll.

Conference	Champion
Big East	No. 12 Cincinnati
Big Ten	No. 6 Penn State No. 10 Ohio State
Mountain West	No. 7 Utah
Pac-10	No. 5 USC
Sun Belt	Troy
WAC	No. 9 Boise State

== Bowl games ==
Winners are listed in boldface. Rankings are from the final pre-bowl AP Poll.

=== Bowl Championship Series ===
After the completion of the regular season and conference championship games, seven teams had secured BCS berths: ACC champion Virginia Tech, Big East champion Cincinnati, Big Ten champion Penn State, Big 12 champion Oklahoma, Pac-10 champion USC, SEC champion Florida, and Mountain West champion Utah, who qualified as the highest-ranked BCS non-AQ conference champion. With Oklahoma and Florida being selected to play in the championship, Texas and Alabama assumed their conference's berths in the Fiesta and Sugar Bowls, respectively. The remaining at-large berth was awarded to Ohio State, who were selected despite being ranked No. 10 by the BCS, behind No. 9 Boise State. BCS No. 7 Texas Tech did not receive an at-large bid because the Big 12 had already been awarded the maximum of two BCS selections per conference.

Bowl Game	Date	Visitor	Home	Score	TV
Rose Bowl Game presented by Citi (Pasadena, CA)	January 1	**No. 5 USC**	No. 6 Penn State	38–24	ABC
FedEx Orange Bowl (Miami Gardens, FL)	January 1	No. 12 Cincinnati	**No. 21 Virginia Tech**	7–20	FOX
Allstate Sugar Bowl (New Orleans, LA)	January 2	**No. 7 Utah**	No. 4 Alabama	31–17	FOX
Tostitos Fiesta Bowl (Glendale, AZ)	January 5	No. 10 Ohio State	**No. 3 Texas**	21–24	FOX
FedEx BCS National Championship Game (Miami Gardens, FL)	January 8	**No. 1 Florida**	No. 2 Oklahoma	24–14	FOX

=== Other bowl games ===
Bowl Game	Date	Visitor	Home	Score	TV
EagleBank Bowl (Washington, D.C.)	December 20	**Wake Forest**	Navy	29–19	ESPN
New Mexico Bowl (Albuquerque, NM)	December 20	**Colorado State**	Fresno State	40–35	ESPN
magicJack St. Petersburg Bowl (St. Petersburg, FL)	December 20	Memphis	**South Florida**	14–41	ESPN2
Pioneer Las Vegas Bowl (Las Vegas, NV)	December 20	No. 17 BYU	**Arizona**	21–31	ESPN
R+L Carriers New Orleans Bowl (New Orleans, LA)	December 21	**Southern Mississippi**	Troy	30–27	ESPN
SDCCU Poinsettia Bowl (San Diego, CA)	December 23	No. 9 Boise State	**No. 11 TCU**	16–17	ESPN
Sheraton Hawaiʻi Bowl (ʻAiea, HI)	December 24	Hawaiʻi	**Notre Dame**	21–49	ESPN
Motor City Bowl (Detroit, MI)	December 26	**Florida Atlantic**	Central Michigan	24–21	ESPN
Meineke Car Care Bowl (Charlotte, NC)	December 27	**West Virginia**	North Carolina	31–30	ESPN
Champs Sports Bowl (Orlando, FL)	December 27	Wisconsin	**Florida State**	13–42	ESPN
Emerald Bowl (San Francisco, CA)	December 27	Miami (FL)	**California**	17–24	ESPN
Independence Bowl (Shreveport, LA)	December 28	Northern Illinois	**Louisiana Tech**	10–17	ESPN
Papajohns.com Bowl (Birmingham, AL)	December 29	NC State	**Rutgers**	23–29	ESPN2
Valero Alamo Bowl (San Antonio, TX)	December 29	**No. 25 Missouri**	No. 22 Northwestern	30–23 (OT)	ESPN
Roady's Truck Stops Humanitarian Bowl (Boise, ID)	December 30	**Maryland**	Nevada	42–35	ESPN2
Texas Bowl (Houston, TX)	December 30	**Rice**	Western Michigan	38–14	NFL Network
Pacific Life Holiday Bowl (San Diego, CA)	December 30	No. 13 Oklahoma State	**No. 15 Oregon**	31–42	ESPN
Bell Helicopters Armed Forces Bowl (Fort Worth, TX)	December 31	**Houston**	Air Force	34–28	ESPN
Brut Sun Bowl (El Paso, TX)	December 31	**No. 24 Oregon State**	No. 18 Pittsburgh	3–0	CBS
Gaylord Hotels Music City Bowl (Nashville, TN)	December 31	Boston College	**Vanderbilt**	14–16	ESPN
Insight Bowl (Tempe, AZ)	December 31	**Kansas**	Minnesota	42–21	NFL
Chick-fil-A Bowl (Atlanta, GA)	December 31	**LSU**	No. 14 Georgia Tech	38–3	ESPN
Outback Bowl (Tampa, FL)	January 1	South Carolina	**Iowa**	10–31	ESPN
Konica Minolta Gator Bowl (Jacksonville, FL)	January 1	**Nebraska**	Clemson	26–21	CBS
Capital One Bowl (Orlando, FL)	January 1	**No. 16 Georgia**	No. 19 Michigan State	24–12	ABC
Cotton Bowl Classic (Dallas, TX)	January 2	**No. 20 Ole Miss**	No. 8 Texas Tech	47–34	FOX
AutoZone Liberty Bowl (Memphis, TN)	January 2	**Kentucky**	East Carolina	25–19	ESPN
International Bowl (Toronto, ON, Canada)	January 3	Buffalo	**Connecticut**	20–38	ESPN2
GMAC Bowl (Mobile, AL)	January 6	**Tulsa**	No. 23 Ball State	45–13	ESPN

=== Bowl Challenge Cup standings ===
Conference	Wins	Losses	Pct.
Pac-10	5	0	1.000
SEC	6	2	.750
Big East	4	2	.667
C-USA	4	2	.667
MWC	3	2	.600
Big 12	4	3	.571
Sun Belt *	1	1	.500
ACC	4	6	.400
WAC	1	4	.200
Big Ten	1	6	.143
MAC	0	5	.000

* Does not meet minimum game requirement of three teams needed for a conference to be eligible.

== Awards and honors ==
=== Heisman Trophy voting ===
The Heisman Trophy is given to the year's most outstanding player

Player	School	Position	1st	2nd	3rd	Total
Sam Bradford	Oklahoma	QB	300	315	196	1,726
Colt McCoy	Texas	QB	266	288	230	1,604
Tim Tebow	Florida	QB	309	207	234	1,575
Graham Harrell	Texas Tech	QB	13	44	86	213
Michael Crabtree	Texas Tech	WR	3	27	53	116
Shonn Greene	Iowa	RB	5	9	32	65
Pat White	West Virginia	QB	3	1	8	19
Nate Davis	Ball State	QB	0	1	8	10
Rey Maualuga	USC	LB	2	1	1	9
Javon Ringer	Michigan State	RB	1	0	5	8

=== Other major award winners ===
Top Player

Award	Winner
Walter Camp Award	Colt McCoy, Texas
Griffin Award	Colt McCoy, Texas
Maxwell Award	Tim Tebow, Florida

Coaching

Award	Winner
The Home Depot Coach of the Year Award	Nick Saban, Alabama
Associated Press Coach of the Year	Nick Saban, Alabama
Paul "Bear" Bryant Award (head coach)	Kyle Whittingham, Utah
Liberty Mutual Coach of the Year Award	Nick Saban, Alabama
Eddie Robinson Coach of the Year	Nick Saban, Alabama
Walter Camp Coach of the Year (head coach)	Nick Saban, Alabama
Broyles Award (assistant coach)	Kevin Wilson, Oklahoma

Offense

Award	Winner
Dave Rimington Trophy (Center)	A. Q. Shipley, Penn State
Davey O'Brien Award (Quarterback)	Sam Bradford, Oklahoma
Doak Walker Award (Running Back)	Shonn Greene, Iowa
Fred Biletnikoff Award (Wide Receiver)	Michael Crabtree, Texas Tech
John Mackey Award (Tight End)	Chase Coffman, Missouri
Johnny Unitas Award (Sr. Quarterback)	Graham Harrell, Texas Tech
Manning Award (quarterback)	Tim Tebow, Florida

Defense

Award	Winner
Bronko Nagurski Trophy (Defensive Player)	Brian Orakpo, Texas
Chuck Bednarik Award (Defensive Player)	Rey Maualuga, USC
Dick Butkus Award (Linebacker)	Aaron Curry, Wake Forest
Lott Trophy (defensive impact)	James Laurinaitis, Ohio State
Jim Thorpe Award (Defensive Back)	Malcolm Jenkins, Ohio State
Ted Hendricks Award (defensive end)	Brian Orakpo, Texas

Lineman

Award	Winner
Outland Trophy (interior lineman)	Andre Smith, Alabama
Lombardi Award (Top Lineman)	Brian Orakpo, Texas

Special teams

Award	Winner
Ray Guy Award (punter)	Matt Fodge, Oklahoma State
Lou Groza Award (placekicker)	Graham Gano, Florida State

Other

Award	Winner
Draddy Trophy ("Academic Heisman")	Alex Mack, California
Wuerffel Trophy (humanitarian-athlete)	Tim Tebow, Florida

=== All-Americans ===
2008 Consensus All-America Team

Offense
Position	Name	Height	Weight (lbs.)	Class	Hometown	Team
QB	Sam Bradford	6'4"	223	So.	Oklahoma City, Oklahoma	Oklahoma
RB	Shonn Greene	5'11"	235	Sr.	Atco, New Jersey	Iowa
RB	Javon Ringer	5'9"	202	Sr.	Dayton, Ohio	Michigan State
WR	Michael Crabtree	6'3"	214	So.	Dallas, Texas	Texas Tech
WR	Dez Bryant	6'2"	225	So.	Lufkin, Texas	Oklahoma State
TE	Chase Coffman	6'6"	244	Sr.	Peculiar, Missouri	Missouri
T	Andre Smith	6'4"	330	Jr.	Birmingham, Alabama	Alabama
T	Michael Oher	6'5"	322	Sr.	Memphis, Tennessee	Mississippi
G	Duke Robinson	6'5"	329	Sr.	Atlanta, Georgia	Oklahoma
G	Brandon Carter	6'7"	334	Jr.	Longview, Texas	Texas Tech
C	Antoine Caldwell	6'3"	305	Sr.	Montgomery, Alabama	Alabama

Defense
Position	Name	Height	Weight (lbs.)	Class	Hometown	Team
DE	Brian Orakpo	6'3"	263	Sr.	Greenwood, Mississippi	Texas
DE	Aaron Maybin	6'4"	249	Jr.	Baltimore, Maryland	Penn State
DT	Terrence Cody	6'5"	365	Jr.	Fort Myers, Florida	Alabama
DE	Jerry Hughes	6'3"	257	Jr.	Sugar Land, Texas	TCU
LB	Rey Maualuga	6'2"	260	Sr.	Eureka, California	USC
LB	James Laurinaitis	6'4"	244	Sr.	Wayzata, Minnesota	Ohio State
LB	Brandon Spikes	6'3"	249	Jr.	Shelby, North Carolina	Florida
CB	Malcolm Jenkins	6'0"	204	Sr.	Piscataway, New Jersey	Ohio State
CB	Alphonso Smith	5'9"	190	Sr.	Pahokee, Florida	Wake Forest
Safety	Eric Berry	6'0"	211	So.	Fairburn, Georgia	Tennessee
Safety	Taylor Mays	6'3"	230	Jr.	Irving, Texas	USC

Special teams
Position	Name	Height	Weight (lbs.)	Class	Hometown	Team
Kicker	Louie Sakoda	5'9"	175	Sr.	San Jose, California	Utah
Punter	Kevin Huber	6'1"	214	Sr.	Cincinnati, Ohio	Cincinnati
RS	Brandon James	5'7"	186	Jr.	St. Augustine, Florida	Florida
RS	Jeremy Maclin	6'0"	198	Jr.	Kirkwood, Missouri	Missouri

=== Statistical leaders ===
- Team scoring most points: Oklahoma, 716

== Coaching changes ==
=== Pre-season ===
Pre-season
Team	2008 coach	2007 coach
Arkansas	Bobby Petrino	Houston Nutt
Baylor	Art Briles	Guy Morriss
Georgia Tech	Paul Johnson	Chan Gailey
Hawaiʻi	Greg McMackin	June Jones
Houston	Kevin Sumlin	Art Briles
Michigan	Rich Rodriguez	Lloyd Carr
Mississippi	Houston Nutt	Ed Orgeron
Navy	Ken Niumatalolo	Paul Johnson
Nebraska	Bo Pelini	Bill Callahan
Northern Illinois	Jerry Kill	Joe Novak
SMU	June Jones	Phil Bennett
Southern Mississippi	Larry Fedora	Jeff Bower
Texas A&M	Mike Sherman	Dennis Franchione
UCLA	Rick Neuheisel	Karl Dorrell
Washington State	Paul Wulff	Bill Doba

=== In-season ===
In-season
Team	Interim coach	Former coach
Clemson	Dabo Swinney	Tommy Bowden

=== End of season ===
End of season
Team	Outgoing coach	Reason	Replacement
Army	Stan Brock	Fired	Rich Ellerson
Auburn	Tommy Tuberville	Resigned	Gene Chizik
Ball State	Brady Hoke	Hired as head coach at San Diego State	Stan Parrish
Boston College	Jeff Jagodzinski	Fired	Frank Spaziani
Bowling Green	Gregg Brandon	Fired	Dave Clawson
Eastern Michigan	Jeff Genyk	Fired	Ron English
Iowa State	Gene Chizik	Hired as head coach at Auburn	Paul Rhoads
Kansas State	Ron Prince	Fired	Bill Snyder
Miami (OH)	Shane Montgomery	Resigned	Mike Haywood
Mississippi State	Sylvester Croom	Resigned	Dan Mullen
New Mexico	Rocky Long	Resigned	Mike Locksley
New Mexico State	Hal Mumme	Fired	DeWayne Walker
Oregon	Mike Bellotti	Resigned to become Oregon athletic director	Chip Kelly
Purdue	Joe Tiller	Retired	Danny Hope
San Diego State	Chuck Long	Fired	Brady Hoke
Syracuse	Greg Robinson	Fired	Doug Marrone
Tennessee	Phillip Fulmer	Fired	Lane Kiffin
Toledo	Tom Amstutz	Resigned	Tim Beckman
Utah State	Brent Guy	Fired	Gary Andersen
Washington	Tyrone Willingham	Fired	Steve Sarkisian
Wyoming	Joe Glenn	Fired	Dave Christensen

== Final rankings ==
Rank	Associated Press	USA TODAY/AFCA^{*}
1	Florida	Florida
2	Utah	Southern California
3	Southern California	Texas
4	Texas	Utah^{≠}
5	Oklahoma	Oklahoma
6	Alabama	Alabama
7	Texas Christian	Texas Christian
8	Penn State	Penn State
9	Ohio State	Oregon
10	Oregon	Georgia
11	Boise State	Ohio State
12	Texas Tech	Texas Tech
13	Georgia	Boise State
14	Mississippi	Virginia Tech
15	Virginia Tech	Mississippi
16	Oklahoma State	Missouri
17	Cincinnati	Cincinnati
18	Oregon State	Oklahoma State
19	Missouri	Oregon State
20	Iowa	Iowa
21	Florida State	Brigham Young
22	Georgia Tech	Georgia Tech
23	West Virginia	Florida State
24	Michigan State	Michigan State
25	Brigham Young	California

* - The AFCA requires that their voters make the winner of the BCS Championship at the number one position in the final poll.
^{≠} - Kyle Whittingham, head coach of Utah, broke the AFCA requirement and voted his team number one on his ballot.

== Attendances ==
#	College football team	Average attendance
1	Michigan Wolverines	108,571
2	Penn State Nittany Lions	108,254
3	Ohio State Buckeyes	104,976
4	Tennessee Volunteers	101,448
5	Texas Longhorns	98,046
6	Georgia Bulldogs	92,746
7	LSU Tigers	92,383
8	Alabama Crimson Tide	92,138
9	Florida Gators	90,544
10	Auburn Tigers	86,915
11	USC Trojans	86,793
12	Oklahoma Sooners	85,075
13	Nebraska Cornhuskers	85,071
14	Texas A&M Aggies	82,193
15	Wisconsin Badgers	81,088
16	Notre Dame Fighting Irish	80,795
17	South Carolina Gamecocks	80,529
18	Clemson Tigers	78,001
19	Florida State Seminoles	77,968
20	Michigan State Spartans	74,858
21	UCLA Bruins	72,795
22	Iowa Hawkeyes	70,169
23	Kentucky Wildcats	69,434
24	Arkansas Razorbacks	68,740
25	Virginia Tech Hokies	66,233
26	Missouri Tigers	64,520
27	BYU Cougars	64,102
28	Arizona State Sun Devils	63,837
29	Washington Huskies	63,640
30	Illinois Fighting Illini	61,707
31	California Golden Bears	61,634
32	Oregon Ducks	58,444
33	West Virginia Mountaineers	58,085
34	North Carolina Tar Heels	57,829
35	Purdue Boilermakers	56,702
36	NC State Wolfpack	56,665
37	Virginia Cavaliers	53,815
38	Texas Tech Red Raiders	53,625
39	Ole Miss Rebels	53,005
40	Arizona Wildcats	52,440
41	Kansas Jayhawks	50,907
42	South Florida Bulls	49,690
43	Colorado Buffaloes	49,476
44	Pittsburgh Panthers	49,352
45	Minnesota Golden Gophers	48,958
46	Oklahoma State Cowboys	48,261
47	Maryland Terrapins	47,954
48	Georgia Tech Yellow Jackets	47,489
49	Iowa State Cyclones	47,429
50	Miami Hurricanes	46,299
51	Utah Utes	45,542
52	Kansas State Wildcats	45,190
53	Oregon State Beavers	44,931
54	Mississippi State Bulldogs	43,453
55	Rutgers Scarlet Knights	42,378
56	East Carolina Pirates	42,016
57	Boston College Eagles	41,037
58	Hawai'i Rainbow Warriors	41,010
59	Navy Midshipmen	40,802
60	Louisville Cardinals	39,680
61	UCF Knights	39,596
62	Connecticut Huskies	39,331
63	Vanderbilt Commodores	38,460
64	Air Force Falcons	38,134
65	Fresno State Bulldogs	37,864
66	UTEP Miners	37,296
67	Stanford Cardinal	34,258
68	Baylor Bears	34,124
69	Syracuse Orange	33,474
70	Boise State Broncos	32,275
71	Cincinnati Bearcats	31,965
72	Indiana Hoosiers	31,782
73	Wake Forest Demon Deacons	31,666
74	Washington State Cougars	30,719
75	TCU Horned Frogs	30,389
76	Southern Miss Golden Eagles	30,102
77	New Mexico Lobos	29,713
78	Duke Blue Devils	28,727
79	Northwestern Wildcats	28,590
80	Army Black Knights	27,752
81	Memphis Tigers	25,003
82	Marshall Thundering Herd	24,766
83	San Diego State Aztecs	24,376
84	Tulsa Golden Hurricane	24,368
85	Tulane Green Wave	22,750
86	Central Michigan Chippewas	22,659
87	Houston Cougars	21,518
88	Louisiana Ragin' Cajuns	21,468
89	Arkansas State Red Wolves	21,105
90	Colorado State Rams	21,008
91	San José State Spartans	20,952
92	UNLV Rebels	20,849
93	Middle Tennessee Blue Raiders	20,227
94	Rice Owls	20,179
95	SMU Mustangs	19,780
96	Louisiana-Monroe Warhawks	19,519
97	Troy Trojans	19,231
98	Ball State Cardinals	19,201
99	UAB Blazers	19,062
100	Nevada Wolf Pack	19,043
101	Eastern Michigan Eagles	18,951
102	Western Michigan Broncos	18,547
103	Wyoming Cowboys	18,234
104	Northern Illinois Huskies	18,185
105	Louisiana Tech Bulldogs	18,020
106	New Mexico State Aggies	17,756
107	Toledo Rockets	17,008
108	North Texas Mean Green	16,956
109	Buffalo Bulls	16,924
110	Florida Atlantic Owls	16,126
111	Bowling Green Falcons	15,701
112	Temple Owls	15,582
113	Miami RedHawks	15,435
114	Idaho Vandals	15,340
115	Ohio Bobcats	15,276
116	Utah State Aggies	14,736
117	Akron Zips	14,342
118	FIU Panthers	13,852
119	Kent State Golden Flashes	10,639

== See also ==
- 2008 Big 12 Conference South Division 3-way tie controversy
