= 2008 NC State Wolfpack football team =

American college football season

2008 NC State Wolfpack football

PapaJohns.com Bowl, L 23–29 vs. Rutgers
- Conference: Atlantic Coast Conference
- Atlantic Division
- Record: 6–7 (4–4 ACC)
- Head coach: Tom O'Brien (2nd season)
- Offensive coordinator: Dana Bible (2nd season)
- Offensive scheme: Pro-style
- Defensive coordinator: Mike Archer (2nd season)
- Base defense: 4–3
- Home stadium: Carter–Finley Stadium

2008 Atlantic Coast Conference football standings
	Conf.			Overall
Team	W		L	W		L
Atlantic Division
Boston College xy	5	–	3	9	–	5
No. 21 Florida State x	5	–	3	9	–	4
Maryland	4	–	4	8	–	5
Wake Forest	4	–	4	8	–	5
Clemson	4	–	4	7	–	6
NC State	4	–	4	6	–	7
Coastal Division
No. 15 Virginia Tech xy$	5	–	3	10	–	4
No. 22 Georgia Tech x	5	–	3	9	–	4
North Carolina	0	–	4	0	–	5
Miami (FL)	4	–	4	7	–	6
Virginia	3	–	5	5	–	7
Duke	1	–	7	4	–	8
Championship: Virginia Tech 30, Boston College 12
$ – BCS representative as conference champion; x – Division champion/co-champions; y – Championship game participant; North Carolina vacated 8 wins, including 4 ACC wins; Rankings from AP Poll

The 2008 NC State Wolfpack football team represented North Carolina State University during the 2008 NCAA Division I FBS football season. The team's head coach was Tom O'Brien. NC State has been a member of the Atlantic Coast Conference (ACC) since the league's inception in 1953, and has participated in that conference's Atlantic Division since 2005. The Wolfpack played its home games in 2008 at Carter–Finley Stadium in Raleigh, North Carolina, which has been NC State football's home stadium since 1966.

NC State was invited to the PapaJohns.com Bowl, where they lost, 29–23, to Rutgers.

== Schedule ==
Date	Time	Opponent	Site	TV	Result	Attendance
August 28	8:00 pm	at South Carolina*	Williams–Brice Stadium; Columbia, SC	ESPN	L 0–34	80,616
September 6	6:00 pm	William & Mary*	Carter–Finley Stadium; Raleigh, NC	ACCS	W 34–24	56,694
September 13	12:00 pm	at No. 23 Clemson	Memorial Stadium; Clemson, SC (Textile Bowl)	Raycom	L 9–27	77,071
September 20	12:00 pm	No. 15 East Carolina*	Carter–Finley Stadium; Raleigh, NC (rivalry)	ESPN	W 30–24 ^{OT}	57,583
September 27	7:30 pm	No. 13 South Florida*	Carter–Finley Stadium; Raleigh, NC	ESPNU	L 10–41	57,583
October 4	12:00 pm	Boston College^{†}	Carter–Finley Stadium; Raleigh, NC	Raycom	L 31–38	55,652
October 16	7:30 pm	Florida State	Carter–Finley Stadium; Raleigh, NC	ESPN	L 17–26	56,643
October 25	3:30 pm	at Maryland	Byrd Stadium; College Park, MD	ESPN360	L 24–27	45,018
November 8	3:30 pm	at Duke	Wallace Wade Stadium; Durham, NC (rivalry)	ESPN360	W 27–17	31,964
November 15	3:30 pm	No. 24 Wake Forest	Carter–Finley Stadium; Raleigh, NC (rivalry)	ESPNU	W 21–17	56,174
November 22	12:00 pm	at North Carolina	Kenan Memorial Stadium; Chapel Hill, NC (rivalry)	Raycom	W 41–10	60,000
November 29	12:00 pm	Miami (FL)	Carter–Finley Stadium; Raleigh, NC	Raycom	W 38–28	56,329
December 29	3:00 pm	vs. Rutgers*	Legion Field; Birmingham, AL (PapaJohns.com Bowl)	ESPN	L 23–29	38,582
*Non-conference game; ^{†}Homecoming; Rankings from Coaches' Poll released prior to the game; All times are in Eastern time
