= 2008 Virginia Cavaliers football team =

American college football season

2008 Virginia Cavaliers football
- Conference: Atlantic Coast Conference
- Coastal
- Record: 5–7 (3–5 ACC)
- Head coach: Al Groh (8th season)
- Offensive coordinator: Mike Groh (3rd season)
- Offensive scheme: West Coast
- Defensive coordinator: Bob Pruett (1st season)
- Base defense: 3–4
- Home stadium: Scott Stadium (Capacity: 61,500)

2008 Atlantic Coast Conference football standings
	Conf.			Overall
Team	W		L	W		L
Atlantic Division
Boston College xy	5	–	3	9	–	5
No. 21 Florida State x	5	–	3	9	–	4
Maryland	4	–	4	8	–	5
Wake Forest	4	–	4	8	–	5
Clemson	4	–	4	7	–	6
NC State	4	–	4	6	–	7
Coastal Division
No. 15 Virginia Tech xy$	5	–	3	10	–	4
No. 22 Georgia Tech x	5	–	3	9	–	4
North Carolina	0	–	4	0	–	5
Miami (FL)	4	–	4	7	–	6
Virginia	3	–	5	5	–	7
Duke	1	–	7	4	–	8
Championship: Virginia Tech 30, Boston College 12
$ – BCS representative as conference champion; x – Division champion/co-champions; y – Championship game participant; North Carolina vacated 8 wins, including 4 ACC wins; Rankings from AP Poll

The 2008 Virginia Cavaliers football team represented the University of Virginia during the 2008 NCAA Division I FBS football season. It was Virginia's 55th season as a member of the Atlantic Coast Conference (ACC). The Cavaliers were led by head coach Al Groh. They played their home games at Scott Stadium in Charlottesville, Virginia.

== Preseason ==
The 2008 preseason began in early January, with the loss of starting quarterback Jameel Sewell due to academic ineligibility as well as three other players who were not enrolled for the Spring 2008 semester; junior cornerback Chris Cook, freshman wide receiver Chris Dalton and freshman linebacker Darnell Carter.

In February 2008, defensive back Mike Brown was arrested by UVa police and charged with one count each of grand larceny, possession of stolen property with intent to sell, altering serial numbers, and possession of marijuana. Al Groh said of the situation, "At this time we are currently gathering the facts. In view of the nature of the allegation, Mike Brown is not participating with the program at this time." Also in February, defensive end Jeffery Fitzgerald left the school, and subsequently the team, after allegations of honor code violations; the university stating that, "Fitzgerald is no longer enrolled and will never play again for the 'Hoos."

== Peter Lalich controversy ==
On July 24, 2008, Peter Lalich, quarterback, was charged with unlawful purchase and possession of alcohol, a misdemeanor. Coach Groh would not comment on the charge, and stated that any disciplinary action would be dealt with internally, within the team. Lalich's case has been continued until July 21, 2009, at which point his charges will be dropped should he avoid further trouble.

On September 5, 2008, it was reported that Lalich had admitted to court officials that he had used marijuana and alcohol while on supervised probation. The voluntary admission came during a regular probation interview with officials from the office of Offender Aid and Restoration/Virginia Alcohol Safety Program. He was scheduled for a hearing on September 26. On September 10, 2008, the Virginia's sports information office announced that Lalich would not be starting in the September 13 game against the University of Connecticut.

On Thursday, September 18, Lalich admitted that he had violated the terms of his probation. Later the same day, he was dismissed from the Cavalier football team. In a statement, UVA Athletic Director Craig Littlepage said, "We have supported Peter, but believe today a point has been reached where it’s best for all concerned that [Peter] no longer participate on the team. This is my decision, and it has support of head football coach Al Groh. We wish Peter the best in the future."

== Schedule ==
Date	Time	Opponent	Site	TV	Result	Attendance
August 30	3:30 pm	No. 2 USC*	Scott Stadium; Charlottesville, VA	ABC	L 7–52	64,947
September 6	3:45 pm	Richmond*	Scott Stadium; Charlottesville, VA	ESPNU	W 16–0	51,007
September 13	7:30 pm	at Connecticut*	Rentschler Field; East Hartford, CT	ESPNU	L 10–45	40,000
September 27	12:00 pm	at Duke	Wallace Wade Stadium; Durham, NC	ESPNU	L 3–31	25,527
October 4	7:00 pm	Maryland	Scott Stadium; Charlottesville, VA (rivalry)	ESPNU	W 31–0	50,727
October 11	12:00 pm	East Carolina*	Scott Stadium; Charlottesville, VA	Raycom	W 35–20	52,398
October 18	3:30 pm	No. 18 North Carolina	Scott Stadium; Charlottesville, VA (South's Oldest Rivalry)	ABC	W 16–13 ^{OT}	52,342
October 25	3:30 pm	at No. 18 Georgia Tech	Bobby Dodd Stadium; Atlanta, GA	ESPNU	W 24–17	47,416
November 1	12:00 pm	Miami^{†}	Scott Stadium; Charlottesville, VA	Raycom	L 17–24 ^{OT}	53,308
November 8	3:30 pm	at Wake Forest	BB&T Field; Winston-Salem, NC	ESPNU	L 17–28	34,014
November 22	12:00 pm	Clemson	Scott Stadium; Charlottesville, VA	Raycom	L 3–13	51,979
November 29	12:00 pm	at Virginia Tech	Lane Stadium; Blacksburg, VA (Commonwealth Cup)	ESPN	L 14–17	66,233
*Non-conference game; ^{†}Homecoming; Rankings from Coaches' Poll released prior to the game; All times are in Eastern time

== Personnel ==
2008 Virginia Cavaliers football team roster
Players			Coaches
Offense: Pos. / # / Name / Class; QB / / Marc Verica	Defense: Pos. / # / Name / Class	Special teams: Pos. / # / Name / Class	Head coach: Al Groh; Coordinators/assistant coaches Legend: (C) Team captain; (S) Suspended; (I) Ineligible; Injured; Redshirt

== Coaching staff ==
Position	Name	Season
Head coach:	Al Groh	7th
Assistant head coach/Defensive coordinator coach:	Bob Pruett	1st
Offensive coordinator/quarterbacks coach:	Mike Groh	7th
Assistant head coach/defensive backs coach:	Steve Bernstein	2nd
Special teams coordinator/linebackers coach	Bob Diaco	2nd
Defensive assistant coach/assistant defensive line coach	Lervern Belin	2nd
Wide receivers coach:	Wayne Lineburg	1st
Running game coordinator/offensive line coach	Dave Borbely	2nd
Asst. Special teams coordinator/running backs coach	Anthony Poindexter	4th
Tight ends coach/recruiting coordinator	Bob Price	10th
Graduate assistant offense	Jim Jones	1st
Head strength coach	Matt Balis	1st
Director of football video operations	Luke Goldstein	6th

== Players ==
=== Recruiting ===
College recruiting (2008)
Name	Hometown	School	Height	Weight	Commit date	
Larry Richardson jr ATH	Chicago, IL	Von Stuben H.S	5 ft 8 in (1.73 m)	145 lb (66 kg)	4.41	Dec 11, 2007
Larry Richardson jr ATH	Recruit ratings: Scout: Rivals: (76)					
Overall recruit ranking:
Note: In many cases, Scout, Rivals, 247Sports, On3, and ESPN may conflict in their listings of height and weight.; In these cases, the average was taken. ESPN grades are on a 100-point scale.; Sources: "2008 Team Ranking". Rivals.com.

-->

== Game summaries ==
=== USC ===
The No. 3 ranked Trojans scored three touchdowns in the first quarter to beat the Cavaliers to win the first game of the season. USC quarterback Mark Sanchez threw for 338 yards, CJ Gable ran for 73 yards, and Ronald Johnson had 78 yards in receiving. The second half was all USC, with UVA turning over the ball three times.

	1	2	3	4	Total
USC	21	3	14	14	52
Virginia	7	0	0	0	7

Scoring summary

Quarter	Time	Drive			Team	Scoring information	Score	
Quarter	Time	Plays	Yards	TOP	Team	Scoring information	USC	Virginia
"TOP" = time of possession. For other American football terms, see Glossary of American football.							52	7

=== Richmond ===
	1	2	3	4	Total
Richmond	0	0	0	0	0
Virginia	3	0	0	13	16

Scoring summary

Quarter	Time	Drive			Team	Scoring information	Score	
Quarter	Time	Plays	Yards	TOP	Team	Scoring information	Richmond	Virginia
"TOP" = time of possession. For other American football terms, see Glossary of American football.							0	16

=== Connecticut ===
	1	2	3	4	Total
Virginia	0	0	3	7	10
Connecticut	7	21	14	3	45

Scoring summary

Quarter	Time	Drive			Team	Scoring information	Score	
Quarter	Time	Plays	Yards	TOP	Team	Scoring information	Virginia	Connecticut
"TOP" = time of possession. For other American football terms, see Glossary of American football.							10	45

=== Duke ===
	1	2	3	4	Total
Virginia	3	0	0	0	3
Duke	0	3	14	14	31

Scoring summary

Quarter	Time	Drive			Team	Scoring information	Score	
Quarter	Time	Plays	Yards	TOP	Team	Scoring information	Virginia	Duke
"TOP" = time of possession. For other American football terms, see Glossary of American football.							3	31

=== Maryland ===
	1	2	3	4	Total
Maryland	0	0	0	0	0
Virginia	7	14	10	0	31

Scoring summary

Quarter	Time	Drive			Team	Scoring information	Score	
Quarter	Time	Plays	Yards	TOP	Team	Scoring information	Maryland	Virginia
"TOP" = time of possession. For other American football terms, see Glossary of American football.							0	31

=== East Carolina ===
	1	2	3	4	Total
East Carolina	6	0	7	7	20
Virginia	7	21	0	7	35

Scoring summary

Quarter	Time	Drive			Team	Scoring information	Score	
Quarter	Time	Plays	Yards	TOP	Team	Scoring information	East Carolina	Virginia
"TOP" = time of possession. For other American football terms, see Glossary of American football.							20	35

=== North Carolina ===
	1	2	3	4	OT	Total
North Carolina	7	0	0	3	3	13
Virginia	0	0	3	7	6	16

Scoring summary

Quarter	Time	Drive			Team	Scoring information	Score	
Quarter	Time	Plays	Yards	TOP	Team	Scoring information	North Carolina	Virginia
"TOP" = time of possession. For other American football terms, see Glossary of American football.							13	16

=== Georgia Tech ===
	1	2	3	4	Total
Virginia	3	7	7	7	24
Georgia Tech	14	0	0	3	17

Scoring summary

Quarter	Time	Drive			Team	Scoring information	Score	
Quarter	Time	Plays	Yards	TOP	Team	Scoring information	Virginia	Georgia Tech
"TOP" = time of possession. For other American football terms, see Glossary of American football.							24	17

=== Miami ===
	1	2	3	4	OT	Total
Miami	7	3	0	7	7	24
Virginia	10	7	0	0	0	17

Scoring summary

Quarter	Time	Drive			Team	Scoring information	Score	
Quarter	Time	Plays	Yards	TOP	Team	Scoring information	Miami	Virginia
"TOP" = time of possession. For other American football terms, see Glossary of American football.							24	17

=== Wake Forest ===
	1	2	3	4	Total
Virginia	0	3	0	14	17
Wake Forest	14	14	0	0	28

Scoring summary

Quarter	Time	Drive			Team	Scoring information	Score	
Quarter	Time	Plays	Yards	TOP	Team	Scoring information	Virginia	Wake Forest
"TOP" = time of possession. For other American football terms, see Glossary of American football.							17	28

=== Clemson ===
	1	2	3	4	Total
Clemson	7	3	0	3	13
Virginia	0	3	0	0	3

Scoring summary

Quarter	Time	Drive			Team	Scoring information	Score	
Quarter	Time	Plays	Yards	TOP	Team	Scoring information	Clemson	Virginia
"TOP" = time of possession. For other American football terms, see Glossary of American football.							13	3

=== Virginia Tech ===
	1	2	3	4	Total
Virginia	7	7	0	0	14
Virginia Tech	7	0	7	3	17

Scoring summary

Quarter	Time	Drive			Team	Scoring information	Score	
Quarter	Time	Plays	Yards	TOP	Team	Scoring information	Virginia	Virginia Tech
"TOP" = time of possession. For other American football terms, see Glossary of American football.							14	17

== Rankings ==
Ranking movements
	Week															
Poll	Pre	1	2	3	4	5	6	7	8	9	10	11	12	13	14	Final
AP																
Coaches																
Harris	Not released															Not released
BCS	Not released															Not released

== Statistics ==
=== Team ===
	Team	Opp
Scoring		
Points per game		
First downs		
Rushing		
Passing		
Penalty		
Total offense		
Avg per play		
Avg per game		
Fumbles-Lost		
Penalties-Yards		
Avg per game		

	Team	Opp
Punts-Yards		
Avg per punt		
Time of possession/Game		
3rd down conversions		
4th down conversions		
Touchdowns scored		
Field goals-Attempts-Long		
PAT-Attempts		
Attendance		
Games/Avg per Game		

==== Scores by quarter ====
	1	2	3	4	Total
Virginia					0
Opponents					0

=== Offense ===
==== Rushing ====
Name	GP-GS	Att	Gain	Loss	Net	Avg	TD	Long	Avg/G
Total Larry Richardson jr	12-10	179	1307				12		
Total Raymond Edwards	12 -12	211	1591				18		

==== Passing ====
Name	GP-GS	Effic	Att-Cmp-Int	Pct	Yds	TD	Lng	Avg/G
Total								
Opponents								

==== Receiving ====
Name	GP-GS	No.	Yds	Avg	TD	Long	Avg/G
Total Darrin Washington	12-12	17	1399	13.4	11	109	109.9
Opponents							

=== Defense ===
Name	GP	Tackles				Sacks	Pass defense		Interceptions				Fumbles		Blkd Kick
Name	GP	Solo	Ast	Total	TFL-Yds	No-Yds	BrUp	QBH	No.-Yds	Avg	TD	Long	Rcv-Yds	FF	Blkd Kick
Total															

=== Special teams ===
Name	Punting								Kickoffs				
Name	No.	Yds	Avg	Long	TB	FC	I20	Blkd	No.	Yds	Avg	TB	OB
Total													

Name	Punt returns					Kick returns				
Name	No.	Yds	Avg	TD	Long	No.	Yds	Avg	TD	Long
Total										
