= 2008 Miami Hurricanes football team =

American college football season

2008 Miami Hurricanes football

Emerald Bowl, L 17–24 vs. California
- Conference: Atlantic Coast Conference
- (Coastal)
- Record: 7–6 (4–4 ACC)
- Head coach: Randy Shannon (2nd season)
- Offensive coordinator: Patrick Nix (2nd season)
- Offensive scheme: Pro-style, spread
- Defensive coordinator: Bill Young (1st season)
- Base defense: 4–3, zone blitz
- Home stadium: Dolphin Stadium (Capacity: 74,916)

2008 Atlantic Coast Conference football standings
	Conf.			Overall
Team	W		L	W		L
Atlantic Division
Boston College xy	5	–	3	9	–	5
No. 21 Florida State x	5	–	3	9	–	4
Maryland	4	–	4	8	–	5
Wake Forest	4	–	4	8	–	5
Clemson	4	–	4	7	–	6
NC State	4	–	4	6	–	7
Coastal Division
No. 15 Virginia Tech xy$	5	–	3	10	–	4
No. 22 Georgia Tech x	5	–	3	9	–	4
North Carolina	0	–	4	0	–	5
Miami (FL)	4	–	4	7	–	6
Virginia	3	–	5	5	–	7
Duke	1	–	7	4	–	8
Championship: Virginia Tech 30, Boston College 12
$ – BCS representative as conference champion; x – Division champion/co-champions; y – Championship game participant; North Carolina vacated 8 wins, including 4 ACC wins; Rankings from AP Poll

The 2008 Miami Hurricanes football team represented the University of Miami during the 2008 NCAA Division I FBS football season. It was the Hurricanes' 83rd season of football and 5th as a member of the Atlantic Coast Conference. The Hurricanes were led by second-year head coach Randy Shannon and played their home games at Dolphin Stadium. They finished the season 7–6 overall and 4–4 in the ACC to finish in a tie for third place in the Coastal Division. They were invited to the Emerald Bowl where they lost to California, 24–17.

== Before the season ==
=== Roster changes ===
University of Miami safety Kenny Phillips and defensive end Calais Campbell made the decision to forgo their senior years and declare for the NFL Draft. Phillips was drafted in the first round, No. 31 overall by the New York Giants. Campbell was drafted in the second round, No. 50 overall to the Arizona Cardinals. Linebacker Tavaris Gooden was also drafted in the third round, No. 79 overall to the Baltimore Ravens. Senior quarterback Kirby Freeman, who split time with now undrafted free-agent Kyle Wright in 2007, was informed by the University of Miami coaching staff that he would begin the year third on the depth chart, behind redshirt freshman Robert Marve and true freshman Jacory Harris. Shocked at this news, Freeman decided to transfer, going back to his native Texas at Baylor University. Freshman Doug Wiggins, rated the nation's thirty-third best player coming out of high school by Rivals.com, transferred to Western Michigan. The reasons for the move were unclear but reports eventually surfaced that Wiggins had had trouble adjusting to his backup role. Freshman Chris Perry transferred to Texas Tech University after redshirting his freshman year at UM. Junior DajLeon Farr, previously a top tight end recruit out of high school, transferred to the University of Memphis. Daren Daly, a former walk-on kicker who previously attended Florida State University, also decided to transfer and faced his former Hurricanes team as a member of the UCF Golden Knights. Other transfers included George Robinson, George Timmons, Jerrell Mabry, Charlie Jones, Demetri Stewart, and Luqman Abdallah. Junior defensive end Courtney Harris suffered an Achilles injury and was out for the season.

=== Recruiting class of 2008 ===
Name	Pos	Ht	Wt	Hometown	High School/Prep School/Junior College
Travis Benjamin	WR	5-11	160	Belle Glades, Florida	Glades Central HS
Arthur Brown	LB	6-2	210	Wichita, Kansas	Wichita East HS
Ramon Buchanan	LB	6-1	195	Melbourne, Florida	Palm Bay HS
LaRon Byrd	WR	6-4	205	Boutte, Louisiana	Hahnville HS
John Calhoun	FB	6-3	235	Micco, Florida	Sebastian River HS
Thearon Collier	WR	5-9	163	Miami, Florida	Booker T. Washington HS
Taylor Cook	QB	6-7	230	Eagle Lake, Texas	Rice Consolidated HS
Marcus Forston	DT	6-2	305	Miami, Florida	Northwestern HS
Jordan Futch	LB	6-3	202	Hollywood, Florida	Chaminade Madonna College Prep
Gavin Hardin	LB	6-5	240	Jackson, Tennessee	Jackson Central-Merry High School
Antonio Harper	LB	6-4	220	Memphis, Tennessee	Melrose HS
Brandon Harris	CB	5-11	185	Miami, Florida	Booker T. Washington HS
Jacory Harris	QB	6-4	172	Miami, Florida	Northwestern HS
Patrick Hill	FB	5-11	248	Torrance, California	El Camino Comm. College
C.J. Holton	S	6-2	195	Crawfordville, Florida	Wakulla HS
Chris Jhon	S	6-0	200	Weston, Florida	Cypress Bay HS
Aldarius Johnson	WR	6-2	200	Miami, Florida	Northwestern HS
Davon Johnson	WR	5-11	170	Miami, Florida	Booker T. Washington HS
Ben Jones	OT	6-6	280	Miami, Florida	Northwestern HS
Zach Kane	FB/LB	6-3	220	Toms River, New Jersey	Toms River North HS
Jeremy Lewis	DT	6-3	295	West Palm Beach, Florida	Palm Beach Lakes HS
Brandon Marti	LB	6-0	196	Miami, Florida	Gulliver Prep
C.J. Odom	S	6-0	210	Ft. Myers, Florida	Ft. Myers HS
Micanor Regis	DT	6-3	300	Pahokee, Florida	Pahokee HS
Marcus Robinson	LB	6-2	210	Homestead, Florida	Homestead HS
Andrew Smith	DE	6-3	240	Coconut Creek, Florida	Monarch HS
Cannon Smith	QB	5-11	200	Chatham, Virginia	Hargrave Military Academy
Sean Spence	LB	6-1	200	Miami, Florida	Northwestern HS
Tommy Streeter	WR	6-6	200	Miami, Florida	Northwestern HS
Vaughn Telemaque	S	6-2	190	Long Beach, California	Long Beach Poly HS
Kendall Thompkins	WR	5-10	165	Miami, Florida	Northwestern HS
Brandon Washington	G	6-4	315	Miami, Florida	Northwestern HS
Jake Wieclaw	PK	6-2	180	New Lenox, Illinois	Lincoln Way Central HS
Joe Wylie	S	6-2	172	Lauderdale Lakes, Florida	Boyd Anderson

== Schedule ==
Date	Time	Opponent	Rank	Site	TV	Result	Attendance
August 28	7:30 pm	Charleston Southern*		Dolphin Stadium; Miami Gardens, FL	ESPN360	W 52–7	48,119
September 6	8:00 pm	at No. 5 Florida*		Ben Hill Griffin Stadium; Gainesville, FL (rivalry) (College GameDay)	ESPN	L 3–26	90,833
September 20	3:30 pm	at Texas A&M*		Kyle Field; College Station, TX	ABC	W 41–23	84,165
September 27	12:00 pm	North Carolina		Dolphin Stadium; Miami Gardens, FL	ESPN2	L 24–28	35,830
October 4	3:30 pm	Florida State		Dolphin Stadium; Miami Gardens, FL (rivalry)	ABC	L 39–41	65,786
October 11	3:45 pm	UCF*		Dolphin Stadium; Miami Gardens, FL	ESPNU	W 20–14	40,011
October 18	3:30 pm	at Duke		Wallace Wade Stadium; Durham, NC	ESPNU	W 49–31	32,011
October 25	12:00 pm	Wake Forest^{†}		Dolphin Stadium; Miami Gardens, FL	ESPNU	W 16–10	41,208
November 1	12:00 pm	at Virginia		Scott Stadium; Charlottesville, VA	Raycom	W 24–17 ^{OT}	53,308
November 13	7:30 pm	Virginia Tech		Dolphin Stadium; Miami Gardens, FL (rivalry)	ESPN	W 16–14	46,838
November 20	7:30 pm	at Georgia Tech	No. 23	Bobby Dodd Stadium; Atlanta, GA	ESPN	L 23–41	49,335
November 29	12:00 pm	at NC State		Carter–Finley Stadium; Raleigh, NC	Raycom	L 28–38	56,329
December 27	8:00 pm	vs. California*		AT&T Park; San Francisco, CA (Emerald Bowl)	ESPN	L 17–24	42,268
*Non-conference game; ^{†}Homecoming; Rankings from AP Poll released prior to the game; All times are in Eastern time

== Game summaries ==
=== Charleston Southern ===
	1	2	3	4	Total
Charleston Southern	0	0	7	0	7
Miami	21	7	14	10	52

The game was the first time the Hurricanes played Charleston Southern. It was also the first home game for the Hurricanes in Dolphin Stadium with an attendance of 48,119.

=== Florida ===
	1	2	3	4	Total
Miami	0	3	0	0	3
#5 Florida	7	2	0	17	26

The Hurricanes had not lost to the Gators since 1985, owning six consecutive victories in the series. Overall, the Hurricanes leads the series 28–26. The game was the third-most watched game in ESPN history.

=== Texas A&M ===
	1	2	3	4	Total
Miami	14	10	17	0	41
Texas A&M	10	0	7	6	23

This game was played on September 20, 2008, at College Station, Texas, before a Kyle Field crowd of 84,165. The two schools had been against each other twice before: the Aggies won 70–14 in 1944, with Miami winning 34–17 in 2007.

For the Hurricanes, Robert Marve completed 16 of his 22 passes, for a total of 212 yards; he threw two touchdown passes, and suffered one interception. Graig Cooper ran for a career-best 128 yards and scored two touchdowns as the Hurricanes compiled 398 yards of offense for the game. The 18-point margin was Texas A&M's worst in a non-conference home contest since losing 30–10 to Alabama in 1988.

=== North Carolina ===
	1	2	3	4	Total
North Carolina	0	7	7	14	28
Miami	14	3	0	7	24

The two schools played for the fifth straight year, and the Tar Heels owned a 6–5 lead in the series heading into the game. UNC now leads the series 7–5.

=== Florida State ===
	1	2	3	4	Total
Florida State	7	17	10	7	41
Miami	0	3	19	17	39

The Hurricanes and Seminoles will meet for the 53rd time, last season, the Hurricanes defeated FSU 37–29 in Tallahassee and now holds a 30–22 lead in the series. The only time the two schools have met at Dolphin Stadium, UM won 16–14 in the 2004 Orange Bowl Classic.

=== UCF ===
	1	2	3	4	Total
UCF	0	7	0	7	14
Miami	10	0	0	10	20

This game, played on October 11, 2008, in Miami, was the first between the two schools, with Central Florida having joined Division I-A in 1996. For the Hurricanes, Graig Cooper ran for 90 yards and the game-winning touchdown on a career-high 23 attempts. The Hurricanes forced the Knights into punting 12 times, and limited their offense to a total of 78 yards (74 yards gained via the pass, and 4 yards on the ground). Despite the Hurricanes' defensive effort, the game remained close as UCF scored on an interception return of 62 yards, and on a 91-yard kickoff return.

=== Duke ===
	1	2	3	4	Total
Miami	7	7	21	14	49
Duke	0	17	7	7	31

Miami had a 4–1 lead in the series and had won three straight games since joining the ACC and four in a row altogether.

=== Wake Forest ===
	1	2	3	4	Total
Wake Forest	7	3	0	0	10
Miami	3	0	10	3	16

The only times the two teams have played in ACC action, the Hurricanes won both games by a combined score of 99–24, and UM held a 5–3 lead in the series.

=== Virginia ===
	1	2	3	4	OT	Total
Miami	7	3	0	7	7	24
Virginia	10	7	0	0	0	17

This was the sixth game between the two schools, and the fifth straight year the two schools had met.

=== Virginia Tech ===
	1	2	3	4	Total
Virginia Tech	0	7	0	7	14
Miami	7	0	6	3	16

Despite losing the last two games to VT, the Hurricanes still held a 16–9 lead in the series. Frank Beamer's Hokies were 11–3 the previous year and were the ACC champions. They lost the Orange Bowl to Kansas, where new Hurricanes defensive coordinator Bill Young held that position for the Jayhawks.

=== Georgia Tech ===
	1	2	3	4	Total
#23 Miami	0	3	7	13	23
Georgia Tech	3	21	17	0	41

Georgia Tech's triple option offense ran for 472 yards against the Hurricanes. The Jackets scored three second-quarter touchdowns and reached a 24–3 halftime lead. After that, the Hurricanes got no closer than 27–10 as Georgia Tech were successful. Late in the game, Georgia Tech ran the ball half-heartedly on 4th down to avoid scoring and avoid insulting the Hurricanes by either kneeling, kicking a field goal, or scoring a touchdown. The score was 41–10 at one point.

=== North Carolina State ===
	1	2	3	4	Total
Miami	7	7	7	7	28
North Carolina State	7	10	11	10	38

North Carolina State won 38–28.

=== Emerald Bowl ===
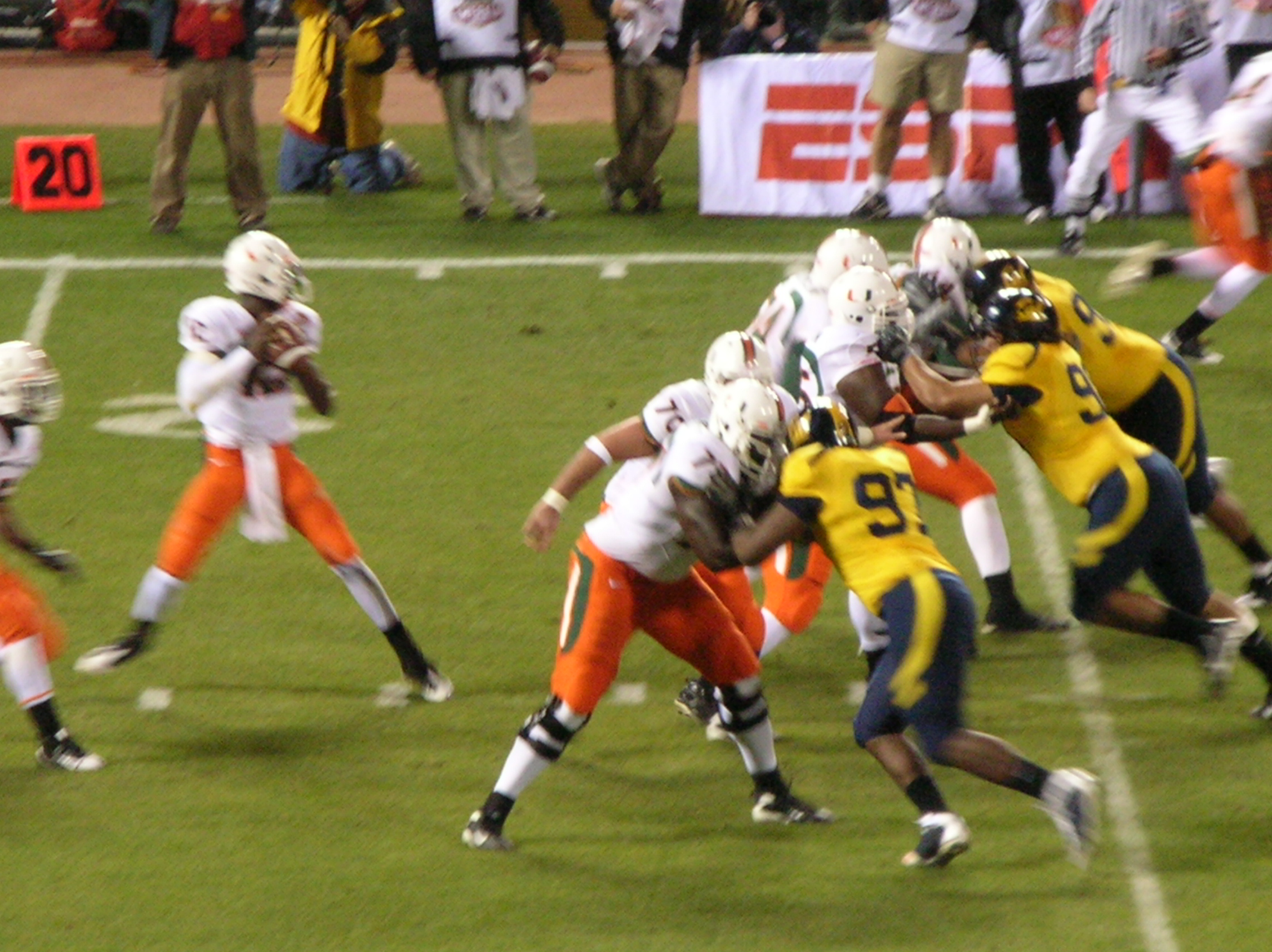
Hurricanes' quarterback looks to pass at the 2008 Emerald Bowl

	1	2	3	4	Total
Miami	0	7	7	3	17
California	14	0	3	7	24

The Hurricanes accepted an invitation to the 2008 Emerald Bowl in San Francisco to face California in what was essentially a home game for the Bears. Freshman quarterback Jacory Harris started at quarterback after Marve was suspended for academic reasons. Four other players were suspended for violating team rules and not allowed on the trip.

The Bears reached an early 14–0 lead, but Harris was able to lead the Hurricanes back with touchdown passes in the second and third quarter while the Hurricanes' defense was able to shut out the Cal offense in the second quarter and limited them to a field goal in the third. The go ahead score came late in the fourth quarter when Bears linebacker Zack Follett forced a fumble in the backfield by Harris that the Bears recovered and were able to convert into a touchdown. The game marked the third consecutive loss for the Hurricanes, while the bowl win was the end of Cal's season with three wins in a row.

== Rankings ==
Ranking movements Legend: ██ Increase in ranking ██ Decrease in ranking — = Not ranked
	Week															
Poll	Pre	1	2	3	4	5	6	7	8	9	10	11	12	13	14	Final
AP	—	—	—	—	—	—	—	—	—	—	—	—	23	—	—	—
Coaches	—	—	—	—	—	—	—	—	—	—	—	—	26	—	—	—
Harris	Not released					—	—	—	—	—	—	—	26	—	—	Not released
BCS	Not released							—	—	—	—	—	23	—	—	Not released

== Statistics ==
=== Team ===
	Team	Opp
Scoring	352	314
Points per game	27.1	24.2
First downs	220	214
Rushing	89	109
Passing	119	82
Penalty	12	23
Total offense	4238	4127
Avg per play	5.1	5.0
Avg per game	326.0	317.5
Fumbles-Lost	11-5	30-11
Penalties-Yards	74-605	63-537
Avg per game	46.5	41.3

	Team	Opp
Punts-Yards	69-2714	72-2736
Avg per punt	39.3	38.0
Time of possession/Game	29:28	30:32
3rd down conversions	64-189	66-182
4th down conversions	13-19	8-217
Touchdowns scored	42	39
Field goals-Attempts-Long	18-20-52	13-20-51
PAT-Attempts	40-40	37-37
Attendance	277792	365981
Games/Avg per Game	6/46299	6/60997

1/42268

==== Scores by quarter ====
	1	2	3	4	OT	Total
Miami	90	53	108	94	7	352
Opponents	65	98	69	82	0	314

=== Offense ===
==== Rushing ====
Name	GP-GS	Att	Gain	Loss	Net	Avg	TD	Long	Avg/G
Graig Cooper	13-11	171	888	47	841	4.9	4	51	64.7
Javarris James	9-1	68	299	13	286	4.2	4	13	31.8
Robert Marve	11-11	59	236	117	119	2.0	2	43	10.8
Lee Chambers	5-0	18	119	3	116	6.4	0	25	23.2
Derron Thomas	10-0	31	130	19	111	3.6	1	34	11.1
Jacory Harris	13-2	45	218	117	101	2.2	2	30	7.8
Shawnbrey McNeal	7-0	13	62	0	62	4.8	2	31	8.9
Travis Benjamin	12-5	5	42	0	42	8.4	1	18	3.5
Matt Bosher	13-13	1	9	0	9	9.0	0	9	0.7
Jason Fox	12-12	1	5	0	5	5.0	1	5	0.4
Davon Johnson	11-1	1	3	0	3	3.0	0	3	0.3
Cannon Smith	1-0	1	2	0	2	2.0	0	2	2.0
Thearon Collier	12-3	1	0	0	0	0.0	0	0	0.0
Total	13	426	2013	333	1680	3.9	17	51	129.2
Opponents	13	493	2444	470	1974	4.0	21	58	151.8

==== Passing ====
Name	GP-GS	Effic	Att-Cmp-Int	Pct	Yds	TD	Lng	Avg/G
Robert Marve	11-11	107.19	213-116-13	54.5	1293	9	69	117.5
Jacory Harris	13-2	125.76	194-118-7	60.8	1195	12	41	91.9
Graig Cooper	13-0	858.40	1-1-0	100.0	51	1	51	3.9
Travis Benjamin	12-0	242.80	1-1-0	100.0	17	0	17	1.4
Cannon Smith	1-0	116.80	1-1-0	100.0	2	0	2	2.0
TEAM	10-0	0.0	1-0-0	0.0	0	0	0	0.0
Total	13	117.88	411-237-20	57.7	2558	22	69	196.8
Opponents	13	117.37	336-172-4	51.2	2153	15	74	165.6

==== Receiving ====
Name	GP	Rec.	Yds	Avg	TD	Long	Avg/G
Aldarius Johnson	12	31	332	10.7	3	29	27.7
Graig Cooper	13	29	113	3.9	1	11	8.7
Thearon Collier	12	26	324	12.5	2	43	27.0
Dedrick Epps	12	22	304	13.8	2	69	25.3
Laron Byrd	13	21	228	10.9	4	26	17.5
Travis Benjamin	12	18	293	16.3	3	51	24.4
Kayne Farquharson	12	18	280	15.6	3	37	23.3
Chris Zellner	13	14	91	6.5	1	12	7.0
Leonard Hankerson	8	11	140	12.7	2	41	17.5
Sam Shields	13	11	124	11.3	0	23	9.5
Javarris James	9	11	118	10.7	0	20	13.1
Davon Johnson	11	5	71	14.2	1	18	6.5
Khalil Jones	8	5	39	7.8	0	11	4.9
Derron Thomas	10	4	35	8.8	0	19	3.5
Patrick Hill	13	4	17	4.2	0	10	1.3
Richard Gordon	12	3	24	8.0	0	15	2.0
Kendal Thompkins	2	2	4	2.0	0	6	2.0
Jacory Harris	13	1	17	17.0	0	17	1.3
Lee Chambers	5	1	4	4.0	0	4	0.8
Total	13	237	2558	10.8	22	69	196.8
Opponents	13	172	2153	12.5	15	74	165.6

=== Defense ===
Name	GP	Tackles				Sacks	Pass defense		Interceptions				Fumbles		Blkd Kick
Name	GP	Solo	Ast	Total	TFL-Yds	No-Yds	BrUp	QBH	No.-Yds	Avg	TD	Long	Rcv-Yds	FF	Blkd Kick
Total															

=== Special teams ===
Name	Punting								Kickoffs				
Name	No.	Yds	Avg	Long	TB	FC	I20	Blkd	No.	Yds	Avg	TB	OB
Matt Bosher	66	2659	40.3	76	3	24	19	2	69	3956	57.3	6	2
TEAM	3	55	18.3	31	0	0	0	1	0	0	0	0	0
Total	69	2714	39.3	76	3	24	19	3	69	3956	57.3	6	2

Name	Punt returns					Kick returns				
Name	No.	Yds	Avg	TD	Long	No.	Yds	Avg	TD	Long
Travis Benjamin	16	181	11.3	0	44	22	496	22.5	0	57
Thearon Collier	8	35	4.4	0	10	0	0	0.0	0	0
Graig Cooper	3	90	30.0	1	66	4	89	22.2	0	26
Richard Gordon	1	13	13.0	0	0	0	0	0.0	0	0
Brandon Harris	0	0	0.0	0	0	13	274	21.1	0	41
Ryan Hill	0	0	0.0	0	0	8	91	11.4	0	29
Darryl Sharpton	0	0	0.0	0	0	3	18	6.0	0	9
Patrick Hill	0	0	0.0	0	0	1	9	9.0	0	9
Kylan Robinson	0	0	0.0	0	0	1	8	8.0	0	8
TEAM	0	0	0.0	0	0	1	0	0.0	0	0
Sam Shields	0	0	0.0	0	0	0	35	0.0	0	35
Total	28	319	11.4	1	66	53	1020	19.2	0	57

== Coaching staff ==
Position	Name	Yrs. in Current Pos.
Head coach	Randy Shannon	2nd
Offensive Coordinator	Patrick Nix	2nd
Defensive Coordinator	Bill Young	1st
Special Teams / TEs	Joe Pannunzio	3rd
Quarterbacks	Patrick Nix	2nd
Running Backs	Tommie Robinson	2nd
Wide Receivers	Aubrey Hill	1st
Offensive Line	Jeff Stoutland	2nd
Defensive Line	Clint Hurtt	3rd
Linebackers	Michael Barrow	2nd
Defensive Backs	Wesley McGriff	2nd
Strength & Conditioning	Andreu Swasey	7th
