= 2008 Big Ten Conference football season =

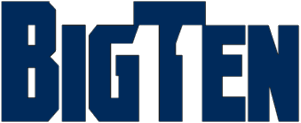
- League: NCAA Division I FBS (Football Bowl Subdivision)
- Sport: football
- Duration: September, 2008 through January, 2009
- Teams: 11
- TV partner(s): ABC, ESPN, ESPN2, Big Ten Network

2009 NFL Draft
- Top draft pick: Aaron Maybin (Penn State)
- Picked by: Buffalo Bills, first round (11th overall)

Regular Season
- Co-Champions: Penn State Ohio State
- Runners-up: Michigan State
- Season MVP: Shonn Greene

Football seasons
- 2007 2009

2008 Big Ten Conference football standings
	Conf.			Overall
Team	W		L	W		L
No. 8 Penn State $+	7	–	1	11	–	2
No. 9 Ohio State %+	7	–	1	10	–	3
No. 24 Michigan State	6	–	2	9	–	4
Northwestern	5	–	3	9	–	4
No. 20 Iowa	5	–	3	9	–	4
Wisconsin	3	–	5	7	–	6
Minnesota	3	–	5	7	–	6
Illinois	3	–	5	5	–	7
Purdue	2	–	6	4	–	8
Michigan	2	–	6	3	–	9
Indiana	1	–	7	3	–	9
$ – BCS representative as conference champion; % – BCS at-large representative; + – Conference co-champions; Rankings from AP Poll

The 2008 Big Ten Conference football season was the 113th season for the Big Ten.

== Preseason ==
Ohio State was selected as the preseason favorite to win the conference with Wisconsin and Illinois second and third, respectively by the Media. Ohio State running back Chris Wells was chosen as the Preseason Big Ten Offensive Player of the year while fellow Buckeye linebacker James Laurinaitis was named the Preseason Big Ten Defensive Player of the year.

Purdue Head Coach Joe Tiller entered his final season, while Michigan's Rich Rodriguez began his first in Ann Arbor.

In a given year, each Big Ten team will play eight of the other Big Ten teams. Thus for any given team in a given year, there are two others which will not be competed against. Below is the breakdown of "no-plays" for 2008:

Team—Does not play

- Illinois—Michigan State, Purdue
- Indiana—Michigan, Ohio State
- Iowa—Michigan, Ohio State
- Michigan—Indiana, Iowa
- Michigan State—Illinois, Minnesota
- Minnesota—Michigan State, Penn State
- Northwestern—Penn State, Wisconsin
- Ohio State—Indiana, Iowa
- Penn State—Minnesota, Northwestern
- Purdue—Illinois, Wisconsin
- Wisconsin—Northwestern, Purdue

== Standings ==
Team	Conference		Overall		Rank	
Team	Wins	Losses	Wins	Losses	AP	Coaches
Penn State	7	1	11	2	8	8
Ohio State	7	1	10	3	9	11
Michigan State	6	2	9	4	24	24
Northwestern	5	3	9	4	RV	RV
Iowa	5	3	9	4	20	20
Wisconsin	3	5	7	6		
Minnesota	3	5	7	6		
Illinois	3	5	5	7		
Purdue	2	6	4	8		
Michigan	2	6	3	9		
Indiana	1	7	3	9		

== Rankings ==
AP Poll	Pre	Wk 1	Wk 2	Wk 3	Wk 4	Wk 5	Wk 6	Wk 7	Wk 8	Wk 9	Wk 10	Wk 11	Wk 12	Wk 13	Wk 14	Wk 15	Final
Illinois	20	24T	24	22	22												
Indiana																	
Iowa																	20
Michigan	24																
Michigan State							23	20		22	18	18	17	22	21	19	24
Minnesota									25	20							
Northwestern														24	24	22	
Ohio State	2 (21)	3 (15)	5 (1)	13	14	14	12	12	10	13	12	10	10	10	10	10	9
Penn State	22	19	17	16	12	6	6	3	3	3	3 (6)	7	7	6	6	6	8
Purdue																	
Wisconsin	13	11	10	8	9	18											

== Schedule ==
- August 30:

Akron @ Wisconsin
Coastal Carolina @ Penn State
Maine @ Iowa
Syracuse @ Northwestern
Western Kentucky @ Indiana
Youngstown State @ Ohio State
Utah @ Michigan
Northern Illinois @ Minnesota
Michigan State @ California
Illinois @ Missouri

- September 6:

Eastern Illinois @ Illinois
Eastern Michigan @ Michigan State
Marshall @ Wisconsin
Miami (Ohio) @ Michigan
Northern Colorado @ Purdue
Ohio @ Ohio State
Florida International @ Iowa
Oregon State @ Penn State
Murray State @ Indiana
Northwestern @ Duke
Minnesota @ Bowling Green

- September 13:

Florida Atlantic @ Michigan State
Louisiana @ Illinois
Montana State @ Minnesota
Southern Illinois @ Northwestern
Iowa State @ Iowa
Oregon @ Purdue
Penn State @ Syracuse
Michigan @ Notre Dame
Ohio State @ Southern California
Wisconsin @ Fresno State

- September 20:

Central Michigan @ Purdue
Florida Atlantic @ Minnesota
Iowa @ Pittsburgh
Ohio @ Northwestern
Temple @ Penn State
Troy @ Ohio State
Notre Dame @ Michigan State
Ball State @ Indiana

- September 27:

Michigan State @ Indiana
Minnesota @ Ohio State
Northwestern @ Iowa
Purdue @ Notre Dame
Wisconsin @ Michigan
Illinois @ Penn State

- October 4:

Indiana @ Minnesota
Iowa @ Michigan State
Penn State @ Purdue
Illinois @ Michigan
Ohio State @ Wisconsin

- October 11:

Iowa @ Indiana
Minnesota @ Illinois
Toledo @ Michigan
Michigan State @ Northwestern
Purdue @ Ohio State
Penn State @ Wisconsin

- October 18:

Purdue @ Northwestern
Wisconsin @ Iowa
Ohio State @ Michigan State
Michigan @ Penn State
Indiana @ Illinois

- October 25:

Illinois @ Wisconsin
Minnesota @ Purdue
Northwestern @ Indiana
Penn State @ Ohio State
Michigan State @ Michigan

- November 1:

Northwestern @ Minnesota
Central Michigan @ Indiana
Iowa @ Illinois
Michigan @ Purdue
Wisconsin @ Michigan State

- November 8:

Illinois @ Western Michigan
Michigan @ Minnesota
Ohio State @ Northwestern
Penn State @ Iowa
Purdue @ Michigan State
Wisconsin @ Indiana

- November 15:

Indiana @ Penn State
Minnesota @ Wisconsin
Northwestern @ Michigan
Ohio State @ Illinois
Purdue @ Iowa

- November 22:

Iowa @ Minnesota
Cal Poly @ Wisconsin
Illinois @ Northwestern
Indiana @ Purdue
Michigan @ Ohio State
Michigan State @ Penn State

== Key matchups ==
Date	Visitor	Home	Significance
August 30	Michigan State 31	California 38	In the first matchup between these two teams since 2002, the Cal Bears handed the Spartans their 8th consecutive loss by seven points or less.
August 30	Utah 25	Michigan 23	In Michigan head coach Rich Rodriguez's first game for the Wolverines, the Utes beat Michigan to sustain their position as the non-BCS team with the most victories against BCS teams (14).
August 30	Illinois 42	Missouri 52	This is the first time that both teams were ranked when they went against each other. Missouri's win over the Fighting Illini drops Illinois's record to 7–15 in the Arch Rivalry. The Tigers have also won the past four games against Illinois.
August 30	Syracuse 10	Northwestern 30	Northwestern's win over Syracuse is the first non-conference BCS win since 2004. The Wildcats also won their fourth-straight season opening game.
September 6	Oregon State 14	Penn State 45	The Nittany Lions improved their all-time record against Pac-10 teams to 23-11. This also marks Penn State's tenth consecutive win against a non-conference team and seventh against a Pac-10 team at home. With the loss, it dropped Oregon State's record against the Big Ten to 0–2.
September 6	Northwestern 24	Duke 20	In the only Big Ten-ACC season matchup in the 2008 season, Northwestern avenged a 2007 home loss that snapped Duke's 22-game losing streak. This also improved the Wildcats' record in Durham to 5-3.
September 13	Michigan 17	Notre Dame 35	In a rainy matchup between the two winningest programs in the FBS, the Irish forced six turnovers to avenge two blowout losses by Michigan the last 2 seasons.
September 13	Penn State 55	Syracuse 13	The first game since 1990 between these two teams was dominated by the Nittany Lions. Penn State outgained Syracuse 560-169 and allowed only eight first downs in the entire game.
September 13	Iowa State 5	Iowa 17	In this annual matchup for the Cy-Hawk Trophy, the Iowa defense held the Cyclones to only 3 points despite Iowa State's offense being within the Hawkeye 30-yard line six times. With the win, Iowa has won the trophy 21 times over Iowa State's 11.
September 13	Oregon 32	Purdue 26	This Big Ten-Pac-10 game played in West Lafayette, Indiana, #16 Oregon needed two overtimes to put upset-minded Purdue away. Purdue also snapped a 13-game home win streak in August/September and with Oregon's win, the Boilermakers lost 15 straight games vs. ranked opponents, with its last win vs. Iowa in 2003.
September 13	Ohio State 3	USC 35	These teams that have combined for three BCS championships and five BCS National Championship game appearances saw USC dominate the Buckeyes in the Coliseum by holding Ohio State to only 3 points. The Buckeyes had a streak of 141 consecutive games scoring at least one touchdown snapped. The last time Ohio State was kept out of the end zone was against Michigan November 23, 1996, in a 13-9 loss.
September 20	Notre Dame 7	Michigan State 23	Playing for the Megaphone Trophy, neither of these teams had won at home since 2001. This year proved different as MSU defeated Notre Dame in East Lansing. The Spartans were led by Javon Ringer's 201 yards on the ground in the win against the Irish.
September 20	Iowa 20	Pitt 21	In this Big Ten-Big East matchup is the first game between these teams since 1952, the Hawkeyes had more total yards than the Panthers (361-259), but went home with a loss after not allowing a touchdown in the first three games of the 2008 season.
September 27	Michigan State 42	Indiana 29	In the Big Ten conference opener for both teams, the Old Brass Spittoon remained in East Lansing after Michigan State Running Back Javon Ringer, who had rushed for 200 yards in two straight games, ran just 2 yards shy of making a third straight 200 yard game.
September 27	Purdue 21	Notre Dame 38	In the only nonconference matchup of the week, the Shillelagh Trophy was returned to South Bend after the Irish avenged a 2007 loss in Ross–Ade Stadium. Purdue has also lost 15 of its last 16 games at Notre Dame Stadium dating back to 1976.
October 18	Michigan 17	Penn State 46	The Nittany Lions received their first win against the Wolverines since 1996 and avenged a nine-game losing streak to Michigan.
October 18	Wisconsin 16	Iowa 38	In another Big Ten traveling trophy game, the Hawkeyes returned the Heartland Trophy to Iowa City, Iowa, after a two-year losing streak against the Badgers. Wisconsin also dropped to 0-4 in the Big Ten for the first time since the 1996 season.
October 25	Michigan State 35	Michigan 21	This intrastate rivalry intensified in the 2007 season when Wolverine player Mike Hart dubbed the Spartans as Michigan's little brother. The Spartans returned the Paul Bunyan Trophy to East Lansing which was in the Wolverines' possession since 2002. It also marked the first time Michigan State won in Michigan Stadium since 1990.
October 25	Penn State 13	Ohio State 6	This rivalry matchup was again the featured point of College Gameday of the week for the 4th straight year. In front of an Ohio Stadium record crowd of 105,711, the Nittany Lions won their first game in Columbus since 1978. With Penn State's win, the all-time series is tied at 12-12. Ohio State dropped only its third Big Ten game since the 2005 season.
November 8	Michigan 29	Minnesota 6	The second oldest traveling trophy in the nation was up for grabs in this matchup between the Golden Gophers and Wolverines. The Little Brown Jug was won again by Michigan for the past nineteen of the last twenty times. Michigan also won its 12th straight win in the Metrodome and stopped a five-game losing streak.
November 15	Minnesota 32	Wisconsin 35	The oldest matchup in the FBS saw Minnesota with a two-touchdown lead at halftime in Camp Randall Stadium. Wisconsin, however, capped a second-half rally with a pair of safeties and a touchdown off a Minnesota turnover in the fourth quarter to win the matchup. The Badgers have won the last five matchups against the Gophers to keep Paul Bunyan's Axe in Madison.
November 15	Ohio State 30	Illinois 20	The Buckeyes avenged their 2007 loss against the Illini when Ohio State was ranked 1st in the polls. Ohio State ran its consecutive Big Ten road win to 15 and also returned the Illibuck to Columbus with Ohio State holding a 57-23 advantage over Illinois.
November 22	Michigan 7	Ohio State 42	The Michigan-Ohio State rivalry is one of the greatest sports rivalries. This annual matchup as the last regular season game has decided 24 Big Ten championships including this season's matchup. The Buckeyes won their fifth straight game against the Wolverines and continued their home winning streak against Michigan to 4. Ohio State clinched a share of a 4th straight Big Ten championship after beating Michigan. The Wolverines have not won since the 100th matchup between the archrivals in 2003.
November 22	Michigan State 18	Penn State 49	In this snowy matchup, Penn State returned the Land Grant Trophy to Happy Valley after avenging a 2007 season loss to the Spartans. Penn State increased its record against the Spartans to 12-4 since 1993. Penn State clinched a share of the Big Ten championship with a win over Michigan State and also a Rose Bowl berth for the first time since the 1994 season after beating Ohio State earlier in this season. The win also marked the 800th win in school history which is only the 6th team in the FBS and 3rd from the Big Ten to do so.
November 22	Iowa 55	Minnesota 0	The Floyd of Rosedale stayed with the Hawkeyes after a dominating win by Iowa. Shonn Greene set the Iowa single-season rushing record with 1,729 yards breaking Tavian Banks' record set in 1997. It was Minnesota's final time playing its home games in the Metrodome as the school moves into TCF Bank Stadium next season.
November 22	Illinois 10	Northwestern 27	This was the last battle for the Sweet Sioux Tomahawk, which the schools agreed to retire after the NCAA declared it to be abusive to Native Americans. While the schools had agreed that Northwestern would be the trophy's final resting place regardless of the game result, the Wildcats won the trophy on the field, making it five wins in the last six matchups. The win for Northwestern meant a nine win season for only the fifth time in school history. It also knocked Illinois out of a bowl game after making it to the 2008 Rose Bowl.
November 22	Indiana 10	Purdue 62	In Purdue Head Coach Joe Tiller's final game, the Old Oaken Bucket was returned to the Boilermakers after their performance against the Hoosiers. This was also the most lopsided game in the series between these two teams since 1893.

== Spring games ==
=== April 12 ===
- Michigan

=== April 19 ===
- Illinois
- Indiana
- Iowa
- Michigan State
- Ohio State
- Penn State
- Purdue
- Wisconsin

=== April 25 ===
- Minnesota

=== April 26 ===
- Northwestern

== Homecoming games ==
=== September 27 ===
- Northwestern 22, Iowa 17

=== October 4 ===
- Michigan State 16, Iowa 13
- Illinois 45, Michigan 20

=== October 11 ===
- Minnesota 27, Illinois 20

=== October 18 ===
- Northwestern 48, Purdue 26
- Penn State 46, Michigan 17

=== October 25 ===
- Indiana 21, Northwestern 19
- Minnesota 17, Purdue 6
- Wisconsin 27, Illinois 17
- Penn State 13, Ohio State 6

=== November 1 ===
- Northwestern 24, Minnesota 17

== Statistical leaders ==
=== Team ===
Scoring Offense
Team	G	PTS	AVG
Penn State	12	482	40.2
Iowa	12	396	30.3
Illinois	12	344	28.7
Wisconsin	12	344	28.7

Scoring Defense
Team	G	PTS	AVG
Penn State	12	149	12.4
Ohio State	12	157	13.1
Iowa	12	159	13.3
Northwestern	12	232	19.3

Passing Offense
Team	ATT	YDS	TD	YDS/G
Illinois	393	3,232	22	269.3
Purdue	502	2,995	16	249.6
Penn State	346	2,887	22	240.6
Minnesota	380	2,597	14	216.4

Rushing Offense
Team	ATT	YDS	TD	YDS/G
Wisconsin	529	2,544	31	212
Penn State	482	2,539	35	211.6
Ohio State	501	20	191.6	
Iowa	468	2,272	27	189.3

Total Offense
Team	RUSH	PASS	TOTAL	TD	YDS/G
Penn State	2,539	2,887	5,426	57	452.2
Illinois	2,034	3,232	5,266	39	438.8
Wisconsin	2,544	2,313	4,857	41	404.8
Purdue	1,498	2,995	4,493	35	374.4

Passing Defense
Team	ATT	YDS	TD	YDS/G
Ohio State	382	1,972	10	164.3
Penn State	364	2,016	6	168.0
Purdue	359	2,199	14	183.3
Wisconsin	367	2,269	13	189.1

Rushing Defense
Team	ATT	YDS	TD	YDS/G
Penn State	395	1,151	11	95.9
Iowa	383	1,179	7	98.3
Ohio State	377	1,379	6	114.9
Northwestern	424	1,532	15	127.7

Total Defense
Team	RUSH	PASS	TOTAL	TD	YDS/G
Penn State	1,151	2,016	3,167	17	263.9
Ohio State	1,379	1,972	3,351	16	279.3
Iowa	1,179	2,295	3,474	15	289.5
Wisconsin	1,599	2,269	3,868	34	322.3

3rd Downs
Team	CONV	ATT	PCT
Penn State	85	161	52.8
Northwestern	86	188	45.7
Ohio State	70	160	43.8
Illinois	67	162	41.4

Opp. 3rd Downs
Team	CONV	ATT	PCT
Penn State	53	172	30.8
Iowa	62	183	33.9
Northwestern	61	180	33.9
Ohio State	60	170	35.3

Red Zone Offense
Team	ATT	TD	FG	TOTAL	PCT
Ohio State	38	23	13	36	94.7
Penn State	61	41	16	57	93.4
Minnesota	37	24	9	33	89.2
Northwestern	51	27	18	45	86.5

Red Zone Defense
Team	ATT	TD	FG	TOTAL	PCT
Iowa	28	12	9	21	75
Northwestern	39	19	14	30	76.9
Michigan State	39	22	9	30	76.9
Purdue	47	24	13	37	78.7

Turnover Margin
Team	GAIN	LOSS	DIFF
Ohio State	28	13	+15
Minnesota	30	18	+12
Penn State	22	13	+9
Iowa	27	21	+6

Penalties
Team	NO.	YDS	AVG/G
Penn State	40	335	28
Iowa	47	396	33
Purdue	60	484	40.3
Michigan	57	500	41.7

=== Individual ===
Passing
Player	School	COMP	ATT	YDS	TD	INT	PASS EFF.
Juice Williams	Illinois	219	381	3,173	22	16	138.1
Adam Weber	Minnesota	236	376	2,585	14	8	128.6
Curtis Painter	Purdue	227	379	2,400	13	11	118.6
Daryll Clark	Penn State	171	285	2,319	17	4	145.2

Rushing
Player	School	ATT	YDS	YPC	TD
Shonn Greene	Iowa	278	1,729	6.2	17
Javon Ringer	Michigan State	370	1,590	4.3	21
Evan Royster	Penn State	185	1,202	6.5	12
Kory Sheets	Purdue	234	1,131	4.8	16

Receiving
Player	School	REC	YDS	YPC	TD
Arrelious Benn	Illinois	67	1,055	15.7	3
Eric Decker	Minnesota	76	925	12.2	6
Desmond Tardy	Purdue	67	876	13.1	5
Greg Orton	Purdue	69	720	10.4	5

Tackles
Player	School	SOLO	AST	TOTAL	AVG/G
Brit Miller	Illinois	72	60	132	11
James Laurinaitis	Ohio State	46	75	121	10.1
Greg Jones	Michigan State	72	43	115	9.6
Anthony Heygood	Purdue	65	49	114	9.5

Sacks
Player	School	SACKS	YARDS
Aaron Maybin	Penn State	12.0	78
Jammie Kirlew	Indiana	10.5	86
Brandon Graham	Michigan	10	64
William VanDeSteeg	Minnesota	9.5	69

Interceptions
Player	School	INT	YARDS	TD
Pat Angerer	Iowa	5	34	0
Otis Wiley	Michigan State	4	84	1
Kurt Coleman	Ohio State	4	18	0

Kick returns
Player	School	RET	YDS	TD	AVG	LONG
Desmond Tardy	Purdue	12	345	0	28.8	68
Derrick Williams	Penn State	18	486	2	27.0	94
Aaron Valentin	Purdue	16	411	0	25.7	64
Troy Stoudermire	Minnesota	36	909	0	25.2	58

Punt returns
Player	School	RET	YDS	TD	AVG	LONG
Ray Small	Ohio State	23	348	1	15.1	80
Marcus Sherels	Minnesota	14	174	0	12.4	34
Andy Brodell	Iowa	36	383	1	10.6	81
Otis Wiley	Michigan State	23	234	0	10.2	78

Kicking
Player	School	PAT	FG	PTS	PTS/G
Kevin Kelly	Penn State	57/57	19/23	114	9.5
Phillip Welch	Wisconsin	30/31	17/20	81	8.1
Brett Swenson	Michigan State	34/34	20/25	94	7.8

== All-Big Ten Conference Team ==
First Team Offense
Individual	Team	Position
Daryll Clark	Penn State	Quarterback
Shonn Greene	Iowa	Running Back
Javon Ringer	Michigan State	Running Back
Eric Decker	Minnesota	Receiver
Derrick Williams	Penn State	Receiver
A.Q. Shipley	Penn State	Center
Seth Olsen	Iowa	Guard
Rich Ohrnberger	Penn State	Guard
Alex Boone	Ohio State	Tackle
Gerald Cadogan	Penn State	Tackle
Brandon Myers	Iowa	Tight End
Kevin Kelly	Penn State	Kicker

First Team Defense
Individual	Team	Position
Mitch King	Iowa	Line
Corey Wootton	Northwestern	Line
Aaron Maybin	Penn State	Line
Jared Odrick	Penn State	Line
Greg Jones	Michigan State	Linebacker
James Laurinaitis	Ohio State	Linebacker
Navorro Bowman	Penn State	Linebacker
Vontae Davis	Illinois	Defensive Back
Otis Wiley	Michigan State	Defensive Back
Malcolm Jenkins	Ohio State	Defensive Back
Anthony Scirrotto	Penn State	Defensive Back
Zoltan Mesko	Michigan	Punter

== Awards ==
=== National awards ===
Doak Walker Award

- RB Shonn Greene, Iowa

Rimington Trophy

- C A.Q. Shipley, Penn State

Lott Trophy

- LB James Laurinaitis, Ohio State

Jim Thorpe Award

- CB Malcolm Jenkins, Ohio State

=== Conference honors ===
Big Ten Offensive Player of the Year

- RB Shonn Greene, Iowa

Big Ten Defensive Player of the Year

- LB James Laurinaitis, Ohio State

Big Ten Offensive Lineman of the Year

- C A.Q. Shipley, Penn State

Big Ten Defensive Lineman of the Year

- Mitch King, Iowa

Big Ten Freshman of the Year

- QB Terrelle Pryor, Ohio State

Dave McClain Coach of the Year (Big Ten Coach of the Year)

- Coach Joe Paterno, Penn State

== Bowl games ==
Bowl Game	Date	Stadium	City	Television	Conference Matchups	Payout (US$)
Insight Bowl	December 31, 2008	Sun Devil Stadium	Tempe, Arizona	NFL	Minnesota 21 vs. Kansas 42	$1.2 Million
Champs Sports Bowl	December 27, 2008	Citrus Bowl	Orlando, Florida	ESPN	Wisconsin 13 vs. Florida State 42	$2.25 Million
Alamo Bowl	December 29, 2008	Alamodome	San Antonio, Texas	ESPN	Northwestern 23 vs. Missouri 30	$2.2 Million
Outback Bowl	January 1, 2009	Raymond James Stadium	Tampa, Florida	ESPN	Iowa 31 vs. South Carolina 10	$3 Million
Capital One	January 1, 2009	Citrus Bowl	Orlando, Florida	ABC	Michigan State 12 vs. Georgia 24	$4.25 Million
Fiesta Bowl	January 5, 2009	University of Phoenix Stadium	Glendale, Arizona	Fox	Ohio State 21 vs. Texas 24	$17.5 Million
Rose Bowl	January 1, 2009	Rose Bowl	Pasadena, California	ABC	Penn State 24 vs. USC 38	$18 Million

== Attendance ==
The overall attendance for the Big Ten was a total of 5,399,659 fans attending 77 contests this year. This meant that conference schools averaged 70,125 fans per home contest this season. Each Big Ten team has seven home games during the season with two exceptions; Indiana played eight games in Memorial Stadium and Illinois played two neutral sites to limit the Illini to six games in Memorial Stadium. Below are the figures for each game, the total for the team's season and the average attendance per game. The rankings below are by average attendance per game.

Team	Game 1	Game 2	Game 3	Game 4	Game 5	Game 6	Game 7	Game 8	Total	Average
Michigan	108,421	106,724	109,833	109,750	107,267	110,146	107,856	---	759,997	108,571
Penn State	106,577	108,159	105,106	109,626	110,017	108,445	109,845	---	757,775	108,253
Ohio State	105,011	105,002	102,989	105,175	105,378	105,711*	105,564	---	734,830	104,975
Wisconsin	80,910	80,396	81,608	81,524	81,241	81,228	80,709	---	567,616	81,088
Michigan State	71,789	70,321	76,366	77,526	77,360	75,121	75,522	---	524,005	74,857
Iowa	70,585	70,585	70,585	70,585	70,585	70,585	67,676	---	491,186	70,169
Illinois	60,131	58,632	62,870	62,870	62,870	62,870	---	---	370,243	61,707
Purdue	51,476	54,666	57,101	57,215	54,215	59,135	63,107	---	396,915	56,702
Minnesota	44,029	43,929	41,003	40,511	54,122	55,040	64,071	---	342,705	48,957
Indiana	30,067	30,123	41,349	31,832	33,428	30,698	26,140	30,618	254,255	31,781
Northwestern	20,015	19,062	22,069	32,527	27,163	47,130	32,166	---	200,132	28,590

* denotes Ohio Stadium record vs. Penn State on October 25.
