= 2008 Purdue Boilermakers football team =

American college football season

2008 Purdue Boilermakers football
- Conference: Big Ten Conference
- Record: 4–8 (2–6 Big Ten)
- Head coach: Joe Tiller (12th season)
- Offensive coordinator: Ed Zaunbrecher (3rd season)
- Offensive scheme: One-back shotgun spread
- Defensive coordinator: Brock Spack (12th season)
- Base defense: 4–3
- Captains: Ryan Baker; Jermaine Guynn; Curtis Painter; Joe Whitest
- Home stadium: Ross–Ade Stadium (Capacity: 62,500)

2008 Big Ten Conference football standings
	Conf.			Overall
Team	W		L	W		L
No. 8 Penn State $+	7	–	1	11	–	2
No. 9 Ohio State %+	7	–	1	10	–	3
No. 24 Michigan State	6	–	2	9	–	4
Northwestern	5	–	3	9	–	4
No. 20 Iowa	5	–	3	9	–	4
Wisconsin	3	–	5	7	–	6
Minnesota	3	–	5	7	–	6
Illinois	3	–	5	5	–	7
Purdue	2	–	6	4	–	8
Michigan	2	–	6	3	–	9
Indiana	1	–	7	3	–	9
$ – BCS representative as conference champion; % – BCS at-large representative; + – Conference co-champions; Rankings from AP Poll

The 2008 Purdue Boilermakers football team represented Purdue University in the Big Ten Conference during the 2008 NCAA Division I FBS football season. Joe Tiller, in his 12th and final season at Purdue, was the team's head coach. The Boilermakers' home games were played at Ross–Ade Stadium in West Lafayette, Indiana. They posted a 4–8 record, finishing in a ninth place tie in the Big Ten.

== Schedule ==
Date	Time	Opponent	Site	TV	Result	Attendance
September 6	12:00 pm	Northern Colorado*	Ross–Ade Stadium; West Lafayette, IN	BTN	W 42–10	51,476
September 13	3:30 pm	No. 16 Oregon*	Ross–Ade Stadium; West Lafayette, IN	ABC/ESPN2	L 26–32 ^{2OT}	54,666
September 20	12:00 pm	Central Michigan*	Ross–Ade Stadium; West Lafayette, IN	BTN	W 32–25	57,101
September 27	3:30 pm	at Notre Dame*	Notre Dame Stadium; Notre Dame, IN (Shillelagh Trophy)	NBC	L 21–38	80,795
October 4	12:00 pm	No. 6 Penn State	Ross–Ade Stadium; West Lafayette, IN	ESPN	L 6–20	57,215
October 11	3:30 pm	at No. 12 Ohio State	Ohio Stadium; Columbus, OH	ABC/ESPN	L 3–16	105,378
October 18	12:00 pm	at Northwestern	Ryan Field; Evanston, IL	ESPN2	L 26–48	27,163
October 25	12:00 pm	No. 25 Minnesota^{†}	Ross–Ade Stadium; West Lafayette, IN	ESPNC	L 6–17	54,215
November 1	12:00 pm	Michigan	Ross–Ade Stadium; West Lafayette, IN	BTN	W 48–42	59,135
November 8	12:00 pm	at No. 18 Michigan State	Spartan Stadium; East Lansing, MI	BTN	L 7–21	75,522
November 15	12:00 pm	at Iowa	Kinnick Stadium; Iowa City, IA	BTN	L 17–22	67,676
November 22	12:00 pm	Indiana	Ross–Ade Stadium; West Lafayette, IN (Old Oaken Bucket)	ESPN2	W 62–10	63,107
*Non-conference game; ^{†}Homecoming; Rankings from AP Poll released prior to the game; All times are in Eastern time

== Game summaries ==
=== Northern Colorado ===
Team	1	2	3	4	Total
Northern Colorado	0	0	0	10	10
• Purdue	7	7	7	21	42

- Date: September 6
- Location: Ross–Ade Stadium, West Lafayette, IN
- Game start: 12:00 p.m. EDT
- Elapsed time: 3:12
- Game attendance: 51,476
- Referee: Ron Torbert
- TV announcers (BTN): Matt Rosen (Play-by-play), Ian Allen (Color) & Rebecca Haarlow (Sideline)

=== Oregon ===
Team	1	2	3	4	OT	2OT	Total
• Oregon	3	3	14	3	3	6	32
Purdue	13	7	0	3	3	0	26

- Date: September 13
- Location: Ross–Ade Stadium, West Lafayette, IN
- Game start: 3:30 p.m. EDT
- Elapsed time: 3:50
- Game attendance: 54,666
- Referee: Dave Witvoet
- TV announcers (ABC/ESPN2): Brad Nessler (Play-by-play), Bob Griese (Color), Paul Maguire (Color) & Stacey Dales (Sideline)

Kory Sheets rushed for an 80-yard touchdown for the Boilermakers and Matt Evensen kicked a 23-yard field goal for the Ducks. Chris Summers then kicked a 29-yard and a 38-yard field goals in the first quarter. Kory Sheets rush for 2 yards for a touchdown in the second quarter.

In the third quarter, Summers' punt was returned by Jairus Byrd for an 87-yard touchdown. Then LeGarrette Blount rushed for 5 yards for a touchdown to tie the score. Summers kicked a 27-yard field goal in the fourth quarter, but missed a field goal try to tie the game in regulation.

Both teams kicked a field goal in overtime, but the Boilermakers failed to score in the second overtime period. The Ducks scored a touchdown to win the game.

=== Central Michigan ===
Team	1	2	3	4	Total
Central Michigan	7	3	0	15	25
• Purdue	3	7	7	15	32

- Date: September 20
- Location: Ross–Ade Stadium, West Lafayette, IN
- Game start: 12:00 p.m. EST
- Elapsed time: 3:20
- Game attendance: 57,101
- Referee: Todd Gerrlings
- TV announcers (BTN): Matt Devlin (Play-by-play), Ian Allen (Color) & Elizabeth Moreau (Sideline)

=== Notre Dame ===
Team	1	2	3	4	Total
Purdue	7	7	7	0	21
• Notre Dame	0	14	21	3	38

- Date: September 27
- Location: Notre Dame Stadium, Notre Dame, IN
- Game start: 3:30 p.m. EST
- Elapsed time: 3:21
- Game attendance: 80,795
- Referee: Bill LeMonnier
- TV announcers (NBC): Tom Hammond (Play-by-play), Pat Haden (Color) & Alex Flanagan (Sideline)

Irish quarterback Jimmy Clausen threw for a career-high 275 yards and three touchdowns and Notre Dame running backs ran for 201 yards in the 38–21 defeat over the Boilermakers. Purdue took a 7–0 lead on a Kory Sheets run, but Notre Dame countered with a 47-yard interception return for a touchdown by cornerback Robert J. Blanton. Purdue answered back when Aaron Valentin scored on a 3-yard pass from Curtis Painter to make the score 14–7. Clausen threw a touchdown pass to Golden Tate to tie it 14–14 heading into half-time.

The Irish scored on their first two possessions of the second half to open a 28–14 lead. The Boilermakers cut the lead to 28–21 four plays later when Painter threw a pass that Desmond Tardy caught at the Notre Dame 30 and raced up the left sideline for a touchdown. The Irish answered immediately, however, when Clausen threw a 30-yard TD pass to David Grimes on a fourth-and-7. The Boilermakers fell to 1–15 at Notre Dame Stadium since 1976. The loss also left Joe Tiller with a 5–7 record against the Irish. (Purdue had lost 11 straight to Notre Dame before Tiller arrived.)

=== Penn State ===
Team	1	2	3	4	Total
• Penn State	0	10	7	3	20
Purdue	0	0	0	6	6

- Date: October 4
- Location: Ross–Ade Stadium, West Lafayette, IN
- Game start: 12:00 p.m. EDT
- Elapsed time: 2:49
- Game attendance: 57,215
- Referee: Dan Capron
- TV announcers (ESPN): Dave Pasch (Play-by-play), Andre Ware (Color) & Erin Andrews (Sideline)

The Nittany Lions defeated the Boilermakers 20–6, outgaining Purdue 422 to 241 in total offense.

Penn State quarterback Daryll Clark completed 18 of 26 passes for 226 yards and a ran for a touchdown on a quarterback sneak on 4th-and-goal in the second quarter for the first points of the game. Running back Evan Royster ran for 141 yards and a touchdown and also caught four balls for 53 yards.

Curtis Painter finished 13-for-22 for 112 yards but was replaced in the fourth quarter by backup Joey Elliott after throwing an interception to Nittany Lion safety Drew Astorino. Placekicker Chris Summers missed all three of his kick attempts—two field goal attempts and an extra point attempt. Kory Sheets' fourth-quarter touchdown run was Purdue's first offensive touchdown against Penn State since 2005.

=== Ohio State ===
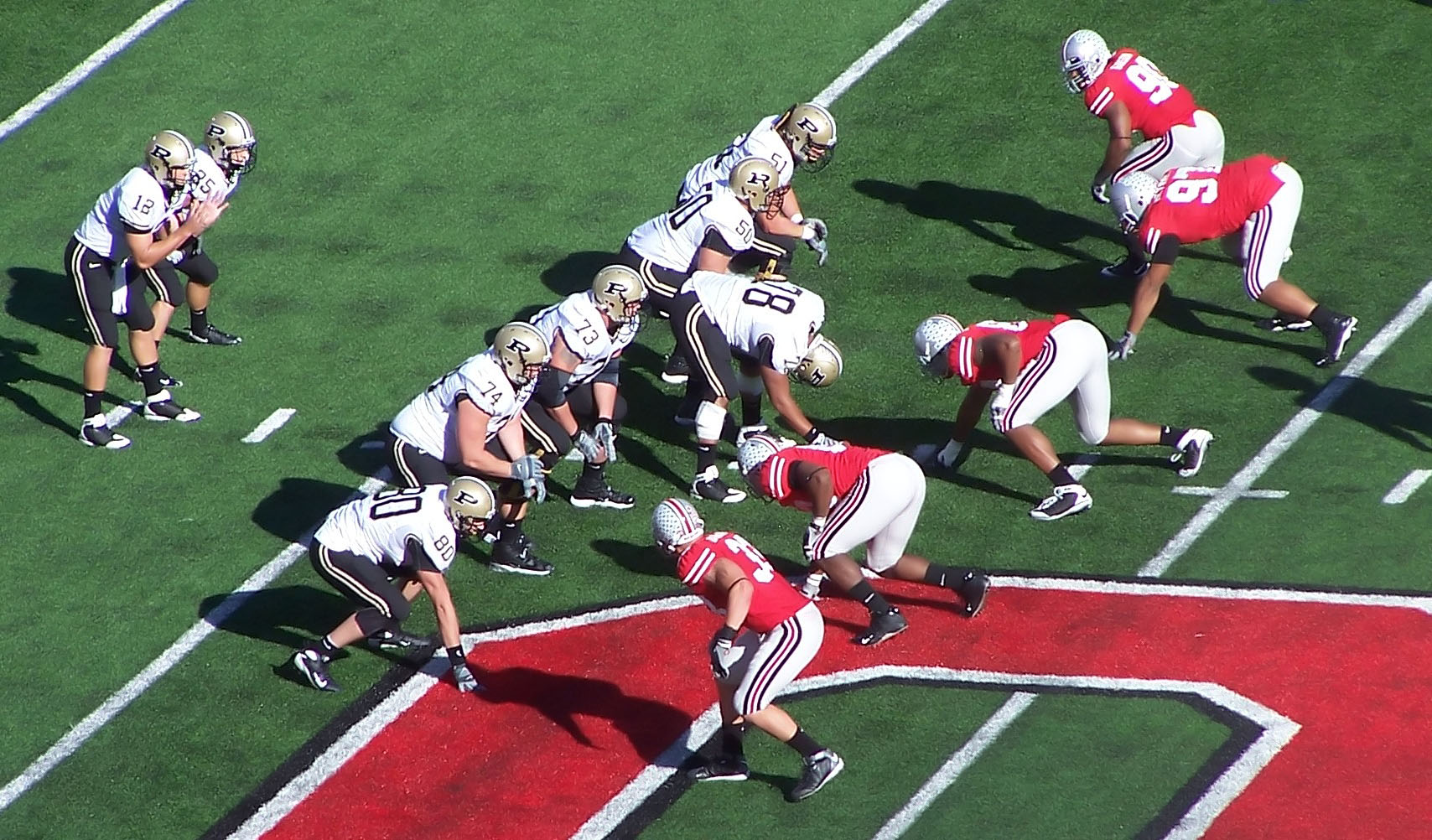
Purdue on offense against OSU

Team	1	2	3	4	Total
Purdue	0	0	3	0	3
• Ohio State	10	3	0	3	16

- Date: October 11
- Location: Ohio Stadium, Columbus, OH
- Game start: 3:30 p.m. EDT
- Elapsed time: 3:01
- Game attendance: 105,378
- Referee: Dennis Lipski
- TV announcers (ABC/ESPN): Ron Franklin (Play-by-play), Ed Cunningham (Color) & Jack Arute (Sideline)

Purdue managed to keep Ohio State's offense out of the end zone with OSU's only touchdown coming from a blocked punt. While the Purdue defense shut down Ohio State's Terelle Pryor and Beanie Wells, Ohio State's defense shut down Purdue's high powered offense. Purdue did manage to cut the lead to 13–3 in the third, but an Ohio State field goal restored the lead to 13. Ohio State stopped a late Purdue chance to make things interesting to hold on for the win.

=== Northwestern ===
Team	1	2	3	4	Total
Purdue	6	6	0	14	26
• Northwestern	0	24	10	14	48

- Date: October 18
- Location: Ryan Field, Evanston, IL
- Game start: 12:00 p.m. EDT
- Elapsed time: 3:28
- Game attendance: 27,163
- Referee: Dave Witvoet
- TV announcers (ESPN2): Pam Ward (Play-by-play) & Ray Bentley (Color)

=== Minnesota ===
Team	1	2	3	4	Total
• Minnesota	7	3	0	7	17
Purdue	6	0	0	0	6

- Date: October 25
- Location: Ross–Ade Stadium, West Lafayette, IN
- Game start: 12:00 p.m. EDT
- Elapsed time: 3:01
- Game attendance: 54,215
- Referee: Bill LeMonnier
- TV announcers (ESPNC): Bob Wischusen (Play-by-play) & Brock Huard (Color)

=== Michigan ===
Team	1	2	3	4	Total
Michigan	14	14	0	14	42
• Purdue	14	7	14	13	48

- Date: November 1
- Location: Ross–Ade Stadium, West Lafayette, IN
- Game start: 12:00 p.m. EDT
- Elapsed time: 3:22
- Game attendance: 59,135
- Referee: Dan Capron
- TV announcers (BTN): Wayne Larrivee (Play-by-play), Charles Davis (Color) & Charissa Thompson (Sideline)

Scoring summary
1	12:13	Michigan	Brandon Minor 45-yard run (K.C. Lopata kick)	Michigan 7–0
1	9:56	Michigan	Martavious Odoms 73-yard punt return (K.C. Lopata kick)	Michigan 14–0
1	5:42	Purdue	Kory Sheets 2-yard run (Carson Wiggs kick)	Michigan 14–7
1	1:06	Purdue	Justin Siller 10-yard run (Carson Wiggs kick)	Tied 14–14
2	12:28	Michigan	LaTerryal Savoy 11-yard pass from Steven Threet (K.C. Lopata kick)	Michigan 21–14
2	5:29	Michigan	Darryl Stonum 51-yard pass from Steven Threet (K.C. Lopata kick)	Michigan 28–14
2	0:35	Purdue	Kory Sheets 3-yard run (Carson Wiggs kick)	Michigan 28–21
3	10:21	Purdue	Kory Sheets 7-yard pass from Justin Siller (Carson Wiggs kick)	Tie 28–28
3	0:04	Purdue	Kory Sheets 5-yard run (Carson Wiggs kick)	Purdue 35–28
4	12:19	Michigan	Brandon Minor 12-yard run (K.C. Lopata kick)	Tie 35–35
4	7:14	Purdue	Greg Orton 4-yard pass from Justin Siller (Carson Wiggs kick)	Purdue 42–35
4	1:20	Michigan	Brandon Minor 1-yard run (K.C. Lopata kick)	Tie 42–42
4	0:26	Purdue	Desmond Tardy 28-yard pass from Justin Siller (kick blocked)	Purdue 48–42

In his first collegiate start, third-string quarterback Justin Siller completed 21-of-34 passes for 266 yards and three touchdowns while rushing for 77 yards and another score. Kory Sheets rushed for 118 yards and tied a career-high with four touchdowns.

=== Michigan State ===
Team	1	2	3	4	Total
Purdue	0	0	0	7	7
• Michigan State	7	7	7	0	21

- Date: November 8
- Location: Spartans Stadium, East Lansing, MI
- Game start: 12:00 p.m. EST
- Elapsed time: 3:09
- Game attendance: 75,522
- Referee: Dennis Lipski
- TV announcers (BTN): Wayne Larrivee (Play-by-play), Charles Davis (Color) & Charissa Thompson (Sideline)

=== Iowa ===
Team	1	2	3	4	Total
Purdue	0	10	0	7	17
• Iowa	6	6	3	7	22

- Date: November 15
- Location: Kinnick Stadium, Iowa City, IA
- Game start: 12:00 p.m. EST
- Elapsed time: 3:00
- Game attendance: 67,676
- Referee: John O'Neill
- TV announcers (BTN): Thom Brennaman (Play-by-play), Chris Martin (Color) & Anthony Herron (Sideline)

=== Indiana ===
Team	1	2	3	4	Total
Indiana	0	3	0	7	10
• Purdue	24	17	14	7	62

- Date: November 22
- Location: Ross–Ade Stadium, West Lafayette, IN
- Game start: 12:00 p.m. EST
- Elapsed time: 3:06
- Game attendance: 63,107
- Referee: Dan Capron
- TV announcers (ESPN2): Pam Ward (Play-by-play) & Ray Bentley (Color)

Scoring summary
1	12:56	Purdue	Desmond Tardy 9-yard pass from Curtis Painter (Carson Wiggs kick)	Purdue 7–0
1	8:56	Purdue	Aaron Valentin 79-yard pass from Curtis Painter (Carson Wiggs kick)	Purdue 14–0
1	6:06	Purdue	Carson Wiggs 24-yard field goal	Purdue 17–0
1	3:31	Purdue	Brandon Whittington 5-yard pass from Curtis Painter (Carson Wiggs kick)	Purdue 24–0
2	11:57	Purdue	Kory Sheets 1-yard run (Carson Wiggs kick)	Purdue 31–0
2	4:35	Purdue	Carson Wiggs 38-yard field goal	Purdue 34–0
2	2:49	Indiana	Austin Starr 27-yard field goal	Purdue 34–3
2	0:59	Purdue	Kory Sheets 4-yard run (Carson Wiggs kick)	Purdue 41–3
3	10:25	Purdue	Greg Orton 6-yard pass from Curtis Painter (Carson Wiggs kick)	Purdue 48–3
3	3:46	Purdue	Kory Sheets 17-yard run (Carson Wiggs kick)	Purdue 55–3
4	14:52	Indiana	Ray Fisher 16-yard pass from Kellen Lewis (Austin Starr kick)	Purdue 55–10
4	10:20	Purdue	Keith Smith 18-yard pass from Curtis Painter (Carson Wiggs kick)	Purdue 62–10

To finish a mostly dismal season for Purdue, the Boilermakers blew out arch-rival Indiana to reclaim the Old Oaken Bucket in Joe Tiller's final game. The win produced the largest ever margin of victory in the Bucket series.

== Statistics ==
=== Team ===
	Team	Opp
Scoring	296	301
Points per Game	24.7	25.1
First Downs	254	230
Rushing	93	116
Passing	139	97
Penalty	23	17
Total offense	4493	4297
Avg per Play	5.0	5.2
Avg per Game	374.4	358.1
Fumbles-Lost	12–10	20–10
Penalties-Yards	60–484	76–603
Avg per Game	40.3	50.2

	Team	Opp
Punts-Yards	57-2106	55-2097
Avg per Punt	36.9	38.1
Time of Possession/Game	29:58	30:02
3rd Down Conversions	71/184	60/169
4th Down Conversions	15/29	10/21
Touchdowns Scored	37	36
Field Goals-Attempts-Long	13–21–53	17–25–49
PAT-Attempts	33–36	32–34
Attendance	396,915	356,534
Games/Avg per Game	7/56,702	5/71,307

==== Scores by quarter ====
	1	2	3	4	OT	Total
Purdue	80	68	52	93	3	296
Opponents	54	90	62	86	9	301

=== Offense ===
==== Rushing ====
Name	GP-GS	Att	Gain	Loss	Net	Avg	TD	Long	Avg/G
Kory Sheets	12	234	1185	54	1131	4.8	16	80	94.2
Justin Siller	9	60	240	73	167	2.8	2	20	18.6
Anthony Heygood	12	1	61	0	61	61.0	0	61	5.1
Frank Halliburton	11	13	39	2	37	2.8	0	12	3.4
Dan Dierking	12	9	34	0	34	3.8	0	13	2.8
Ralph Bolden	8	16	31	3	28	1.8	0	9	3.5
Joey Elliott	3	7	26	13	13	1.9	1	7	4.3
Curtis Painter	10	44	120	110	10	0.2	0	19	1.0
Desmond Tardy	12	5	14	5	9	1.8	0	8	0.8
Chris Bennett	1	1	6	0	6	6.0	0	6	6.0
Keith Smith	12	1	4	0	4	4.0	0	4	0.3
Team	9	1	0	2	−2	−2.0	0	0	−0.2
Total	12	392	1760	262	1498	3.8	19	80	124.8
Opponents	12	466	2378	280	2098	4.4	17	75	174.8

==== Passing ====
Name	GP-GS	Effic	Att-Cmp-Int	Pct	Yds	TD	Lng	Avg/G
Curtis Painter	10	118.6	379–227–11	59.9	2400	13	79	240.0
Justin Siller	9	100.5	106–59–2	55.7	496	3	35	55.1
Joey Elliott	3	98.7	15–8–0	53.3	81	0	21	27.0
Desmond Tardy	12	125.6	2–1–0	50.0	18	0	18	1.5
Team								
Total	12	114.2	502–295–13	58.8	2995	16	79	249.6
Opponents	12	115.0	359–202–10	56.3	2199	14	71	183.2

==== Receiving ====
Name	GP-GS	No.	Yds	Avg	TD	Long	Avg/G
Greg Orton	12	69	720	10.4	5	43	60.0
Desmond Tardy	12	67	876	13.1	5	60	73.0
Keith Smith	12	49	486	9.9	2	31	40.5
Kory Sheets	12	37	253	6.8	1	25	21.1
Brandon Whittington	12	25	182	7.3	1	14	15.2
Jake Wasikowski	12	13	89	6.8	0	18	7.4
Aaron Valentin	12	11	224	20.4	2	79	18.7
Joe Whitest	10	7	59	8.4	0	16	5.9
Ralph Bolden	8	3	18	6.0	0	10	2.2
Arsenio Curry	9	2	18	9.0	0	9	2.0
Roberto Mcbean	12	2	16	8.0	0	13	1.3
Waynelle Gravesande	1	2	13	6.5	0	8	13.0
Colton McKey	10	2	9	4.5	0	6	0.9
Frank Halliburton	11	2	8	4.0	0	7	0.7
Curtis Painter	10	1	18	18.0	0	18	1.8
Jeff Lindsay	12	1	8	8.0	0	8	0.7
Dan Dierking	12	1	2	2.0	0	2	0.2
Jared Zwilling	7	1	−4	−4.0	0	0	−0.6
Total	12	295	2995	10.2	16	79	249.6
Opponents	12	202	2199	10.9	14	71	183.2

=== Defense ===
Name	GP	Tackles				Sacks	Pass defense		Interceptions				Fumbles		Blkd Kick
Name	GP	Solo	Ast	Total	TFL-Yds	No-Yds	BrUp	QBH	No.-Yds	Avg	TD	Long	Rcv-Yds	FF	Blkd Kick
Anthony Heygood	12	65	49	114	6.0–17	–	3	–	1–2	2.0	0	2	1–0	1	–
Torri Williams	12	54	29	83	0.5–1	–	6	–	2–29	14.5	0	29	1–0	2	–
Joe Holland	12	36	40	76	2.0–5	1.0–2	4	–	–	–	–	–	–	–	–
Ryan Kerrigan	12	31	25	56	11.5–49	7.0–40	4	–	1–8	8.0	0	–	–	2	–
Brandon King	12	24	24	48	2.0–7	–	9	–	1–60	60.0	0	60	1–0	1	–
Frank Duong	9	30	11	41	2.0–8	–	2	–	1–58	58.0	1	58	1–0	2	–
Chris Carlino	12	12	24	36	0.5–2	–	–	–	–	–	–	–	1–0	–	–
Dwight McLean	12	22	14	36	0.5–2	–	3	–	2–16	8.0	0	14	1–0	–	–
Mike Neal	12	18	15	33	10.0–51	5.5–39	–	–	–	–	–	–	–	–	–
David Pender	12	24	8	32	1.0–2	–	12	–	1–0	0.0	0	–	–	–	–
Ryan Baker	12	21	10	31	11.0–26	1.5–6	–	–	1–4	4.0	0	–	1–0	–	–
Alex Magee	12	14	14	28	6.0–29	3.5–18	–	–	–	–	–	–	1–0	1	–
Royce Adams	12	15	3	18	1.0–1	–	–	–	–	–	–	–	–	–	–
Josh McKinley	8	11	6	17	1.0–3	–	–	–	–	–	–	–	–	–	–
Jermaine Guynn	12	8	8	16	2.5–11	1.0–8	–	–	–	–	–	–	–	–	–
Keyon Brown	12	9	6	15	1.5–11	1.5–11	–	–	–	–	–	–	–	–	–
Gerald Gooden Jr.	12	11	3	14	4.0–15	2.0–12	–	–	–	–	–	–	–	–	–
Nicardo Golding	10	5	8	13	–	–	–	–	–	–	–	–	–	–	–
Dan Dierking	12	8	2	10	–	–	–	–	–	–	–	–	–	–	–
Total	12	485	325	810	64–249	24–145	44	–	10–177	17.7	1	60	10–0	9	2
Opponents	12	517	279	796	68–246	24–148	48	–	13–206	15.8	1	47	10–39	7	2

=== Special teams ===
Name	Punting								Kickoffs				
Name	No.	Yds	Avg	Long	TB	FC	I20	Blkd	No.	Yds	Avg	TB	OB
Chris Summers	50	1919	38.4	59	5	16	14	1	16	935	58.4	2	1
Carson Wiggs	6	187	31.2	38	1	1	5	0	41	2403	58.6	3	1
Total	57	2106	36.9	59	6	17	19	1	57	3338	58.6	5	2
Opponents	55	2097	38.1	59	9	16	14	2	61	3828	62.8	10	2

Name	Punt returns					Kick returns				
Name	No.	Yds	Avg	TD	Long	No.	Yds	Avg	TD	Long
Desmond Tardy	9	57	6.3	0	13	12	345	28.8	0	68
Frank Halliburton	1	13	13.0	0	0	–	–	–	–	–
Mike Conway	0	11	0.0	1	11	–	–	–	–	–
Kory Sheets	–	–	–	–	–	14	259	18.5	0	45
Aaron Valentin	–	–	–	–	–	16	411	25.7	0	64
Royce Adams	–	–	–	–	–	5	94	18.8	0	28
Kyle Adams	–	–	–	–	–	1	3	3.0	0	3
Total	11	85	7.7	1	13	48	1112	23.2	0	68
Opponents	18	300	16.7	3	87	48	938	19.5	0	68

Statistics as of November 22, 2008 taken from Purdue CSTV

=== 2009 NFL draft ===
Player	Position	Round	Pick	NFL club
Alex Magee	Defensive Tackle	3	67	Kansas City Chiefs
Curtis Painter	Quarterback	6	201	Indianapolis Colts
