= 2008 Michigan State Spartans football team =

American college football season

2008 Michigan State Spartans football

Capital One Bowl, L 12–24 vs. Georgia
- Conference: Big Ten Conference

Ranking
- Coaches: No. 24
- AP: No. 24
- Record: 9–4 (6–2 Big Ten)
- Head coach: Mark Dantonio (2nd season)
- Offensive coordinator: Don Treadwell (2nd season)
- Defensive coordinator: Pat Narduzzi (2nd season)
- Home stadium: Spartan Stadium (c. 75,005 natural grass)

2008 Big Ten Conference football standings
	Conf.			Overall
Team	W		L	W		L
No. 8 Penn State $+	7	–	1	11	–	2
No. 9 Ohio State %+	7	–	1	10	–	3
No. 24 Michigan State	6	–	2	9	–	4
Northwestern	5	–	3	9	–	4
No. 20 Iowa	5	–	3	9	–	4
Wisconsin	3	–	5	7	–	6
Minnesota	3	–	5	7	–	6
Illinois	3	–	5	5	–	7
Purdue	2	–	6	4	–	8
Michigan	2	–	6	3	–	9
Indiana	1	–	7	3	–	9
$ – BCS representative as conference champion; % – BCS at-large representative; + – Conference co-champions; Rankings from AP Poll

The 2008 Michigan State Spartans football team represented Michigan State University in the 2008 NCAA Division I FBS football season. The team's head coach was Mark Dantonio. The Spartans played their home games at Spartan Stadium in East Lansing, Michigan. This was Dantonio's second season as the Spartans head coach.

== Schedule ==
The Spartans opened the 2008 season at California Memorial Stadium against California of the Pac-10. The game ended the home and home between Michigan State and California. The other game was played in the 2002 season at Spartan Stadium. Michigan State played their next three games at home against MAC opponent and instate rival Eastern Michigan, Sun Belt opponent Florida Atlantic, and rival Notre Dame.

Following the conclusion of the non-conference portion of their schedule, the Spartans began Big Ten play with an away game against Indiana and opened October with their first Big Ten home game against Iowa. The Spartans then traveled to Evanston, Illinois, to avenge a 2007 overtime loss against Northwestern. The following week, Michigan State returned to East Lansing to play against 2007 BCS runner-up Ohio State. Michigan State ended October in Ann Arbor to play in-state rival and nemesis Michigan. The Spartans opened their final month of the regular season against Wisconsin. The following week, Michigan State played its final home game of the season against Purdue. The Spartans had a bye week before traveling to University Park, Pennsylvania to play their final game of the season against Penn State.

Date	Time	Opponent	Rank	Site	TV	Result	Attendance
August 30	8:00 p.m.	at California*		Memorial Stadium; Berkeley, CA	ABC	L 31–38	62,956
September 6	12:00 p.m.	Eastern Michigan*		Spartan Stadium; East Lansing, MI	BTN	W 42–10	71,789
September 13	12:00 p.m.	Florida Atlantic*		Spartan Stadium; East Lansing, MI	ESPN2	W 17–0	70,321
September 20	3:30 p.m.	Notre Dame*		Spartan Stadium; East Lansing, MI (Megaphone Trophy)	ABC/ESPN	W 23–7	76,366
September 27	12:00 p.m.	at Indiana		Memorial Stadium; Bloomington, IN (Old Brass Spittoon)	ESPN	W 42–29	31,832
October 4	12:00 p.m.	Iowa^{†}		Spartan Stadium; East Lansing, MI	ESPN2	W 16–13	77,526
October 11	3:45 p.m.	at Northwestern	No. 23	Ryan Field; Evanston, IL	ESPN2	W 37–20	32,527
October 18	3:30 p.m.	No. 12 Ohio State	No. 20	Spartan Stadium; East Lansing, MI	ABC/ESPN2	L 7–45	77,360
October 25	3:30 p.m.	at Michigan		Michigan Stadium; Ann Arbor, MI (Paul Bunyan Trophy)	ABC/ESPN2	W 35–21	110,146
November 1	12:00 p.m.	Wisconsin	No. 22	Spartan Stadium; East Lansing, MI	ESPN	W 25–24	75,121
November 8	12:00 p.m.	Purdue	No. 18	Spartan Stadium; East Lansing, MI	BTN	W 21–7	75,522
November 22	3:30 p.m.	at No. 7 Penn State	No. 17	Beaver Stadium; University Park, PA (Land Grant Trophy)	ABC/ESPN	L 18–49	109,845
January 1, 2009	1:00 p.m.	No. 16 Georgia*	No. 19	Florida Citrus Bowl; Orlando, FL (Capital One Bowl)	ABC	L 12–24	59,681
*Non-conference game; ^{†}Homecoming; Rankings from AP Poll released prior to the game; All times are in Eastern time

== Game summaries ==
=== California ===
Team	1	2	3	4	Total
Michigan State	0	7	7	17	31
• California	7	10	7	14	38

- Date: August 30
- Location: California Memorial Stadium
  Berkeley, CA
- Game start: 8:12 p.m. EST
- Elapsed time: 3:38
- Game attendance: 62,956
- Game weather: 73F, Wind: NW 5 MPH, Clear
- Referee: Brian O'Cain
- TV announcers (ABC):
  Ron Franklin (Play-by-play)
  Ed Cunningham (Analyst)
  Heather Cox (Sideline)

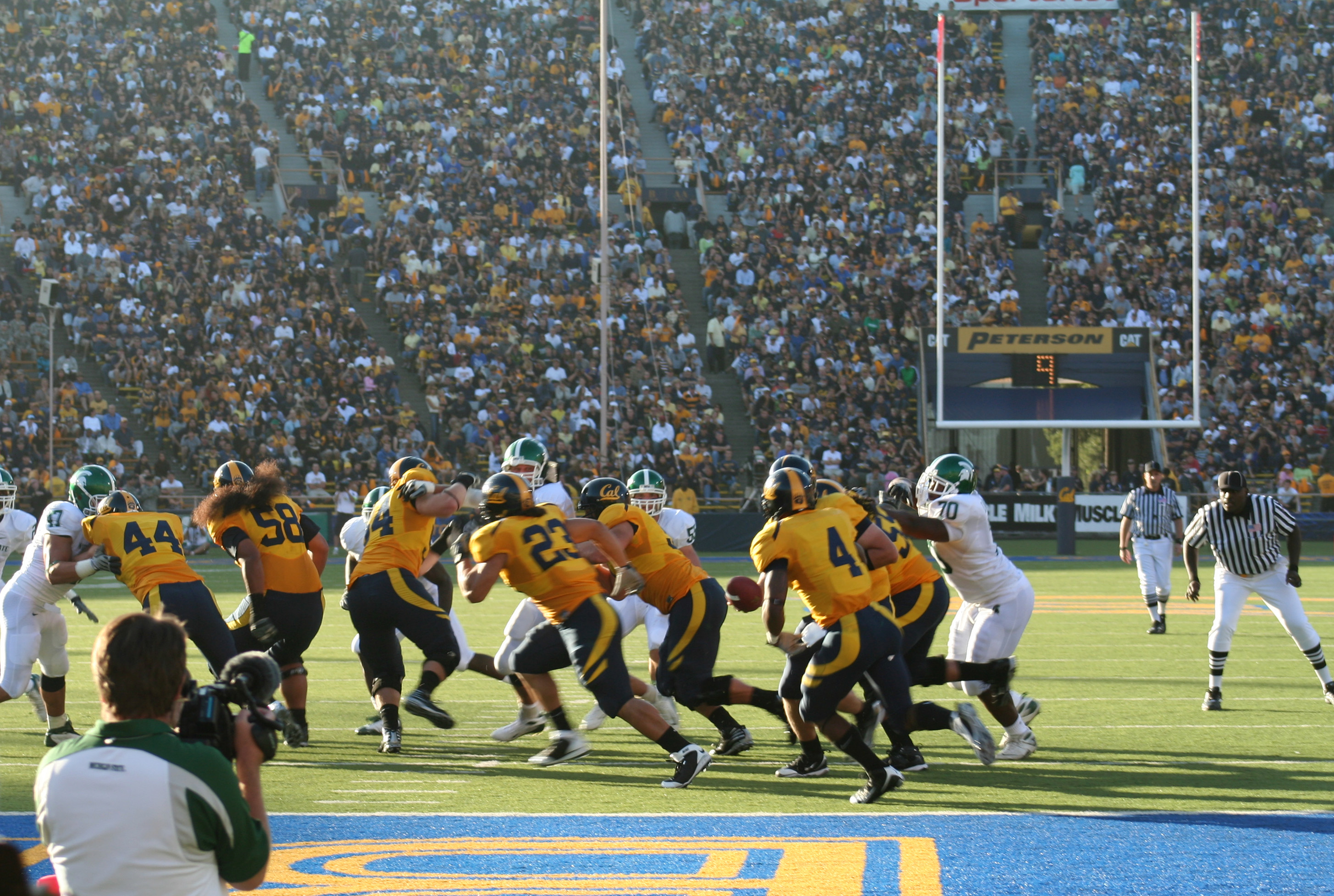
Spartans at California Golden Bears

Both teams were scoreless until a blocked Spartans punt resulted in a Bears touchdown in the first quarter. Cal scored again on a field goal by freshman kicker David Seawright in the second quarter. Michigan State responded when Otis Wiley intercepted a Nate Longshore pass and returning it for a touchdown, while Cal was able to counter with a touchdown run by Jahvid Best prior to the half.

The second half saw both teams score back and forth. The Spartans struck first with a touchdown run by Javon Ringer, followed by Cal QB Kevin Riley connecting with Cameron Morrah for a touchdown. Ringer made his second touchdown run of the game in the fourth quarter, while Riley made his second touchdown pass of the game to Will Ta'ufo'ou. After a Spartans field goal, freshman running back Shane Vereen scored on an 81-yard touchdown run that gave the Bears their final score of the game. The Spartans countered with a touchdown pass from Brian Hoyer to Mark Dell to get within 7 points and had a chance to tie the game with seconds left, but Hoyer threw four straight incompletions from midfield.

Longshore, who lost the starting quarterback job to Riley, threw for 62 yards with 2 interceptions. Riley threw for 202 yards with 2 touchdowns. The game marked the first time that two Cal running backs had completed over 100 yards rushing since the 2006 Holiday Bowl, with Best at 111 yards and Vereen at 101, respectively. Spartans quarterback Hoyer finished with 321 yards passing, including a touchdown and an interception. Ringer, who completed 1,447 yards rushing during the 2007 season, was held to 81 yards, which included 2 touchdowns.

=== Eastern Michigan ===
Team	1	2	3	4	Total
Eastern Michigan	0	7	0	3	10
• Michigan State	7	14	7	14	42

- Date: September 6
- Location: Spartan Stadium
  East Lansing, MI
- Game start: 12:03 p.m. EST
- Elapsed time: 3:06
- Game attendance: 71,789
- Game weather: 68 F, Wind: N 7 MPH, Sunny
- Referee: John Roggeman
- TV announcers (BTN):
  Mark Neely (Play-by-play)
  Glen Mason (Analyst)
  Shireen Saski (Sideline)

=== Florida Atlantic ===
Team	1	2	3	4	Total
Florida Atlantic	0	0	0	0	0
• Michigan State	0	7	3	7	17

- Date: September 13
- Location: Spartan Stadium
  East Lansing, MI
- Game start: 12:03 p.m. EST
- Elapsed time: 3:05
- Game attendance: 70,321
- Game weather: 68F, Wind: SSE 12 MPH, Rain
- Referee: John O'Neill
- TV announcers (ESPN2):
  Pam Ward (Play-by-play)
  Ray Bentley (Analyst)

It was a rainy day in East Lansing. On the second play of the game FAU broke a would-be 79 yd touchdown run, but it was called back on a holding penalty. Because of the horrible weather conditions, the teams combined had 3 lost fumbles, and it was a low-scoring affair. Javon Ringer had a career-high 282 yards and added 2 touchdowns.

=== Notre Dame ===
Team	1	2	3	4	Total
Notre Dame	0	0	0	7	7
• Michigan State	3	7	3	10	23

- Date: September 20
- Location: Spartan Stadium
  East Lansing, MI
- Game start: 3:37 p.m. EST
- Elapsed time: 3:13
- Game attendance: 76,366
- Game weather: 79F, Wind: WSW 10 MPH, Sunny
- Referee: Thomas Tomczyk
- TV announcers (ABC/ESPN):
  Brad Nessler (Play-by-play)
  Bob Griese (Analyst)
  Paul Maguire (Analyst)
  Stacey Dales (Sideline)

In week four, the Spartans welcomed undefeated rival Notre Dame. In the previous eight years of the rivalry, the visiting team had won each game. Michigan State was able to dominate the ground game on both sides of the ball, rushing for 203 yards while holding Notre Dame to just 16 rushing yards. Javon Ringer, who had over 200 yards rushing on the game, brought out his offensive line, tight ends, and fullbacks to the post-game press conference to recognize them for their contributions.

=== Indiana ===
Team	1	2	3	4	Total
• Michigan State	13	14	9	6	42
Indiana	7	15	7	0	29

- Date: September 27
- Location: Memorial Stadium
  Bloomington, IN
- Game start: 12:02 p.m. EST
- Elapsed time: 3:40
- Game attendance: 31,832
- Game weather: F, Wind: MPH,
- Referee: Dan Capron
- TV announcers (ESPN):
  Pam Ward (Play-by-play)
  Ray Bentley (Analyst)

The Spartans and the Hoosiers met for the Old Brass Spitoon. This game featured a great deal of offense. Spartans QB Brian Hoyer finally had a break out game. It had all been Javon Ringer up until this point. In one of the most exciting plays of the game, Hoyer hit TE Charlie Gantt on an 83 yd TD pass. But the Hoosiers came back with an 80 yd TD run by Marcus Thigpen, who tore up the defense. It was 27–22 at halftime. The defense stepped up in the second half for the Spartans, allowing only one touchdown. In one of the crucial plays of the game, a 99 yd TD pass was called back on a holding penalty. The Hoosiers were on their own goal line, and the holding penalty caused a safety. That sucked the momentum out the Hoosiers as the Spartans went on to win 42–29. Brian Hoyer was 14–26, threw for 261 yds, and 2 TD's, while Javon Ringer improved his Heisman resume, rushing for 198 yds, and 2 TD's. The Spartans improved to a 4–1 record.

=== Iowa ===
Team	1	2	3	4	Total
Iowa	0	3	3	7	13
• Michigan State	7	6	3	0	16

- Date: October 5
- Location: Stadium
  East Lansing, MI
- Game start: 12:02 p.m. EST
- Elapsed time: 2:58
- Game attendance: 77,526
- Game weather: 49F, Wind: NNW 4 MPH, Partly Cloudy
- Referee: Dennis Lipski
- TV announcers (ESPN2):
  Clay Matvick (Play-by-play)
  Ray Bentley (Analyst)

Michigan State got out to an early 13–0 lead behind two Brett Swenson field goals and a touchdown pass to Charlie Gantt. However, Iowa stormed back in the second half, with running back Shonn Greene running for 157 yards on the day. It took a late stop by Adam Decker on an Iowa fourth-and-one at the MSU 21-yard line to seal the victory for Michigan State. Iowa went on to win 6 of its final 7 games including a win in the Outback Bowl.

=== Northwestern ===
Team	1	2	3	4	Total
• Michigan State	17	7	10	3	37
Northwestern	0	7	10	3	20

- Date: October 11
- Location: Ryan Field
  Evanston, IL
- Game start: 3:45 p.m. EST
- Elapsed time: 3:17
- Game attendance: 32,527
- Game weather: 73F, Wind: SSE 7 MPH, Sunny
- Referee: John O'Neill
- TV announcers (ESPN2):
  Pam Ward (Play-by-play)
  Ray Bentley (Analyst)

=== Ohio State ===
Team	1	2	3	4	Total
• Ohio State	21	7	0	17	45
Michigan State	0	0	7	0	7

- Date: October 18
- Location: Spartan Stadium
  East Lansin, MI
- Game start: 3:37 p.m. EST
- Elapsed time: 3:08
- Game attendance: 77,360
- Game weather: 54F, Wind: SE 7 MPH, Partly Cloudy
- Referee: Todd Geerlings
- TV announcers (ABC/ESPN2):
  Brad Nessler (Play-by-play)
  Bob Griese (Analyst)
  Paul Maguire (Analyst)
  Stacey Dales (Sideline)

=== Michigan ===
Team	1	2	3	4	Total
• Michigan State	7	7	7	14	35
Michigan	7	7	7	0	21

- Date: October 25
- Location: Michigan Stadium
  Ann Arbor, MI
- Game start: 3:35 p.m. EST
- Elapsed time: 3:15
- Game attendance: 110,146
- Game weather: Low 50s, Wind: 10-20 MPH SW, Cloudy w/ Lt Rain
- Referee: Dave Witvoet
- TV announcers (ABC/ESPN2):
  Sean McDonough (Play-by-play)
  Chris Spielman (Analyst)
  Erin Andrews (Sideline)

The Spartans struck first, scoring on a huge 61-yard TD pass from Brian Hoyer to Blair White with just under 12 minutes to go in the first quarter. The Wolverines tied it up near the end of the first quarter when Brandon Minor scored on a 19-yard TD pass from Steven Threet (this score was the result of an incorrectly overturned call from the initial ruling of an incomplete pass). The Spartans took the lead back near the end of the half with a 64-yard TD run by Javon Ringer. The Wolverines tied it back up less than a minute later when Brandon Minor ran in a TD from 2 yards out. Midway through the third quarter, the Wolverines took their only lead of the game when QB Steven Threet ran in a touchdown himself from 2 yards out. However, the Spartans entirely controlled the game after that. The Spartans tied it back up when Charlie Gantt scored on a 4-yard TD pass near the end of the third quarter. The Wolverines were shut out in the fourth quarter. The Spartans took the lead for good in the fourth quarter when Javon Ringer ran in another TD, this time from 3 yards out, and capped their win when Josh Rouse scored on a 7-yard TD pass.

=== Wisconsin ===
Team	1	2	3	4	Total
Wisconsin	7	3	7	7	24
• Michigan State	0	6	7	12	25

- Date: November 1
- Location: Spartan Stadium
  East Lansing, MI
- Game start: 12:02 EST
- Elapsed time: 3:34
- Game attendance: 75,121
- Game weather: 48F, Wind: NE 10 MPH, Mostly Sunny
- Referee: Bill LeMonniner
- TV announcers (ESPN):
  Pam Ward (Play-by-play)
  Ray Bentley (Analyst)

Coming off of an emotional win against arch-rival Michigan, Michigan State appeared to suffer a bit of an emotional letdown against the underachieving Badgers. Wisconsin dominated the ground game on both sides of the ball, rushing for 281 yards while holding Michigan State to just 25 yards rushing. With Wisconsin leading 24–22 late in the fourth quarter with the ball in Spartan territory, the game appeared all but over. However, a holding call brought back what would have likely been the game-clinching first down for Wisconsin and forced them to punt. With 1:19 left to play, Brian Hoyer led a drive to set up the game-winning 44-yard field goal by Brett Swenson with 7 seconds remaining.

=== Purdue ===
Team	1	2	3	4	Total
Purdue	0	0	0	7	7
• Michigan State	7	7	7	0	21

- Date: November 8
- Location: Spartan Stadium
  East Lansing, MI
- Game start: 12:03 p.m. EST
- Elapsed time: 3:09
- Game attendance: 75,522
- Game weather: 37F, Wind: SW 13–24 MPH, Cloudy
- Referee: Dennis Lipski
- TV announcers (BTN):
  Wayne Larrivee (Play-by-play)
  Charles Davis (Analyst)
  Charissa Thompson (Sideline)

=== Penn State ===
Team	1	2	3	4	Total
Michigan State	0	7	0	11	18
• Penn State	7	21	14	7	49

- Date: November 22
- Location: Beaver Stadium
  University Park, PA
- Game start: 3:33 p.m. EST
- Elapsed time: 3:21
- Game attendance: 109,845
- Game weather: 28F, Wind: NW 10–15 MPH, Cold & Blustery, Snow
- Referee: David Witvoet
- TV announcers (ABC/ESPN2):
  Mike Patrick (Play-by-play)
  Todd Blackledge (Analyst)
  Holly Rowe (Sideline)

Coming into the game, Michigan State had a chance to clinch a share of their first Big Ten title since 1990. However, Penn State held Javon Ringer to 42 yards on 17 carries as the Lions beat Michigan state 49–18. Daryll Clark threw for 341 yards and 4 touchdown passes.

=== Capital One Bowl ===
Team	1	2	3	4	Total
• Georgia	3	0	14	7	24
Michigan State	3	3	0	6	12

- Date: January 1
- Location: Citrus Bowl
  Orlando, FL
- Game start: 1:07 p.m. EST
- Elapsed time: 3:19
- Game attendance: 59,681
- Game weather: 67F, Wind: E 24 MPH, Breezy
- Referee: Karl Richins
- TV announcers (ABC):
  Mike Patrick (Play-by-play)
  Todd Blackledge (Analyst)
  Holly Rowe (Sideline)

== Personnel ==
2008 Michigan State Spartans football team roster
Players
Coaches
Offense

Pos.	#	Name	Class
QB	8	Kirk Cousins	Fr
WR	3	B.J. Cunningham	Fr
WR	84	Deon Curry	Sr
WR	2	Mark Dell	So
QB	7	Brian Hoyer	Sr
RB	20	A.J. Jimmerson	Jr
WR	82	Keshawn Martin	Fr
RB	24	Caulton Ray	Fr
RB	23	Javon Ringer	Sr
QB	17	Charlie Snow	Fr
WR	25	Blair White	Jr
So	19	David Williams	So

Defense

Pos.	#	Name	Class
CB	5	Johnny Adams	Fr
CB		Jeremy Ware

Special teams

Pos.	#	Name	Class
K		Brett Swenson

Head coach

- Mark Dantonio

Coordinators/assistant coaches

== Coaching staff ==
- Don Treadwell – Offenvie Coordinator/Wide Receivers coach
- Dave Warner – Quarterbacks coach
- Dan Enos – Running backs coach
- Mark Staten – Tight ends coach/Tackles/Recruiting Coordinator
- Dan Roushar – Offensive line coach
- Pat Narduzzi – Defensive Coordinator
- Ted Gill – Defensive line coach
- Mike Tressel – Linebackers coach/Special Teams Coordinator
- Harlon Barnett – Secondary coach

Legend

- (C) Team captain
- (S) Suspended
- (I) Ineligible
- Injured
- Redshirt

== 2009 NFL draft ==
Only one Spartan was selected in the 2009 NFL draft. However, quarterback Brian Hoyer signed with the New England Patriots as an undrafted free agent.

Player	Round	Pick	Position	NFL team
Javon Ringer	5	173	Running Back	Tennessee Titans
