= 2008 Minnesota Golden Gophers football team =

American college football season

2008 Minnesota Golden Gophers football

Insight Bowl, L 21–42 vs. Kansas
- Conference: Big Ten Conference
- Record: 7–6 (3–5 Big Ten)
- Head coach: Tim Brewster (2nd season)
- Offensive coordinator: Mike Dunbar (2nd season)
- Offensive scheme: Spread
- Defensive coordinator: Ted Roof (1st season)
- Base defense: 4–3
- Captains: Steve Davis; Eric Decker; William VanDeSteeg; Adam Weber
- Home stadium: Hubert H. Humphrey Metrodome

2008 Big Ten Conference football standings
| | Conf. | | | Overall |
| Team | W | | L | W | | L |
|---|---|---|---|---|---|---|
| No. 8 Penn State $+ | 7 | – | 1 | 11 | – | 2 |
| No. 9 Ohio State %+ | 7 | – | 1 | 10 | – | 3 |
| No. 24 Michigan State | 6 | – | 2 | 9 | – | 4 |
| Northwestern | 5 | – | 3 | 9 | – | 4 |
| No. 20 Iowa | 5 | – | 3 | 9 | – | 4 |
| Wisconsin | 3 | – | 5 | 7 | – | 6 |
| Minnesota | 3 | – | 5 | 7 | – | 6 |
| Illinois | 3 | – | 5 | 5 | – | 7 |
| Purdue | 2 | – | 6 | 4 | – | 8 |
| Michigan | 2 | – | 6 | 3 | – | 9 |
| Indiana | 1 | – | 7 | 3 | – | 9 |
$ – BCS representative as conference champion; % – BCS at-large representative; + – Conference co-champions; Rankings from AP Poll

The 2008 Minnesota Golden Gophers football team represented the University of Minnesota as a member of the Big Ten Conference during the 2008 NCAA Division I FBS football season. Led by second-year head coach Tim Brewster, the Golden Gophers compiled an overall record of 7–6 with a mark of 3–5 in conference play, placing in a three-way tie for sixth in the Big Ten. Minnesota was invited to the Insight Bowl, where the Golden Gophers lost to Kansas. The team played home games at the Hubert H. Humphrey Metrodome in Minneapolis.

2008 was the Golden Gophers' final season at the Metrodome, as they moved to TCF Bank Stadium for the 2009 season.

== Schedule ==
| Date | Time | Opponent | Rank | Site | TV | Result | Attendance | Source |
|---|---|---|---|---|---|---|---|---|
| August 30 | 6:00 pm | Northern Illinois* | | Hubert H. Humphrey Metrodome; Minneapolis, MN | BTN | W 31–27 | 44,059 | |
| September 6 | 6:30 pm | at Bowling Green* | | Doyt Perry Stadium; Bowling Green, OH | ESPNU | W 42–17 | 23,184 | |
| September 13 | 11:00 am | Montana State* | | Hubert H. Humphrey Metrodome; Minneapolis, MN | BTN | W 35–23 | 43,929 | |
| September 20 | 11:00 am | Florida Atlantic* | | Hubert H. Humphrey Metrodome; Minneapolis, MN | BTN | W 37–3 | 41,003 | |
| September 27 | 11:00 am | at No. 14 Ohio State | | Ohio Stadium; Columbus, OH | BTN | L 21–34 | 105,175 | |
| October 4 | 11:00 am | Indiana | | Hubert H. Humphrey Metrodome; Minneapolis, MN | BTN | W 16–7 | 40,511 | |
| October 11 | 11:00 am | at Illinois | | Memorial Stadium; Champaign, IL | ESPN | W 27–20 | 62,870 | |
| October 25 | 11:00 am | at Purdue | No. 25 | Ross–Ade Stadium; West Lafayette, IN | ESPNC | W 17–6 | 54,215 | |
| November 1 | 11:00 am | Northwestern^{†} | No. 20 | Hubert H. Humphrey Metrodome; Minneapolis, MN | ESPN2 | L 17–24 | 54,122 | |
| November 8 | 11:00 am | Michigan | | Hubert H. Humphrey Metrodome; Minneapolis, MN (Little Brown Jug) | ESPN | L 6–29 | 55,040 | |
| November 15 | 2:30 pm | at Wisconsin | | Camp Randall Stadium; Madison, WI (rivalrye) | ABC | L 32–35 | 81,228 | |
| November 22 | 6:00 pm | Iowa | | Hubert H. Humphrey Metrodome; Minneapolis, MN (rivalry) | BTN | L 0–55 | 64,071 | |
| December 31 | 5:00 pm | vs. Kansas* | | Sun Devil Stadium; Tempe, AZ (Insight Bowl) | NFLN | L 21–42 | 49,103 | |
*Non-conference game; ^{†}Homecoming; Rankings from AP Poll released prior to the game; All times are in Central time

== Rankings ==
Ranking movements Legend: ██ Increase in ranking ██ Decrease in ranking — = Not ranked RV = Received votes
| | Week | | | | | | | | | | | | | | | | |
| Poll | Pre | 1 | 2 | 3 | 4 | 5 | 6 | 7 | 8 | 9 | 10 | 11 | 12 | 13 | 14 | 15 | Final |
|---|---|---|---|---|---|---|---|---|---|---|---|---|---|---|---|---|---|
| AP | — | — | — | RV | RV | — | — | RV | 25 | 20 | RV | — | — | — | — | — | — |
| Coaches | — | — | — | — | RV | — | RV | RV | 25 | 20 | RV | RV | — | — | — | — | — |
| Harris | Not released | | | | | | RV | RV | 25 | 20 | RV | RV | RV | — | — | — | Not released |
| BCS | Not released | | | | | | | | 24 | 17 | — | — | — | — | — | — | Not released |

== Preseason ==
On February 21, 2008, it was announced that Ted Roof, the previous head coach of Duke, would replace Everett Withers as the Gophers new defensive coordinator. Withers had previously announced that he was taking the defensive coordinator job at the University of North Carolina at Chapel Hill.

== Game summaries ==
=== Northern Illinois ===
| | 1 | 2 | 3 | 4 | Total |
|---|---|---|---|---|---|
| Huskies | 0 | 10 | 10 | 7 | 27 |
| Golden Gophers | 7 | 3 | 14 | 7 | 31 |

The Golden Gophers opened the 2008 season hosting a Saturday night game against Northern Illinois. After receiving the opening kickoff, Minnesota compiled a 16-play, 90-yard drive that chewed 8:50 off the clock and ended with an 8-yard TD pass from Adam Weber to Eric Decker. Northern Illinois responded early in the 2nd quarter with a 2-yard TD run from Justin Anderson, and a pair of field goals knotted the halftime score at 10–10. Two big plays by the Golden Gophers set the tone through the 3rd quarter – a 53-yard TD catch by Jack Simmons and 61-yard TD run by Duane Bennett that staked Minnesota to a 24–13 lead. The Huskies answered with two long TD bombs of 91 and 52 yards from Chandler Harnish to Nathan Palmer. As Minnesota began their final drive of the game on their own 26-yard line with 5:25 on the clock, they trailed NIU 27–24. Weber led a methodical drive down the field, completing all 5 of his pass attempts until the Gopher offense stalled in the red zone, bringing up 4th and 1 from the NIU 3. Rather than electing to kick the field goal and send the game into overtime, coach Brewster put the offense back out on the field, and they rewarded his aggressiveness. Bennett converted the 1st down on a short run, and the Gophers immediately ran the same play for a 1-yd TD. After putting the ensuing kickoff out of bounds and giving the Huskies the ball on their own 40, the Minnesota defense batted away a Hail Mary pass into the endzone as time expired to preserve the 31–27 victory.

=== Bowling Green ===
| | 1 | 2 | 3 | 4 | Total |
|---|---|---|---|---|---|
| Golden Gophers | 7 | 7 | 7 | 21 | 42 |
| Falcons | 0 | 10 | 7 | 0 | 17 |

Bowling Green hosted a Big Ten opponent for the first time ever as Minnesota traveled to Doyt L. Perry Stadium for a Saturday night game. Bowling Green was confident after coming off a 27–17 upset at No. 25 Pittsburgh the previous week. Despite being road underdogs, Minnesota showed no sign of nerves as they once again scored a TD on their first drive and never relinquished the lead, cruising to an easy 42–17 victory over the home Falcons. The story of this game was turnovers. After a relatively uneventful first half that ended with a Gophers lead of 14–10, Bowling Green's Roger Williams fumbled the opening kickoff of the second half. Starting the drive at the BGSU 23, Minnesota promptly marched in for the score. After a Falcon touchdown made it 21–17, BGSU turned the ball over on each of their next three possessions, each turnover ultimately resulting in a touchdown for the Golden Gophers. The 28 points off turnovers proved to be the difference, as Minnesota won consecutive games for the first time since November 2006. This was also the first road victory for the Gophers under coach Tim Brewster.

=== Montana State ===
| | 1 | 2 | 3 | 4 | Total |
|---|---|---|---|---|---|
| Bobcats | 6 | 7 | 3 | 7 | 23 |
| Golden Gophers | 0 | 21 | 14 | 0 | 35 |

Montana State traveled to Minneapolis to take on the Gophers for each team's 3rd game of the season. Despite being heavily favored over an FCS opponent, Minnesota played in a lackluster fashion from the get-go, and actually trailed 6–0 at the end of the first quarter. The Golden Gophers' offense woke up in the 2nd quarter, and put 14 points on the board on consecutive drives. Just when it appeared that Minnesota may have begun to put the game out of reach, Montana State's Demetrius Crawford returned a kickoff 100 yards for a TD. Minnesota was able to answer with another touchdown to make the halftime score 21–13 in their favor.

In the second half, the Gophers returned to their power running game of old, and their offense consisted mostly of true freshman DeLeon Eskridge toting the rock, and adding two more scores to his one from the first half. He finished the game with 114 yards and three touchdowns, proving himself a capable replacement for previous starter Duane Bennett, who was lost for the remainder of the season after suffering a knee injury during the Bowling Green game. Despite their less-than-spectacular performance, the Gophers managed to hold on for a 35–23 victory, and began a season 3–0 for the first time since 2005.

=== Florida Atlantic ===
| | 1 | 2 | 3 | 4 | Total |
|---|---|---|---|---|---|
| Owls | 0 | 3 | 0 | 0 | 3 |
| Golden Gophers | 10 | 6 | 7 | 14 | 37 |

The Gophers hosted the Owls for a Saturday morning game in Minneapolis. Minnesota looked to be the better team almost from the beginning, and finished with a 37–3 rout of Florida Atlantic. The defense continued to show its vast improvement over the 2007 version, holding FAU to a mere 3 points, the lowest total by a Minnesota opponent since a 62–0 rout of Temple in 2006. The Golden Gophers forced 4 interceptions by Owl QB Rusty Smith, widely considered to be a potential pro prospect. The offense was formidable as well, gaining a season-high 441 total yards. QB Adam Weber continued his solid, steady play, but did tally his first interception of the season on an ill-advised throw into triple coverage in an attempt to force the ball to WR Eric Decker in the end zone. The Gophers entered Big Ten play with a 4–0 record for the first time since 2005.

=== Ohio State ===
| | 1 | 2 | 3 | 4 | Total |
|---|---|---|---|---|---|
| Golden Gophers | 3 | 0 | 3 | 15 | 21 |
| Buckeyes | 7 | 13 | 7 | 7 | 34 |

Minnesota traveled to Columbus, Ohio for a Saturday morning showdown with the No. 13 Ohio State Buckeyes. The Gophers had not defeated OSU since a 29–17 upset victory in 2000, and this contest would end no differently. Preseason Heisman hopeful Chris Wells and freshman phenom Terrelle Pryor started in the backfield for the first time ever, as Wells returned from a foot injury. The two combined for 203 yards rushing, and Ohio State led wire-to-wire for a 34–21 victory. After coming off the worst season in school history, the Gophers could at least take solace in the fact that they were competitive with the Buckeyes, and that their loss in the Big Ten season opener put them at a much-improved 4–1 record.

=== Indiana ===
| | 1 | 2 | 3 | 4 | Total |
|---|---|---|---|---|---|
| Hoosiers | 0 | 7 | 0 | 0 | 7 |
| Golden Gophers | 0 | 7 | 6 | 3 | 16 |

Eric Decker continued his outstanding junior campaign, catching a school-record 13 receptions for 190 yards, leading host Minnesota to a 16–7 victory over the visiting Indiana Hoosiers. The Saturday morning tilt started slow, as neither team scored until the 2nd quarter, with the halftime score being knotted at 7–7. Minnesota's defense was stalwart the entire game, not allowing a first down until just before the half, with their only lapse being a 77-yard TD pass to RB Marcus Thigpen on a blown coverage play. It turned out to be a rather nondescript affair overall, with K Joel Monroe's three-second-half field goals staking the Gophers out to a 9-point lead, which ended up being the final margin of victory. This was the first Big Ten win of Tim Brewster's career, and put Minnesota at 1–1 in conference play. Indiana fell to 0–2 against conference foes.

=== Illinois ===
| | 1 | 2 | 3 | 4 | Total |
|---|---|---|---|---|---|
| Golden Gophers | 7 | 0 | 7 | 13 | 27 |
| Fighting Illini | 0 | 3 | 3 | 14 | 20 |

Minnesota traveled to Champaign, Illinois for an 11 am contest with the Fighting Illini. Though they were double-digit underdogs entering the game, the Gophers showed they were not intimidated, and led 7–3 at halftime. Once again, the Minnesota defense was the story of the game. Despite allowing 462 passing yards to standout QB Juice Williams, the swarming Gopher defense sacked him five times, forcing three turnovers and returning a Williams fumble for a touchdown. Minnesota held Illinois out of the endzone on a memorable goal line stand in the 3rd quarter. The referee initially signaled a touchdown on a scramble by Williams, but the call was overturned on a challenge, and firmly shifted the momentum in the Gophers' favor. DE Willie VanDeSteeg was named Walter Camp national player of the week after his 3 sack, 5 tackle performance. He was also named Big Ten defensive player of the week. Coming off their horrible 1–11 performance the previous year, Minnesota became bowl-eligible with a 6–1 (2–1) record, while Illinois fell to 3–3 (1–2). Minnesota held a winning conference record for the first time since 2005. Later in the weekend, both AP and coaches voters put the Gophers in the top 25, also for the first time since 2005.

=== Purdue ===
| | 1 | 2 | 3 | 4 | Total |
|---|---|---|---|---|---|
| Golden Gophers | 7 | 3 | 0 | 7 | 17 |
| Boilermakers | 6 | 0 | 0 | 0 | 6 |

Minnesota, ranked No. 24 in the initial 2008 BCS rankings and No. 25 AP/Coaches, traveled to West Lafayette, Indiana for a Saturday morning game against the Purdue Boilermakers. Sophomore QB Adam Weber led the way for the Gopher offense, throwing for one touchdown and adding one on the ground as he accumulated 212 yards passing and 60 yards rushing. The Minnesota defense forced four Purdue turnovers and held the Boilermaker offense to just 226 total yards as they lost their homecoming game in coach Joe Tiller's final season. Purdue (2–6, 0–4) lost for the 18th consecutive time to a ranked opponent, while the Gophers (7–1, 3–1) won at Ross–Ade Stadium for the first time since 1990.

=== Northwestern ===
| | 1 | 2 | 3 | 4 | Total |
|---|---|---|---|---|---|
| Wildcats | 10 | 7 | 0 | 7 | 24 |
| Golden Gophers | 0 | 17 | 0 | 0 | 17 |

=== Michigan ===
| | 1 | 2 | 3 | 4 | Total |
|---|---|---|---|---|---|
| Wolverines | 6 | 10 | 6 | 7 | 29 |
| Golden Gophers | 0 | 0 | 3 | 3 | 6 |

The Michigan Wolverines, under first-year head coach Rich Rodriguez, entered the game already guaranteed of missing their first bowl game in 35 seasons. They were able to come out strong against the Gophers, prevailing 29–6 in the 91st battle for the Little Brown Jug. With the loss and the Gophers' move to the new TCF Stadium for the 2009 season, the Michigan Wolverines closed the Metrodome-era of the series having never lost in the stadium in 12 tries.

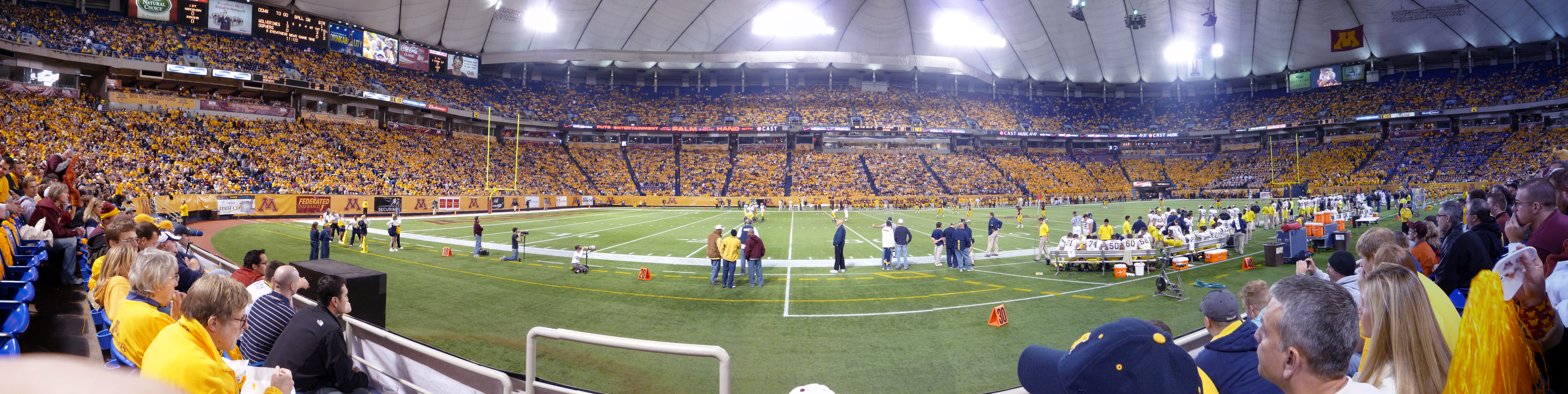
The 91st battle for the Little Brown Jug

=== Wisconsin ===
| | 1 | 2 | 3 | 4 | Total |
|---|---|---|---|---|---|
| Golden Gophers | 0 | 21 | 3 | 8 | 32 |
| Badgers | 7 | 0 | 10 | 18 | 35 |

=== Iowa ===
| | 1 | 2 | 3 | 4 | Total |
|---|---|---|---|---|---|
| Hawkeyes | 3 | 24 | 14 | 14 | 55 |
| Golden Gophers | 0 | 0 | 0 | 0 | 0 |

In their final game at the Metrodome, the Gophers were embarrassed by the rival Iowa Hawkeyes, 55–0, in front of 64,071 in the battle for Floyd of Rosedale. It was the fifth-worst loss in school history, the second-worst at home, and the worst ever in conference play.

=== Kansas ===
| | 1 | 2 | 3 | 4 | Total |
|---|---|---|---|---|---|
| Golden Gophers | 14 | 0 | 0 | 7 | 21 |
| Jayhawks | 14 | 14 | 7 | 7 | 42 |

== Roster ==
| Quarterbacks: 8 Adam Weber – sophomore; 9 David Pittman – junior; 13 John Nance – freshman; 17 Tony Mortenson – senior; 19 Mike Maciejowski – senior; Running backs: 6 Kevin Whaley – freshman; 12 Damola Ogundipe – sophomore; 18 R.J. Buckner – sophomore; 20 Jay Thomas – sophomore; 22 Duane Bennett – sophomore; 23 DeLeon Eskridge – freshman; 29 Shady Salamon – freshman; 34 Tyler Johnson – junior; 34 Andre Tate' – (redshirt) freshman; 46 Jake Ferris – freshman; Wide receivers: 1 Brodrick Smith – freshman; 2 Brandon Green – freshman; 7 Eric Decker – junior; 16 Ben Kuznia – junior; 80 Xzavian Brandon – freshman; 81 Ralph Spry – sophomore; 82 Johnny Johnson – freshman; 83 Da'Jon McKnight – freshman; 84 Jimmy Thompson – (redshirt) freshman; 87 Kyle Moore – (redshirt) freshman; 89 Brandon Randolph – freshman; Tight ends: 15 Jack Simmons – senior; 48 Nick Tow-Arnett – junior; 85 Eric Lair – freshman; 88 Collin McGarry – sophomore; 96 Curtis Hughes – sophomore | Centers: 52 Jeff Tow-Arnett – junior; 61 Trey Davis – (redshirt) freshman; Offensive guards: 53 D.J. Burris – sophomore; 66 Nedward Tavale – junior; 67 Nick Weber – senior; 68 Chris Bunders – (redshirt) freshman; 78 Ryan Orton – (redshirt) freshman; Offensive tackles: 60 Ryan Wynn – (redshirt) freshman; 63 Andy Brinkhaus – sophomore; 73 Jason Meinke – junior; 74 Ryan Ruckdashel – junior; 76 Dominic Alford – sophomore; 79 Matt Stommes – junior; Offensive line: 62 Curtis James – freshman; 64 Austin Hahn – freshman; 69 Jacob Glickstein – freshman; 71 Chris Mensen – junior; 75 Tyler Brasch – freshman; 77 Matt Carufel – junior; Defensive tackles: 51 Eric Small – junior; 57 Tony Strouth – (redshirt) freshman; 68 Jewhan Edwards – freshman; 89 Barrett Moen – junior; 99 Garrett Brown – junior | Defensive ends: 31 Terrell Combs – freshman; 55 Cedric McKinley – junior; 90 Raymond Henderson – junior; 91 William VanDeSteeg – senior; 92 William Brody – senior; 93 Derrick Onwuachi – junior; 96 Brandon Kirksey – freshman; 97 Anthony Jacobs – (redshirt) freshman; 98 D.L. Wilhite – freshman; Linebackers: 9 Gary Tinsley – freshman; 17 Sam Maresh – freshman; 21 Simoni Lawrence – junior; 26 Mike Rallis – freshman; 28 Kevin Mannion – senior; 30 Lee Campbell – junior; 32 Nathan Triplett – junior; 33 Rex Sharpe – junior; 35 Jon Hoese – sophomore; 42 Logan U'u – junior; 43 Ryan Grant – freshman; 44 Deon Hightower – senior; 45 Thomas Hennessey – junior; 50 Patrick Sveum – junior; 56 Steve Davis – senior; 59 Steve Moore – senior; 94 Michael Plath – freshman | Cornerbacks: 2 Ryan Collado – sophomore; 11 Troy Stoudermire – freshman; 13 Michael McKelton – junior; 15 Traye Simmons – junior; 24 Marcus Sherels – junior; Strong safeties: 27 Kyle Theret – sophomore; Free safeties: 1 Tramaine Brock – junior; 4 Keanon Cooper – freshman; 49 Scott Jilek – sophomore; Defensive backs: 3 Kim Royston – junior; 19 Andrew Allison – junior; 25 Tim Dandridge – freshman; 37 Tim Horton – freshman; 38 Marcus Singletary – junior; 39 Nicholas Stommes – junior; 40 Nathan Tow-Arnett – freshman; 48 Bryan Klitzke – (redshirt) freshman; Kickers: 36 Joel Monroe – senior; 37 Eric Ellestad – sophomore; 38 David Schwerman – freshman; Punters: 38 Blake Haudan – junior; 41 Justin Kucek – senior; Long snappers: 47 Ryan Coleman – sophomore |
