= Royce Adams =

American gridiron football player (born 1988)

No. 11, 23, 28
- Position: Defensive back

Personal information
- Born: May 3, 1988 (age 38); Cleveland, Ohio, U.S.
- Listed height: 6 ft 0 in (1.83 m)
- Listed weight: 190 lb (86 kg)

Career information
- High school: Cleveland (OH) Glenville
- College: Purdue
- NFL draft: 2010: undrafted

Career history
- Pittsburgh Power (2011); New York Jets (2012); Cleveland Browns (2014)*; Calgary Stampeders (2015)*; Florida Blacktips (2015); Orlando Predators (2016)*; BC Lions (2016)*; Saskatchewan Roughriders (2016)
- * Offseason or practice squad member only

Career CFL statistics
- Tackles: 7
- Stats at CFL.ca

Career AFL statistics
- Tackles: 47
- Interceptions: 0
- pbu: 10
- Forced fumbles: 1
- Stats at ArenaFan.com
- Stats at Pro Football Reference

Royce Bernard Adams Jr. (born May 3, 1988) is an American former professional football defensive back. He was signed by the Pittsburgh Power of the Arena Football League (AFL) as an undrafted free agent in 2010, and then later signed by the New York Jets of the National Football League (NFL) in 2012. He played college football at Purdue.

== Early life ==
He transferred from Lakewood St. Edward High School to Glenville High School for his senior in which he recorded seven interceptions for the season. His head coach at Glenville High School was Ted Ginn Sr., the father of Carolina Panthers wide receiver and punt returner Ted Ginn Jr.

== College career ==
He played at Purdue University. He finished with 91 tackles, one interception, 3 passes defended and a forced fumble.

In his senior season, he finished the season with 6 tackles.

In his junior season, he played in 12 games, recording 18 tackles for the season. On October 18, 2008, he recorded a career high 10 tackles against Northwestern but Purdue loss that game 48–26.

In his sophomore year, he played in 13 games. he finished the season with 30 tackles and a passes defended. On October 13, 2007, he had 4 tackles in a game against Michigan in which Purdue loss 48–21.

In his freshman year, he played in 14 games in which he recorded 37 tackles, one interception, 2 passes defended and a forced fumble. On October 14, 2006, he had 2 tackles, an interception and a pass deflection against Northwestern as Purdue won the game. On November 4, 2006, he recorded 2 tackles and a forced fumble against Michigan State as Purdue wins the game 17–15.

== Professional career ==
=== Pittsburgh Power ===
On November 22, 2010, he signed with the Pittsburgh Power of the Arena Football League. He finished the 2011 season with 47 tackles and a forced fumble.

=== New York Jets ===
On January 5, 2012, Adams signed with the New York Jets.

On July 31, 2012, he was placed on injured reserve because of a knee injury in which he suffered during the offseason. He was released on August 31, 2013.

=== Cleveland Browns ===
He was signed by the Cleveland Browns on February 12, 2014. The Browns released Adams on August 25, 2014.

=== Orlando Predators ===
On November 20, 2015, Adams was assigned to the Orlando Predators. He was placed on recallable reassignment on March 22, 2016.
