= Boilermaker (disambiguation) =

A boilermaker is a trained craftsman who produces steel fabrications from plates and sections.

Boilermaker may also refer to:

- Boilermaker (beer cocktail)
- Purdue Boilermakers, Purdue University's intercollegiate athletics teams
  - The Boilermaker, a statue
- Boilermaker Road Race, a race in Utica, New York
- "Boilermaker", a song by The Jesus Lizard from Liar
- “Boilermaker”, a song by Royal Blood from Typhoons
- Boilermaker, a member of the International Brotherhood of Boilermakers
