= The Boilermaker =

- Interactive map of The Boilermaker
- Location: Purdue University, West Lafayette, Indiana, U.S.
- Coordinates: 40°26′04″N 86°55′01″W
- Designer: Jon Hair
- Type: Statue
- Material: Bronze (5,400 lbs)
- Height: 18' (not including the base)
- Beginning date: 2003
- Completion date: September 26, 2005 (erected)
- Opening date: November 4, 2005
- Dedicated to: Carl Christian Grotnes

The Boilermaker is a statue that was dedicated on November 4, 2005, as a monument commemorating the "indomitable spirit of the [Purdue] boilermaker." The statue is located adjacent to Ross Ade Stadium on the Purdue University-West Lafayette campus's intercollegiate sports complex.

The statue was commissioned by an anonymous donor. The estimated cost was approximately $500,000.

== Game day traditions ==
During the 2008 football season, an unofficial jersey bearing the number 90 of the team's co-captain Ryan Baker was worn by the statue during each home game. The tradition was started by Purdue Army ROTC Cadet Tommy Woroszylo (BSME, 2010). Woroszylo passed on the tradition to the campus Army ROTC program. The honor of hanging the jersey for each home game has been carried out by the following Boilermakers:

- 2013: Dan Heath
- 2012: Dan Rosenbalm
- 2010-11: Keegan Wisehart
- 2008-09: Tommy Woroszylo

The jersey tradition has been nationally recognized: it was shown live on ESPN, written about in the Lafayette Journal & Courier, and shown during the 2010 season of NBC's Parks and Recreation. During the 2013 season, the jersey was stolen on two separate occasions; therefore, the gameday tradition came to an end with the 2014 football season.
