= 2008 Illinois Fighting Illini football team =

American college football season

2008 Illinois Fighting Illini football
- Conference: Big Ten Conference
- Record: 5–7 (3–5 Big Ten)
- Head coach: Ron Zook (4th season)
- Offensive coordinator: Mike Locksley (4th season)
- Offensive scheme: Spread option
- Co-defensive coordinators: Dan Disch (2nd season); Curt Mallory (2nd season)
- Base defense: 4–3
- Captains: Arrelious Benn; David Lindquist; Brit Miller; Juice Williams
- Home stadium: Memorial Stadium

2008 Big Ten Conference football standings
	Conf.			Overall
Team	W		L	W		L
No. 8 Penn State $+	7	–	1	11	–	2
No. 9 Ohio State %+	7	–	1	10	–	3
No. 24 Michigan State	6	–	2	9	–	4
Northwestern	5	–	3	9	–	4
No. 20 Iowa	5	–	3	9	–	4
Wisconsin	3	–	5	7	–	6
Minnesota	3	–	5	7	–	6
Illinois	3	–	5	5	–	7
Purdue	2	–	6	4	–	8
Michigan	2	–	6	3	–	9
Indiana	1	–	7	3	–	9
$ – BCS representative as conference champion; % – BCS at-large representative; + – Conference co-champions; Rankings from AP Poll

The 2008 Illinois Fighting Illini football team was an American football team that represented the University of Illinois Urbana-Champaign as a member of the Big Ten Conference during the 2008 NCAA Division I FBS football season. In their fourth season under head coach Ron Zook, the Fighting Illini compiled a 5–7 record (3–5 in conference games), finished in a three-way tie for sixth place in the Big Ten, and outscored opponents by a total of 344 to 319.

Quarterback Juice Williams led the Big Ten with 3,173 passing yards, 22 passing touchdowns, and 16 interceptions. Williams also led the team with 719 rushing yards. The team's other statistical leaders included wide receiver Arrelious Benn (67 receptions for 1,055 yards) and kicker Matt Keller (84 points scored, 39 of 41 extra points, 15 of 20 field goals).

The team played its home games at Memorial Stadium in Champaign, Illinois.

== Schedule ==
Date	Time	Opponent	Rank	Site	TV	Result	Attendance	Source
August 30	7:30 p.m.	vs. No. 6 Missouri*	No. 20	Edward Jones Dome; St. Louis, MO (rivalry)	ESPN	L 42–52	66,441	
September 6	11:00 a.m.	No. 19 (FCS) Eastern Illinois*	No. 24	Memorial Stadium; Champaign, IL	BTN	W 47–21	60,131	
September 13	11:00 a.m.	Louisiana–Lafayette*	No. 24	Memorial Stadium; Champaign, IL	BTN	W 20–17	58,632	
September 27	7:00 p.m.	at No. 12 Penn State	No. 22	Beaver Stadium; University Park, PA	ABC	L 24–38	109,626	
October 4	2:30 p.m.	at Michigan		Michigan Stadium; Ann Arbor, MI (rivalry)	ABC/ESPN2	W 45–20	109,750	
October 11	11:00 a.m.	Minnesota^{†}		Memorial Stadium; Champaign, IL	ESPN	L 20–27	62,870	
October 18	7:00 p.m.	Indiana		Memorial Stadium; Champaign, IL (rivalry)	BTN	W 55–13	62,870	
October 25	11:00 a.m.	at Wisconsin		Camp Randall Stadium; Madison, WI	ESPN2	L 17–27	81,241	
November 1	2:30 p.m.	Iowa		Memorial Stadium; Champaign, IL	ABC/ESPN	W 27–24	62,870	
November 8	11:00 a.m.	vs. Western Michigan*		Ford Field; Detroit, MI	ESPN+	L 17–23	12,865	
November 15	12:00 p.m.	No. 10 Ohio State		Memorial Stadium; Champaign, IL (Illibuck Trophy)	ESPN	L 20–30	62,870	
November 22	2:30 p.m.	at Northwestern		Ryan Field; Evanston, IL (rivalry)	BTN	L 10–27	32,166	
*Non-conference game; ^{†}Homecoming; Rankings from AP Poll released prior to the game; All times are in Central time

== Game summaries ==
=== Missouri ===
	1	2	3	4	Total
Fighting Illini	6	7	15	14	42
Tigers	7	24	14	7	52

=== Eastern Illinois ===
	1	2	3	4	Total
Panthers	7	0	0	14	21
Fighting Illini	7	19	14	7	47

=== Louisiana-Lafayette ===
	1	2	3	4	Total
Ragin' Cajuns	3	0	0	14	17
Fighting Illini	10	7	0	3	20

In the first quarter, Matt Eller kicked a 51-yard field goal. Brit Miller recovered Michael Desormeaux's fumble for a 27-yard touchdown. Drew Edmiston kicked a 24-yard field goal for Louisiana-Lafayette. Juice Williams passed to Daniel Dufrene for a 10-yard touchdown in the 2nd quarter.

In the second half, Desormeaux rushed for a 34-yard touchdown and passed to Erick Jones for an 11-yard touchdown. Matt Eller kicked a 27-yard field goal for the Fighting Illini.

=== Penn State ===
The Illini lost on the road to the Nittany Lions 38–24 in a nationally televised, prime time, "White Out" game at Beaver Stadium. Illinois jumped out to a 14–7 lead, becoming the first team to take a lead on the Nittany Lions and the first to score points against them in the first quarter this season. However, the Nittany Lions responded with two touchdowns en route to a 21–14 halftime lead. The Illini wouldn't score again until kicking a field goal on the final play of the third quarter after recovering a Stephfon Green fumble, but Derrick Williams returned the ensuing kickoff for a touchdown.

The loss was head coach Ron Zook’s first as a head coach against a ranked opponent. The Illini's 24 points were the most allowed by Penn State this season as were their 189 total rushing yards.

Penn State wide receiver Derrick Williams became the first player under PSU head coach Joe Paterno to score a rushing, a receiving, and a kick return touchdown in the same game. Williams was selected the Big Ten Special Teams Player of the Week.

	1	2	3	4	Total
Fighting Illini	14	0	3	7	24
Nittany Lions	14	7	3	14	38

=== Michigan ===
	1	2	3	4	Total
Fighting Illini	3	14	7	21	45
Wolverines	14	0	0	6	20

=== Minnesota ===
	1	2	3	4	Total
Golden Gophers	7	0	7	13	27
Fighting Illini	0	3	3	14	20

=== Indiana ===
	1	2	3	4	Total
Hoosiers	7	0	3	3	13
Fighting Illini	14	14	13	14	55

=== Wisconsin ===
	1	2	3	4	Total
Fighting Illini	0	10	7	0	17
Badgers	3	7	7	10	27

The Fighting Illini fell to the Badgers 27–17 for Wisconsin's first Big Ten win of the year. The Badgers outscored Illinois 17–7 in the second half.

=== Iowa ===
	1	2	3	4	Total
Hawkeyes	0	6	3	15	24
Fighting Illini	7	3	7	10	27

=== Western Michigan ===
	1	2	3	4	Total
Fighting Illini	7	0	3	7	17
Broncos	3	17	0	3	23

=== Ohio State ===
	1	2	3	4	Total
Buckeyes	9	14	0	7	30
Fighting Illini	7	6	0	7	20

=== Northwestern ===
	1	2	3	4	Total
Fighting Illini	0	0	7	3	10
Wildcats	6	7	3	11	27

== Rankings ==
Ranking movements Legend: ██ Increase in ranking ██ Decrease in ranking — = Not ranked RV = Received votes
	Week																
Poll	Pre	1	2	3	4	5	6	7	8	9	10	11	12	13	14	15	Final
AP	20	24	24	22	22	RV	RV	—	—	—	—	—	—	—	—	—	—
Coaches	19	25	RV	23	21	RV	RV	—	RV	—	RV	—	—	—	—	—	—
Harris	Not released						RV	RV	RV	—	—	—	—	—	—	—	Not released
BCS	Not released								—	—	—	—	—	—	—	—	Not released
