= Ryan Baker (American football) =

American football player (born 1984)

- Baker in 2009

No. 79, 90
- Position: Defensive tackle

Personal information
- Born: November 25, 1984 (age 41); Indianapolis, Indiana, U.S.
- Listed height: 6 ft 5 in (1.96 m)
- Listed weight: 302 lb (137 kg)

Career information
- High school: Bishop Chatard (Indianapolis)
- College: Purdue
- NFL draft: 2009: undrafted

Career history
- Miami Dolphins (2009−2012); Oakland Raiders (2013)*
- * Offseason or practice squad member only

Career NFL statistics
- Total tackles: 7
- Sacks: 0.5
- Stats at Pro Football Reference

Ryan Edward Baker (born November 25, 1984) is an American former professional football player who was a defensive end for the Miami Dolphins of the National Football League (NFL). He was signed by the Dolphins as an undrafted free agent in 2009. He played college football for the Purdue Boilermakers.

== Early life ==
Baker started off his career at Bishop Chatard High School in Indianapolis, Indiana, where he won several awards, including the 2004 Indianapolis Star 'Athlete of the Year'. He was a four-year two-way starter and two-time team captain for the Bishop Chatard Trojans. He led the team to three consecutive Indiana high school football class 3A State Championships in the 2001, 2002, and 2003 seasons. He was runner-up 2003 Mr. Indiana Football behind Desmond Tardy, of Warren Central High School and participated in the 2004 Indiana All-Star Game. Baker was also a member of the 2004 U.S. Army All-American Bowl East Football team, along with former Dolphins teammates Ted Ginn Jr. and Chad Henne. Baker was the recipient of the 2004 Doc Blanchard Award for excellence in community service, education, and athletic distinction.

Baker was also a four-year starter and member of the 2003 Bishop Chatard Indiana high school basketball 3A state championship team along with his childhood friend Dan Cage. At that time, Bishop Chatard was only the second high school in Indiana history to win both a state championship in football and basketball in the same academic year.

== College career ==
=== Recruitment ===
During the 2003-2004 college recruiting season, Baker verbally committed to join the University of Notre Dame football program under head coach Tyrone Willingham. The Notre Dame football program publicly announced the commitment though Baker had not submitted his official commitment papers. About seven weeks following the incident, Baker committed to joining the Purdue University football program, under head coach Joe Tiller, by submitting formal commitment papers to Purdue University.

College recruiting
Name	Hometown	School	Height	Weight	40^{‡}	Commit date
Ryan Baker; DE	Indianapolis, Indiana	Bishop Chatard	6 ft 6 in (1.98 m)	225 lb (102 kg)	4.8	Mar 24, 2004
Ryan Baker; DE	Recruit ratings: Scout: Rivals:					
Overall recruit ranking: Scout: 14 (DE) Rivals: 11 (DE), 2 (IN)
Note: In many cases, Scout, Rivals, 247Sports, On3, and ESPN may conflict in their listings of height and weight.; In these cases, the average was taken. ESPN grades are on a 100-point scale.; Sources: "2004 Purdue Football Commits". Scout.; "Scout.com Team Recruiting Rankings". Scout.; "2004 Team Ranking". Rivals.com.

Baker, also being an accomplished basketball player, was recruited by Division I basketball programs. He often received scholarship offers from both the Basketball and Football programs of the same university. Though he was a successful multi-sport athlete, Baker chose to focus solely on Football.

"Ryan is the epitome of a Boilermaker student-athlete. No one works harder than he does - in the classroom, the weight room, the playing field. There are high-motor guys, and then there is 'Bakes.' He takes it to another level."

— Purdue University Head Coach Joe Tiller, October 2, 2008.

=== Purdue ===
Baker played college football at Purdue University (2004–2008). He was co-captain along with Curtis Painter, and Jermaine Guynn for the 2008 football season and his position of specialty was defensive tackle. During each home game of the 2008 season, "The Boilermaker" statue bore the number 90 jersey in honor of Baker's indomitable spirit and Boilermaker style of football.

Baker graduated from the Purdue University Krannert School of Management with a Bachelor's degree in Management in December 2008.

== Professional career ==
=== Miami Dolphins ===
"He went in the game and did what Ryan does every day...hustled, went a million miles per hour and found the football."

— Miami Dolphins head coach Tony Sparano concerning Baker's professional debut, November 30, 2009.

==== 2009 ====
After going undrafted in the 2009 NFL draft, Baker signed with the Miami Dolphins as an undrafted free agent on April 30, 2009. He was waived by the Dolphins during final cuts on September 5 and subsequently re-signed to the team's practice squad. Baker made his professional debut against the Buffalo Bills at Ralph Wilson Stadium on November 29, 2009, after being signed to the active roster the previous day, recording a quarterback sack his second play from scrimmage.

“He’s an amoeba. He’s got no bones in his body...I’ll tell you what I love about this guy...If you give him that job, now whatever job you give to Ryan Baker, he’s going to do it 200%."

— Miami Dolphins head coach Tony Sparano concerning Ryan Baker’s versatility, November 4, 2010.

==== 2010 ====
Baker was waived during final cuts on September 4, 2010, and re-signed to the Dolphins' practice squad. He was soon reinstated to the active roster on September 18 after the team waived defensive end Rob Rose.

==== 2011 ====
Baker was released from the team during week four of the season, on September 28, 2011, to make room for running back Steve Slaton. Baker was resigned to the team on November 30, 2011, and Igor Olshansky was subsequently released.

==== 2012 ====
On March 20, 2012, Baker was re-signed to a one-year contract. On August 31, 2012, he was released from the team during final cuts and later re-signed to the team during the second week of the season on September 12, 2012, in order to serve in a reserve role in place of the injured Tony McDaniel. Baker was again released from the reserve role during the third week of the season on September 18, 2012, and the team subsequently signed former Detroit Lions defensive lineman Andre Fluellen.

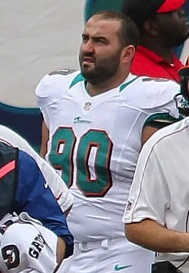
Baker with the Dolphins in 2012

=== Oakland Raiders ===
Baker signed with the Oakland Raiders on August 5, 2013. Baker was released on the Raiders' final cut day.

== Personal life ==
During the summer, The Ryan Baker Foundation hosts the annual Ryan Baker Football Camp for youth football players in the Indianapolis area.
