= Robert Rose (gridiron football) =

American gridiron football player (born 1987)

Rob Rose
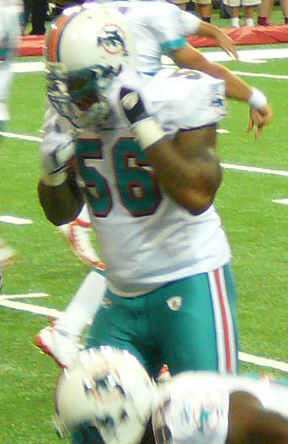
- Rose with the Dolphins in 2011

No. 9, 99
- Position: Defensive end

Personal information
- Born: December 24, 1987 (age 38); Cleveland, Ohio, U.S.
- Listed height: 6 ft 4 in (1.93 m)
- Listed weight: 291 lb (132 kg)

Career information
- High school: Cleveland (OH) Glenville
- College: Ohio State
- NFL draft: 2010: undrafted

Career history
- Seattle Seahawks (2010)*; Miami Dolphins (2010); Hamilton Tiger-Cats (2011–2012); Saskatchewan Roughriders (2012); Dallas Cowboys (2012)*; Cleveland Gladiators (2014); Las Vegas Outlaws (2015)*; Cleveland Gladiators (2016)
- * Offseason or practice squad member only
- Stats at Pro Football Reference
- Stats at CFL.ca (archive)

Robert Rose (born December 24, 1987) is an American former professional football defensive end. He was signed by the Seattle Seahawks as an undrafted free agent in 2010. He played college football at Ohio State.

== Professional career ==
=== Seattle Seahawks ===
Rose was acquired by the Seattle Seahawks as an undrafted free agent on April 24, 2010, and played the 2010 preseason with them. He was waived during final cuts on September 4.

=== Miami Dolphins ===
The Miami Dolphins claimed Rose off waivers on September 5, 2010, and placed him on the teams inactive roster for the season opener against the Dallas Cowboys. Rose was waived by the Dolphins on September 18, in order to promote veteran defensive lineman Ryan Baker from the practice squad to the active roster. Rose was re-signed to the team's practice squad on September 21, and was promoted to the active roster on September 29. He was waived on October 27 and re-signed to the team's practice squad on October 28. Rose was released prior to the 2011 NFL season on September 3, 2011.

=== Hamilton Tiger-Cats ===
Rose signed with the Hamilton Tiger-Cats on October 18, 2011.

=== Cleveland Gladiators ===
Rose was assigned to the Cleveland Gladiators of the Arena Football League on October 4, 2013.

=== Las Vegas Outlaws ===
Rose was selected by the Las Vegas Outlaws in the 2014 Expansion Draft on December 22, 2014.

=== Cleveland Gladiators ===
In March 2016, Rose was assigned to the Cleveland Gladiators. On May 5, 2016, Rose was placed on reassignment.
