= 2008 Northwestern Wildcats football team =

American college football season

2008 Northwestern Wildcats football

Alamo Bowl, L 23–30 ^{OT} vs. Missouri
- Conference: Big Ten Conference
- Record: 9–4 (5–3 Big Ten)
- Head coach: Pat Fitzgerald (3rd season)
- Offensive coordinator: Mick McCall (1st season)
- Offensive scheme: Spread
- Defensive coordinator: Mike Hankwitz (1st season)
- Base defense: Multiple 4–3
- Captains: C.J. Bachér; Prince Kwateng; Eric Peterman; Brendan Smith
- Home stadium: Ryan Field

2008 Big Ten Conference football standings
	Conf.			Overall
Team	W		L	W		L
No. 8 Penn State $+	7	–	1	11	–	2
No. 9 Ohio State %+	7	–	1	10	–	3
No. 24 Michigan State	6	–	2	9	–	4
Northwestern	5	–	3	9	–	4
No. 20 Iowa	5	–	3	9	–	4
Wisconsin	3	–	5	7	–	6
Minnesota	3	–	5	7	–	6
Illinois	3	–	5	5	–	7
Purdue	2	–	6	4	–	8
Michigan	2	–	6	3	–	9
Indiana	1	–	7	3	–	9
$ – BCS representative as conference champion; % – BCS at-large representative; + – Conference co-champions; Rankings from AP Poll

The 2008 Northwestern Wildcats football team represented Northwestern University in the Big Ten Conference during the 2008 NCAA Division I FBS football season. Pat Fitzgerald, in his third season at Northwestern, was the team's head coach. The Wildcats played their homes games at Ryan Field in Evanston, Illinois.

== Schedule ==
Date	Time	Opponent	Rank	Site	TV	Result	Attendance	Source
August 30	11:00 am	Syracuse*		Ryan Field; Evanston, IL	ESPN2	W 30–10	20,015	
September 6	6:00 pm	at Duke*		Wallace Wade Stadium; Durham, NC		W 24–20	23,614	
September 13	11:00 am	No. 11 (FCS) Southern Illinois*		Ryan Field; Evanston, IL	BTN	W 33–7	19,062	
September 20	11:00 am	Ohio*		Ryan Field; Evanston, IL	BTN	W 16–8	22,069	
September 27	11:00 am	at Iowa		Kinnick Stadium; Iowa City, IA	ESPNC	W 22–17	70,585	
October 11	2:30 pm	No. 23 Michigan State		Ryan Field; Evanston, IL	ESPN2	L 20–37	32,527	
October 18	11:00 am	Purdue^{†}		Ryan Field; Evanston, IL	ESPN2	W 48–26	27,163	
October 25	11:00 am	at Indiana		Memorial Stadium; Bloomington, IN	BTN	L 19–21	30,698	
November 1	11:00 am	at No. 20 Minnesota		Hubert H. Humphrey Metrodome; Minneapolis, MN	ESPN2	W 24–17	54,122	
November 8	11:00 am	No. 12 Ohio State		Ryan Field; Evanston, IL	ESPN2	L 10–45	47,130	
November 15	11:00 am	at Michigan		Michigan Stadium; Ann Arbor, MI (rivalry)	ESPN2	W 21–14	107,856	
November 22	2:30 pm	Illinois		Ryan Field; Evanston, IL (rivalry)	BTN	W 27–10	32,166	
December 29	7:00 pm	vs. No. 25 Missouri	No. 22	Alamodome; San Antonio, TX (Alamo Bowl)	ESPN	L 23–30 ^{OT}	55,986	
*Non-conference game; ^{†}Homecoming; Rankings from AP Poll released prior to the game; All times are in Central time

== Game summaries ==
=== Syracuse ===
	1	2	3	4	Total
Orange	3	0	7	0	10
Wildcats	0	9	14	7	30

=== Duke ===
	1	2	3	4	Total
Wildcats	7	10	0	7	24
Blue Devils	7	3	3	7	20

=== Southern Illinois ===
	1	2	3	4	Total
Salukis	7	0	0	0	7
Wildcats	6	10	10	7	33

=== Ohio ===
	1	2	3	4	Total
Bobcats	0	0	8	0	8
Wildcats	6	10	0	0	16

=== Iowa ===
	1	2	3	4	Total
Wildcats	0	10	6	6	22
Hawkeyes	3	14	0	0	17

=== Michigan State ===
	1	2	3	4	Total
Spartans	17	7	10	3	37
Wildcats	0	7	10	3	20

=== Purdue ===
	1	2	3	4	Total
Boilermakers	6	6	0	14	26
Wildcats	0	24	10	14	48

=== Indiana ===
	1	2	3	4	Total
Wildcats	3	6	10	0	19
Hoosiers	7	7	7	0	21

=== Minnesota ===
	1	2	3	4	Total
Wildcats	10	7	0	7	24
Golden Gophers	0	17	0	0	17

=== Ohio State ===
	1	2	3	4	Total
Buckeyes	7	17	7	14	45
Wildcats	7	0	3	0	10

=== Michigan ===
	1	2	3	4	Total
Wildcats	7	0	14	0	21
Wolverines	7	7	0	0	14

=== Illinois ===
	1	2	3	4	Total
Fighting Illini	0	0	7	3	10
Wildcats	6	7	3	11	27

=== Alamo Bowl, v. Missouri ===
	1	2	3	4	OT	Total
Tigers	0	10	10	3	7	30
Wildcats	7	3	13	0	0	23

== Rankings ==
Ranking movements Legend: ██ Increase in ranking ██ Decrease in ranking — = Not ranked RV = Received votes
	Week																
Poll	Pre	1	2	3	4	5	6	7	8	9	10	11	12	13	14	15	Final
AP	—	—	—	RV	RV	RV	RV	RV	RV	RV	RV	RV	RV	24	24	22	RV
Coaches	—	—	RV	RV	RV	RV	22	RV	24	RV	25	RV	24	20	22	20	RV
Harris	Not released						23	RV	RV	RV	RV	RV	RV	24	22	21	Not released
BCS	Not released								22	—	24	—	—	24	22	23	Not released

== Statistics ==
=== Team ===
	Team	Opp
Scoring		
Points per game		
First downs		
Rushing		
Passing		
Penalty		
Total offense		
Avg per play		
Avg per game		
Fumbles-Lost		
Penalties-Yards		
Avg per game		

	Team	Opp
Punts-Yards		
Avg per punt		
Time of possession/Game		
3rd down conversions		
4th down conversions		
Touchdowns scored		
Field goals-Attempts-Long		
PAT-Attempts		
Attendance		
Games/Avg per Game		

==== Scores by quarter ====
	1	2	3	4	Total
Northwestern	52	100	80	62	294
Opponents	64	78	49	41	232

=== Offense ===
==== Rushing ====
Name	GP-GS	Att	Gain	Loss	Net	Avg	TD	Long	Avg/G
TEAM									
Total									
Opponents									

==== Passing ====
Name	CMP	ATT	YDS	CMP%	YPA	LNG	TD	INT	SACK	RAT
C. J. Bachér	218	365	2128	59.7	5.83	53	14	14	9	113.68
Mike Kafka	32	46	330	69.6	7.17	36	2	3	6	131.13
Eric Peterman	2	2	55	100.0	27.50	30	1	0	0	496.0
Total	252	413	2513	61.0	6.08	53	17	17	15	116.9
Opponents										

==== Receiving ====
Name	GP-GS	No.	Yds	Avg	TD	Long	Avg/G
Total							
Opponents							

=== Defense ===
Name	GP	Tackles				Sacks	Pass defense		Interceptions				Fumbles		Blkd Kick
Name	GP	Solo	Ast	Total	TFL-Yds	No-Yds	BrUp	QBH	No.-Yds	Avg	TD	Long	Rcv-Yds	FF	Blkd Kick
Total															

=== Special teams ===
Name	Punting								Kickoffs				
Name	No.	Yds	Avg	Long	TB	FC	I20	Blkd	No.	Yds	Avg	TB	OB
Total													

Name	Punt returns					Kick returns				
Name	No.	Yds	Avg	TD	Long	No.	Yds	Avg	TD	Long
Total										
