= 2008 Alamo Bowl =

2008 Valero Alamo Bowl
| Missouri Tigers | Northwestern Wildcats |
| (9–4) | (9–3) |
| Big 12 | Big Ten |
| 30 | 23 |
| Head coach: Gary Pinkel | Head coach: Pat Fitzgerald |
| AP / Coaches / BCS; 25 / 23 / 21 | AP / Coaches / BCS; 22 / 20 / 23 |
| | 1 | 2 | 3 | 4 | OT | Total |
|---|---|---|---|---|---|---|
| Missouri | 0 | 10 | 10 | 3 | 7 | 30 |
| Northwestern | 7 | 3 | 13 | 0 | 0 | 23 |
- Date: December 29, 2008
- Season: 2008
- Stadium: Alamodome
- Location: San Antonio, Texas
- MVP: Offense: Jeremy Maclin; Defense: Sean Weatherspoon (MIZZ)
- Favorite: Missouri by 12.5
- Referee: Jack Childress (ACC)
- Attendance: 55,986
- Payout: US$2,250,000 million per team

United States TV coverage
- Network: ESPN
- Announcers: Ron Franklin and Ed Cunningham
- Nielsen ratings: 3.9

The 2008 Valero Alamo Bowl was a college football bowl game played on December 29, 2008 in the 65,000-seat Alamodome in San Antonio, Texas, and televised nationally by ESPN. The game was one of the 2008–09 NCAA football bowl games that concluded the 2008 NCAA Division I FBS football season. The 2008 Alamo Bowl was the 16th annual edition of the contest and the second to be sponsored by Valero Energy Corporation. The game pit the Missouri Tigers (9–4) against the Northwestern Wildcats (9–3). The 2008 game was dubbed the Journalism Bowl by some in the media, owing to the nationally recognized journalism programs at each school: the Missouri School of Journalism and the Medill School of Journalism.

== Scoring summary ==
=== First quarter ===
Northwestern's Brian Peters intercepted Missouri quarterback Chase Daniel on the Tigers' first drive. The Wildcats took advantage of the mistake and quarterback C. J. Bachér found a wide-open Eric Peterman for a 35-yard touchdown.

=== Second quarter ===
Missouri and Northwestern traded field goals in the second quarter. With just one minute before halftime, Jeremy Maclin bolted for a 75-yard punt return for a touchdown.

=== Third quarter ===
Bachér found Rasheed Ward for a 46-yard touchdown pass on the first drive of the second half. However, Northwestern's extra point attempt bounced off the right upright, making the score 16–10. Danario Alexander gave Mizzou its first lead of the game with an 11-yard touchdown pass from Daniel with about 7 minutes left in the third. Missouri kicked another field goal later in the quarter. With 31 seconds left in the quarter, Bachér found Ross Lane in the back of the endzone to give Northwestern a 23–20 lead.

=== Fourth quarter ===
Jeff Wolfert made his third field goal of the game with 2:49 remaining to tie the game at 23–23. However, he missed a 44-yard field as time expired, sending the game into overtime.

=== Overtime ===
Missouri started on offense first to begin the overtime period. Daniel threw a 7-yard pass to Maclin to give Missouri a 30–23 lead. Like their offense, Missouri's defense delivered. They forced a back-pedaling Bachér to fumble the ball, leaving Northwestern with a fourth-and-goal from the 32-yard line. Bachér's desperation hail mary was knocked down into the end zone.

Scoring summary

| Quarter | Time | Drive | | | Team | Scoring information | Score | |
| Quarter | Time | Plays | Yards | TOP | Team | Scoring information | MIZZ | NU |
|---|---|---|---|---|---|---|---|---|
| 1 | 9:30 | | 60 | 2:26 | NU | Eric Peterman 35-yard touchdown reception from C. J. Bachér, Amado Villarreal kick good | 0 | 7 |
| 2 | 14:49 | | 72 | 3:44 | MIZZ | 31-yard field goal by Jeff Wolfert | 3 | 7 |
| 2 | 9:11 | | 72 | 5:33 | NU | 21-yard field goal by Amado Villarreal | 3 | 10 |
| 2 | 1:00 | | 75 | 0:00 | MIZZ | Stefan Demos punt for 36 yards, returned by Jeremy Maclin for 75 yards for a touchdown, Jeff Wolfert kick good | 10 | 10 |
| 3 | 12:08 | | 80 | 2:47 | NU | Rasheed Ward 46-yard touchdown reception from C. J. Bachér, Amado Villarreal kick no good | 10 | 16 |
| 3 | 7:20 | | 63 | 4:44 | MIZZ | Danario Alexander 11-yard touchdown reception from Chase Daniel, Jeff Wolfert kick good | 17 | 16 |
| 3 | 3:46 | | 5 | 1:06 | MIZZ | 43-yard field goal by Jeff Wolfert | 20 | 16 |
| 3 | 0:31 | | 24 | 1:05 | NU | Ross Lane 23-yard touchdown reception from C. J. Bachér, Amado Villarreal kick good | 20 | 23 |
| 4 | 2:49 | | 33 | 3:07 | MIZZ | 37-yard field goal by Jeff Wolfert | 23 | 23 |
| OT | 15:00 | | 25 | 0:00 | MIZZ | Jeremy Maclin 7-yard touchdown reception from Chase Daniel, Jeff Wolfert kick good | 30 | 23 |
| "TOP" = time of possession. For other American football terms, see Glossary of American football. | | | | | | | 30 | 23 |
