= Dwight McLean =

American football player (born 1988)

No. 21
- Position: Defensive back

Personal information
- Born: October 28, 1988 (age 38); Corona, California, U.S.
- Listed height: 6 ft 1 in (1.85 m)
- Listed weight: 205 lb (93 kg)

Career information
- High school: Corona (CA) Santiago
- College: Purdue
- NFL draft: 2010: undrafted

Career history
- San Jose SaberCats (2011); Arizona Rattlers (2012); San Antonio Talons (2012); New Orleans VooDoo (2013); Portland Thunder (2014); Las Vegas Outlaws (2015); Portland Thunder/Steel (2015–2016); Ottawa Redblacks (2016)*
- * Offseason or practice squad member only

Career AFL statistics
- Total tackles: 349.5
- Forced fumbles: 8
- Fumble recoveries: 2
- Pass deflections: 51
- Interceptions: 10
- Stats at ArenaFan.com

Dwight George McLean (born on October 28, 1988) is an American former football defensive back. He played college football at Purdue University.

== Early life ==
McLean attended Santiago High School in Corona, California.

== College career ==
=== Fullerton College ===
After high school McLean attended Fullerton College

College recruiting
Name	Hometown	School	Height	Weight	40^{‡}	Commit date
Dwight McLean; S	Corona, California	Fullerton College	6 ft 3 in (1.91 m)	205 lb (93 kg)	4.6	Feb 26, 2008
Dwight McLean; S	Recruit ratings: Scout: Rivals: (JC)					
Overall recruit ranking: Scout: -- (S) Rivals: -- (S), -- (CA) ESPN: -- (S)
Note: In many cases, Scout, Rivals, 247Sports, On3, and ESPN may conflict in their listings of height and weight.; In these cases, the average was taken. ESPN grades are on a 100-point scale.; Sources: "Purdue Football Commitment List (26)". Rivals.; "Purdue College Football Recruiting Commits". Scout.; "ESPN". ESPN.; "Scout.com Team Recruiting Rankings". Scout.; "2008 Team Ranking". Rivals.com.

McLean committed to Purdue University on February 26, 2008. McLean was not heavily recruited, only landing football scholarships from 3 FBS schools (New Mexico State, San Diego State and Purdue).

=== Purdue ===
McLean's play netted him a scholarship to continue his football career at Purdue University. He was named a starting safety midway through the season in 2008, and was a starter in 2009.

== Professional career ==
=== San Jose SaberCats ===
McLean signed with the San Jose SaberCats of the Arena Football League in 2011. McLean lead the SaberCats with 80 tackles on the season.

=== Arizona Rattlers ===
In 2012, McLean was assigned to the Arizona Rattlers. McLean was later released before the season ended.

=== San Antonio Talons ===
Later in 2012b McLean was assigned to the San Antonio Talons. McLean helped the Talons finish the season with a 14–2 record, but the Talons fell short of the ArenaBowl.

=== New Orleans VooDoo ===
8 weeks into the 2013 season, McLean was assigned to the New Orleans VooDoo.

=== Portland Thunder ===
On December 20, 2013, McLean was selected by the Portland Thunder in the 2014 AFL Expansion Draft.

=== Las Vegas Outlaws ===
On November 5, 2014, McLean was assigned to the Las Vegas Outlaws. He was placed on recallable reassignment on May 26, 2015.

=== Return to Portland ===
On June 3, 2015, McLean was assigned to the Portland Thunder.
