= Elizabeth Moreau =

- Born: November 30, 1982 (age 43); Indianapolis, Indiana
- Education: Butler University (2005)
- Occupation: Reporter
- Height: 6 ft 1 in (1.85 m)

Elizabeth Moreau is a reporter and host for Fox Sports South. In addition to her work with Fox, she is also a host at the ACC digital network.

== Biography ==
Moreau graduated from Brebeuf Jesuit Preparatory School, Indianapolis, Indiana in 2001. She was a four-year varsity letter winner in Women's Volleyball, and earned first team all-county and all-state honors and other awards for her volleyball skills. After graduation, she attended Butler University in Indianapolis, where she was a political science and public relations major. She also continued playing Women's Volleyball as a scholarship athlete and was four-year letter winner until her graduation in 2005.

== Professional career ==
After graduation from Butler, Moreau began a career in sports reporting. She initially worked at the Big Ten Network as a production assistant, and later worked as a sideline reporter for Big Ten football and basketball and as a studio analyst for volleyball. She then moved to ESPN as a college football sideline reporter, volleyball analyst, and track and field reporter.

Currently, Moreau works for Fox Sports South as a host and social media reporter for SEC Gridiron Live, a sideline reporter for Southeastern Conference (SEC) football coverage, and a social media reporter for the Atlanta Braves Live pre and postgame show.
