= 2009 Capital One Bowl =

American college football game

Georgia Bulldogs	Michigan State Spartans
(9–3)	(9–3)
SEC	Big Ten
24	12
Head coach: Mark Richt	Head coach: Mark Dantonio
AP / Coaches / BCS; 16 / 17 / 15	AP / Coaches / BCS; 19 / 18 / 18
	1	2	3	4	Total
Georgia	3	0	14	7	24
Michigan State	3	3	0	6	12
- Date: January 1, 2009
- Season: 2008
- Stadium: Florida Citrus Bowl
- Location: Orlando, Florida
- MVP: Matthew Stafford (Georgia QB)
- Favorite: Georgia by 8.5
- Referee: Karl Richins (Big 12)
- Attendance: 59,681
- Payout: US$4.25 million per team

United States TV coverage
- Network: ABC
- Announcers: Mike Patrick, Todd Blackledge
- Nielsen ratings: 6.4 (10.8 mil. viewers)

The 2009 Capital One Bowl was held on January 1, 2009 at the Citrus Bowl in Orlando, Florida. The Georgia Bulldogs of the Southeastern Conference defeated the Michigan State Spartans of the Big Ten Conference by a score of 24–12. The game was televised to a national audience on ABC. The game was supposed to be a "showdown" between MSU RB Javon Ringer and Georgia RB Knowshon Moreno, but both players combined for only 43 carries and 109 yards, with Ringer scoring on a rushing touchdown and Moreno on a receiving.

== Game summary ==
=== First half ===
The Bulldogs scored the first points of the game when Blair Walsh connected on a 32 yd field goal early in the first quarter. Michigan State would answer with a 20-yard field goal by Brett Swenson with 4:50 left in the first quarter. The Spartans would take the lead late in the second quarter with a 32 yd field goal of their own. Despite multiple turnovers neither Michigan State or Georgia could score a touchdown in the first half and Michigan State would take a 6–3 lead into halftime.

=== Second half ===
Both teams continued to struggle offensively until Georgia drove 96 yards and scored on a Matthew Stafford 35-yard touchdown pass to Michael Moore with 3:31 left in the third quarter. After forcing Michigan State to punt on their next possession, Georgia would score another touchdown off a 21-yard Matthew Stafford pass, this time to Aron White right before the end of the third quarter. Michigan State would pull within a touchdown after Javon Ringer finally found the end zone for the Spartans with 8:50 left in the fourth quarter. Michigan State attempted a two-point conversion to try to pull within three points of Georgia, however the attempt failed with an incomplete pass. This made the score 17–12. After a short possession by Georgia, Michigan State would get the ball back and would drive into Georgia territory, but turned the ball over on a failed fourth down conversion attempt. Georgia would seal the game when Knowshon Moreno scored on a 21-yard touchdown pass from Stafford with just 3:43 left in the fourth quarter.

== Scoring summary ==
Quarter	Time	Drive		Team	Scoring Information	Score	
Quarter	Time	Length	Time	Team	Scoring Information	Georgia	Michigan State
1	9:26	8 plays, 48 yards	2:39	Georgia	Blair Walsh 32–yard field goal	3	0
1	4:50	4 plays, 3 yards	1:25	Michigan State	Brett Swenson 20–yard field goal	3	3
2	2:14	10 plays, 24 yards	4:45	Michigan State	Brett Swenson 32–yard field goal	3	6
3	3:31	10 plays, 96 yards	5:51	Georgia	Michael Moore 35–yard reception from Matthew Stafford, Blair Walsh kick good	10	6
3	0:09	1 play, 21 yards	0:06	Georgia	Aron White 21–yard reception from Matthew Stafford, Blair Walsh kick good	17	6
4	8:50	10 plays, 54 yards	2:20	Michigan State	Javon Ringer 1–yard rush, Brian Hoyer pass failed	17	12
4	3:43	11 plays, 67 yards	5:03	Georgia	Knowshon Moreno 21–yard reception from Matthew Stafford, Blair Walsh kick good	24	12
Final Score						24	12
