= Demetrius Crawford =

American gridiron football player (born 1986)

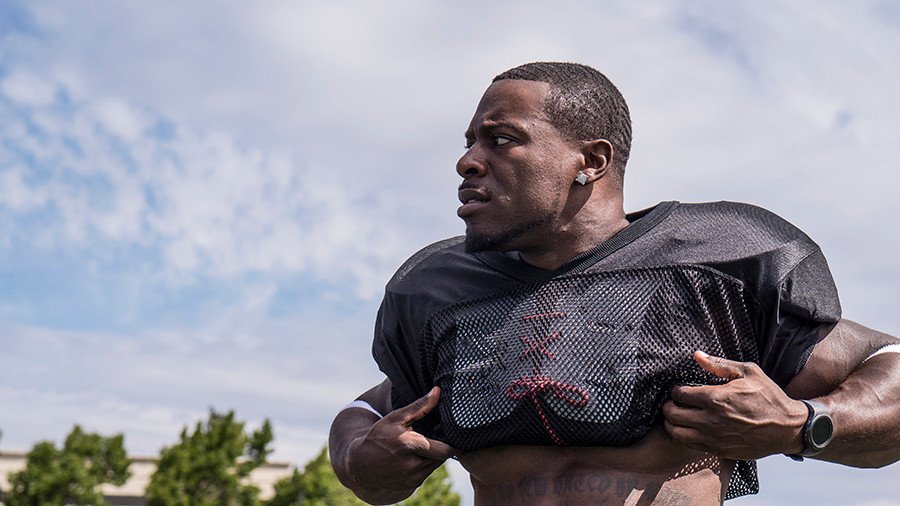

Profile
- Position: Running back

Personal information
- Born: December 30, 1986 (age 39); Oakland, California, U.S.
- Listed height: 5 ft 9 in (1.75 m)
- Listed weight: 195 lb (88 kg)

Career information
- High school: Vanden (Fairfield, California)
- College: Montana State
- NFL draft: 2009: undrafted

Career history
- Tri-Cities Fever (2010); BC Lions (2010)*; Saskatchewan Roughriders (2012)*
- * Offseason or practice squad member only

Awards and highlights
- First-team All-Big Sky (2008); Second-team All-Big Sky (2007)

Demetrius Deron Crawford (born December 30, 1986) is an American former football running back. He played college football at Montana State.

== Early life ==
Crawford attended Vanden High School in Fairfield, California. In 2002 Crawford started at Cornerback as a sophomore earning 96 tackles. Crawford Rushed for 1,300 yards as a junior and 1,500 yards as a senior. In 2003 Crawford rushed for 336 yards and five touchdowns in a game against Angelo Rodriguez High School where he played against friend Stevie Johnson. Crawford earned CVC offensive back of the year honors as a junior and Red Zone Player of the Year honors in his senior season in 2005. Crawford was a 3-year Varsity letterman.

== College career ==
Crawford attended City College of San Francisco in 2005 and Sacramento City College in 2006 before transferring to Montana State University. In his first season with the program, he gained 868 yards on the season, with 5 touchdowns also caught 35 passes for 285 yards and 2 touchdowns. Crawford was selected to the Second Team All-Big Sky in 2007. The 2008 season was extraordinary for Crawford as he rushed for 1,314 yards, and 8 touchdowns. Crawford also had 100-yard kickoff return for a touchdown against Minnesota. Crawford put together the fifth-best rushing season in school history. Crawford's 2,182 career rushing yards moved him into seventh in school history. Crawford became the first Bobcat since 2001 to have a 1,000 yard season. Crawford was the first Bobcat running back to earn First Team All-Big Sky honors since 2002. Crawford also was a two-time Big Sky Conference Player of the Week.

=== Career statistics ===
College Statistics from ESPN.com

==== Rushing ====
Year	Team	Carries	Yards	Average	Long	TDs
2007	MTST	176	868	4.9	17	5
2008	MTST	251	1,314	5.2	84	8

==== Receiving ====
Year	Team	Receptions	Yards	Average	Long	TDs
2007	MTST	35	285	8.1	8	2
2008	MTST	18	101	5.6	16	0

==== Kick returns ====
Year	Team	Returns	Yards	Average	Long	TDs
2007	MTST	1	26	26.0	26	0
2008	MTST	10	295	29.5	100	1

== Professional career ==
After going undrafted in 2009, Crawford played in the Indoor Football League with the Tri-Cities Fever for the 2010 football season. Crawford played only two games before getting a contract with the BC Lions of the Canadian Football League but was unable to participate in camp due to injury.

After spending a year out of football, Crawford put out a motivational video with amateur film-maker Eric Gomes on YouTube entitled #DreamChasersNeverSleep. The video shows Crawford working out in the weight room, on the football field, and a beach. Crawford took to Twitter where he sent out this video to different teams, specifically the Saskatchewan Roughriders, hoping to gain interest. He was signed by the Roughriders on February 10, 2012. He was released on June 16, 2012.
