= Pam Ward =

Broadcaster

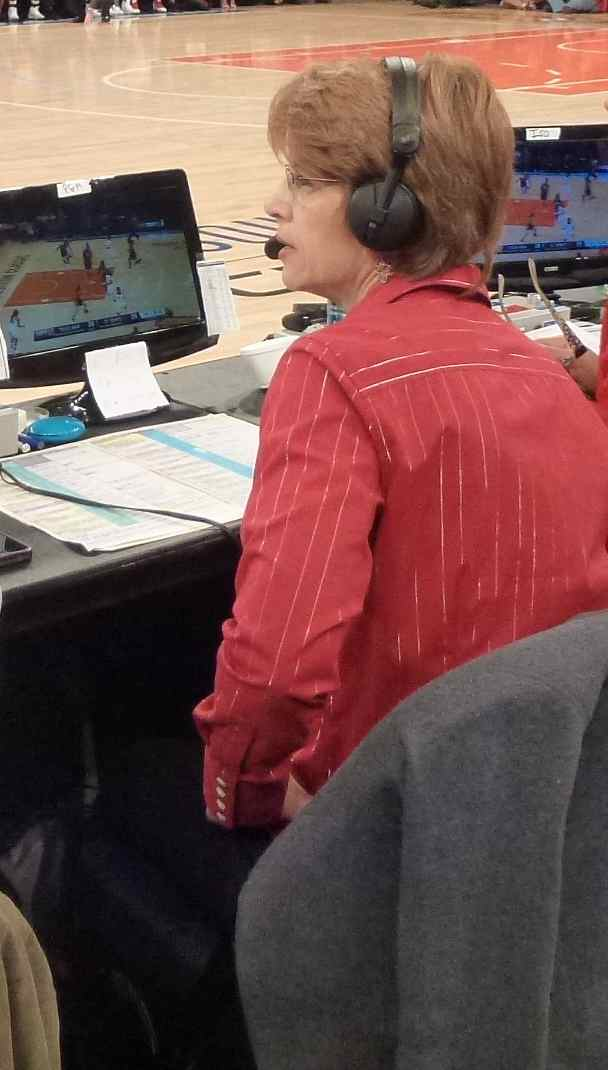
Pam Ward calling the Maggie Dixon Classic basketball game in Madison Square Garden

Pam Ward is an American television sportscaster. She worked for ESPN from 1996 to 2025, serving as a play-by-play announcer for women's college basketball, college softball, the WNBA, and college football. In 2000, Ward became the first woman to call a nationally televised NCAA Division I football game.

She is a graduate of the University of Maryland, College Park with a degree in communications.

Prior to ESPN, Ward worked as an anchor/host for WTEM between April 1992 and March 1995 and then WBAL between March 1995 and 1996.

In 2000, Ward became the first woman to perform play-by-play announcing for an NCAA football nationally televised game.

== Departure from ESPN ==
Ward left ESPN in December 2025 after nearly three decades with the network.< In January 2026, she said that she did not consider herself fully retired and remained interested in calling WNBA games for another broadcaster.
