= 2008 Boston College Eagles football team =

American college football season

2008 Boston College Eagles football
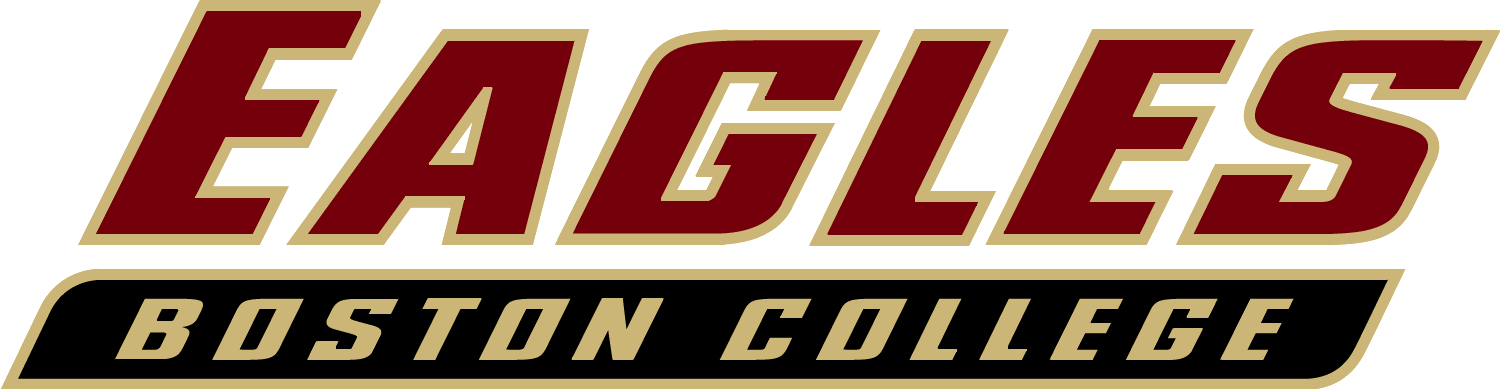

ACC Atlantic Division co-champion

ACC Championship Game, L 12–30 vs. Virginia Tech

Music City Bowl, L 14–16 vs. Vanderbilt
- Conference: Atlantic Coast Conference
- Atlantic Division
- Record: 9–5 (5–3 ACC)
- Head coach: Jeff Jagodzinski (2nd season)
- Offensive coordinator: Steve Logan (2nd season)
- Offensive scheme: Pro-style
- Defensive coordinator: Frank Spaziani (10th season)
- Base defense: 4–3
- Captains: Chris Crane; Mike McLaughlin
- Home stadium: Alumni Stadium

2008 Atlantic Coast Conference football standings
	Conf.			Overall
Team	W		L	W		L
Atlantic Division
Boston College xy	5	–	3	9	–	5
No. 21 Florida State x	5	–	3	9	–	4
Maryland	4	–	4	8	–	5
Wake Forest	4	–	4	8	–	5
Clemson	4	–	4	7	–	6
NC State	4	–	4	6	–	7
Coastal Division
No. 15 Virginia Tech xy$	5	–	3	10	–	4
No. 22 Georgia Tech x	5	–	3	9	–	4
North Carolina	0	–	4	0	–	5
Miami (FL)	4	–	4	7	–	6
Virginia	3	–	5	5	–	7
Duke	1	–	7	4	–	8
Championship: Virginia Tech 30, Boston College 12
$ – BCS representative as conference champion; x – Division champion/co-champions; y – Championship game participant; North Carolina vacated 8 wins, including 4 ACC wins; Rankings from AP Poll

The 2008 Boston College Eagles football team represented Boston College during the 2008 NCAA Division I FBS football season. It was Boston College's fourth season as a member of the Atlantic Coast Conference (ACC). The Eagles were led by Jeff Jagodzinski in his second and final season as Boston College head coach. Boston College has been a member of the Atlantic Coast Conference's (ACC) Atlantic Division since joining the league in 2005, after leaving the Big East Conference. The Eagles played their home games in 2008 at Alumni Stadium in Chestnut Hill, Massachusetts, which has been their home stadium since 1957.

== Season recap ==
Boston College had to replace Matt Ryan, who was drafted third overall in the 2008 NFL draft by the Atlanta Falcons. Senior quarterback Chris Crane was the starter at the beginning of the year to take over the starting quarterback position. In the November 22 game against Wake Forest, Crane broke his collar bone, and was replaced with Dominique Davis. Other big losses that had to be dealt with from the 2007 season include tailback L.V. Witworth and running back Andre Callender. True freshman Josh Haden was assumed to be the starting running back, but true freshman Montel Harris later turned out to have the starting job. BC finished the year with one of the best defenses in College Football, with the most Interceptions in all of FBS Football, and allowing the fifth fewest yards.

The team had its first loss in a home game against Georgia Tech. It went on to lose two more games against the North Carolina and the Clemson before winning four games in a row to take the team to its second ACC Championship Game in a row, which again, put the Eagles against the Virginia Tech Hokies. The Eagles lost the game 12–30, and placed the team in the Gaylord Hotels Music City Bowl in Nashville, Tennessee. The Eagles lost the game to Vanderbilt, which not only ended the Eagles bowl winning streak, which was the longest in the nation, but gave Vanderbilt its first bowl win in over 50 years. On January 5, 2009, Coach Jagodzinski was fired by Boston College, for apparently interviewing for the head coaching vacancy for the NFL New York Jets despite being warned not to. He was later hired as the offensive coordinator for the Tampa Bay Buccaneers.

== Schedule ==
Date	Time	Opponent	Rank	Site	TV	Result	Attendance	Source
August 30	6:30 p.m.	vs. Kent State*		Cleveland Browns Stadium; Cleveland, OH (FirstMerit Patriot Bowl)	ESPNU	W 21–0	10,788	
September 6	12:00 p.m.	Georgia Tech		Alumni Stadium; Chestnut Hill, MA	Raycom	L 16–19	40,106	
September 20	1:00 p.m.	UCF*		Alumni Stadium; Chestnut Hill, MA	ESPNU	W 34–7	41,267	
September 27	1:00 p.m.	Rhode Island*		Alumni Stadium; Chestnut Hill, MA	ESPN360	W 42–0	32,628	
October 4	12:00 p.m.	at NC State		Carter–Finley Stadium; Raleigh, NC	Raycom	W 38–31	55,652	
October 18	8:00 p.m.	No. 17 Virginia Tech		Alumni Stadium; Chestnut Hill, MA (rivalry)	ESPN2	W 28–23	44,127	
October 25	12:00 p.m.	at North Carolina	No. 23	Kenan Memorial Stadium; Chapel Hill, NC	Raycom	L 24–45	48,000	
November 1	3:30 p.m.	Clemson		Alumni Stadium; Chestnut Hill, MA (O'Rourke–McFadden Trophy)	ESPNU	L 21–27	41,863	
November 8	8:00 p.m.	Notre Dame*		Alumni Stadium; Chestnut Hill, MA (Holy War)	ESPN	W 17–0	44,500	
November 15	8:00 p.m.	at No. 20 Florida State		Doak Campbell Stadium; Tallahassee, FL	ABC	W 27–17	79,792	
November 22	3:30 p.m.	at Wake Forest		BB&T Field; Winston-Salem, NC	ABC	W 24–21	30,373	
November 29	3:30 p.m.	Maryland	No. 20	Alumni Stadium; Chestnut Hill, MA	ABC	W 28–21	42,767	
December 6	1:00 p.m.	vs. Virginia Tech	No. 18	Raymond James Stadium; Tampa, FL (ACC Championship)	ABC	L 12–30	53,927	
December 31	3:30 p.m.	vs. Vanderbilt		LP Field; Nashville, TN (Music City Bowl)	ESPN	L 14–16	54,250	
*Non-conference game; Rankings from AP Poll released prior to the game; All times are in Eastern time

== Rankings ==
Ranking movements Legend: ██ Increase in ranking ██ Decrease in ranking — = Not ranked RV = Received votes
	Week																
Poll	Pre	1	2	3	4	5	6	7	8	9	10	11	12	13	14	15	Final
AP	RV	RV	RV	RV	RV	RV	RV	RV	23	RV	RV	RV	RV	20	18	RV	RV
Coaches Poll	—	—	—	—	—	—	—	—	—	RV	RV	RV	25	22	20	RV	RV
Harris	Not released					—	—	—	24	—	—	—	25	20	19	—	Not released
BCS	Not released								—	—	—	—	—	21	17	24	Not released

== Roster ==
2008 Boston College Eagles football roster
Quarterbacks: 7 Justin Tuggle, Fr.; 10 Chris Crane, r-Sr.; 14 Alexander Atiyeh, Fr.; 15 Dominique Davis, r-Fr.; 17 Chris Johnson, r-Jr.; 19 Nick Loury, Fr.; 21 John Lowell, So.; Running backs: 6 Josh Haden, Fr. (HB); 8 Jeff Smith, Jr. (HB); 13 Codi Boek, So. (FB); 24 Dan Mulrooney, So. (HB); 33 Dan Williams, r-Fr. (FB); 36 James McCluskey, r-So. (FB); 40 Jerry Kelly, Fr. (HB); 41 Montel Harris, Fr. (HB); Wide receivers: 2 Brandon Robinson, r-Sr.; 3 Ifeanyi Momah, So.; 5 Ryan Lindsey, r-So.; 11 Clarence Megwa, r-Jr.; 14 Billy Flutie, r-So.; 18 Rich Gunnell, r-Jr.; 25 John Hovsepian, Sr.; 82 Justin Jarvis, Jr.; 85 Clyde Lee, Fr.; 89 Colin Larmond Jr., Fr.; Tight ends: 49 Gavin Lamb, Fr.; 80 Ryan Purvis, r-Sr.; 81 Chris Pantale, Fr.; 84 Michael Stone, Fr.; 87 Lars Anderson, r-Fr.; 88 Jordon McMichael, r-So.	Offensive linemen: 62 Bryan Murphy, r-Sr. (C); 64 Nick Rossi, r-Jr. (OG); 65 Matt Tennant, r-Jr. (C); 66 Rich Lapham, r-So. (OT); 69 Mark Spinney, r-Fr. (C); 70 John Elliott, r-Fr. (OG); 71 Nick Halloran, Fr. (OG); 72 Mike Goodman Jr., r-Fr. (OL); 73 Clif Ramsey, r-Sr. (OG); 74 Anthony Castonzo, So. (OT); 75 Nathan Richman, r-Fr. (OT); 76 Patrick Sheil, r-Jr. (OT); 77 Emmett Cleary, Fr. (OT); 78 Thomas Claiborne, r-So. (OG); Defensive linemen: 47 Brad Newman, So. (DE); 52 Austin Giles, r-Jr. (DE); 55 Damik Scafe, r-So. (DT); 56 Max Holloway, Fr. (DE); 58 Bill Ferguson, Jr. (DT); 60 Ron Brace, r-Sr. (DT); 86 Jim Ramella, Jr. (DE); 90 B. J. Raji, Sr. (DT); 91 Christian Klein, Fr. (DE); 92 Allan Smith, r-Jr. (DE); 93 Bryan Murray, Fr. (DT); 95 Brendan Deska, r-Jr. (DE); 96 Kaleb Ramsey, Fr. (DT); 98 Alex Albright, Jr. (DE); 99 Jerry Willette, r-Sr. (DT)	Linebackers: 7 Kevin Akins, r-Sr.; 16 Brian Toal, Sr.; 34 Mike McLaughlin, r-Jr.; 35 Robert Francois, r-Sr.; 36 Kevin Distaso, r-Jr.; 37 Jarick Walker, So.; 39 Darius Bagan, r-So.; 44 Alexander DiSanzo, Fr.; 49 Garrett Seeger, Sr.; 50 Will Thompson, r-Fr.; 51 Corey Phelps, Jr.; 53 Mike Morrissey, r-So.; 54 Nick Clancy, Fr.; 59 John Chisholm, r-So.; 94 Mark Herzlich, Jr.; 98 Alex Albright, Jr.; Defensive backs: 4 Donnie Fletcher, Fr. (CB); 8 Marcellus Bowman, r-Jr. (FS); 9 DeLeon Gause, So. (CB); 19 Paul Anderson, Sr. (SS); 20 Roderick Rollins, Jr. (CB); 21 Razzie Smith, r-Jr. (CB); 23 Hampton Hughes, Fr. (DB); 25 Chris Fox, r-So. (SS); 26 Kurtis Magee, Sr. (DB); 27 Okechukwu Okoroha, Fr. (DB); 28 Ugo Okpara, Fr. (CB); 29 Dominick LeGrande, Fr. (SS); 30 Donte Elliott, Fr. (S); 32 Chris Hayden-Martin, Fr. (CB); 38 Mark Maglio, r-Jr. (CB); 42 Isaac Johnson, Fr. (CB); 43 Michael Dell'Aquila, r-So. (DB); 45 Wes Davis, So. (FS); 48 Steve Atkinson, Fr. (DB)	Special teams: 14 Billy Flutie, r-So. (P); 19 Nick Loury, Fr. (LS); 23 Billy Bennett, So. (K); 36 Kevin Distaso, r-Jr. (LS); 43 Gerald Levano, Fr. (K/P); 46 Ryan Quigley, Fr. (P/K); 51 Jack Geiser, Jr. (LS); 53 Greg Abilheira, r-So. (K); 57 Sean Flaherty, Fr. (LS); 58 Jason Stewart, Sr. (LS); 83 Steve Aponavicius, Sr. (K); Head coach: Jeff Jagodzinski; Assistant coaches: Jack Bicknell Jr. – Assistant head coach/offensive line; Jeff Comissiong – Defensive line coach; Ryan Day – Wide receivers coach; Steve Logan – Offensive coordinator; Bill McGovern – Linebackers coach; Mike Siravo – Defensive backs/recruiting coordinator; Ben Sirmans – Running backs coach; Frank Spaziani – Defensive coordinator; Don Yanowsky – Tight ends/special teams coach

== Drafted Players (2009 NFL Draft) ==
2009	1	9	9	B. J. Raji	Green Bay Packers	DT
2009	2	8	40	Ron Brace	New England Patriots	DT
