= 2008 ACC Championship Game =

2008 Dr. Pepper ACC Championship Game
- Conference Championship
Boston College Eagles	Virginia Tech Hokies
(9–3)	(8–4)
12	30
Head coach: Jeff Jagodzinski	Head coach: Frank Beamer
AP / Coaches / BCS; 18 / 20 / 17	BCS 25
	1	2	3	4	Total
Boston College	0	7	0	5	12
Virginia Tech	7	7	10	6	30
- Date: December 6, 2008
- Season: 2008
- Stadium: Raymond James Stadium
- Location: Tampa, Florida
- MVP: QB Tyrod Taylor (Va. Tech)
- Favorite: Virginia Tech by 1
- Referee: Tom Zimorski
- Halftime show: Dr Pepper "Get More From Gameday" promotion
- Attendance: 27,360

United States TV coverage
- Network: ABC
- Announcers: Brad Nessler, Paul Maguire, Todd Harris, and Bob Griese
- Nielsen ratings: 2.9

The 2008 ACC Championship Game was a college football game between the Virginia Tech Hokies and the Boston College Eagles. The game, sponsored by Dr Pepper, was the final regular-season contest of the 2008 college football season for the Atlantic Coast Conference. Virginia Tech defeated Boston College, winning the Atlantic Coast Conference football championship, 30–12. Until 2021, this was the last ACC Championship Game to not feature Clemson or Florida State from the Atlantic Division.

The Virginia Tech Hokies were selected to represent the Coastal Division by virtue of a tie-breaking head-to-head victory against division rival Georgia Tech and came into the game with an 8–4 record (5–3 in ACC play). Representing the Atlantic Division was Boston College, which had a 9–3 record (5–3 ACC). The two teams were the victors of a closely contested season in the ACC. Neither team clinched a spot in the game until the final week before the championship, and both had to rely on conference tie-breaking rules to earn a spot. The game was a rematch of the previous year's contest, which Virginia Tech won, 30–16.

The game was held at Raymond James Stadium in Tampa, Florida on December 6, 2008. Tampa had been chosen after poor attendance at the game's previous spot (Jacksonville, Florida) led conference officials to move the game. The 2008 championship was the first to be played in Tampa. The game began slowly, as both teams punted after their opening possessions failed to gain a first down. Later in the quarter, Virginia Tech took a 7–0 lead with a five-yard touchdown run by Tech quarterback Tyrod Taylor. The Hokies never relinquished the lead after that point. Tech extended its lead to 14–0 in the second quarter, but Boston College managed to narrow Tech's lead to 14–7 by halftime. In the second half, Virginia Tech scored 17 points to the Eagles' five, and the Hokies won the game. In recognition of his game-winning performance, Taylor was named the game's most valuable player.

== Selection process ==
The ACC Championship Game matches the winners of the Coastal and Atlantic divisions of the Atlantic Coast Conference. In the first decade of the 21st century, the league underwent an expansion to add three former Big East members: Miami and Virginia Tech in 2004, and Boston College in 2005. With the addition of a twelfth team, the ACC was allowed to hold a conference championship game under National Collegiate Athletic Association (NCAA) rules.

The inaugural 2005 game featured a Florida State win over Virginia Tech, 27–22. In 2006, two different teams made their first appearances in the game, which was held in Jacksonville, Florida. Wake Forest defeated Georgia Tech, 9–6. In 2007, one team new to the championship game and championship-game veteran featured in the contest as Virginia Tech faced off against Boston College. The game resulted in a 30–16 Virginia Tech victory.

=== Site selection ===
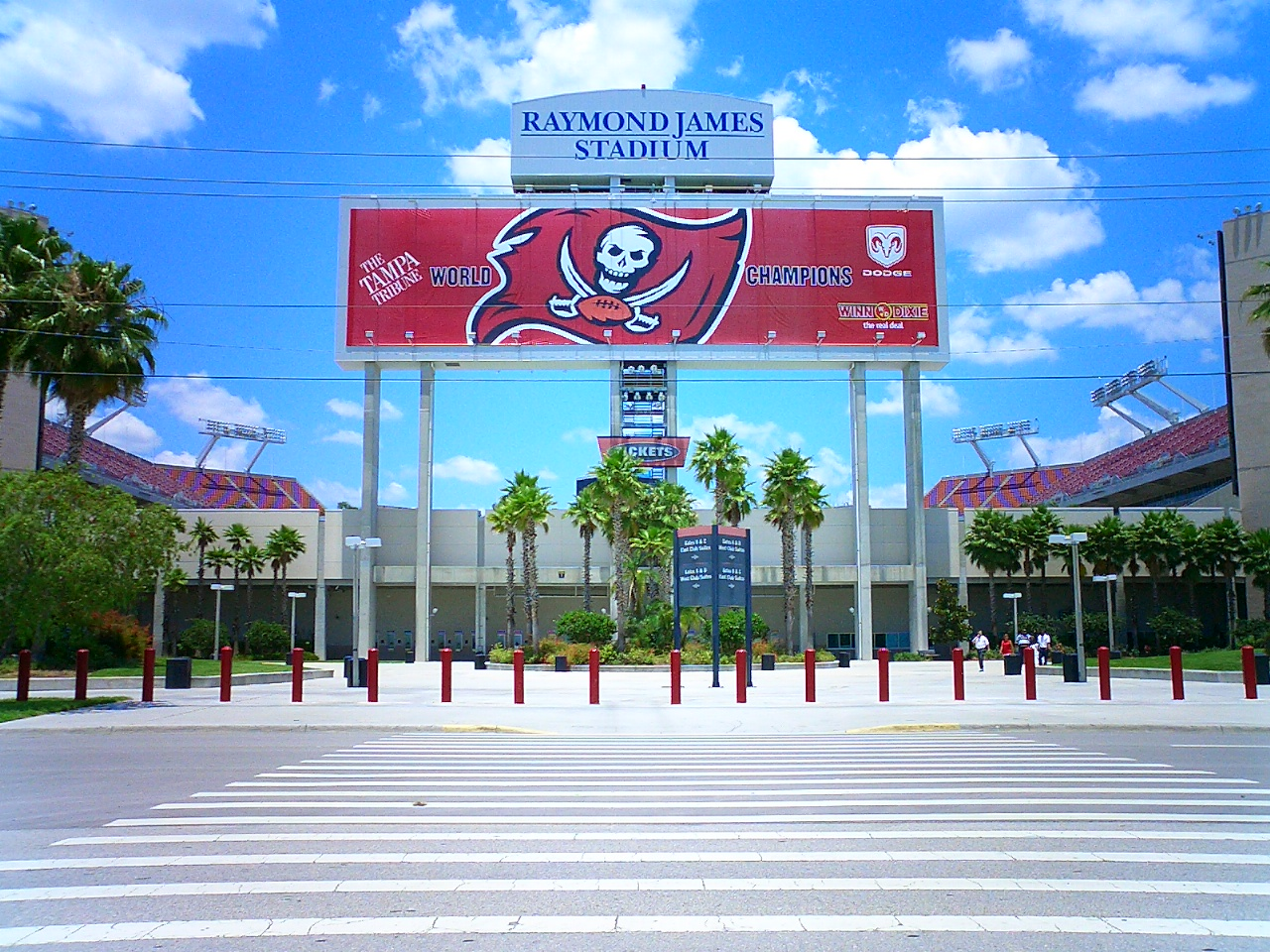
Raymond James Stadium in Tampa, Florida

Before the 2007 game, cities other than Jacksonville (site of the 2007 ACC Championship Game) presented their plans to be the site of the 2008 ACC Championship Game. After poor attendance in the ACC Championship Game at Jacksonville for the second straight year, ACC officials and representatives of the conference's member schools elected not to extend the Gator Bowl Association's contract to host the game for another year. On December 12, less than two weeks after Jacksonville had hosted the 2007 ACC Championship Game, the ACC announced that Tampa, Florida would host the game in 2008 and 2009 and Charlotte, North Carolina would host the game in 2010 and 2011.

The cities were chosen based on bids presented to the ACC and its member schools. Each city requested and was granted a two-year contract, locking the ACC into the locations well in advance. Tampa was chosen as the site of the 2008 game because Charlotte was scheduled to hold the annual convention of the Association for Career and Technical Education at the same time as the game, and adequate hotel space would not be ready in time for the two events. Because of this, Charlotte's two-year span of hosting the game was pushed back to 2010.

=== Team selection ===
2008 Atlantic Coast Conference football standings
	Conf.			Overall
Team	W		L	W		L
Atlantic Division
Boston College xy	5	–	3	9	–	5
No. 21 Florida State x	5	–	3	9	–	4
Maryland	4	–	4	8	–	5
Wake Forest	4	–	4	8	–	5
Clemson	4	–	4	7	–	6
NC State	4	–	4	6	–	7
Coastal Division
No. 15 Virginia Tech xy$	5	–	3	10	–	4
No. 22 Georgia Tech x	5	–	3	9	–	4
North Carolina	0	–	4	0	–	5
Miami (FL)	4	–	4	7	–	6
Virginia	3	–	5	5	–	7
Duke	1	–	7	4	–	8
Championship: Virginia Tech 30, Boston College 12
$ – BCS representative as conference champion; x – Division champion/co-champions; y – Championship game participant; North Carolina vacated 8 wins, including 4 ACC wins; Rankings from AP Poll

Before the beginning of the 2008 college football season, the annual poll by media members who cover ACC football predicted Clemson to win the Atlantic Division and Virginia Tech to win the Coastal Division. Clemson received 59 of a possible 65 first-place votes in its division, while Virginia Tech received 58.

From the first game of the season, however, those preseason predictions were cast into doubt. Virginia Tech lost its season opener to lightly regarded East Carolina, while Clemson lost to Alabama. Though neither loss factored into either team's conference standings, it reflected the early stages of a conference schedule that was regarded as crazy, wacky, "a mess", and "confusing" by members of the media and college football fans. So closely matched were the 12 teams of the conference that as late as the second-to-last week of the regular season, nine teams were still in the running for a place in the championship game. Heading into the final week of the regular season, four teams were still in position to potentially participate in the game: Georgia Tech and Virginia Tech from the Coastal Division, and Boston College and Florida State from the Atlantic Division. In that final week, Virginia Tech clinched the Coastal Division co-championship with a 17–14 win over Virginia, while Boston College became co-champions of the Atlantic Division with a 28–21 win against Maryland.

==== Boston College ====
The Boston College Eagles entered the 2008 college football season having gone 11–3 during the 2007 season, ending that season with a loss to Virginia Tech in the 2007 ACC Championship Game and a 24–21 victory over Michigan State in the 2007 Champs Sports Bowl. In the annual preseason poll of media covering the ACC, Boston College was picked to finish fourth in the Atlantic Division.

The Eagles opened the season by traveling to Kent State, whom the Eagles defeated, 21–0. The Eagles' home opener was their second game of the season and was also their first conference game of the year. Against Georgia Tech, the Eagles eked out a 9–7 halftime lead, but fell behind in the second half, eventually losing, 19–16, on a Georgia Tech touchdown that came with 8:26 remaining in the game. Despite the loss, the Eagles recovered quickly, beating Central Florida, 34–7, two weeks after the Georgia Tech game. The victory was the first in an eventual four-game win streak that culminated with a 28–23 defeat of then-No. 17 Virginia Tech.

The win over Virginia Tech gave the Eagles a 2–1 conference record, and they appeared to be destined for a bid to the ACC Championship Game. But Boston College lost its next two games, both against conference opponents, dropping its record to 2–3. Despite the losses, Boston College still had a chance to win the Atlantic Division—but only if other teams lost as well. This happened on November 6, when fellow Atlantic Division team Maryland lost to Virginia Tech, and the Eagles recovered from their losing streak with an out-of-conference win against Notre Dame.

Notre Dame was the last out-of-conference opponent on Boston College's schedule, as the Eagles finished the season with three consecutive ACC games. The first of these was against Florida State which led the Atlantic Division at the time, but had had five players suspended the day before the game. The Eagles secured a victory, 27–17. The second of Boston College's final opponents was Wake Forest, which had played in the 2006 ACC Championship Game. While Boston College won, 24–21, starting quarterback Chris Crane suffered a season-ending injury, leaving backup Dominique Davis in charge of the Eagles' offense. Boston College's final game of the regular season was against Maryland and a victory against the Terrapins would push the Eagles to a tie with Florida State atop the Atlantic Division. Since Boston College had won the head-to-head game against Florida State, according to the ACC's tie-breaking rules, the Eagles would win the division. A 28–21 victory over Maryland brought Boston College to a 5–3 ACC record, giving it a co-division championship with Florida State and a trip to the ACC Championship Game.

==== Virginia Tech ====
The Virginia Tech Hokies entered the 2008 season having won the 2007 ACC Championship Game, finishing with an 11–3 overall record that included a postseason loss to the Kansas Jayhawks in the 2008 Orange Bowl. Despite winning the ACC for the second time in less than four years, Virginia Tech was anticipated to spend 2008 rebuilding a team that saw 12 starters graduate or enter the NFL draft. Though picked in a preseason poll to win the Coastal Division, the Hokies were defeated in their season opener by underdog East Carolina.

Following that loss, Virginia Tech head coach Frank Beamer announced that backup quarterback Tyrod Taylor, who had previously been expected to sit out the season on redshirt status, would play in the Hokies' second game, against Furman. Both Taylor and starting quarterback Sean Glennon performed well against the Paladins, and Tech won, 24–7. Tech's third game came against the Georgia Tech Yellow Jackets, who were employing a new offensive system, the option offense, under first-year head coach Paul Johnson. Unlike the game against Furman, Taylor started the game and remained at quarterback throughout, guiding the Hokies to their first ACC victory of the season, a 20–17 win that later gave Tech a crucial head-to-head tiebreaker against the Yellow Jackets, fellow members of the Coastal Division. The Hokies' fourth game of the season came against the North Carolina Tar Heels, who were defeated by the same margin of victory as Tech's win against Georgia Tech, 20–17.

The twin conference victories were followed by two out-of-conference wins: at Big 12 opponent Nebraska and against independent Western Kentucky. At the end of the four-game winning streak, the Hokies had a 4–1 record, 2–0 in conference, and were ranked No. 17 in the country. On October 18, however, the Hokies lost to unranked Boston College in Boston, 28–23. The game was a rematch of the previous year's ACC Championship Game and was a preview of the 2008 Championship Game matchup. The loss was the start of a four-game skid for the Hokies that saw Tech lose three of four games, only managing a victory against Maryland, 23–13. The final game of that four-game drop was a 16–13 loss to Coastal Division rival Miami, which then held a crucial tiebreaking win over the Hokies in the event of any head-to-head tie.

During the last two games of the regular season, the Hokies managed two victories: a 14–3 win against last-place ACC team Duke, and a 17–14 triumph over traditional rival Virginia. Miami, meanwhile, lost its final two games of the season: against Georgia Tech and North Carolina State. These losses dropped Miami to a 4–4 record in the ACC, one game behind the Hokies, who were tied with Georgia Tech at 5–3 following the end of the regular season. By virtue of the Hokies' head-to-head win against the Yellow Jackets, Virginia Tech earned a spot in the ACC Championship Game.

== Pre-game buildup ==
Following the last week of the regular season, both teams moved up in the national college football polls. Boston College, which had been ranked No. 21 in the BCS Poll, No. 20 in the AP Poll, and No. 22 in the Coaches' Poll, rose to No. 17 in the BCS, No. 18 in the AP Poll, and No. 20 in the Coaches' Poll. Virginia Tech, which had been unranked during the final week of the regular season, remained in the "Also Receiving Votes" category outside the top 25, except in the BCS Poll, where the Hokies rose to No. 25. Spread bettors predicted an even game. Various betting organizations favored Boston College either by a single point or none. This close spread was due in small part to the teams' familiarity with each other. The championship game marked the fourth time in 14 months that the two teams played each other, and this fact was prominently mentioned in media coverage before the game's kickoff.

=== Attendance concerns ===
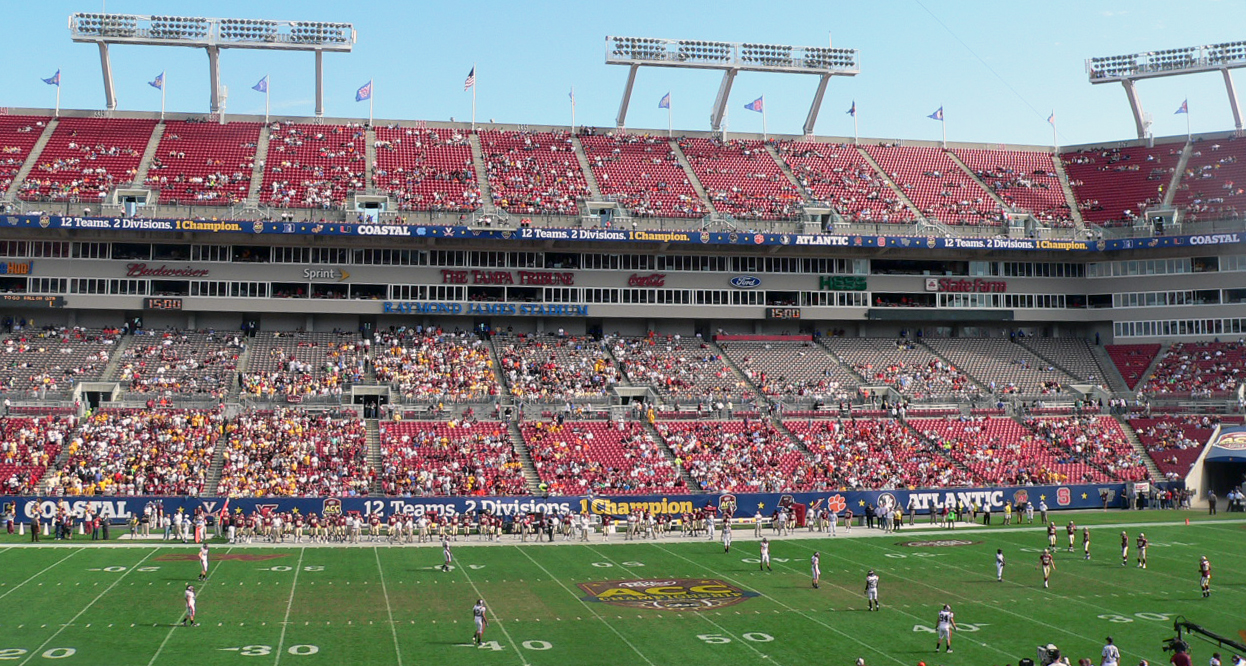
The stands at Raymond James Stadium were mostly empty on the day of the game.

Almost immediately after the selection of Virginia Tech and Boston College, concerns about potential attendance at the 2008 ACC Championship Game arose. Because the same matchup resulted in such low attendance at the 2007 championship game in Jacksonville, it was doubted that Tampa, which is several hundred miles further south and more distant from the two schools, could attract as many spectators as the previous season's game. Adding to the problem of selling tickets was the 2008 financial crisis, which many fans cited as a reason for not purchasing tickets. By the Wednesday before the game, Virginia Tech had sold just 3,000 of the 10,000 tickets it was required by contract to sell. There also were questions about how many local fans would attend. To mitigate the problems seen in Jacksonville the year before, ticket prices were lowered from $65 to $25, and it was hoped that the lower capacity of Tampa's Raymond James Stadium compared with Jacksonville Municipal Stadium would allow for a quicker sellout. The campaign to attract more fans was moderately successful, as 30,000 of the 43,000 tickets not assigned to either school were sold by December 1, five days before the game. Team ticket sales were abysmal, however, as Virginia Tech and Boston College combined to sell just 5,000 tickets of the 20,000 allotted to the two teams.

=== Boston College offense ===
The Boston College offense, which gained 319 yards per game on average, was ranked 94th (of 120 Football Bowl Subdivision teams) in total offense. A key component of the offense was guard Cliff Ramsey, who was named a first-team All-ACC selection, signifying his status as the best player at his position in the conference. Tight end Ryan Purvis was named a second-team All-ACC selection. Quarterback Dominique Davis led the Eagles' offense on the field heading into the ACC Championship. Davis had been the second-string quarterback until a season-ending injury to starter Chris Crane. During his limited time in the regular season, Davis had three passing and two rushing touchdowns.

=== Virginia Tech offense ===
Virginia Tech's offense was criticized for a lack of production during the regular season and was ranked 103rd in total offense. The Hokies gained just 301 yards of offense on average during the regular season. Despite the meager statistical performance, Tech did have some standout players. Quarterback Tyrod Taylor, who had been expected to sit out the season in reserve, finished the year as the team's starter. Running back Darren Evans was named a second-team All-ACC selection, as was guard Sergio Render. Taylor's favorite passing targets were wide receivers Danny Coale and Jarrett Boykin. Coale entered the ACC Championship Game having caught 32 catches for 352 yards, while Boykin grabbed 27 passes for 407 yards.

=== Boston College defense ===
The Eagles' defense was ranked eighth in the nation in terms of total defense, allowing an average of 277 yards per game. The Eagles led the country in interceptions, recording 25 during the course of the regular season. The Eagles also were ranked among the top 10 in run defense, pass-efficiency defense, and No. 14 in scoring defense. That strong defensive effort was led by linebacker Mark Herzlich, who was selected as the ACC's defensive player of the year for the 2008 season. Herzlich led the Eagles in tackles with 98—fifth among all Division I players—and interceptions, with 6. He was forecast to be a key player during the ACC Championship Game. Defensive tackle B. J. Raji recorded 33 tackles (11 for loss) and a team-high 7 sacks, part of a defense that allowed an average of just 87.3 rushing yards per game.

=== Virginia Tech defense ===
The Hokies' defense was ranked sixth in Division I-A during the regular season, permitting 275 yards per game on average. That defensive performance was led by cornerback Victor "Macho" Harris, who was named a first-team All-ACC selection on defense. Heading into the ACC Championship, Harris had 6 interceptions—2 returned for touchdowns—and 42 tackles. Harris also played on offense, catching 8 passes for 63 yards. Another defensive star for the Hokies was Orion Martin, a former walk-on who was third in the ACC in sacks with 7.5 and earned second-team ACC honors.

== Game summary ==
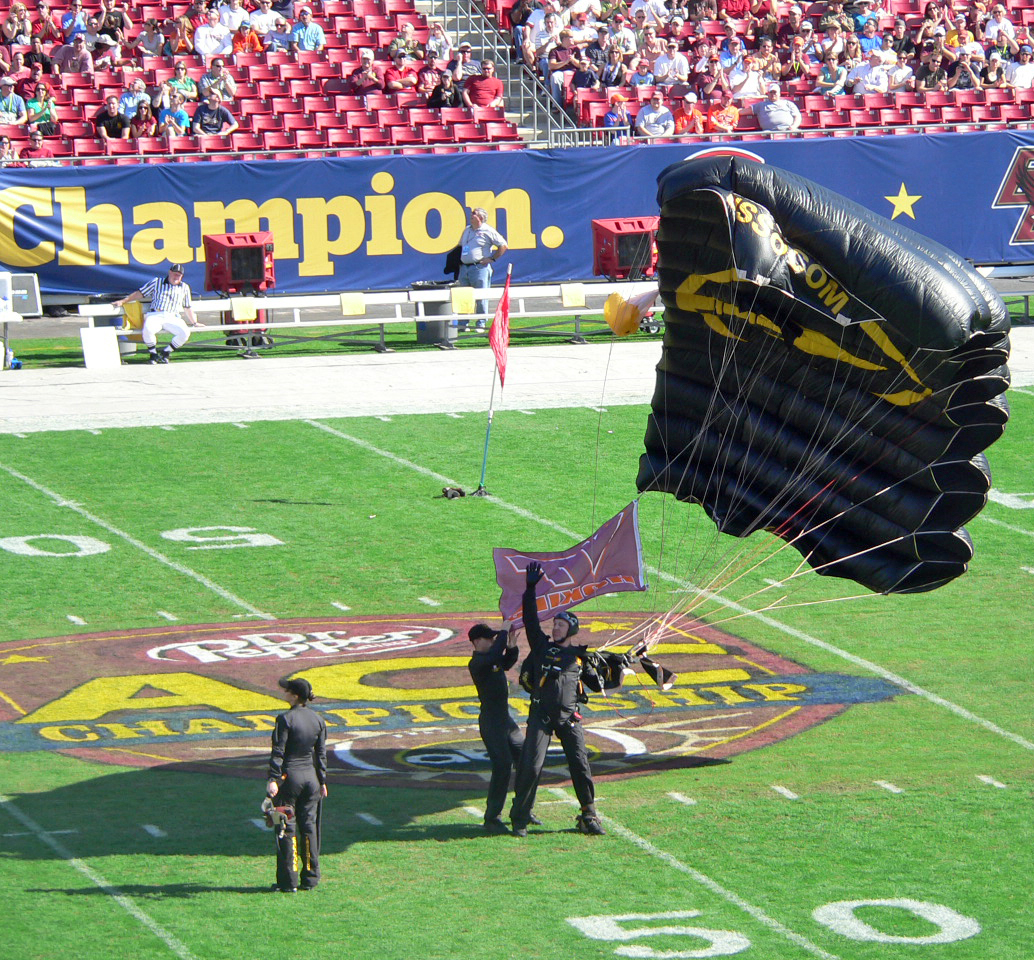
A parachutist from the Special Operations Command parachute team landing at midfield as part of the pregame ceremonies.

The 2008 ACC Championship Game kicked off on December 6, 2008, at 1 p.m. EST at Raymond James Stadium in Tampa, Florida. At kickoff, the weather was partly cloudy with 59 percent humidity and a temperature of 72 °F (22 °C). The wind was from the south-southwest at 10 miles per hour (16 km/h). The official reported attendance was 53,927, but this number came from the number of tickets sold. The actual attendance in the stadium—measured by admittance turnstiles—was 27,360, the lowest ever recorded for an ACC football championship game. Ticket demand was so low that tickets were being given away for free outside the stadium before kickoff. The game was televised in the United States by the American Broadcasting Company, and Brad Nessler, Bob Griese, Paul Maguire, and Todd Harris were the announcers. Approximately 3.3 million people watched the game, earning the broadcast a Nielsen rating of 2.9. The rating was the lowest ever recorded for an ACC Championship football game and represented a 41% decline from the previous year's rating of 4.2.

=== First quarter ===
Boston College won the ceremonial pre-game coin toss to determine first possession and elected to kick off to begin the game, ensuring that the Eagles would receive the ball to begin the second half. Virginia Tech kick returner Dyrell Roberts fielded the ball at the Tech six-yard line and returned it to the Tech 33-yard line before the first play of the game, a four-yard pass from quarterback Tyrod Taylor to wide receiver Danny Coale. Despite that initial gain, the Hokies were unable to advance the ball further and punted after going three and out. Boston College's Rich Gunnell fair caught the kick at the Eagles' 16-yard line, where the Boston College offense ran its first play of the game. Running back Montel Harris ran for a one-yard gain, but Boston College was unable to gain the needed ten yards for a first down, just as Virginia Tech had failed to do in the prior series. After going three and out, the Eagles punted back to Virginia Tech and the Hokies' offense returned to the field at the Tech 39-yard line with 11:30 remaining in the first quarter.

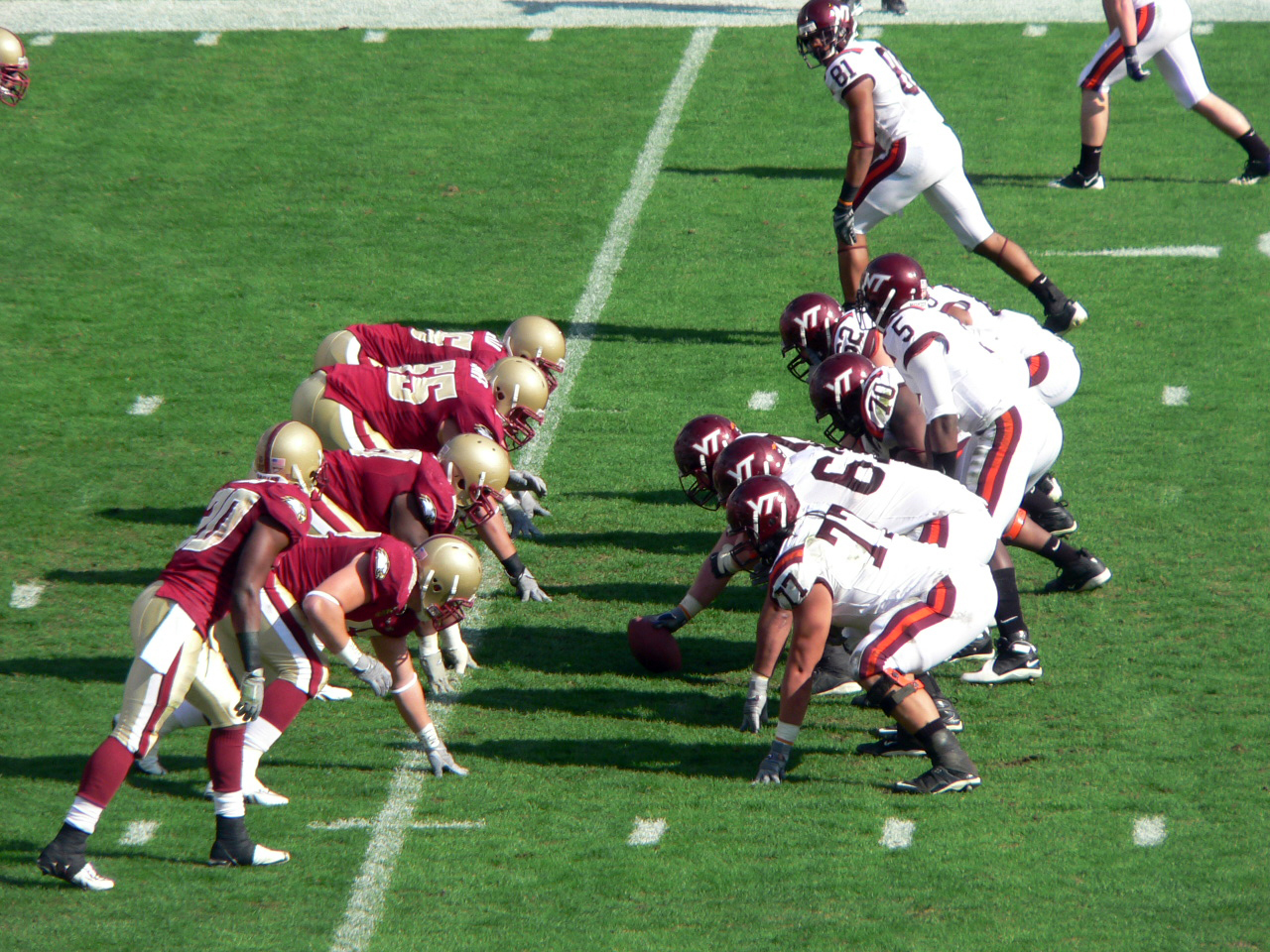
Tyrod Taylor guiding the Hokies' offense in the first half.

The first play of the drive was an incomplete pass by Taylor, but the Hokies earned the initial first down of the game two plays later when Taylor completed a 14-yard throw to Roberts, advancing the ball to the 41-yard line of Boston College in the process. After a five-yard penalty against the Hokies, Taylor completed two consecutive passes: one to Evans for a 12-yard gain and the other to Roberts for a 10-yard gain. Now at the 24-yard line of Boston College, Virginia Tech's offense began running the ball instead of passing it. Evans rushed for five yards, then second-string running back Josh Oglesby ran for seven more on the next two plays. The first of Oglesby's rushes resulted in a first down inside the Eagles' red zone, and Tech continued to advance the ball on the ground as Evans ran another five yards. Facing third down at the Boston College five-yard line, Virginia Tech called a timeout to formulate its next offensive play. That play was a five-yard rush by Taylor, who crossed the goal line for the game's first score, a Virginia Tech touchdown. The subsequent extra point kick was successful, and the Hokies took a 7–0 lead with 6:27 remaining in the first quarter.

Virginia Tech's post-touchdown kickoff was fielded at the Boston College 13-yard line by the Eagles' Harris, who returned it to the Boston College 28-yard line, and the Eagles' offense began its second drive of the game. Eagles quarterback Dominique Davis completed his first pass of the game, a 19-yard catch by Brandon Robinson, who advanced the ball to the Boston College 47-yard line for a first down. Davis then scrambled for a four-yard gain, and Harris ran for nine yards on the next two plays, gaining the Eagles' second first down of the game. Once inside the Virginia Tech 40-yard line, however, the Hokies' defense stiffened. Davis was able to gain six yards on two running plays, but after an incomplete pass, the Eagles were forced to punt for the second time in the first quarter. The kick sailed into the end zone for a touchback, and Virginia Tech's offense began work at its 20-yard line. The Hokies' third drive of the quarter mirrored its first, however, as Virginia Tech went three and out and punted after failing to gain a first down. The Eagles recovered the ball with 1:32 remaining in the quarter and committed a five-yard false start penalty to begin their possession. On the first play after the penalty, Davis was sacked for a loss of two yards. Harris regained the lost yardage and more with a six-yard run, but after Davis threw an incomplete pass on third down, the Eagles were forced to punt again. Before they could kick the ball, however, the quarter came to an end. With three quarters remaining in the game, Virginia Tech held a 7–0 lead.

=== Second quarter ===
The second quarter began with Boston College in possession of the ball at its 28-yard line and preparing to punt. Virginia Tech's Harris fielded the kick at the Tech 35-yard line and returned it to the Tech 49-yard line, where the Hokies' offense took to the field for their first play of the second quarter. Evans gained six yards on a rush, then Coale was stopped for no gain on an end-around. Facing third down and needing four yards, Taylor passed for a first down to Boykin, who advanced the ball to the Boston College 39-yard line. On the next play, Evans broke free for a 30-yard gain, giving the Hokies a first down at the Eagles' nine-yard line. Three plays later, Taylor ran four yards for the Hokies' second touchdown of the game. The extra point was good, and Tech expanded its lead to 14–0 with 11:08 remaining in the first half.

Virginia Tech's post-touchdown kickoff was returned to the Boston College 20-yard line, and the Eagles began their first full possession of the second quarter. Davis lost a yard on a running play, then was sacked for an eight-yard loss. Facing third down and needing 19 yards for a first down, Harris gained five yards and the Eagles punted after going three and out. The kick was returned to the Eagles' 36-yard line, and Tech began a possession deep in Boston College territory. The first Tech play lost two yards, but the Hokies regained the lost yardage on the next play, picking up four yards with a pass from Taylor to Evans. Taylor scrambled on third down, gaining eight yards and a first down. The Hokies attempted a short run, then Taylor gained another first down with a pass to the BC 14-yard line. Once there, however, Tech committed a 10-yard holding penalty, pushing the Hokies backwards. After the penalty, Taylor was tackled for a loss of seven more yards. Facing a second down and 27 yards, Taylor attempted to pass for the first down, but the ball was batted into the air and intercepted by a Boston College defender.

Following the turnover, the Eagles' offense began work at their 46-yard line. Davis completed a five-yard pass to Robinson, advancing into Tech territory. An incomplete pass followed, but Davis was able to gain the first down with a pass to Rich Gunnell at the 39-yard line. On the first pass after the first down, Davis and Gunnell connected on a deep pass, but Gunnell fumbled and the ball was recovered in the end zone by a Virginia Tech defender. The play resulted in a touchback, and Virginia Tech took over on offense at its 20-yard line. Following the turnover, Tech went three and out, punting back to Boston College with 2:11 remaining before halftime.

The kick was fair caught at the 34-yard line of Boston College. On the first play after the kick, Davis connected with Harris on a pass play that resulted in a 51-yard gain for the Eagles. At the Tech 15-yard line following the big gain, the Eagles lost one yard on a rushing play before Davis passed to Gunnell for a 16-yard gain and a touchdown. The extra point was good, and with 1:29 remaining in the first half, Virginia Tech's lead was cut to 14–7.

The Eagles' post-touchdown kickoff was returned to the Tech 33-yard line, and on the first play after the kick, Boston College committed a personal foul penalty when Tyrod Taylor was hit out of bounds. Following the penalty, the ball was advanced to the Tech 42-yard line and the Hokies were given a first down. Tech completed two short passes, advancing to the 50-yard line, but the Hokies punted after not gaining another first down. The kick sailed out of bounds, and the Eagles returned to offense with 19 seconds remaining in the first half. Rather than try to score quickly, Boston College elected to run out the clock with Virginia Tech leading, 14–7.

=== Third quarter ===
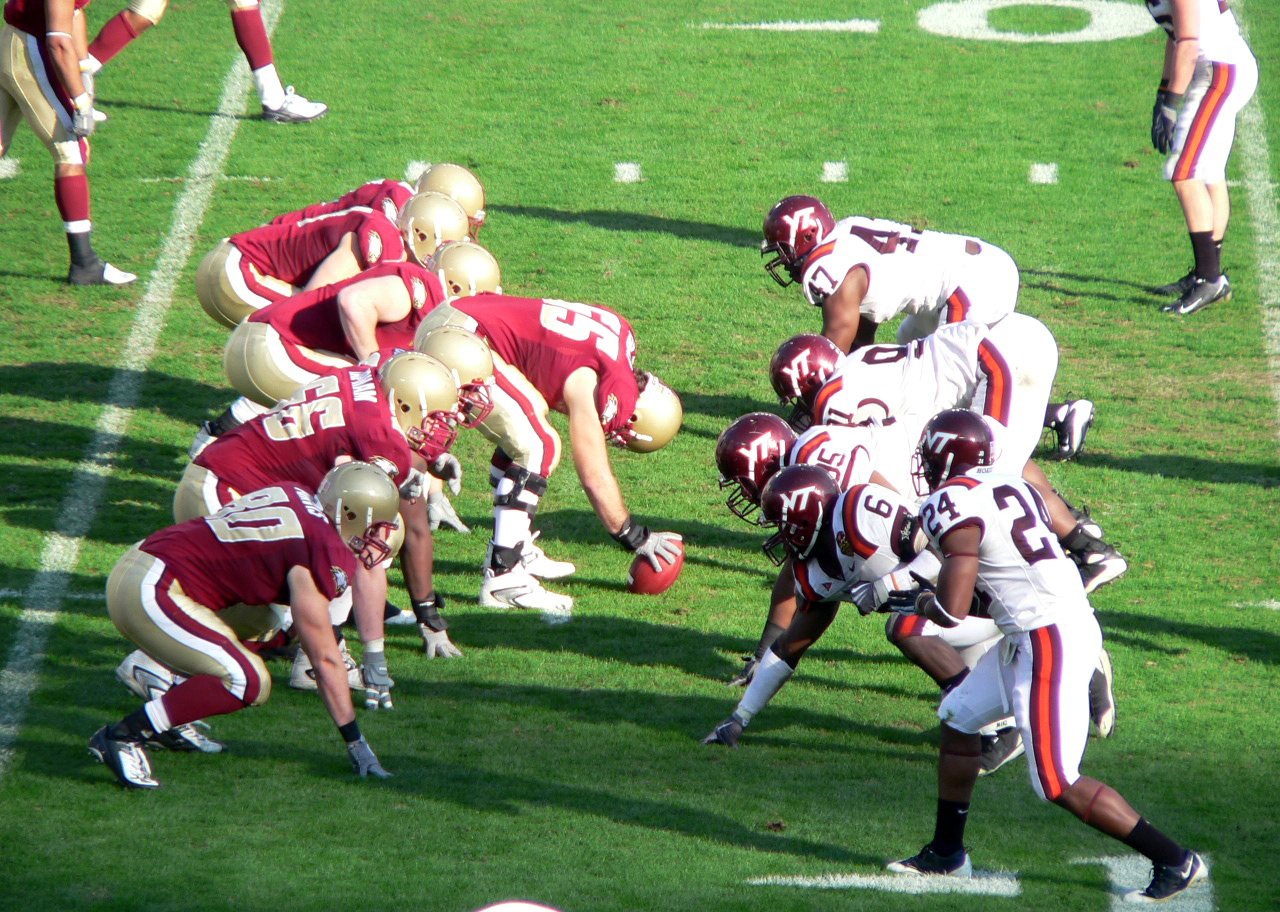
Boston College preparing to run an offensive play in the second half.

Because Virginia Tech received the ball to begin the game, Boston College received the ball to begin the second half. Virginia Tech's kickoff was returned to the Eagles' 35-yard line, and Boston College's offense began the first possession of the second half. An incomplete pass by Davis was followed by a short rush and another incomplete pass, and the Eagles were forced to punt after going three and out. The kick went out of bounds at Virginia Tech's 32-yard line, and the Hokies' offense had their first possession of the second half. Tech likewise went three and out, then returned the ball to the Eagles with a punt. The kick went out of bounds, and following the exchange, Boston College's offense started from its 31-yard line.

The first Eagles' play after the Tech punt was a 22-yard pass from Davis to Gunnell for a first down at the Tech 47-yard line. Following the long gain, the Eagles were unable to gain another first down, and punted back to the Hokies. The kick was fair caught at the Tech 16-yard line with 11:08 remaining in the third quarter, and the Virginia Tech offense returned to the field. Tech advanced the ball on three consecutive plays: a six-yard pass to Evans, a short rush by Evans, then a first down pass to Roberts. Following the first down, Evans ran for another first down, advancing the Hokies to their 44-yard line. Two Tech plays were stopped for little or no gain, but on third and nine, Taylor scrambled for an 18-yard gain and a first down at the Boston College 37-yard line. Evans gained six yards on first down, but the Hokies were unable to gain the next four yards. Instead of punting, Tech head coach Frank Beamer sent kicker Jared Keys into the game to attempt a field goal. Keys' 50-yard kick sailed through the uprights, and Tech extended its lead to 17–7 with 6:07 remaining in the quarter.

Tech's post-score kickoff was returned to the Eagles' 30-yard line. Davis started the drive with an incomplete pass, then Harris gained seven yards with a rush up the middle. A third-down pass fell incomplete, and Boston College punted. The kick was fair caught at the Tech 30-yard line, and with 5:01 left in the quarter, the Hokies returned to offense. On the first play, Taylor ran 11 yards for a first down. Taylor threw an incomplete pass, and the Hokies were penalized 10 yards for holding, pushing them back to the 31-yard line. Tech was unable to regain the lost yardage, and punted. The kick was 57 yards, and Boston College was further backed up by a penalty during the return. Following the kick, Boston College's offense was forced back to its seven-yard line to start. An incomplete pass was followed by a scramble by Davis. During the run, Davis fumbled the ball, which was recovered by a Boston College player. Facing third down, Davis scrambled again, this time for a first down to the 21-yard line. On the first play after the first down scramble, a deep pass downfield by Davis was intercepted by Virginia Tech's Stephan Virgil. The interception was returned to the Boston College 10-yard line, and on the first play by Tech's offense, Evans ran the ten yards for a touchdown. The extra point was good, and with 1:17 remaining, the Hokies extended their lead to 24–7.

Tech's post-touchdown kickoff was downed in the end zone for a touchback, and the Eagles began on offense at their 20-yard line. Three consecutive incomplete passes later, Boston College punted, ending their sixth three and out of the game. Following the kick, Tech started at its 27-yard line. On first down, the Hokies ran an end-around for five yards, then the quarter came to an end. With one quarter remaining, Virginia Tech led, 24–7.

=== Fourth quarter ===
Virginia Tech began the fourth quarter in possession of the ball and facing a second down and five from their 33-yard line. The first play of the quarter was a seven-yard run by Evans, who earned a first down at the Tech 40-yard line. On the next play after the first down run, Evans fumbled the ball and Boston College recovered. The Eagles' offense started within field goal range at the Tech 30-yard line. Boston College's first play was stopped for no gain, but the second was a 22-yard pass by Davis to Gunnell, giving the Eagles a first down inside the Tech 10-yard line. Davis threw three incomplete passes before Boston College coach Jeff Jagodzinski sent kicker Steve Aponavicius into the game to attempt a 24-yard field goal. The kick was good, and the Eagles cut Tech's lead to 24–10.

The post-touchdown kickoff was returned to the Tech 20-yard line, and the Hokies began an offensive drive hoping to run down the clock and preserve their two-touchdown lead. Because the game clock continues to run on rushing plays, the Hokies executed five consecutive rushing plays, picking up a first down in the process. The Hokies were unable to gain a second first down, however, and Tech punted from its 40-yard line. The kick rolled out of bounds at the Eagles' 28-yard line with 9:28 remaining in the game, and Boston College took over on offense. On the first play after the punt, however, Tech defender Jason Worilds tackled Davis, forcing a fumble, which bounced into the hands of fellow defender Orion Martin, who ran it 17 yards for a defensive touchdown. The extra point bounced off an upright, however, and was no good. Still, with just 9:05 remaining in the game, Tech took a commanding 30–10 lead.

The Hokies' kickoff after the defensive score was caught at the goal line and returned to the 28-yard line by Boston College's Chris Fox. Following the return, Davis completed a seven-yard pass to the 35-yard line, then picked up a first down to the 42-yard line with another pass. Davis then scrambled three yards and threw for another first down, this time to tight end Lars Anderson. Now at the Tech 46-yard line, Davis threw three incomplete passes before throwing another on fourth down. With 6:39 remaining in the game, Boston College turned the ball over on downs to the Virginia Tech offense. The Hokies again began to run out the clock. Evans ran the ball three consecutive times, but on the third rush, Evans fumbled for the second time in the game. The fumble was recovered by Boston College linebacker Mark Herzlich and Boston College's offense returned to the field.

From the Tech 32-yard line, Davis threw an incomplete pass then connected on a 21-yard pass to Jarvis for a first down. After an incomplete pass, Davis threw another pass to Jarvis, who caught it at the four-yard line. Facing third down, Davis attempted another pass. The ball was tipped into the air and caught by Virginia Tech defender Brent Warren. The Hokies resumed running down the clock with short rushes by Evans, who advanced the ball to the 13-yard line with 3:05 remaining in the game. Boston College used its allotted second-half timeouts to stop the clock and preserve time for a late scoring drive. In a strategic move, Tech coach Frank Beamer ordered an intentional safety rather than attempt a punt from the Tech end zone. Any such kick has the potential to be blocked for a defensive touchdown. Thus, an intentional safety gives the defense two points while denying them the slight chance to score seven. The score cut Virginia Tech's lead to 30–12 with 3:05 remaining, but the limited time remaining meant Tech's lead would be sufficient to win the game without a series of unlikely events.

The free kick following the intentional safety was returned to near midfield, and Davis passed for a first down. Following the second down, Davis was sacked for a loss, but then scrambled for a first down to the Tech 25-yard line. From there, however, Boston College's offense began to struggle. During the four plays that followed, the Eagles were able to gain just one yard and turned the ball over on downs again. The final Boston College play was a sack of Davis, and Virginia Tech proceeded to run out the clock by kneeling on the ball after taking the field on offense.

== Statistical summary ==
Statistical comparison
	BC	VT
1st downs	13	15
Total yards	308	234
Passing yards	263	84
Rushing yards	45	150
Penalties	4–38	3–26
3rd down conversions	3–15	7–17
4th down conversions	0–2	0–1
Turnovers	4	3
Time of Possession	24:06	35:34

In recognition of his winning performance during the ACC Championship, Virginia Tech quarterback Tyrod Taylor was named the game's most valuable player. Taylor finished the game having completed 11 of his 19 pass attempts for 84 yards and one interception. He also ran the ball 11 times for 30 yards and two touchdowns. On the opposite side of the ball, Boston College quarterback Dominique Davis was the game's leading passer, having completed 17 of his 43 pass attempts for 263 yards, one touchdown, and two interceptions. Davis also carried the ball 14 times for 12 yards on the ground. Davis' 51-yard pass to Harris in the second quarter set an ACC Championship Game record for the longest play recorded to that point.

Boston College wide receiver Rich Gunnell was the game's leading receiver, having been the primary beneficiary of Davis' prolific passing. Gunnell finished the game having caught seven passes for 114 yards and one touchdown. Virginia Tech wide receiver Dyrell Roberts was the game's second-leading receiver. He caught four passes for 44 yards. Tech's second-most proficient receiver was running back Darren Evans, who caught three passes for 22 yards. Evans was the game's leading rusher, having carried the ball 31 times for 114 yards and a touchdown. On the opposite side, Boston College running back Montel Harris led the Eagles on the ground with nine carries for 34 yards.

Defensively, Boston College linebacker Mark Herzlich led all players with nine tackles. Of the nine stops, one and a half were for negative yardage. The leading Virginia Tech defender was Cody Grimm, who had eight tackles, two and a half of which were for losses. One and a half of the tackles for loss were quarterback sacks, and Grimm also forced a fumble and broke up one Boston College pass. In total, the Hokies' defense intercepted two passes and recovered two fumbles. The Eagles' defense likewise caused three turnovers, recovering two fumbles and intercepting one pass. Boston College sacked Taylor twice, while Virginia Tech's defense reached Davis five times.

== Postgame effects ==
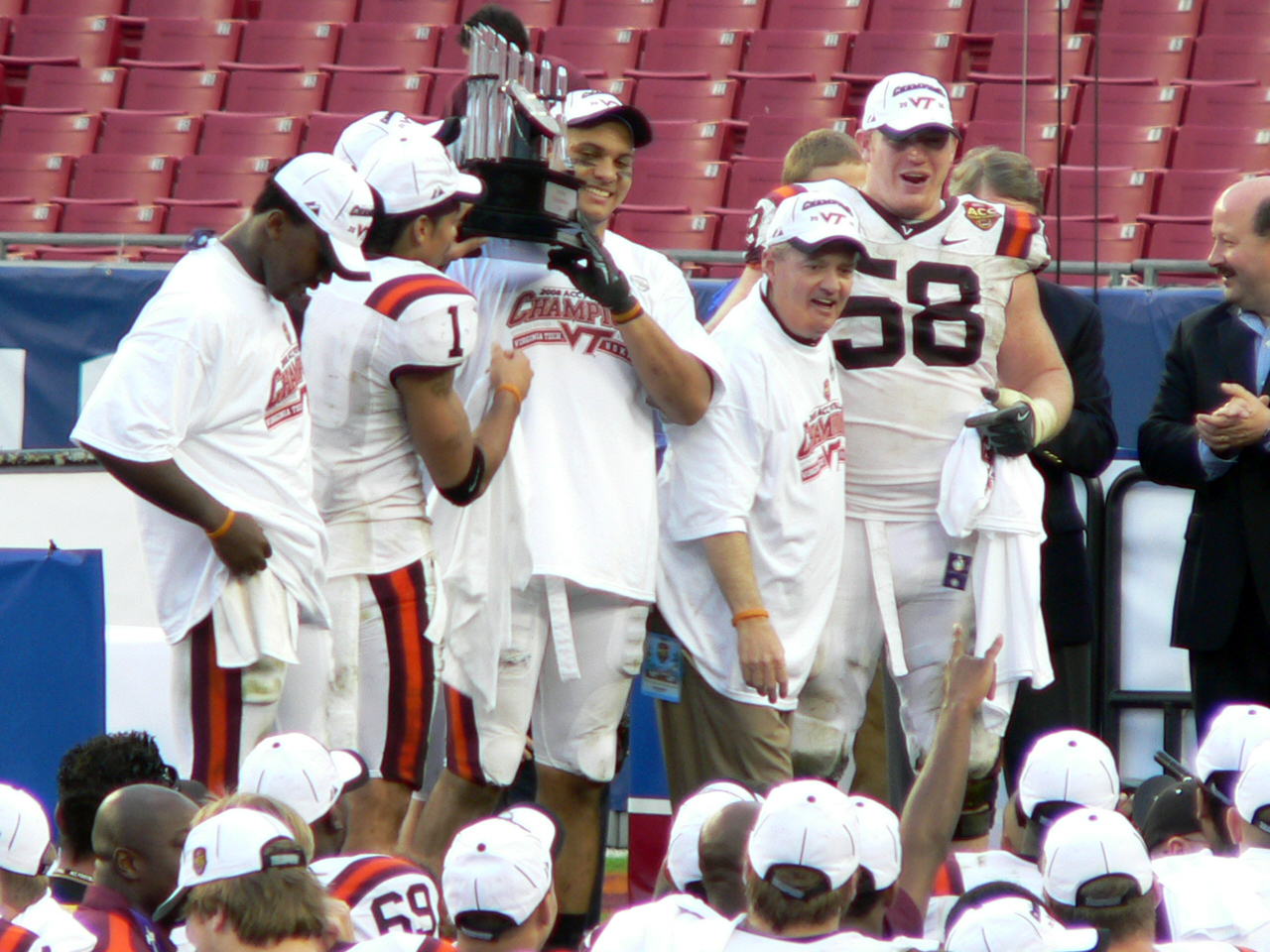
Virginia Tech football players and coaches hoisting the championship trophy after the game.

Virginia Tech's win in the ACC Championship Game brought it to a 9–4 record, while Boston College's loss brought it also to a 9–4 record. Both teams' standings in the national polls were affected by the game. In the BCS poll, the Eagles fell from 17th to 24th, while Virginia Tech rose from 25th to 19th. In the AP Poll, Tech rose to 21st, while Boston College fell out of the poll entirely, appearing in the "also receiving votes" category at 27th. With the win, Virginia Tech was awarded the ACC's automatic Bowl Championship Series bid to the 2009 Orange Bowl. Boston College, meanwhile, was selected to play in the 2008 Music City Bowl. The pick by the Music City Bowl represented a drop in prestige for Boston College. Had the Eagles won the championship game, they would have earned an automatic bid to the Orange Bowl and a payout of $17.5 million. Instead, the Music City Bowl, which offered a payout of $1.7 million, was contractually obliged to select the Eagles after Boston College was not selected by any of the three more prestigious bowl games with ACC ties.

The Music City Bowl took place on December 31, and in a contest against Southeastern Conference opponent Vanderbilt, Boston College lost, 16–13. The loss ended a streak of eight consecutive bowl game wins for Boston College. In the Orange Bowl, Virginia Tech emerged victorious against Big East Conference champion Cincinnati, 20–7. The win was Tech's first BCS bowl game win since 1995, and was the first ACC BCS game win since 2000.

=== Boston College coaching changes ===
Following the loss to Vanderbilt in the 2008 Music City Bowl, Boston College head coach Jeff Jagodzinski announced his intention to interview for the vacant head coaching position with the National Football League's New York Jets. In an unusual move, Boston College athletic director Gene DeFillippo announced that if Jagodzinski went ahead with an interview, he would be fired as head coach of the Boston College football team. DeFillippo previously stated that a five-year contract with Jagodzinski, signed in 2007, was contingent on the coach staying "for the long term". Jagodzinski proceeded with the interview and was fired by DeFillippo on January 7.

To replace Jagodzinski, DeFillippo promoted Boston College defensive coordinator Frank Spaziani, who previously served as the Boston College head coach on an interim basis in 2006. Boston College offensive coordinator Steve Logan, who was unhappy with the staff changes on the football team, resigned shortly after Spaziani's promotion. To replace Logan, Spaziani hired former Navy head coach Gary Tranquill as Boston College's new offensive coordinator. One week after Logan's announcement, the Eagles' offensive line coach, Jack Bicknell, Jr., also announced that he was leaving the team. On January 27, special teams and tight ends coach Don Yanowsky announced his resignation from the Eagles, making him the fourth coach to be fired or resign from the Boston College football team after the season.

== See also ==
- List of Atlantic Coast Conference football champions
- Boston College–Virginia Tech football rivalry

Other Conference Championship Games

- 2008 SEC Championship Game
- 2008 Big 12 Championship Game
- 2008 MAC Championship Game
- 2008 Conference USA Football Championship Game
