= Cody Grimm =

American football player and coach (born 1987)

Las Vegas Raiders
- Title: Defensive quality control coach

Personal information
- Born: February 26, 1987 (age 39); Fairfax, Virginia, U.S.
- Listed height: 5 ft 11 in (1.80 m)
- Listed weight: 200 lb (91 kg)

Career information
- High school: Oakton (Vienna, Virginia)
- College: Virginia Tech
- NFL draft: 2010: 7th round, 210th overall pick

Career history

Playing
- Tampa Bay Buccaneers (2010–2012)

Coaching
- Virginia Tech (2014–2018) Defensive quality control coach; Tampa Bay Buccaneers (2019–2021) Defense & special teams assistant; Jacksonville Jaguars (2022–2023) Safeties coach; Las Vegas Raiders (2026–present) Defensive quality control

Awards and highlights
- As player: Third-team All-American (2009); First-team All-ACC (2009); Dudley Award (2009); Chick-fil-A Bowl Defensive MVP (2009); As coach: Super Bowl champion (LV)

Career NFL statistics
- Total tackles: 73
- Forced fumbles: 1
- Interceptions: 2
- Defensive touchdowns: 1
- Stats at Pro Football Reference

Cody James Grimm (born February 26, 1987) is an American football coach and former safety. He previously served as an assistant coach for the Tampa Bay Buccaneers and Jacksonville Jaguars.

Grimm played college football at Virginia Tech and was selected by the Tampa Bay Buccaneers in the seventh round of the 2010 NFL draft. He played for three seasons in the NFL with the Buccaneers.

== Early life ==
Grimm was born in Fairfax, Virginia, on February 26, 1987, the son of Pro Football Hall of Fame guard and former Arizona Cardinals assistant head coach/offensive line coach Russ Grimm. His older brother, Chad, played college football at Virginia Tech, was the outside linebackers coach for the Washington Redskins from 2017 to 2019. Grimm's younger brother, Dylan, played lacrosse at Loyola University Maryland, where he won a National Championship in 2012. His uncle, Donn Grimm, was a starting linebacker on the Notre Dame 1988 National Championship team and signed with the Cardinals as a rookie free agent in 1991.

Grimm attended and played high school football at Oakton High School in Vienna, Virginia, where he lettered three times. As an outside linebacker, he finished his senior season with 127 total tackles, seven interceptions and three quarterback sacks. He also caught 17 passes for 278 yards and six touchdowns as a tight end. On October 29, 2004, Oakton beat Westfield High School 24-20, and Grimm recorded a high school career-high 19 tackles along with a sack and an interception as Oakton ended the Bulldogs’ 21-game winning streak. That season, he helped Oakton win their first district championship in 25 years. After the season, Grimm earned first-team all-state and Northern Region Defensive Player of the Year honors. Grimm also played lacrosse for Oakton. He lettered three times and led team to three state championships and was an all-American midfielder and face-off specialist recruited by Georgetown, Loyola and Virginia. In 2019, Grimm was inducted into the Oakton High School Athletics Hall of Fame. In 2022, he was honored by being added into the Northern Virginia Football Hall of Fame.

== Playing career ==
=== College ===
After graduating from Oakton, Grimm had one football scholarship offer, which was from Division I-AA William & Mary College. He also received recruiting offers to come in as a walk-on from Virginia, Pittsburgh, and Virginia Tech. He chose to attend Virginia Tech.

Grimm played in 54 games and started 15 over four seasons at Virginia Tech, recording 214 tackles, 26.5 tackles for loss, 11.5 sacks, nine forced fumbles, two fumble recoveries and two interceptions.

==== Redshirt (2005) ====
Grimm redshirted in 2005 and worked on the scout team as a whip linebacker.

==== Freshman season (2006) ====
As a freshman, Grimm was a starter on three different special team units. In his first game for Virginia Tech, he was in on 13 special team plays against Northeastern University. He ended the season with 10 total tackles.

==== Sophomore season (2007) ====
Grimm started on defense for the first time in his college career against Boston College and played 21 snaps at whip linebacker with three tackles. He finished the 2007 ACC Championship Game at linebacker when Cam Martin was injured with knee problems. In the 2008 Orange Bowl loss to Kansas, he had six tackles. Grimm finished the season with 27 total tackles. Head coach Frank Beamer awarded Grimm a scholarship in his redshirt sophomore season.

==== Junior season (2008) ====
During his junior season, Grimm started on three special team units. In a win over Georgia Tech on September 13, 2008, he caught his first interception and had three tackles. The following week at North Carolina, he contributed a quarterback sack and a tackle for loss among his five tackles. On October 25, 2008, Grimm recorded two sacks in a loss against Florida State. In the 2008 ACC Championship Game win against Boston College, he led the team with eight tackles, including 2.5 for loss. In the 2009 Orange Bowl win, Grimm had five total tackles, a sack and an interception against Cincinnati. He finished the season third on the team with 71 tackles and ranked second in tackles for loss (14) and sacks (7.5). He also tied for fifth on the team in quarterback hurries with seven and forced two fumbles.

==== Senior season (2009) ====
In his senior year, Grimm became a starter at outside linebacker for the Hokies. On October 3, 2009, he tallied a game and career-high 14 tackles in a 34–26 win against Duke, including two tackles for loss (six yards) and a forced fumble. Grimm helped the Hokies defense hold Duke to 38 rushing yards on 31 attempts (1.2 yards per rush) and was named ACC Player of the Week. On November 9, 2009, Grimm had a game-high 12 total tackles, a forced and recovered fumble, and a late-game sack in Virginia Tech's 16-3 win against East Carolina. He again won ACC Player of the Week honors. Grimm won the award for the third time after he set an ACC single-season record and tied an NCAA single-game record with three forced fumbles—all of which came in North Carolina State’s first four plays—in the Hokies’ win over the Wolfpack on November 21, 2009. Grimm helped the Virginia Tech defense limit NC State’s offensive to 259 yards of total offense by recording eight tackles, two sacks, a quarterback hurry, and a fumble recovery. He was named the Defensive MVP of the 2009 Chick-fil-A Bowl, where the Hokies won against the University of Tennessee.

Grimm had 106 total tackles, four sacks and 12.5 tackles for a loss during his senior season. He was awarded the 2009 Dudley Award, which is named for former Virginia standout "Bullet" Bill Dudley and is given to the state's top Division I college football player. Grimm also earned first-team all-Atlantic Coast Conference honors and third-team All-America honors from the Associated Press. He is the second former Tech walk-on to earn All-America honors, joining John Engelberger, a 1999 AP second-team selection.

=== Professional ===
Grimm was drafted in the seventh round (210th overall) of the 2010 NFL draft by the Tampa Bay Buccaneers as a safety.

Pre-draft measurables
Height	Weight	Arm length	Hand span	40-yard dash	10-yard split	20-yard split	20-yard shuttle	Three-cone drill	Vertical jump	Broad jump	Bench press
5 ft 10 7/8 in (1.80 m)	203 lb (92 kg)	30 1/2 in (0.77 m)	9 5/8 in (0.24 m)	4.48 s	1.59 s	2.55 s	4.02 s	6.58 s	35.5 in (0.90 m)	9 ft 9 in (2.97 m)	11 reps
All values from NFL Combine/Pro Day

On July 29, 2010, Grimm signed a four-year contract with the Buccaneers worth $1.85 million.

Grimm earned a spot on the Buccaneers' 53-man roster on September 4, 2010. On September 23, he replaced Tanard Jackson as the team's starting free safety after Jackson was suspended a year for violating the NFL's substance abuse policy. Grimm was the third rookie from Tampa Bay's 2010 draft class to be named a starter for the season. On October 10, during a 24–21 win over the Cincinnati Bengals, at Paul Brown Stadium, Grimm got his first career interception, which he returned 11 yards for his first career touchdown. His season was cut short after suffering a fractured left fibula in a game against the Baltimore Ravens.

After coming back from injury, Grimm started the 2011 NFL season as the Buccaneers' starting free safety. He finished with 11 tackles, 10 solo and one assisted, and a pass deflection in three games before colliding with teammate Geno Hayes in a game against the Atlanta Falcons on September 25, 2011. On September 28, the Bucs officially placed Grimm on injured reserve for the second straight year, ending his season with another setback.

== Coaching career ==
=== Virginia Tech ===
In 2014, Grimm began his coaching career at his alma mater, Virginia Tech, as a defensive quality control coach.

=== Tampa Bay Buccaneers ===
In 2019, Grimm was hired by the Tampa Bay Buccaneers as a defensive and special teams assistant under head coach Bruce Arians. Grimm earned his first Super Bowl title when the Buccaneers won Super Bowl LV.

=== Jacksonville Jaguars ===
On February 17, 2022, Grimm was hired by the Jacksonville Jaguars as their safeties coach under head coach Doug Pederson. He was fired following the 2023 season.

=== Las Vegas Raiders ===
On March 1, 2026, the Las Vegas Raiders hired Grimm to serve as a defensive quality control coach under new head coach Klint Kubiak.
