= Donn Grimm =

American football player

Profile
- Position: Inside Linebacker

Personal information
- Born: Scottdale, Pennsylvania, U.S.
- Listed height: 6 ft 2 in (1.88 m)
- Listed weight: 224 lb (102 kg)

Career information
- College: Notre Dame

Career history
- Phoenix Cardinals (1991)*
- * Offseason or practice squad member only

Awards and highlights
- National champion (1988); 4× letter-winner (1987–1990)

Donn Grimm is an American former football player. He was a linebacker on the Notre Dame team that won the 1988 Consensus National Championship. He was a four-time letterman with the Irish. He was awarded each year from 1987 until his senior year in 1990. In 1989, he came in second on the team for tackles. After graduation, he signed with the Phoenix Cardinals as a rookie free agent in 1991.

Donn is the brother of Pro Football Hall of Famer Russ Grimm, who mentioned him in his enshrinement speech at the Hall in August 2010. He is the uncle of Cody Grimm, a safety with the Tampa Bay Buccaneers.
