= Corey Phelps =

American business educator

- Education: San Diego State University; New York University
- Occupations: John and Karen Arnold Dean of the Smeal College of Business
- Employer: The Pennsylvania State University

Corey Phelps is an American business educator and author. He currently serves as the John and Karen Arnold Dean of the Smeal College of Business at The Pennsylvania State University and a professor of strategic management.

== Education ==
Phelps earned an undergraduate degree and MBA from San Diego State University. He received a Ph.D. from the Stern School of Business at New York University.

== Career ==
Prior to his current position, Phelps served as the Dean of the Price College of Business at the University of Oklahoma. Prior to that, he served as Associate Dean of Executive Programs and Education, Professor of Strategy and Organization, and the Marcel Desautels Faculty Fellow at the Desautels Faculty of Management at McGill University.

He has also served as a member of the Strategy and Business Policy faculty at HEC Paris and was an assistant professor of Management and Organization along with serving as the Dempsey Faculty Fellow at the Foster School of Business at the University of Washington.

Phelps is the co-author, with Bernard Garrette and Olivier Sibony, of Cracked It! How to Solve Big Problems and Sell Solutions Like Top Strategy Consultants and has written articles for various publications and scholarly journals. Phelps has received multiple research awards and grants and is a past member of the editorial boards of four leading academic journals.

Phelps is the past Chair of the Academy of Management Technology and Innovation Management Division along with the Knowledge and Innovation Interest Group of the Strategic Management Society. In 2011, he co-founded the European Strategy, Entrepreneurship and Innovation (SEI) Doctoral Consortium.

He is the past director of the HEC Paris-Atos GOLD Talent Development Program, an EFMD Excellence in Practice Award recipient.

For his teaching, he was awarded the Pierre Vernimmen BNP Paribas Award at HEC Paris and two professor of the year awards at the University of Washington.

== Publications ==
Phelps's research has been published in academic journals including the Academy of Management Journal, Information Systems Research, Management Science, Organization Science, and Strategic Management Journal. According to Google Scholar, Phelps's research has received over 8,500 citations as of 2022.

Phelps received the Academy of Management Technology and Innovation Management Division's Best Dissertation Award, The State Farm Companies Foundation Dissertation Award, and the 2012 INFORMS Technology Management Best Paper Award.

According to research conducted by the Meta-Research Innovation Center at Stanford University, Phelps is among the world's top 2% most-cited economics and business researchers.
