= Chris Crane =

American football player (born 1986)

No. 10
- Position: Quarterback

Personal information
- Born: April 18, 1986 (age 40); Mechanicsburg, Pennsylvania, U.S.
- Listed height: 6 ft 4 in (1.93 m)
- Listed weight: 236 lb (107 kg)

Career information
- High school: Trinity (Camp Hill, Pennsylvania)
- College: Boston College
- NFL draft: 2009: undrafted

Career history
- Indianapolis Colts (2009)*; Milwaukee Iron (2010)
- * Offseason or practice squad member only

Career AFL statistics
- Comp. / Att.: 16 / 32
- Passing yards: 132
- TD–INT: 3–0
- QB rating: 84.4
- Rushing yards: 13
- Stats at ArenaFan.com

Christopher T. Crane (born April 18, 1986) is an American former professional football quarterback who played for the Milwaukee Iron of the Arena Football League (AFL). He was signed by the Indianapolis Colts as an undrafted free agent in 2009. He played college football for the Boston College Eagles.

== Early life ==
Crane was a four-year starter for the Trinity Shamrocks. He holds the Trinity career records for completions (313), passing yards (4,320) and touchdown passes (45). During his senior season, Crane completed 101 of 170 passes for 1,291 yards, 17 passing touchdowns, and also had seven rushing touchdowns. Crane had a 31–11 overall record at quarterback and played in the 2003 Pennsylvania East-West All-Star Game.

Crane was a member of the Trinity basketball team that won the PIAA Class AA state championship in 2003, his junior season, and he totaled 1,483 career points.

== College career ==
Crane was redshirted during the 2004 season at Boston College. In 2005, was the third-string quarterback behind Matt Ryan and Quinton Porter. He saw action in one game, completing three of four pass attempts for 42 yards and one rush for eight yards against Ball State.

Crane played eight games in 2006. He made his first career start on October 28, 2006, against the Buffalo Bulls, completing 17-of-26 pass attempts for 142 yards and one touchdown; added two rushing touchdowns in the 41–0 blowout win over the Bulls. He also completed three of three pass attempts for nine yards against the Maine Black Bears and also completed two of three passes for 41 yards against the Duke Blue Devils.

Crane saw his first action of the 2007 season on September 22 against Army. He finished one of two passing for 15 yards in the game. His only other action of the season came on October 10 against Bowling Green, where he completed one of two passes for 13 yards.

Crane began 2008 as the Eagles starting quarterback, ahead of redshirt freshman Dominique Davis. He led the Eagles to a 3–1 start, with his first loss coming against Georgia Tech, 19–16. He then briefly improved the team's conference record by winning against NC State and Virginia Tech, but lost the next two against North Carolina and Clemson. These losses were fueled by Crane's mediocre performance, but calls for his benching quickly ended when he led the team to a win against rival Notre Dame and to a win at Florida State during FSU's Senior Night. Crane's short time as the Boston College starter came to an end as he broke his collarbone against Wake Forest. The Eagles, under Dominique Davis, advanced and lost in the 2008 ACC Championship Game against Virginia Tech for a second year in a row.

=== Statistics ===
		Passing										Rushing		
Season	Team	GP	GS	Record	Comp	Att	Pct	Yds	TD	INT	Rating	Att	Yds	TD
2005	Boston College	1	0	–	3	4	75.0	42	0	0	163.2	1	8	0
2006	Boston College	8	1	1–0	22	32	68.8	193	1	1	123.5	13	9	2
2007	Boston College	2	0	–	2	4	50.0	28	0	0	108.8	1	-4	0
2008	Boston College	11	11	8–3	169	307	55.1	1,721	10	13	104.4	82	219	7
Totals		22	12	9–3	196	347	56.5	1,984	11	14	106.9	97	232	9

== Professional career ==
=== Indianapolis Colts ===
After going undrafted in the 2009 NFL draft, Crane was signed by the Indianapolis Colts as an undrafted free agent on May 3, 2009. He was released on July 28, but re-signed on August 10 after an injury to quarterback Jim Sorgi. Crane was waived again on August 22.

=== Milwaukee Iron ===
Crane spent the 2010 season as a member of the Milwaukee Iron. He completed 16 of 32 passes for 132 yards. He threw three touchdowns and no interceptions.
