= Pierre Vernimmen =

French economist

- Born: 12 April 1946; Paris, France
- Died: 28 December 1996 (aged 50); Paris, France
- Education: HEC Paris; Harvard Business School
- Occupation: Economist

Pierre Vernimmen (12 April 1946 – 28 December 1996) was a French economist, professor at the HEC Paris and director of the consulting department of the Paribas investment bank. He was the author of Finance d'Entreprise, a reference manual in corporate finance and accounting.

== Biography ==
Pierre Vernnimen graduated from HEC Paris in 1968 and from the Harvard Business School.

He began teaching at HEC Paris in 1968 and, at the age of 23, became the first coordinator of the founding team of the HEC finance department. He contributed to the development of corporate finance courses, created case studies, recruited and trained faculty, developed courses in corporate finance and banking management, and collaborated on courses related to capital markets.

After persuading the Paribas Human Resources department to have its executives trained at HEC, he joined Paribas in 1973, where he spent the remainder of his career. Initially, he worked in the industrial department (shareholdings) before moving to the "consulting" department, which focused on mergers and acquisitions. He created and managed this department from 1993 until his death at the end of 1996. Pierre Vernimmen was the architect of numerous business mergers (Louis Vuitton and Moët Hennessy for example), financing rounds (M6, Virgin Megastores...) and film financing (Savage Nights, Cyrano de Bergerac...).

At the same time, Vernimmen published his book Finance d'entreprise in French. The book went through twelve editions over twenty-four years. Pascal Quiry and Yann Le Fur, themselves professors of finance at HEC and investment bankers, are today continuing the work begun by Pierre Vernimmen. Vernimmen's book is a management manual that covers corporate finance. It begins with the analysis of accounting data and market techniques, progressing to an examination of financial decisions.

Finance d'entreprise is an educational tool written by Vernimmen. Each chapter of the book is followed by a summary, questions and exercises updated with their corrections as well as a bibliography. The book has been translated into English under the title "Corporate Finance - theory & practice" by John Wiley & Sons. It is co-signed with Pascal Quiry, Yann Le Fur, Maurizio Dallocchio & Antonio Salvi. A website is linked to the book. In addition to the monthly letters, the site offers graphics, statistics, exercise answers and a glossary.

== Books ==
- Finance d'entreprise - Pascal Quiry, Yann Le Fur (Dalloz, 2015)
- Corporate Finance : theory & practice - Pierre Vernimmen, Pascal Quiry, Yann Le Fur, Maurizio Dallocchio, Antonio Salvi (John Wiley & Sons, 2014 4th. edition)
- Finance d'entreprise : Analyse et gestion - Pierre Vernimmen (Dalloz, 1988)
- Gestion et politiques de la banque - Pierre Vernimmen (Dalloz, 1981)
- Finance d'entreprise, logique et politique - Pierre Vernimmen (Dalloz, 1976)
- Gestion bancaire : nouvelles méthodes et pratiques - Michel Schlosser, Pierre Vernimmen (Dalloz, 1974).
- Validité de la méthode des ratios - Edward Altman, Michel Margaine, Michel Schlosser, Pierre Vernimmen (CESA, 1974).
- Secteur bancaire - André Boisard, Pierre Vernimmen, Henri Proglio, René Proglio (Editions Dafsa, 1972)
