= Ryan Purvis =

American football player (born 1986)

No. 46, 80
- Position: Tight end

Personal information
- Born: May 8, 1986 (age 40); Allentown, Pennsylvania, U.S.
- Listed height: 6 ft 4 in (1.93 m)
- Listed weight: 260 lb (118 kg)

Career information
- College: Boston College
- NFL draft: 2009: undrafted

Career history
- Tampa Bay Buccaneers (2009–2010); New York Giants (2012)*
- * Offseason or practice squad member only

Awards and highlights
- First-team All-ACC (2007); Second-team All-ACC (2008)

Career NFL statistics
- Receptions: 5
- Receiving yards: 38
- Stats at Pro Football Reference

Ryan J. Purvis (born May 8, 1986) is an American former professional football player who was a tight end in the National Football League (NFL). He was signed by the Tampa Bay Buccaneers as an undrafted free agent in 2009. He played college football for the Boston College Eagles.

== Early life ==
Purvis played high school football at Lancaster Catholic High School in Lancaster, Pennsylvania. In 2003, he won All-State honors as a tight end and All-Conference honors as a tight end (first-team), defensive end (first-team), and punter (second-team). As a senior, he made 39 receptions for 755 yards and four touchdowns, averaged 38.8 yards on 41 punts, and threw two touchdown passes. He was selected to play in the fourth annual PSFCA East-West Football Classic.

Purvis was also a standout on the Crusaders' basketball team. He recorded more than 1000 points and 700 rebounds in his career at center and power forward. Ryan was the starting center on the winningest boys basketball in Pennsylvania prep history. His junior year, the Crusaders went 35-0 and won the 2003 PIAA Class AAA Championship by toppling Perry Traditional Academy 75-59 at the Giant Center in Hershey. In that game, broadcast statewide by PCN, Ryan demonstrated outstanding athletic ability that transformed a little-known junior tight end into one of the most hotly recruited football players in the state. The Crusaders also swept the Lancaster Lebanon League Section 3 title, the L-L League Championship and the District 3 AAA title.

Purvis was recruited by a host of Division 1 football programs, including the University of Pittsburgh and UCLA.

== College career ==
After redshirting the 2004 season, Purvis made his college debut in the 2005 season opener at BYU, where he caught one pass. He finished the season with six receptions for 12 yards.

Purvis played in all 13 of BC's games as a sophomore in 2006, starting in two of them (Clemson and Duke). He made 29 catches for 381 yards and two touchdowns. He made two catches for 40 yards, including a 25-yard touchdown reception, against Navy in the Meineke Car Care Bowl.

Purvis started all 14 games in 2007, finishing the season with 54 catches for 553 yards and four touchdowns. He had two catches for 14 yards in the ACC Championship Game against Virginia Tech and two catches for 18 yards in BC's win against Michigan State in the Champs Sports Bowl. He was named to the Lombardi Award and John Mackey Award watch lists and was named to the All-ACC first-team.

Purvis started all 14 games of the 2008 Boston College season. Purvis had 24 catches for 176 yards, including 4 catches for 29 yards in the 2008 Music City Bowl. Purvis also got some snaps at fullback in place of the injured James McCluskey.

== Professional career ==
=== Tampa Bay Buccaneers ===
Purvis was not selected in the 2009 NFL draft. On May 1, 2009, Purvis signed a free-agent contract with the Tampa Bay Buccaneers. He was waived during final cuts on September 5 and re-signed to the practice squad the following day.

Purvis was promoted to the active roster on December 28 after running back Earnest Graham and defensive end Jimmy Wilkerson were placed on injured reserve. Purvis was again promoted to the active roster on October 25, 2010 when Jerramy Stevens was released. He was cut on September 3, 2011.
