= Mike McLaughlin (American football) =

American football player (born 1987)

Profile
- Position: Fullback

Personal information
- Born: May 11, 1987 (age 39); Woburn, Massachusetts
- Listed height: 6 ft 0 in (1.83 m)
- Listed weight: 242 lb (110 kg)

Career information
- High school: Woburn (MA)
- College: Boston College
- NFL draft: 2010: undrafted

Career history
- Baltimore Ravens (2010–2011)*; Denver Broncos (2012)*
- * Offseason or practice squad member only

Mike McLaughlin (born May 11, 1987) is an American former football fullback. He was signed as an undrafted free agent by the Baltimore Ravens after the 2010 NFL draft. McLaughlin attended Woburn Memorial High School in Woburn, Massachusetts, where his senior season he rushed for 1,005 yards and scored 22 touchdowns as the fullback. He also had 75 tackles with 4 sacks at linebacker. McLaughlin played college football for the Boston College Eagles. He originally played linebacker at Boston College. He was a member of both the Ravens and the Denver Broncos during his professional career.
