= 2008–09 NCAA football bowl games =

College football postseason game series

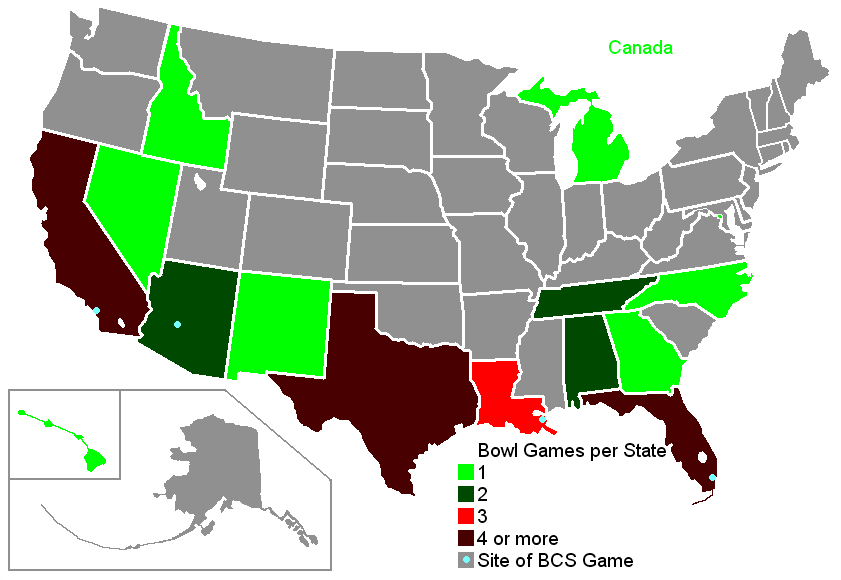
- Bowl sites by state
- Season: 2008
- Regular season: August 28–December 6
- Number of bowls: 34
- All-star games: 3
- Bowl games: December 20, 2008 – January 31, 2009
- National Championship: 2009 BCS Championship
- Location of Championship: Dolphin Stadium, Miami Gardens, Florida
- Champions: Florida Gators
- Bowl Challenge Cup winner: Pac-10
Bowl record by conference
Conference	Bowls	Record	Final AP poll
ACC	10	4–6 (0.400)	2
SEC	8	6–2 (0.750)	4
Big 12	7	4–3 (0.571)	5
Big Ten	7	1–6 (0.143)	4
Big East	6	4–2 (0.667)	2
Conference USA	6	4–2 (0.667)	0
Pac-10	5	5–0 (1.000)	3
Mountain West	5	3–2 (0.600)	3
WAC	5	1–4 (0.200)	1
MAC	5	0–5 (0.000)	1
Independents	2	1–1 (0.500)	0
Sun Belt	2	1–1 (0.500)	0

The 2008–09 NCAA football bowl games, which concluded the 2008 NCAA Division I FBS football season, contained a record number of bowl games scheduled in college football history. A total of 37 bowl games, 34 team-competitive games and three all-star games, were played starting on December 20, 2008, with four contests and concluding with the Texas vs. The Nation Game in El Paso, Texas, played on January 31, 2009, at Sun Bowl Stadium. For the first time in 62 years, however, the Hula Bowl was not a part of the post-season as it was cancelled indefinitely.

A new record of 34 team-competitive bowls, plus three all-star games, were played, including the inaugural St. Petersburg Bowl and EagleBank Bowl. While bowl games had been the purview of only the very best teams for nearly a century, this was the third consecutive year that teams with non-winning seasons participated in bowl games. To fill the 68 available team-competitive bowl slots, a new record total of 9 teams (13% of all participants) with non-winning seasons participated in bowl games—all 9 had a .500 (6-6) season.

== Selection of the teams ==
NCAA bylaws say that a school with a record of 6–6 in regular season play and at least 5 wins over FBS teams are eligible only after conferences cannot fill out available positions for bowl games with teams having seven (or more) wins automatically eligible, excluding games played in Hawaii and conference championship games in the ACC, Big 12, Conference USA, MAC and the SEC.

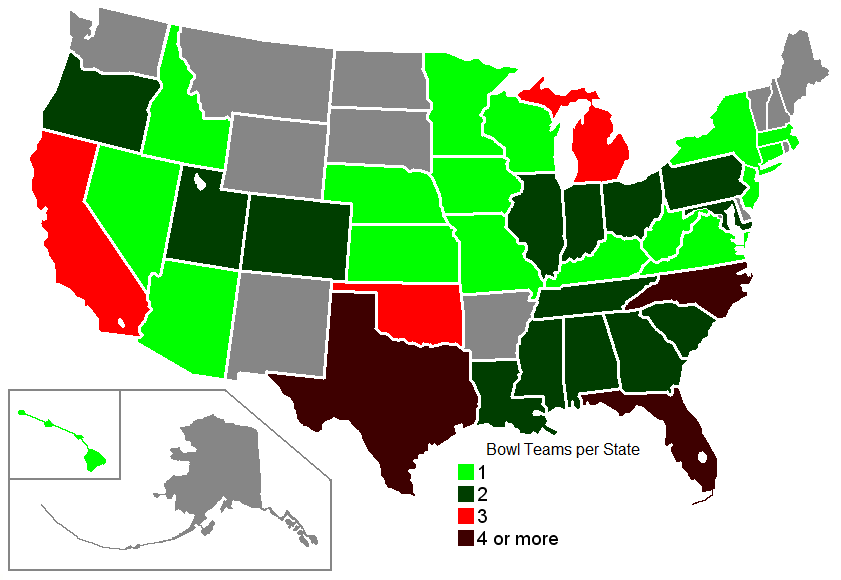
Number of bowl teams per state.

After the final regular-season games on December 7, 2008, four conferences — the Pac-10, the SEC, the Big 12, and the Big Ten — did not have enough teams to fill their bowl game allotments. The Pac-10 had seven contracted bowl slots with only five teams eligible. The last two bowls in the Pac-10 pecking order—the Hawaiʻi Bowl (sixth) and Poinsettia Bowl (seventh)—had contingency contracts with other conferences, respectively Conference USA and the WAC, to select one of the secondary conference's teams should the Pac-10 fail to supply enough eligible teams to supply that bowl. However, because C-USA had only six bowl-eligible teams to fill its six primary bowl slots, the Pac-10/C-USA slot in the Hawaiʻi Bowl became an at-large spot, and was awarded to independent Notre Dame. The SEC and Big 12 failed to produce enough teams to fill their requirements even before both conferences had two teams selected to BCS games, while the Big Ten was unable to fill its requirements once a second team from that conference (Ohio State) was selected to a BCS game. The Atlantic Coast Conference sent an NCAA-record ten teams to bowl games this season. Since 72 teams were bowl-eligible, but only 68 bowl slots were available, four teams were left out of bowl games. Unlike in 2007, when an eight-win Troy team was left home for the postseason, no team with seven or more wins went without a bowl bid this year. All four uninvited teams — Arkansas State, Bowling Green, Louisiana-Lafayette, and San José State — had six wins.

== Results ==
NOTE: Rankings from final regular-season AP Poll of December 7, 2008.

=== Non-BCS bowl games ===
Date	Game	Site	Teams	Affiliations	Results
Dec. 20	EagleBank Bowl	RFK Stadium; Washington, D.C.	Wake Forest (7–5); Navy (8–4)	ACC; Independents	Wake Forest 29; Navy 19
Dec. 20	New Mexico Bowl	University Stadium; Albuquerque, New Mexico	Colorado State (6–6); Fresno State (7–5)	Mountain West; WAC	Colorado State 40; Fresno State 35
Dec. 20	St. Petersburg Bowl	Tropicana Field; St. Petersburg, Florida	South Florida (7–5); Memphis (6–6)	Big East; C-USA	South Florida 41; Memphis 14
Dec. 20	Las Vegas Bowl	Sam Boyd Stadium; Whitney, Nevada	Arizona (7–5) #17 BYU (10–2)	Pac-10; Mountain West	Arizona 31; BYU 21
Dec. 21	New Orleans Bowl	Louisiana Superdome; New Orleans	Southern Miss (6–6); Troy (8–4)	C-USA; Sun Belt	Southern Miss 30; Troy 27 (OT)
Dec. 23	Poinsettia Bowl	Qualcomm Stadium; San Diego	#11 TCU (10–2) #9 Boise State (12–0)	Mountain West; WAC	TCU 17; Boise State 16
Dec. 24	Hawaiʻi Bowl	Aloha Stadium; Honolulu, HI	Notre Dame (6–6); Hawaiʻi (7–6)	Independents; WAC	Notre Dame 49; Hawaiʻi 21
Dec. 26	Motor City Bowl	Ford Field; Detroit	Florida Atlantic (6–6); Central Michigan (8-4)	Sun Belt; MAC	Florida Atlantic 24; Central Michigan 21
Dec. 27	Meineke Car Care Bowl	Bank of America Stadium; Charlotte, North Carolina	West Virginia (8–4); North Carolina (8–4)	Big East; ACC	West Virginia 31; North Carolina 30
Dec. 27	Champs Sports Bowl	Citrus Bowl; Orlando, Florida	Florida State (9–3); Wisconsin (7–5)	ACC; Big Ten	Florida State 42; Wisconsin 13
Dec. 27	Emerald Bowl	AT&T Park; San Francisco	California (8–4); Miami (FL) (7–5)	Pac-10; ACC	California 24; Miami (FL) 17
Dec. 28	Independence Bowl	Independence Stadium; Shreveport, Louisiana	Louisiana Tech (7–5); Northern Illinois (6–6)	WAC; MAC	Louisiana Tech 17; Northern Illinois 10
Dec. 29	Papajohns.com Bowl	Legion Field; Birmingham, Alabama	Rutgers (7–5); North Carolina State (6–6)	Big East; ACC	Rutgers 29; NC State 23
Dec. 29	Alamo Bowl	Alamodome; San Antonio	#25 Missouri (9–4) #22 Northwestern (9–3)	Big 12; Big Ten	Missouri 30; Northwestern 23 (OT)
Dec. 30	Humanitarian Bowl	Bronco Stadium; Boise, Idaho	Maryland (7–5); Nevada (7–5)	ACC; WAC	Maryland 42; Nevada 35
Dec. 30	Holiday Bowl	Qualcomm Stadium; San Diego	#15 Oregon (9–3) #13 Oklahoma State (9–3)	Pac-10; Big 12	Oregon 42; Oklahoma State 31
Dec. 30	Texas Bowl	Reliant Stadium; Houston	Rice (9–3); Western Michigan (9–3)	C-USA; MAC	Rice 38; Western Michigan 14
Dec. 31	Armed Forces Bowl	Amon G. Carter Stadium; Fort Worth, Texas	Houston (7–5); Air Force (8–4)	C-USA; Mountain West	Houston 34; Air Force 28
Dec. 31	Sun Bowl	Sun Bowl Stadium; El Paso, Texas	#24 Oregon State (8–4) #18 Pittsburgh (9–3)	Pac-10; Big East	Oregon State 3 Pittsburgh 0
Dec. 31	Music City Bowl	LP Field; Nashville, Tennessee	Vanderbilt (6–6); Boston College (9–4)	SEC; ACC	Vanderbilt 16; Boston College 14
Dec. 31	Insight Bowl	Sun Devil Stadium; Tempe, Arizona	Kansas (7–5); Minnesota (7–5)	Big 12; Big Ten	Kansas 42; Minnesota 21
Dec. 31	Chick-fil-A Bowl	Georgia Dome; Atlanta	LSU (7–5) #14 Georgia Tech (9–3)	SEC; ACC	LSU 38; Georgia Tech 3
Jan. 1	Outback Bowl	Raymond James Stadium; Tampa, Florida	Iowa (8–4); South Carolina (7–5)	Big Ten; SEC	Iowa 31; South Carolina 10
Jan. 1	Gator Bowl	Jacksonville Municipal Stadium; Jacksonville, Florida	Nebraska (8–4); Clemson (7–5)	Big 12; ACC	Nebraska 26; Clemson 21
Jan. 1	Capital One Bowl	Citrus Bowl; Orlando, Florida	#16 Georgia (9–3) #19 Michigan State (9–3)	SEC; Big Ten	Georgia 24; Michigan State 12
Jan. 2	Cotton Bowl Classic	Cotton Bowl, Fair Park; Dallas, Texas	#20 Ole Miss (8–4) #8 Texas Tech (11–1)	SEC; Big 12	Ole Miss 47; Texas Tech 34
Jan. 2	Liberty Bowl	Liberty Bowl Memorial Stadium; Memphis, Tennessee	Kentucky (6–6); East Carolina (9–4)	SEC; C-USA	Kentucky 25; East Carolina 19
Jan. 3	International Bowl	Rogers Centre; Toronto	UConn (7–5); Buffalo (8–5)	Big East; MAC	UConn 38; Buffalo 20
Jan. 6	GMAC Bowl	Ladd–Peebles Stadium; Mobile, Alabama	Tulsa (10–3) #23 Ball State (12–1)	C-USA; MAC	Tulsa 45; Ball State 13

=== BCS bowl games ===
Date	Game	Site	Teams	Affiliations	Results
Jan. 1	Rose Bowl	Rose Bowl Stadium; Pasadena, California	#5 USC (11–1) #6 Penn State (11–1)	Pac-10; Big Ten	USC 38; Penn State 24
Jan. 1	Orange Bowl	Dolphin Stadium; Miami Gardens, Florida	#21 Virginia Tech (9–4) #12 Cincinnati (11–2)	ACC; Big East	Virginia Tech 20; Cincinnati 7
Jan. 2	Sugar Bowl	Louisiana Superdome; New Orleans	#7 Utah (12-0) #4 Alabama (12-1)	Mountain West; SEC	Utah 31; Alabama 17
Jan. 5	Fiesta Bowl	University of Phoenix Stadium; Glendale, Arizona	#3 Texas (11-1) #10 Ohio State (10-2)	Big 12; Big Ten	Texas 24; Ohio State 21
Jan. 8	BCS National Championship Game	Dolphin Stadium; Miami Gardens, Florida	#1 Florida (12-1) #2 Oklahoma (12-1)	SEC; Big 12	Florida 24; Oklahoma 14

== Conference bowl representation ==
Bowl Appearances						Final Rankings				
Conference	No. of teams	Record	Pct.	Winners	Losers	Ranked Teams	Team	AP (1/9/09)	Coaches (1/9/09)	BCS (12/7/08)
Pac-10	5	5–0	1.000	USC; Oregon; Oregon State; California; Arizona		4	USC	#3(1)	#2	#5
Pac-10	5	5–0	1.000	USC; Oregon; Oregon State; California; Arizona		4	Oregon	#10	#9	#17
Pac-10	5	5–0	1.000	USC; Oregon; Oregon State; California; Arizona		4	Oregon State	#18	#19	NR
Pac-10	5	5–0	1.000	USC; Oregon; Oregon State; California; Arizona		4	California	NR	#25	NR
Pac-10	Winners of 2008–09 Bowl Challenge Cup with perfect record.									
SEC	8	6–2	0.750	Florida; Georgia; Ole Miss; Vanderbilt; LSU; Kentucky	Alabama; South Carolina	4	Florida	#1(48)	#1(60)	#2
SEC	8	6–2	0.750	Florida; Georgia; Ole Miss; Vanderbilt; LSU; Kentucky	Alabama; South Carolina	4	Alabama	#6	#6	#4
SEC	8	6–2	0.750	Florida; Georgia; Ole Miss; Vanderbilt; LSU; Kentucky	Alabama; South Carolina	4	Georgia	#13	#10	#15
SEC	8	6–2	0.750	Florida; Georgia; Ole Miss; Vanderbilt; LSU; Kentucky	Alabama; South Carolina	4	Ole Miss	#14	#15	#25
SEC	Florida won the National Championship. Vanderbilt won in a bowl for the first time since 1955. Kentucky won a bowl for the third straight season, a first in school history.									
Big East	6	4–2	0.667	West Virginia; South Florida; Rutgers; Connecticut	Cincinnati; Pittsburgh	3	Cincinnati	#17	#17	#12
Big East	6	4–2	0.667	West Virginia; South Florida; Rutgers; Connecticut	Cincinnati; Pittsburgh	3	West Virginia	#23	NR	NR
Big East	6	4–2	0.667	West Virginia; South Florida; Rutgers; Connecticut	Cincinnati; Pittsburgh	3	Pittsburgh	NR	NR	#20
Big East	Both of the Big East's BCS-ranked teams lost their games.									
Big 12	7	4–3	0.571	Texas; Missouri; Kansas; Nebraska	Oklahoma; Texas Tech; Oklahoma State	5	Texas	#4	#3	#3
Big 12	7	4–3	0.571	Texas; Missouri; Kansas; Nebraska	Oklahoma; Texas Tech; Oklahoma State	5	Oklahoma	#5	#6	#1
Big 12	7	4–3	0.571	Texas; Missouri; Kansas; Nebraska	Oklahoma; Texas Tech; Oklahoma State	5	Texas Tech	#12	#12	#7
Big 12	7	4–3	0.571	Texas; Missouri; Kansas; Nebraska	Oklahoma; Texas Tech; Oklahoma State	5	Oklahoma State	#16	#18	#13
Big 12	7	4–3	0.571	Texas; Missouri; Kansas; Nebraska	Oklahoma; Texas Tech; Oklahoma State	5	Missouri	#19	#16	#21
Conference USA	6	4–2	0.667	Southern Mississippi; Rice; Houston; Tulsa	Memphis; East Carolina	0	none			
Conference USA	Rice ended a 54-year winless streak in bowls, Houston ended theirs at 28.									
Mountain West	5	3–2	0.600	Utah; TCU; Colorado State	Brigham Young; Air Force	3	Utah	#2(16)	#4(1)	#6
Mountain West	5	3–2	0.600	Utah; TCU; Colorado State	Brigham Young; Air Force	3	TCU	#7	#7	#11
Mountain West	5	3–2	0.600	Utah; TCU; Colorado State	Brigham Young; Air Force	3	Brigham Young	#25	#21	#16
Mountain West	Utes became first BCS outsider to win two BCS games; their other was the 2005 Fiesta Bowl. The Utes also won their eighth straight bowl game.									
Independents	2	1–1	0.500	Notre Dame	Navy	0	none			
Independents	Notre Dame won first bowl game since 1994 Cotton Bowl Classic.									
Sun Belt	2	1–1	0.500	Florida Atlantic	Troy	0	none			
Sun Belt	Only conference ineligible for 2008–09 Bowl Challenge Cup.									
ACC	10	4–6	0.400	Virginia Tech; Florida State; Maryland; Wake Forest	Georgia Tech; Boston College; North Carolina; Miami (FL); NC State; Clemson	4	Virginia Tech	#15	#14	#19
ACC	10	4–6	0.400	Virginia Tech; Florida State; Maryland; Wake Forest	Georgia Tech; Boston College; North Carolina; Miami (FL); NC State; Clemson	4	Georgia Tech	#22	#22	#14
ACC	10	4–6	0.400	Virginia Tech; Florida State; Maryland; Wake Forest	Georgia Tech; Boston College; North Carolina; Miami (FL); NC State; Clemson	4	Florida State	#21	#23	NR
ACC	10	4–6	0.400	Virginia Tech; Florida State; Maryland; Wake Forest	Georgia Tech; Boston College; North Carolina; Miami (FL); NC State; Clemson	4	Boston College	NR	NR	#24
ACC	The ACC's ten teams in postseason is a new NCAA record. Boston College's streak of bowl wins in eight consecutive seasons ended.									
Western Athletic	5	1–4	0.200	Louisiana Tech	Boise State; Fresno State; Hawaiʻi; Nevada	1	Boise State	#11	#13	#9
Big Ten	7	1–6	0.143	Iowa	Penn State; Ohio State; Michigan State; Northwestern; Minnesota; Wisconsin	5	Penn State	#8	#8	#8
Big Ten	7	1–6	0.143	Iowa	Penn State; Ohio State; Michigan State; Northwestern; Minnesota; Wisconsin	5	Ohio State	#9	#11	#10
Big Ten	7	1–6	0.143	Iowa	Penn State; Ohio State; Michigan State; Northwestern; Minnesota; Wisconsin	5	Iowa	#20	#20	NR
Big Ten	7	1–6	0.143	Iowa	Penn State; Ohio State; Michigan State; Northwestern; Minnesota; Wisconsin	5	Michigan State	#24	#24	#18
Big Ten	7	1–6	0.143	Iowa	Penn State; Ohio State; Michigan State; Northwestern; Minnesota; Wisconsin	5	Northwestern	NR	#NR	#23
Big Ten	Iowa's win in Outback Bowl avoided a total shutout.									
Mid-American	5	0–5	0.000		Ball State; Central Michigan; NIU; Western Michigan; Buffalo	1	Ball State	NR	NR	#22
Mid-American	Only winless conference in bowl season.									

NOTE: BCS bowl participants are listed in italics.

== Post-BCS All-Star Games ==
All-Star Game	Date	Location	Television	Result	Ref.
East–West Shrine Game	January 17, 2009	Robertson Stadium; University of Houston; Houston, Texas	ESPN2	East 24, West 19	
Senior Bowl	January 24, 2009	Ladd–Peebles Stadium; Mobile, Alabama	NFL Network	South 35, North 18	
Texas vs The Nation	January 31, 2009	Sun Bowl Stadium; University of Texas at El Paso; El Paso, Texas	CBS College Sports Network	The Nation 27, Texas 24	
