= 2008 NCAA football bowl games =

In college football, 2008 NCAA football bowl games may refer to:

- 2007-08 NCAA football bowl games, for games played in January 2008 as part of the 2007 season.
- 2008-09 NCAA football bowl games, for games played in December 2008 as part of the 2008 season.
