= 2008 NCAA Division I FBS football rankings =

- Season: 2008
- Bowl season: 2008–09 bowl games
- Preseason No. 1: Georgia
- End of season champions: Florida
- Conference with most teams in final AP poll: Big 12 (5)

Three human polls and one formulaic ranking make up the 2008 NCAA Division I FBS (Football Bowl Subdivision) football rankings, in addition to various publications' preseason polls. Unlike most sports, college football's governing body, the NCAA, does not bestow a national championship title. That title is bestowed by one or more of four different polling agencies. There are two main weekly polls that begin in the preseason: the AP Poll and the Coaches Poll. About halfway through the season, two additional polls are released, the Harris Interactive Poll and the Bowl Championship Series (BCS) standings. The Harris Poll and Coaches Poll are factors in the BCS standings. At the end of the season, the BCS standings determine who plays in the BCS bowl games as well as the BCS National Championship Game.

== Legend ==
	Increase in ranking
	Decrease in ranking
	Not ranked previous week
	Selected for BCS National Championship Game
(#–#)	Win–loss record
(Italics)	Number of first place votes
т	Tied with team above or below also with this symbol

== AP Poll ==
	Preseason Aug 16	Week 1 Sept 2	Week 2 Sept 7	Week 3 Sept 14	Week 4 Sept 21	Week 5 Sept 28	Week 6 Oct 5	Week 7 Oct 12	Week 8 Oct 19	Week 9 Oct 26	Week 10 Nov 2	Week 11 Nov 9	Week 12 Nov 16	Week 13 Nov 23	Week 14 Nov 30	Week 15 Dec 7	Week 16 (Final) Jan 9	
1.	Georgia (22)	USC (1–0) (21)	USC (1–0) (33)	USC (2–0) (61)	USC (2–0) (62)	Oklahoma (4–0) (43)	Oklahoma (5–0) (51)	Texas (6–0) (39)	Texas (7–0) (65)	Texas (8–0) (65)	Alabama (9–0) (46)	Alabama (10–0) (44)	Alabama (11–0) (42)	Alabama (11–0) (63)	Alabama (12–0) (62)	Florida (12–1) (50)	Florida (13–1) (48)	1.
2.	Ohio State (21)	Georgia (1–0) (20)	Georgia (2–0) (23)	Oklahoma (3–0)	Oklahoma (3–0)	Alabama (5–0) (21)	Alabama (6–0) (13)	Alabama (6–0) (26)	Alabama (7–0)	Alabama (8–0)	Texas Tech (9–0) (12)	Texas Tech (10–0) (21)	Texas Tech (10–0) (21)	Florida (10–1) (2)	Florida (11–1) (3)	Oklahoma (12–1) (9)	Utah (13–0) (16)	2.
3.	USC (12)	Ohio State (1–0) (15)	Oklahoma (2–0) (2)	Georgia (3–0) (2)	Georgia (4–0) (2)	LSU (4–0)	Missouri (5–0) (1)	Penn State (7–0)	Penn State (8–0)	Penn State (9–0)	Penn State (9–0) (6)	Florida (8–1)	Florida (9–1) (2)	Oklahoma (10–1)	Texas (11–1)	Texas (11–1) (6)	USC (12–1) (1)	3.
4.	Oklahoma (4)	Oklahoma (1–0) (2)	Florida (2–0) (4)	Florida (2–0) (1)	Florida (3–0) (1)	Missouri (4–0) (1)	LSU (4–0)	Oklahoma (5–1)	Oklahoma (6–1)	Oklahoma (7–1)	Florida (7–1) (1)	Texas (9–1)	Texas (10–1)	Texas (10–1)	Oklahoma (11–1)	Alabama (12–1)	Texas (12–1)	4.
5.	Florida (6)	Florida (1–0) (5)	Ohio State (2–0) (1)	Missouri (3–0)	LSU (3–0)	Texas (4–0)	Texas (5–0)	Florida (5–1)	Florida (5–1)	Florida (6–1)	Texas (8–1)	Oklahoma (9–1)	Oklahoma (9–1)	USC (9–1)	USC (10–1)	USC (11–1)	Oklahoma (12–2)	5.
6.	Missouri	Missouri (1–0) (1)	Missouri (2–0) (1)	LSU (2–0)	Missouri (4–0)	Penn State (5–0)	Penn State (6–0)	USC (4–1)	USC (5–1)	Texas Tech (8–0)	Oklahoma (8–1)	USC (8–1)	USC (9–1)	Penn State (11–1)	Penn State (11–1)	Penn State (11–1)	Alabama (12–2)	6.
7.	LSU	LSU (1–0) (1)	LSU (1–0) (1)	Texas (2–0)	Texas (3–0)	Texas Tech (4–0)	Texas Tech (5–0)	Texas Tech (6–0)	Oklahoma State (7–0)	USC (6–1)	USC (7–1)	Penn State (9–1)	Penn State (10–1)	Texas Tech (10–1)	Utah (12–0)	Utah (12–0)	TCU (11–2)	7.
8.	West Virginia	West Virginia (1–0)	Texas (2–0)	Wisconsin (3–0)	Alabama (4–0)	BYU (4–0)	USC (3–1)	Oklahoma State (6–0)	Texas Tech (7–0)	Georgia (7–1)	Oklahoma State (8–1)	Utah (10–0)	Utah (11–0)	Utah (12–0)	Texas Tech (11–1)	Texas Tech (11–1)	Penn State (11–2)	8.
9.	Clemson	Auburn (1–0)	Auburn (2–0)	Alabama (3–0)	Wisconsin (3–0)	USC (2–1)	BYU (5–0)	BYU (6–0)	Georgia (6–1)	Oklahoma State (7–1)	Boise State (8–0)	Boise State (9–0)	Boise State (10–0)	Boise State (11–0)	Boise State (12–0)	Boise State (12–0)	Ohio State (10–3)	9.
10.	Auburn	Texas (1–0)	Wisconsin (2–0)	Auburn (3–0)	Texas Tech (4–0)	South Florida (5–0)	Georgia (4–1)	Georgia (5–1)	Ohio State (7–1)	Utah (8–0)	Utah (9–0)	Ohio State (8–2)	Ohio State (9–2)	Ohio State (10–2)	Ohio State (10–2)	Ohio State (10-2)	Oregon (10–3)	10.
11.	Texas	Wisconsin (1–0)	Alabama (2–0)	Texas Tech (3–0)	BYU (4–0)	Georgia (4–1)	Florida (4–1)	Missouri (5–1)	LSU (5–1)	Boise State (7–0)	TCU (9–1)	Oklahoma State (8–2)	Oklahoma State (9–2)	Oklahoma State (9–2)	TCU (10–2)	TCU (10–2)	Boise State (12–1)	11.
12.	Texas Tech	Texas Tech (1–0)	Texas Tech (2–0)	South Florida (3–0)	Penn State (4–0)	Florida (3–1)	Ohio State (5–1)	Ohio State (6–1)	Utah (8–0)	TCU (8–1)	Ohio State (7–2)	Missouri (8–2)	Missouri (9–2)	Missouri (9–2)	Ball State (12–0)	Cincinnati (11–2)	Texas Tech (11–2)	12.
13.	Wisconsin	Alabama (1–0)	Kansas (2–0)	Ohio State (2–1)	South Florida (4–0)	Auburn (4–1)	Vanderbilt (5–0)	LSU (4–1)	Boise State (6–0)	Ohio State (7–2)	Missouri (7–2)	Georgia (8–2)	Georgia (9–2)	Georgia (9–2)	Cincinnati (10–2)	Oklahoma State (9–3)	Georgia (10–3)	13.
14.	Kansas	Kansas (1–0)	East Carolina (2–0)	BYU (3–0)	Ohio State (3–1)	Ohio State (4–1)	Utah (6–0)	Utah (7–0)	South Florida (6–1)	Missouri (6–2)	Georgia (7–2)	Ball State (9–0)	Ball State (10–0)	TCU (10–2)	Oklahoma State (9–3)	Georgia Tech (9–3)	Ole Miss (9–4)	14.
15.	Arizona State	Arizona State (1–0) т	Arizona State (2–0)	East Carolina (3–0)	Auburn (3–1)	Utah (5–0)	Boise State (4–0)	Boise State (5–0)	TCU (7–1)	LSU (5–2)	LSU (6–2)	TCU (9–2)	TCU (9–2)	Ball State (11–0)	Georgia Tech (9–3)	Oregon (9–3)	Virginia Tech (10–4)	15.
16.	BYU	BYU (1–0) т	Oregon (2–0)	Penn State (3–0)	Wake Forest (3–0)	Kansas (3–1)	Kansas (4–1)	Kansas (5–1)	Missouri (5–2)	Florida State (6–1)	Ball State (8–0)	BYU (9–1)	BYU (10–1)	Cincinnati (9–2)	Oregon (9–3)	Georgia (9–3)	Oklahoma State (9–4)	16.
17.	Virginia Tech	South Florida (1–0)	Penn State (2–0)	Oregon (3–0)	Utah (4–0)	Boise State (3–0)	Oklahoma State (5–0)	Virginia Tech (5–1)	Pittsburgh (5–1)	BYU (7–1)	BYU (8–1)	North Carolina (7–2)	Michigan State (9–2)	Oregon State (8–3)	Georgia (9–3)	BYU (10–2)	Cincinnati (11–3)	17.
18.	Tennessee	Oregon (1–0)	BYU (2–0)	Wake Forest (2–0)	Kansas (3–1)	Wisconsin (3–1)	Virginia Tech (5–1)	North Carolina (5–1)	BYU (6–1)	Ball State (8–0)	Michigan State (8–2)	Michigan State (9–2)	LSU (7–3)	Georgia Tech (8–3)	Boston College (9–3)	Pittsburgh (9–3)	Oregon State (9–4)	18.
19.	South Florida	Penn State (1–0)	South Florida (2–0)	Kansas (2–1)	Boise State (3–0)	Vanderbilt (4–0)	South Florida (5–1)	South Florida (5–1)	Kansas (5–2)	Tulsa (7–0)	North Carolina (6–2)	LSU (6–3)	Cincinnati (8–2)	Oregon (8–3)	Missouri (9–3)	Michigan State (9–3)	Missouri (10–4)	19.
20.	Illinois	Wake Forest (1–0)	Wake Forest (2–0)	Utah (3–0)	Clemson (3–1)	Virginia Tech (4–1)	Auburn (4–2)	Michigan State (6–1)	Ball State (7–0)	Minnesota (7–1)	West Virginia (6–2)	Florida State (7–2)	Pittsburgh (7–2)	Boston College (8–3) т	BYU (10–2)	Ole Miss (8–4)	Iowa (9–4)	20.
21.	Oregon	Fresno State (1–0)	Fresno State (1–0)	West Virginia (1–1)	Vanderbilt (4–0)	Oklahoma State (4–0)	Wake Forest (3–1)	Wake Forest (4–1)	Georgia Tech (6–1)	North Carolina (6–2)	California (6–2)	Pittsburgh (7–2)	Oregon State (7–3)	BYU (10–2) т	Michigan State (9–3)	Virginia Tech (9–4)	Florida State (9–4)	21.
22.	Penn State	Utah (1–0)	Utah (2–0)	Illinois (2–1)	Illinois (2–1)	Fresno State (3–1)	North Carolina (4–1)	Vanderbilt (5–1)	Tulsa (7–0)	Michigan State (7–2)	Georgia Tech (7–2)	Cincinnati (7–2)	Maryland (7–3)	Michigan State (9–3)	Ole Miss (8–4)	Northwestern (9–3)	Georgia Tech (9–4)	22.
23.	Wake Forest	UCLA (1–0)	California (2–0)	Clemson (2–1)	East Carolina (3–1)	Oregon (4–1)	Michigan State (5–1)	Pittsburgh (4–1)	Boston College (5–1)	Oregon (6–2)	Maryland (6–2)	Oregon State (6–3)	Miami (FL) (7–3)	Florida State (8–3)	Pittsburgh (8–3)	Ball State (12–1)	West Virginia (9–4)	23.
24.	Alabama	Illinois (0–1) т	Illinois (1–1)	Florida State (2–0)	TCU (4–0)	Connecticut (5–0)	Pittsburgh (4–1)	Ball State (7–0)	Florida State (5–1)	South Florida (6–2)	Florida State (6–2)	South Carolina (7–3)	Oregon (8–3)	Northwestern (9–3)	Northwestern (9–3)	Oregon State (8–4)	Michigan State (9–4)	24.
25.	Pittsburgh	South Carolina (1–0) т	West Virginia (1–1)	Fresno State (1–1)	Fresno State (2–1)	Wake Forest (3–1)	Ball State (6–0)	California (4–1)	Minnesota (6–1)	Maryland (6–2)	Pittsburgh (6–2)	Tulsa (8–1)	North Carolina (7–3)	Ole Miss (7–4)	Oregon State (8–4)	Missouri (9–4)	BYU (10–3)	25.
	Preseason Aug 16	Week 1 Sept 2	Week 2 Sept 7	Week 3 Sept 14	Week 4 Sept 21	Week 5 Sept 28	Week 6 Oct 5	Week 7 Oct 12	Week 8 Oct 19	Week 9 Oct 26	Week 10 Nov 2	Week 11 Nov 9	Week 12 Nov 16	Week 13 Nov 23	Week 14 Nov 30	Week 15 Dec 7	Week 16 (Final) Jan 9	
		Dropped: Clemson; Virginia Tech; Tennessee; Pittsburgh	Dropped: UCLA; South Carolina	Dropped: Arizona State; California	Dropped: Oregon; West Virginia; Florida State	Dropped: Clemson; Illinois; East Carolina; TCU	Dropped: Wisconsin; Oregon; Fresno State; Connecticut	Dropped: Auburn	Dropped: Virginia Tech; North Carolina; Michigan State; Wake Forest; Vanderbilt; California	Dropped: Pittsburgh; Kansas; Georgia Tech; Boston College	Dropped: Tulsa; Minnesota; Oregon; South Florida	Dropped: West Virginia; California; Georgia Tech; Maryland	Dropped: Florida State; South Carolina; Tulsa	Dropped: LSU; Pittsburgh; Maryland; Miami (FL); North Carolina	Dropped: Florida State	Dropped: Boston College	Dropped: Pittsburgh; Northwestern; Ball State	

== Coaches Poll ==
The final Coaches Poll of the 2008 season (technically taking place in 2009) was notable in that the winner of the BCS Championship Game was not the unanimous number 1. While the coaches are obligated to vote the winner of that game, Utah coach Kyle Whittingham voted his team number 1 after they defeated favored Alabama in the 2009 Sugar Bowl and completed the only undefeated season (13–0).

	Preseason Aug 1	Week 1 Sept 2	Week 2 Sept 7	Week 3 Sept 14	Week 4 Sept 21	Week 5 Sept 28	Week 6 Oct 5	Week 7 Oct 12	Week 8 Oct 19	Week 9 Oct 26	Week 10 Nov 2	Week 11 Nov 9	Week 12 Nov 16	Week 13 Nov 23	Week 14 Nov 30	Week 15 Dec 7	Week 16 (Final) Jan 9	
1.	Georgia (22)	USC (1–0) (23)	USC (1–0) (34)	USC (2–0) (57)	USC (2–0) (56)	Oklahoma (4–0) (57)	Oklahoma (5–0) (60)	Texas (6–0) (44)	Texas (7–0) (58)	Texas (8–0) (58)	Alabama (9–0) (40)	Alabama (10–0) (44)	Alabama (11–0) (45)	Alabama (11–0) (56)	Alabama (12–0) (58)	Oklahoma (12–1) (31)	Florida (13–1) (60)	1.
2.	USC (14)	Georgia (1–0) (20)	Georgia (2–0) (18)	Oklahoma (3–0) (1)	Oklahoma (3–0) (2)	LSU (4–0) (1)	Missouri (5–0)	Alabama (6–0) (14)	Alabama (7–0) (1)	Alabama (8–0)	Penn State (9–0) (14)	Texas Tech (10–0) (17)	Texas Tech (10–0) (15)	Oklahoma (10–1) (4)	Oklahoma (11–1) (2)	Florida (12–1) (26)	USC (12–1)	2.
3.	Ohio State (14)	Ohio State (1–0) (10)	Oklahoma (2–0) (3)	Georgia (3–0) (2)	Georgia (4–0) (2)	Missouri (4–0)	LSU (4–0) (1)	Penn State (7–0) (3)	Penn State (8–0) (2)	Penn State (9–0) (3)	Texas Tech (9–0) (6)	Florida (8–1)	Florida (9–1) (1)	Florida (10–1) (1)	Texas (11–1)	Texas (11–1) (4)	Texas (12–1)	3.
4.	Oklahoma (3)	Oklahoma (1–0) (2)	Florida (2–0) (3)	Florida (2–0) (1)	Florida (3–0) (1)	Alabama (5–0) (2)	Alabama (6–0)	USC (4–1)	USC (5–1)	Oklahoma (7–1)	Oklahoma (8–1) (1)	Oklahoma (9–1)	Texas (10–1)	Texas (10–1)	Florida (11–1) (1)	Alabama (12–1) т	Utah (13–0) (1)	4.
5.	Florida (5)	Florida (1–0) (3)	Ohio State (2–0) (1)	Missouri (3–0)	Missouri (4–0)	Texas (4–0) (1)	Texas (5–0)	Texas Tech (6–0)	Oklahoma (6–1)	Texas Tech (8–0)	Florida (7–1)	Texas (9–1)	Oklahoma (9–1)	USC (9–1)	USC (10–1)	USC (11–1) т	Oklahoma (12–2)	5.
6.	LSU (3)	LSU (1–0) (3)	Missouri (2–0)	LSU (2–0)	LSU (3–0)	Penn State (5–0)	Penn State (6–0)	Oklahoma (5–1)	Texas Tech (7–0)	USC (6–1)	USC (7–1)	USC (8–1)	USC (9–1)	Penn State (11–1)	Penn State (11–1)	Penn State (11–1)	Alabama (12–2)	6.
7.	Missouri	Missouri (1–0)	LSU (1–0) (2)	Texas (2–0)	Texas (3–0)	BYU (4–0)	Texas Tech (5–0)	Florida (5–1)	Florida (5–1)	Florida (6–1)	Texas (8–1)	Utah (10–0)	Utah (11–0)	Utah (12–0)	Utah (12–0)	Utah (12–0)	TCU (11–2)	7.
8.	West Virginia	West Virginia (1–0)	Texas (2–0)	Wisconsin (3–0)	Wisconsin (3–0)	Texas Tech (4–0)	BYU (5–0)	BYU (6–0)	Oklahoma State (7–0)	Georgia (7–1)	Oklahoma State (8–1)	Penn State (9–1)	Penn State (10–1)	Texas Tech (10–1)	Texas Tech (11–1)	Texas Tech (11–1)	Penn State (11–2)	8.
9.	Clemson	Texas (1–0)	Auburn (2–0)	Auburn (3–0)	Texas Tech (4–0)	USC (2–1)	USC (3–1)	Georgia (5–1)	Georgia (6–1)	Utah (8–0)	Utah (9–0)	Boise State (9–0)	Boise State (10–0)	Boise State (11–0)	Boise State (12–0)	Boise State (12–0)	Oregon (10–3)	9.
10.	Texas	Auburn (1–0)	Wisconsin (2–0)	Texas Tech (3–0)	Alabama (4–0)	Georgia (4–1) т	Georgia (4–1)	Oklahoma State (6–0)	Ohio State (7–1)	Oklahoma State (7–1)	Boise State (8–0)	Ohio State (8–2)	Ohio State (9–2)	Ohio State (10–2)	Ohio State (10–2)	Ohio State (10–2)	Georgia (10–3)	10.
11.	Auburn	Wisconsin (1–0)	Kansas (2–0)	BYU (3–0)	BYU (4–0)	South Florida (5–0) т	Ohio State (5–1)	Ohio State (6–1)	LSU (5–1)	Boise State (7–0)	TCU (9–1)	Missouri (8–2)	Missouri (9–2)	Missouri (9–2)	TCU (10–2)	TCU (10–2)	Ohio State (10–3)	11.
12.	Wisconsin	Kansas (1–0)	Texas Tech (2–0)	Oregon (3–0)	Penn State (4–0)	Ohio State (4–1)	Florida (4–1)	Missouri (5–1)	Utah (8–0)	TCU (8–1)	Ohio State (7–2)	Georgia (8–2)	Oklahoma State (9–2)	Oklahoma State (9–2)	Cincinnati (10–2)	Cincinnati (11–2)	Texas Tech (11–2)	12.
13.	Kansas	Texas Tech (1–0)	Arizona State (2–0)	Alabama (3–0)	Ohio State (3–1)	Florida (3–1)	Utah (6–0)	Utah (7–0)	Boise State (6–0)	Ohio State (7–2)	Missouri (7–2)	Oklahoma State (8–2)	Georgia (9–2)	Georgia (9–2)	Ball State (12–0)	Oregon (9–3)	Boise State (12–1)	13.
14.	Texas Tech	Arizona State (1–0)	Oregon (2–0)	Ohio State (2–1)	South Florida (4–0)	Auburn (4–1)	Vanderbilt (5–0)	LSU (4–1)	South Florida (6–1)	Missouri (6–2)	Georgia (7–2)	BYU (9–1)	BYU (10–1)	TCU (10–2)	Oregon (9–3)	Oklahoma State (9–3)	Virginia Tech (10–4)	14.
15.	Virginia Tech	BYU (1–0)	BYU (2–0)	Penn State (3–0)	Wake Forest (3–0)	Utah (5–0)	Kansas (4–1)	Kansas (5–1)	TCU (7–1)	LSU (5–2)	LSU (6–2)	Michigan State (9–2)	Michigan State (9–2)	Ball State (11–0)	Oklahoma State (9–3)	Georgia Tech (9–3)	Ole Miss (9–4)	15.
16.	Arizona State	Oregon (1–0)	Alabama (2–0)	South Florida (3–0)	Auburn (3–1)	Kansas (3–1)	Boise State (4–0)	Boise State (5–0)	Missouri (5–2)	Florida State (6–1)	BYU (8–1)	Ball State (9–0)	Ball State (10–0)	Cincinnati (9–2)	Georgia Tech (9–3)	BYU (10–2)	Missouri (10–4)	16.
17.	BYU	Alabama (1–0)	Penn State (2–0)	East Carolina (3–0)	Utah (4–0)	Wisconsin (3–1)	Oklahoma State (5–0)	Michigan State (6–1)	BYU (6–1)	BYU (7–1)	Michigan State (8–2)	North Carolina (7–2)	TCU (9–2)	Oregon State (8–3)	Missouri (9–3)	Georgia (9–3)	Cincinnati (11–3)	17.
18.	Tennessee	South Florida (1–0)	South Florida (2–0)	Wake Forest (2–0)	Kansas (3–1)	Boise State (3–0)	Virginia Tech (5–1)	Virginia Tech (5–1)	Kansas (5–2)	Tulsa (7–0)	Ball State (8–0)	TCU (9–2)	LSU (7–3)	Oregon (8–3)	BYU (10–2)	Michigan State (9–3)	Oklahoma State (9–4)	18.
19.	Illinois	Penn State (1–0)	Wake Forest (2–0)	Kansas (2–1)	Clemson (3–1)	Vanderbilt (4–0)	Michigan State (5–1)	Wake Forest (4–1)	Tulsa (7–0)	Ball State (8–0)	North Carolina (6–2)	Florida State (7–2)	Pittsburgh (7–2)	BYU (10–2)	Georgia (9–3)	Virginia Tech (9–4)	Oregon State (9–4)	19.
20.	Oregon	Wake Forest (1–0)	East Carolina (2–0)	Utah (3–0)	Boise State (3–0)	Oregon (4–1)	South Florida (5–1)	South Florida (5–1)	Pittsburgh (5–1)	Minnesota (7–1)	Georgia Tech (7–2)	LSU (6–3)	Cincinnati (8–2)	Northwestern (9–3)	Boston College (9–3)	Northwestern (9–3)	Iowa (9–4)	20.
21.	South Florida	Fresno State (1–0)	Fresno State (1–0)	Clemson (2–1)	Illinois (2–1)	Fresno State (3–1)	Wake Forest (3–1)	North Carolina (5–1)	Georgia Tech (6–1)	Michigan State (7–2)	Maryland (6–2)	Pittsburgh (7–2)	Oregon State (7–3)	Michigan State (9–3)	Michigan State (9–3)	Pittsburgh (9–3)	BYU (10–3)	21.
22.	Penn State	Clemson (0–1)	Utah (2–0)	West Virginia (1–1)	Oregon (3–1)	Oklahoma State (4–0)	Northwestern (5–0)	California (4–1)	Ball State (7–0)	North Carolina (6–2)	California (6–2)	Cincinnati (7–2)	Oregon (8–3)	Boston College (8–3)	Northwestern (9–3)	Ball State (12–1)	Georgia Tech (9–4)	22.
23.	Wake Forest	Utah (1–0)	Clemson (1–1)	Illinois (2–1)	TCU (4–0)	Connecticut (5–0)	Auburn (4–2)	Vanderbilt (5–1)	Florida State (5–1)	South Florida (6–2)	West Virginia (6–2)	South Carolina (7–3)	Maryland (7–3)	Georgia Tech (8–3)	Pittsburgh (8–3)	Missouri (9–4)	Florida State (9–4)	23.
24.	Michigan	South Carolina (1–0)	West Virginia (1–1)	Arizona State (2–1)	Fresno State (2–1)	Virginia Tech (4–1)	Wisconsin (3–2)	TCU (6–1)	Northwestern (6–1)	Oregon (6–2)	Florida State (6–2)	Tulsa (8–1)	Northwestern (8–3)	Florida State (8–3)	Oregon State (8–4)	Ole Miss (8–4)	Michigan State (9–4)	24.
25.	Fresno State	Illinois (0–1)	California (2–0)	Florida State (2–0)	Vanderbilt (4–0)	Wake Forest (3–1)	California (4–1)	Ball State (7–0)	Minnesota (6–1)	Maryland (6–2)	Northwestern (7–2)	Oregon State (6–3)	Boston College (7–3)	West Virginia (7–3)	Ole Miss (8–4)	Oregon State (8–4)	California (9–4)	25.
	Preseason Aug 1	Week 1 Sept 2	Week 2 Sept 7	Week 3 Sept 14	Week 4 Sept 21	Week 5 Sept 28	Week 6 Oct 5	Week 7 Oct 12	Week 8 Oct 19	Week 9 Oct 26	Week 10 Nov 2	Week 11 Nov 9	Week 12 Nov 16	Week 13 Nov 23	Week 14 Nov 30	Week 15 Dec 7	Week 16 (Final) Jan 9	
		Dropped: Virginia Tech; Tennessee; Michigan	Dropped: South Carolina; Illinois	Dropped: Fresno State; California	Dropped: East Carolina; West Virginia; Arizona State; Florida State	Dropped: Clemson; Illinois; TCU	Dropped: Oregon; Fresno State; Connecticut	Dropped: Northwestern; Auburn; Wisconsin	Dropped: Michigan State; Virginia Tech; Wake Forest; North Carolina; California; Vanderbilt	Dropped: Kansas; Pittsburgh; Georgia Tech; Northwestern	Dropped: Tulsa; Minnesota; South Florida; Oregon	Dropped: Georgia Tech; Maryland; California; West Virginia; Northwestern	Dropped: North Carolina; Florida State; South Carolina; Tulsa	Dropped: LSU; Pittsburgh; Maryland	Dropped: Florida State; West Virginia	Dropped: Boston College	Dropped: Northwestern; Pittsburgh; Ball State	

== Harris Interactive Poll ==
	Week 5 Sept 28	Week 6 Oct 5	Week 7 Oct 12	Week 8 Oct 19	Week 9 Oct 26	Week 10 Nov 2	Week 11 Nov 9	Week 12 Nov 16	Week 13 Nov 23	Week 14 Nov 30	Week 15 (Final) Dec 7	
1.	Oklahoma (4–0) (102)	Oklahoma (5–0) (106)	Texas (6–0) (72)	Texas (7–0) (104)	Texas (8–0) (103)	Alabama (9–0) (79)	Alabama (10–0) (75)	Alabama (11–0) (80)	Alabama (11–0) (108)	Alabama (12–0) (107)	Florida (12–1) (77)	1.
2.	LSU (4–0) (3)	LSU (4–0) (2)	Alabama (6–0) (37)	Alabama (7–0) (6)	Alabama (8–0) (6)	Penn State (9–0) (17)	Texas Tech (10–0) (38)	Texas Tech (10–0) (32)	Florida (10–1) (3)	Florida (11–1) (4)	Oklahoma (12–1) (26)	2.
3.	Alabama (5–0) (7)	Alabama (6–0) (6)	Penn State (7–0) (4)	Penn State (8–0) (3)	Penn State (9–0) (5)	Texas Tech (9–0) (16)	Florida (8–1) (1)	Florida (9–1) (1)	Oklahoma (10–1) (2)	Texas (11–1) (1)	Texas (11–1) (9)	3.
4.	Missouri (4–0) (1)	Missouri (5–0)	Oklahoma (5–1)	Oklahoma (6–1)	Oklahoma (7–1)	Florida (7–1) (1)	Texas (9–1)	Texas (10–1)	Texas (10–1)	Oklahoma (11–1)	Alabama (12–1)	4.
5.	Texas (4–0) (1)	Texas (5–0)	USC (4–1)	USC (5–1)	Texas Tech (8–0)	Oklahoma (8–1)	Oklahoma (9–1)	Oklahoma (9–1)	USC (9–1)	USC (10–1)	USC (11–1)	5.
6.	Penn State (5–0)	Penn State (6–0)	Florida (5–1)	Florida (5–1)	Florida (6–1)	Texas (8–1) (1)	USC (8–1)	USC (9–1)	Penn State (11–1)	Penn State (11–1)	Penn State (11–1)	6.
7.	USC (2–1)	Texas Tech (5–0)	Texas Tech (6–0)	Texas Tech (7–0)	USC (6–1)	USC (7–1)	Penn State (9–1)	Penn State (10–1)	Texas Tech (10–1)	Utah (12–0) (1)	Utah (12–0) (1)	7.
8.	Texas Tech (4–0)	USC (3–1)	BYU (6–0)	Oklahoma State (7–0)	Georgia (7–1)	Oklahoma State (8–1)	Utah (10–0)	Utah (11–0)	Utah (12–0) (1)	Texas Tech (11–1)	Texas Tech (11–1)	8.
9.	BYU (4–0)	BYU (5–0)	Georgia (5–1)	Georgia (6–1)	Oklahoma State (7–1)	Utah (9–0)	Boise State (9–0)	Boise State (10–0)	Boise State (11–0)	Boise State (12–0)	Boise State (12–0)	9.
10.	Georgia (4–1)	Georgia (4–1)	Oklahoma State (6–0)	Ohio State (7–1)	Utah (8–0)	Boise State (8–0)	Ohio State (8–2)	Ohio State (9–2)	Ohio State (10–2)	Ohio State (10–2)	Ohio State (10–2)	10.
11.	Florida (3–1)	Florida (4–1)	Missouri (5–1)	LSU (5–1)	Boise State (7–0)	Ohio State (7–2)	Missouri (8–2)	Missouri (9–2)	Missouri (9–2)	Ball State (12–0)	TCU (10–2)	11.
12.	South Florida (5–0)	Ohio State (5–1)	LSU (4–1)	Utah (8–0) (1)	Ohio State (7–2)	TCU (9–1)	Georgia (8–2)	Georgia (9–2)	Oklahoma State (9–2)	TCU (10–2)	Cincinnati (11–2)	12.
13.	Auburn (4–1)	Utah (6–0)	Ohio State (6–1)	Boise State (6–0)	TCU (8–1)	Missouri (7–2)	Oklahoma State (8–2)	Oklahoma State (9–2)	Georgia (9–2)	Cincinnati (10–2)	Oklahoma State (9–3)	13.
14.	Ohio State (4–1)	Vanderbilt (5–0)	Utah (7–0) (1)	South Florida (6–1)	Missouri (6–2)	Georgia (7–2)	BYU (9–1)	BYU (10–1)	Ball State (11–0)	Oklahoma State (9–3)	Georgia Tech (9–3)	14.
15.	Utah (5–0)	Boise State (4–0)	Boise State (5–0)	TCU (7–1)	BYU (7–1)	LSU (6–2)	Ball State (9–0)	Ball State (10–0)	TCU (10–2)	Oregon (9–3)	Oregon (9–3)	15.
16.	Wisconsin (3–1)	Kansas (4–1)	Kansas (5–1)	Missouri (5–2)	LSU (5–2)	BYU (8–1)	Michigan State (9–2)	Michigan State (9–2)	Cincinnati (9–2)	Georgia Tech (9–3)	BYU (10–2)	16.
17.	Kansas (3–1)	Oklahoma State (5–0)	Virginia Tech (5–1)	BYU (6–1)	Ball State (8–0)	Ball State (8–0)	North Carolina (7–2)	TCU (9–2)	Oregon State (8–3)	BYU (10–2)	Georgia (9–3)	17.
18.	Boise State (3–0)	Virginia Tech (5–1)	Michigan State (6–1)	Pittsburgh (5–1)	Florida State (6–1)	Michigan State (8–2)	TCU (9–2)	LSU (7–3)	BYU (10–2)	Missouri (9–3)	Michigan State (9–3)	18.
19.	Vanderbilt (4–0)	South Florida (5–1)	South Florida (5–1)	Kansas (5–2)	Tulsa (7–0)	North Carolina (6–2)	LSU (6–3)	Pittsburgh (7–2)	Oregon (8–3)	Boston College (9–3)	Pittsburgh (9–3)	19.
20.	Fresno State (3–1)	Auburn (4–2)	North Carolina (5–1)	Ball State (7–0)	Minnesota (7–1)	Georgia Tech (7–2)	Florida State (7–2)	Cincinnati (8–2)	Boston College (8–3)	Georgia (9–3)	Ball State (12–1)	20.
21.	Oregon (4–1)	Michigan State (5–1)	Wake Forest (4–1)	Tulsa (7–0)	Michigan State (7–2)	California (7–2)	Pittsburgh (7–2)	Oregon State (7–3)	Michigan State (9–3)	Michigan State (9–3)	Northwestern (9–3)	21.
22.	Virginia Tech (4–1)	Wake Forest (3–1)	Vanderbilt (5–1)	Georgia Tech (6–1)	North Carolina (6–2)	West Virginia (6–2)	Tulsa (8–1)	Oregon (8–3)	Georgia Tech (8–3)	Northwestern (9–3)	Virginia Tech (9–4)	22.
23.	Oklahoma State (4–0)	Northwestern (5–0)	Ball State (7–0)	Florida State (5–1)	South Florida (6–2)	Maryland (6–2)	Cincinnati (7–2)	Maryland (7–3)	Florida State (8–3)	Pittsburgh (8–3)	Ole Miss (8–4)	23.
24.	Connecticut (5–0)	Wisconsin (3–2)	California (4–1)	Boston College (5–1)	Oregon (6–2)	Florida State (6–2)	South Carolina (7–3)	North Carolina (7–3)	Northwestern (9–3)	Ole Miss (8–4)	Missouri (9–4)	24.
25.	Wake Forest (3–1)	North Carolina (4–1)	Pittsburgh (4–1)	Minnesota (6–1)	California (5–2) т; Georgia Tech (6–2) т	Tulsa (8–1)	California (6–3)	Boston College (7–3)	Pittsburgh (7–3)	Oregon State (8–4)	Oregon State (8–4)	25.
	Week 5 Sept 28	Week 6 Oct 5	Week 7 Oct 12	Week 8 Oct 19	Week 9 Oct 26	Week 10 Nov 2	Week 11 Nov 9	Week 12 Nov 16	Week 13 Nov 23	Week 14 Nov 30	Week 15 (Final) Dec 7	
		Dropped: Fresno State; Oregon; Connecticut	Dropped: Auburn; Northwestern; Wisconsin	Dropped: Virginia Tech; Michigan State; North Carolina; Wake Forest; Vanderbilt; California	Dropped: Pittsburgh; Kansas; Boston College	Dropped: Minnesota; South Florida; Oregon	Dropped: Georgia Tech; Maryland; West Virginia	Dropped: Florida State; Tulsa; South Carolina; California	Dropped: LSU; Maryland; North Carolina	Dropped: Florida State	Dropped: Boston College	

== BCS standings ==
The Bowl Championship Series (BCS) determined the two teams that competed in the 2009 BCS National Championship Game.

	Week 8 Oct 19	Week 9 Oct 26	Week 10 Nov 2	Week 11 Nov 9	Week 12 Nov 16	Week 13 Nov 23	Week 14 Nov 30	Week 15 (Final) Dec 7	
1.	Texas (7–0)	Texas (8–0)	Alabama (9–0)	Alabama (10–0)	Alabama (11–0)	Alabama (11–0)	Alabama (12–0)	Oklahoma (12–1)	1.
2.	Alabama (7–0)	Alabama (8–0)	Texas Tech (9–0)	Texas Tech (10–0)	Texas Tech (10–0)	Texas (10–1)	Oklahoma (11–1)	Florida (12–1)	2.
3.	Penn State (8–0)	Penn State (9–0)	Penn State (9–0)	Texas (9–1)	Texas (10–1)	Oklahoma (10–1)	Texas (11–1)	Texas (11–1)	3.
4.	Oklahoma (6–1)	Oklahoma (7–1)	Texas (8–1)	Florida (8–1)	Florida (9–1)	Florida (10–1)	Florida (11–1)	Alabama (12–1)	4.
5.	USC (5–1)	USC (6–1)	Florida (7–1)	Oklahoma (9–1)	Oklahoma (9–1)	USC (9–1)	USC (10–1)	USC (11–1)	5.
6.	Oklahoma State (7–0)	Georgia (7–1)	Oklahoma (8–1)	USC (8–1)	USC (9–1)	Utah (12–0)	Utah (12–0)	Utah (12–0)	6.
7.	Georgia (6–1)	Texas Tech (8–0)	USC (7–1)	Utah (10–0)	Utah (11–0)	Texas Tech (10–1)	Texas Tech (11–1)	Texas Tech (11–1)	7.
8.	Texas Tech (7–0)	Florida (6–1)	Utah (9–0)	Penn State (9–1)	Penn State (10–1)	Penn State (11–1)	Penn State (11–1)	Penn State (11–1)	8.
9.	Ohio State (7–1)	Oklahoma State (7–1)	Oklahoma State (8–1)	Boise State (9–0)	Boise State (10–0)	Boise State (11–0)	Boise State (12–0)	Boise State (12–0)	9.
10.	Florida (5–1)	Utah (8–0)	Boise State (8–0)	Georgia (8–2)	Ohio State (9–2)	Ohio State (10–2)	Ohio State (10–2)	Ohio State (10–2)	10.
11.	Utah (8–0)	Boise State (7–0)	Ohio State (7–2)	Ohio State (8–2)	Georgia (9–2)	Georgia (9–2)	TCU (10–2)	TCU (10–2)	11.
12.	Boise State (6–0)	Ohio State (7–2)	TCU (9–1)	Missouri (8–2)	Oklahoma State (9–2)	Oklahoma State (9–2)	Ball State (12–0)	Cincinnati (11–2)	12.
13.	LSU (5–1)	TCU (8–1)	Georgia (7–2)	Oklahoma State (8–2)	Missouri (9–2)	Missouri (9–2)	Cincinnati (10–2)	Oklahoma State (9–3)	13.
14.	TCU (7–1)	Missouri (6–2)	Missouri (7–2)	Ball State (9–0)	BYU (10–1)	TCU (10–2)	Oklahoma State (9–3)	Georgia Tech (9–3)	14.
15.	Missouri (5–2)	Florida State (6–1)	BYU (8–1)	Michigan State (9–2)	Michigan State (9–2)	Ball State (11–0)	Georgia Tech (9–3)	Georgia (9–3)	15.
16.	South Florida (6–1)	Ball State (8–0)	LSU (6–2)	North Carolina (7–2)	TCU (9–2)	Cincinnati (9–2)	Georgia (9–3)	BYU (10–2)	16.
17.	Pittsburgh (5–1)	Minnesota (7–1)	Ball State (8–0)	BYU (9–1)	Ball State (10–0)	Oregon State (8–3)	Boston College (9–3)	Oregon (9–3)	17.
18.	Georgia Tech (6–1)	Tulsa (7–0)	Michigan State (8–2)	TCU (9–2)	LSU (7–3)	BYU (10–2)	BYU (10–2)	Michigan State (9–3)	18.
19.	Tulsa (7–0)	LSU (5–2)	North Carolina (6–2)	Florida State (7–2)	Cincinnati (8–2)	Michigan State (9–3)	Oregon (9–3)	Virginia Tech (9–4)	19.
20.	Ball State (7–0)	BYU (7–1)	Georgia Tech (7–2)	LSU (6–3)	Pittsburgh (7–2)	Florida State (8–3)	Missouri (9–3)	Pittsburgh (9–3)	20.
21.	BYU (6–1)	Michigan State (7–2)	California (6–2)	Pittsburgh (7–2)	Oregon State (7–3)	Boston College (8–3)	Michigan State (9–3)	Missouri (9–4)	21.
22.	Northwestern (6–1)	North Carolina (6–2)	Florida State (6–2)	Cincinnati (7–2)	North Carolina (7–3)	Georgia Tech (8–3)	Northwestern (9–3)	Ball State (12–1)	22.
23.	Kansas (5–2)	South Florida (6–2)	Maryland (6–2)	Tulsa (8–1)	Miami (FL) (7–3)	Oregon (8–3)	Pittsburgh (8–3)	Northwestern (9–3)	23.
24.	Minnesota (6–1)	Oregon (6–2)	Northwestern (7–2)	Wake Forest (6–3)	Oregon (8–3)	Northwestern (9–3)	Florida State (8–4)	Boston College (9–4)	24.
25.	Florida State (5–1)	Connecticut (6–2)	West Virginia (6–2)	South Carolina (7–3)	Maryland (7–3)	Pittsburgh (7–3)	Virginia Tech (8–4)	Ole Miss (8–4)	25.
	Week 8 Oct 19	Week 9 Oct 26	Week 10 Nov 2	Week 11 Nov 9	Week 12 Nov 16	Week 13 Nov 23	Week 14 Nov 30	Week 15 (Final) Dec 7	
		Dropped: Pittsburgh; Georgia Tech; Northwestern; Kansas	Dropped: Minnesota; Tulsa; Oregon; South Florida; Connecticut	Dropped: Georgia Tech; California; Maryland; Northwestern; West Virginia	Dropped: Florida State; Wake Forest; Tulsa; South Carolina	Dropped: LSU; North Carolina; Miami (FL); Maryland	Dropped: Oregon State	Dropped: Florida State	
