= 2008 Champs Sports Bowl =

American college football game

Wisconsin Badgers	Florida State Seminoles
(7–5)	(8–4)
Big Ten	ACC
13	42
Head coach: Bret Bielema	Head coach: Bobby Bowden
	1	2	3	4	Total
Wisconsin	0	3	3	7	13
Florida State	0	14	14	14	42
- Date: December 27, 2008
- Season: 2008
- Stadium: Florida Citrus Bowl
- Location: Orlando, Florida
- MVP: P/PK Graham Gano (Florida State)
- Referee: Michael Batlan (Pac-10)
- Attendance: 52,692

United States TV coverage
- Network: ESPN
- Announcers: Brad Nessler, Bob Griese, Paul Maguire
- Nielsen ratings: 4.5

The 2008 Champs Sports Bowl was the 19th edition of the college football bowl game that was played on Saturday, December 27, 2008, at the Citrus Bowl in Orlando, Florida. The game, which had a 4:30 p.m. US EST kickoff and was broadcast on ESPN, pitted the Wisconsin Badgers against the Florida State Seminoles. At the end, the Florida State Seminoles were the winners, 42–13.

== Game summary ==
Scoring Play	Score
2nd Quarter
FSU - Derek Nicholson 75-yard fumble return (Graham Gano kick), 12:33	FSU 7-0
Wisconsin - Philip Welch 31-yard FG, 4:46	FSU 7-3
FSU - Greg Carr 15-yard TD pass from Christian Ponder (Gano kick), :07	FSU 14-3
3rd Quarter
Wisconsin - Welch 41-yard FG, 12:01	FSU 14-6
FSU - Antone Smith 6-yard TD run (Gano kick), 4:11	FSU 21-6
FSU - Carlton Jones 14-yard TD run (Gano kick), :18	FSU 28-6
4th Quarter
FSU - Dekoda Watson 51-yard fumble return (Gano kick), 14:28	FSU 35-6
FSU - Caz Piurowski 10-yard TD pass from Ponder (Gano kick), 11:04	FSU 42-6
Wisconsin - Elijah Theus 20-yard TD pass from Dustin Sherer, 4:06	FSU 42-13

Team Stats; Wisconsin - First downs 16, FSU- First downs 23. Wisconsin- Rush-Yds-TD's 38-201-0, FSU- Rush-Yds-TD's 38-134-2.Wisconsin- Cmp-Attd-Yd-TD-INT 9-16-132-1-0. FSU- Cmp-Attd-Yd-TD-INT 23-37-276-2-0. Wisconsin- Total yards 333, FSU- Total Yards 410. Wisconsin- Fumbles-Lost 3-3, FSU-Fumbles-Lost 0-0. Wisconsin- Turnovers 3, FSU-Turnovers 0. Wisconsin- Penalties-Yards 2-25, FSU- Penalties-Yards 7-85.

Kick&Punt returns: Player- Michael Ray Garvin, FSU- ret:4, Yd's:71, Avg: 17.8, TD: 0. Bert Reed, FSU- ret:2, Yd's:23, Avg:11, TD:0. Ochuko Jenije, FSU- ret:2, Yd's:6, Avg: 3.0, Td:0. Antonio Fenelus, Wisconsin- ret:2, Yd's: 50, Avg: 25.0, Td:0. Blake Sorensen Wisconsin- ret:1, Yd's:11, Avg:11.0, Td:0. Bill Rentmeester Wisconsin- ret:1, Yd's:1, Avg:1.0, Td:0. David Gilreath Wisconsin- ret:1, Yd's:3, Avg:3.0, TD:0.

Florida State's Graham Gano was able to kick three punts that died or went out of bounds inside Wisconsin's 3-yard line in the first quarter and a 58-yarder that was returned for 3 yards to the Wisconsin 7. He finished the game with 5 punts averaging 48.2 yards. He also drew a roughing the kicker penalty that extended a Florida State scoring drive (Replay revealed that he had not been touched). Gano was also the team's kicker and winner of the 2008 Lou Groza Award.
