= 2008 Wisconsin Badgers football team =

American college football season

2008 Wisconsin Badgers football

Champs Sports Bowl, L 13–42 vs. Florida State
- Conference: Big Ten Conference
- Record: 7–6 (3–5 Big Ten)
- Head coach: Bret Bielema (3rd season)
- Offensive coordinator: Paul Chryst (4th season)
- Offensive scheme: Pro-style
- Defensive coordinator: Dave Doeren (1st season)
- Base defense: 4–3
- MVP: Allen Langford
- Captains: DeAndre Levy; Mike Newkirk; Chris Pressley; Kraig Urbik
- Home stadium: Camp Randall Stadium

2008 Big Ten Conference football standings
| | Conf. | | | Overall |
| Team | W | | L | W | | L |
|---|---|---|---|---|---|---|
| No. 8 Penn State $+ | 7 | – | 1 | 11 | – | 2 |
| No. 9 Ohio State %+ | 7 | – | 1 | 10 | – | 3 |
| No. 24 Michigan State | 6 | – | 2 | 9 | – | 4 |
| Northwestern | 5 | – | 3 | 9 | – | 4 |
| No. 20 Iowa | 5 | – | 3 | 9 | – | 4 |
| Wisconsin | 3 | – | 5 | 7 | – | 6 |
| Minnesota | 3 | – | 5 | 7 | – | 6 |
| Illinois | 3 | – | 5 | 5 | – | 7 |
| Purdue | 2 | – | 6 | 4 | – | 8 |
| Michigan | 2 | – | 6 | 3 | – | 9 |
| Indiana | 1 | – | 7 | 3 | – | 9 |
$ – BCS representative as conference champion; % – BCS at-large representative; + – Conference co-champions; Rankings from AP Poll

The 2008 Wisconsin Badgers football team was an American football team that represented the University of Wisconsin–Madison as a member of the Big Ten Conference during the 2008 NCAA Division I FBS football season. In their third year under head coach Bret Bielema, the Badgers compiled a 7–6 record (3–5 in conference games), finished in a three-way tie for sixth place in the Big Ten, and outscored opponents by a total of 357 to 345. Against ranked opponents, the Badgers defeated No. 21 Fresno State and lost to No. 14 Ohio State, No. 6 Penn State, and No. 22 Michigan State. They concluded the season with a 42–13 loss to unranked Florida State in the Champs Sports Bowl. They were not ranked in the final AP and Coaches polls.

The team's statistical leaders included running back P. J. Hill (1,161 rushing yards, 13 touchdowns), quarterback Dustin Sherer (1,389 passing yards), wide receiver Garrett Graham (40 receptions for 540 yards), kicker Philip Welch (99 points scored), and Jaeve McFadden (84 total tackles).

The team played its home games at Camp Randall Stadium in Madison, Wisconsin.

== Schedule ==
| Date | Time | Opponent | Rank | Site | TV | Result | Attendance |
|---|---|---|---|---|---|---|---|
| August 30 | 11:00 a.m. | Akron* | No. 13 | Camp Randall Stadium; Madison, WI | BTN | W 38–17 | 80,910 |
| September 6 | 11:00 a.m. | Marshall* | No. 11 | Camp Randall Stadium; Madison, WI | BTN | W 51–14 | 80,396 |
| September 13 | 9:30 p.m. | at No. 21 Fresno State* | No. 10 | Bulldog Stadium; Fresno, CA | ESPN2 | W 13–10 | 42,387 |
| September 27 | 2:30 p.m. | at Michigan | No. 9 | Michigan Stadium; Ann Arbor, MI | ABC/ESPN | L 25–27 | 109,833 |
| October 4 | 7:00 p.m. | No. 12 Ohio State | No. 18 | Camp Randall Stadium; Madison, WI | ABC | L 17–20 | 81,608 |
| October 11 | 7:00 p.m. | No. 6 Penn State | | Camp Randall Stadium; Madison, WI | ESPN | L 7–48 | 81,524 |
| October 18 | 11:00 a.m. | at Iowa | | Kinnick Stadium; Iowa City, IA (rivalry) | BTN | L 16–38 | 70,585 |
| October 25 | 11:00 a.m. | Illinois^{†} | | Camp Randall Stadium; Madison, WI | ESPN2 | W 27–17 | 81,241 |
| November 1 | 11:00 a.m. | at No. 22 Michigan State | | Spartan Stadium; East Lansing, MI | ESPN | L 24–25 | 75,121 |
| November 8 | 11:00 a.m. | at Indiana | | Memorial Stadium; Bloomington, IN | BTN | W 55–20 | 30,618 |
| November 15 | 2:30 p.m. | Minnesota | | Camp Randall Stadium; Madison, WI (rivalry) | ABC | W 35–32 | 81,228 |
| November 22 | 2:30 p.m. | No. 3 (FCS) Cal Poly* | | Camp Randall Stadium; Madison, WI | BTN | W 36–35 ^{OT} | 80,709 |
| December 27 | 3:30 p.m. | vs. Florida State* | | Florida Citrus Bowl; Orlando, FL (Champs Sports Bowl) | ESPN | L 13–42 | 52,692 |
*Non-conference game; ^{†}Homecoming; Rankings from AP Poll released prior to the game; All times are in Central time

== Rankings ==
Ranking movements Legend: ██ Increase in ranking ██ Decrease in ranking
| | Week | | | | | | | | | | | | | | | |
| Poll | Pre | 1 | 2 | 3 | 4 | 5 | 6 | 7 | 8 | 9 | 10 | 11 | 12 | 13 | 14 | Final |
|---|---|---|---|---|---|---|---|---|---|---|---|---|---|---|---|---|
| AP | 13 | 11 | 10 | 8 | 9 | 18 | | | | | | | | | | |
| Coaches | 12 | 11 | 10 | 8 | 8 | 17 | 24 | | | | | | | | | |
| Harris | Not released | | | | | 16 | | | | | | | | | | Not released |
| BCS | Not released | | | | | | | | | | | | | | | Not released |

== Game summaries ==
=== Akron ===
| | 1 | 2 | 3 | 4 | Total |
|---|---|---|---|---|---|
| Zips | 0 | 10 | 0 | 7 | 17 |
| Badgers | 14 | 3 | 14 | 7 | 38 |

=== Marshall ===
| | 1 | 2 | 3 | 4 | Total |
|---|---|---|---|---|---|
| Thundering Herd | 7 | 7 | 0 | 0 | 14 |
| Badgers | 0 | 17 | 21 | 13 | 51 |

=== Fresno State ===
| | 1 | 2 | 3 | 4 | Total |
|---|---|---|---|---|---|
| Badgers | 7 | 3 | 3 | 0 | 13 |
| Bulldogs | 0 | 0 | 10 | 0 | 10 |

=== Michigan ===
| | 1 | 2 | 3 | 4 | Total |
|---|---|---|---|---|---|
| Badgers | 6 | 13 | 0 | 6 | 25 |
| Wolverines | 0 | 0 | 7 | 20 | 27 |

=== Ohio State ===
| | 1 | 2 | 3 | 4 | Total |
|---|---|---|---|---|---|
| Buckeyes | 7 | 0 | 3 | 10 | 20 |
| Badgers | 0 | 10 | 0 | 7 | 17 |

=== Penn State ===
| | 1 | 2 | 3 | 4 | Total |
|---|---|---|---|---|---|
| Nittany Lions | 3 | 21 | 17 | 7 | 48 |
| Badgers | 0 | 7 | 0 | 0 | 7 |

=== Iowa ===
| | 1 | 2 | 3 | 4 | Total |
|---|---|---|---|---|---|
| Badgers | 0 | 3 | 6 | 7 | 16 |
| Hawkeyes | 7 | 7 | 14 | 10 | 38 |

=== Illinois ===
| | 1 | 2 | 3 | 4 | Total |
|---|---|---|---|---|---|
| Fighting Illini | 0 | 10 | 7 | 0 | 17 |
| Badgers | 3 | 7 | 7 | 10 | 27 |

=== Michigan State ===
| Team | 1 | 2 | 3 | 4 | Total |
|---|---|---|---|---|---|
| Badgers | 7 | 3 | 7 | 7 | 24 |
| • Spartans | 0 | 6 | 7 | 12 | 25 |

- Date: November 1
- Location: Spartan Stadium
  East Lansing, MI
- Game start: 11:02 a.m. CST
- Elapsed time: 3:34
- Game attendance: 75,121
- Game weather: 48F, Wind: NE 10 MPH, Mostly Sunny
- Referee: Bill LeMonniner
- TV announcers (ESPN): Pam Ward (Play-by-play) & Ray Bentley (Color)

=== Indiana ===
| | 1 | 2 | 3 | 4 | Total |
|---|---|---|---|---|---|
| Badgers | 14 | 10 | 17 | 14 | 55 |
| Hoosiers | 13 | 7 | 0 | 0 | 20 |

=== Minnesota ===
| Team | 1 | 2 | 3 | 4 | Total |
|---|---|---|---|---|---|
| Golden Gophers | 0 | 21 | 3 | 8 | 32 |
| • Badgers | 7 | 0 | 10 | 18 | 35 |

- Date: November 15
- Location: Camp Randall Stadium
  Madison, WI
- Game start: 2:35 p.m. CST
- Elapsed time: 3:40
- Game attendance: 81,228
- Game weather: 36F, Wind: NW 10 MPH, Cloudy
- Referee: Bill LeMonnier
- TV announcers (ABC/ESPN): Terry Gannon (Play-by-play) & David Norrie (Color)

Scoring summary
| 1 | 12:38 | WIS | Garrett Graham 2-yard pass from Dustin Sherer (Philip Welch kick) | Wisconsin 7-0 |
| 2 | 13:30 | MINN | Brandon Green 4-yard pass from Adam Weber (Joel Monroe kick) | Tie 7-7 |
| 2 | 11:14 | MINN | Brodrick Smith 43-yard pass from Adam Weber (Joel Monroe kick) | Minnesota 14-7 |
| 2 | 8:17 | MINN | Adam Weber 6-yard run (Joel Monroe kick) | Minnesota 21-7 |
| 3 | 10:14 | WIS | Philip Welch 47-yard field goal | Minnesota 21-10 |
| 3 | 4:17 | WIS | P.J. Hill 1-yard run (Philip Welch kick) | Minnesota 21-17 |
| 3 | 1:37 | MINN | Joel Monroe 30-yard field goal | Minnesota 24-17 |
| 4 | 13:25 | WIS | P.J. Hill 1-yard run (Philip Welch kick) | Tie 24-24 |
| 4 | 13:16 | WIS | Safety, ball fumbled out of end zone | Wisconsin 26-24 |
| 4 | 10:47 | WIS | Safety, Adam Weber tackled by Mike Newkirk in end zone | Wisconsin 28-24 |
| 4 | 6:59 | WIS | John Clay 5-yard run (Philip Welch kick) | Wisconsin 35-24 |
| 4 | 4:15 | MINN | Shady Salamon 13-yard pass from Adam Weber (Shady Salamon run) | Wisconsin 35-32 |

=== Cal Poly ===
| | 1 | 2 | 3 | 4 | OT | Total |
|---|---|---|---|---|---|---|
| Mustangs | 7 | 13 | 3 | 6 | 6 | 35 |
| Badgers | 0 | 14 | 7 | 8 | 7 | 36 |

== Personnel ==
=== Roster ===
(as of August 12, 2008)
| Quarterback: Allan Evridge - (redshirt) Senior; Bryson Baxley - Freshman(C); Dustin Sherer - (redshirt) Junior; James Stallons - (redshirt) Freshman; Scott Tolzien - (redshirt) Sophomore; Wide Receiver: Isaac Anderson - (redshirt) Sophomore; Nate Emanuel - (redshirt) Sophomore; David Gilreath - Sophomore; Xavier Harris - Junior; Kyle Jefferson - Sophomore; Daven Jones - Sophomore; Richard Kirtley - (redshirt) Junior; Eric Kossoris - (redshirt) Freshman; Maurice Moore - (redshirt) Sophomore; Cody Rose - (redshirt) Freshman; Elijah (T.J.) Theus - (redshirt) Junior; Nick Toon - (redshirt) Freshman; T.J. Williams - Freshman; Offensive Lineman: Jordan Bergmann - Freshman; Jake Bscherer - Junior; Robert Burge - Freshman; Gabe Carimi - (redshirt) Sophomore; Chris Cromwell - Freshman; Jake Current - Freshman; Andy Kemp - Senior; John Moffitt - (redshirt) Sophomore; Bill Nagy - (redshirt) Sophomore; Josh Oglesby - (redshirt) Freshman; Joe Schafer - Freshman; Kraig Urbik - (redshirt) Senior; Eric Vandenheuvel - Senior; Kevin Zeitler - Freshman | Fullback: Chris Pressley - (redshirt) Senior; Bill Rentmeester - (redshirt) Senior; Dan Wiacek - Junior; John Nelson - (redshirt) Sophomore; Running Back: Zach Brown - Sophomore; John Clay - (redshirt) Freshman; Bradie Ewing - Freshman; P.J. Hill - (redshirt) Junior; Tyler Holland - Junior; Dex Jones - Freshman; Mike Preisler - (redshirt) Freshman; Erik Smith - Freshman; Tight End: Travis Beckum - Senior; Jake Byrne - Freshman; Zach Davison - Freshman; Garrett Graham - (redshirt) Junior; Lance Kendricks - (redshirt) Sophomore; Rob Korslin - (redshirt) Freshman; Mickey Turner - Junior; Ricky Wagner - Freshman | Defensive Lineman: Eriks Briedis - Freshman; Patrick Butrym - (redshirt) Freshman; Dan Cascone - (redshirt) Junior; Jason Chapman - (redshirt) Senior; Kirk DeCremer - (redshirt) Sophomore; Ricky Garner - (redshirt) Sophomore; Jasper Grimes - (redshirt) Freshman; Jordan Hein - (redshirt) Junior; Brandon Hoey - (redshirt) Sophomore; Kenny Jones - (redshirt) Sophomore; Brendan Kelly - Freshman; Peter Konz - Freshman; Anthony Mains - Freshman; Dan Moore - Junior; Mike Newkirk - (redshirt) Senior; Louis Nzegwu - (redshirt) Freshman; O'Brien Schofield - (redshirt) Junior; Matt Shaughnessy - Senior; Jeff Stehle - (redshirt) Junior; J. J. Watt - Freshman; Tyler Westphal - Freshman; Linebacker: Jonathan Casillas - Senior; Ryan Flasch - (redshirt) Senior; Elijah Hodge - (redshirt) Junior; Leonhard Hubbard - Freshman; DeAndre Levy - Senior; Jaevery McFadden - (redshirt) Junior; Tony Megna - (redshirt) Freshman; Joshua Neal - (redshirt) Senior; Erik Prather - (redshirt) Junior; Tyrell Rosemeyer - Freshman; Kevin Rouse - (redshirt) Freshman; Blake Sorensen - Sophomore; Culver St. Jean - (redshirt) Sophomore; Mike Taylor - Freshman | Defensive Back: Niles Brinkley - (redshirt) Sophomore; Shane Carter - (redshirt) Junior; Kevin Claxton - Freshman; Marcus Cromartie - Freshman; Antonio Fenelus- Freshman; Mario Goins - (redshirt) Freshman; Adam Hampton - (redshirt) Freshman; William Hartmann - (redshirt) Junior; Aaron Henry - Sophomore; Shelton Johnson - Freshman; Allen Langford - (redshirt) Senior; Andrew Lukasko - (redshirt) Freshman; Chris Maragos - (redshirt) Junior; Otis Merrill - (redshirt) Freshman; Prince Moody - (redshirt) Junior; Josh Nettles - Junior; Chukwuma Offor - (redshirt) Freshman; Aubrey Pleasant - (redshirt) Junior; Devin Smith - Freshman; Jay Valai-Soph Long Snapper: Zach Opsal - (redshirt) Sophomore; Dave Peck - (redshirt) Senior; Kyle Wojta - (redshirt) Freshman; Drew Woodward - (redshirt) Junior; Punter: Brad Debauche - (redshirt) Freshman; Brad Nortman - Freshman; Place Kicker: Matt Fischer - (redshirt) Junior; Philip Welch - (redshirt) Freshman |

=== Coaching staff ===
| Name | Position |
|---|---|
| Bret Bielema | Head coach |
| Paul Chryst | Offensive coordinator/Quarterbacks coach |
| Dave Doeren | Defensive coordinator/Inside linebackers coach |
| Del Alexander | Wide receivers coach |
| Bob Bostad | Offensive line coach/Run game coordinator |
| Kerry Cooks | Defensive backs coach |
| Randall McCray | Outside linebackers coach/Recruiting coordinator |
| Charlie Partridge | Defensive line/Special teams coach |
| Joe Rudolph | Tight ends coach |
| John Settle | Running backs coach |
| Terrance Jamison | Student assistant |

=== Regular starters ===
| Position | Player |
|---|---|
| Quarterback | Dustin Sherer |
| Running back | P. J. Hill |
| Fullback | Chris Pressley |
| Wide receiver | Isaac Anderson |
| Wide receiver | David Gilreath |
| Tight end | Garrett Graham |
| Left tackle | Gabe Carimi |
| Left guard | Andy Kemp |
| Center | John Moffitt |
| Right guard | Kraig Urbik |
| Right tackle | Eric Vanden Heuvel |
| Kicker | Philip Welch |

| Position | Player |
|---|---|
| Defensive end | O'Brien Schofield |
| Defensive tackle | Jason Chapman |
| Defensive tackle | Mike Newkirk |
| Defensive end | Matt Shaughnessy |
| Outside linebacker | DeAndre Levy |
| Middle linebacker | Jaevery McFadden |
| Outside linebacker | Jonathan Casillas |
| Cornerback | Allen Langford |
| Strong safety | Jay Valai |
| Free safety | Shane Carter |
| Cornerback | Niles Brinkley |
| Punter | Brad Nortman |

== Statistics ==
=== Offense ===
==== Passing ====
| Name | GP-GS | Year | Att-Cmp-Int | Pct | Yds | TD | Avg/G |
|---|---|---|---|---|---|---|---|
| Allan Evridge | 6-6 | Sr (R) | 132-71-5 | 53.8% | 949 | 5 | 126.3 |
| Dustin Sherer | 11-7 | Jr (R) | 191-104-5 | 54.5% | 1389 | 6 | 158.2 |
| Scott Tolzien | 3-0 | So (R) | 5-8-1 | 62.5% | 107 | 0 | 35.7 |
| Total | 13-13 | N/A | 333-180-11 | 54.1% | 2445 | 11 | 188.2 |
| Opponents | 13-13 | N/A | 404-212-12 | 52.5% | 2545 | 15 | 195.8 |

==== Rushing ====
| Name | Att | Yards | Avg | Long | TD |
|---|---|---|---|---|---|
| P.J. Hill | 226 | 1161 | 5.1 | | 13 |
| John Clay | 155 | 844 | 5.7 | 46 | 9 |
| Zach Brown | 55 | 305 | 5.5 | 23 | 3 |
| David Gilreath | 25 | 285 | 11.4 | 90 (TD) | 2 |
| Bill Rentmeester | 11 | 50 | 4.5 | 9 | 0 |
| Isaac Anderson | 3 | 21 | 7.0 | 19 | 0 |
| Dustin Sherer | 49 | 19 | 0.4 | 30 | 1 |
| Bradie Ewing | 4 | 14 | 3.5 | 8 | 1 |
| Scott Tolzien | 4 | 13 | 3.3 | 8 | 1 |
| Chris Pressley | 3 | 6 | 2.0 | 3 | 0 |
| Allan Evridge | 23 | 4 | 0.2 | 19 | 1 |
| Total | 567 | 2,745 | 4.8 | 90 | 31 |
| Opponents | 450 | 1,733 | 3.8 | | 23 |

==== Receiving ====
| Name | GP | No. | Yds | Avg | TD | Long | Avg/G |
|---|---|---|---|---|---|---|---|
| Garrett Graham | 11 | 40 | 540 | 13.5 | 5 | | 49.1 |
| David Gilreath | 13 | 31 | 520 | 16.7 | 3 | | 40.0 |
| Isaac Anderson | 13 | 21 | 286 | 13.6 | 0 | | 22.0 |
| Travis Beckum | 6 | 23 | 264 | 11.4 | 0 | | 44.0 |
| Nick Toon | 12 | 17 | 257 | 15.1 | 1 | | 21.4 |
| Kyle Jefferson | 11 | 14 | 189 | 13.5 | 0 | | 17.2 |
| Lance Kendricks | 7 | 6 | 141 | 23.5 | 0 | | 20.1 |
| P.J. Hill | 13 | 7 | 72 | 10.3 | 0 | | 5.5 |
| Maurice Moore | 6 | 5 | 61 | 12.2 | 0 | | 10.2 |
| Zach Brown | 12 | 8 | 47 | 5.9 | 0 | | 3.9 |
| Mickey Turner | 13 | 4 | 46 | 11.5 | 0 | | 3.5 |
| Elijah Theus | 5 | 2 | 17 | 8.5 | 1 | | 3.4 |

== Team players selected in the 2009 NFL draft ==
| Player | Position | Round | Overall selection | NFL team |
|---|---|---|---|---|
| Matt Shaughnessy | Defensive end | 3 | 71 | Oakland Raiders |
| DeAndre Levy | Linebacker | 3 | 76 | Detroit Lions |
| Kraig Urbik | Guard | 3 | 79 | Pittsburgh Steelers |
| Travis Beckum | Tight end | 3 | 100 | New York Giants |
