= 2008 Florida State Seminoles football team =

American college football season

2008 Florida State Seminoles football

ACC Atlantic Division co-champion Champs Sports Bowl champion

Champs Sports Bowl, W 42–13 vs. Wisconsin
- Conference: Atlantic Coast Conference
- Atlantic Division

Ranking
- Coaches: No. 23
- AP: No. 21
- Record: 9–4 (5–3 ACC)
- Head coach: Bobby Bowden (33rd season)
- Offensive coordinator: Jimbo Fisher (2nd season)
- Offensive scheme: Pro-style
- Defensive coordinator: Mickey Andrews (25th season)
- Base defense: 4–3
- Captains: Antone Smith; Tony Carter; Benjamin Lampkin
- Home stadium: Doak Campbell Stadium

2008 Atlantic Coast Conference football standings
	Conf.			Overall
Team	W		L	W		L
Atlantic Division
Boston College xy	5	–	3	9	–	5
No. 21 Florida State x	5	–	3	9	–	4
Maryland	4	–	4	8	–	5
Wake Forest	4	–	4	8	–	5
Clemson	4	–	4	7	–	6
NC State	4	–	4	6	–	7
Coastal Division
No. 15 Virginia Tech xy$	5	–	3	10	–	4
No. 22 Georgia Tech x	5	–	3	9	–	4
North Carolina	0	–	4	0	–	5
Miami (FL)	4	–	4	7	–	6
Virginia	3	–	5	5	–	7
Duke	1	–	7	4	–	8
Championship: Virginia Tech 30, Boston College 12
$ – BCS representative as conference champion; x – Division champion/co-champions; y – Championship game participant; North Carolina vacated 8 wins, including 4 ACC wins; Rankings from AP Poll

The 2008 Florida State Seminoles football team represented the Florida State University as a member of the Atlantic Coast Conference (ACC) during the 2008 NCAA Division I FBS football season. Led by 33rd-year head coach Bobby Bowden, the Seminoles compiled an overall record of 9–4 with a mark of 5–3 in conference play, sharing the ACC's Atlantic Division title with Boston College. Florida State did not advance to the ACC Championship Game due to a head-to-head loss to Boston College. The Seminoles were invited to the Champs Sports Bowl, where they defeated Wisconsin. The team played home games at Doak Campbell Stadium in Tallahassee, Florida.

The Seminoles were without as many as 12 scholarship players for the first three games of the season because of suspensions carrying over from the previous season for violating team rules, although it has not been disclosed how many of those were involved with the Florida State University academic-athletic scandal. Junior wide receiver Preston Parker was suspended for the first two games of the season, after pleading guilty to two misdemeanor charges.

== Schedule ==
Date	Time	Opponent	Rank	Site	TV	Result	Attendance
September 6	6:00 p.m.	Western Carolina*		Doak Campbell Stadium; Tallahassee, FL	SUN PPV	W 69–0	73,024
September 13	3:45 p.m.	Chattanooga*		Doak Campbell Stadium; Tallahassee, FL	ESPNU	W 46–7	71,596
September 20	7:00 p.m.	No. 18 Wake Forest	No. 25	Doak Campbell Stadium; Tallahassee, FL	ESPN2	L 3–12	79,235
September 27	3:30 p.m.	vs. Colorado*		Jacksonville Municipal Stadium; Jacksonville, FL	ABC	W 39–21	46,716
October 4	3:30 p.m.	at Miami (FL)		Dolphin Stadium; Miami Gardens, FL (rivalry)	ABC, ESPN2	W 41–39	65,786
October 16	7:30 pm	at NC State		Carter–Finley Stadium; Raleigh, NC	ESPN	W 26–17	56,643
October 25	3:30 pm	Virginia Tech	No. 23	Doak Campbell Stadium; Tallahassee, FL	ABC	W 30–20	81,876
November 1	3:30 p.m.	at Georgia Tech	No. 16	Bobby Dodd Stadium; Atlanta, GA	ABC	L 28–31	53,528
November 8	3:30 p.m.	Clemson	No. 24	Doak Campbell Stadium; Tallahassee, FL (rivalry)	ABC	W 41–27	77,013
November 15	8:00 p.m.	Boston College^{†}	No. 19	Doak Campbell Stadium; Tallahassee, FL	ABC	L 17–27	79,792
November 22	7:45 p.m.	at No. 22 Maryland		Byrd Stadium; College Park, MD	ESPN	W 37–3	51,620
November 29	3:30 p.m.	No. 2 Florida*	No. 24	Doak Campbell Stadium; Tallahassee, FL (rivalry)	ABC, ESPN2	L 15–45	83,237
December 27	4:30 p.m.	vs. Wisconsin*		Florida Citrus Bowl; Orlando, FL (Champs Sports Bowl)	ESPN	W 42–13	52,692
*Non-conference game; ^{†}Homecoming; Rankings from AP Poll released prior to the game; All times are in Eastern time

== Rankings ==
Ranking movements Legend: ██ Increase in ranking ██ Decrease in ranking — = Not ranked RV = Received votes
	Week																
Poll	Pre	1	2	3	4	5	6	7	8	9	10	11	12	13	14	15	Final
AP	—	—	—	24	—	—	—	—	24	16	24	20	—	23	—	—	21
Coaches	—	—	—	25	—	—	—	—	23	16	24	19	—	24	—	—	23
Harris	Not released				—	—	—	—	23	18	24	20	RV	23	—	—	Not released
BCS	Not released								25	15	22	19	—	20	24	—	Not released

== Game summaries ==
=== Western Carolina ===
	1	2	3	4	Total
Western Carolina	0	0	0	0	0
Florida State	7	21	27	14	69

The start of the game was delayed almost an hour and a half due to lightning in the area, and then almost another hour during the 1st quarter. The first player to touch the ball for FSU, to start the 2008 season, was Tony Carter who promptly returned a punt 68 yards for a touchdown and the game's first score. Sophomore Christian Ponder started his first game at quarterback. Ponder completed 11 of 17 passes for 196 yards and 3 touchdowns. At the start of the second drive in the second half (when FSU was up 35–0), sophomore D'Vontrey Richardson came into the game. Richardson went 5 for 6 through the air with one touchdown and also had two rushing touchdowns, one for over 50 yards. With several players serving suspensions due to the school wide "academic scandal" (several students and athletes were caught sharing answers in an online music class), the Seminoles had 28 freshman play in the game. Two of those freshman had touchdowns in the victory over the Catamounts.

=== Chattanooga ===
	1	2	3	4	Total
Tennessee-Ch	7	0	0	0	7
Florida State	21	9	9	7	46

In his second start as a collegiate athlete, Christian Ponder threw for 183 yards and three first-half touchdowns before being relieved by D'vontrey Richardson in the 3rd quarter. Richardson threw for 117 yards with one touchdown. Richardson also had a 55-yard rushing touchdown, the longest scoring run for a quarterback in the school's history. The previous record was held by Richardson himself, set in the previous week with a 52-yard touchdown run. Junior Wide Receiver, Corey Surrency, led Florida State in receiving with 87 yards and two touchdowns on just three receptions. Florida State's defense allowed their first score of the season after a 62-yard passing touchdown thrown by Chattanooga quarterback Tony Pastore. This was also the first score by Chattanooga against Florida State all-time, dating back to 1984, the only previous meeting between the two schools in which the Seminoles won in a shutout by 37 points.

=== Wake Forest ===
	1	2	3	4	Total
#18 Wake Forest	3	0	6	3	12
#25 Florida State	0	0	3	0	3

Defense, kicking game help No. 18 Wake Forest clip No. 24 (AP Poll) Florida State

=== Colorado ===
	1	2	3	4	Total
Colorado	7	0	0	14	21
Florida State	7	12	6	14	39

This game was played in Jacksonville, Florida, with Florida State as the home team. This was Bobby Bowden's 500th Career Game.

Bowden gets Florida State past Colorado in 500th game

=== At Miami (FL) ===
	1	2	3	4	Total
Florida State	7	17	10	7	41
Miami	0	3	19	17	39

FSU dumps Miami behind Smith's career-best four TDs

=== At NC State ===
	1	2	3	4	Total
Florida State	0	6	7	13	26
N.C. State	3	7	0	7	17

Florida State rides Ponder, Smith past N.C. State

=== Virginia Tech ===
	1	2	3	4	Total
Virginia Tech	10	3	0	7	20
#25 Florida State	0	10	14	6	30

Carr sets up two TDs in third quarter as No. 25 FSU rallies

=== At Georgia Tech ===
	1	2	3	4	Total
#15 Florida State	10	10	0	8	28
Georgia Tech	3	21	7	0	31

Georgia Tech snaps 0–12 skid against Florida State

=== Clemson ===
	1	2	3	4	Total
Clemson	10	7	3	7	27
#22 Florida State	10	10	7	14	41

FSU bowl eligible for 27th straight season on Bowden's birthday

=== Boston College ===
	1	2	3	4	Total
Boston College	14	0	10	3	27
#19 Florida State	0	10	0	7	17

One day prior to the game, Florida State suspended Wide Receivers Taiwan Easterling, Bert Reed, Corey Surrency, Cameron Wade and Richard Goodman for their roles in an on-campus altercation with members of the Phi Beta Sigma fraternity at Florida State's student union.

Boston College upends No. 19 Florida State day after five wideouts suspended

=== @ Maryland ===
	1	2	3	4	Total
Florida State	0	21	3	13	37
#25 Maryland	0	0	3	0	3

Myron Rolle, Florida State's starting safety, was interviewed in Birmingham, Alabama, at noon for the Rhodes Scholarship. At 5:00, he received the call that he was accepted. He flew in a private jet to Washington, D.C., and had a police escort take him to the game in College Park, Maryland. He arrived at the stadium around 8:30pm (with 11:55 left in the 2nd quarter). He dressed out in the locker room and walked onto the field to the roar of the Florida State visitor section with 6:23 left in the 2nd quarter. After stretching out, he made his game debut with 1:30 left in the 1st half. At the end of the game, his teammates showered him with a bucket of ice water in 26 degree weather, an act usually reserved for the head coach. He is the first Florida State player to ever have the "ice water shower".

Maryland picked apart by unranked Florida State

=== Florida ===
	1	2	3	4	Total
#4 Florida	14	14	10	7	45
#20 Florida State	3	6	6	0	15

Florida wins 8th straight while continuing dominance in intrastate rivalry

=== Vs. Wisconsin—Champs Sports Bowl ===
	1	2	3	4	Total
Wisconsin	0	3	3	7	13
Florida State	0	14	14	14	42

Ponder powers Seminoles' offense, defense routs Badgers

== Personnel ==
=== Recruits ===
College recruiting
Name	Hometown	School	Height	Weight	40^{‡}	Commit date
A.J. Alexander; ATH	Altoona, Pennsylvania	Altoona HS	6 ft 0 in (1.83 m)	180 lb (82 kg)	4.4	Jan 28, 2008
A.J. Alexander; ATH	Recruit ratings: Scout: Rivals: (78)					
Travis Arnold; DB	Madison, Florida	Madison HS	5 ft 10 in (1.78 m)	184 lb (83 kg)	4.6	Jul 20, 2007
Travis Arnold; DB	Recruit ratings: Scout: Rivals: (76)					
Nigel Bradham; LB	Crawfordville, Florida	Wakulla HS	6 ft 2 in (1.88 m)	230 lb (100 kg)	4.6	Apr 15, 2007
Nigel Bradham; LB	Recruit ratings: Scout: Rivals: (82)					
Nigel Carr; LB	Jacksonville, Florida	First Coast HS	6 ft 3 in (1.91 m)	220 lb (100 kg)	4.5	Apr 15, 2007
Nigel Carr; LB	Recruit ratings: Scout: Rivals: (82)					
Avis Commack; WR	Jacksonville, Florida	First Coast HS	6 ft 4 in (1.93 m)	182 lb (83 kg)	4.5	May 24, 2007
Avis Commack; WR	Recruit ratings: Scout: Rivals: (77)					
Andrew Datko; OL	Fort Lauderdale, Florida	St. Thomas Aquinas HS	6 ft 5 in (1.96 m)	285 lb (129 kg)	5.3	Oct 29, 2007
Andrew Datko; OL	Recruit ratings: Scout: Rivals: (77)					
Everett Dawkins; DE	Duncan, South Carolina	Byrnes HS	6 ft 2 in (1.88 m)	142 lb (64 kg)	4.7	Nov 17, 2007
Everett Dawkins; DE	Recruit ratings: Scout: Rivals: (79)					
Garrett Faircloth; OL	Jacksonville, Florida	Bolles HS	6 ft 6 in (1.98 m)	260 lb (120 kg)	N/A	Jan 24, 2008
Garrett Faircloth; OL	Recruit ratings: Scout: Rivals: (76)					
Jarmon Fortson; ATH	Columbus, Georgia	Carver HS	6 ft 3 in (1.91 m)	220 lb (100 kg)	4.6	Feb 6, 2008
Jarmon Fortson; ATH	Recruit ratings: Scout: Rivals: (79)					
Josh Gehres; WR	Tallahassee, Florida	Lincoln HS	6 ft 3 in (1.91 m)	190 lb (86 kg)	4.5	Jan 28, 2008
Josh Gehres; WR	Recruit ratings: Scout: Rivals: (73)					
Anthony Hill; DT	Pensacola, Florida	Pensacola HS	6 ft 4 in (1.93 m)	300 lb (140 kg)	4.9	Feb 16, 2007
Anthony Hill; DT	Recruit ratings: Scout: Rivals: (77)					
Ed Imeokparia; ATH	Blairstown, New Jersey	Blair Academy HS	6 ft 0 in (1.83 m)	188 lb (85 kg)	4.4	Feb 6, 2008
Ed Imeokparia; ATH	Recruit ratings: Scout: Rivals: (76)					
Carlton Jones; RB	Tampa, Florida	Middleton HS	5 ft 11 in (1.80 m)	215 lb (98 kg)	N/A	Feb 6, 2008
Carlton Jones; RB	Recruit ratings: Scout: Rivals: (40)					
Jabaris Little; TE	Tallahassee, Florida	Lincoln HS	6 ft 4 in (1.93 m)	240 lb (110 kg)	4.6	May 23, 2007
Jabaris Little; TE	Recruit ratings: Scout: Rivals: (75)					
Kyle Long; OL	Charlottesville, Virginia	St. Anne's-Belfield HS	6 ft 7 in (2.01 m)	280 lb (130 kg)	5.0	May 5, 2008
Kyle Long; OL	Recruit ratings: Scout: Rivals: (81)					
E.J. Manuel; QB	Virginia Beach, Virginia	Bayside HS	6 ft 5 in (1.96 m)	215 lb (98 kg)	4.6	Jun 27, 2007
E.J. Manuel; QB	Recruit ratings: Scout: Rivals: (82)					
Anthony McCloud; DT	Thomasville, Georgia	Thomas County Central HS	6 ft 3 in (1.91 m)	295 lb (134 kg)	N/A	Feb 6, 2008
Anthony McCloud; DT	Recruit ratings: Scout: Rivals: (40)					
Moses McCray; DT	Tampa, Florida	Hillsborough HS	6 ft 2 in (1.88 m)	268 lb (122 kg)	4.9	May 2, 2007
Moses McCray; DT	Recruit ratings: Scout: Rivals: (78)					
Nick Moody; LB	Philadelphia, Pennsylvania	Roman Catholic HS	6 ft 1 in (1.85 m)	218 lb (99 kg)	4.5	Apr 17, 2007
Nick Moody; LB	Recruit ratings: Scout: Rivals: (77)					
Terrance Parks; DB	Fairburn, Georgia	Creekside HS	6 ft 1 in (1.85 m)	200 lb (91 kg)	4.4	Jul 19, 2007
Terrance Parks; DB	Recruit ratings: Scout: Rivals: (83)					
Tavares Pressley; RB	Torrance, California	El Camino College	6 ft 1 in (1.85 m)	215 lb (98 kg)	4.4	Nov 27, 2007
Tavares Pressley; RB	Recruit ratings: Scout: Rivals: (N/A)					
Bo Reliford; TE	Ft. Lauderdale, Florida	Dillard HS	6 ft 6 in (1.98 m)	235 lb (107 kg)	4.8	May 30, 2008
Bo Reliford; TE	Recruit ratings: Scout: Rivals: (40)					
Zebrie Sanders; OL	Clayton, Ohio	Northmont HS	6 ft 5 in (1.96 m)	273 lb (124 kg)	5.3	Jan 20, 2008
Zebrie Sanders; OL	Recruit ratings: Scout: Rivals: (79)					
Rhonne Sanderson; OL	Tampa, Florida	Plant HS	6 ft 4 in (1.93 m)	280 lb (130 kg)	N/A	Jan 29, 2008
Rhonne Sanderson; OL	Recruit ratings: Scout: Rivals: (75)					
Debrale Smiley; RB	Thomasville, Georgia	Thomas County Central HS	6 ft 0 in (1.83 m)	235 lb (107 kg)	4.7	Feb 6, 2008
Debrale Smiley; RB	Recruit ratings: Scout: Rivals: (40)					
Blake Snider; OL	Heflin, AL	Cleburne County HS	6 ft 4 in (1.93 m)	282 lb (128 kg)	N/A	Feb 4, 2008
Blake Snider; OL	Recruit ratings: Scout: Rivals: (40)					
David Spurlock; OL	Murfreesboro, Tennessee	Riverdale HS	6 ft 4 in (1.93 m)	280 lb (130 kg)	N/A	Dec 9, 2007
David Spurlock; OL	Recruit ratings: Scout: Rivals: (78)					
Toshmon Stevens; DE	Crescent City, Florida	Crescent City HS	6 ft 5 in (1.96 m)	200 lb (91 kg)	4.6	Jul 31, 2007
Toshmon Stevens; DE	Recruit ratings: Scout: Rivals: (76)					
Corey Surrency; WR	Torrance, California	El Camino College	6 ft 5 in (1.96 m)	210 lb (95 kg)	4.5	Oct 21, 2007
Corey Surrency; WR	Recruit ratings: Scout: Rivals: (N/A)					
Jermaine Thomas; RB	Jacksonville, Florida	First Coast HS	6 ft 1 in (1.85 m)	190 lb (86 kg)	4.4	Apr 23, 2007
Jermaine Thomas; RB	Recruit ratings: Scout: Rivals: (83)					
Joe Tonga; OL	Walnut, California	Mt. San Antonio College	6 ft 6 in (1.98 m)	304 lb (138 kg)	5.4	Aug 4, 2008
Joe Tonga; OL	Recruit ratings: Scout: Rivals: (N/A)					
Markus White; DE	El Dorado, Kansas	Butler Community College	6 ft 4 in (1.93 m)	245 lb (111 kg)	4.5	Dec 10, 2007
Markus White; DE	Recruit ratings: Scout: Rivals: (N/A)					
Vincent Williams; LB	Davenport, Florida	Ridge HS	6 ft 1 in (1.85 m)	210 lb (95 kg)	4.8	Apr 18, 2007
Vincent Williams; LB	Recruit ratings: Scout: Rivals: (78)					
Overall recruit ranking:
‡ Refers to 40-yard dash; Note: In many cases, Scout, Rivals, 247Sports, On3, and ESPN may conflict in their listings of height, weight and 40 time.; In these cases, the average was taken. ESPN grades are on a 100-point scale.; Sources: "Florida State 2008 Football Commitments". Rivals.; "2008 Florida State Commits". Scout.; "2008 Player Commitments – Florida State". ESPN.; "Scout.com Team Recruiting Rankings". Scout.; "2008 Team Ranking". Rivals.com.

== Statistics ==
=== Team ===
	Team	Opp
Scoring	157	40
Points per game	39.25	10
First downs	24	12
Rushing	11	3
Passing	12	6
Penalty	1	3
Total offense	561	176
Avg per play	9.8	3.0
Avg per game	561	176
Fumbles-Lost	2–0	3–1
Penalties-Yards	8–58	6–37
Avg per game	58	37

	Team	Opp
Punts-Yards	2–93	8–272
Avg per punt	46.5	34
Time of possession/Game	27:44	32:16
3rd down conversions	3	3
4th down conversions	0	0
Touchdowns scored	10	0
Field goals-Attempts-Long	0–1–0	0–1–0
PAT-Attempts	9–10	0–0
Attendance	73024	0
Games/Avg per Game	1/73024	0/0

==== Scores by quarter ====
	1	2	3	4	Total
Florida State	62	95	83	83	323
Opponents	43	41	35	55	174
