= Geno Hayes =

American football player (1987–2021)

- Hayes with the Tampa Bay Buccaneers

No. 54, 58, 55
- Position: Linebacker

Personal information
- Born: August 10, 1987; Miami, Florida, U.S.
- Died: April 26, 2021 (aged 33); Valdosta, Georgia, U.S.
- Listed height: 6 ft 1 in (1.85 m)
- Listed weight: 226 lb (103 kg)

Career information
- High school: Madison County (FL)
- College: Florida State
- NFL draft: 2008: 6th round, 175th overall pick

Career history
- Tampa Bay Buccaneers (2008–2011); Chicago Bears (2012); Jacksonville Jaguars (2013–2014)

Awards and highlights
- First-team All-ACC (2007)

Career NFL statistics
- Total tackles: 401
- Sacks: 10
- Forced fumbles: 6
- Fumble recoveries: 1
- Interceptions: 6
- Defensive touchdowns: 1
- Stats at Pro Football Reference

Eugene Antonio Hayes (August 10, 1987 – April 26, 2021) was an American professional football player who was a linebacker in the National Football League (NFL). After playing college football for the Florida State Seminoles, he was selected by the Tampa Bay Buccaneers in the sixth round of the 2008 NFL draft. He also played for the Chicago Bears and Jacksonville Jaguars in the NFL.

== Early life ==
A native of Greenville, Florida, Hayes attended Madison County High School, where he played football and ran track. As a junior in 2003, he posted 130 tackles, 20 tackles for a loss, 19 sacks and three interceptions. Madison County finished as the Class 2A state runner up to Chaminade-Madonna College Preparatory School that year. In his senior year, he added 124 stops with 27 for loss and 11 sacks. Madison County again finished as the Class 2A state runner up when they were upset 17–15 by Immokalee High School. Hayes earned All-America first-team honors from Parade Magazine, and second-team USA Today All-America honors. He also starred in track & field, competing in the 110 hurdles and 300 hurdles.

Hayes was listed as a four-star recruit by Rivals.com, and ranked as the No. 3 outside linebacker prospect of his class, behind only Tray Blackmon and Ryan Reynolds. Recruited by dozens of schools, Hayes took official visits to Georgia, Tennessee, Clemson, and Florida State. He committed to FSU on February 2, 2005, and was the seventh-highest graded recruit of the Seminoles' 2005 recruiting class, and the second-highest linebacker behind Derek Nicholson.

== College career ==
In his true freshman season, Hayes played in all 13 games and was credited with 17 tackles, broke up one pass and had two quarterback hurries. While he played mostly on special teams, Hayes also saw time as a back-up for A. J. Nicholson at weakside linebacker. In a game at Clemson in November 2005, Hayes recorded a season-high three tackles and scored Florida State's only touchdown of the game, recovering a blocked punt in the endzone. He also had three tackles in the Orange Bowl loss to Penn State.

With the graduation of Nicholson in 2006, Hayes replaced him at the weakside linebacker position, starting 10 of Florida State's 13 games. He only missed three games (Maryland, Boston College, Virginia) because of a knee injury suffered in the Seminoles' victory over Duke. He ranked fifth on the team in tackles with a career-high 59 stops despite missing three full games and most of the game against Duke when he suffered two sprained ligaments in his right knee while making a tackle in the first quarter. He also ranked third on the team with a career-high 12.0 tackles for minus yardage, behind Lawrence Timmons (18.0) and Everette Brown (13.5). In the Seminoles' Emerald Bowl win against UCLA, Hayes had a career-high of 12 tackles.

In his junior year, Hayes took over a leadership role in the Seminoles linebacker corps, after the graduation of Timmons and Buster Davis. Starting a weakside linebacker, he ranked second on the team in tackles (80) behind Derek Nicholson (99), first in tackles-for-loss (17.5), and second in quarterback sacks (5.0) behind Everette Brown (6.5). He was a first-team All-Atlantic Coast Conference pick.

== Professional career ==
Described as a “smallish, athletic linebacker who makes plays all over the field,” Hayes was projected to be a fourth-round draft pick by Sports Illustrated. He was drafted in the sixth round (175th overall) in 2008.

Pre-draft measurables
Height	Weight	40-yard dash	10-yard split	20-yard split	20-yard shuttle	Three-cone drill	Vertical jump	Broad jump	Bench press
6 ft + 3/4 in (1.85 m)	226 lb (103 kg)	4.64 s	1.56 s	2.68 s	4.48 s	7.22 s	26 1/2 in (0.67 m)	9 ft 8 in (2.95 m)	22 reps
All values from NFL Combine

=== Tampa Bay Buccaneers ===
In his rookie year, Hayes appeared in nine games, mostly on special teams. In 2009, he started at weakside linebacker, replacing Derrick Brooks.

=== Chicago Bears ===
Hayes signed with the Chicago Bears to a one-year deal on April 19, 2012.

=== Jacksonville Jaguars ===
Hayes signed a two-year, $2 million contract with the Jacksonville Jaguars on March 13, 2013.

== NFL career statistics ==
Legend
**Bold**	Career high

Year	Team	Games		Tackles					Interceptions					Fumbles			
Year	Team	GP	GS	Cmb	Solo	Ast	Sck	TFL	Int	Yds	TD	Lng	PD	FF	FR	Yds	TD
2008	TAM	9	0	13	10	3	0.0	0	0	0	0	0	1	0	0	0	0
2009	TAM	15	13	**98**	**80**	18	3.0	15	**2**	21	0	20	**6**	1	**1**	0	0
2010	TAM	16	16	82	72	10	**4.0**	**16**	1	**41**	**1**	**41**	**6**	1	0	0	0
2011	TAM	16	13	64	45	**19**	0.0	5	1	8	0	8	2	**2**	0	0	0
2012	CHI	15	3	16	14	2	0.0	1	0	0	0	0	2	0	0	0	0
2013	JAX	14	14	77	58	**19**	1.0	2	**2**	39	0	28	4	1	0	0	0
2014	JAX	16	11	51	34	17	2.0	9	0	0	0	0	0	1	0	0	0
Total		101	70	401	313	88	10.0	48	6	109	1	41	21	6	1	0	0

== Personal life and death ==
On April 22, 2021, Hayes entered hospice care at his parents' home due to chronic liver disease with which he had been diagnosed two years earlier. He died at age 33 on April 26, 2021. Hayes is survived by his wife Shevelle, his son Gemarri, and his daughter Skyler. He was buried in Evergreen Cemetery in Greenville.
