= 2006 Virginia Tech Hokies football team =

American college football season

2006 Virginia Tech Hokies football
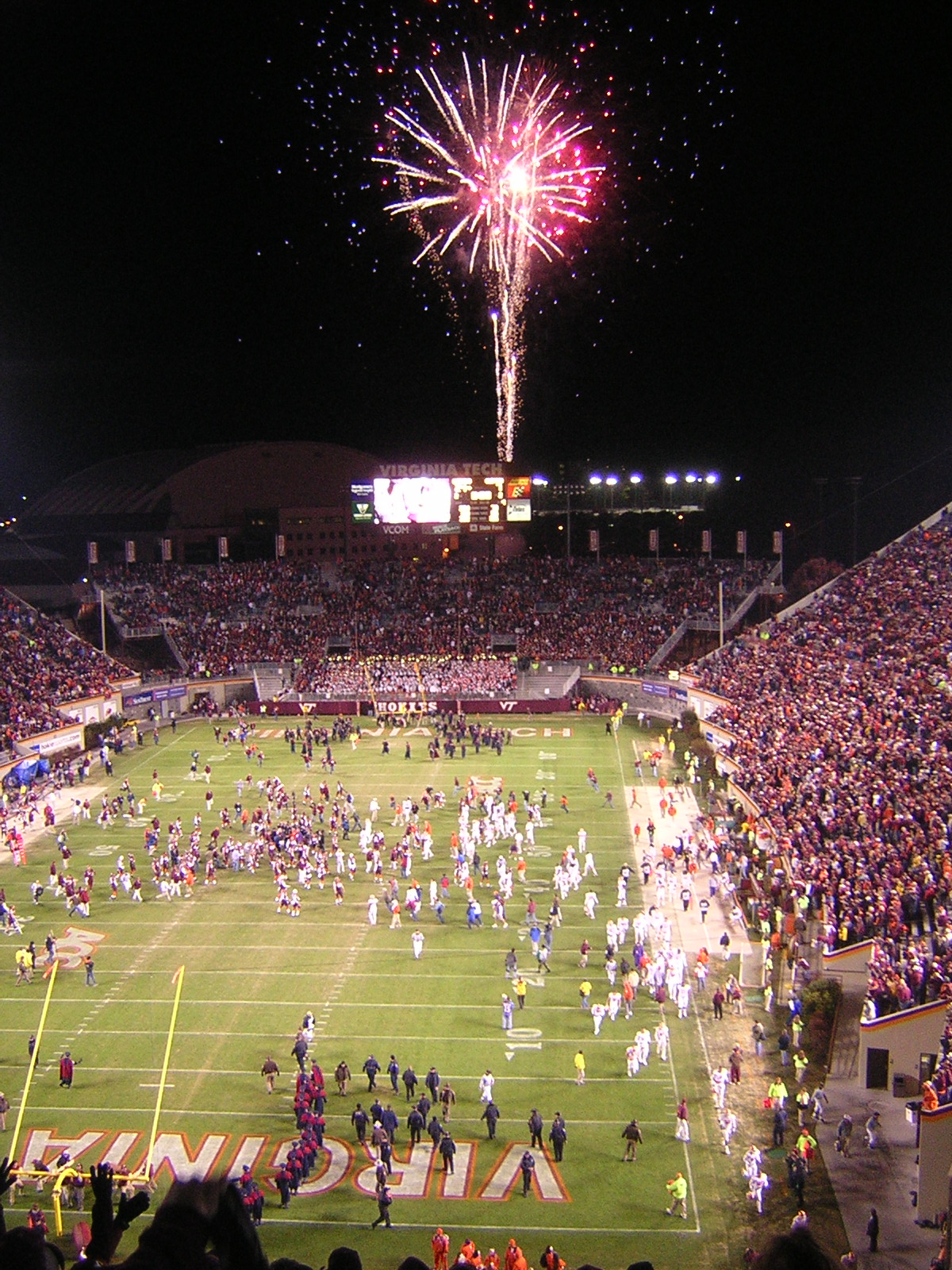

Chick-fil-A Bowl, L 24–31 vs. Georgia
- Conference: Atlantic Coast Conference
- Coastal Division

Ranking
- Coaches: No. 18
- AP: No. 19
- Record: 10–3 (6–2 ACC)
- Head coach: Frank Beamer (20th season)
- Offensive coordinator: Bryan Stinespring (5th season)
- Offensive scheme: Pro-style
- Defensive coordinator: Bud Foster (12th season)
- Base defense: 4–4
- Home stadium: Lane Stadium

2006 Atlantic Coast Conference football standings
	Conf.			Overall
Team	W		L	W		L
Atlantic Division
No. 18 Wake Forest x$	6	–	2	11	–	3
No. 20 Boston College	5	–	3	10	–	3
Maryland	5	–	3	9	–	4
Clemson	5	–	3	8	–	5
Florida State	3	–	5	7	–	6
NC State	2	–	6	3	–	9
Coastal Division
Georgia Tech x	7	–	1	9	–	5
No. 19 Virginia Tech	6	–	2	10	–	3
Virginia	4	–	4	5	–	7
Miami (FL)	3	–	5	7	–	6
North Carolina	2	–	6	3	–	9
Duke	0	–	8	0	–	12
Championship: Wake Forest 9, Georgia Tech 6
$ – BCS representative as conference champion; x – Division champion/co-champions; Rankings from AP Poll

The 2006 Virginia Tech Hokies football team represented Virginia Polytechnic Institute and State University during the 2006 NCAA Division I FBS football season. The team's head coach was Frank Beamer. The team tallied a 10–3 record, going 10–2 during the regular season before losing 31–24 in the 2006 Chick-fil-A Bowl against the Georgia Bulldogs.

Virginia Tech opened the season ranked No. 17 and posted three consecutive wins over Northeastern, North Carolina, and Duke, outscoring opponents 109–10 and recording two shutouts. Sophomore quarterback Sean Glennon made his debut as the starter, while running back Branden Ore emerged as the offensive centerpiece, rushing for 1,090 yards and 16 touchdowns on the season.

After climbing to No. 11 in the national rankings, the Hokies suffered back-to-back losses to Georgia Tech and Boston College. The 38–27 defeat to Georgia Tech exposed defensive vulnerabilities, while a 22–3 Thursday night loss at Chestnut Hill marked the team’s lowest offensive output of the year. Virginia Tech rebounded with a 36–6 win over Southern Miss and a pivotal 24–7 victory over No. 10 Clemson, where the defense forced four turnovers and special teams contributed a blocked punt.

The Hokies closed the regular season with five straight wins, including a 17–10 road victory over Miami and shutouts of Kent State and Virginia. The defense, anchored by linebackers Vince Hall and Xavier Adibi, finished first nationally in scoring defense, allowing just 11.0 points per game. Hall was dismissed from the team during the season but later returned for spring practice in 2007, though he did not appear on the fall roster. Ore missed portions of the Wake Forest game due to injury but returned for the final stretch.

Virginia Tech earned a bid to the Chick-fil-A Bowl against No. 12 Georgia. Despite leading 21–3 early in the third quarter, the Hokies surrendered 28 unanswered points and fell 31–24. Glennon threw three interceptions, and Georgia capitalized on short fields and a blocked punt to complete the comeback.

The Hokies finished the season ranked No. 19 in the AP Poll and No. 18 in the Coaches Poll. Beamer’s squad posted its fourth straight 10-win season and laid the foundation for a top-five finish the following year.

== Preseason ==
Virginia Tech began the season ranked #16 in the USA Today Coaches Poll and #17 in the Associated Press Poll after going 11–2 (7–1 ACC) in 2005 and winning the Coastal division of the Atlantic Coast Conference.

See also 2006 NCAA Division I-A football rankings

== Schedule ==
Date	Time	Opponent	Rank	Site	TV	Result	Attendance
September 2	1:30 p.m.	Northeastern*	No. 17	Lane Stadium; Blacksburg, VA	ESPN360	W 38–0	66,233
September 9	12:00 p.m.	at North Carolina	No. 16	Kenan Memorial Stadium; Chapel Hill, NC	ESPN	W 35–10	57,000
September 16	12:00 p.m.	Duke	No. 14	Lane Stadium; Blacksburg, VA	Raycom/LFS	W 36–0	66,233
September 23	12:00 p.m.	Cincinnati*	No. 11	Lane Stadium; Blacksburg, VA	ESPNU	W 29–13	66,233
September 30	3:30 p.m.	No. 24 Georgia Tech	No. 11	Lane Stadium; Blacksburg, VA (Battle of the Techs)	ABC	L 27–38	66,233
October 12	7:30 p.m.	at Boston College	No. 22	Alumni Stadium; Chestnut Hill, MA (rivalry)	ESPN	L 3–22	44,500
October 21	7:00 p.m.	Southern Miss*^{†}		Lane Stadium; Blacksburg, VA	ESPNU	W 36–6	66,233
October 26	7:30 p.m.	No. 10 Clemson		Lane Stadium; Blacksburg, VA	ESPN	W 24–7	66,233
November 4	8:00 p.m.	at Miami (FL)	No. 23	Miami Orange Bowl; Miami, Florida (rivalry)	ABC	W 17–10	41,504
November 11	3:30 p.m.	Kent State*	No. 20	Lane Stadium; Blacksburg, VA	ESPNU	W 23–0	66,233
November 18	7:00 p.m.	at No. 14 Wake Forest	No. 19	Groves Stadium; Winston-Salem, NC	ESPN2	W 27–6	36,723
November 25	12:00 p.m.	Virginia	No. 17	Lane Stadium; Blacksburg, VA (Commonwealth Cup)	Raycom/LFS	W 17–0	66,233
December 30	8:00 p.m.	vs. Georgia*	No. 14	Georgia Dome; Atlanta, GA (Chick-fil-A Bowl)	ESPN	L 24–31	75,406
*Non-conference game; ^{†}Homecoming; Rankings from AP Poll released prior to the game; All times are in Eastern time

== Game summaries ==
=== Northeastern ===
Team	1	2	3	4	Total
Northeastern	0	0	0	0	0
• Virginia Tech	21	7	7	3	38

- Date: September 2
- Location: Lane Stadium, Blacksburg, VA
- Game start: 1:35 p.m. EST
- Elapsed time: 3:00
- Game attendance: 66,233
- Game weather: 70 °F (21 °C), Partly Cloudy, Winds NNW 10 mph (16 km/h)
- Referee: Jerry Magallanes
- TV announcers (ESPN360): Ryan Rose & Stan Lewter

Official Box Score

Seventeenth-ranked Virginia Tech opened the 2006 season with a 38–0 shutout of Division I-AA Northeastern at Lane Stadium, dominating all phases and never allowing the Huskies inside the Hokies’ 30-yard line. Virginia Tech scored on its first three possessions and outgained Northeastern 481 to 182, while the defense forced three turnovers and recorded five sacks.

Sean Glennon, making his first career start, completed 15 of 18 passes for 222 yards and a 54-yard touchdown to David Clowney in the second quarter. Branden Ore rushed for 54 yards and two touchdowns, scoring from 1 and 3 yards out. George Bell added a 1-yard touchdown run in the third quarter, and backup quarterback Cory Holt capped the scoring with a 1-yard sneak in the fourth. Brandon Pace contributed a 32-yard field goal late in the first half.

Clowney led all receivers with six catches for 117 yards and a score, while Josh Morgan added 58 yards on four receptions. Defensively, Vince Hall recorded eight tackles and two quarterback hurries, and Chris Ellis added a sack and a forced fumble. The Hokies held Northeastern to 2-of-13 on third down and just 35 rushing yards, posting their first shutout since blanking Duke the previous season.

=== North Carolina ===
Team	1	2	3	4	Total
North Carolina	3	0	0	7	10
• Virginia Tech	7	7	7	14	35

- Date: September 9
- Location: Kenan Memorial Stadium, Chapel Hill, NC
- Game start: 12:00 p.m. EST
- Elapsed time: 3:10
- Game attendance: 60,000
- Game weather: 78 °F (26 °C), Sunny, Winds W 5 mph (8.0 km/h)
- Referee: Jim Hyson
- TV announcers (ESPN360): Bob Wischusen & Rod Gilmore

Virginia Tech, ranked No. 16 nationally, improved to 2–0 with a 35–10 victory over North Carolina. The Hokies scored touchdowns in all four quarters and held the Tar Heels to just 189 total yards, including 66 rushing.

Branden Ore led the offense with 27 carries for 111 yards and three touchdowns, scoring from 1, 4, and 3 yards out. Brandon Flowers added a 69-yard interception return for a touchdown in the third quarter, and redshirt freshman quarterback Ike Whitaker threw a 41-yard touchdown pass to Justin Harper late in the fourth.

Starting quarterback Sean Glennon completed 10 of 17 passes for 66 yards. Harper led all receivers with 61 yards on two catches. The Hokies outgained UNC 283–189 and held a 34:38 to 25:22 edge in time of possession.

Defensively, Xavier Adibi recorded nine tackles and a sack, while Vince Hall added seven stops. Virginia Tech forced three turnovers, registered four sacks, and held North Carolina to 2-of-13 on third down.

=== Duke ===
Team	1	2	3	4	Total
Duke	0	0	0	0	0
• Virginia Tech	13	10	7	6	36

- Date: September 16
- Location: Lane Stadium, Blacksburg, VA
- Game start: 12:00 p.m. EST
- Elapsed time: 3:05
- Game attendance: 66,233
- Game weather: 72 °F (22 °C), Sunny, Winds N 7 mph (11 km/h)
- Referee: Jerry Magallanes
- TV announcers (ESPN360): Dave LaMont & Terry Bowden

Virginia Tech, ranked No. 14 nationally, delivered a comprehensive 36–0 victory over Duke in Blacksburg, showcasing a dominant defense and opportunistic special teams that overwhelmed the Blue Devils from the outset.

Branden Ore led the Hokies’ ground attack with a 1-yard touchdown run in the first quarter, while Eddie Royal electrified the crowd with a 58-yard punt return for a score less than a minute later. Sean Glennon threw touchdown passes of 17 yards to Sam Wheeler and 25 yards to Josh Morgan, finishing the day with 132 passing yards and two scores on 14 completions. Kenny Lewis Jr. added a 2-yard touchdown run in the fourth quarter, and Brandon Pace contributed a 42-yard field goal to round out the scoring.

Duke failed to mount any sustained offensive threat, managing just 139 total yards and converting only one of 14 third-down attempts. Virginia Tech’s defense recorded four sacks and forced two turnovers, including a 72-yard interception return for a touchdown by Victor Harris late in the game. Xavier Adibi led the team with seven tackles, while Chris Ellis and Carlton Powell each registered a sack.

The Hokies controlled field position throughout, aided by Royal’s special teams play and a blocked punt that resulted in a safety. The shutout marked Virginia Tech’s second consecutive blanking of Duke and extended its early-season dominance, having outscored opponents 144–10 through three games.

=== Cincinnati ===
Team	1	2	3	4	Total
Cincinnati	0	10	3	0	13
• Virginia Tech	5	0	7	17	29

- Date: September 23
- Location: Lane Stadium, Blacksburg, VA
- Game start: 12:00 p.m. EST
- Elapsed time: 3:15
- Game attendance: 66,233
- Game weather: 75 °F (24 °C), Partly Cloudy, Winds W 6 mph (9.7 km/h)
- Referee: Tommy Bell
- TV announcers (ESPN360): Dave LaMont & Terry Bowden

Virginia Tech overcame a sluggish first half to defeat Cincinnati 29–13 in Blacksburg, improving to 4–0 behind a second-half surge led by Branden Ore and a resilient defense.

Trailing 10–5 at halftime, the Hokies erupted for 24 unanswered points after the break. Ore rushed for 170 yards on 26 carries and scored on a 1-yard run in the fourth quarter. Sean Glennon threw for 188 yards and connected with Justin Harper for a 51-yard touchdown that gave Virginia Tech its first lead. Brandon Pace added three field goals, including a 39-yarder in the third quarter, and Victor Harris sealed the win with a 72-yard interception return for a touchdown.

Cincinnati’s scoring came on a 33-yard field goal and a 1-yard touchdown run by Greg Moore, both in the second quarter. The Bearcats were limited to 294 total yards and committed two turnovers. Virginia Tech’s defense, led by Vince Hall with 10 tackles and Xavier Adibi with a sack, held Cincinnati to 3-of-13 on third down and just 121 rushing yards.

The Hokies outgained the Bearcats 400 to 294 and controlled the clock in the second half, extending their unbeaten start and setting up a ranked showdown with Georgia Tech.

=== Georgia Tech ===
Team	1	2	3	4	Total
• Georgia Tech	21	3	14	0	38
Virginia Tech	7	6	0	14	27

- Date: September 30
- Location: Lane Stadium, Blacksburg, VA
- Game start: 3:30 p.m. EST
- Elapsed time: 3:20
- Game attendance: 66,233
- Game weather: 73 °F (23 °C), Mostly Sunny, Winds SW 8 mph (13 km/h)
- Referee: Jim Hyson
- TV announcers (ABC): Brad Nessler & Bob Griese

Virginia Tech, ranked No. 11, suffered its first loss of the season in a 38–27 defeat to No. 24 Georgia Tech, as the Yellow Jackets capitalized on early turnovers and explosive plays to seize control in Blacksburg.

Calvin Johnson caught touchdown passes of 35 and 53 yards in the first quarter, helping Georgia Tech build a 21–7 lead. Reggie Ball threw for 153 yards and two scores, while Tashard Choice added 104 rushing yards and a touchdown. The Yellow Jackets extended their lead to 38–13 in the third quarter after recovering two Virginia Tech fumbles deep in Hokie territory.

Branden Ore rushed for 75 yards and a touchdown, and Sean Glennon threw for 339 yards with two scores, including a 36-yard pass to Eddie Royal and a 25-yard strike to Josh Morgan. Glennon also committed three turnovers, including two interceptions and a fumble that led directly to Georgia Tech points.

Virginia Tech’s defense struggled to contain Johnson and failed to generate a turnover. Vince Hall led the team with 11 tackles, while Chris Ellis recorded a sack. Despite a late rally, the Hokies were unable to overcome the early deficit and dropped to 4–1 on the season.

=== Boston College ===
Team	1	2	3	4	Total
Virginia Tech	0	3	0	0	3
• Boston College	0	7	6	9	22

- Date: October 12
- Location: Alumni Stadium, Chestnut Hill, MA
- Game start: 7:30 p.m. EST
- Elapsed time: 3:10
- Game attendance: 44,500
- Game weather: 58 °F (14 °C), Overcast, Winds NE 6 mph (9.7 km/h)
- Referee: Jack Childress
- TV announcers (ESPN): Chris Fowler & Kirk Herbstreit

No. 22 Virginia Tech suffered its second consecutive defeat in a 22–3 loss to No. 23 Boston College, undone by turnovers, penalties, and a stagnant offense on a Thursday night in Chestnut Hill. The Hokies committed four turnovers and were flagged 12 times, repeatedly stalling drives and giving Boston College short fields. Virginia Tech’s only points came on a 36-yard field goal by Brandon Pace in the second quarter, but the offense failed to reach the red zone again.

Boston College capitalized on Tech’s miscues with a 2-yard touchdown run by L.V. Whitworth, a 2-yard touchdown pass from Matt Ryan to Kevin Challenger, two field goals from Tony Gonzalez, and a fourth-quarter safety. The Eagles controlled possession and tempo, converting 9-of-18 third downs and outgaining the Hokies 318 to 181.

Sean Glennon completed 16-of-32 passes for 148 yards and two interceptions. Branden Ore led the Hokies in rushing with 71 yards on 20 carries, while Josh Morgan was the top receiver with 5 catches for 55 yards. On defense, Vince Hall recorded 13 tackles and Xavier Adibi added 10, but the unit was unable to overcome the field position disadvantages and extended time on the field.

=== Southern Miss ===
Team	1	2	3	4	Total
Southern Miss	3	3	0	0	6
• Virginia Tech	7	15	7	7	36

- Date: October 21
- Location: Lane Stadium, Blacksburg, VA
- Game start: 7:00 p.m. EST
- Elapsed time: 3:05
- Game attendance: 66,233
- Game weather: 61 °F (16 °C), Partly Cloudy, Winds W 6 mph (9.7 km/h)
- Referee: Tommy Bell
- TV announcers (ESPNU): Dave Armstrong & Mike Golic

Virginia Tech, ranked No. 24, snapped a two-game losing streak with a 36–6 victory over Southern Miss on Homecoming night in Blacksburg. The Hokies dominated the line of scrimmage, rushing for 284 yards and sacking Golden Eagles quarterback Jeremy Young six times.

Branden Ore led the offense with a career-high 207 rushing yards on 23 carries, including touchdown runs of 2 and 70 yards. Sean Glennon completed 4 of 11 passes for 100 yards and a 38-yard touchdown to Josh Morgan, while backup Ike Whitaker added 14 passing yards and a rushing score. Kenny Lewis Jr. contributed a 14-yard touchdown run in the fourth quarter.

Southern Miss managed two field goals from Darren McCaleb in the first quarter but failed to score again. Virginia Tech responded with 36 unanswered points, including a safety in the second quarter and three Brandon Pace field goals (22, 32, and 27 yards).

Defensively, the Hokies held Southern Miss to 216 total yards and just 2.2 yards per carry. Vince Hall led the team with 12 tackles and a sack, while Barry Booker and Carlton Powell each added sacks and tackles for loss. Virginia Tech forced two fumbles and recorded nine quarterback hurries.

The win improved Virginia Tech’s record to 5–2.

=== Clemson ===
Team	1	2	3	4	Total
Clemson	7	0	0	0	7
• Virginia Tech	7	3	14	0	24

- Date: October 26
- Location: Lane Stadium, Blacksburg, VA
- Game start: 7:30 p.m. EST
- Elapsed time: 3:15
- Game attendance: 66,233
- Game weather: 52 °F (11 °C), Clear, Winds NW 5 mph (8.0 km/h)
- Referee: Steve Usechek
- TV announcers (ESPN): Rece Davis & Lou Holtz

Virginia Tech delivered one of its most complete performances of the season in a 24–7 upset of No. 10 Clemson, dominating the second half and stifling the Tigers’ high-powered rushing attack. The Hokies scored 17 unanswered points in the third quarter, including touchdown runs of 11 and 3 yards by Branden Ore and a 32-yard field goal by Brandon Pace.

Clemson’s lone score came in the first quarter on a 6-yard touchdown run by James Davis. The Tigers entered the game averaging over 200 rushing yards per contest but were held to just 71 yards on the ground. Virginia Tech’s defense forced two turnovers and recorded three sacks, controlling the line of scrimmage throughout.

Sean Glennon completed 10-of-18 passes for 137 yards. Ore led all rushers with 203 yards and two touchdowns on 20 carries, while Eddie Royal paced the receivers with 4 catches for 56 yards. On defense, Vince Hall recorded 13 tackles and a sack, Xavier Adibi added 10 tackles, and Brandon Flowers contributed an interception and a forced fumble.

=== Miami ===
Team	1	2	3	4	Total
• Virginia Tech	0	10	0	7	17
Miami	0	0	3	7	10

- Date: November 4
- Location: Miami Orange Bowl, Miami, FL
- Game start: 8:00 p.m. EST
- Elapsed time: 3:10
- Game attendance: 60,435
- Game weather: 75 °F (24 °C), Clear, Winds E 7 mph (11 km/h)
- Referee: Jim Knight
- TV announcers (ESPN): Ron Franklin & Ed Cunningham

No. 23 Virginia Tech earned a hard-fought 17–10 road win over Miami in a defensive battle at the Orange Bowl. The Hokies took a 10–0 lead into halftime after a 32-yard field goal by Brandon Pace and a 2-yard touchdown run by Branden Ore in the second quarter.

Miami responded with a 55-yard field goal by Jon Peattie in the third quarter and tied the game early in the fourth on a 50-yard touchdown run by Javarris James. Virginia Tech answered with a five-play, 26-yard drive capped by an 8-yard touchdown run from Ore with 1:39 remaining that proved to be the game winner.

Ore finished with 79 rushing yards and two touchdowns on 23 carries. Sean Glennon completed 9-of-16 passes for 127 yards, while Eddie Royal led the receivers with 3 catches for 58 yards. The Hokies’ defense held Miami to 264 total yards and forced one turnover, with Vince Hall and Xavier Adibi combining for 21 tackles.

=== Kent State ===
Team	1	2	3	4	Total
Kent State	0	0	0	0	0
• Virginia Tech	3	3	7	10	23

- Date: November 11
- Location: Lane Stadium, Blacksburg, VA
- Game start: 1:30 p.m. EST
- Elapsed time: 3:00
- Game attendance: 66,233
- Game weather: 48 °F (9 °C), Mostly Sunny, Winds NW 10 mph (16 km/h)
- Referee: Jack Childress
- TV announcers (ESPNU): Dave Armstrong & Mike Golic

No. 20 Virginia Tech posted its third shutout of the season with a 23–0 win over Kent State, overcoming offensive inconsistency with a dominant defensive effort and key special teams plays. The Hokies scored in every quarter and held the Golden Flashes to 182 total yards.

Branden Ore led the Hokies with 72 rushing yards and a touchdown on 25 carries. Sean Glennon completed 13-of-21 passes for 140 yards, with David Clowney leading the receivers with 3 catches for 46 yards. Brandon Pace converted three field goals from 34, 37, and 24 yards, and Noland Burchette returned a fumble 15 yards for a touchdown in the fourth quarter.

Kent State quarterback Julian Edelman was held to 58 passing yards and 43 rushing yards. Eugene Jarvis added 41 yards on the ground. The Hokies’ defense, led by Vince Hall’s 10 tackles and Chris Ellis’s two sacks, forced two turnovers and recorded five tackles for loss.

=== Wake Forest ===
Team	1	2	3	4	Total
• No. 19 Virginia Tech	7	13	7	7	34
No. 14 Wake Forest	0	0	0	6	6

- Date: November 18
- Location: Groves Stadium, Winston-Salem, NC
- Game start: 7:00 p.m. EST
- Elapsed time: 3:05
- Game attendance: 37,217
- Game weather: 58 °F (14 °C), Clear, Winds W 4 mph (6.4 km/h)
- Referee: Jim Hyson
- TV announcers (ESPN2): Ron Franklin & Ed Cunningham

Virginia Tech silenced No. 14 Wake Forest with a 34–6 road win, dominating from start to finish and handing the Demon Deacons their worst loss of the season. The Hokies scored on their opening drive and never trailed, building a 20–0 halftime lead behind Branden Ore’s 1-yard touchdown run and two field goals from Brandon Pace.

Sean Glennon threw for 132 yards and two touchdowns, including a 49-yard strike to Josh Morgan in the third quarter. Ore added a second touchdown in the fourth, finishing with 71 rushing yards on 17 carries. Virginia Tech’s defense held Wake Forest to 257 total yards and forced two turnovers.

Vince Hall led the Hokies with 13 tackles and a sack, while Xavier Adibi added 10 tackles and a fumble recovery.

=== Virginia ===
Team	1	2	3	4	Total
Virginia	0	0	0	0	0
• No. 17 Virginia Tech	7	10	3	7	27

- Date: November 25
- Location: Lane Stadium, Blacksburg, VA
- Game start: 12:00 p.m. EST
- Elapsed time: 2:55
- Game attendance: 66,233
- Game weather: 42 °F (6 °C), Overcast, Winds NE 6 mph (9.7 km/h)
- Referee: Tommy Bell
- TV announcers (ESPN): Dave Pasch & Rod Gilmore

Closing out the regular season, No. 17 Virginia Tech shut out in-state rival Virginia 17–0, earning its fourth straight win and third shutout of the year. The Hokies scored on their opening possession with a 1-yard touchdown run by Branden Ore and added a 39-yard field goal from Brandon Pace in the second quarter.

Sean Glennon completed 13-of-18 passes for 154 yards and a touchdown to Justin Harper. Ore rushed for 115 yards and a score on 25 carries, while Harper led the receivers with 4 catches for 63 yards. The Hokies outgained Virginia 333 to 181 and held the Cavaliers to just 26 rushing yards.

Defensively, Vince Hall recorded 11 tackles and Xavier Adibi added 9. Virginia Tech forced two turnovers and held Virginia to 2-of-13 on third down conversions.

=== Georgia ===
Team	1	2	3	4	Total
No. 12 Virginia Tech	7	14	0	0	21
• No. 15 Georgia	0	3	18	7	28

- Date: January 1
- Location: Jacksonville Municipal Stadium, Jacksonville, FL
- Game start: 1:00 p.m. EST
- Elapsed time: 3:20
- Game attendance: 77,248
- Game weather: 66 °F (19 °C), Partly Cloudy, Winds SW 9 mph (14 km/h)
- Referee: Steve Usechek
- TV announcers (ABC): Mike Patrick & Todd Blackledge

In the 2006 Chick-fil-A Bowl, No. 12 Virginia Tech fell to No. 15 Georgia 31–24 after surrendering 28 unanswered points in the second half. The Hokies led 21–3 at halftime behind two touchdown passes from Sean Glennon and a 53-yard punt return score by Eddie Royal.

Georgia mounted a comeback in the third quarter with a 2-yard touchdown run by Kregg Lumpkin, a safety, and a 28-yard touchdown pass from Matthew Stafford to Martrez Milner. Glennon threw three second-half interceptions, including one returned for a touchdown by Tony Taylor.

Glennon finished 13-of-26 for 94 yards, two touchdowns, and three interceptions. Ore rushed for 42 yards on 15 carries, while Royal led the receivers with 4 catches for 36 yards and a punt return touchdown. Vince Hall recorded 10 tackles and Xavier Adibi added 8.

== Rankings ==
Ranking movements Legend: ██ Increase in ranking ██ Decrease in ranking — = Not ranked RV = Received votes
	Week															
Poll	Pre	1	2	3	4	5	6	7	8	9	10	11	12	13	14	Final
AP	17	16	14	11	11	21	22	RV	RV	23	20	19	17	14	14	19
Coaches	16	14	14	10	10	18	17	RV	RV	24	21	19	17	14	14	18
Harris	Not released				11	19	18	—	—	24	21	19	17	14	15	Not released
BCS	Not released							—	—	25	21	21	17	14	15	Not released

== Personnel ==
=== Coaching staff ===
Position	Name	First year at VT	First year in current position
Head coach	Frank Beamer	1987	1987
Associate head coach and running backs coach	Billy Hite	1978	2001
Offensive coordinator and tight ends	Bryan Stinespring	1990	2006 (offensive coordinator since 2002)
Defensive coordinator and inside linebackers	Bud Foster	1987	1995
Offensive Line	Curt Newsome	2006	2006
Wide Receivers	Kevin Sherman	2006	2006
Strong Safety, Outside Linebackers, and Recruiting Coordinator	Jim Cavanaugh	1996	2002
Quarterbacks	Mike O'Cain	2006	2006
Defensive backs	Torrian Gray	2006	2006
Defensive Line	Charley Wiles	1996	1996

=== Roster ===
Quarterback: 3 Ike Whitaker – RS Freshman; **7 Sean Glennon** – RS Sophomore; 12 Cory Holt – RS Sophomore; Tailback: 20 Kenny Lewis, Jr. – Freshman; 27 Jahre Cheeseman – RS Freshman; **28 Branden Ore** – RS Sophomore; 34 George Bell – RS Sophomore; 35 Dustin Pickle – Sophomore; 38 Elan Lewis – RS Freshman; Fullback: **37 Jesse Allen** – RS Senior; 39 Carlton Weatherford – RS Junior; 42 Kenny Jefferson – RS Freshman; 43 Billy Gorham – Junior; 44 Devin Perez – RS Sophomore; Flanker: **4 Eddie Royal** – Junior; 82 Brandon Dillard – RS Freshman; **87 David Clowney** – Senior; Split End: **2 Josh Morgan** – Junior; 16 Zach Luckett – (redshirt) Freshman; 19 Josh Hyman – RS Junior; 80 Justin Born – Junior; 81 Justin Harper – Junior; Tight End: **8 Greg Boone** – RS Freshman; **83 Sam Wheeler** – RS Freshman; 85 Ed Wang – RS Freshman; 88 Andre Smith – (redshirt) Freshman; Center: **69 Danny McGrath** – RS Senior	Offensive Guard: 51 Matt Welsh – RS Sophomore; **58 Ryan Shuman** – RS Sophomore; 62 Zac Lowe – Senior; 65 Antonio North – RS Freshman; 66 Brandon Holland – Freshman; 67 Nick Marshman – RS Sophomore; **70 Sergio Render** – Freshman; 79 Eric Davis – RS Freshman; Offensive Tackle: Hivera Green – RS Freshman; 57 Clark Crum – (redshirt) Freshman; 64 Richard Graham – RS Freshman; 68 Mason Baggett – RS Senior; 71 Aaron Brown – (redshirt) Freshman; **74 Brandon Frye** – RS Senior; **76 Duane Brown** – RS Junior; **77 Brandon Gore** – RS Senior; Defensive tackle: 50 ~~Joey Hall – (redshirt) Freshman~~; 55 Daryl Robertson – (redshirt) Freshman; **59 Barry Booker** – RS Junior; 60 Chris Burnett – RS Senior; 63 Watson Stelly – Junior; 75 Kory Robertson – RS Junior; 95 Cordarrow Thompson – RS Freshman; **99 Carlton Powell** – RS Junior; Defensive End: Jason Adjepong – (redshirt) Freshman; Steven Friday – (redshirt) Freshman; ~~40 William Wall – RS Freshman~~; 47 Nekos Brown – Freshman; **49 Chris Ellis** – RS Junior; 72 Matt Tilley – Sophomore; 90 Orion Martin – RS Sophomore; 91 John Graves – (redshirt) Freshman; **96 Noland Burchette** – RS Senior; Cornerback: **1 Victor Harris** – Sophomore; 5 Robert Alomar – Junior; 15 Roland Minor – RS Junior; **18 Brandon Flowers** – RS Sophomore; 21 Ryan Hash – RS Senior; 22 Stephan Virgil – Freshman	Linebacker: Devven Sutton – (redshirt) Freshman; 6 Andrew Bowman – RS Sophomore; **9 Vince Hall** – RS Junior; **11 Xavier Adibi** – RS Junior; 13 Corey Gordon – RS Junior; 26 Cody Grimm – RS Freshman; 29 Chad Grimm – Senior; **31 Brendan Hill** – RS Senior; 33 Brett Warren – (redshirt) Junior; 45 Purnell Sturdivant – RS Sophomore; 56 Demetrius Taylor – RS Freshman; 89 Jonas Houseright – RS Sophomore; ~~94 Matt Wright – (redshirt) Freshman~~; Free Safety: **25 D.J. Parker** – Junior; ~~26 Kent Hicks – RS Sophomore~~; 41 Cam Martin – RS Freshman; 48 Cory Price – Senior; Rover: 24 Dorian Porch – RS Freshman; 30 Cary Wade – RS Senior; 32 Jake Patten – Senior; **36 Aaron Rouse** – RS Senior; Place Kicker: **46 Brandon Pace** – RS Senior; 92 Jud Dunlevy – RS Junior; 98 Jared Develli – Junior; Punter: **23 Nic Schmitt** – RS Senior; 97 Brent Bowden – RS Freshman; Deep Snapper: **53 Nick Leeson** – RS Senior; 54 Bart McMillin – RS Junior; 61 Scott King – Junior
Starters are in **bold** and players who left the team are ~~struck out~~ (redshirt) Players who sat out during 2006 ("redshirted") are indicated with a "red shirt" icon

== Discipline issues ==
Virginia Tech penalties by game
Opponent	Tech Penalties	Opponent penalties
Northeastern	7 (56 yards)	10 (78 yards)
@ North Carolina	7 (55 yards)	1 (10 yards)
Duke	9 (85 yards)	7 (43 yards)
Cincinnati	7 (52 yards)	9 (75 yards)
Georgia Tech	5 (28 yards)	8 (83 yards)
Boston College	9 (88 yards)	9 (60 yards)
Southern Miss	5 (41 yards)	7 (45 yards)
Clemson	3 (22 yards)	1 (5 yards)
Miami	3 (15 yards)	8 (62 yards)
Kent State	5 (50 yards)	9 (71 yards)
Wake Forest	6 (65 yards)	3 (27 yards)
Virginia	3 (29 yards)	6 (45 yards)

The first half of Virginia Tech's season was characterized by a lack of discipline for the Hokies, both on and off the field.

- Safety Aaron Rouse was penalized twice against Duke for roughing the passer. His second hit on Duke quarterback Thaddeus Lewis was a helmet-to-sternum hit that whiplashed his head with such force that it gave him a concussion. Duke's backup quarterback said of Tech, "They are a fast team. I'm lucky to come out in one piece. ... The roughing of the passer, the late hits, they were coming for us."
- DE Chris Ellis and WR Josh Morgan were arrested late Saturday night after the Hokies' victory over Cincinnati and charged with resisting arrest and obstructing justice. Morgan was also charged with disorderly conduct. Both players were suspended for the following game, a home loss to Georgia Tech and were later sentenced to one year of probation and 100 hours of community service.
- WR Josh Hyman was suspended for the Boston College game after an arrest for driving under the influence.
- During the ESPN broadcast of the Boston College game, announcer Kirk Herbstreit became angry when cameras showed Tech players Vince Hall and Aaron Rouse arguing on the sidelines and showed linebacker Brendan Hill dancing on the sidelines with Tech trailing late in the game. The video of Herbstreit's rant was shown to the Tech team in Sunday meetings following the game.

Tech's discipline troubles came to a head when the Hokies were blown out in consecutive weeks by Georgia Tech and Boston College. Beamer responded by cracking down on trash-talking, personal fouls, and other negative behaviors. The team responded and committed no personal fouls and only two defensive penalties total in the three games following the BC loss.

== Defense ==
Virginia Tech finished the regular season leading the nation in total defense, scoring defense, and pass defense. This was the second year in a row that defensive coordinator Bud Foster's unit had led the nation in total defense.
