= 2006 Clemson Tigers football team =

American college football season

2006 Clemson Tigers football

Music City Bowl, L 20–28 vs. Kentucky
- Conference: Atlantic Coast Conference
- Atlantic Division
- Record: 8–5 (5–3 ACC)
- Head coach: Tommy Bowden (8th season)
- Offensive coordinator: Rob Spence (2nd season)
- Offensive scheme: Multiple
- Defensive coordinator: Vic Koenning (2nd season)
- Base defense: 4–3
- Captains: Gaines Adams; Chansi Stuckey; Anthony Waters
- Home stadium: Memorial Stadium

2006 Atlantic Coast Conference football standings
	Conf.			Overall
Team	W		L	W		L
Atlantic Division
No. 18 Wake Forest x$	6	–	2	11	–	3
No. 20 Boston College	5	–	3	10	–	3
Maryland	5	–	3	9	–	4
Clemson	5	–	3	8	–	5
Florida State	3	–	5	7	–	6
NC State	2	–	6	3	–	9
Coastal Division
Georgia Tech x	7	–	1	9	–	5
No. 19 Virginia Tech	6	–	2	10	–	3
Virginia	4	–	4	5	–	7
Miami (FL)	3	–	5	7	–	6
North Carolina	2	–	6	3	–	9
Duke	0	–	8	0	–	12
Championship: Wake Forest 9, Georgia Tech 6
$ – BCS representative as conference champion; x – Division champion/co-champions; Rankings from AP Poll

The 2006 Clemson Tigers football team represented Clemson University as a member of the Atlantic Coast Conference (ACC) during the 2006 NCAA Division I FBS football season. Led by eighth-year head coach Tommy Bowden, the Tigers compiled an overall record of 8–5 with a mark of 5–3 in conference play, placing in a three-way tie for second in the ACC's Atlantic Division. Clemson was invited to the Music City Bowl, where the Tigers lost to Kentucky. The team played home games at Memorial Stadium in Clemson, South Carolina.

Entering the season, the Tigers had high expectations, hoping to compete for a spot in the ACC Championship Game. After a defeat at Boston College in the second game of the season, Clemson won its next six contests, averaging nearly 42 points a game over the winning streak. But the Tigers lost four out of their last five games, including a loss to rival South Carolina in the regular season finale.

ESPN's College Gameday made its first-ever appearance in Clemson for the game between the Tigers and Georgia Tech on October 21. Portions of the season, specifically the games against Florida Atlantic and Florida State, were featured in the 2020 film Safety, about sophomore safety Ray McElrathbey taking care of his younger brother while their mother receives treatment for drug addiction.

== Schedule ==
Date	Time	Opponent	Rank	Site	TV	Result	Attendance
September 2	3:30 p.m.	Florida Atlantic*	No. 18	Memorial Stadium; Clemson, SC	ESPNU	W 54–6	78,693
September 9	3:30 p.m.	at Boston College	No. 18	Alumni Stadium; Chestnut Hill, MA (rivalry)	ABC	L 33–34 ^{2OT}	44,500
September 16	7:45 p.m.	at No. 9 Florida State		Doak Campbell Stadium; Tallahassee, FL (rivalry)	ESPN	W 27–20	83,510
September 23	12:00 p.m.	North Carolina	No. 19	Memorial Stadium; Clemson, SC	Raycom/LFS	W 52–7	81,886
September 30	7:00 p.m.	Louisiana Tech*	No. 18	Memorial Stadium; Clemson, SC	ESPNU	W 51–0	81,564
October 7	12:00 p.m.	at Wake Forest	No. 15	Groves Stadium; Winston-Salem, NC	ESPN	W 27–17	35,920
October 12	7:30 p.m.	vs. Temple*	No. 12	Bank of America Stadium; Charlotte, NC	ESPNU	W 63–9	30,246
October 21	7:45 p.m.	No. 13 Georgia Tech^{†}	No. 12	Memorial Stadium; Clemson, SC (rivalry, College GameDay)	ESPN	W 31–7	82,630
October 26	7:45 p.m.	at Virginia Tech	No. 10	Lane Stadium; Blacksburg, VA	ESPN	L 7–24	66,233
November 4	12:00 p.m.	Maryland	No. 19	Memorial Stadium; Clemson, SC	ESPN2	L 12–13	80,556
November 11	12:00 p.m.	NC State		Memorial Stadium; Clemson, SC (Textile Bowl)	Raycom/LFS	W 20–14	81,785
November 25	12:00 p.m.	South Carolina*	No. 24	Memorial Stadium; Clemson, SC (rivalry)	ESPN	L 28–31	83,428
December 29	1:00 p.m.	vs. Kentucky*		LP Field; Nashville, TN (Music City Bowl)	ESPN	L 20–28	68,024
*Non-conference game; ^{†}Homecoming; Rankings from AP Poll released prior to the game; All times are in Eastern time

== Rankings ==
Ranking movements Legend: ██ Increase in ranking ██ Decrease in ranking — = Not ranked RV = Received votes
	Week															
Poll	Pre	1	2	3	4	5	6	7	8	9	10	11	12	13	14	Final
AP	18	18	RV	19	18	15	12	12	10	19	RV	25	24	RV	—	—
Coaches	18	18	RV	23	19	15	12	12	11	19	RV	25	24	RV	—	—
Harris	Not released				19	15	12	12	12	19	—	—	24	—	—	Not released
BCS	Not released							12	12	19	—	—	24	—	—	Not released

== Game summaries ==
=== Florida Atlantic ===
Team	1	2	3	4	Total
Florida Atl	0	0	6	0	6
• Clemson	10	14	14	16	54

- Date: September 2
- Location: Memorial Stadium, Clemson, South Carolina
- Game start: 3:30 p.m. EST
- TV announcers (ESPNU): Dave Armstrong, Mike Tomczak

Scoring summary
Q1	CLEM	Dean 25 yard field goal	CLEM 3–0
Q1	CLEM	Stuckey 31 yard pass from Proctor (Dean kick)	CLEM 10–0
Q2	CLEM	Merriweather 1 yard run (Dean kick)	CLEM 17–0
Q2	CLEM	Kelly 14 yard pass from Proctor (Dean kick)	CLEM 24–0
Q3	FAU	Leroy 24 yard field goal	CLEM 24–3
Q3	FAU	Leroy 33 yard field goal	CLEM 24–6
Q3	CLEM	Davis 22 yard run (Dean kick)	CLEM 31–6
Q3	CLEM	Taylor 18 yard pass from Proctor (Dean kick)	CLEM 38–6
Q4	CLEM	Dean 41 yard field goal	CLEM 41–6
Q4	CLEM	Ford 92 yard punt return (kick failed)	CLEM 47–6
Q4	CLEM	Gilliam 34 yard fumble return (Dean kick)	CLEM 54–6

=== Florida State ===
Team	1	2	3	4	Total
• Clemson	6	8	6	7	27
Florida St	2	7	3	8	20

- Date: September 16
- Location: Doak Campbell Stadium, Tallahassee, Florida
- Game start: 7:45 p.m. EST
- TV announcers (ESPN): Mike Patrick, Todd Blackledge, Holly Rowe

Scoring summary
Q1	CLEM	Davis 8 yard run (kick blocked)	CLEM 6–0
Q1	FSU	Carter returned extra point	CLEM 6–2
Q2	FSU	Carter 69 yard blocked punt return (Cismesia kick)	FSU 9–6
Q2	CLEM	Stuckey 19 yard pass from Proctor (Stuckey pass from Proctor)	CLEM 14–9
Q3	CLEM	Proctor 20 yard run (run failed)	CLEM 20–9
Q3	FSU	Cismesia 25 yard field goal	CLEM 20–12
Q4	FSU	Surratt 1 yard run (Davis pass from Weatherford)	Tie 20–20
Q4	CLEM	Davis 1 yard run (Dean kick)	CLEM 27–20

Clemson's first win in Tallahassee since 1989.

== Coaching staff ==
- Tommy Bowden: head coach
- Rob Spence: offensive coordinator, quarterbacks
- Vic Koenning: defensive Coordinator, defensive backs
- Brad Scott: assistant head coach, offensive line
- David Blackwell, recruiting coordinator, linebackers
- Burton Burns: running backs
- Billy Napier: tight ends
- Chris Rumph: defensive line
- Dabo Swinney: wide receivers
- Ron West: outside linebackers
- Mike Dooley: defensive video graduate assistant
- Andy Ford: defensive graduate assistant
- Paul Hogan: offensive graduate assistant
- Willie Simmons: offensive video graduate assistant
