= 2006 NC State Wolfpack football team =

American college football team season

2006 NC State Wolfpack football
- Conference: Atlantic Coast Conference
- Atlantic Division
- Record: 3–9 (2–6 ACC)
- Head coach: Chuck Amato (7th season)
- Offensive coordinator: Marc Trestman (2nd season)
- Defensive coordinator: Steve Dunlap (2nd season)
- Home stadium: Carter–Finley Stadium

2006 Atlantic Coast Conference football standings
	Conf.			Overall
Team	W		L	W		L
Atlantic Division
No. 18 Wake Forest x$	6	–	2	11	–	3
No. 20 Boston College	5	–	3	10	–	3
Maryland	5	–	3	9	–	4
Clemson	5	–	3	8	–	5
Florida State	3	–	5	7	–	6
NC State	2	–	6	3	–	9
Coastal Division
Georgia Tech x	7	–	1	9	–	5
No. 19 Virginia Tech	6	–	2	10	–	3
Virginia	4	–	4	5	–	7
Miami (FL)	3	–	5	7	–	6
North Carolina	2	–	6	3	–	9
Duke	0	–	8	0	–	12
Championship: Wake Forest 9, Georgia Tech 6
$ – BCS representative as conference champion; x – Division champion/co-champions; Rankings from AP Poll

The 2006 NC State Wolfpack football team represented North Carolina State University during the 2006 NCAA Division I FBS football season. The team's head coach was Chuck Amato. N. State has been a member of the Atlantic Coast Conference (ACC) since the league's inception in 1953, and has participated in that conference's Atlantic Division since 2005. The Wolfpack played its home games in 2006 at Carter–Finley Stadium in Raleigh, North Carolina, which has been NC State football's home stadium since 1966.

== Schedule ==
Date	Time	Opponent	Site	TV	Result	Attendance	Source
September 2	6:00 pm	No. 1 (FCS) Appalachian State*	Carter–Finley Stadium; Raleigh, NC		W 23–10	57,583	
September 9	12:00 pm	Akron*	Carter–Finley Stadium; Raleigh, NC	ESPNU	L 17–20	56,103	
September 16	7:00 pm	at Southern Miss*	M. M. Roberts Stadium; Hattiesburg, MS		L 17–37	31,748	
September 23	8:00 pm	No. 21 Boston College	Carter–Finley Stadium; Raleigh, NC	ESPN2	W 17–15	57,583	
October 5	7:30 pm	No. 16 Florida State	Carter–Finley Stadium; Raleigh, NC	ESPN	W 24–20	57,437	
October 14	12:00 pm	Wake Forest	Carter–Finley Stadium; Raleigh, NC (rivalry)	LFS	L 23–25	55,972	
October 21	12:00 pm	at Maryland	Byrd Stadium; College Park, MD	LFS	L 20–26	50,230	
October 28	12:00 pm	at Virginia	Scott Stadium; Charlottesville, VA	LFS	L 7–14	55,730	
November 4	7:00 pm	No. 20 Georgia Tech^{†}	Carter–Finley Stadium; Raleigh, NC	ESPNU	L 23–31	56,837	
November 11	12:00 pm	at Clemson	Memorial Stadium; Clemson, SC (Textile Bowl)	LFS	L 14–20	81,785	
November 18	12:00 pm	at North Carolina	Kenan Memorial Stadium; Chapel Hill, NC (rivalry)	LFS	L 9–23	54,000	
November 25	7:00 pm	East Carolina*	Carter-Finley Stadium; Raleigh, NC (rivalry)	ESPNU	L 16–21	54,264	
*Non-conference game; ^{†}Homecoming; Rankings from Coaches' Poll released prior to the game; All times are in Eastern time
