= 2006 North Carolina Tar Heels football team =

American college football season

2006 North Carolina Tar Heels football
- Conference: Atlantic Coast Conference
- Coastal Division
- Record: 3–9 (2–6 ACC)
- Head coach: John Bunting (6th season)
- Offensive coordinator: Frank Cignetti Jr. (1st season)
- Offensive scheme: Pro-style
- Defensive coordinator: Marvin Sanders (3rd season)
- Base defense: 4–3
- Captains: Melik Brown; Ronnie McGill; Kareen Taylor
- Home stadium: Kenan Memorial Stadium

2006 Atlantic Coast Conference football standings
| | Conf. | | | Overall |
| Team | W | | L | W | | L |
|---|---|---|---|---|---|---|
Atlantic Division
| No. 18 Wake Forest x$ | 6 | – | 2 | 11 | – | 3 |
| No. 20 Boston College | 5 | – | 3 | 10 | – | 3 |
| Maryland | 5 | – | 3 | 9 | – | 4 |
| Clemson | 5 | – | 3 | 8 | – | 5 |
| Florida State | 3 | – | 5 | 7 | – | 6 |
| NC State | 2 | – | 6 | 3 | – | 9 |
Coastal Division
| Georgia Tech x | 7 | – | 1 | 9 | – | 5 |
| No. 19 Virginia Tech | 6 | – | 2 | 10 | – | 3 |
| Virginia | 4 | – | 4 | 5 | – | 7 |
| Miami (FL) | 3 | – | 5 | 7 | – | 6 |
| North Carolina | 2 | – | 6 | 3 | – | 9 |
| Duke | 0 | – | 8 | 0 | – | 12 |
Championship: Wake Forest 9, Georgia Tech 6
$ – BCS representative as conference champion; x – Division champion/co-champions; Rankings from AP Poll

The 2006 North Carolina Tar Heels football team represented the University of North Carolina at Chapel Hill as a member of Coastal Division of the Atlantic Coast Conference (ACC) during the 2006 NCAA Division I FBS football season. Led by sixth-year head coach John Bunting, the Tar Heels played their home games at Kenan Memorial Stadium in Chapel Hill, North Carolina. North Carolina finished the season 3–9 overall and 2–6 in ACC play to place fifth in the Coastal Division.

== Schedule ==
| Date | Time | Opponent | Site | TV | Result | Attendance | Source |
|---|---|---|---|---|---|---|---|
| September 2 | 3:30 p.m. | Rutgers* | Kenan Memorial Stadium; Chapel Hill, NC | ABC | L 16–21 | 50,000 | |
| September 9 | 12:00 p.m. | No. 16 Virginia Tech | Kenan Memorial Stadium; Chapel Hill, NC | ESPN | L 10–35 | 57,000 | |
| September 16 | 7:00 p.m. | No. 4 (FCS) Furman* | Kenan Memorial Stadium; Chapel Hill, NC | ESPNU | W 45–42 | 47,000 | |
| September 23 | 12:00 p.m. | at No. 19 Clemson | Memorial Stadium; Clemson, SC | ESPN360 | L 7–52 | 81,886 | |
| October 7 | 12:00 p.m. | at Miami | Miami Orange Bowl; Miami, FL | LFS | L 7–27 | 29,621 | |
| October 14 | 12:00 p.m. | South Florida* | Kenan Memorial Stadium; Chapel Hill, NC | ESPNU | L 20–37 | 44,000 | |
| October 19 | 7:30 p.m. | at Virginia | Scott Stadium; Charlottesville, VA (South's Oldest Rivalry) | ESPN | L 0–23 | 56,632 | |
| October 28 | 3:30 p.m. | No. 24 Wake Forest | Kenan Memorial Stadium; Chapel Hill, NC (rivalry) | ESPNU | L 17–24 | 49,000 | |
| November 4 | 2:30 p.m. | at No. 11 Notre Dame* | Notre Dame Stadium; Notre Dame, IN (rivalry) | NBC | L 26–45 | 80,795 | |
| November 11 | 12:00 p.m. | No. 19 Georgia Tech^{†} | Kenan Memorial Stadium; Chapel Hill, NC | LFS | L 0–7 | 41,000 | |
| November 18 | 12:00 p.m. | NC State | Kenan Memorial Stadium; Chapel Hill, NC (rivalry) | LFS | W 23–9 | 54,000 | |
| November 25 | 12:00 p.m. | at Duke | Wallace Wade Stadium; Durham, NC (Victory Bell) | ESPN360 | W 45–44 | 24,478 | |
*Non-conference game; ^{†}Homecoming; Rankings from AP Poll released prior to the game; All times are in Eastern time

== Coaching staff ==
The 2006 season was the last for John Bunting as head coach. He was to be replaced by Butch Davis in the postseason.

| Name | Position | Seasons in Position |
|---|---|---|
| John Bunting | Head coach | 6th |
| Dave Brock | Assistant head coach / wide receivers / recruiting coordinator | 2nd |
| Ken Browning | Defensive tackles | 13th |
| Frank Cignetti | Offensive coordinator / quarterbacks | 1st |
| Jeff Connors | Strength and conditioning coordinator | 6th |
| John Gutekunst | Assistant head coach / tight ends | 3rd |
| Danny Pearman | Defensive ends | 1st |
| Andre' Powell | Special teams coordinator / running backs | 6th |
| Marvin Sanders | Defensive coordinator / defensive backs | 3rd |
| Tommy Thigpen | Linebackers | 2nd |
| Mark Weber | Offensive Line | 1st |
| Chad Scott | Graduate assistant | 1st |

== Team statistics ==
| Passing leaders | Cmp | Att | Yds | TD | Int |
|---|---|---|---|---|---|
| Joe Dailey | 112 | 195 | 1316 | 7 | 10 |
| Cameron Sexton | 57 | 136 | 840 | 4 | 8 |

| Rushing leaders | Car | Yds | Long | TD |
|---|---|---|---|---|
| Ronnie McGill | 192 | 790 | 48 | 7 |
| Barrington Edwards | 91 | 330 | 34 | 2 |
| Justin Warren | 7 | 77 | 23 | 1 |

| Receiving leaders | Rec | Yds | Long | TD |
|---|---|---|---|---|
| Hakeem Nicks | 39 | 660 | 83 | 4 |
| Brooks Foster | 38 | 486 | 39 | 2 |
| Jesse Holley | 37 | 466 | 50 | 2 |

| Kicking | XPM | XPA | FGM | FGM | Long | Pts |
|---|---|---|---|---|---|---|
| Connor Barth | 24 | 24 | 10 | 10 | 54 | 54 |
