= 2006 Miami Hurricanes football team =

American college football season

2006 Miami Hurricanes football

MPC Computers Bowl champion

MPC Computers Bowl, W 21–20 vs. Nevada
- Conference: Atlantic Coast Conference
- Coastal
- Record: 7–6 (3–5 ACC)
- Head coach: Larry Coker (6th season)
- Offensive coordinator: Rich Olson (1st season)
- Offensive scheme: Pro-style
- Defensive coordinator: Randy Shannon (6th season)
- Base defense: 4–3 Cover 2
- Home stadium: Miami Orange Bowl (c. 72,319, grass)

2006 Atlantic Coast Conference football standings
	Conf.			Overall
Team	W		L	W		L
Atlantic Division
No. 18 Wake Forest x$	6	–	2	11	–	3
No. 20 Boston College	5	–	3	10	–	3
Maryland	5	–	3	9	–	4
Clemson	5	–	3	8	–	5
Florida State	3	–	5	7	–	6
NC State	2	–	6	3	–	9
Coastal Division
Georgia Tech x	7	–	1	9	–	5
No. 19 Virginia Tech	6	–	2	10	–	3
Virginia	4	–	4	5	–	7
Miami (FL)	3	–	5	7	–	6
North Carolina	2	–	6	3	–	9
Duke	0	–	8	0	–	12
Championship: Wake Forest 9, Georgia Tech 6
$ – BCS representative as conference champion; x – Division champion/co-champions; Rankings from AP Poll

The 2006 Miami Hurricanes football team represented the University of Miami during the 2006 NCAA Division I FBS football season. It was the Hurricanes' 81st season of football and 3rd as a member of the Atlantic Coast Conference. The Hurricanes were led by sixth-year head coach Larry Coker and played their home games at the Orange Bowl. They finished the season 7–6 overall and 3–5 in the ACC to finish in fourth place in the Coastal Division. They were invited to the MPC Computers Bowl where they defeated Nevada, 21–20.

== Preseason ==
Miami began the season ranked #11 in the USA Today Coaches Poll and #12 in the Associated Press Poll after going 9–3 (6–2 ACC) in 2005 with a #18 ranking in the USA Today Coaches Poll (#17 AP).

Junior quarterback Kyle Wright finished second to Georgia Tech Yellow Jackets wide receiver Calvin Johnson in voting for the ACC Preseason Player of the Year.

Earlier during the summer, head coach Larry Coker announced that running back Tyrone Moss, receiver Ryan Moore, linebacker James Bryant, and receiver Rashaun Jones would be suspended for the first game of the season against Florida State for violating team policy. On August 26, Coker announced that Moore's suspension would be extended indefinitely. Moore would eventually return for the final two regular season games.

After back-to-back 9–3 seasons at Miami, where expectations are to compete for a national championship every year, it was widely believed that Coker was on the proverbial hot seat and needed to take the Hurricanes to a BCS bowl to keep his job. In the wake of last year's Peach Bowl loss, Coker fired four assistant coaches. During the offseason, Coker hired Rich Olson as his new offensive coordinator in an attempt to reinvigorate the Hurricane offense. Olson had previously served as Miami's offensive coordinator during the early 1990s under then-head coach Dennis Erickson.

ESPN college football analyst Kirk Herbstreit picked Miami to win the 2006 national championship, predicting the Hurricanes would defeat Notre Dame in the national championship game.

See also 2006 NCAA Division I-A football rankings

=== Award candidates ===
The following Hurricanes were named to preseason awards watch lists:

- Kyle Wright - Maxwell Award
- Greg Olsen - Maxwell Award, John Mackey Award
- Brandon Meriweather - Bronko Nagurski Award, Chuck Bednarik Award, Jim Thorpe Award
- Kenny Phillips - Chuck Bednarik Award, Jim Thorpe Award
- Tyrone Moss - Maxwell Award
- Baraka Atkins - Bronko Nagurski Award
- Kareem Brown - Chuck Bednarik Award
- Anthony Reddick - Jim Thorpe Award

== Schedule ==
Date	Time	Opponent	Rank	Site	TV	Result	Attendance	Source
September 4	8:00 pm	No. 11 Florida State	No. 12	Miami Orange Bowl; Miami, FL (rivalry) (College GameDay)	ESPN	L 10–13	71,481	
September 9	7:00 pm	Florida A&M*	No. 17	Miami Orange Bowl; Miami, FL	ESPN360	W 51–10	40,208	
September 16	3:30 pm	at No. 12 Louisville*	No. 17	Papa John's Cardinal Stadium; Louisville, KY (rivalry)	ABC	L 7–31	42,704	
September 30	6:00 pm	Houston*		Miami Orange Bowl; Miami, FL	ESPN2	W 14–13	36,107	
October 7	12:00 pm	North Carolina		Miami Orange Bowl; Miami, FL	Raycom	W 27–7	29,621	
October 14	7:00 pm	FIU*		Miami Orange Bowl; Miami, FL	CSS	W 35–0	51,130	
October 21	1:00 pm	at Duke		Wallace Wade Stadium; Durham, NC	ESPN360	W 20–15	16,291	
October 28	3:30 pm	at No. 21 Georgia Tech		Bobby Dodd Stadium; Atlanta, GA	ABC	L 23–30	55,320	
November 4	8:00 pm	No. 23 Virginia Tech^{†}		Miami Orange Bowl; Miami, FL (rivalry)	ABC	L 10–17	41,504	
November 11	3:30 pm	at No. 23 Maryland		Byrd Stadium; College Park, MD	ABC	L 13–14	50,721	
November 18	12:00 pm	at Virginia		Scott Stadium; Charlottesville, VA	Raycom	L 7–17	54,552	
November 23	8:00 pm	No. 18 Boston College		Miami Orange Bowl; Miami, FL	ESPN	W 17–14	23,308	
December 31	7:30 pm	vs. Nevada*		Bronco Stadium; Boise, ID (MPC Computers Bowl)	ESPN	W 21–20	28,654	
*Non-conference game; ^{†}Homecoming; Rankings from Coaches' Poll released prior to the game; All times are in Eastern time

== Rankings ==
Ranking movements Legend: ██ Increase in ranking ██ Decrease in ranking — = Not ranked RV = Received votes
	Week															
Poll	Pre	1	2	3	4	5	6	7	8	9	10	11	12	13	14	Final
AP	12	17	17	RV	RV	RV	RV	RV	RV	—	—	—	—	—	—	—
Coaches Poll	11	16	15	RV	RV	RV	RV	RV	RV	—	—	—	—	—	—	—
Harris	Not released				—	—	—	—	—	—	—	—	—	—	—	Not released
BCS	Not released							—	—	—	—	—	—	—	—	Not released

== Personnel ==
=== Coaching staff ===
Position	Name	Yrs. in current pos. (Total Yrs. at UM)
Head coach	Larry Coker	6 (12)
Offensive coordinator	Rich Olson	1 (4)
Defensive coordinator	Randy Shannon	6 (14)
Special teams coordinator/TEs	Joe Pannunzio	1 (1)
Quarterbacks	Todd Berry	1 (1)
Offensive line	Mario Cristobal	1 (6)
Wide receivers	Marques Mosley	1 (1)
Defensive line	John Palermo	1 (1)
Asst. defensive line	Clint Hurtt	1 (5)
Defensive backs	Tim Walton	3 (3)
Strength & conditioning	Andreu Swasey	6 (9)

=== Depth chart ===
Defense

FS
Brandon Meriweather
Anthony Reddick
Lovon Ponder

WLB	MLB	SLB
⋅	Glenn Cook	⋅
Willie Williams	Darryl Sharpton	⋅
Spencer Adkins	James Bryant	⋅

SS
Kenny Phillips
Willie Cooper
⋅

CB
Randy Phillips
Carlos Armour
⋅

DE	DT	DT	DE
Bryan Pata	Teraz McCray	Kareem Brown	Baraka Atkins
Calais Campbell	Luqman Abdullah	Antonio Dixon	Eric Moncur
Rhyan Anderson	Vegas Franklin	Andres Arroyo	Courtney Harris

CB
Glenn Sharpe
Bruce Johnson
⋅

Offense

WR
Ryan Moore
Lance Leggett
⋅

LT	LG	C	RG	RT
Jason Fox	A.J. Trump	Anthony Wollschlager	Derrick Morse	Tyrone Byrd
Tyrone Byrd	Andrew Bain	Alex Pou	Andrew Bain	Cyrim Wimbs
Chris Barney	John Rochford	Jonathan St. Pierre	Alex Pou	Matt Pipho

TE
Greg Olsen
Richard Gordon
Benny Fernandez

WR
Darnell Jenkins
Khalil Jones
⋅

QB
Kyle Wright
Kirby Freeman
Matt Perrelli

Key reserves
RB Andrew Johnson
LB Demetri Stewart
RB Charlie Jones

RB
Javarris James
Tyrone Moss
Derron Thomas

FB
James Bryant
Jerrell Mabry
Mark Lisante

Special teams
PK Jon Peattie
PK Francesco Zampogna
P Brian Monroe
P Jon Peattie
KR Darnell Jenkins
PR Bruce Johnson

== Game recaps ==
=== Florida State ===
	1	2	3	4	Total
#10 Florida State	3	0	0	10	13
#11 Miami	0	10	0	0	10

This was the third time in the last three years that archrivals Miami and Florida State opened the season against each other. The previous two games were also low-scoring defensive struggles, with the Hurricanes winning, 16–10, in overtime in 2004, and the Seminoles prevailing, 10–7, in 2005.

The game was the most-viewed college football game, regular season or bowl, in the history of ESPN, averaging 6,330,000 million households in viewership (6.9 rating). It was also the second-highest rated game in ESPN history, behind only the 1994 game between Miami and FSU, which notched a 7.7 rating

=== Florida A&M ===
	1	2	3	4	Total
Florida A&M	0	3	7	0	10
#16 Miami	7	14	21	9	51

This was the seventh meeting between Miami and Florida A&M. Miami continues to lead the all-time series, 6–1. The two teams had last met in 2002, with Miami winning, 63–17.

=== Louisville ===
	1	2	3	4	Total
#15 Miami	7	0	0	0	7
#12 Louisville	0	10	14	7	31

This was the eleventh meeting between the schools. Prior to this game, Miami had never lost to Louisville, owning an all-time record of 9–0–1. Miami won the previous meeting in 2004, 41–38, in a game in which the Hurricanes had to rally late from a 17–point deficit. After this humiliating loss in the rain to Louisville, Miami became unranked for the first time in 107 weeks – the then-longest current streak in college football. The game was highlighted by a pre-game confrontation between the teams that was sparked when several Miami players provocatively stomped on the Louisville Cardinal bird logo located at mid-field of Papa John's Cardinal Stadium. Four other teams (East Carolina, South Florida, Cincinnati, and Rutgers) had stomped on the logo in the past, and each wound up losing the game.

=== Houston ===
	1	2	3	4	Total
Houston	0	10	3	0	13
Miami	7	0	7	0	14

In the eighteenth meeting between the schools, Miami extended the all-time series lead to 11–7. Miami won 14–13, after a 27-yard gain on 3rd and 24 which led to a touchdown pass by Kyle Wright to James Bryant and gave Miami the win. Freshman RB Javarris James set a school rushing record for freshman by posting 148 rushing yards, breaking the previous record of 147 rushing yards set by Clinton Portis. Prior to the game, a number of airplanes hired by Miami fans unhappy with the team's poor start circled over the Orange Bowl while carrying banners demanding the firing of the embattled Coker, as well as Athletic Director Paul Dee.

=== North Carolina ===
	1	2	3	4	Total
North Carolina	0	7	0	0	7
Miami	7	10	7	3	27

Freshman Javarris James further solidified his hold on the starting running back position by rushing for over 100 yards for the second consecutive week. James carried 16 times for 111 yards (6.9 ypc), including a dazzling 62-yard touchdown run in the third quarter which put the game out of reach. Tight end Greg Olsen had his best game of the season, catching 8 passes for 95 yards, while the Miami defense limited North Carolina to just 244 yards of total offense and forced 3 Tar Heel turnovers. The win gave Miami its first winning streak of the 2006 campaign as the Hurricanes improved to 3–2 overall. It was also Miami's first ACC win of the year, evening its conference record at 1–1.

=== Florida International ===
	1	2	3	4	Total
Florida International	0	0	0	0	0
Miami	0	7	14	14	35

This was the first meeting between the Hurricanes and the crosstown Golden Panthers, who began active competition as a football program in 2002. Kyle Wright threw for three touchdowns, and the Miami defense held the Golden Panthers to 148 total yards.

However, this game would become one of the biggest embarrassments in the history of both schools. After trash-talk between players from both teams during the opening minutes, and an incident in which FIU wide receiver Chandler Williams dove helmet-first into a prone Kenny Phillips after Miami intercepted a pass, the game turned truly ugly in the third quarter.

After James Bryant caught Wright's second TD pass, he pointed to the FIU bench and bowed to the crowd, drawing an unsportsmanlike conduct penalty for his act. At the end of the ensuing conversion, FIU's Chris Smith wrestled Miami holder Matt Perelli to the ground and punched him. Another Golden Panther, Marshall McDuffie Jr., kicked Perelli on the ground. Players from each side joined the pile, and both benches quickly emptied, with fights breaking out in several parts of the field. Several players from both teams threw punches, Miami cornerback Brandon Meriweather was seen trying to stomp on FIU players, and another Golden Panther, Amod Ned, was seen swinging a crutch at Miami players. During the melee, Canes safety Anthony Reddick ran across the field and swung his helmet at FIU cornerback Robert Mitchell, hitting him.

Five Canes were ejected—Carlos Armour, Chris Barney, Bruce Johnson, Charlie Jones, and Derrick Morse. Eight Golden Panthers were ejected as well. Coach Larry Coker also indefinitely suspended Meriweather and Reddick for their parts in the fracas, plus Bryant for his taunting gesture that arguably triggered the melee.

In the aftermath, Coker called the brawl "disgraceful". adding the following day, "I don't have many bad days. This is a bad day. And last night was a bad night." For his part, FIU head coach Don Strock said "I can promise you that this will never happen again." Other officials from both universities also publicly apologized.

The day after the game, the ACC suspended a total of 13 Miami players, and the Sun Belt Conference suspended 18 FIU players.

=== Duke ===
	1	2	3	4	Total
Miami	7	10	3	0	20
Duke	0	0	2	13	15

Playing without 13 players who were suspended for their actions in the previous week's brawl with FIU, and missing starting tight end Greg Olsen and starting linebacker Jon Beason due to injury, the shorthanded 'Canes raced out to a 20–2 third quarter lead behind strong play from QB Kyle Wright. Underdog Duke would not give up, though, rallying to score two unanswered fourth-quarter touchdowns to trim Miami's lead to 20–15 (Duke failed to convert a two-point conversion attempt on the second touchdown). Meanwhile, the Duke defense put the clamps on Miami's running game, holding the Hurricanes to a paltry 37 yards rushing on 25 carries (1.5 ypc) for the game. Duke, however, could not capitalize on two opportunities to take the lead. After driving down to the Miami 29-yard line with less than 3:30 remaining in the game, Duke was stopped on a fourth down attempt and turned the ball over to Miami. Duke's defense would bend, as Miami drove down to the Duke 34, but Duke was able to stop Miami on third down. Faced with a 4th-and-2 from Duke's 34-yard line with inside 2:15 remaining, Miami head coach Larry Coker elected to punt and rely on his vaunted defense rather than go for it on fourth down or attempt a long field goal.

Duke took over from its own 11-yard line and strung together an impressive drive that brought the Blue Devils down to the Hurricanes' 6-yard line with :03 remaining in the game. On third down and with time expiring, Duke QB Thaddeus Lewis' threw a pass intended for wide receiver Eron Riley in the left side of the endzone. However, Miami safety Willie Cooper was lying in wait and was able to jump the route and intercept Lewis' pass at the goal line. Cooper returned the ball all the way to the Duke 15-yard line before voluntarily falling to the ground to end the game and deny Duke what would have been a momentous upset.

Wright completed 23 of 41 passes for 291 yards, 2 touchdowns, and 1 interception. Duke wide receiver Jomar Wright was impressive in defeat, catching 10 passes for 170 yards against Miami's makeshift secondary. Miami sophomore safety Kenny Phillips intercepted three passes, tying a school record. Phillips was named the ACC's Defensive Back of the Week for his stellar play.

Miami improved to 5–2 on the year with a 2–1 ACC record, setting up a showdown the next week with Georgia Tech for control of the ACC's Coastal Division.

=== Georgia Tech ===
	1	2	3	4	Total
Miami	10	3	3	7	23
#21 Georgia Tech	3	10	0	17	30

Georgia Tech (5–2, 3–1 ACC) entered the game in first place in the ACC's Coastal Division, leading second-place Miami (5–2, 2–1 ACC) by 1/2 game in the standings. The winner of this showdown would gain control its own destiny and be able to assure itself of a berth in the ACC Championship by winning the remainder of its games.

Miami got on the board first when Georgia Tech quarterback Reggie Ball fumbled the ball at the Georgia Tech 18-yard line during the Yellow Jackets' opening drive. Miami linebacker Glenn Cook returned the fumble for a Miami touchdown. After Miami forced a punt on the Jackets next possession, Javarris James broke a 49-yard run that set up a 38-yard field goal from Jon Peattie, putting Miami ahead, 10–0. Georgia Tech answered with a 12-play, 53-yard drive on its ensuing possession, highlighted by a 43-yard pass from Ball to receiver Calvin Johnson that set up a 39-yard field goal from Travis Bell, cutting the Miami lead to 10–3 at the end of the first quarter.

Miami added another field goal early in the second quarter to push its lead to 13–3. After a 22-yard punt by Miami's Brian Monroe gave Georgia Tech the ball at the Miami 46-yard line, Tech scored a touchdown on its first play when Ball connected with James Johnson for a 46-yard touchdown strike, bringing the Jackets within 3. Georgia Tech later intercepted a Kyle Wright pass in Miami territory, which enabled the Jackets to add a game-tying field goal before the half.

On its first possession of the second half, Miami moved the ball 69 yards before the drive was ended when receiver Lance Leggett fumbled at the Georgia Tech 10-yard line. Miami forced Georgia Tech to go three-and-out before embarking on a long 14-play, 54-yard drive that ate up 6:59 and ended with another Peattie field goal, putting the Hurricanes back in front, 16–13.

Georgia Tech would respond with 17 unanswered fourth-quarter points. The first three came by way of a 39-yard field goal from Bell. That drive was not without controversy, however, as replays appeared to show Miami safety Brandon Meriweather intercept a pass from Ball on a 2nd-and-11 from the Miami 31. The play was ruled an incomplete pass by the referees on the field. The officials in the replay booth declined to initiate an instant replay review of the play, nor did Miami coach Larry Coker, who still had one timeout remaining, initiate a coach's challenge. Instead of Miami taking over with its lead intact, Georgia Tech retained possession, and, after picking up nine yards on third down, successfully kicked a game-tying field goal from the Miami 22.

The Jackets forced Miami to punt, and, on its next possession, Georgia Tech went 74 yards in 9 plays, scoring on a 1-yard touchdown pass from Ball to Johnson. On Miami's next possession, Wright was sacked by Adamm Oliver and fumbled at the Miami 35. The ball was recovered by Georgia Tech's Kamichael Hall, who returned it eight yards to the Miami 27. Two plays later, running back Tashard Choice ran for a 25-yard touchdown, giving Georgia Tech a 30–16 lead with 3:30 remaining, seemingly sealing the game.

Miami, however, made things interesting when Wright hooked up with tight end Greg Olsen for a 41-yard touchdown pass on the third play of Miami's next possession, making the score 30–23 with just 2:10 remaining in the game. Coker, who only had one timeout left, elected to kick deep on the ensuing kickoff rather than attempt an onside kick. Miami was able to force Georgia Tech to punt and was set to take possession with less than :30 remaining and no timeouts. However, Miami punt returner Rashaun Jones fumbled the punt and the ball was recovered by Georgia Tech's Chris Dunlap, giving Georgia Tech the win.

With the loss, Miami fell to 5–3 (2–2 ACC) on the year, causing the already intense criticism of coach Coker and quarterback Wright to intensify. James was productive in defeat, gaining 112 yards on 19 carries, while Olsen caught 5 passes for 91 yards and a touchdown.

=== Virginia Tech ===
	1	2	3	4	Total
#24 Virginia Tech	0	10	0	7	17
Miami	0	0	3	7	10

Virginia Tech avenged a 27–7 loss from the previous year by dealing reeling Miami its fourth loss of the 2006 season. Miami's defense was stout in defeat, holding the visiting Hokies to just 139 yards of total offense (86 passing, 53 rushing). Running back Tyrone Moss, filling in after starter Javarris James was forced from the game early in the first half with a hip pointer, had a strong game, rushing 13 times for 103 yards. The highlight of Moss' evening was a 50-yard touchdown run early in the fourth quarter that tied the score at 10. But it was not enough to overcome Miami's sputtering pass offense. Kyle Wright struggled badly, completing just 14 of 29 passes for 84 yards. Wright also threw two critical interceptions late in the game. The first led to what would prove to be Virginia Tech's game-winning touchdown, while the second came on the first play of Miami's ensuing possession, essentially sealing the defeat. The homecoming loss served to only intensify criticism of the struggling Wright, who was booed lustily at times during the game. Coker, the team's embattled head coach, was also the subject of boos from the crowd. The loss was Miami's fifth consecutive against ranked opponents dating back to the previous season's Peach Bowl loss to LSU, and ensured Miami of its first four-loss season since 1999.

=== Maryland ===
	1	2	3	4	Total
Miami	0	10	0	3	13
#24 Maryland	7	7	0	0	14

Playing in its first game since the murder of defensive lineman Bryan Pata (see Bryan Pata murder below), a mourning Miami team dropped its third straight game, 14–13, to the #24 Maryland Terrapins at Byrd Stadium, falling to 5–5 on the season (2–4 ACC). Sophomore quarterback Kirby Freeman, starting in place of the injured Kyle Wright, played well in his first collegiate start, completing 14 of 27 passes for 140 yards, 1 touchdown, and 1 interception. Freeman also rushed for 51 yards on 9 carries. However, a couple of long pass plays surrendered by the Hurricane defense early in the game proved to be the difference. Maryland took a 7–0 lead early in the first quarter when quarterback Sam Hollenbach hooked up with receiver Darrius Heyward-Bey on a 65-yard touchdown pass. Hollenbach would find Heyward-Bey again in the second quarter for a 96-yard touchdown pass, both the longest pass play in Maryland history and the longest pass ever surrendered by Miami. Miami would fight back, though, and cut the Maryland lead to one point in the fourth quarter. But after forcing Maryland to punt with 1:14 to go in the game, Miami returner Bruce Johnson fumbled the punt and Maryland recovered, enabling the Terrapins to run the clock out and walk away with the victory. Miami dominated the game statistically, racking up 320 yards and 18 first downs while holding the ball for 37:09, compared to just 258 yards, 6 first downs, and 22:51 of possession for Maryland, but was unable to convert that statistical advantage into a victory. Maryland fans stormed the field in celebration after the final whistle.

The loss was Miami's sixth straight against a ranked opponent, and was the third straight loss, and fourth loss overall, in which the Canes had a chance to tie or win the game on their final possession, but squandered the opportunity with a turnover.

=== Virginia ===
	1	2	3	4	Total
Miami	0	0	0	7	7
Virginia	7	7	0	3	17

Miami lost its fourth straight game, losing to the Virginia Cavaliers for the first time in four all-time meetings. Miami's problems on offense continued, as the Hurricanes were only able to muster one offensive touchdown for the fourth consecutive game, while the Virginia offense picked apart the Miami defense. Jameel Sewell was the star of the Cavalier offense, connecting on 23 of 33 passes for 217 yards and running for a pair of touchdowns. Virginia also became the first team all season to rush for over 100 yards against Miami's defense, racking up 134 yards on the ground. Freshman running back Javarris James ran for 95 yards on 21 carries in defeat. Quarterback Kirby Freeman, making his second collegiate start after Kyle Wright underwent season-ending thumb injury, completed 11 of 18 passes for 152 yards, 1 touchdown, and 1 interception.

With the Hurricanes dropping to 5–6 (2–5 ACC), they would need to win their final game of the season against Boston College in order to become bowl eligible.

=== Boston College ===
	1	2	3	4	Total
#18 Boston College	7	7	0	0	14
Miami	0	10	7	0	17

In a Thanksgiving night primetime nationally televised game, Miami upset #18 Boston College at the Orange Bowl, 17–14, to win its 15th straight game against BC. The Hurricanes won behind a dominating defense that held the Eagles to under 200 yards of total offense and an offense that made just enough plays to overcome a 14–3 first half deficit. With the win, Miami became bowl eligible and denied BC a potential berth in the ACC Championship Game. The win was Miami's first of the year over a ranked opponent.

The game was played on the 22nd anniversary of the immortal "Hail Flutie" game, which was the last time Boston College defeated Miami.

=== MPC Computers Bowl vs. Nevada ===
	1	2	3	4	Total
Nevada	2	9	3	6	20
Miami	7	7	7	0	21

On November 29, 2006, Miami accepted an invitation to play against the Nevada Wolf Pack in the MPC Computers Bowl at Bronco Stadium in Boise, Idaho on December 31. Playing in 20 degree temperatures, quarterback Kirby Freeman completed 11 of 19 passes for 272 yards and led Miami to a 21–20 victory in coach Larry Coker's final game. Freeman, who also rushed for a touchdown, was named the game's Most Valuable Player. The win was clinched when Nevada quarterback Jeff Rowe was intercepted by Chavez Grant at the Miami 33 yard line with :18 remaining in the game. After the game, Coker was carried off the field by his players.

The win improved Miami's record to 7–6, making the 2006 campaign Miami's ninth straight winning season.

== Bryan Pata murder ==
Defensive tackle Bryan Pata was shot and killed on November 7, 2006. Pata was murdered at The Colony apartment complex in Kendall by an unknown assailant some time around 7:30 pm. The Miami-Dade Police Department declined to release further information about the specific circumstances of the shooting until they finished interviewing witnesses; the death was ruled a homicide.

Pata was the fourth Miami football player to die in the past 10 years. Linebacker Marlin Barnes and a female companion were bludgeoned to death in Barnes' on-campus apartment in 1996 by the woman's jealous ex-lover. In 2002, linebacker Chris Campbell was killed in a car accident. A car accident in 2003 also claimed the life of safety Al Blades.

Pata was described by friends and acquaintances as a "Christian" with a friendly, outgoing personality. Pata, who was projected to be a third-round selection in the 2007 NFL draft, also harbored dreams of one day possibly joining the FBI when his football career was over.

== Post–season ==
With the Hurricanes finishing the regular season at 6–6, the 2006 season proved to be one of the worst for the program in the past thirty years. The fall of Miami, which established itself as one of the most successful college football programs of the past twenty five years, was one of the biggest stories in collegiate football in 2006.

The season was the culmination of a gradual decline for the program since it won the national championship in 2001. In each following year, Miami appeared to have taken a step back in terms of national stature and its overall record, going from an undefeated national championship in 2001 to a national championship game loss in 2002 to a two-loss season in 2003 to back-to-back three loss seasons in 2004 and 2005, and a six-loss season in 2006. The team, which had the longest current streak of being ranked in the AP Poll, fell from the AP Top 25 in 2006 for the first time in 10 seasons.

Most noticeable during the decline were the mounting losses to mediocre programs, the increase in home losses, and a persistently anemic offense.

Only a late season win over Boston College ensured that Miami would finish the season bowl eligible. Since 1983, Miami had failed to play in a bowl game just twice: in 1995, when the program served a one-year bowl suspension, and in 1997, when the Hurricanes, hampered by NCAA scholarship sanctions, finished just 5–6.

Considerable speculation about Larry Coker's job status began to swirl after Miami's loss to Louisville in the third game of the season, which only intensified after the midseason brawl against FIU and the team's four-game losing streak late in the season.

As expected, Coker was dismissed on November 24, 2006, the morning after his Hurricanes closed the regular season with a 17–14 upset win over #18 Boston College. Coker would coach the team in its bowl game. As part of the terms of his contract, Coker would receive a buyout in the neighborhood of $2 to $3 million.

=== Head coaching search ===
In the aftermath of Coker's firing, a number of prominent college head coaches were speculated as potential candidates for the Miami head coaching job, including South Carolina head coach Steve Spurrier, former Wisconsin head coach Barry Alvarez, and Rutgers head coach Greg Schiano. Schiano, a former defensive coordinator at Miami, was reported to be the university's top choice. Schiano discussed the position with Miami Athletic Director Paul Dee, but subsequently removed his name from further consideration. Speculation ran high around Texas Tech head coach Mike Leach, who was one of only three coaches publicly confirmed as a candidate for the job, but Leach fell out of consideration after an interview with Dee.

After an intensive two-week head coaching search, Miami opted to stay in the family and promoted its highly regarded defensive coordinator Randy Shannon to the position of head coach on December 8, 2006. Shannon, who played linebacker at Miami from 1985 through 1988, became just the sixth African-American head coach in NCAA Division I-A football at the time. Shannon took over recruiting duties immediately, but expressed his desire for fired head coach Larry Coker to stay on and coach the team one final time in its season-ending bowl game against Nevada.

== Awards and honors ==
=== All-ACC ===
==== First Team ====
- Calais Campbell, DE
- Greg Olsen, TE
- Kenny Phillips, SS

==== Second Team ====
- Kareem Brown, DT
- Brandon Meriweather, S/CB

=== Jack Harding University of Miami MVP Award ===
- Calais Campbell, DE
