= 2006 ACC Championship Game =

2006 Dr Pepper ACC Championship Game
- Conference Championship
Wake Forest Demon Deacons	Georgia Tech Yellow Jackets
(10–2)	(9–3)
9	6
Head coach: Jim Grobe	Head coach: Chan Gailey
AP / Coaches / BCS; 16 / 16 / 17	AP / Coaches / BCS; 23 / 22 / 22
	1	2	3	4	Total
Wake Forest	0	3	0	6	9
Georgia Tech	3	0	0	3	6
- Date: December 2, 2006
- Season: 2006
- Stadium: Alltel Stadium
- Location: Jacksonville, Florida
- MVP: K Sam Swank, Wake Forest
- Favorite: Georgia Tech by 3
- Referee: Ron Cherry
- Halftime show: Dr Pepper "Million Dollar Throw"
- Attendance: 62,850

United States TV coverage
- Network: ABC
- Announcers: Brad Nessler, Bob Griese, Paul Maguire, and Bonnie Bernstein
- Nielsen ratings: 4.0

The 2006 Dr Pepper ACC Championship Game featured the Georgia Tech Yellow Jackets and the Wake Forest Demon Deacons in a regular-season American football game to determine the champion of the Atlantic Coast Conference. Wake Forest defeated Georgia Tech by a 9–6 score to win its first ACC football championship since 1970 and its second in school history. The game was held at Alltel Stadium (now known as EverBank Stadium) in Jacksonville, Florida and was the concluding game of the regular season for each team.

Neither team was highly regarded at the beginning of the 2006 season, but each team outperformed expectations to earn the right to play in the conference championship game, which was the second in the conference's history. Wake Forest, the Atlantic Division representative, earned a 10–2 record behind redshirt freshman quarterback Riley Skinner, who won the ACC's rookie of the year award. Wake defeated tough ACC opponents Florida State and 16th-ranked Boston College to win the Atlantic Division. Georgia Tech, led by junior All-America wide receiver Calvin Johnson, defeated 11th-ranked Virginia Tech and North Carolina en route to winning the Coastal Division and a spot in the championship game.

Low attendance and poor weather marred the contest, which kicked off amid rain and fog. Defense dominated from the beginning, as Georgia Tech took a 3–0 lead in the first quarter. Wake Forest evened the score before halftime, however, and the two teams headed into the second half tied at 3–3. After a scoreless third quarter, Georgia Tech took a 6–3 lead early in the fourth quarter. After Tech quarterback Reggie Ball threw a critical interception, Wake Forest was able to tie the game, then take a 9–6 lead. With time running out, Wake's defense denied Georgia Tech a game-winning score, and Wake Forest clinched the win.

All the scoring in the game came via five field goals, and Wake Forest's kicker, Sam Swank, was named the game's most valuable player. By virtue of its victory, Wake Forest earned its first ACC football championship since 1970 and was awarded a bid to the 2007 Orange Bowl. Georgia Tech's loss and second-place ACC finish earned it a position in the 2007 Gator Bowl. Following the conclusion of each team's bowl game, numerous players from both teams were selected in the 2007 NFL draft.

== Selection process ==
2006 Atlantic Coast Conference football standings
	Conf.			Overall
Team	W		L	W		L
Atlantic Division
No. 18 Wake Forest x$	6	–	2	11	–	3
No. 20 Boston College	5	–	3	10	–	3
Maryland	5	–	3	9	–	4
Clemson	5	–	3	8	–	5
Florida State	3	–	5	7	–	6
NC State	2	–	6	3	–	9
Coastal Division
Georgia Tech x	7	–	1	9	–	5
No. 19 Virginia Tech	6	–	2	10	–	3
Virginia	4	–	4	5	–	7
Miami (FL)	3	–	5	7	–	6
North Carolina	2	–	6	3	–	9
Duke	0	–	8	0	–	12
Championship: Wake Forest 9, Georgia Tech 6
$ – BCS representative as conference champion; x – Division champion/co-champions; Rankings from AP Poll

The ACC Championship Game matches the winner of the Coastal and Atlantic Divisions of the Atlantic Coast Conference. A conference championship game was added in 2005, as a result of the league's expansion the previous year, adding former Big East members Miami, Virginia Tech, and Boston College. With the addition of Boston College, the ACC consisted of 12 teams, allowing it to hold a conference championship game under NCAA rules.

Florida State defeated Virginia Tech, 27–22 in the first ACC Championship game. Following the 2005 game, the ACC requested that ABC schedule the 2006 contest for the afternoon in order to maximize television ratings. Heading into the 2006 college football season, Florida State and Miami were picked in the annual ACC pre-season media poll as favorites to appear in the 2006 ACC Championship Game. Georgia Tech received the third-most votes on the Coastal Division side of the poll, while Wake Forest was picked to finish last in the Atlantic Division.

=== Georgia Tech ===
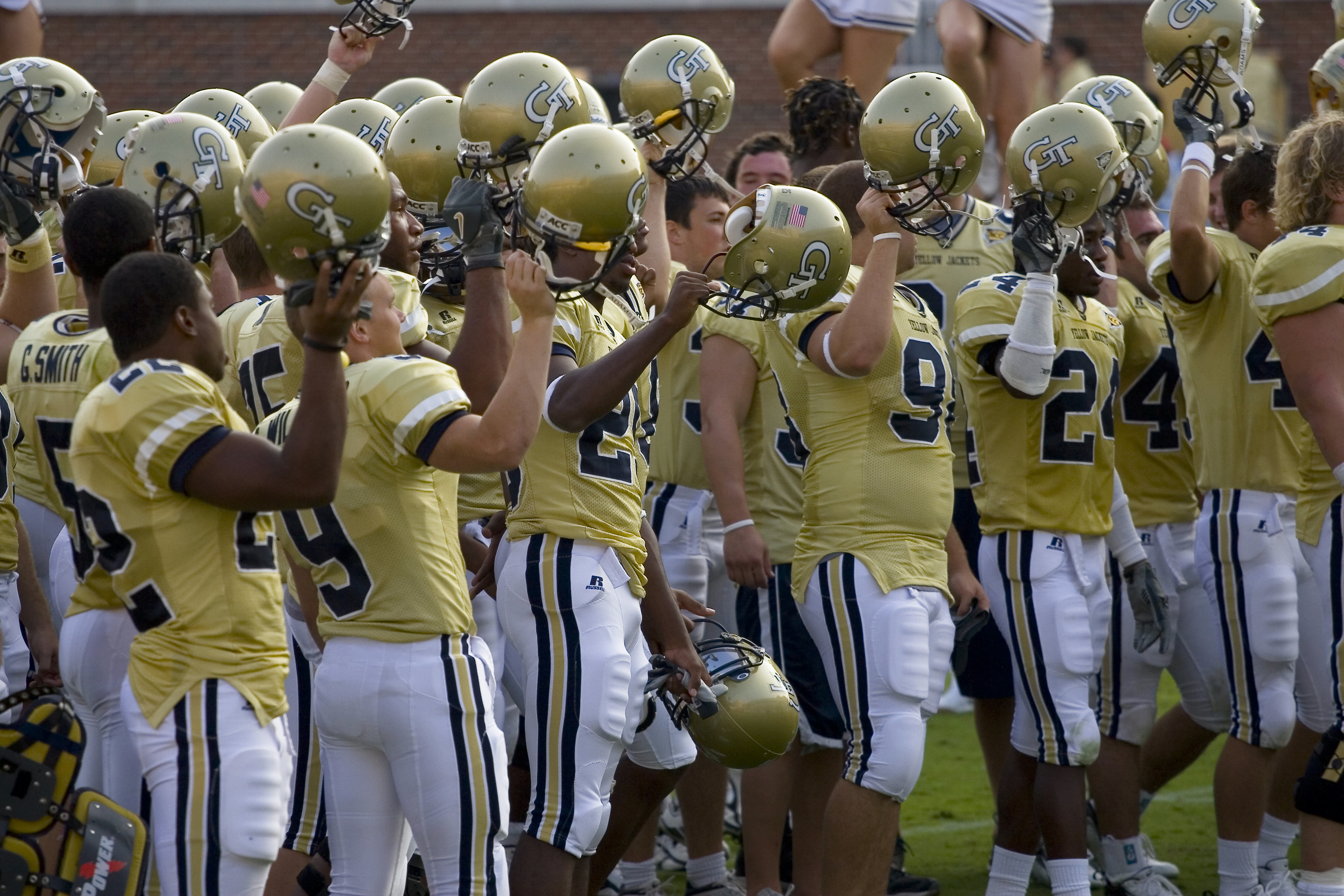
Georgia Tech players sing the school's fight song.

Georgia Tech's 2006 season began with a tough game against No. 2 Notre Dame. Though the Yellow Jackets lost 14–10, they took an early 10–0 lead over heavily favored Notre Dame until the Fighting Irish scored 14 unanswered points to win the game. Tech bounced back from the narrow loss by winning five straight games, including a 38–27 victory in Blacksburg, Virginia against the No. 11 Virginia Tech Hokies, who would later go on to finish second in the division.

Heading into the seventh game of the season, Georgia Tech was 5-1 and had an undefeated 3–0 record in conference play. At No. 12 Clemson, however, Tech suffered its first conference loss and largest loss of the season, losing 31–7. Tech wide receiver Calvin Johnson failed to record a reception for the first time in his career during the loss. Tech followed the loss by winning its next four games. Following the third win, a 7-0 shutout of North Carolina, Tech clinched the Coastal Division championship and a bid to the ACC Championship Game.

After clinching a spot in the championship game, Tech defeated ACC opponent Duke, then prepared for a game against traditional rival Georgia before heading to Jacksonville for the ACC championship. In the game against Georgia, the No. 16 Yellow Jackets were upset by the unranked Bulldogs, who intercepted Tech quarterback Reggie Ball twice and held him to just 42 passing yards in the game. Georgia's victory marked the sixth consecutive victory in the rivalry and sent Tech into the ACC Championship Game on a down note.

=== Wake Forest ===
Wake Forest began the 2006 season on September 2 with a home game against Big East conference opponent Syracuse. Wake defeated Syracuse 20–10, but starting quarterback Benjamin Mauk suffered a season-ending injury when he fractured his arm, dislocated his shoulder, and suffered a torn labrum. Backup quarterback Riley Skinner replaced Mauk in the game, and would serve as Wake's starting quarterback for the remainder of the season.

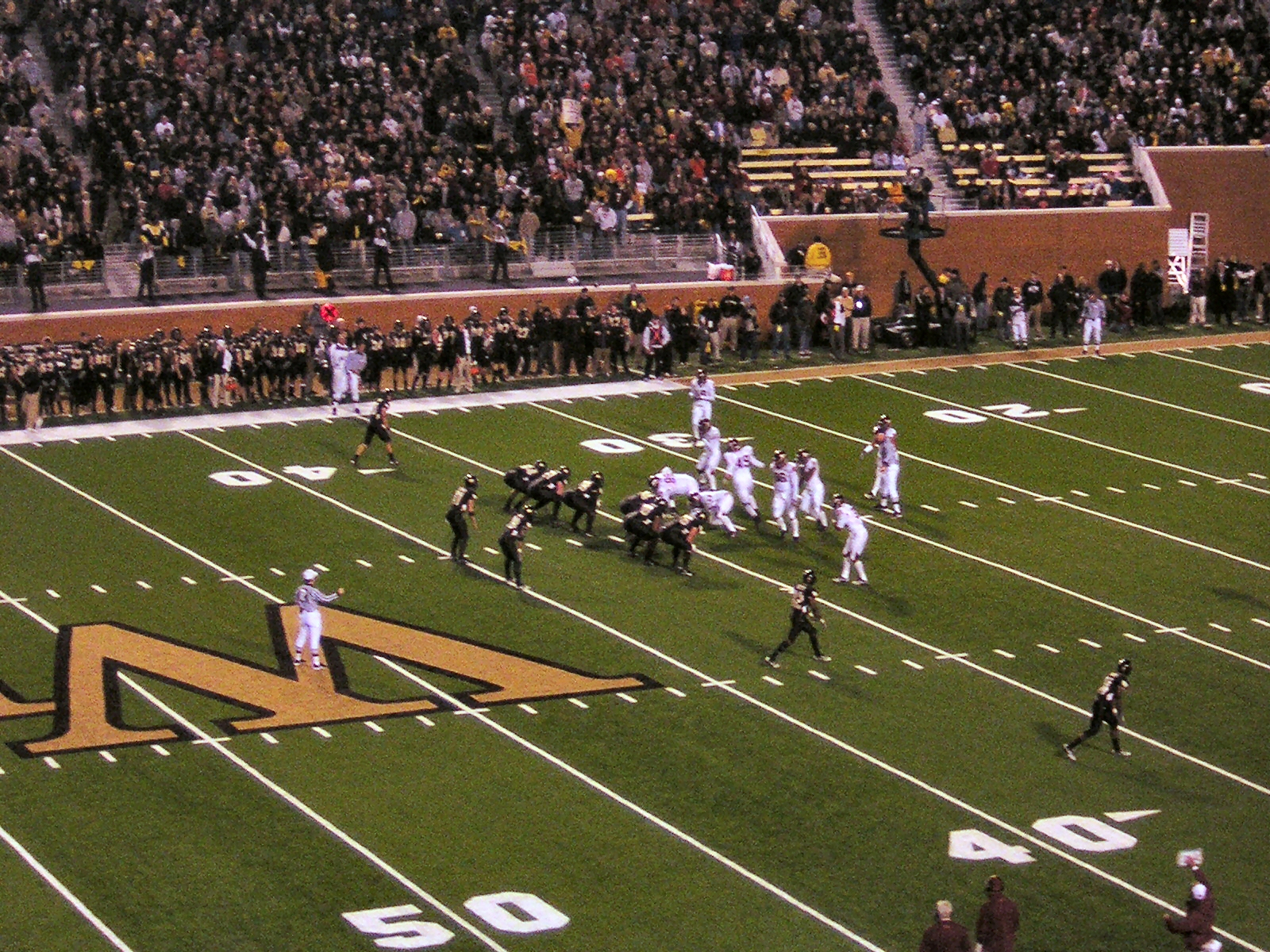
Wake Forest (black uniforms) prepares for a play against the Virginia Tech Hokies.

The Deacons struggled in their second game, beating ACC rival Duke 14–13 by blocking a Duke field goal on the final play of the game. Following the close call against Duke, however, Wake Forest went on to win its next three games. A 34–14 win over Football Championship Subdivision Liberty University gave Wake its first 5–0 start since 1987.

In its sixth game of the season, Wake Forest suffered its first loss. Against the No. 15 Clemson Tigers, Wake gave up 24 points in the fourth quarter to give Clemson a 27–17 victory. The Demon Deacons recovered quickly from the loss and proceeded to begin another winning streak, this time against ACC opponents. Over the next four weeks, Wake defeated North Carolina State, North Carolina, No. 16 Boston College, and Florida State. The 30–0 win over Florida State marked several milestones for the Deacons. The win marked the first time in school history that the Deacons had earned nine wins in a single season. In addition, Wake Forest recorded its first win against Florida State in Tallahassee since 1959 and became the first team to shut out a Bobby Bowden-coached Florida State team in Doak Campbell Stadium. The game continues to be celebrated in Tallahassee, as it marked the end of the Jeff Bowden era.

In its next game, however, the Demon Deacons fell at home to the No. 19 Virginia Tech Hokies, 27–6. The Hokies would later go on to finish second in the Coastal Division and earn a bid to the 2007 Chick-fil-A Bowl. Wake Forest recovered from its second loss of the season to earn a 38–24 victory against Maryland—its first since 1998—clinching the Atlantic Division championship and earning a bid to the ACC Championship Game. Wake became the first team in ACC history to go 6–0 in ACC road games, and extended the school record for wins in a season to 10.

== Pre-game buildup ==
In the weeks leading up to the game, the point most emphasized in media coverage of the game was that Wake Forest had not won an ACC championship in football since 1970. The point spread for the game was relatively constant, with spread bettors favoring Georgia Tech by a single point.

=== Offensive matchups ===
==== Georgia Tech ====
Georgia Tech wide receiver Calvin Johnson, who was voted the preseason ACC Player of the Year, was expected to do well in the ACC Championship Game. Johnson recorded 59 receptions for 889 yards and 13 touchdowns heading into the championship game. On November 29, Johnson was named the ACC Player of the Year (POY), fulfilling the expectations set when he earned preseason player of the year honors. On the day after Johnson earned ACC POY honors, he was named to the Rivals.com All-America team, an annual selection of the best players at each position in the United States. Johnson was the first Tech player in over a decade to be selected as an All-American in two consecutive seasons.

Tech quarterback Reggie Ball was not nearly as acclaimed. Despite leading the ACC with 20 touchdown passes and being named an All-ACC honorable mention, there were doubts about Ball's effectiveness. Since starting at quarterback in his freshman year, Ball went 0–4 against Tech rival Georgia, and was excoriated for his inconsistency. After suffering a game-losing fumble against the Bulldogs, commentators questioned how well Ball would recover from the setback before the ACC Championship Game.

Supporting Ball and Johnson were a corps of capable receivers including James Johnson and Greg Smith. James Johnson was Tech's second-leading receiver behind Calvin Johnson, and recorded over 500 receiving yards heading into the ACC championship. During Tech's game against Virginia Tech, James caught a 49-yard touchdown pass for the game's first points. Smith was Tech's fifth-leading receiver in 2006, but had several key plays (including two touchdown receptions) in Georgia Tech's game against the Duke Blue Devils.

On the ground, the Georgia Tech rushing attack was led by Tashard Choice. Choice was the leading rusher in the ACC, averaging over 100 yards per game. Against North Carolina State, Choice recorded 164 rushing yards on 34 carries, earning what was then a single-game career high in rushing yards. In the days before the ACC championship, Choice was named to the second-team All-ACC team, and was considered to be a threat on offense against Wake Forest.

==== Wake Forest ====
Wake Forest, which had begun the season with Benjamin Mauk as its starting quarterback, ended the season with redshirt freshman Riley Skinner filling the position. Despite having almost no experience starting at quarterback before the season, Skinner was named the ACC's rookie of the year. Skinner led the ACC in completion percentage, passing efficiency, and interception rate. In addition, Skinner set 10 new single-season passing records at Wake Forest during the 2006 season. In the days before the ACC Championship Game, Skinner was named to the second-team All-ACC team, joining eight other teammates selected to one of the two All-ACC teams.

Two of the other Deacons selected for All-ACC honors were senior tackle Steve Vallos and junior center Steve Justice, both of whom were key components of the Wake Forest offensive line. Vallos had been considered for the Lombardi Award and Outland Trophy and won first-team Associated Press All-America honors after the championship game. Center Steve Justice started all 14 games during Wake Forest's 2006 season, and participated in 98 percent of the Deacons' offensive plays.

Wake Forest also boasted one of the nation's best punters and placekickers, Sam Swank. Swank was one of the team's nine 2006 All-ACC selections, and performed extremely well during the season. Swank led the Deacons in points scored, and was successful on five of seven kicks from beyond 50 yards during the season. Swank was a finalist for the Ray Guy Award and Lou Groza Award, which go to the nation's best punter and placekicker, respectively. Following the championship Game, Swank was named to the ESPN and Sports Illustrated first-team All-America teams.

=== Defensive matchups ===
==== Georgia Tech ====
Heading into the game, Georgia Tech had the 11th best rushing defense in FBS football. That defense was led statistically by linebacker Philip Wheeler, considered by many to be one of the nation's best blitzing linebackers. In the days leading up to the championship game, Wheeler was named to the Rivals.com All-America team. In addition, Wheeler was a second-team All-ACC selection and a two-time ACC Defensive Player of the Week.

On the defensive line, Georgia Tech featured defensive tackle Joe Anoa'i, now better known by his WWE identity of Roman Reigns, and defensive end Adamm Oliver. Anoa'i, a first-team All-ACC selection, headed into the ACC Championship having earned six tackles and 2.5 tackles for loss in Tech's previous game against Georgia. Anoa'i also forced and recovered a Georgia fumble that eventually led to a Tech field goal. Adamm Oliver was a second-team All-ACC selection who was fourth on the team in total tackles and second on the team in tackles for loss. Oliver created the game-winning play for the Yellow Jackets against Miami when he forced a fumble that set up the game-clinching touchdown. Georgia Tech also had several important defensive backs. Safety Jamal Lewis was a first-team All-ACC selection and the team's leading tackler. During the Yellow Jackets' game against Samford University, Lewis returned an interception 97 yards for a touchdown. The return was the fourth-longest in Georgia Tech history and was the longest since a 102-yard return in 1969.

==== Wake Forest ====
The Wake Forest defense was led by All-America honorable mention linebacker Jon Abbate. Abbate, who was a first-team All-ACC selection, was the team's leading tackler and earned the second-most tackles in the ACC during the season. Safety Josh Gattis was another star on the Wake defense. A first-team All-ACC selection, Gattis was the only player in the ACC to earn 70 tackles and five interceptions. On the defensive line, defensive end Patrick Ghee stood out. An honorable mention All-ACC selection, Ghee ranked fifth on the team in tackles and had three interceptions.

== Game summary ==
The 2006 ACC Championship Game kicked off at Alltel Stadium in Jacksonville, Florida on December 2, 2006. The game was broadcast on ABC, and earned a 4.0 television rating. This figure was down slightly from the previous year's game, which earned a 5.1 rating. Brad Nessler, Bob Griese, Paul Maguire, and Bonnie Bernstein were selected to announce the game.

At kickoff, a light breeze was blowing from the northeast at 5 miles per hour (8.0 km/h), the air temperature was 59 °F (15 °C), and the weather was foggy with a light rain. Rain had been falling for several hours, turning the field into a muddy mess that would hinder play throughout the game. 62,850 tickets were sold for the game, and that number was given as the official attendance. Real attendance estimates range from 40,000 to 50,000, due to the poor weather and the fact that the stadium was half-empty through much of the game.

During the pre-game coin toss, a member of the Wounded Warrior Project, which rehabilitates wounded American war veterans, threw the ceremonial coin. Georgia Tech won the coin toss and elected to receive the ball to begin the game. After Georgia Tech made its selection, Wake Forest elected to defend the north end zone to begin the game, forcing Georgia Tech's kickers to kick into the wind during the first and fourth quarters.

=== First quarter ===
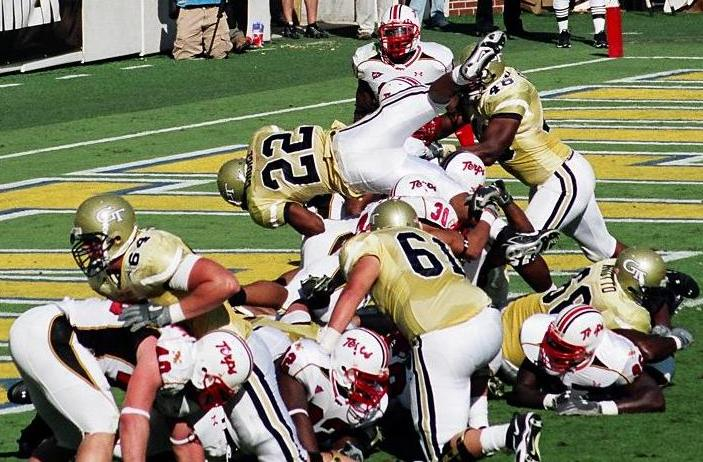
Tashard Choice, seen here diving into the end zone against Maryland, earned his longest carry of the game in the first quarter.

Wake Forest kicked off to begin the game, and Georgia Tech returned the kick to its own 24-yard line. On the first play of the game, Tech running back Tashard Choice attempted a rush, but was stopped for a loss of one yard. The play set the tone for the rest of the game, which would be a hard-fought, low-scoring defensive struggle. After the loss, Choice broke free on the second play of the game for a 24-yard run and a first down. On the next two plays, the Georgia Tech offense used their passing attack as quarterback Reggie Ball completed two passes, driving the Yellowjackets into Wake Forest territory. Subsequent plays allowed Tech to penetrate the Wake Forest red zone, but there, the Demon Deacons' defense stiffened. Despite having a first down inside the Wake Forest 10-yard line, Georgia Tech did not cross the goal line. Denied a touchdown, Georgia Tech was forced to settle for a field goal attempt from kicker Travis Bell. Bell's kick was good, and with 9:59 remaining in the first quarter, Georgia Tech took a 3–0 lead.

Following Georgia Tech's post-score kickoff, Wake Forest received the ball, but failed to gain a first down. The Deacons' offense went three and out and was forced to punt. On Tech's next possession, they too had difficulty moving the football on offense. Though they picked up a first down off of a penalty on Wake Forest, they were unable to gain a first down by their own devices and were forced to punt the ball away.

The two teams traded possessions once more, and as the first quarter came to an end, Georgia Tech was in possession of the ball but was preparing to punt it away after yet another failure to pick up a first down.

=== Second quarter ===
Following the Georgia Tech punt, Wake Forest received the ball to begin the second quarter. Wake Forest, after a three and out, again punted the ball and Georgia Tech took over on offense. On their first full possession of the second quarter, Tech seemed to have more success moving the ball. Quarterback Reggie Ball picked up a first down running the ball, then completed a 22-yard pass to wide receiver Calvin Johnson, driving the Yellow Jackets inside Wake Forest territory. Once there, however, Wake Forest's defense stiffened. Ball was unable to complete two consecutive passes, and his third pass inside Wake Forest territory was intercepted.

Having regained the ball, Wake Forest answered Georgia Tech's drive with one of their own. Several Wake running backs rushed with the ball, but it was Wake Forest quarterback Riley Skinner who advanced the ball the most. He completed a 24-yard pass to Willie Idlette, then an eight-yard toss to Nate Morton. Inside Tech territory, Wake's offense stumbled. Skinner was sacked by a Tech defender, and kicker Sam Swank was sent into the game to attempt a 45-yard field goal. Swank's kick was no good, and with 7:26 remaining in the second quarter, Georgia Tech still had a 3–0 lead.

Taking over after the missed field goal, Georgia Tech was unable to gain a first down. After the Yellow Jackets punted the ball away, Wake Forest continued to have the increased offensive success they had shown in their previous drive. This time, it was running back Kenneth Moore who picked up the majority of the Deacons' yardage, as he carried the ball eight times during the drive. Toward the end of the drive, Wake Forest was assisted by a 10-yard penalty against the Yellow Jackets, which drove them inside Georgia Tech's red zone. There, however, Tech's defense stiffened. Despite having a first down at Tech's 10-yard line, Wake was unable to score a touchdown. Kicker Sam Swank again came into the game to attempt a field goal, and connected on a 19-yard field goal. The kick tied the score at 3–3 with just 58 seconds remaining in the first half.

With time in the half virtually exhausted, Georgia Tech elected to run down the clock and take the game into halftime tied, 3–3.

=== Third quarter ===
Because Georgia Tech received the ball to begin the game, Wake Forest received the ball to begin the second half. As in the first half, however, both teams' offenses were stifled by each team's defense. On its first possession of the second half, Wake Forest reached the Georgia Tech 48-yard line before being forced to punt.

Georgia Tech's first possession of the half was slightly more successful than Wake Forest's, as the Yellow Jackets drove inside the Deacons' 30-yard line on several passes from Reggie Ball. Again, however, the Tech defense stumbled. Facing a fourth down inside the Wake Forest red zone, Tech elected to attempt to convert the first down rather than punt the ball. Despite needing just one yard to gain another first down, Georgia Tech was stopped short of the line. The play was typical of the third quarter, which saw both teams fail to score.

Both Wake Forest and Georgia Tech mounted several drives into the other's territory, but were either stopped outside field goal range or attempted to convert a fourth down rather than kick the ball. As the quarter came to an end, the score remained tied 3–3, with neither team having scored a touchdown.

=== Fourth quarter ===
At the beginning of the fourth quarter, Georgia Tech was in possession of the ball, deep inside Wake Forest territory. Shortly after the quarter began, Tech failed to gain a needed first down in order to continue its drive. Instead of attempting to convert the fourth down—Tech had attempted and failed on two fourth-down conversions in the third quarter—Tech instead sent in kicker Travis Bell. Bell's 34-yard attempt sailed through the goalposts, and with 12:53 remaining in the game, Georgia Tech took a 6–3 lead.

After Georgia Tech's post-score kickoff, Wake Forest continued to struggle on offense. Quarterback Riley Skinner was sacked, threw an 18-yard completion, then three incomplete passes. Wake was forced to punt the ball away again, allowing the Yellow Jackets the possibility of expanding their lead. On Tech's first play after the punt, however, Reggie Ball's pass was intercepted, allowing Wake Forest another chance on offense. The play turned the momentum of the game in favor of Wake Forest, who proceeded to move the ball with slightly more effectiveness. During the Wake Forest drive, Skinner completed a 39-yard pass to John Tereshinski, who drove the Deacons inside Georgia Tech territory, where the drive continued. Though Wake Forest was forced to settle for a 33-yard field goal from kicker Sam Swank, the score tied the game at 6–6 with 7:59 remaining in the game.

Wake's post-score kickoff was downed in the end zone for a touchback. With time running down, Georgia Tech had a chance for a game-winning score if it could sustain a drive into Wake Forest territory from its own 20-yard line. The drive began with a promising 14-yard completion to Calvin Johnson, but after Reggie Ball threw three incomplete passes, Georgia Tech was forced to punt the ball back to Wake Forest. The Deacons, after getting the ball at their own 20-yard line, began a drive of their own. Riley Skinner completed his first four passes of the drive, including a long 45-yard strike to Willie Idlette for the longest play of the game. With a first down inside the Georgia Tech red zone, the Deacons seemed to be in perfect position for a potentially game-winning touchdown. But as had every other drive previous, Wake Forest's offense failed to cross the goal line. Sam Swank kicked a 22-yard field goal to give the Deacons a 9–6 lead, but Georgia Tech still had time for one final drive.

After receiving the Wake Forest kickoff, however, Georgia Tech's hopes were quickly deflated by three plays that resulted in negative yardage or no gain. Georgia Tech was forced into its final punt of the game, and Wake Forest received the ball and ran out the remaining time on the clock. Wake Forest won the 2006 ACC Championship Game by a 9–6 score.

== Statistical summary ==
Statistical comparison
	WF	GT
1st downs	16	18
Total yards	292	272
Passing yards	201	129
Rushing yards	91	143
Penalties	7–85	6–45
3rd down conversions	4–16	5–15
4th down conversions	1–1	0–3
Turnovers	0	2
Time of possession	34:12	25:48

Thanks to his performance in the game, Wake Forest placekicker Sam Swank was named the game's most valuable player. Swank was successful on three of his four field goal kicks during the game, kicking 19, 33, and 22-yard field goals while missing on a 45-yard attempt in the second quarter. The Demon Deacons' nine points—all of which were scored by Swank—were the least ever scored by the winning team in a Division I-A conference championship game.

Wake Forest quarterback Riley Skinner finished the game having completed 14 of his 25 pass attempts. He passed for 201 yards, one-fifth of which came on a single play during Wake Forest's final drive of the game. On the opposite side of the ball, Georgia Tech quarterback Reggie Ball completed just nine of his 29 passes. Two of Ball's passes were intercepted by Wake Forest defenders, and Ball accounted for just 129 passing yards.

The majority of Georgia Tech's offense came on the ground from running back Tashard Choice and from quarterback scrambles by Ball. Choice ran the ball 21 times, netting 100 yards. Ball was Tech's second-leading rusher, and picked up 46 yards on 15 different rushes. Eight different players carried the ball for Wake Forest, with Kenneth Moore and Willie Idlette picking up the majority of the yardage. Moore finished the game with 16 carries for 38 yards, while Idlette earned 35 yards on six different attempts. Half of Idlette's yards came on one 19-yard carry, and he also earned 73 receiving yards during the game to lead all Wake receivers.

On defense, Jon Abbate led all Wake Forest defenders with 15 total tackles. Abbate also earned two tackles for loss and a quarterback sack of Reggie Ball. Riley Swanson and Aaron Curry each caught an interception for Wake. Kenny Scott led the Georgia Tech defense statistically, earning eight total tackles, two tackles for loss, and one quarterback sack. Adamm Oliver finished with seven total tackles and one and a half tackles for loss.

== Post-game effects ==
With the victory, Wake Forest finished the regular season with an 11–2 record, breaking its previous team record for wins in a season. The 2006 ACC Championship was Wake's second championship in history, the first having come in 1970. Following the game, the Deacons' head coach, Jim Grobe, earned multiple national coach of the year honors for taking Wake to its first ACC championship in 36 years and taking the program from the worst in the ACC to the best in just one season.

Following the game, Wake Forest earned an automatic bid to the 2007 Orange Bowl as a reward for its status as ACC champion. Wake Forest faced the Louisville Cardinals in Dolphin Stadium, now known as Hard Rock Stadium, in Miami Gardens, Florida.

Georgia Tech's went to 9–3 with the loss. Tech was selected as a participant in the 2007 Gator Bowl as a reward for its second-place ACC finish.

Tech's selection to the Gator Bowl was a controversial one. Because both the Gator Bowl and ACC Championship game were held in Jacksonville, Georgia Tech would be forced to play two games in Jacksonville in four weeks. The team, league, and bowl officials were concerned that fact would hurt attendance.

== See also ==
- List of Atlantic Coast Conference football champions
- Glossary of American football

Other conference championship games

- American Athletic Conference Championship Game (since 2015)
- Big Ten Championship Game (since 2011)
- Big 12 Championship Game (1996–2010, 2017–present)
- Conference USA Championship Game (since 2005)
- MAC Championship Game (since 1997)
- Mountain West Championship Game (since 2013)
- Pac-12 Championship Game (since 2012)
- SEC Championship Game (since 1992)
- Sun Belt Championship Game (since 2018)
- WAC Championship Game (last held in 1998)
