= 2006 Virginia Cavaliers football team =

American college football season

2006 Virginia Cavaliers football
- Conference: Atlantic Coast Conference
- Coastal
- Record: 5–7 (4–4 ACC)
- Head coach: Al Groh (6th season)
- Offensive coordinator: Mike Groh (1st season)
- Offensive scheme: West Coast
- Defensive coordinator: Mike London (1st season)
- Base defense: 3–4
- Home stadium: Scott Stadium (Capacity: 61,500)

Uniform

2006 Atlantic Coast Conference football standings
	Conf.			Overall
Team	W		L	W		L
Atlantic Division
No. 18 Wake Forest x$	6	–	2	11	–	3
No. 20 Boston College	5	–	3	10	–	3
Maryland	5	–	3	9	–	4
Clemson	5	–	3	8	–	5
Florida State	3	–	5	7	–	6
NC State	2	–	6	3	–	9
Coastal Division
Georgia Tech x	7	–	1	9	–	5
No. 19 Virginia Tech	6	–	2	10	–	3
Virginia	4	–	4	5	–	7
Miami (FL)	3	–	5	7	–	6
North Carolina	2	–	6	3	–	9
Duke	0	–	8	0	–	12
Championship: Wake Forest 9, Georgia Tech 6
$ – BCS representative as conference champion; x – Division champion/co-champions; Rankings from AP Poll

The 2006 Virginia Cavaliers football team represented the University of Virginia in the 2006 NCAA Division I FBS football season. The team's head coach was Al Groh. They played their home games at Scott Stadium in Charlottesville, Virginia.

== Schedule ==
Date	Time	Opponent	Site	TV	Result	Attendance	Source
September 2	7:00 pm	at Pittsburgh*	Heinz Field; Pittsburgh, PA	ESPNU	L 13–38	46,758	
September 9	3:30 pm	Wyoming*	Scott Stadium; Charlottesville, VA		W 13–12 ^{OT}	60,429	
September 16	3:30 pm	Western Michigan*^{†}	Scott Stadium; Charlottesville, VA	ESPN360	L 10–17	59,679	
September 21	7:30 pm	at Georgia Tech	Bobby Dodd Stadium; Atlanta, GA	ESPN	L 7–24	51,081	
September 30	12:00 pm	at Duke	Wallace Wade Stadium; Durham, NC	LFS	W 37–0	19,241	
October 7	3:30 pm	at East Carolina*	Dowdy–Ficklen Stadium; Greenville, NC	CSTV	L 21–31	35,541	
October 14	3:30 pm	Maryland	Scott Stadium; Charlottesville, VA (rivalry)	ESPN360	L 26–28	59,367	
October 19	7:30 pm	North Carolina	Scott Stadium; Charlottesville, VA (South's Oldest Rivalry)	ESPN	W 23–0	56,632	
October 28	12:00 pm	NC State	Scott Stadium; Charlottesville, VA	LFS	W 14–7	55,730	
November 4	12:00 pm	at Florida State	Doak Campbell Stadium; Tallahassee, FL	LFS	L 0–33	82,804	
November 18	12:00 pm	Miami	Scott Stadium; Charlottesville, VA	LFS	W 17–7	54,552	
November 25	12:00 pm	at No. 14 Virginia Tech	Lane Stadium; Blacksburg, VA (rivalry)	LFS	L 0–17	66,233	
*Non-conference game; ^{†}Homecoming; Rankings from Coaches' Poll released prior to the game; All times are in Eastern time

== Personnel ==
2006 Virginia Cavaliers football team roster
Players
Coaches
Offense

Pos.	#	Name	Class
QB	6	Marc Verica	Fr
QB	10	Jameel Sewell	Fr
QB	11	Christian Olsen	Sr
QB	13	Kevin McCabe	Jr
C	77	Ian-Yates Cunningham	Jr
G	79	Gordie Sammis	Sr

Defense

Pos.	#	Name	Class

Special teams

Pos.	#	Name	Class

Head coach

- Al Groh

Coordinators/assistant coaches

Legend

- (C) Team captain
- (S) Suspended
- (I) Ineligible
- Injured
- Redshirt

Roster

== Coaching staff ==
Position	Name
Head coach:	Al Groh
Defensive coordinator/defensive line coach:	Mike London
Offensive coordinator/quarterbacks coach /recruiting coordinator:	Mike Groh
Assistant head coach for offense/wide receivers:	John Garrett
Assistant head coach/defensive backs coach:	Steve Bernstein
Special teams coordinator/linebackers coach	Bob Diaco
Defensive assistant coach/assistant defensive line coach	Levern Belin
Running game coordinator/offensive line coach	Dave Borbely
Assistant special teams coordinator/running backs coach	Anthony Poindexter
Tight ends coach/assistant recruiting coordinator	Bob Price
Graduate assistant offense	Kase Luzar
Graduate assistant defense	Rich Yahner
Head strength coach	Evan Marcus
Director of football video operations	Luke Goldstein
