= 2006 Boston College Eagles football team =

American college football season

2006 Boston College Eagles football
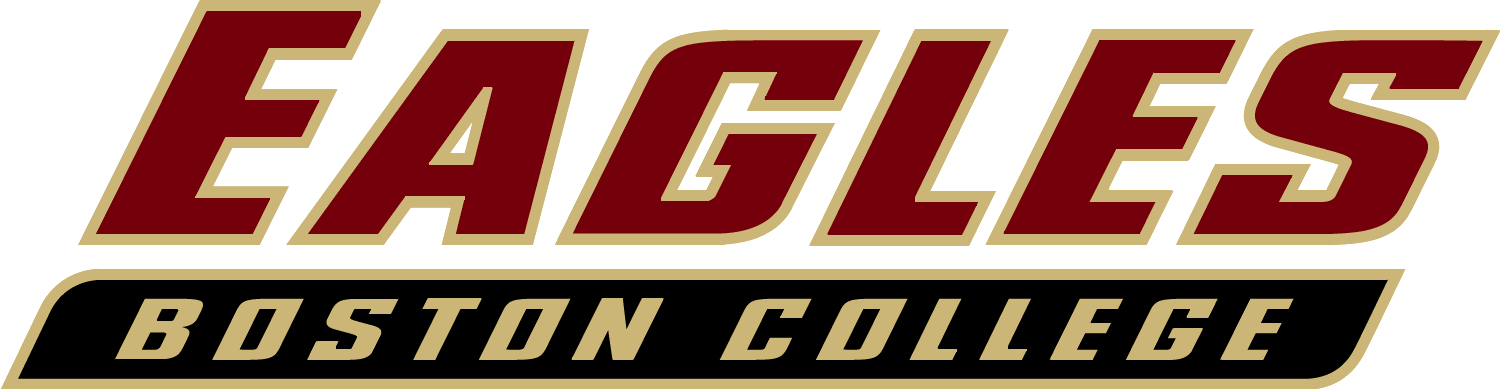

Meineke Car Care Bowl champion

Meineke Car Care Bowl, W 25–24 vs. Navy
- Conference: Atlantic Coast Conference
- Atlantic Division

Ranking
- Coaches: No. 20
- AP: No. 20
- Record: 10–3 (5–3 ACC)
- Head coach: Tom O'Brien (10th season; regular season); Frank Spaziani (interim; bowl game)
- Offensive coordinator: Dana Bible (8th season)
- Offensive scheme: Pro-style
- Defensive coordinator: Frank Spaziani (8th season)
- Base defense: 4–3
- Captains: Josh Beekman; Jo-Lonn Dunbar; Matt Ryan
- Home stadium: Alumni Stadium

2006 Atlantic Coast Conference football standings
	Conf.			Overall
Team	W		L	W		L
Atlantic Division
No. 18 Wake Forest x$	6	–	2	11	–	3
No. 20 Boston College	5	–	3	10	–	3
Maryland	5	–	3	9	–	4
Clemson	5	–	3	8	–	5
Florida State	3	–	5	7	–	6
NC State	2	–	6	3	–	9
Coastal Division
Georgia Tech x	7	–	1	9	–	5
No. 19 Virginia Tech	6	–	2	10	–	3
Virginia	4	–	4	5	–	7
Miami (FL)	3	–	5	7	–	6
North Carolina	2	–	6	3	–	9
Duke	0	–	8	0	–	12
Championship: Wake Forest 9, Georgia Tech 6
$ – BCS representative as conference champion; x – Division champion/co-champions; Rankings from AP Poll

The 2006 Boston College Eagles football team represented Boston College during the 2006 NCAA Division I FBS football season. Boston College competed as a member of the Atlantic Coast Conference. The Eagles played their home games at Alumni Stadium in Chestnut Hill, Massachusetts, which has been their home stadium since 1957.

== Schedule ==
Date	Time	Opponent	Rank	Site	TV	Result	Attendance
August 31	6:00 p.m.	at Central Michigan*		Kelly/Shorts Stadium; Mount Pleasant, MI	ESPN2	W 31–24	25,418
September 9	3:30 p.m.	No. 18 Clemson		Alumni Stadium; Chestnut Hill, MA (rivalry)	ABC	W 34–33 ^{2OT}	44,500
September 16	12:00 p.m.	BYU*	No. 23	Alumni Stadium; Chestnut Hill, MA	ESPN2	W 30–23 ^{2OT}	40,233
September 23	8:00 p.m.	at NC State	No. 20	Carter–Finley Stadium; Raleigh, NC	ESPN2	L 15–17	57,583
September 30	1:00 p.m.	Maine*		Alumni Stadium; Chestnut Hill, MA	ESPN360	W 22–0	41,162
October 12	7:30 p.m.	No. 22 Virginia Tech		Alumni Stadium; Chestnut Hill, MA (rivalry)	ESPN	W 22–3	44,500
October 21	3:30 p.m.	at Florida State	No. 22	Doak Campbell Stadium; Tallahassee, FL	ABC	W 24–19	83,043
October 28	1:00 p.m.	Buffalo*	No. 18	Alumni Stadium; Chestnut Hill, MA	ESPN360	W 41–0	14,682
November 4	7:00 p.m.	at No. 22 Wake Forest	No. 16	Groves Stadium; Winston-Salem, NC	ESPN2	L 14–21	32,633
November 11	7:00 p.m.	Duke	No. 22	Alumni Stadium; Chestnut Hill, MA	ESPNU	W 28–3	42,326
November 18	12:00 p.m.	No. 21 Maryland	No. 20	Alumni Stadium; Chestnut Hill, MA	ESPN	W 38–16	44,500
November 23	7:30 p.m.	at Miami (FL)	No. 18	Miami Orange Bowl; Miami, FL	ESPN	L 14–17	23,308
December 30	1:00 p.m.	vs. Navy*	No. 23	Bank of America Stadium; Charlotte, NC (Meineke Car Care Bowl)	ESPN	W 25–24	52,303
*Non-conference game; Rankings from AP Poll released prior to the game; All times are in Eastern time

== Rankings ==
Ranking movements Legend: ██ Increase in ranking ██ Decrease in ranking — = Not ranked RV = Received votes
	Week															
Poll	Pre	1	2	3	4	5	6	7	8	9	10	11	12	13	14	Final
AP	RV	RV	23	20	RV	25	RV	22	18	16	22	20	18	25	23	20
Coaches Poll	RV	RV	25	21	25	RV	25	21	17	16	22	20	18	25	23	20
Harris	Not released				25	25	25	21	17	16	22	20	18	25	23	Not released
BCS	Not released							20	17	15	22	20	18	—	24	Not released

== Drafted Players (2007 NFL Draft) ==
2007	3	3	67	James Marten	Dallas Cowboys	T
2007	4	31	130	Josh Beekman	Chicago Bears	G
