= Chris Ellis (American football) =

American football player and coach (born 1985)

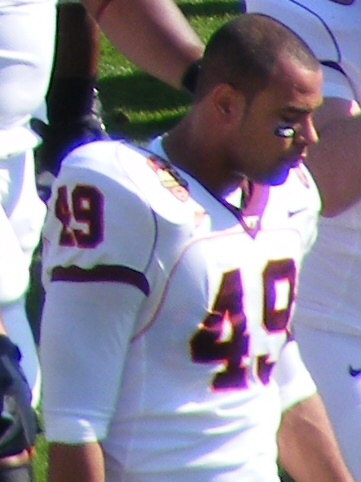
- Ellis with Virginia Tech in 2007

Richmond Spiders
- Title: Defensive ends coach

Personal information
- Born: February 11, 1985 (age 41); Hampton, Virginia, U.S.
- Listed height: 6 ft 4 in (1.93 m)
- Listed weight: 260 lb (118 kg)

Career information
- High school: Bethel (Hampton)
- College: Virginia Tech (2004-2007)
- NFL draft: 2008: 3rd round, 72nd overall pick

Career history

Playing
- Buffalo Bills (2008–2010); Pittsburgh Steelers (2010–2011)*; Saskatchewan Roughriders (2012)
- * Offseason or practice squad member only

Coaching
- Frostburg State (2013) Intern; Christopher Newport (2014–2016) Defensive line coach; New Hampshire (2017–2018) Defensive ends coach; BC Lions (2019) Defensive line coach; Christopher Newport (2020–2021) Defensive line coach; Richmond (2022–present) Defensive ends coach

Awards and highlights
- First-team All-ACC (2007)

Career NFL statistics
- Total tackles: 13
- Sacks: 1
- Stats at Pro Football Reference
- Stats at CFL.ca (archive)

Chris Ellis (born February 11, 1985) is an American college football coach and former defensive lineman. He is the defensive ends coach for the University of Richmond, a position he has held since 2022. He was selected by the Buffalo Bills in the third round of the 2008 NFL draft. He played college football for the Virginia Tech Hokies, where he was a first-team All-ACC selection. He was also a member of the Pittsburgh Steelers and Saskatchewan Roughriders.

== Early life ==
Ellis was ranked 66th on SuperPrep's Elite 100 list following his senior season when he led Bethel with 50 tackles - seven for loss - and 10 sacks. He was named an All-American by both SuperPrep and PrepStar as a defensive lineman. He was named to the VHSCA All-Eastern Region honorable mention squad as a defensive end. He posted 75 tackles and 15 sacks as a junior.

== College career ==
The most experienced of Tech's defensive linemen when he totaled 53 tackles, 9 for a loss, and 8.5 sacks and ranked second in QB hurries (15) and caused a fumble that was returned for a touchdown against Kent State. In 2006, he closed out the season with 38 tackles (8.5 for losses) and 4.5 sacks. In 2005, he had a total of 41 tackles, 10.5 TFL, 6.0 sacks and 14 hurries. In 2004, he earned third-team Freshman All-America honors from The Sporting News after playing in all 13 games, recording 33 tackles were 7.5 tackles for loss and 3.0 sacks. He also had a fumble recovery, a forced fumble, three pass break ups and 14 quarterback hurries. 2003: Worked at defensive end while redshirting. He had the best vertical jump (31½") among the incoming freshmen linemen. He upped his vertical to 35 inches by spring practice, the fifth-best leap on the entire defense and turned in the top 40 time among the ends at 4.56 and bench pressed 350 pounds.

== Professional career ==
=== Buffalo Bills ===
Ellis was selected by the Buffalo Bills in the third round of the 2008 NFL draft with the 72nd overall pick. He was moved to the OLB position under George Edwards in Buffalo's new 3-4 defense prior to the 2010 NFL season. He was waived on October 11, 2010.

=== Pittsburgh Steelers ===
The Steelers signed Ellis to their practice squad on November 2, 2010. However, he was waived on August 30, 2011.

=== Saskatchewan Roughriders ===
Ellis was signed by the Saskatchewan Roughriders as a defensive lineman on March 22, 2012.

== Coaching career ==
In 2013, Ellis joined Frostburg State as a coaching intern.

In 2014, Ellis was hired as the defensive line coach for Christopher Newport.

In 2017, Ellis was hired as the defensive ends coach for New Hampshire.

In 2019, Ellis was hired as the defensive line coach for the BC Lions of the Canadian Football League (CFL).

In 2020, Ellis was hired as the defensive line coach for his second stint with Christopher Newport.

In 2022, Ellis was hired as the defensive ends coach for Richmond.
