= 2006 Duke Blue Devils football team =

American college football season

2006 Duke Blue Devils football
- Conference: Atlantic Coast Conference
- Coastal Division
- Record: 0–12 (0–8 ACC)
- Head coach: Ted Roof (3rd season)
- Offensive coordinator: Bill O'Brien (2nd season)
- Offensive scheme: Pro-style
- Co-defensive coordinators: Scott Brown (3rd season); Jerry Azzinaro (3rd season)
- Base defense: Multiple 4–3
- MVP: John Talley
- Captains: Casey Camero; Eli Nichols; John Talley
- Home stadium: Wallace Wade Stadium

2006 Atlantic Coast Conference football standings
	Conf.			Overall
Team	W		L	W		L
Atlantic Division
No. 18 Wake Forest x$	6	–	2	11	–	3
No. 20 Boston College	5	–	3	10	–	3
Maryland	5	–	3	9	–	4
Clemson	5	–	3	8	–	5
Florida State	3	–	5	7	–	6
NC State	2	–	6	3	–	9
Coastal Division
Georgia Tech x	7	–	1	9	–	5
No. 19 Virginia Tech	6	–	2	10	–	3
Virginia	4	–	4	5	–	7
Miami (FL)	3	–	5	7	–	6
North Carolina	2	–	6	3	–	9
Duke	0	–	8	0	–	12
Championship: Wake Forest 9, Georgia Tech 6
$ – BCS representative as conference champion; x – Division champion/co-champions; Rankings from AP Poll

The 2006 Duke Blue Devils football team represented the Duke University in the 2006 NCAA Division I FBS football season. The team was led by head coach Ted Roof. They played their home games at Wallace Wade Stadium in Durham, North Carolina. Duke finished the season with a record of 0–12. The winless season marked the fourth occurrence in the history of Duke football.

== Schedule ==
Date	Time	Opponent	Site	TV	Result	Attendance
September 2	6:00 pm	No. 15 (FCS) Richmond*	Wallace Wade Stadium; Durham, NC		L 0–13	27,546
September 9	12:00 pm	at Wake Forest	Groves Stadium; Winston-Salem, NC (rivalry)	LFS	L 13–14	26,071
September 16	12:00 pm	at No. 14 Virginia Tech	Lane Stadium; Blacksburg, VA	LFS	L 0–36	66,233
September 30	12:00 pm	Virginia^{†}	Wallace Wade Stadium; Durham, NC	LFS	L 0–37	19,241
October 7	7:00 pm	at Alabama*	Bryant–Denny Stadium; Tuscaloosa, AL	ESPNGP	L 14–30	92,138
October 14	1:00 pm	Florida State	Wallace Wade Stadium; Durham, NC		L 24–51	17,525
October 21	1:00 pm	Miami (FL)	Wallace Wade Stadium; Durham, NC	ESPN360	L 15–20	16,291
October 28	1:00 pm	Vanderbilt*	Wallace Wade Stadium; Durham, NC		L 28–45	14,198
November 4	1:00 pm	Navy*	Wallace Wade Stadium; Durham, NC		L 13–38	17,782
November 11	7:00 pm	at No. 22 Boston College	Alumni Stadium; Chestnut Hill, MA	ESPNU	L 7–28	42,326
November 18	1:30 pm	at No. 18 Georgia Tech	Bobby Dodd Stadium; Atlanta, GA		L 21–49	46,768
November 25	12:00 pm	North Carolina	Wallace Wade Stadium; Durham, NC (Victory Bell)	ESPN360	L 44–45	24,478
*Non-conference game; ^{†}Homecoming; Rankings from AP Poll released prior to the game; All times are in Eastern time
