= 2006 Maryland Terrapins football team =

American college football season

2006 Maryland Terrapins football
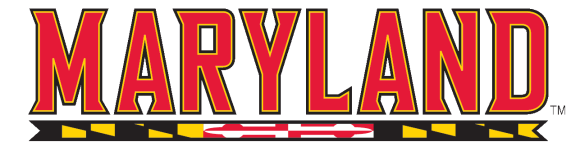

Champs Sports Bowl champion

Champs Sports Bowl, W 24–7 vs. Purdue
- Conference: Atlantic Coast Conference
- Atlantic Division
- Record: 9–4 (5–3 ACC)
- Head coach: Ralph Friedgen (6th season)
- Defensive coordinator: Chris Cosh (1st season)
- Home stadium: Byrd Stadium

2006 Atlantic Coast Conference football standings
	Conf.			Overall
Team	W		L	W		L
Atlantic Division
No. 18 Wake Forest x$	6	–	2	11	–	3
No. 20 Boston College	5	–	3	10	–	3
Maryland	5	–	3	9	–	4
Clemson	5	–	3	8	–	5
Florida State	3	–	5	7	–	6
NC State	2	–	6	3	–	9
Coastal Division
Georgia Tech x	7	–	1	9	–	5
No. 19 Virginia Tech	6	–	2	10	–	3
Virginia	4	–	4	5	–	7
Miami (FL)	3	–	5	7	–	6
North Carolina	2	–	6	3	–	9
Duke	0	–	8	0	–	12
Championship: Wake Forest 9, Georgia Tech 6
$ – BCS representative as conference champion; x – Division champion/co-champions; Rankings from AP Poll

The 2006 Maryland Terrapins football team represented the University of Maryland in the 2006 NCAA Division I FBS football season. It was the Terrapins' 54th season as a member of the Atlantic Coast Conference (ACC) and its second within the framework of the ACC Atlantic Division. Ralph Friedgen led the team for his sixth season as head coach, and he also served as the team's offensive play-caller. Chris Cosh served as the defensive coordinator. The Terrapins completed the season with a 9–4 record and an ACC record of 5–3.

== Schedule ==
Date	Time	Opponent	Rank	Site	TV	Result	Attendance
September 2	6:00 pm	William & Mary*		Byrd Stadium; College Park, MD	ESPN360	W 27–14	49,763
September 9	6:00 pm	Middle Tennessee*		Byrd Stadium; College Park, MD		W 24–10	47,704
September 14	7:45 pm	at No. 5 West Virginia*		Milan Puskar Stadium; Morgantown, WV (rivalry)	ESPN	L 24–45	60,513
September 23	6:00 pm	FIU*		Byrd Stadium; College Park, MD		W 14–10	45,317
October 7	3:30 pm	at No. 18 Georgia Tech		Bobby Dodd Stadium; Atlanta, GA	ESPNU	L 23–27	51,686
October 14	3:30 pm	at Virginia		Scott Stadium; Charlottesville, VA (rivalry)	ESPN360	W 28–26	59,367
October 21	12:00 pm	NC State^{†}		Byrd Stadium; College Park, MD	Raycom/LFS	W 26–20	50,230
October 28	7:00 pm	Florida State		Byrd Stadium; College Park, MD	ESPN2	W 27–24	50,517
November 4	12:00 pm	at No. 19 Clemson		Memorial Stadium; Clemson, SC	ESPN2	W 13–12	80,556
November 11	3:30 pm	Miami (FL)	No. 23	Byrd Stadium; College Park, MD	ABC	W 14–13	50,721
November 18	12:00 pm	at No. 20 Boston College	No. 21	Alumni Stadium; Chestnut Hill, MA	ESPN	L 16–38	44,500
November 25	7:45 pm	No. 20 Wake Forest		Byrd Stadium; College Park, MD	ESPN	L 24–38	51,500
December 29	8:00 pm	vs. Purdue*		Florida Citrus Bowl; Orlando, FL (Champs Sports Bowl)	ESPN	W 24–7	40,168
*Non-conference game; ^{†}Homecoming; Rankings from AP Poll released prior to the game; All times are in Eastern time

== Rankings ==
Ranking movements Legend: ██ Increase in ranking ██ Decrease in ranking — = Not ranked RV = Received votes
	Week															
Poll	Pre	1	2	3	4	5	6	7	8	9	10	11	12	13	14	Final
AP	—	—	—	—	—	—	—	—	—	RV	23	21	RV	RV	RV	RV
Coaches Poll	—	—	—	—	—	—	—	—	—	RV	24	21	RV	RV	RV	RV
Harris	Not released				—	—	—	—	—	—	23	21	—	—	—	Not released
BCS	Not released							—	—	—	23	19	—	—	—	Not released

== Game summaries ==
=== William & Mary ===
	1	2	3	4	Total
William & Mary	0	7	0	7	14
Maryland	14	10	3	0	27

=== Middle Tennessee ===
	1	2	3	4	Total
Middle Tennessee	3	0	7	0	10
Maryland	10	7	7	0	24

=== West Virginia ===
	1	2	3	4	Total
Maryland	0	10	7	7	24
#5 West Virginia	28	10	7	0	45

=== FIU ===
	1	2	3	4	Total
FIU	0	7	0	3	10
Maryland	7	7	0	0	14

=== Georgia Tech ===
	1	2	3	4	Total
Maryland	10	10	3	0	23
#20 Georgia Tech	7	7	0	13	27

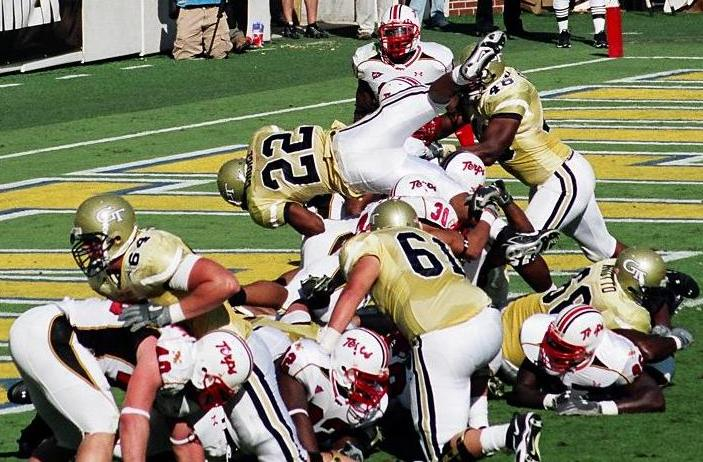
Georgia Tech tailback Tashard Choice (#22) dives into the end zone against the Terps.

=== Virginia ===
	1	2	3	4	Total
Maryland	0	0	7	21	28
Virginia	10	10	0	6	26

=== NC State ===
	1	2	3	4	Total
NC State	0	0	6	14	20
Maryland	0	6	17	3	26

=== Florida State ===
	1	2	3	4	Total
Florida State	7	7	7	3	24
Maryland	10	10	7	0	27

=== Clemson ===
	1	2	3	4	Total
Maryland	0	7	3	3	13
#19 Clemson	3	3	0	6	12

=== Miami (FL) ===
	1	2	3	4	Total
Miami (FL)	0	10	0	3	13
#24 Maryland	7	7	0	0	14

=== Boston College ===
	1	2	3	4	Total
#21 Maryland	0	6	10	0	16
#20 Boston College	14	14	7	3	38

=== Wake Forest ===
	1	2	3	4	Total
#20 Wake Forest	7	14	10	7	38
Maryland	7	7	3	7	24

=== Champs Sports Bowl vs. Purdue ===
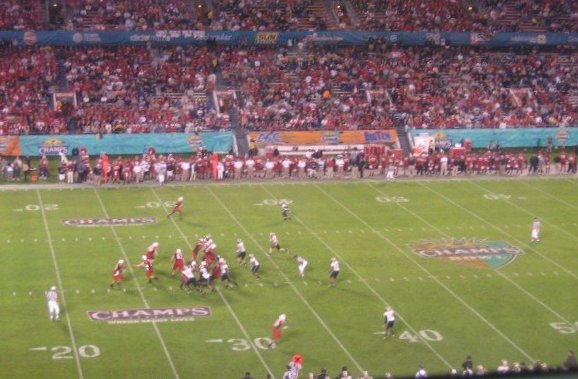
Maryland defeated Prudue, 24–7, in the 2006 Champs Sports Bowl.

	1	2	3	4	Total
Purdue	0	7	0	0	7
Maryland	7	14	3	0	24

== 2007 NFL draft ==
The following players were selected in the 2007 NFL draft.

Player	Position	Round	Overall	NFL team
Josh Wilson	Defensive back	2	55	Seattle Seahawks
Adam Podlesh	Punter	4	101	Jacksonville Jaguars
