= D'Vontrey Richardson =

American baseball player (born 1988)

- Center fielder
- Born: July 30, 1988 (age 38); Albany, Georgia, U.S.
- Bats: Right Throws: Right
- Stats at Baseball Reference

D'Vontrey D'Wayne Richardson (born July 30, 1988) is an American former professional baseball and college football player.

== Early life ==
Richardson was born July 30, 1988, in Albany, Georgia, and is the son of Gevett Roberson and Demitrius Richardson. Richardson attended Lee County High School in Leesburg, Georgia, where he excelled in football and baseball.

In football, Richardson earned all-state Honorable Mention honors as a junior as he passed for 1,758 yards, rushed for 1,130 yards and scored a total of 29 touchdowns. He ran a 4.58 in the 40-yard dash and recorded a 32-inch vertical jump in the Tallahassee Nike Camp prior to his senior season, both ranked as the second best numbers amongst quarterbacks in attendance at the camp. Richardson was the quarterback on GaSports.com's pre-season all-state team prior to his senior season. During his senior year, he passed for over 2,200 yards and 27 passing touchdowns and rushing for 1,050 yards and 17 rushing touchdowns. Richardson was a five-star prospect and an All-American selection as a senior by Scout.com. He was the Class 4A Offensive Player of the Year and an All-State first team selection by the Georgia Sports Writers Association.

In baseball, Richardson had a .386 batting average with seven home runs and 37 RBI as a junior in Lee County's run to the state finals and participated in the 2005 Perfect Game National Showcase. As a senior, Richardson led Lee County in batting average (.507), runs (34), home runs (six) and stolen bases (11). He also recorded 20 RBIs. As a senior, he was ranked as the No. 82 prep player in the nation according to Baseball America and the No. 1 prep athlete in the state of Georgia by Rivals.com. After being recruited by Alabama, Georgia and Oklahoma, Richardson verbally committed to continue his two-sport career at Florida State University in August 2005 and signed a National Letter of Intent to FSU in February 2006. Richardson graduated in June 2006 and was drafted by the Washington Nationals in the 2006 First-Year Player Draft in the 35th round with the 1,051st pick, but he did not sign with the team and decided to enter college.

== College career ==
=== Football ===
D'Vontrey Richardson
No. 10
- Position: Quarterback

Personal information
- Born: July 30, 1988 (age 38); Albany, Georgia, U.S.
- Listed height: 6 ft 1 in (1.85 m)
- Listed weight: 214 lb (97 kg)

Career information
- High school: Lee County (Leesburg, Georgia)
- College: Florida State (2006–2008)

Awards and highlights
- Holds the record for longest rushing touchdown by a FSU quarterback-55 yards vs. UTC (2008)
- Stats at ESPN

Richardson redshirted in football his true freshman season at Florida State in 2006. In 2007, he served as the emergency back-up quarterback behind starting quarterback Drew Weatherford, Xavier Lee and Christian Ponder. Richardson earned playing time in two games in 2007, one play each at home against Alabama and on the road against Virginia Tech, where he was tackled late in the 4th quarter in the endzone for a safety. In 2008, quarterbacks coach and offensive coordinator Jimbo Fisher chose Ponder to be the starting quarterback over 2007's starter and 5th-year senior Weatherford and redshirt sophomore Richardson, who Seminoles head coach Bobby Bowden said made "wonderful progress" during the off-season. Bowden said they ultimately chose Ponder because he was the more mobile quarterback. Richardson was named the second-string quarterback, but mainly a change of pace quarterback than a true second-team passer, while Weatherford was demoted to third-string quarterback. During the season opener against Western Carolina, Richardson would see his first significant playing time. At the start of the second drive of the second half (and with Florida State winning 35–0), Richardson came into the game as quarterback. He completed 5 of 6 pass attempts for 57 yards and one passing touchdown. Richardson also had four rushes for 68 yards with two rushing touchdowns, including a 52-yard rushing touchdown, at the time, a record for the longest touchdown run by a FSU quarterback. Florida State won the game 69–0. FSU's next game was against University of Tennessee at Chattanooga (UTC). With the Seminoles having a comfortable lead, Richardson again relieved Ponder in the second half. He completed 9 of 14 pass attempts with one passing touchdown. Richardson also had a 55-yard rushing touchdown in the 3rd quarter, setting the record for longest touchdown run by a FSU quarterback, eclipsing a record he set just a week earlier. FSU won the game 46–7. In all, Richardson played in 10 games during the 2008 season. For the season, he completed 23 of 44 passes for 315 yards and 3 passing touchdowns. Richardson also had 255 rushing yards and 3 rushing touchdowns on the season. Richardson saw less and less time at quarterback as the season progressed and, during the offseason, he decided he would play on defense as a safety once the 2009 football season began.

=== Baseball ===
Richardson played baseball at FSU under coach Mike Martin. As a freshman in 2007, Richardson made 28 total starts in center field and four starts in left field. He put together a season high seven game hit streak early in the season and registered five three hit games. Richardson posted a .351 batting average and .481 slugging percentage in 131 at-bats as a freshman. Florida State ended the 2007 season with an NCAA tournament appearance, a 45–13 record and ranked #10 in the final NCAA college baseball poll. As a sophomore, Richardson had to sit out the 2008 baseball season due to academic issues. The time off from baseball gave Richardson the chance to spend more time on football and challenge for the starting quarterback job. After splitting time with quarterback and fellow redshirt sophomore Christian Ponder at the beginning of the season, Richardson saw less and less time at quarterback as the season progressed. In 2009, during the offseason, head football coach Bowden gave Richardson his blessing to miss offseason workouts as well as spring practice to play baseball. Coach Martin said Richardson is a "legit five-tool guy" with a sky's-the-limit future. As a junior, Richardson started 22 games and played in a total of 46 games. He posted a .304 batting average with a .405 slugging percentage in 79 plate appearances. He had 24 hits, 6 walks and a .371 on-base percentage. Florida State ended the season with a 45–18 record, the ACC Atlantic Divisional Champions as well as the ACC regular season Conference Champions. After the season, Richardson was selected by the Milwaukee Brewers in the 5th round with the 166th pick of the 2009 Major League Baseball First-Year Player Draft. He officially signed with the Brewers at the end of July 2009, opting not to return to FSU for his senior year and receiving a $400,000 signing bonus.

== Minor League career stats ==
| YEAR | TEAM | G | AB | AVG | R | H | 2B | 3B | HR | RBI | BB | SO | SB | CS | OBP | SLG |
|---|---|---|---|---|---|---|---|---|---|---|---|---|---|---|---|---|
| 2010 | WIS | 132 | 522 | .243 | 78 | 127 | 28 | 8 | 7 | 51 | 58 | 164 | 17 | 15 | .331 | .368 |
| 2011 | BRV | 97 | 359 | .284 | 47 | 102 | 13 | 7 | 3 | 41 | 22 | 70 | 9 | 13 | .327 | .384 |
| 2013 | BRV | 52 | 209 | .325 | 25 | 68 | 12 | 2 | 1 | 13 | 14 | 43 | 13 | 6 | .372 | .416 |
| 2013 | BRE | 5 | 24 | .292 | 3 | 7 | 0 | 0 | 0 | 3 | 1 | 0 | 0 | 0 | .320 | .292 |
| 2014 | HVL | 77 | 289 | .239 | 44 | 69 | 12 | 3 | 5 | 36 | 21 | 2 | 15 | 2 | .295 | .353 |
