= 2006 Florida State Seminoles football team =

American college football season

2006 Florida State Seminoles football

Emerald Bowl Champion (vacated)

Emerald Bowl, W 44–27 (vacated) vs. UCLA
- Conference: Atlantic Coast Conference
- Atlantic Division
- Record: 2–6, 5 wins vacated (1–5 ACC, 2 wins vacated)
- Head coach: Bobby Bowden (31st season)
- Offensive coordinator: Jeff Bowden (6th season)
- Offensive scheme: Pro-style
- Defensive coordinator: Mickey Andrews (23rd season)
- Base defense: 4–3
- Captains: Lorenzo Booker; Buster Davis; Mikhal Kornegay
- Home stadium: Doak Campbell Stadium

2006 Atlantic Coast Conference football standings
	Conf.			Overall
Team	W		L	W		L
Atlantic Division
No. 18 Wake Forest x$	6	–	2	11	–	3
No. 20 Boston College	5	–	3	10	–	3
Maryland	5	–	3	9	–	4
Clemson	5	–	3	8	–	5
Florida State	3	–	5	7	–	6
NC State	2	–	6	3	–	9
Coastal Division
Georgia Tech x	7	–	1	9	–	5
No. 19 Virginia Tech	6	–	2	10	–	3
Virginia	4	–	4	5	–	7
Miami (FL)	3	–	5	7	–	6
North Carolina	2	–	6	3	–	9
Duke	0	–	8	0	–	12
Championship: Wake Forest 9, Georgia Tech 6
$ – BCS representative as conference champion; x – Division champion/co-champions; Rankings from AP Poll

The 2006 Florida State Seminoles football team represented the Florida State University as a member of the Atlantic Coast Conference (ACC) during the 2006 NCAA Division I FBS football season. Led by 31st-year head coach Bobby Bowden, the Seminoles compiled an overall record of 7–6 with a mark of 3–5 in conference play, placing fifth in the ACC's Atlantic Division. Florida State was invited to the Emerald Bowl, where the Seminoles defeated UCLA. The team played home games at Doak Campbell Stadium in Tallahassee, Florida.

Florida State's record of 7–6 was the worst under Bowden since his first year as head coach, in 1976, when the Seminoles went 5–6. Florida State later vacated five wins from the 2006 season, including two conference victories and win in the Emerald Bowl, as punishment for violations of related to the Florida State University academic-athletic scandal.

== Schedule ==
Date	Time	Opponent	Rank	Site	TV	Result	Attendance	Source
September 4	8:00 p.m.	at No. 12 Miami (FL)	No. 11	Miami Orange Bowl; Miami, FL (rivalry, College GameDay)	ESPN	W 13–10	71,481	
September 9	6:00 p.m.	Troy*	No. 9	Doak Campbell Stadium; Tallahassee, FL	PPV	W 24–17	77,217	
September 16	7:45 p.m.	Clemson	No. 10	Doak Campbell Stadium; Tallahassee, FL (rivalry)	ESPN	L 20–27	83,510	
September 23	3:30 p.m.	Rice*	No. 17	Doak Campbell Stadium; Tallahassee, FL	ESPNU	W 55–7 (vacated)	78,154	
October 5	7:30 p.m.	at NC State	No. 16	Carter–Finley Stadium; Raleigh, NC	ESPN	L 20–24	57,437	
October 14	1:00 p.m.	at Duke		Wallace Wade Stadium; Durham, NC		W 51–24 (vacated)	17,525	
October 21	3:30 p.m.	No. 21 Boston College		Doak Campbell Stadium; Tallahassee, FL	ABC	L 19–24	83,043	
October 28	7:00 p.m.	at Maryland		Byrd Stadium; College Park, MD	ESPN2	L 24–27	50,517	
November 4	12:00 p.m.	Virginia		Doak Campbell Stadium; Tallahassee, FL (Jefferson–Eppes Trophy)	Raycom/LFS	W 33–0 (vacated)	82,804	
November 11	8:00 p.m.	No. 19 Wake Forest		Doak Campbell Stadium; Tallahassee, FL	ABC	L 0–30	77,785	
November 18	2:00 p.m.	Western Michigan*^{†}		Doak Campbell Stadium; Tallahassee, FL		W 28–20 (vacated)	78,236	
November 25	12:00 p.m.	No. 4 Florida*		Doak Campbell Stadium; Tallahassee, FL (rivalry)	ABC	L 14–21	83,507	
December 27	8:00 p.m.	vs. UCLA*		AT&T Park; San Francisco, CA (Emerald Bowl)	ESPN	W 44–27 (vacated)	40,331	
*Non-conference game; ^{†}Homecoming; Rankings from AP Poll released prior to the game; All times are in Eastern time

== Preseason ==
The Seminoles were picked by the ACC media as the preseason favorite to win the ACC's Atlantic Division. Sophomore quarterback Drew Weatherford finished fourth in voting for the ACC's Preseason Player of the Year.

== Rankings ==
Ranking movements Legend: ██ Increase in ranking ██ Decrease in ranking — = Not ranked RV = Received votes
	Week															
Poll	Pre	1	2	3	4	5	6	7	8	9	10	11	12	13	14	Final
AP	11	9	9	18	19	17	RV	RV	—	—	—	—	—	—	—	—
Coaches	10	9	10	17	17	16	RV	RV	—	—	—	—	—	—	—	—
Harris	Not released				20	17	—	—	—	—	—	—	—	—	—	Not released
BCS	Not released							—	—	—	—	—	—	—	—	Not released

== Game summaries ==
=== Miami (FL) ===
	1	2	3	4	Total
#10 Florida State	3	0	0	10	13
#11 Miami	0	10	0	0	10

Florida State played their season opener against the rival University of Miami Hurricanes on Labor Day for the third straight year. It was also the third time the team opened their Atlantic Coast Conference play with Miami. Much like the previous two Labor Day meetings, the 2006 edition of the game was a defensive struggle for both teams. The Seminoles trailed 3–10 at the half, but held Miami scoreless in the third and fourth quarters and took the lead with a 33-yard field goal late in the game. The 'Noles preserved the win when cornerback Michael Ray Garvin intercepted Miami quarterback Kyle Wright's pass with 29 seconds remaining.

=== Troy ===
	1	2	3	4	Total
Troy	0	3	7	7	17
#9 Florida State	0	0	10	14	24

After winning at Miami, the Seminoles returned home to Bobby Bowden Field at Doak Campbell Stadium to take on the Troy Trojans. The Seminole offense continued to struggle, and the 'Noles found themselves shut out in the first half and down by three points to a team many expected them to blow out. After Troy scored early in the fourth quarter to take the lead, 17–10, ABC began to cut into their broadcast of #1 Ohio State at #2 Texas to update viewers on "the major upset brewing in Tallahassee." The Seminoles scored two touchdowns in the final 6:12 and avoided the upset, winning 24–17.

=== Clemson ===
	1	2	3	4	Total
Clemson	6	8	6	7	27
#10 Florida State	2	7	3	8	20

Dubbed "Bowden Bowl VIII," Tommy Bowden's Clemson Tigers traveled to Doak Campbell Stadium for a pivotal ACC match-up with his father's Seminole team. Clemson had lost to ACC foe Boston College in overtime the week before, and was looking to reinsert themselves into the ACC Championship picture. Again, the Florida State offense struggled. The only points scored by the 'Noles in the first half of the game were scored by cornerback Tony Carter, who returned a blocked extra point for 2 points and a blocked field goal for a touchdown. With the game tied 20–20 late in the fourth quarter, Clemson switched to a no-huddle offense and running back James Davis gashed the unprepared Seminole defense for 47 yards, setting up a Clemson score with eight seconds left on the clock. Backup Seminole quarterback Xavier Lee entered the game and attempted a hail mary pass, but the ball was batted to the ground and Clemson left Tallahassee with a 27–20 win. It was the first time Clemson had won at Doak Campbell Stadium since 1989 and the third time Tommy Bowden had beaten his father since becoming Clemson's head coach in 1999.

=== Rice ===
	1	2	3	4	Total
Rice	7	0	0	0	7
#17 Florida State	14	12	14	15	55

The Seminoles rebounded from their loss to Clemson by routing the winless Rice Owls in front of one of the smallest crowds to attend a football game at Doak Campbell Stadium in years. For the first time in the 2006 season, FSU scored a touchdown on their opening drive. After a quick Rice touchdown tied the game, the 'Noles went on to score 48 unanswered points and earned a 55–7 victory. Backup quarterback Xavier Lee saw meaningful playing time for the first time in the season, and wide receiver Greg Carr caught two touchdowns. The Florida State running game, which had been anemic all season, exploded for 287 yards.

=== NC State ===
	1	2	3	4	Total
#16 Florida State	3	10	7	0	20
NC State	0	10	7	7	24

Florida State traveled to Raleigh, NC to take on the North Carolina State Wolf Pack in a Thursday night game that was televised by ESPN. NC State, coached by former FSU assistant Chuck Amato, was seeking its second straight win over a ranked ACC opponent after suffering embarrassing losses to Akron and Southern Miss earlier in the season. FSU attempted to use more motion on offense and seemed determined to establish a running game, despite mixed results from running backs Lorenzo Booker and Antone Smith. After the Seminole defense stopped the Wolf Pack from scoring one yard away from the end zone, 'Nole quarterback Drew Weatherford led the offense on a 14-play, 99-yard scoring drive to give FSU a 20–10 lead in the third quarter. It was not enough, as NC State quarterback Daniel Evans led his team to two scores late in the game to put the Wolf Pack up 24–20. With one last chance, FSU began to drive down the field but Weatherford's pass was tipped and intercepted with 2:27 remaining. Utilizing the new NCAA clock rules to their fullest advantage, NC State was able to take three knees and run out the clock. With the win, Amato is now 4–3 against Bowden since becoming the head coach at NC State.

The loss, Florida State's second to an unranked opponent in the 2006 season, caused the Seminoles to tumble out of polls and ignited a wave of criticism directed mostly at the FSU coaching staff. Fans on message boards around the Internet voiced their displeasure, and the downward spiral of the program was the subject of many newspaper articles and radio call-in shows for days after the game. When head coach Bobby Bowden was asked in an interview if he was rooting for ACC conference foe Wake Forest to beat Clemson that Saturday (thereby giving FSU a much better chance of returning to the ACC Championship game), he responded "I have to go with blood." This drew the ire of many fans who were already angry with Bowden for refusing to demote his son, FSU offensive coordinator Jeff Bowden, after six years of underachieving Florida State offensive performances.

=== Duke ===
	1	2	3	4	Total
Florida State	21	2	14	14	51
Duke	0	6	11	7	24

FSU had no problem dispatching of the winless Duke Blue Devils, and used the game to get their younger players valuable experience. The 'Noles struck first early when linebacker Lawrence Timmons returned a Duke fumble 37 yards for a touchdown. After beginning the game with six straight incompletions, QB Drew Weatherford had his most solid performance of the season, going 16/18 for the remainder of time he was in the game. Weatherford threw four touchdown passes (three to WR Greg Carr) and had no interceptions. Backup QB Xavier Lee entered the game in the second quarter but struggled, throwing three picks. For the second time in the 2006 season, the Seminoles blocked an opponent's extra point attempt and returned it for two points.

Florida State continued to be hit hard by injuries. Linebacker Geno Hayes went down with an apparent knee injury in the first quarter, making him the fifth FSU linebacker this season to suffer a serious injury. Later tests revealed that Hayes sprained his MCL, and his status for the Boston College game is unknown. In addition, tight end Brandon Warren suffered a hamstring pull in the second quarter and is doubtful to play this week.

=== Boston College ===
	1	2	3	4	Total
#21 Boston College	0	21	3	0	24
Florida State	0	10	0	9	19

Florida State lost another close ACC game at home against Boston College. The team wore special black uniforms and the fans wore black to honor the Seminole Tribe of Florida. A new statue, also honoring the Tribe was unveiled outside Doak Campbell Stadium on the day before the game. A special guest from the Seminole Tribe planted Chief Osceola's spear during the pre-game ceremony.

=== Maryland ===
	1	2	3	4	Total
Florida State	7	7	7	3	24
Maryland	10	10	7	0	27

Starting sophomore quarterback Xavier Lee for the injured Drew Weatherford, Florida State was unable to break out of its funk, losing its second straight game and fourth out of five. Lee was impressive in his start, completing 22 of 36 passes for 286 yards and 2 touchdowns. Receiver Chris Davis also had a good game, catching 8 passes for 132 yards and 1 touchdown. But it wasn't enough against a determined Maryland Terrapins squad. Trailing 27–24, the Seminoles had an opportunity to tie the game up in the final minute, but a 46-yard field goal attempt by kicker Gary Cismesia was blocked by Maryland, sealing the win for Maryland. The defeat dropped Florida State to 4–4 on the season and 2–4 in the ACC.

=== Virginia ===
	1	2	3	4	Total
Virginia	0	0	0	0	0
Florida State	14	3	16	0	33

Xavier Lee started for the second consecutive game, picking up his first win as a starter. Drew Weatherford played in the fourth quarter. Tony Carter's INT return for a TD was FSU's first since A.J. Nicholson accomplished the feat during last year's game against Boston College. This was FSU's first defensive shutout since blanking Notre Dame in South Bend, in 2003.

=== Wake Forest ===
	1	2	3	4	Total
#19 Wake Forest	3	17	10	0	30
Florida State	0	0	0	0	0

Quarterbacks Xavier Lee and Drew Weatherford combined for 4 costly interceptions as Wake Forest beat Florida State for the first time in ACC play. The 30–0 loss was the worst in years for the Seminoles and was also the first time Bobby Bowden had been shut out in Tallahassee since he became the head coach of Florida State 31 years earlier. While Wake Forest moved to 9–1 and continued their Cinderella season, FSU fell to 5–5 and finished with a 3–5 record in the ACC – their first losing record since joining the conference in 1992. Three days after the game, Florida State offensive coordinator Jeff Bowden announced that he would be resigning at the end of the season. It was later revealed that Bowden will receive a $537,000 buyout from Seminole Boosters, Inc., in exchange for stepping down.

=== Western Michigan ===
	1	2	3	4	Total
Western Michigan	3	7	3	7	20
Florida State	0	14	7	7	28

Florida State beat Western Michigan 28–20 on a sunny afternoon in Tallahassee, allowing Florida State to become bowl eligible for the 25th consecutive season. The Homecoming game was watched by about 70,000 fans in Doak Campbell Stadium. Sophomore quarterback Drew Weatherford started but was relieved in the second quarter by Xavier Lee, who threw two touchdown passes to WR Greg Carr. RB Antone Smith started for the first time in his college career, but was lost for the remainder of the season when he dislocated his elbow on the Seminoles' first offensive series. Lorenzo Booker, who was originally going to be used as a slot receiver in the game, reclaimed the rushing duties from that point on. Florida State LB Lawrence Timmons broke open a close game in the third quarter when he scored on a 22-yard interception return. Western Michigan pulled to within eight points late in the fourth quarter and twice converted on 4th-and-10 during their last drive of the game. However, Broncos QB Ryan Cubit's pass into the end zone on 4th-and-29 as time expired was incomplete, and the Seminoles preserved the victory.

=== Florida ===
	1	2	3	4	Total
#4 Florida	7	7	0	7	21
Florida State	0	0	7	7	14

Florida State finished its regular season against archrival #4 Florida Gators. Florida took a 14–0 lead in the first half, but Florida State came back to tie the game at 14–14 at the beginning of the fourth quarter. Florida scored the final touchdown of the game a few minutes later to win 21–14. The Gators extended their winning streak over FSU to three games with just their second win at Doak Campbell Stadium in the past 20 years. FSU entered the game unranked after having its worst season since the early 1980s. Former Seminole great Ron Simmons gave LB Buster Davis permission to wear his retired #50 jersey for the game.

=== UCLA–Emerald Bowl ===
	1	2	3	4	Total
Florida State	7	6	10	21	44
UCLA	10	10	7	0	27

Florida State travelled to San Francisco, CA to take on and defeat (44–27) UCLA in the Emerald Bowl on December 27, 2006.

== Personnel ==
=== Coaching staff ===
- Head coach: Bobby Bowden
- Offensive coordinator: Jeff Bowden
- Defensive coordinator: Mickey Andrews
- Executive head coach, linebackers: Kevin Steele
- Assistant head coach, running backs: Billy Sexton
- Defensive tackles: Odell Haggins
- Tight ends, recruiting coordinator: John Lilly
- Quarterbacks: Daryl Dickey
- Offensive line: Mark McHale
- Defensive line: Jody Allen
- Graduate assistant, defense: James Colzie III
- Graduate assistant, offense: Ron Dugans
- Graduate assistant, strength and conditioning: Tim Fertig
- Strength and conditioning: Jon Jost
- Executive assistant, academic standards: Dan Marwood

=== Starting lineup ===
Offense

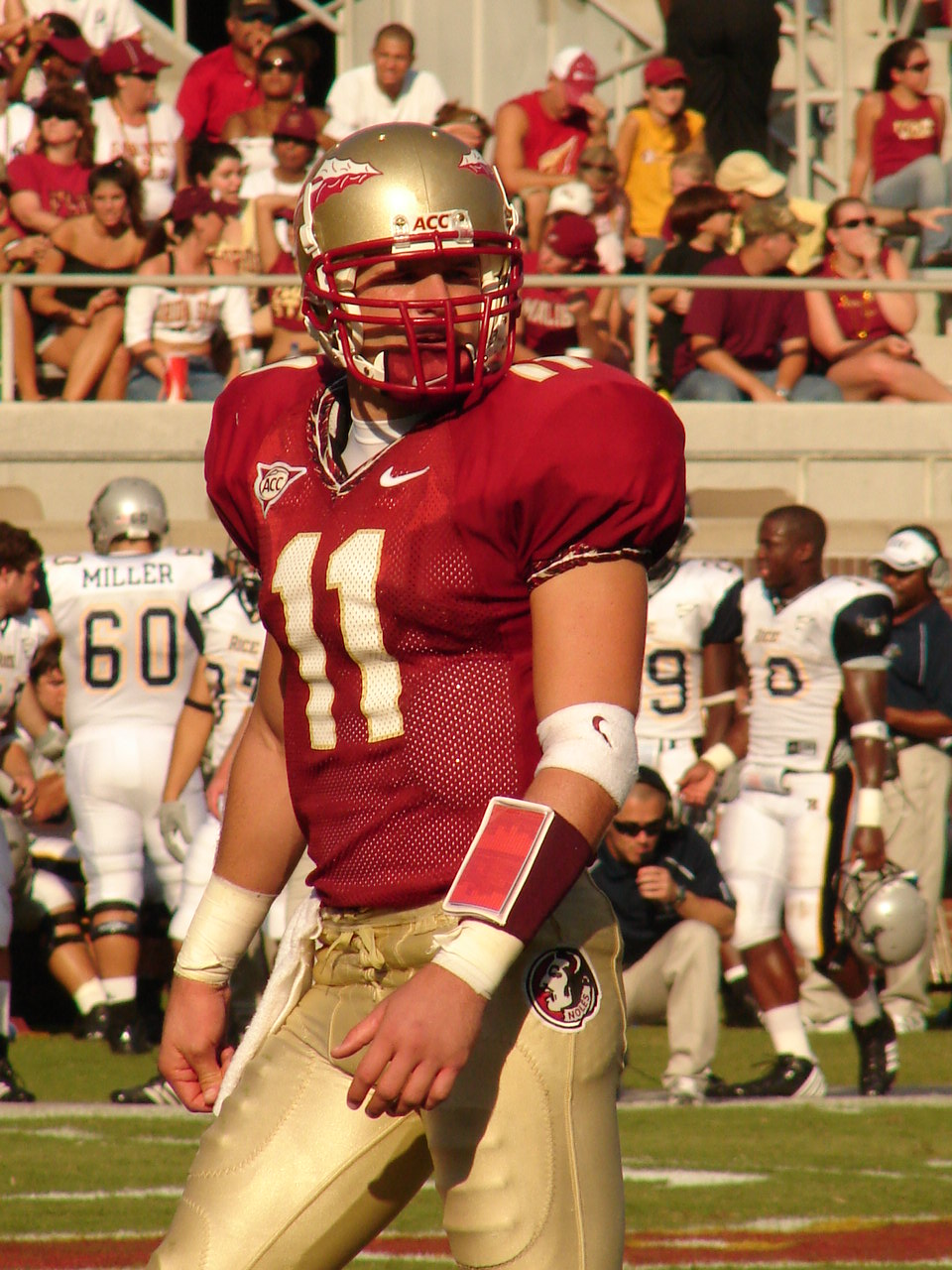
Drew Weatherford

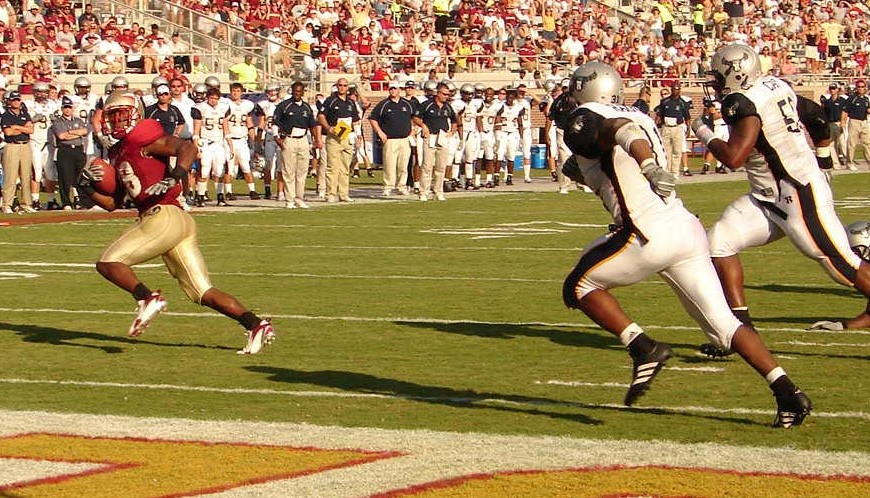
Lorenzo Booker

Offensive scheme: Pro-style

Position	Number	Name	Class
QB	11	Drew Weatherford	So.
RB	28	Lorenzo Booker	Sr.
FB	32	Joe Surratt	Jr.
WR	81	De'Cody Fagg	Jr.
WR	5	Chris Davis	Sr.
TE	19	Caz Piurowski	Fr.
LT	75	Mario Henderson	Sr.
LG	68	Jacky Claude	Jr.
C	67	John Frady	Jr.
RG	62	Cory Niblock	Sr.
RT	73	Shannon Boatman	Jr.

Defense

Base defense: 4–3 multiple

Position	Number	Name	Class
E	92	Darrell Burston	Jr.
NT	96	Andre Fluellen	Jr.
T	93	Letroy Guion	So.
E	98	Alex Boston	Jr.
WLB	10	Geno Hayes	So.
MLB	50	Buster Davis	Sr.
SLB	83	Lawrence Timmons	Jr.
CB	15	Tony Carter	So.
ROV	3	Myron Rolle	Fr.
FS	8	Roger Williams	Jr.
CB	29	Michael Ray Garvin	So.

Special teams

Position	Number	Name	Class
K	12	Gary Cismesia	Jr.
KR	29	Michael Ray Garvin	So.
P	43	Graham Gano	So.
PR	5	Chris Davis	Sr.

=== Recruits ===
College recruiting information
Name	Hometown	School	Height	Weight	40^{‡}	Commit date
Mister Alexander; DB	Aldine, TX	Dwight D. Eisenhower HS	6 ft 3 in (1.91 m)	183 lb (83 kg)	4.4	Feb 1, 2006
Mister Alexander; DB	Recruit ratings: Scout: Rivals: (80)					
Marcus Ball; LB	Stone Mountain, GA	Stephenson HS	6 ft 0 in (1.83 m)	205 lb (93 kg)	4.5	Jan 31, 2006
Marcus Ball; LB	Recruit ratings: Scout: Rivals: (89)					
Evan Bellamy; OL	Miami, FL	Gulliver Preparatory	6 ft 4 in (1.93 m)	315 lb (143 kg)	5.3	Jan 8, 2006
Evan Bellamy; OL	Recruit ratings: Scout: Rivals: (72)					
Shannon Boatman; OL	Tyler, TX	Tyler Junior College	6 ft 8 in (2.03 m)	325 lb (147 kg)	5.0	Dec 15, 2005
Shannon Boatman; OL	Recruit ratings: Scout: Rivals: (N/A)					
Brent Brewer; WR	Tyrone, GA	Sandy Creek HS	6 ft 2 in (1.88 m)	187 lb (85 kg)	4.4	Jan 29, 2006
Brent Brewer; WR	Recruit ratings: Scout: Rivals: (40)					
Brandon Davis; OL	Miami, FL	South Miami HS	6 ft 2 in (1.88 m)	290 lb (130 kg)	5.2	Dec 8, 2005
Brandon Davis; OL	Recruit ratings: Scout: Rivals: (73)					
Tyler Graves; OL	Sumrall, MS	Sumrall HS	6 ft 6 in (1.98 m)	272 lb (123 kg)	5.2	Jan 29, 2006
Tyler Graves; OL	Recruit ratings: Scout: Rivals: (67)					
Paul Griffin; DT	El Dorado, KS	Butler County Community College	6 ft 1 in (1.85 m)	287 lb (130 kg)	4.8	Dec 18, 2005
Paul Griffin; DT	Recruit ratings: Scout: Rivals: (N/A)					
Matt Hardrick; OL	Chatham, VA	Hargrave Military Academy	6 ft 5 in (1.96 m)	340 lb (150 kg)	N/A	Aug 23, 2005
Matt Hardrick; OL	Recruit ratings: Scout: Rivals: (40)					
Seddrick Holloway; RB	Tallahassee, FL	Lincoln HS	5 ft 10 in (1.78 m)	235 lb (107 kg)	4.7	Jan 26, 2006
Seddrick Holloway; RB	Recruit ratings: Scout: Rivals: (78)					
Ochuko Jenije; DB	Tallahassee, FL	North Florida Christian HS	5 ft 11 in (1.80 m)	177 lb (80 kg)	4.4	Feb 1, 2006
Ochuko Jenije; DB	Recruit ratings: Scout: Rivals: (67)					
Anthony Leon; DB	Miami, FL	Gulliver Preparatory	6 ft 3 in (1.91 m)	210 lb (95 kg)	4.6	Oct 12, 2005
Anthony Leon; DB	Recruit ratings: Scout: Rivals: (80)					
Damon McDaniel; WR	Virginia Beach, VA	Landstown HS	6 ft 0 in (1.83 m)	192 lb (87 kg)	4.5	Jan 31, 2006
Damon McDaniel; WR	Recruit ratings: Scout: Rivals: (85)					
Ryan McMahon; DT	Rome, GA	Darlington HS	6 ft 3 in (1.91 m)	280 lb (130 kg)	4.9	Jul 8, 2005
Ryan McMahon; DT	Recruit ratings: Scout: Rivals: (80)					
Kevin McNeil; DE	Kingsland, GA	Camden County HS	6 ft 3 in (1.91 m)	240 lb (110 kg)	4.6	Jan 15, 2006
Kevin McNeil; DE	Recruit ratings: Scout: Rivals: (75)					
Justin Mincey; DE	Chatham, VA	Hargrave Military Academy	6 ft 5 in (1.96 m)	275 lb (125 kg)	N/A	Aug 23, 2005
Justin Mincey; DE	Recruit ratings: Scout: Rivals: (40)					
Preston Parker; WR	Delray Beach, FL	Atlantic Community HS	6 ft 0 in (1.83 m)	175 lb (79 kg)	4.5	Feb 1, 2006
Preston Parker; WR	Recruit ratings: Scout: Rivals: (69)					
Caz Piurowski; TE	Land O' Lakes, FL	Land O' Lakes HS	6 ft 8 in (2.03 m)	234 lb (106 kg)	4.75	Jul 6, 2005
Caz Piurowski; TE	Recruit ratings: Scout: Rivals: (80)					
Christian Ponder; QB	Colleyville, TX	Colleyville Heritage HS	6 ft 2 in (1.88 m)	202 lb (92 kg)	4.8	Jul 29, 2005
Christian Ponder; QB	Recruit ratings: Scout: Rivals: (74)					
Tim Rawlinson; LB	Prattville, AL	Prattville HS	6 ft 1 in (1.85 m)	215 lb (98 kg)	4.6	Nov 30, 2005
Tim Rawlinson; LB	Recruit ratings: Scout: Rivals: (74)					
D'Vontrey Richardson; ATH	Leesburg, GA	Lee County HS	6 ft 1 in (1.85 m)	200 lb (91 kg)	4.6	Aug 1, 2005
D'Vontrey Richardson; ATH	Recruit ratings: Scout: Rivals: (77)					
Patrick Robinson; DB	Miami, FL	Gulliver Preparatory	5 ft 11 in (1.80 m)	170 lb (77 kg)	4.5	Feb 1, 2006
Patrick Robinson; DB	Recruit ratings: Scout: Rivals: (75)					
Myron Rolle; ATH	Princeton, NJ	The Hun School Of Princeton	6 ft 2 in (1.88 m)	215 lb (98 kg)	4.5	Sep 1, 2005
Myron Rolle; ATH	Recruit ratings: Scout: Rivals: (94)					
Daron Rose; OL	Tampa, FL	Jefferson HS	6 ft 5 in (1.96 m)	310 lb (140 kg)	5.8	Feb 1, 2006
Daron Rose; OL	Recruit ratings: Scout: Rivals: (80)					
Marcus Sims; LB	Tallahassee, FL	North Florida Christian HS	6 ft 0 in (1.83 m)	210 lb (95 kg)	4.5	Feb 1, 2006
Marcus Sims; LB	Recruit ratings: Scout: Rivals: (83)					
Doug Thacker; DE	Sanford, FL	Seminole HS	6 ft 3 in (1.91 m)	245 lb (111 kg)	4.9	Jan 19, 2006
Doug Thacker; DE	Recruit ratings: Scout: Rivals: (73)					
Toddrick Verdell; DB	El Dorado, KS	Butler County Community College	6 ft 3 in (1.91 m)	215 lb (98 kg)	4.4	Dec 18, 2005
Toddrick Verdell; DB	Recruit ratings: Scout: Rivals: (N/A)					
Brandon Warren; DE	Alcoa, TN	Alcoa HS	6 ft 2 in (1.88 m)	230 lb (100 kg)	4.8	Jul 12, 2005
Brandon Warren; DE	Recruit ratings: Scout: Rivals: (89)					
Dekoda Watson; LB	Aiken, SC	South Aiken HS	6 ft 2 in (1.88 m)	205 lb (93 kg)	4.6	Jan 30, 2006
Dekoda Watson; LB	Recruit ratings: Scout: Rivals: (40)					
Recardo Wright; LB	Orlando, FL	Dr. Phillips HS	6 ft 2 in (1.88 m)	215 lb (98 kg)	4.5	Feb 1, 2006
Recardo Wright; LB	Recruit ratings: Scout: Rivals: (77)					
Overall recruit ranking:
‡ Refers to 40-yard dash; Note: In many cases, Scout, Rivals, 247Sports, On3, and ESPN may conflict in their listings of height, weight and 40 time.; In these cases, the average was taken. ESPN grades are on a 100-point scale.; Sources: "Florida State 2006 Football Commitments". Rivals.; "2006 Florida State Commits". Scout.; "2006 Player Commitments – Florida State". ESPN.; "Scout.com Team Recruiting Rankings". Scout.; "2006 Team Ranking". Rivals.

=== Injured players ===
Position	Number	Name	Class	Injury (status)	Last update
LB	44	Marcus Ball	Fr.	Torn ACL (out for season)	
RB	27	Russell Ball	Fr.	(out for season)	
DT	91	Emmanuel Dunbar	So.	Back (out indefinitely)	
LB	37	Rodney Gallon	So.	Neck injury (should play in game vs. Wake Forest)	11/10/2006
TE	45	Charlie Graham	Fr.	Sprained ankle (questionable for game vs. Western Michigan)	11/14/2006
DT	54	Paul Griffin	Jr.	Torn ACL (out for season)	
ROV	46	Anthony Houllis	Jr.	Knee (out for season)	
LB/DE	49	Anthony Kelly	Jr.	(out for season)	
DB	4	Mikhal Kornegay	Sr.	Right knee (out for season)	12/11/2006
DB	24	Darius McClure	So.	Dislocated (left) shoulder (out vs. Wake Forest)	11/8/2006
LB	55	Derek Nicholson	So.	Torn ACL (out for season)	
DE	82	D. J. Norris	Jr.	Shoulder (out for season)	11/11/2006
WR	86	Rod Owens	So.	Torn ACL (out for season)	
RB	6	Antone Smith	So.	Dislocated elbow (out for season)	11/18/2006
FB	32	Joe Suratt	Jr.	Right shoulder (out for season)	12/11/2006
LB	51	Jae Thaxton	So.	Concussion (out for season)	11/12/2006
LB	31	Toddrick Verdell	So.	Hamstring (status unknown)	
TE	1	Brandon Warren	Fr.	Hip pointer (will miss game vs. Western Michigan)	11/16/2006

== Awards and honors ==
=== Midseason awards ===
Buster Davis was named as a semifinalist for the Lott Trophy.

==== Postseason awards ====
- Buster Davis named to American Football Coaches Association All-America Team, Walter Camp All-American (2nd Team), Atlantic Coast Sports Media Association All-ACC (1st Team)
- Myron Rolle named Sporting News Freshman ACC Defensive Player of the Year, Sporting News Freshman All-American (1st Team)
- Brandon Warren named to Sporting News Freshman All-ACC Team, Sporting News Freshman All-American (3rd Team)
- Everette Brown named to Sporting News Freshman All-ACC Team, Sporting News Freshman All-American (2nd Team)
- Dekoda Watson named to Sporting News Freshman All-ACC Team
- Jamie Robinson named to Sporting News Freshman All-ACC Team
- Greg Carr named to Atlantic Coast Sports Media Association All-ACC (2nd Team)
- Andre Fluellen named to Atlantic Coast Sports Media Association All-ACC (2nd Team)

== Vacated wins, NCAA probation ==
On March 6, 2009, Florida State was put on probation for four years by National Collegiate Athletic Association for major violations in its athletics program. The school was required to reduce scholarships and vacate records during the 2006 and 2007 seasons. The violations included more than 60 student-athletes across 10 sports involving in the academic fraud, "as well as impermissible benefits, unethical conduct by three former academic support services staff members, and a failure to monitor by the university."
