= 2007 Florida State Seminoles football team =

American college football season

2007 Florida State Seminoles football

Music City Bowl, L 28–35 vs. Kentucky
- Conference: Atlantic Coast Conference
- Atlantic Division
- Record: 0–6, 7 wins vacated (0–4 ACC, 4 wins vacated)
- Head coach: Bobby Bowden (32nd season)
- Offensive coordinator: Jimbo Fisher (1st season)
- Offensive scheme: Pro-style
- Defensive coordinator: Mickey Andrews (24th season)
- Base defense: 4–3
- Captains: De'Cody Fagg; Andre Fluellen; Anthony Houllis
- Home stadium: Doak Campbell Stadium

2007 Atlantic Coast Conference football standings
| | Conf. | | | Overall |
| Team | W | | L | W | | L |
|---|---|---|---|---|---|---|
Atlantic Division
| No. 10 Boston College x | 6 | – | 2 | 11 | – | 3 |
| No. 21 Clemson | 5 | – | 3 | 9 | – | 4 |
| Wake Forest | 5 | – | 3 | 9 | – | 4 |
| Florida State | 4 | – | 4 | 7 | – | 6 |
| Maryland | 3 | – | 5 | 6 | – | 7 |
| NC State | 3 | – | 5 | 5 | – | 7 |
Coastal Division
| No. 9 Virginia Tech x$ | 7 | – | 1 | 11 | – | 3 |
| Virginia | 6 | – | 2 | 9 | – | 4 |
| Georgia Tech | 4 | – | 4 | 7 | – | 6 |
| North Carolina | 3 | – | 5 | 4 | – | 8 |
| Miami (FL) | 2 | – | 6 | 5 | – | 7 |
| Duke | 0 | – | 8 | 1 | – | 11 |
Championship: Virginia Tech 30, Boston College 16
$ – BCS representative as conference champion; % – BCS at-large representative; x – Division champion/co-champions; Rankings from AP Poll

The 2007 Florida State Seminoles football team represented the Florida State University as a member of the Atlantic Coast Conference (ACC) during the 2007 NCAA Division I FBS football season. Led by 32nd-year head coach Bobby Bowden, the Seminoles compiled an overall record of 7–6 with a mark of 4–4 in conference play, placing third in the ACC's Atlantic Division. Florida State was invited to the Music City Bowl, where the Seminoles lost to Kentucky. The team played home games at Doak Campbell Stadium in Tallahassee, Florida.

Florida State late vacated all seven of its wins from the 2007 season as punishment for violations of related to the Florida State University academic-athletic scandal.

== Schedule ==
| Date | Time | Opponent | Rank | Site | TV | Result | Attendance |
|---|---|---|---|---|---|---|---|
| September 3 | 8:00 p.m. | at Clemson | No. 19 | Memorial Stadium; Clemson, SC (rivalry) | ESPN | L 18–24 | 81,993 |
| September 8 | 5:00 p.m. | UAB* | | Doak Campbell Stadium; Tallahassee, FL | ESPNU | W 34–24 (vacated) | 78,673 |
| September 15 | 10:00 p.m. | at Colorado* | | Folsom Field; Boulder, CO | ESPN | W 16–6 (vacated) | 52,951 |
| September 29 | 5:00 p.m. | vs. No. 22 Alabama* | | Jacksonville Municipal Stadium; Jacksonville, FL (River City Showdown) | CBS | W 21–14 (vacated) | 85,412 |
| October 6 | 3:30 p.m. | NC State | | Doak Campbell Stadium; Tallahassee, FL | ABC | W 27–10 (vacated) | 82,214 |
| October 11 | 7:30 p.m. | at Wake Forest | No. 21 | BB&T Field; Winston-Salem, NC | ESPN | L 21–24 | 32,906 |
| October 20 | 3:30 p.m. | Miami (FL) | | Doak Campbell Stadium; Tallahassee, FL (rivalry) | ABC | L 29–37 | 82,728 |
| October 27 | 8:00 p.m. | Duke^{†} | | Doak Campbell Stadium; Tallahassee, FL | ESPNU | W 25–6 (vacated) | 79,159 |
| November 3 | 8:00 p.m. | at No. 2 Boston College | | Alumni Stadium; Chestnut Hill, MA | ABC | W 27–17 (vacated) | 40,065 |
| November 10 | 3:30 p.m. | at No. 11 Virginia Tech | | Lane Stadium; Blacksburg, VA | ABC | L 21–40 | 66,233 |
| November 17 | 12:00 p.m. | Maryland | | Doak Campbell Stadium; Tallahassee, FL | Raycom | W 24–16 (vacated) | 80,213 |
| November 24 | 5:00 p.m. | at No. 12 Florida* | | Ben Hill Griffin Stadium; Gainesville, FL (rivalry) | CBS | L 12–45 | 90,664 |
| December 31 | 4:00 p.m. | vs. Kentucky* | | LP Field; Nashville, TN (Music City Bowl) | ESPN | L 28–35 | 68,661 |
*Non-conference game; ^{†}Homecoming; Rankings from AP Poll released prior to the game; All times are in Eastern time

== Preseason ==
The Seminoles were picked by the ACC media as the preseason favorite to win the ACC's Atlantic Division.

Greg Carr, Andre Fluellen, and Myron Rolle were named to the preseason All-ACC Team. Everette Brown, Jackie Claude, Geno Hayes, and Rolle were named to the Preseason All-ACC Second-Team by Athlon magazine. Tony Carter was named All-ACC Second-Team by The Sporting News and Rivals.com

Tony Carter and Myron Rolle were named to the Jim Thorpe Award watch list. Greg Carr was named to the Maxwell Award watch list. Fluellen, Carter, and Rolle were named to the Chuck Bednarik Award watch list. Fluellen was also name named to the Outland Trophy watch list.

== Game summaries ==
=== Clemson ===
| | 1 | 2 | 3 | 4 | Total |
|---|---|---|---|---|---|
| Florida State | 0 | 3 | 8 | 7 | 18 |
| Clemson | 14 | 10 | 0 | 0 | 24 |

Florida State's terrible first half on both sides of the ball lead to a 24–3 deficit. The Seminoles made adjustments at halftime and swung the momentum in their direction holding Clemson to just 46 yards in the 2nd half. FSU had 196 2nd half yards led by Running Back, Antone Smith. Drew Weatherford and the Seminole offense couldn't shake the Clemson pressure in the second-to-last drive of the game, getting to the Clemson 30-yard line, but falling short of the end zone.

- 2 bomb threats for a building on campus (not the stadium) were emailed to Clemson University Police. As a precaution, extra security was at the stadium.
- Ann Bowden, wife to Bobby (FSU Head Coach) and mother to Tommy (Clemson Head Coach), was not in attendance.
- Florida State Safety, Mister Alexander, tore his ACL during the game and will be out for the rest of the season.
- Clemson jumped from 41 to 25 in the AP Poll and from 35 to 26 in the USA Today Coaches Poll.
- FSU fell from 19 to 36 in the AP Poll and fell from 21 to 38 in the USA Today Coaches Poll.

=== UAB ===
| | 1 | 2 | 3 | 4 | Total |
|---|---|---|---|---|---|
| UAB | 10 | 7 | 7 | 0 | 24 |
| Florida State | 3 | 7 | 21 | 3 | 34 |

The Seminoles got off to another slow start. On Florida State's first drive, Drew Weatherford threw his first interception in 70-plus attempts and it was returned for a touchdown to put UAB up 7–0. The Seminoles scored 21 points in the third quarter to overcome a 17–3 deficit. They won the game, 34–24.

- Antone Smith left the game with a concussion.
- Florida State dropped from the USA Today Coaches Poll.
- Florida State jumped from 36 to 35 in the AP Poll.

=== Colorado ===
| | 1 | 2 | 3 | 4 | Total |
|---|---|---|---|---|---|
| Florida State | 10 | 0 | 3 | 3 | 16 |
| Colorado | 0 | 0 | 0 | 6 | 6 |

The game was mostly a defensive struggle. Late in the 1st quarter, Antone Smith broke away for a 36-yard touchdown run. For the rest of the game, Florida State's offense could not score, even when, at one point, their starting field position was at the Colorado 15-yard line. Instead, they had to settle for three field goals by Gary Cismesia. With 3:40 remaining in the game, Colorado scored a touchdown on a 4th-and-10 play from the Florida State 11-yard line. However, the 2-point conversion attempt failed, and the Seminoles recovered the ensuing onside kick to preserve the victory.

=== Alabama ===
#24 Alabama vs. Florida State

| Team | 1 | 2 | 3 | 4 | Total |
|---|---|---|---|---|---|
| Alabama | 0 | 0 | 0 | 14 | 14 |
| • Florida St | 0 | 0 | 7 | 14 | 21 |

- Date: September 29
- Location: Municipal Stadium
- Game start: 5:00 p.m. EST

Scoring summary
| Q3 | 10:50 | FSU | Fagg 7 yard pass from Lee (Cismesia kick) | FSU 7–0 |
| Q4 | 9:03 | FSU | Smith 5 yard run (Cismesia kick) | FSU 14–0 |
| Q4 | 5:04 | ALA | Hall 7 yard pass from Wilson (Tiffin kick) | FSU 14–7 |
| Q4 | 4:46 | FSU | Fagg 70 yard pass from Lee (Cismesia kick) | FSU 21–7 |
| Q4 | 1:06 | ALA | Brown 17 yard pass from Wilson (Tiffin kick) | FSU 21–14 |

The game got off to another very slow start. It was another first half full of defense. In the 2nd quarter, an ineffective Drew Weatherford was pulled for Xavier Lee. After a halftime score of 0–0, Lee led a strong drive to put FSU up 7–0. After a forced fumble by Everette Brown, a toss sweep to Antone Smith put FSU up 14–0. Alabama's offense took advantage of FSU's prevent defense to score a TD to make it 14–7. Lee then hit Decody Fagg on a 75-yard pass to put FSU up 21–7. Alabama scored late to make it 21–14, but FSU recovered the onside kick, and held on for a 21–14 win.

=== NC State ===
| | 1 | 2 | 3 | 4 | Total |
|---|---|---|---|---|---|
| NC State | 10 | 0 | 0 | 0 | 10 |
| Florida State | 7 | 3 | 7 | 10 | 27 |

Xavier Lee, making his first start of the season at quarterback, ran 2 yards for the Seminoles' first touchdown 2:11 into the game, three plays after a 58-yard pass to Greg Carr on the game's first play. Although N.C. State (1–5, 0–3 ACC) led 10–7 in the first quarter, it was again plagued by four turnovers—boosting its number to 21 in coach Tom O'Brien's first year at the school. Michael Ray Garvin returned an interception 43 yards for a touchdown to spark Florida State's scoring. Garvin, a track All-American who finished sixth in the 100 meters at the NCAA finals and ran a leg on Florida State's championship 400-meter relay team, gave Florida State a 17–10 lead early in the third quarter with his first interception of the season. The game was delayed late in the third quarter for 49 minutes because of a lightning threat. Greg Carr caught a 40-yard touchdown pass early in the fourth quarter to give the Seminoles a 24–10 lead. Daniel Evans was intercepted three times Saturday—once at the end of the half that killed a Wolfpack drive that had reached Florida State's 26. It was the first game against North Carolina State for former Wolfpack coach Chuck Amato, who returned to Florida State to be an assistant after getting fired by N.C. State after last season. The Seminoles snapped a string of eight straight losses against Atlantic Division rivals. N.C. State has now lost a dozen straight game against Bowl Subdivision (formerly I-A) schools.

=== Wake Forest ===
| | 1 | 2 | 3 | 4 | Total |
|---|---|---|---|---|---|
| Florida State | 0 | 14 | 0 | 7 | 21 |
| Wake Forest | 0 | 7 | 7 | 10 | 24 |

Wake Forest's defense in the first half allowed two big plays that set up the Seminoles' two scoring drives, then shut them down after halftime. Wake Forest moved 80 yards in nine plays late in the third quarter to force a 14–14 tie – a drive that started when Alphonso Smith intercepted Lee in the end zone. Skinner capped the drive with a nifty play in which he faked a handoff to Adams, deked like he would roll right and instead reversed field and flipped to the wide-open tailback for a 6-yard score. The Demon Deacons forced five second-half punts, intercepted two passes and allowed 105 total yards after the break – with a good chunk coming after Swank's late kick. Florida State's rushing offense never could get going, finishing with 47 yards on 24 carries. Riley Skinner's 35-yard touchdown pass to Kenneth Moore in the fourth quarter led the Demon Deacons past Florida State 24–21 and helped the sophomore quarterback improve to 2–0 against his home state school that didn't recruit him. Skinner led the Demon Deacons 82 yards in nine plays, converting three third downs during their game-winning drive. The biggest came when Skinner sidestepped a pass rush, stepped forward in the pocket and found Moore, who had a step on cornerback Jamie Robinson at the goal line, for the easy score that put Wake Forest up 21–14 with 6:41 remaining. Florida State gave the ball right back to Wake Forest on the first play of its ensuing drive, when Chip Vaughn intercepted Xavier Lee's deep pass at the 26. The Demon Deacons milked the clock and set up Sam Swank's 48-yard field goal with 1:40 to play that made it a 10-point game. Lee scored on a 17-yard run with 17 seconds left to draw the Seminoles within three, but Wake Forest recovered an onside kick to seal it. The defending league champs rallied in the second half to follow up last year's stunning 30–0 rout in Tallahassee by claiming the first consecutive wins over the Seminoles (4–2, 1–2) in school history.

=== Miami (FL) ===
| | 1 | 2 | 3 | 4 | Total |
|---|---|---|---|---|---|
| Miami | 14 | 3 | 7 | 13 | 37 |
| Florida State | 10 | 10 | 6 | 3 | 29 |

Florida State and Miami both entered this game unranked for the first time since 1977. The teams exchanged turnovers (nine total, five by FSU) and scores, keeping things close for most of the game. With 5:29 left in the fourth quarter, the Hurricanes, trailing 29–24, appeared to have lost their best chance to win when Kirby Freeman was stopped for no gain on a fourth-and-1 at the Florida State 1. But Freeman, who replaced injured Kyle Wright in the first half, drove Miami 83 yards in under two minutes to take the lead 30–29 on a 13-yard pass to Dedrick Epps with 1:15 left. FSU quarterback Xavier Lee, who was intercepted twice, then fumbled after being hit by Miami's Teraz McCray, and Colin McCarthy ran it in for the clincher. This was the first game since 2001 that was decided by more than a touchdown.

=== Duke ===
| | 1 | 2 | 3 | 4 | Total |
|---|---|---|---|---|---|
| Duke | 0 | 0 | 0 | 6 | 6 |
| Florida State | 3 | 6 | 13 | 3 | 25 |

Florida State led 9–0 at halftime on three field goals by Gary Cismesia. After going more than five quarters without an offensive touchdown, the Seminoles made it to the end zone six minutes into the third quarter when Parker raced 9 yards with a short sideline pass from Drew Weatherford, giving Florida State a 16–0 lead. Parker scored his second TD late in the third quarter on a 14-yard run to make the score 22–0. After Cismesia kicked his fourth field goal, Duke (1–7, 0–5 ACC) avoided a shutout when Thaddeus Lewis lofted a 3-yard pass to a wide-open Brandon King in the right front corner of the end zone with 8:07 left. Florida State (5–3, 2–3 ACC) rolled up a season-high 534 yards and 30 first downs while holding Duke to 222 yards and 9 first downs. The Blue Devils managed only 49 yards and two first downs in the first half. Patrick Robinson had an interception for the fourth straight game. Florida State ended a two-game losing streak with a 25–6 victory over Duke, handing the Blue Devils' their 22nd straight Atlantic Coast Conference loss.

=== Boston College ===
| | 1 | 2 | 3 | 4 | Total |
|---|---|---|---|---|---|
| Florida State | 0 | 7 | 3 | 17 | 27 |
| Boston College | 0 | 0 | 7 | 10 | 17 |

The game began in a frigid and soaking downpour, with wind gusts forecast at up to 50 mph as the remnants of Hurricane Noel proceeded up the East Coast. The rain had stopped by the end of the first quarter, but the winds battered the U.S. flag and played havoc with a couple of second-quarter field goal attempts. Drew Weatherford completed 29-of-45 passes for 354 yards for Florida State (6–3, 3–3), hitting Preston Parker nine times for 93 yards and a touchdown and De'Cody Fagg on six catches for 111 yards and a TD. Matt Ryan finished 25-for-53 for two touchdowns and 415 yards—his fourth career 400-yard game, tying Doug Flutie for the most in school history, but his interceptions were costly. Ryan was picked off once in the first quarter inside the Seminoles 10 by Patrick Robinson, making this his fifth consecutive game recovering an interception. Ryan also threw an interception early in the third that allowed Florida State to move into position for a 40-yard field goal that made it 10–0. Ryan led BC on a four-play, 70-yard drive over 63 seconds, hitting Ryan Purvis for 26 yards to the Florida State 30, and then Brandon Robinson for the touchdown. The teams traded field goals, then Weatherford hit Fagg on a 42-yard touchdown pass to give the Seminoles a 20–10 lead. Ryan hit Rich Gunnell on a 42-yard pass to the Florida State 6 with 7:24 left. Two plays later, including a penalty that moved the ball to the 3, Ryan hit a wide-open Purvis in the middle of the end zone to make it 20–17. BC forced a punt and got the ball back at its own 7 with 3:30 left and a chance to take the lead. Ryan moved the Eagles out to the 33 before Hayes ripped the ball free from Purvis on a pass across the middle. Geno Hayes returned Matt Ryan's third interception for a 38-yard touchdown with 1:10 to play to help Florida State beat second-ranked Boston College 27–17, ending the Eagles' run at an unbeaten season.

=== Virginia Tech ===
| | 1 | 2 | 3 | 4 | Total |
|---|---|---|---|---|---|
| Florida State | 6 | 0 | 15 | 0 | 21 |
| Virginia Tech | 6 | 14 | 0 | 20 | 40 |

Christian Ponder had a solid showing after taking over for the injured Drew Weatherford, until the 4th quarter when he lost a fumble and threw two consecutive interceptions, which sealed the loss for the Seminoles. Emergency quarterback D'Vontrey Richardson came in for just one snap late in the 4th and was brought down in the endzone for a safety.

=== Maryland ===
| | 1 | 2 | 3 | 4 | Total |
|---|---|---|---|---|---|
| Maryland | 3 | 3 | 7 | 3 | 16 |
| Florida State | 14 | 7 | 0 | 3 | 24 |

=== Florida ===
| | 1 | 2 | 3 | 4 | Total |
|---|---|---|---|---|---|
| Florida State | 3 | 9 | 0 | 0 | 12 |
| Florida | 14 | 10 | 7 | 14 | 45 |

=== Kentucky—Music City Bowl ===
| | 1 | 2 | 3 | 4 | Total |
|---|---|---|---|---|---|
| Kentucky | 7 | 7 | 14 | 7 | 35 |
| Florida State | 7 | 7 | 0 | 14 | 28 |

The Seminoles entered the game without 34 players due to a various injuries, violating of team rules, and a large academic cheating scandal.

== Personnel ==
=== Coaching staff ===
- Head coach: Bobby Bowden
- Offensive coordinator, quarterbacks coach: Jimbo Fisher
- Associate head coach, defensive coordinator: Mickey Andrews
- Executive head coach, linebackers: Chuck Amato
- Assistant head coach, offensive Line: Rick Trickett
- Defensive ends, special teams coordinator: Jody Allen
- Tight ends, recruiting coordinator: John Lilly
- Wide Receivers: Lawrence Dawsey
- Running backs: Dexter Carter
- Defensive tackles: Odell Haggins
- Strength and conditioning : Todd Stroud
- Graduate assistant, defensive backs: Terrell Buckley
- Graduate assistantL Jason Woodman

=== Starting lineup ===
Offense

| Position | Number | Name | Class |
|---|---|---|---|
| QB | 11 | Drew Weatherford | RS Jr. |
| RB | 6 | Antone Smith | Jr. |
| FB | 35 | Marcus Sims | So. |
| WR | 81 | De'Cody Fagg | Sr. |
| WR | 9 | Richard Goodman | Jr. |
| TE | 45 | Charlie Graham | RS So. |
| LT | 76 | Daron Rose | So. |
| LG | 68 | Jacky Claude | Sr. |
| C | 67 | Ryan McMahon | RS Fr. |
| RG | 79 | David Overmyer | RS Sr. |
| RT | 73 | Shannon Boatman | RS Sr. |

Defense

Base defense: 4–3 multiple

| Position | Number | Name | Class |
|---|---|---|---|
| DE | 59 | Neefy Moffett | Jr. |
| NT | 96 | Andre Fluellen | RS Sr. |
| T | 93 | Letroy Guion | Jr. |
| DE | 98 | Alex Boston | RS Sr. |
| WLB | 10 | Geno Hayes | Jr. |
| MLB | 30 | Derek Nicholson | Jr. |
| SLB | 36 | Dekoda Watson | So. |
| CB | 4 | Tony Carter | RS Jr. |
| ROV | 3 | Myron Rolle | So. |
| FS | 8 | Roger Williams | RS Sr. |
| CB | 21 | Patrick Robinson | |

Special teams

| Position | Number | Name | Class |
|---|---|---|---|
| K | 12 | Gary Cismesia | Sr. |
| KR | 29 | Michael Ray Garvin | Jr. |
| KR | 5 | Preston Parker | So. |
| P | 43 | Graham Gano | Jr. |
| PR | 5 | Preston Parker | So. |
| LS | 65 | Garrison Sanborn | RS Sr. |

=== Recruits ===
College recruiting
| Name | Hometown | School | Height | Weight | 40^{‡} | Commit date |
|---|---|---|---|---|---|---|
| Dionte Allen; DB | Orchard Lake, Michigan | St. Mary's Preparatory | 5 ft 11 in (1.80 m) | 175 lb (79 kg) | 4.4 | Aug 9, 2006 |
| Dionte Allen; DB | Recruit ratings: Scout: Rivals: (81) | | | | | |
| Bernard Brinson; DB | Greenville, Florida | Madison County HS | 5 ft 10 in (1.78 m) | 170 lb (77 kg) | 4.6 | Oct 22, 2006 |
| Bernard Brinson; DB | Recruit ratings: Scout: Rivals: (N/A) | | | | | |
| Brian Coulter; DE | Poplarville, Mississippi | Pearl River Community College | 6 ft 4 in (1.93 m) | 255 lb (116 kg) | N/A | Nov 5, 2006 |
| Brian Coulter; DE | Recruit ratings: Scout: Rivals: (N/A) | | | | | |
| Willis Williams; ATH | Stone Mountain, Georgia | Stephenson HS | 5 ft 9 in (1.75 m) | 195 lb (88 kg) | 4.34 | Mar 1, 2007 |
| Willis Williams; ATH | Recruit ratings: Scout: Rivals: (75) | | | | | |
| Will Furlong; OL | DeLand, Florida | DeLand HS | 6 ft 5 in (1.96 m) | 275 lb (125 kg) | 4.9 | Jul 22, 2006 |
| Will Furlong; OL | Recruit ratings: Scout: Rivals: (77) | | | | | |
| A.J. Ganguzza; OL | Boca Raton, Florida | West Boca Raton HS | 6 ft 3 in (1.91 m) | 260 lb (120 kg) | 5.5 | Jan 29, 2007 |
| A.J. Ganguzza; OL | Recruit ratings: Scout: Rivals: (69) | | | | | |
| Antwane Greenlee; OL | Columbus, Georgia | Hardaway HS | 6 ft 6 in (1.98 m) | 302 lb (137 kg) | 5.1 | Feb 7, 2007 |
| Antwane Greenlee; OL | Recruit ratings: Scout: Rivals: (78) | | | | | |
| Aaron Gresham; LB | Mayo, Florida | Lafayette HS | 6 ft 2 in (1.88 m) | 222 lb (101 kg) | 4.6 | Jan 21, 2007 |
| Aaron Gresham; LB | Recruit ratings: Scout: Rivals: (74) | | | | | |
| Anthony Grosso; OL | Matawan, New Jersey | Matawan Regional HS | 6 ft 6 in (1.98 m) | 290 lb (130 kg) | 5.1 | Jan 22, 2007 |
| Anthony Grosso; OL | Recruit ratings: Scout: Rivals: (40) | | | | | |
| Jonathan Hannah; TE | Louisburg, North Carolina | Louisburg HS | 6 ft 4 in (1.93 m) | 260 lb (120 kg) | 4.8 | Feb 8, 2007 |
| Jonathan Hannah; TE | Recruit ratings: Scout: Rivals: (40) | | | | | |
| Maurice Harris; LB | Homestead, Florida | Homestead Senior HS | 6 ft 1 in (1.85 m) | 189 lb (86 kg) | 4.5 | Feb 7, 2007 |
| Maurice Harris; LB | Recruit ratings: Scout: Rivals: (77) | | | | | |
| Zach Hillery; OL | Chatham, Virginia | Hargrave Military Academy | 6 ft 4 in (1.93 m) | 315 lb (143 kg) | 4.9 | Sep 18, 2006 |
| Zach Hillery; OL | Recruit ratings: Scout: Rivals: (40) | | | | | |
| Rodney Hudson; OL | Mobile, AL | Ben C Rain HS | 6 ft 2 in (1.88 m) | 276 lb (125 kg) | 5.2 | Jan 31, 2007 |
| Rodney Hudson; OL | Recruit ratings: Scout: Rivals: (77) | | | | | |
| Jamar Jackson; DE | Richmond, Virginia | Varina HS | 6 ft 4 in (1.93 m) | 225 lb (102 kg) | 4.7 | Dec 15, 2006 |
| Jamar Jackson; DE | Recruit ratings: Scout: Rivals: (74) | | | | | |
| Jatavious Jackson; OL | Belle Glade, Florida | Glades Central HS | 6 ft 4 in (1.93 m) | 270 lb (120 kg) | N/A | Feb 7, 2007 |
| Jatavious Jackson; OL | Recruit ratings: Scout: Rivals: (N/A) | | | | | |
| Chad Carlsen; ATH | Baltimore, MD | Glen Burnie HS | 6 ft 2 in (1.88 m) | 200 lb (91 kg) | 4.4 | Jun 7, 2007 |
| Chad Carlsen; ATH | Recruit ratings: Scout: Rivals: (N/A) | | | | | |
| Shawn Powell; K | Rome, Georgia | Darlington HS | 6 ft 5 in (1.96 m) | 215 lb (98 kg) | N/A | Feb 5, 2007 |
| Shawn Powell; K | Recruit ratings: Scout: Rivals: (40) | | | | | |
| Bert Reed; ATH | Panama City, Florida | Bay HS | 5 ft 11 in (1.80 m) | 165 lb (75 kg) | 4.4 | Feb 5, 2007 |
| Bert Reed; ATH | Recruit ratings: Scout: Rivals: (79) | | | | | |
| Kendall Smith; LB | Bushnell, Florida | South Sumter HS | 6 ft 1 in (1.85 m) | 207 lb (94 kg) | 4.5 | Jul 16, 2006 |
| Kendall Smith; LB | Recruit ratings: Scout: Rivals: (79) | | | | | |
| Cameron Wade; WR | Cairo, Georgia | Cairo HS | 6 ft 5 in (1.96 m) | 180 lb (82 kg) | 4.5 | Jul 11, 2006 |
| Cameron Wade; WR | Recruit ratings: Scout: Rivals: (76) | | | | | |
Overall recruit ranking:
‡ Refers to 40-yard dash; Note: In many cases, Scout, Rivals, 247Sports, On3, and ESPN may conflict in their listings of height, weight and 40 time.; In these cases, the average was taken. ESPN grades are on a 100-point scale.; Sources: "Florida State 2007 Football Commitments". Rivals.; "2007 Florida State Commits". Scout.; "2007 Player Commitments – Florida State". ESPN.; "Scout.com Team Recruiting Rankings". Scout.; "2007 Team Ranking". Rivals.com.

=== Injured players ===
| Position | Number | Name | Class | Injury (status) | Last update |
|---|---|---|---|---|---|
| FB | 32 | Joe Surratt | Sr | Fractured right fibula (out indefinitely) | August 18, 2007 |
| LB | 55 | Jamar Jackson | Fr | Torn ACL (out for the season) | August 30, 2007 |
| S | 47 | Mister Alexander | RS Fr | Torn ACL (Out for the Season) | September 5, 2007 |
| RB | 33 | Jamaal Edwards | Jr | Left shoulder (out indefinitely) | November 10, 2007 |
| WR | 9 | Richard Goodman | Jr | Lower leg fracture (out indefinitely) | October 29, 2007 |

== Awards and honors ==
=== Midseason awards ===
- Myron Rolle was named to the CoSIDA Academic All-District Team.
- Gary Cismesia was named as a semifinalist for the Lou Groza Award.
