= 2007 Music City Bowl =

2007 Gaylord Hotels Music City Bowl presented by Bridgestone
- 10th Music City Bowl
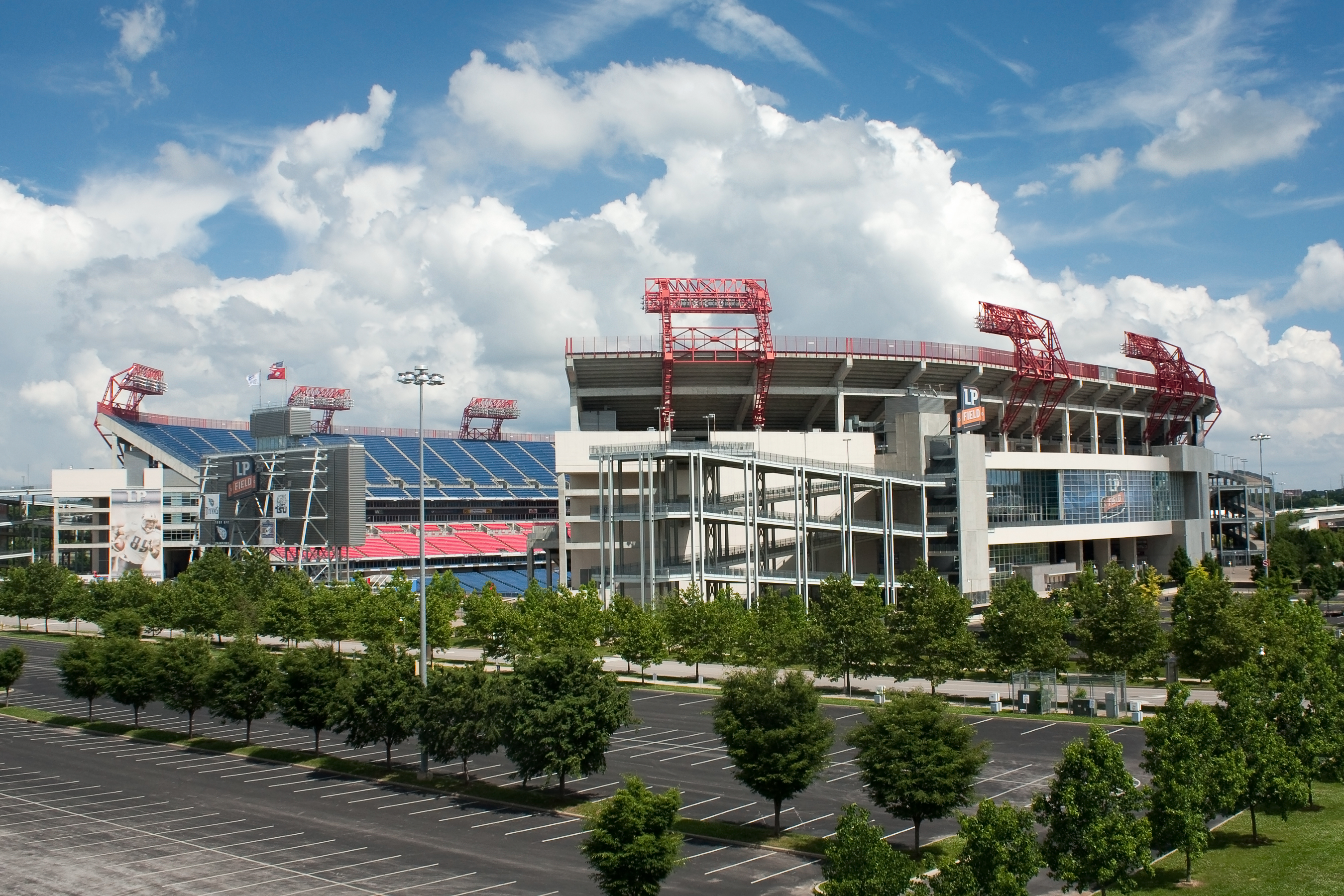
- LP Field in Nashville, Tennessee, hosted the Music City Bowl.
Kentucky Wildcats	Florida State Seminoles
(7–5)	(7–5)
SEC	ACC
35	28
Head coach: Rich Brooks	Head coach: Bobby Bowden
	1	2	3	4	Total
Kentucky	7	7	14	7	35
Florida State	7	7	0	14	28
- Date: December 31, 2007
- Season: 2007
- Stadium: LP Field
- Location: Nashville, Tennessee
- MVP: Kentucky QB André Woodson
- Favorite: Kentucky by 9
- Referee: Jerry McGinn (Big East)
- Attendance: 68,661
- Payout: US$1,600,000 per team

United States TV coverage
- Network: ESPN
- Announcers: Ron Franklin (Play by Play); Ed Cunningham (Analyst); Jack Arute (Sideline)

The 2007 Music City Bowl was the 10th edition of the Music City Bowl, and it was played on December 31, 2007. Part of the 2007–2008 bowl season, it featured the Kentucky Wildcats and the Florida State Seminoles. Sponsored by Gaylord Hotels and Bridgestone, it was officially named the Gaylord Hotels Music City Bowl presented by Bridgestone.

== Background ==
Both teams entered the game with a 7–5 overall record and a 4–4 conference record; Florida State had been ranked as high as #19 in the season's AP polls, appearing in the rankings for two weeks that season. Kentucky had been ranked as high as #8 (twice) in the season's AP polls and had been ranked for eight weeks during the season.

The Seminoles came into the game without 34 players due to various injuries, violations of team rules, and a large academic cheating scandal. For the Wildcats, this was déjà vu all over again, as they had played in the prior year's edition of the game, entered it with the same 7–5 overall record, and faced an Atlantic Coast Conference team coached by a Bowden, namely the Clemson team coached by Tommy Bowden, son of longtime FSU head coach Bobby Bowden.

== Game recap ==
In the first quarter, Kentucky scored first on a 14-yard André Woodson touchdown pass to tight end Jacob Tamme. Florida State quarterback Drew Weatherford then scored on a 6-yard touchdown run. Kentucky built a 14–7 lead in the second quarter on a 13-yard touchdown pass from Woodson to Steve Johnson. Kentucky's defense then held Florida State to a turnover on downs inside the Kentucky five yard line, but immediately after that Florida State tied the game before halftime when Tony Carter intercepted a Woodson pass and returned it 24 yards for a touchdown.

Kentucky struck first in the third quarter when Woodson threw a 2-yard touchdown pass to Rafael Little. A 4-yard touchdown run by Tony Dixon boosted Kentucky's third quarter lead to 28–14. Florida State scored first in the fourth quarter with a 1-yard Weatherford touchdown run to make it 28–21. Woodson's 38-yard touchdown pass to Steve Johnson extended the Kentucky lead to 35–21. The game's final score was a 7-yard touchdown pass from Weatherford to Greg Carr to bring about the final tally: Kentucky 35, Florida State 28. The game appeared iced when Kentucky linebacker Micah Johnson intercepted a Weatherford pass with less than one minute remaining, but in attempting to return the interception Johnson fumbled the ball away and Florida State recovered. Florida State threw a pass into the end zone at the end of regulation but Kentucky defenders batted it down to seal the win.

The attendance of 68,661 set a new record for the Music City Bowl.

In Kentucky's 35–28 victory, 2006 game MVP André Woodson repeated as the 2007 MVP after throwing four touchdown passes. Florida State's Antone Smith gained a career-high 156 rushing yards; Kentucky's Rafael Little rushed for 152 yards and caught one touchdown pass, but he also fumbled twice. The win gave the Wildcats back-to-back bowl wins for the first time since 1952. It was also the first loss ever for the elder Bowden in a December bowl game.
