= Florida State University academic-athletic scandal =

Scandal involving student athletes at Florida State University

In 2007, administrators at Florida State University publicly announced that an internal investigation had uncovered evidence that multiple student athletes had engaged in academic dishonesty. These findings were corroborated by another investigation conducted by the National Collegiate Athletic Association (NCAA) that implicated 61 athletes in multiple different sports. As a result of the scandal, the NCAA levied several punishments against the university. Sports journalist Mark Schlabach has called the incident "Florida State's biggest scandal".

The issue first came to light in early 2007, when administrators were notified that a learning specialist within the athletics department may have facilitated cheating on an online quiz. Following a multi-month investigation, the university found evidence that 23 student athletes in 9 different sports had engaged in academic dishonesty. The university reported their findings to the NCAA, who then conducted their own investigation. Following this later investigation, which concluded in 2009, the NCAA found that 61 athletes, including 25 members of the football team, had been involved in a cheating scheme involving a music history class. As punishment, the NCAA reduced the number of athletic scholarships that Florida State could offer by 17, applied a show-cause penalty against several individuals involved in the scandal, and vacated victories in several sports where ineligible athletes had participated. This included a vacation of 12 wins by the football team. While the university attempted to appeal the vacated victories, the NCAA upheld their ruling.

== Background ==
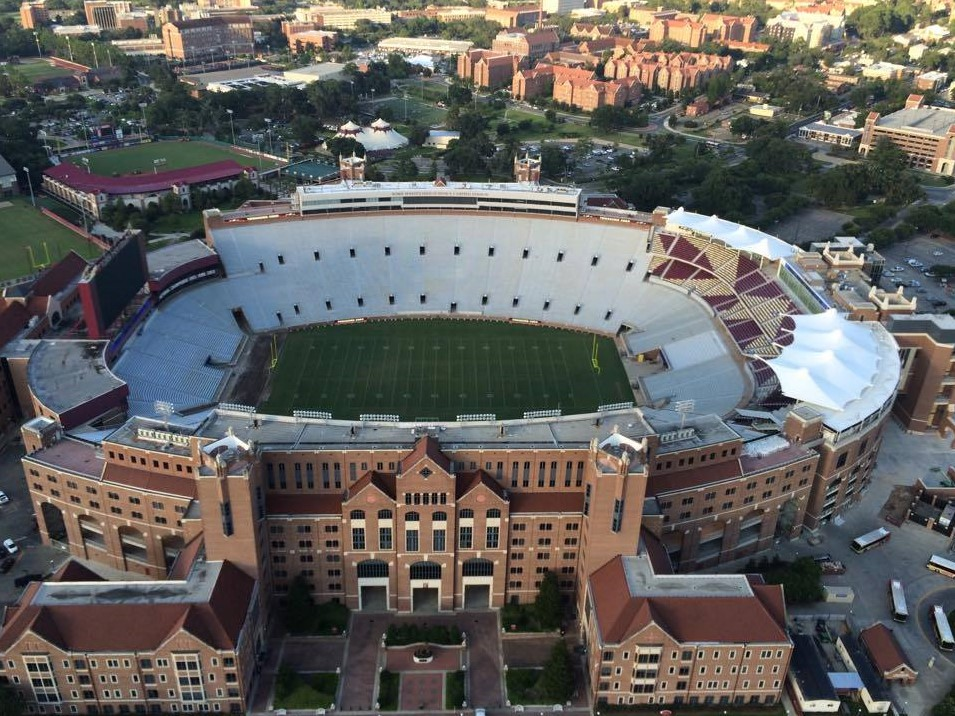
Doak Campbell Stadium on the campus of Florida State University, 2017

Florida State University (FSU) is a public university in Tallahassee, Florida. Since the early 1990s, the university's athletic teams, known as the Florida State Seminoles, have competed in the Atlantic Coast Conference (ACC), with their football team beginning conference play in 1992. The football program is well known for its on-field success, with The New York Times describing it as a "powerhouse". Between 1992 and 2000, the Seminoles football team had either outright won or shared the ACC championship every year, and both the 1993 and 1999 teams were considered national champions. Additionally, Bobby Bowden, Florida State's long-time head coach, was one of the winningest coaches in college football.

== Initial investigation ==
=== Allegations of academic dishonesty ===
On March 28, 2007, administrators at FSU were made aware that Brenda Monk, a learning specialist within the athletics department, had possibly engaged in academic dishonesty. This occurred after they had received information that Monk had directed a student athlete to take an online quiz and then gave that student's answers to another student athlete. Both of the athletes were members of the men's basketball team. The student who had taken the exam, who was not enrolled in the class which the quiz was assigned in, reported the incident to his academic advisor. Several days later, on April 3, Monk, a person who The Ledger referred to as "[t]he No. 2 person in the academic support program", was placed on administrative leave. Several weeks later, T. K. Wetherell, the president of FSU, ordered the university's Office of Audit Services to open an investigation into possible academic dishonesty within the athletics department. (Note: Sources differ on exactly when Wetherell initiated the investigation. A 2007 Associated Press report that was published on CBS News's website states that Wetherell initiated the investigation in May 2007. However, a 2009 article in the Tampa Bay Times gives an exact date of April 17, 2007, as when Wetherell initiated the investigation.) As part of the investigation, FSU officials hired an outside law firm to assist them, and they also worked with officials from both the ACC and the National Collegiate Athletic Association (NCAA). In total, the investigation lasted about six months.

In May, two assistant athletic directors announced that they would be resigning, and in late May, David Hart Jr., the head athletic director for the university, was notified that his contract with the university would not be renewed. His contract ran until January 2009, but according to The Ledger newspaper, he was expected to leave the university by the end of the year. Additionally, effective July 5, Monk resigned. She had been employed by the university for about six years prior to this. Around the same time, a student tutor also resigned.

=== Findings ===
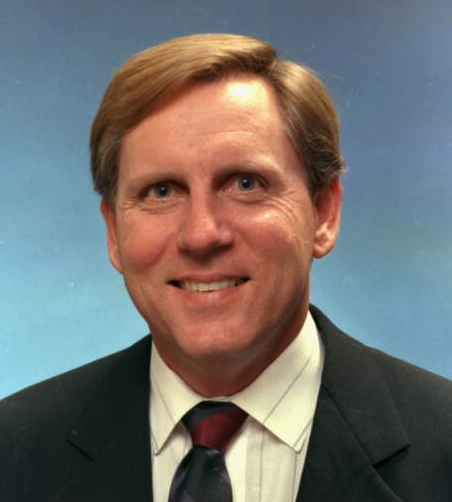
T. K. Wetherell (pictured 1989), the president of FSU in 2007

On September 25, the university submitted a letter regarding the initial findings of their investigation to the NCAA. University officials publicly announced the findings the following day. In total, the investigation implicated 23 student athletes, including 17 on athletic scholarships, in 9 different sports as having participated in academic dishonesty. While the athletes' names and other private information was withheld due to federal privacy laws, the Tallahassee Democrat newspaper reported that 11 of the athletes were starters on the football team.

Per the investigation, the academic dishonesty occurred in one course, which the university did not publicly disclose. The university found that neither of the two student athletes involved in the initial academic dishonesty case in May were disciplined. The learning specialist who had orchestrated that incident had also typed papers for five student athletes as part of a program that they did not qualify for, and they had also failed to properly direct student athletes who had disabilities to the university's Student Disability Resource Center, where they could have received legitimate aid. Additionally, the investigation showed that a tutor had engaged in unethical aid to 23 student athletes, which included providing answers for tests that were taken via the Internet. According to Provost Lawrence G. Abele, the tutor had completed online assignments for students who were not present in the classroom. The tutor told investigators that they had been engaging in academic dishonesty since the Fall 2006 semester. According to the investigators, "Some students from the 2007 semester indicated that it was common knowledge among the student athletes that the tutor would help with the exams in the class". However, Wetherell stated that no coaches were involved in the scandal.

=== Impact ===
CBS News reported that, as a result of the findings, some student athletes could possibly lose their player eligibility. Additionally, the NCAA could levy sanctions against FSU, though at the time, a spokesperson for the NCAA declined to say which course of action the association would take against the university, if any. In November, the university and the NCAA agreed to suspend any player involved in the scandal for 30 percent of their season.

Initially, the football team suspended two players as a result of their involvement in the scandal. Joslin Shaw, a wide receiver, was not able to play in the first four games of the season, while Kevin McNeill, a defensive end, did not participate in any games of the season. The team completed their regular season with a win-loss record of 7–5 and was invited to participate in the 2007 Music City Bowl. By early December, new reports on the scandal indicated that the number of football players involved ranged from between 12 and 20 people. On December 18, Bowden stated that up to 25 players could be barred from participating in the bowl game. While some were expected to be suspended due to non-scandal related incidents, many of the suspensions were related to the investigation. According to Bleacher Report, the additional suspensions were due to new findings that several football players had initially lied to investigators and only later told the truth regarding their involvement in the scandal after they discovered that they could lose their eligibility if their dishonesty was revealed. Due in part to the suspensions, which included several members of the team's starting lineup, the Seminoles lost the bowl game to the Kentucky Wildcats. In addition to the bowl game suspension, about ten of the players were also suspended for the first three games of the following season, and The New York Times reported that the NCAA could possibly vacate victories that the Seminoles had achieved.

== NCAA investigation ==
Following the conclusion of FSU's internal investigation, the NCAA launched its own investigation. In a report made public on March 6, 2009, the NCAA stated that they had found that 61 athletes in various sports—including 25 football players—had participated in the cheating scandal, either by cheating in an online test or by receiving improper aid. The investigation revealed that much of the cheating occurred with regards to an online test in a music history class—Music of World Cultures—during the Fall 2006, Spring 2007, and Summer 2007 semesters. According to journalist Andrew Carter of the Orlando Sentinel, the class had a reputation as an easy course that could help boost a student's grade point average. In describing the case, the NCAA said that it was "extremely serious" and that the student athletes' actions constituted "major violations" of NCAA rules. As with FSU's internal investigation, the NCAA found no evidence that coaches were aware of or engaged in any academic dishonesty. In total, ten programs were found to have had student athletes involved in the scandal:

- Baseball
- Football
- Softball
- Men's basketball
- Men's golf
- Men's swimming
- Men's track and field
- Women's basketball
- Women's swimming
- Women's track and field

As a result, the NCAA stated that they would be vacating wins for every instance that an ineligible player had participated in, place the university on a probation until March 5, 2013, and place restrictions on the number of athletic scholarships that the university could award. Ultimately, the NCAA reduced the overall number of scholarships by 17. Additionally, the NCAA levied a show-cause penalty against three individuals, ranging from three to five years: Monk, Hillard Goldsmith (a former academic advisor), and an unnamed student tutor. In their report, the association also noted that they "[reserved] the right to review and reconsider the penalties" in the event of an appeal, which could include levying additional penalties against the university. For the football program, which the NCAA usually allows to award a maximum of 85 scholarships, Florida State self-imposed a limit of 83 for the 2008–09 academic year and 82 for 2009–10. In addition, the NCAA also limited the university to 84 for the 2010–2011 year. However, the NCAA stopped short of placing any restrictions on Florida State's ability to play in postseason bowl games or from having their games televised, prompting journalist Gene Frenette of The Florida Times-Union to say that the university "got off fairly light on the punishment meter".

In addition, the NCAA reported that they may vacate as many as 14 wins from both the 2006 and 2007 seasons. Vacated victories in other sports could also include the 2006 and 2007 national championships won by the men's track and field team. Additionally, the vacated wins would affect Bowden's chances of being the winningest coach in NCAA Division I, as at the time, he was only one win short of the top spot held by Joe Paterno of the Penn State Nittany Lions. On March 17, 2009, President Wetherell held a press conference where he stated that the university had hired an attorney and would be appealing the NCAA's decision to vacate wins as a form of punishment. During the conference, Wetherell called the punishment "inappropriate", "unwarranted", and "excessive", because it punished several hundred athletes and coaches who were not involved in the scandal. The university stated that the vacated victories would be the only punishment they would be appealing, as they accepted both the scholarship reductions and probation.

=== Lawsuit by news organizations ===
On June 15, 2009, over a dozen news organizations, including the Associated Press,The Florida Times-Union, and the Orlando Sentinel, filed a lawsuit against Florida State and the NCAA in a circuit court in Tallahassee, alleging that the two organizations violated open government laws by not making certain correspondences between the two parties publicly available. Specifically, the lawsuit states that the NCAA's response to FSU's appeal was not made available to the public and that public records requests to view the document had been denied. In their complaint, the news organizations stated:

The law firm GrayRobinson, as FSU's attorney and agent, has entered into a 'web custodial confidentiality agreement' as required by the NCAA. It accessed and reviewed this public record and communicated its contents to FSU officials. By entering into this scheme, the NCAA and FSU have evaded Florida's Public Records Act and deprived the citizens of Florida of information of significant public concern.

In response, officials from FSU stated that they had previously requested the NCAA to publicly release their response, which they did not. The following day, the NCAA stated that, while it did not consider its letter to the university to be a public record, it would allow the university to release a redacted and retyped version of its letter. A spokesperson for Florida Attorney General Bill McCollum called the NCAA's act "a step in the right direction". McCollum had previously written to NCAA President Myles Brand to say that the association could face possible criminal penalization over the case. On July 24, the university also filed a lawsuit against the NCAA seeking to force the association to allow the university to release their records in accordance with Florida's public records laws. At a hearing on August 20, the NCAA argued that the guarantee of confidentially was necessary to conduct investigations into cheating at universities and that the precedence that could be set if the FSU documents were to be declared public documents and released would seriously hinder their ability to carry out future investigations. On August 28, the judge overseeing the case ruled against the NCAA and ordered the organization to release the documents to the public. However, on September 1, the court ordered a temporary stay of execution. The NCAA's documents pertaining to the FSU scandal were released on October 14. A motion filed by the NCAA later that month for another stay was denied by the court.

=== Later developments in 2009 ===
On November 15, representatives from FSU argued before a committee of the NCAA at the association's headquarters in Indianapolis against their decision to vacate wins as a punishment. The hearing was the last held by the NCAA before they made their final decision on the matter. That same month, the Tampa Bay Times reported that Monk had initiated a lawsuit against FSU for defamation and was seeking $600,000 (equivalent to $900,000 in 2025) in damages.

== Aftermath ==
=== Bowden's retirement ===
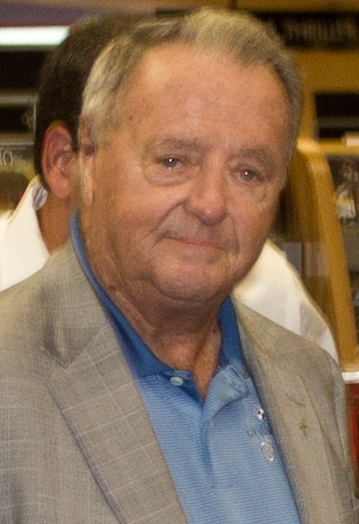
Bobby Bowden (pictured 2010) resigned as head coach of the football team at the end of the 2009 season.

On November 30, Bleacher Report published an article stating that "various reports" had claimed that Wetherell and Randy Spetman, FSU's new athletic director, had met with Bowden and discussed his future with the football team. According to the article, Bowden was given an ultimatum to either retire or return the following season as a head coach in name only, with offensive coordinator Jimbo Fisher assuming all of the responsibilities of the head coach. Similar reporting of an ultimatum situation was reported by journalist Andy Staples of Sports Illustrated, who further stated that it had been Bowden's wish to return to coach the team for the 2010 season. On December 1, Bowden announced that he would be retiring at the end of the season, following their bowl game. In a 2010 interview with the Associated Press, Bowden further stated that he had been "pushed out" of the coaching position, with Wetherell confirming that it had been his decision to remove Bowden.

=== Outside the Lines report ===
On December 13, ESPN aired a report on their sports news show Outside the Lines about the scandal at FSU. The report alleged that the university had admitted athletes who did not have a good academic record and proceeded to classify these athletes as "learning disabled" in order to keep the athletes eligible for participating in intercollegiate sports. Prior to the airing of the episode, the university had attempted to dissuade the channel from airing it, with Wetherell calling the claims made in the episode "totally misleading". Both Wetherell and Bowden declined to be involved in the episode.

The episode featured interviews with both Monk and Fred Rouse, a former wide receiver for the Seminoles football team. Monk stated that, while at FSU, she worked with 65 athletes who had been classified as "learning disabled" and described a system where the athletes are allowed to pass in order to maintain their eligibility. Monk also stated that over one-third of the football team and three-quarters of the men's basketball team were classified as having learning disabilities, compared to between 5 and 10 percent of the average adult population. Rouse stated in his interview, "You [as a high school athlete] have all of this time to prepare [academically] before you get to this level, and then when you get here, you play this punk role as, you know, 'I have a learning disability', when that's not the case".

=== Vacated wins ===
On January 5, 2010, the NCAA announced that its decision to vacate wins in which ineligible student athletes participated had been upheld and that it was still reviewing which wins would be vacated. On February 7, they announced that they had concluded their review and would be vacating wins in the following sports:

- Baseball: Four wins from the 2006–07 season, including their wins in the 2007 NCAA Division I baseball tournament.
- Football: Five wins from the 2006 season (including the 2006 Emerald Bowl), seven wins from the 2007 season.
- Men's basketball: All 22 wins from the 2006–07 season, including two wins in the 2007 National Invitation Tournament.
- Softball: 32 wins from the 2006–07 season, including 2 wins in the ACC softball tournament.
- Women's basketball: 16 wins from the 2006–07 season (including two wins in the 2007 NCAA Division I women's basketball tournament), six wins from the 2007–08 season.

Additional vacated wins were also applied to the men's golf program, the men's and women's swimming and diving programs, men's and women's cross country, and men's and women's track and field. With the vacated wins, Bowden's NCAA-recognized total win record became 377, including 304 at FSU, placing him in second place behind Paterno.

=== Retrospective ===
The academic dishonesty scandal at Florida State was one of several that was investigated by the NCAA during the 2000s. In a 2021 article on ESPN.com, sports journalist Mark Schlabach called the incident "Florida State's biggest scandal", and several news sources have discussed the scandal in lists of major academic scandals at universities in the United States. Following the University of North Carolina academic-athletic scandal in 2010, several sources drew comparisons between that scandal and the one that had occurred at FSU several years prior.
