= Christian Ponder =

American football player (born 1988)

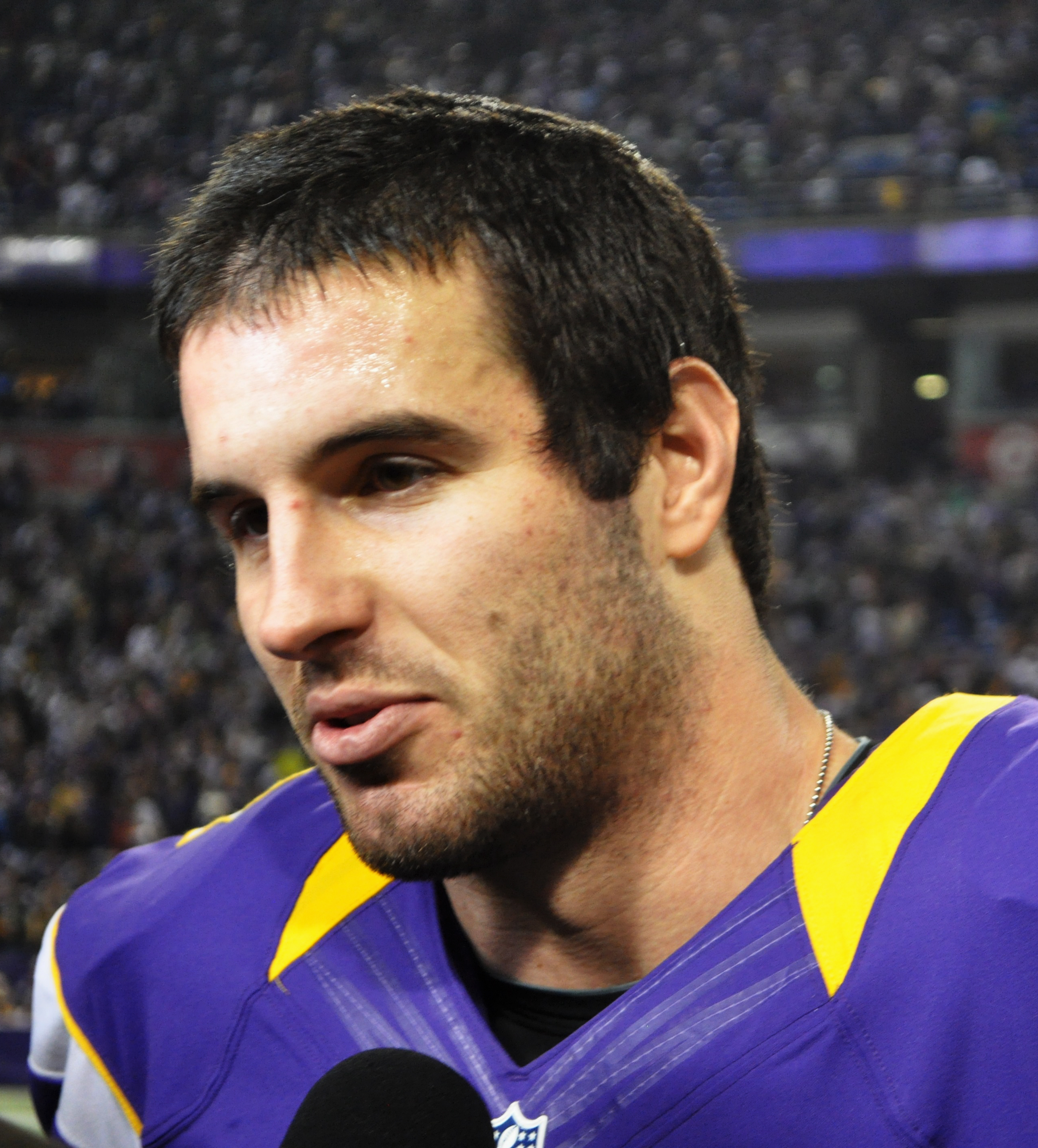
- Ponder with the Minnesota Vikings in 2012

No. 7, 2, 5
- Position: Quarterback

Personal information
- Born: February 25, 1988 (age 38); Dallas, Texas, U.S.
- Listed height: 6 ft 2 in (1.88 m)
- Listed weight: 230 lb (104 kg)

Career information
- High school: Colleyville Heritage (Colleyville, Texas)
- College: Florida State (2006–2010)
- NFL draft: 2011: 1st round, 12th overall pick

Career history
- Minnesota Vikings (2011–2014); Oakland Raiders (2015)*; Denver Broncos (2015); San Francisco 49ers (2016)
- * Offseason or practice squad member only

Career NFL statistics
- Passing attempts: 1,057
- Passing completions: 632
- Completion percentage: 59.8%
- TD–INT: 38–36
- Passing yards: 6,658
- Passer rating: 75.9
- Stats at Pro Football Reference

Christian Andrew Ponder (born February 25, 1988) is an American former professional football player who was a quarterback in the National Football League (NFL). He played college football for the Florida State Seminoles, and was selected by the Minnesota Vikings with the 12th overall pick in the 2011 NFL draft. He played for the Vikings, Denver Broncos and San Francisco 49ers.

Ponder had an up-and-down career with the Vikings. He started all 16 games and helped lead the team to a playoff berth in 2012, but also suffered several injuries and inconsistent play, eventually being benched in favor of rookie Teddy Bridgewater in 2014; he totaled a 14–21–1 record in his four seasons with the Vikings. He then spent time in a backup role for the Oakland Raiders, Denver Broncos and San Francisco 49ers, but never took another NFL snap before retiring in 2016.

Since December 2012, Ponder has been married to former ESPN personality Samantha Ponder.

== Early life ==
Ponder was born in Dallas, Texas, and grew up in Grapevine, Texas. His father, David Ponder, played college football at Florida State University as a defensive lineman from 1980 to 1983, and thus Christian Ponder is one of several father-son duos who played for Bobby Bowden, the Florida State Seminoles' head coach from 1976 through 2009. Christian Ponder attended Colleyville Heritage High School, where he played football. In 2004, he was the starting quarterback and threw for 1,500 yards and seven touchdowns. As a senior, he passed for 1,214 yards and 20 touchdowns and rushed for 911 yards and 12 touchdowns.

The Dallas Morning News named him to their all-district first team. Scout.com named him the 20th-ranked quarterback prospect, while Rivals.com rated him the 14th-ranked pro-style quarterback and the 50th-ranked college prospect from Texas. He received scholarship offers from Baylor, Florida State, Georgia Tech, Iowa State, North Carolina, and Texas Christian.

== College career ==
In 2006, Ponder sat out his true freshman season at Florida State on redshirt status. In 2007, he served as the back-up behind starting quarterback Drew Weatherford. Ponder saw action against Virginia Tech when Weatherford was taken out of the game due to an injury in the second quarter. Although Florida State lost, 40–21, Ponder completed eight out of 18 passing attempts for 105 yards and one touchdown.

Before the 2008 season, Ponder was named the starting quarterback ahead of senior Weatherford. The Miami Herald said that the decision showed the coaching staff put "a premium on mobility over maturity." Ponder started in all 13 games, and completed 177 passes on 318 attempts for 2,006 yards, 14 touchdowns, and 13 interceptions. He also made 119 rushing attempts for 423 yards and four touchdowns. The Seminoles finished the season with a 9–4 record, including a victory over Wisconsin in the Champs Sports Bowl. At season's end, Ponder was named the team's most valuable offensive player.

In 2009, Ponder was well on his way to a career season when he suffered a season ending shoulder injury at Clemson. Through the first eight games of the season, he led the ACC in passing average per game and was one of the national leaders in yards. He threw for over 2,700 yards and 14 touchdowns and considered jumping to the NFL a year early. However, after hitting Clemson safety DeAndre McDaniel on an interception return, Ponder separated his shoulder and missed the rest of the season. This ended his professional hopes, at least for one year. He resumed his role as the starting quarterback in 2010.

Before the 2010 season, Ponder was named to the Maxwell Award watch list. Florida State launched a campaign promoting Ponder as a Heisman Trophy candidate in July 2010. During the 2010 season, Ponder battled numerous setbacks to his health, including a swollen bursa sac in his throwing elbow. He re-injured the elbow numerous times during the season, and had to have it drained three times.

Ponder's 2010 season, his senior year and the only one he had under coach Jimbo Fisher, was his most successful. Ponder was the first Seminole quarterback since Chris Weinke in 1999 to lead his team to victories over both its in-state rivals, Miami and Florida. He also won the 2010 James Tatum award, given to the nation's top student-athlete, and a National Football Foundation Scholar-Athlete Award, as well as the Bobby Bowden Award, presented to the top student athlete among FBS schools. Ponder graduated from Florida State in two and a half years, with a degree in finance and a 3.73 GPA, then an MBA, and is studying for his second graduate degree, in sports management. At the 2011 Under Armour Senior Bowl, Ponder won MVP honors after throwing for 2 touchdowns and leading the South to a win over the heavily favored North.

== Professional career ==
Pre-draft measurables
Height	Weight	Arm length	Hand span	Wingspan	40-yard dash	10-yard split	20-yard split	20-yard shuttle	Three-cone drill	Vertical jump	Broad jump	Wonderlic
6 ft 2 in (1.88 m)	229 lb (104 kg)	32 1/8 in (0.82 m)	10 1/4 in (0.26 m)	6 ft 5 in (1.96 m)	4.72 s	1.64 s	2.76 s	4.09 s	6.85 s	34.0 in (0.86 m)	9 ft 8 in (2.95 m)	35
All values from 2011 NFL Scouting Combine

=== Minnesota Vikings ===
==== 2011 season ====
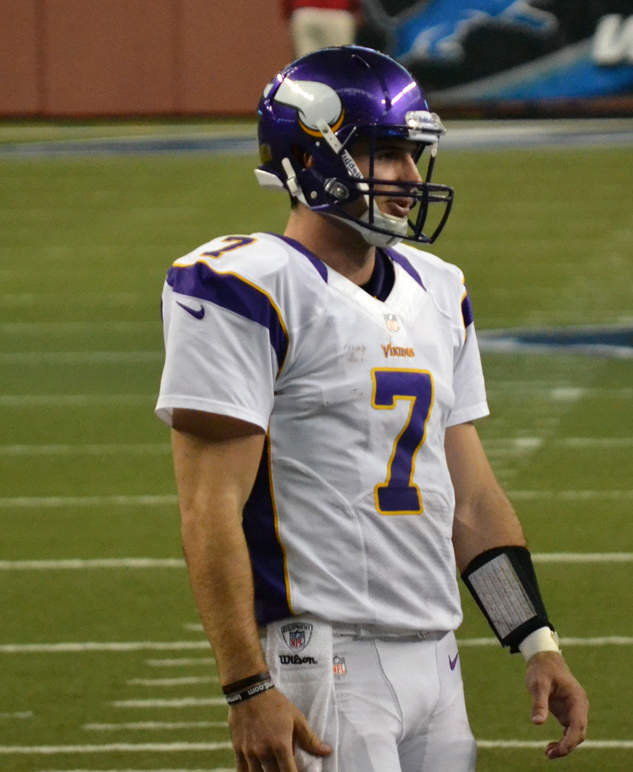
Ponder at Ford Field in Detroit in 2012

Ponder was selected 12th overall by the Minnesota Vikings in the first round of the 2011 NFL draft. He was the fourth quarterback selected in the draft, behind Cam Newton, Jake Locker, and Blaine Gabbert. Ponder did not have a typical rookie offseason following the draft due to the 2011 NFL lockout. Late in July, the Vikings traded for veteran quarterback Donovan McNabb to start and mentor Ponder. Three days after the McNabb trade, Ponder agreed to terms with the Vikings on a rookie contract that included $10 million guaranteed. Ponder embraced the competition from McNabb. "The guy deserves a starting job. He's been in the league for a while," Ponder said of McNabb. "My mentality is to be able to go in and compete and try to get that job from him. He deserves to be the starting quarterback. Somewhere down the road I'm going to push to take that over and we'll see." Ponder announced at his introduction press conference that he intended to wear jersey number 7 in the NFL.

Following a disastrous start to the season for the Vikings under McNabb, Ponder made his NFL debut against the Chicago Bears in the fourth quarter on October 16, 2011. In a game where the Vikings were blown out 39–10, Ponder completed 9-of-17 passes for 99 yards in his first real action. It was announced on Tuesday, October 18, that he would make his first start the following Sunday against the Green Bay Packers, replacing McNabb as the starter. On Ponder's first career pass attempt as a starter he hit Michael Jenkins on a 72-yard play-action pass. Two plays later, he threw his first career touchdown, completing a short pass to Visanthe Shiancoe. Ponder helped the 1–5 Vikings give the undefeated Packers a close game and finished 13-of-32 for 219 yards with two touchdowns and two interceptions in the 27–33 loss.

Ponder was able to get his first win as an NFL starting quarterback the following week against his fellow 2011 draft mate Cam Newton and the Carolina Panthers on October 30, 2011. He threw for 236 yards and a touchdown, and had a passer rating of 102.7 in the close 24–21 game. After a bye week, the Vikings faced off against the Packers again, this time on Monday Night Football at Lambeau Field. Ponder didn't perform as well as he did in the first game against Green Bay, and the Vikings were blown out 7–45.

Ponder finished out the next seven games with ups and downs. He threw two touchdowns with three interceptions against the Oakland Raiders in a losing effort. After a loss on the road to the Atlanta Falcons, the team played a home game against the Denver Broncos. Ponder threw three touchdowns and set a Vikings rookie record with 381 yards passing. But he also threw a crucial interception late in the fourth quarter to set up Tim Tebow and the Broncos for a game-winning drive. The next week, Ponder was injured in a game against Vikings' rival Detroit Lions at Ford Field, in which backup quarterback Joe Webb nearly brought Minnesota to a victory after Ponder threw two interceptions earlier in the game. After a home blowout loss to the NFC South champion New Orleans Saints, Ponder was injured in each of the final two regular season games, at the Washington Redskins and in the season finale against the Bears. Ponder finished the season throwing 13 touchdown passes and 13 interceptions, and compiling a 2–8 record as a starter, as the Vikings finished 3–13 for only the second time in franchise history.

==== 2012 season ====
During the 2012 offseason, many analysts including KC Joyner of ESPN believed that Ponder would have a breakout year in 2012. Joyner cited the Vikings' lack of talent around him as the reason why Ponder didn't reach his full potential in 2011.

The Vikings opened the 2012 season at home against the Jacksonville Jaguars. Trailing with just 14 seconds left in the game, Ponder completed a 26-yard pass to Devin Aromashodu, followed by a 6-yard pass to Kyle Rudolph. The two passes set up a game-tying Blair Walsh field goal to send the game to overtime, where the Vikings prevailed. After the game, Vikings head coach Leslie Frazier spoke positively about Ponder's end to regulation. "That's what this league is made of—quarterbacks who can take you down in the last two minutes of a game," Frazier said.

Following a close week two loss in Indianapolis, the Vikings returned home as an underdog playing the San Francisco 49ers. Ponder had arguably the best game of his career to that point, completing 21 of 35 passes for 198 yards, two touchdowns, and rushing for another touchdown on a 23-yard run. The Vikings won the game 24–13 and Ponder drew praise from NFL analysts. "He excels at buying time while keeping his eyes downfield until his weapons uncover. He has also done a fantastic job protecting the football, and has yet to throw an interception this season. There aren't a ton of playmaking quarterbacks who protect the football. Fortunately for the Vikings, they seem to have one," NFL Media Analyst Daniel Jeremiah said after the performance.

Through four games, the Vikings were 3–1, equaling their win total from the previous year. Ponder led the NFL in completion percentage during the month of September with 68% and was also the last quarterback in the NFL to turn the ball over. The Vikings were a surprise to many around the league with a 5–2 record. Ponder struggled over the next five games and the Vikings lost four of five. During that stretch, Ponder's completion percentage fell to just 56%, as he threw the same number of interceptions (5) as he did touchdowns over those five games. Vikings General Manager Rick Spielman stood behind Ponder during his rough patch of games. "I know everybody in this organization believes Christian Ponder is our guy," Spielman said, via Tom Pelissero of 1500ESPN.com. "And I have full, 100 percent belief that Christian Ponder's going to be our quarterback heading into the future."

In the fourth of those losses, Ponder struggled mightily at Lambeau Field in a game against the Packers on December 2. In a game where running back Adrian Peterson rushed for 210 yards, the Vikings weren't able to overcome two interceptions from Ponder on potential scoring drives. "I'm disappointed in myself. But I'm even more disappointed that I let down the veteran guys...I've had way too many turnovers since I stepped on the field in a Vikings uniform," Ponder said after the loss.

The Vikings stood at 6–6 and were still in the playoff picture. Minnesota first won a home game against Chicago on December 9 and then were victorious in St. Louis the following week, a game that included a Ponder rushing touchdown to give the Vikings an early lead. The next week, the Vikings traveled to Houston to play the 12–2 Texans. Going into the game as underdogs, the Vikings defense stifled the Texans' offense, holding them to just six points. Ponder led the Vikings offense to 23 points, including a touchdown throw to Kyle Rudolph. He also added 48 yards rushing on the ground, as the Vikings controlled the game. After the game, Ponder immediately turned to the final game of the regular season. "We obviously have a big one next week, and if we don't win that one, this one doesn't mean anything. Our No. 1 goal is to make the playoffs." Ponder said

In the regular season finale, the Vikings hosted the division champion Packers. If the Vikings won the game, they would earn a wildcard berth, but if they lost, division rival Chicago Bears would earn the final playoff spot. In addition to 197 rushing yards from Peterson, Ponder threw three touchdown passes and posted a career-high rating of 120.2. After jumping out to a 13–0 first-half lead, the Packers were able to make a comeback on the Vikings. With the game tied at 27 in the fourth quarter, Ponder completed a season-long 65-yard pass to Jarius Wright, which set up his third touchdown pass of the game. After taking criticism during his struggles through the year, Ponder joked to the media after the game that he didn't have the arm strength to make the throw, but did it anyway. On the game's final drive, with the score tied at 34, Ponder threw a 25-yard completion to Michael Jenkins on third down, which helped set up a game-winning field goal and stopped the Packers from getting the ball back. The win put the Vikings into the playoffs and also cost the Packers a first-round bye. Ponder's Total QBR was 12 points higher than Packers' quarterback Aaron Rodgers's for the game, according to ESPN's system. The game's result set up a rematch between the two teams the following week to open the playoffs.

However, Ponder was forced to miss the playoff game six days later, due to a deep triceps bruise he suffered during the first half of the previous game. Despite being able to finish the week 17 game, Ponder stated his arm wasn't capable of making the necessary throws. His backup, Joe Webb, who hadn't played a quarterback snap all season, took his place. The Vikings lost 24–10 in Lambeau Field.

The regular season was deemed a success for the Vikings. The team had their largest turnaround in team history going from three wins to 10. Adrian Peterson was named the league's MVP, rushing for 2,097 yards, just nine yards short of breaking the single-season rushing record. Ponder finished the season starting all 16 games, throwing 18 touchdowns to 12 interceptions, completed 62% of his passes, and had two rushing scores. According to ESPN's Total QBR system, Ponder finished the league as the 15th rated quarterback ahead of former Pro Bowlers Jay Cutler, Josh Freeman, and Matt Cassel.

==== 2013 season ====
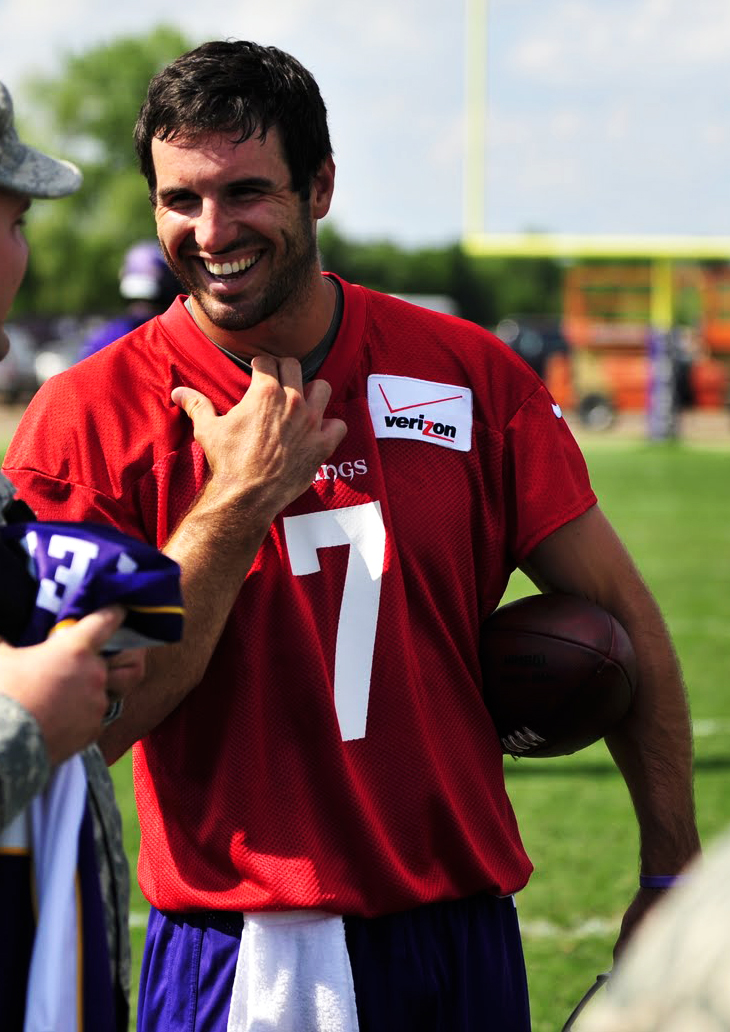
Ponder in 2013

Ponder went into the 2013 season as the starting quarterback. However, the Vikings started 0–3 and Ponder performed inconsistently in losses at Detroit, at Chicago, and home to Cleveland. Despite criticism from media and the fans, some defended Ponder. Following their week two game, Chicago Bears cornerback Charles Tillman spoke of how impressed he was by Ponder's play. "My respect level has gone up tremendously for Ponder," Tillman said. "He did some great things out there." During the home loss to Cleveland in week three, Ponder was booed by some Vikings fans as they also chanted for backup quarterback Matt Cassel. Following the game, Adrian Peterson stuck up for Ponder, calling the boos unfair. "I got his back. He scored two touchdowns and kept us in the game," Peterson said.

Ponder missed the week four game against Pittsburgh that was played in London due to a rib injury sustained during the Cleveland game, when team doctors did not let him play because they were concerned of the fractured rib being too close to his heart. Cassel led the Vikings to their first win of the season, but following the team's bye week struggled badly in a home loss to Carolina.

In the midst of Cassel taking over for the injured Ponder, the Vikings also signed Josh Freeman and thrust him into the starting role less than two weeks after being signed. On a Monday Night Football game, the Vikings scored zero points offensively in a loss to the Giants as Freeman performed worse than both Ponder and Cassel had to that point. Not only did Freeman perform poorly, but he also suffered a concussion, opening the door for Ponder to return to the starting lineup.

Ponder said he was going to play more loosely, adding that he had already been benched so he had nothing to lose, an attitude he carried forward as he started the next six games for the Vikings. Ponder showed improvements over the start of the season as he completed nearly 67% of his passes, threw five touchdowns, rushed for two touchdowns, and had a quarterback rating of 86.5. His final start of the season came on December 1, when Ponder was forced to leave the game against the Bears due to a concussion. Cassel finished the game, leading the Vikings to a win and started the final four games of the season. In total, the Vikings finished the season 5–10–1 and Ponder went 2–6–1 as a starter.

==== 2014 season ====
Following the disappointing 2013 season, Ponder's future with the Vikings fell in doubt. With the Vikings obtaining a new coaching staff and having drafted notable quarterback prospect Teddy Bridgewater in the 2014 NFL draft, Ponder was effectively rendered a third-string quarterback. Despite this, Ponder stated that he wished to stay with the Vikings, stating that he had learned a lot from new offensive coordinator Norv Turner. During the preseason Ponder was booed by the Vikings fans in a home preseason game, to which many in the organization, including new head coach Mike Zimmer and receiver Greg Jennings, stuck up for him. "You boo one of us, you boo all of us," Jennings was quoted as saying.

After being inactive for the first three games of the regular season as a third stringer, Ponder moved up the depth chart after Cassel was placed on Injured Reserve after a foot injury, while the rookie Bridgewater served as the starter for the remainder of the season.

On September 28, Ponder saw his first regular season action filling in for Bridgewater when he injured his ankle late in his first career start, which was a 41–28 win over the Atlanta Falcons. Ponder did little more than hand the ball off to rookie running back Jerick McKinnon as the Vikings preserved and added to their lead in the game. Fans in attendance who had previously booed Ponder, cheered his name like they had chanted "Teddy" earlier in the game.

Four days later, Ponder got his lone start of the season when Bridgewater was ruled out hours before the Thursday Night Football game against the Green Bay Packers. The game went downhill quickly for the Vikings and especially for Ponder, as he struggled on offense early and threw two interceptions in the second quarter that led to Packers' touchdowns en route to a 28–0 halftime deficit. Ponder picked up the pace somewhat after the half and spearheaded a pair of Vikings scoring drives, including running for the Vikings' lone touchdown in the 42–10 loss. Following the game, Ponder told the media the game was embarrassing and that it was difficult because he did not know when he would get another chance to play. With Bridgewater healthy, Ponder remained the backup for the rest of the season but did not appear in another game with the Vikings.

Because the Vikings chose not to extend a fifth-year option with Ponder, he became an unrestricted free agent at the end of the season. He accrued a 14–21–1 record as a starter for the Vikings, having started the majority of games for them from 2011 to 2013.

=== Oakland Raiders ===
On March 13, 2015, Ponder signed with the Oakland Raiders on a one-year contract that included a $1.5 million signing bonus. In Oakland, he was reunited with offensive coordinator Bill Musgrave, who coordinated the offense on the Vikings during Ponder's first three seasons with Minnesota. Ponder entered training camp playing with Oakland's second team offense behind starter Derek Carr but ahead of Matt McGloin.

During the preseason, Ponder returned to Minnesota in a game where he was booed by Vikings fans. Ponder finished the game 7 for 11 with 69 yards. Following the preseason, the Raiders released Ponder in favor of having McGloin be their backup to Carr for the season.

Following his release from Oakland, Ponder generated interest from the Philadelphia Eagles but was not signed. Ponder also had conversations about returning to Oakland after the first regular season game once Carr was injured, but once his injury was proven not serious, Oakland opted not to sign him. During the regular season, Ponder worked out for the Dallas Cowboys in September and the Tennessee Titans on November 3 but again went unsigned.

=== Denver Broncos ===
On November 25, 2015, Ponder signed with the Denver Broncos to be the third-string quarterback, while Peyton Manning nursed injuries. Ponder grew up a Broncos fan and quickly flew out to Denver the week of Thanksgiving to sign with them, once the Broncos called him. Ponder was inactive for games against New England and San Diego as he learned the playbook but was waived on December 8 before ever being active for a game.

A week after being waived by Denver, Ponder generated interest from the Cincinnati Bengals, but ultimately went unsigned as the season came to a conclusion. In total, Ponder spent the 2015 season on two different teams, worked out for two others and received interest from at least two more teams.

=== San Francisco 49ers ===
On August 16, 2016, Ponder signed with the San Francisco 49ers on a one-year deal following a season-ending injury to Thad Lewis and the unknown health status of Colin Kaepernick. The contract was worth $800,000 and included no signing bonus or guarantees. Ponder had previously worked out for the Cardinals just days before the 49ers called him. After signing with the 49ers, Ponder's wife revealed on her Instagram account that Ponder had previously turned down other NFL jobs for the sake of his family.

On October 7, 2016, it was reported that after bad play by starting quarterback Blaine Gabbert, several teammates believed Ponder should start. Ponder was active as the backup quarterback for the final three games of the season, as backup to Colin Kaepernick, who took over for Gabbert. Ponder did not make an appearance in any of the games. Head Coach Chip Kelly said Ponder's performance in practice led to him being in uniform.

Throughout the season, there was speculation that teammates and some members of the front office wanted Ponder to play. Ponder's contract was not renewed following the firing of General Manager Trent Baalke.

Ponder attempted a comeback to play in the NFL under the tutelage of QB guru Brian Gottlieb, but he did not sign to another team after San Francisco.

== Career statistics ==
=== NFL ===
Year	Team	Games		Passing								Rushing				Sacked		Fumbles	
Year	Team	GP	GS	Cmp	Att	Pct	Yds	Avg	TD	Int	Rtg	Att	Yds	Avg	TD	Sck	SckY	Fum	Lost
2011	MIN	11	10	158	291	54.3	1,853	6.4	13	13	70.1	28	219	7.8	0	30	164	6	2
2012	MIN	16	16	300	483	62.1	2,935	6.1	18	12	81.2	60	253	4.2	2	32	184	7	5
2013	MIN	9	9	152	239	63.6	1,648	6.9	7	9	77.9	34	151	4.4	4	27	119	7	4
2014	MIN	2	1	22	44	50	222	5.0	0	2	45.8	4	16	4	1	6	34	0	0
2015	DEN	0	0	DNP															
2016	SF	0	0	DNP															
Total		38	36	632	1,057	59.8	6,658	6.1	38	36	75.9	126	639	5.1	7	95	501	20	11

=== College ===
Season	Team	Cmp	Att	Pct	Yds	TD	Int
2007	Florida State	8	18	44.4	105	1	2
2008	Florida State	177	318	55.7	2,006	14	13
2009	Florida State	227	330	68.8	2,717	14	7
2010	Florida State	184	299	61.5	2,044	20	8
College totals		596	965	61.8	6,872	49	30

=== Minnesota Vikings franchise records ===
- Most passing yards in a game by a rookie: 381 (December 4, 2011)

== Personal life ==
Ponder married ESPN reporter Samantha Steele on December 17, 2012. The couple first started seeing each other after Ponder messaged her on Twitter. After two months, the couple decided to get married, driving to a Hudson, Wisconsin courthouse before having their wedding meal at Arby's. The two held a formal ceremony the following April.

Their first child, a daughter named Bowden Saint-Claire Ponder, was born in 2014. Bowden Ponder was named after Christian's college football coach at Florida State, Bobby Bowden, and also goes by the name "Scout", derived from Samantha's favorite novel To Kill a Mockingbird.

In 2017, Samantha revealed on Twitter that the couple's first son was born. They named him Robinson True, and said that "he was named after Jackie and David (Robinson)... two men of courage who weren't/aren't afraid to hold to their convictions and take the road less traveled." In 2018, the Ponders announced the birth of their third child, a daughter.

Ponder and his wife live in Arizona and New York City.
