= Wyatt Sexton =

American football player (born 1984)

Wyatt Sexton (born July 20, 1984) is a former National Collegiate Athletic Association (NCAA) American football quarterback for the Florida State Seminoles. Sexton is well known for his performances on the field and for his suffering from the effects of Lyme disease. Sexton's career ended after he was doused with pepper spray by police officers who found him lying in the street and proclaiming himself as God in June 2005. Although Sexton was already suspended from the team at the time due to erratic behavior stemming from the disease, including failing to take a drug test, and unusual behavior in practice. The aforementioned incident prompted his indefinite suspension and a prolonged battery of medical tests which ultimately revealed the disease.

== Biography ==
=== Early life ===
As a child Sexton grew up in a football household as his father Billy was a longtime assistant football coach at Florida State. Sexton attended Leon High School in the Tallahassee area where he starred at quarterback. Sexton threw for over 3,122 yards and 28 touchdowns as a junior to lead the state in passing, and then threw for 2,193 yards and 24 touchdowns as a senior. Sexton graduated from Leon with a 4.0 GPA and scored a 1300 on his SAT.

=== FSU and football ===
Sexton arrived on campus as a prized recruit during the summer of 2002. He was ranked as one of the top quarterback prospects in Florida coming out of high school. Being the son of an assistant coach, his transition to Florida State was expected to be smooth. After redshirting his freshman year in 2002, he played sparingly as a redshirt freshman in 2003. As a redshirt sophomore in 2004 Sexton took over the offense for long stretches for the ineffective Chris Rix and started seven games with a record of 5-2 as a starter, throwing for 1,661 yards and eight touchdowns in the process. Sexton headed into his junior season as the projected starting quarterback, and was named "most dependable quarterback" following the spring practices in 2005. Through his first two years at the school Sexton was a standout student who received awards for his academic performance.

=== Battle with Lyme disease ===
This would all change in the middle of 2005 however. In June 2005 Wyatt attended Bonnaroo. Shortly after he returned home police responded to a call about a man doing pushups in the street and jumping on cars in a residential neighborhood near Tallahassee, Florida. When they reached the scene, Tallahassee police officer Zachary Lyne stated that Sexton was sitting in the middle of the street wearing only a pair of wet shorts and when repeatedly asked to state his name he eventually responded only that he was God. Lyne then stated that Sexton became belligerent and had to be pepper sprayed and subdued. Sexton was not charged with a crime as he passed a sobriety test, and police stated that he had not committed a criminal act. The police then, after consulting with Sexton's parents, released him to a hospital for medical observation. Initially there were allegations of drug abuse which Sexton's family quickly repudiated. Sexton was later diagnosed with Lyme disease, a tick-borne disease that can cause joint swelling and brain inflammation if left untreated. The disease was deemed to be in its later stages by a Lyme disease specialist when it was diagnosed, who then recommended a treatment program of intensive antibiotic therapy for several months.

In January 2006 Sexton announced he was quitting the football team in order to concentrate on his health and academics at Florida State.
