= Drew Weatherford =

American football player (born 1985)

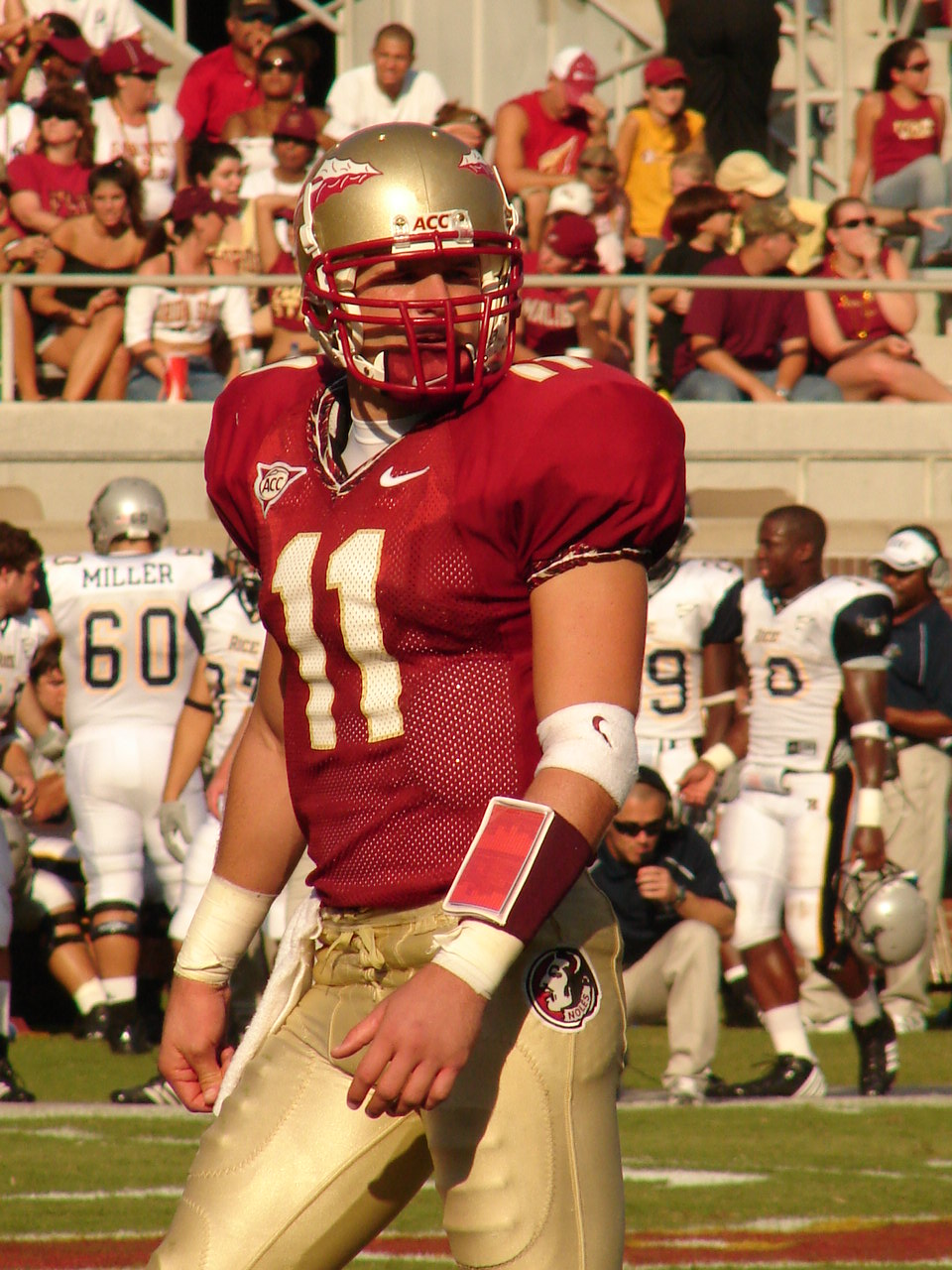
- Weatherford with Florida State in 2006

No. 11
- Position: Quarterback

Personal information
- Born: June 22, 1985 (age 41); Odessa, Florida, U.S.
- Listed height: 6 ft 3 in (1.91 m)
- Listed weight: 218 lb (99 kg)

Career information
- High school: Land O' Lakes (Land O' Lakes, Florida)
- College: Florida State (2005–2008)
- NFL draft: 2009: undrafted

Career history
- Tampa Bay Storm (2010)
- Stats at ArenaFan.com

Andrew Skillern Weatherford (born June 22, 1985) is an American former football quarterback. He played college football at Florida State University from 2004 to 2008.

== Early life ==
Weatherford attended Land O' Lakes High School in Pasco County, Florida. He led the Fighting Gators to a 32–14 (4–4 in the state playoffs) record in four years as the starting quarterback. Weatherford set both school and county records for season and career passing yards as well as touchdown passes. In his freshman season, Weatherford had the opportunity to play football with his older brother, Sam. The tandem played to a 7–3 regular-season record and traveled to Southlake High School for the playoffs. Andrew threw a touchdown to his tight end sibling in a losing effort.

In the 2002 season, Weatherford had his most prolific stats, leading the state in passing touchdowns (ahead of future FSU backup Xavier Lee). His Gators won the second playoff game in school history against Ocala Vanguard. Weatherford did not throw an interception through eight games. This was the season he would set Pasco's single-season passing yardage record. Land O' Lakes would set school scoring records for points in a game (60) as well as points for a season (423). Weatherford guided his team to a perfect regular season, and two playoff wins. His season ended when they lost to eventual state champion Palm Bay High School, which featured future NFL players Reggie Nelson and Joe Cohen. The Palm Bay game was by far Weatherford's most struggling performance being sacked and intercepted four times (making the season total six). He finished the season with a 12–1 record.

Coached by John Benedetto, Weatherford started every game of his high school career behind center. In his senior year he also started on defense as the team's safety. After a superb junior year, the Gators started the year with a state ranking of No. 5. They quickly fell from the state's elite when they lost the first two games of the season. While Weatherford put up modest numbers himself, the lack of another standout player and the loss of focus on the running game, the team finished 6–4. Weatherford and his team would gain composure in the playoffs defeating Auburndale and Ocala Forest. Drew Weatherford played his final game in a shootout with Lakeland Lake Gibson High School, losing to the Braves (who were led by USF's eventual star quarterback Matt Grothe), 44–35.

== College career ==
=== 2005 ===
After the career of Wyatt Sexton was cut short by Lyme disease, Weatherford won the starting job over fellow redshirt freshman Xavier Lee during fall practice.

Weatherford, as a redshirt freshman, led the Seminoles to an Orange Bowl berth in 2005, but his #22 Seminoles lost to #3 Penn State in triple overtime. After that game, he underwent surgery for a torn tendon in his right ankle and healed fully.

=== 2006 ===
In the Spring of 2006, he won FSU camp awards for Most Dependable Quarterback and Top Offensive Leadership. Weatherford missed the Maryland game on October 28, 2006, due to injury, which gave Xavier Lee his shot at the starting job, escalating the quarterback controversy which had been hotly debated all season. Eventually Weatherford won the starting position over Lee.

=== 2007 ===
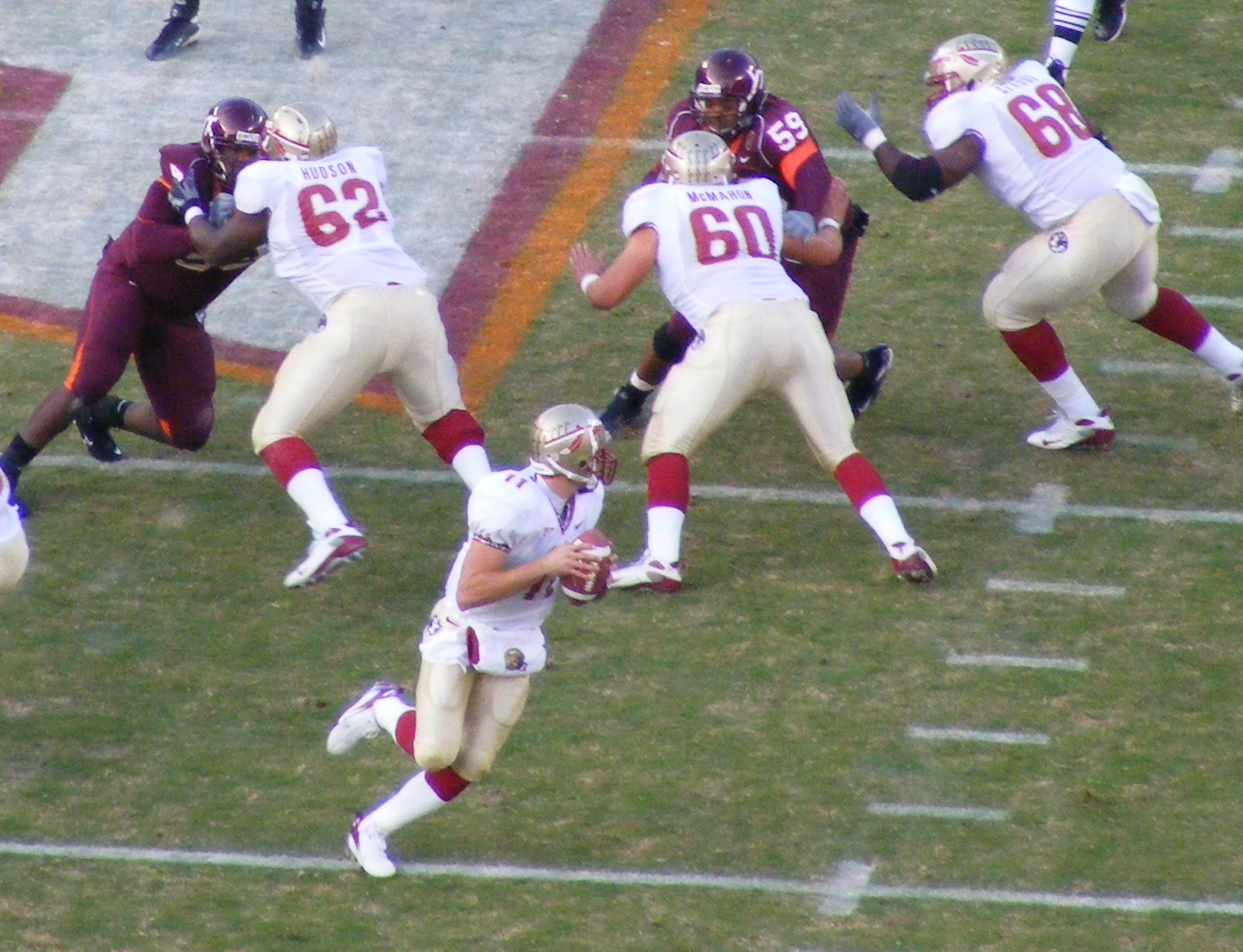
Weatherford rolls out to pass against the Virginia Tech Hokies

Following FSU's Emerald Bowl victory against UCLA, a heated quarterback competition between Lee and Weatherford came to a resolution on August 23, 2007, when Weatherford was named the starter for the opener against Clemson.

=== 2008 ===
Weatherford sat out of spring practice after a slight tear in the lateral meniscus in his right knee required surgery. He was expected to be the starter headed into fall camp, but he faced fierce competition from redshirt sophomores D'Vontrey Richardson and Christian Ponder.

On August 3, after two and half scrimmages, Jimbo Fisher, Florida State's quarterbacks coach and offensive coordinator, announced that Christian Ponder would start the Seminoles' game against Western Carolina on September 6. Weatherford was moved down to third string on the depth chart and played in only one series late in the fourth quarter during FSU's 69–0 blowout of Western Carolina.

He also split snaps with Richardson during FSU's 45–15 loss to the Florida Gators, as Ponder left the game at halftime after aggravating a back injury inflicted during FSU's 37–3 rout of Maryland.

== Professional career ==
=== 2009 ===
Weatherford was invited to participate in the Chicago Bears three-day mini camp. He also worked out with the New Orleans Saints and the New England Patriots.

Weatherford participated in an open tryout on August 22 for the Orlando Tuskers of the newly formed United Football League. Following this tryout, Weatherford was film-interviewed by reporter Donnie Paschal.

=== 2010 ===
In 2010, Weatherford played in the Arena Football League with the Tampa Bay Storm. He was the backup behind starting QB Brett Dietz, and was on kickoff coverage.

== Post-football career ==
Weatherford founded private equity firm Weatherford Capital with his brothers, Sam Weatherford and Will Weatherford, the former Speaker of the Florida House of Representatives. He also sits on the FSU Board of Trustees.
