= Xavier Lee =

American football player (born 1986)

No. 19, 82
- Position: Quarterback/Wide receiver

Personal information
- Born: January 9, 1986 (age 40); Daytona Beach, Florida, U.S.
- Listed height: 6 ft 4 in (1.93 m)
- Listed weight: 254 lb (115 kg)

Career information
- High school: Seabreeze (Daytona Beach)
- College: Florida State (2004–2007)
- NFL draft: 2008: undrafted

Career history
- Baltimore Ravens (2008)*; Southern New Hampshire Beavers (2008); Arkansas Twisters (2008–2009); Oklahoma City Yard Dawgz (2010); Arizona Rattlers (2011)*; Pittsburgh Power (2011); Kansas City Command (2011); Las Vegas Locomotives (2012); Orlando Predators (2013)*; Kansas City Renegades (2013); San Antonio Talons (2013); Orlando Predators (2014)*; Nebraska Danger (2015)*
- * Offseason or practice squad member only

Career AFL statistics
- Receptions: 104
- Receiving yards: 1,140
- Receiving touchdowns: 13
- Passing yards: 910
- TD–INT: 13–6
- Stats at ArenaFan.com

Xavier Tyree Lee (born January 9, 1986) is an American former professional football player who was a quarterback and wide receiver in the Arena Football League (AFL). He played college football for the Florida State Seminoles and was signed by the Baltimore Ravens of the National Football League (NFL) as an undrafted free agent in 2008.

== Early life ==
Lee attended Seabreeze High School in Daytona Beach, Florida. He set Florida's all-time record for passing yards (9,082), completions (549) and touchdowns (98) in football. Lee was named Florida's Mr. Football in 2002, and won state 3A Player of the Year honors as a senior. During his senior season, he rushed for 461 yards and 13 touchdowns and was 188-for-304 (62 percent), passing for 3,075 yards with 33 touchdowns and 10 interceptions. He was rated a five-star player and the No. 1 dual threat quarterback in the nation by Rivals.com. Lee played in the 2004 U.S. Army All-American Bowl. Highly recruited, he signed with Florida State passing up offers by Ohio State, Tennessee, Texas, Auburn, and Florida.

== College career ==
As a redshirt sophomore in 2006, Lee played in eight games, including three starts, and passed for 885 yards with 7 touchdowns and 5 interceptions. Lee started for the injured Drew Weatherford on October 28, 2006, on the road at Maryland. He also started and won his first game on Saturday, November 4 at home against Virginia. On August 23, 2007, the eight-month quarterback competition ended when offensive coordinator Jimbo Fisher named Weatherford the starting quarterback for the Seminole's opener at Clemson.

On September 29, 2007, Lee replaced Weatherford in the second quarter against Alabama and led the Seminoles to a 21–14 victory. Lee finished the game 12–19 with 224 yards, two touchdowns, one interception, and 11 rushes for 59 yards. His performance earned him the starting quarterback job and Atlantic Coast Conference co-Offensive Back honors for the week of October 1. Lee subsequently gave the starter's job back to Drew Weatherford due to poor performance.

== Professional career ==
=== Baltimore Ravens ===
Lee decided to forgo his senior season at Florida State, and declared himself eligible for the 2008 NFL draft. He was not invited to the NFL Combine, and therefore could only showcase his talent at Florida State's Pro Day, where he was measured in at 6'4", weighed 232 pounds, and was clocked at times of 4.54, 4.64, and 4.76 seconds in the 40-yard dash. Despite his workouts and Pro Day results, he was not selected in the 2008 NFL Draft. On May 16, 2008, the Baltimore Ravens signed Lee as an undrafted free agent. The Ravens signed him as a tight end instead of quarterback. He was released by the Ravens on June 26, 2008.

=== Arkansas Twisters ===
Following a brief stint as a wide receiver for the Southern New Hampshire Beavers of the New England Football League, Lee was invited to the preseason camp of the Arkansas Twisters of the af2 as a quarterback but was later converted to wide receiver.

=== Oklahoma City Yard Dawgz ===
He was a wide receiver and back-up quarterback for the Oklahoma City Yard Dawgz of the Arena Football League (AFL).

=== Las Vegas Locomotives ===
He played tight end for the Las Vegas Locomotives of the United Football League (UFL) in 2012.

=== Kansas City Renegades ===
Lee was signed in April 2013 by the Kansas City Renegades and guided them to their 2nd victory ever as a franchise in the inaugural season of the Champions Professional Indoor Football League (CPIFL), completing 10 of 17 passes with 2 touchdowns and 2 interceptions.

=== San Antonio Talons ===
Lee was assigned to the San Antonio Talons midway through the 2013 season. Originally signed as a wide receiver, Lee played a few games at quarterback when the Talons were hit with a spate of injuries.
