= List of Georgia Tech Yellow Jackets football seasons =

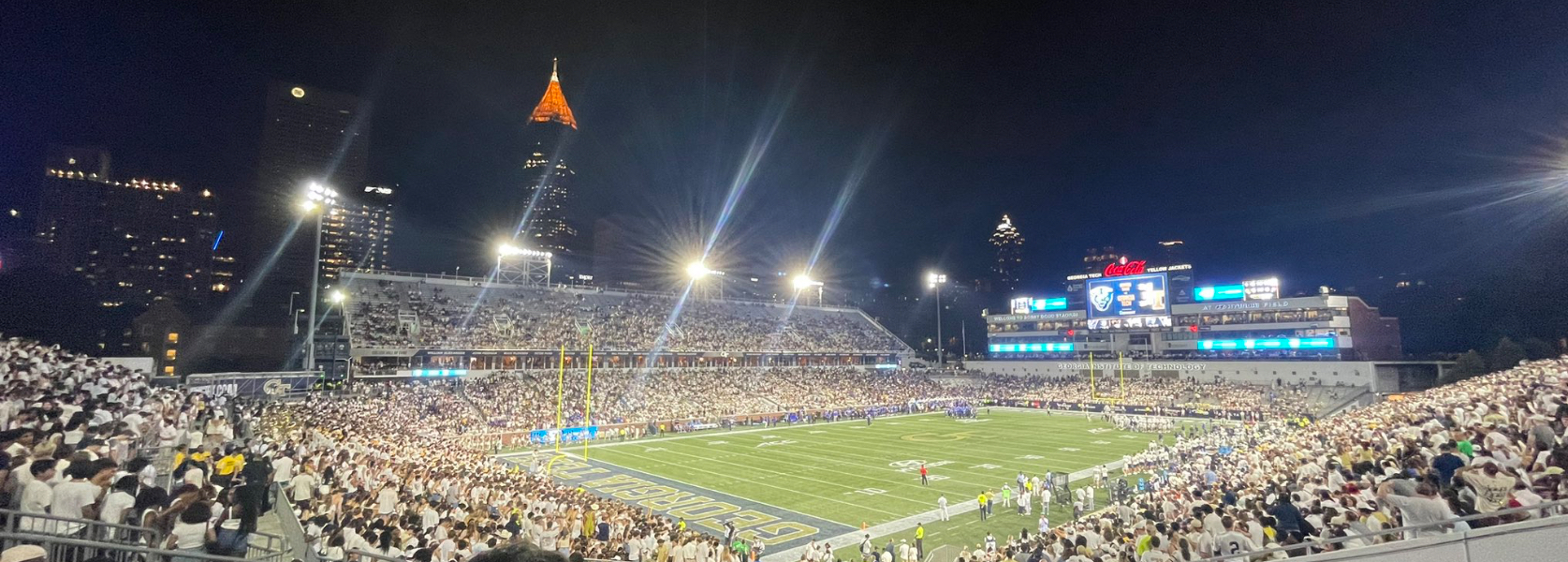
Bobby Dodd Stadium, where the Yellow Jackets have played since 1913.

This is a list of seasons completed by the Georgia Tech Yellow Jackets football team of the National Collegiate Athletic Association (NCAA) Division I Football Bowl Subdivision (FBS). Since the team's creation in 1892, the Yellow Jackets have participated in more than 1,300 officially sanctioned games, including 46 bowl games.

The Yellow Jackets have been a member of numerous athletic conferences. In 1894, Tech was a founding member of the now defunct Southern Intercollegiate Athletic Association, where it won a national championship in 1917. In 1922, the Yellow Jackets joined the Southern Conference as a founding member, where it won a national championship in 1928. In 1933, Tech joined the Southeastern Conference as a founding member, where it won a national championship in 1952. From 1964 to 1978, the Yellow Jackets competed as an independent. In 1979, Georgia Tech joined the Atlantic Coast Conference, where it has been a member ever since.

== Seasons ==
Year	Coach	Overall	Conference	Standing	Bowl/playoffs	Coaches^{#}	AP^{°}
Ernest E. West (Independent) (1892)
1892	Georgia Tech	0–3					
Leonard Wood & Frank O. Spain (Independent) (1893–1894)
1893	Georgia Tech	2–1–1					
1894	Georgia Tech	0–3					
1895	No team						
No coach (Independent) (1896–1898)
1896	Georgia Tech	2–1–1					
1897	Georgia Tech	0–1–0					
1898	Georgia Tech	0–3	0–3	10th			
Rufus B. Nalley (Southern Intercollegiate Athletic Association) (1899)
1899	Georgia Tech	0–6–1	0–5	T–15th			
Harris T. Collier (Southern Intercollegiate Athletic Association) (1900)
1900	Georgia Tech	0–4	0–4	T–13th			
John McKee (Independent) (1901)
1901	Georgia Tech	4–0–1					
George Andree (Southern Intercollegiate Athletic Association) (1902)
1902	Georgia Tech	0–6–2	0–4–2	18th			
Oliver Huie (Southern Intercollegiate Athletic Association) (1903)
1903	Georgia Tech	3–5	1–4	13th			
John Heisman (Southern Intercollegiate Athletic Association) (1904–1913)
1904	Georgia Tech	8–1–1	2–1–1	6th			
1905	Georgia Tech	6–0–1	4–0–1	2nd			
1906	Georgia Tech	5–3–1	3–3	8th			
1907	Georgia Tech	4–4	2–4	10th			
1908	Georgia Tech	6–3	5–3	6th			
1909	Georgia Tech	7–2	5–2	5th			
1910	Georgia Tech	5–3	3–3	11th			
1911	Georgia Tech	6–2–1	5–2–1	5th			
1912	Georgia Tech	5–3–1	5–3	5th			
1913	Georgia Tech	7–2	5–2	4th			
John Heisman (Independent) (1914–1915)
1914	Georgia Tech	6–2					
1915	Georgia Tech	7–0–1		T–1st			
John Heisman (Southern Intercollegiate Athletic Association) (1916–1919)
1916	Georgia Tech	8–0–1	4–0–1	T–1st			
1917	Georgia Tech	9–0	4–0	1st			
1918	Georgia Tech	6–1	3–0	1st			
1919	Georgia Tech	7–3	3–1	4th			
William Alexander (Southern Intercollegiate Athletic Association) (1920–1921)
1920	Georgia Tech	8–1	5–0	T–1st			
1921	Georgia Tech	8–1	5–0	T–1st			
William Alexander (Southern Conference) (1922–1932)
1922	Georgia Tech	7–2	4–0	T–1st			
1923	Georgia Tech	3–2–4	0–0–4	T–11th			
1924	Georgia Tech	5–3–1	3–2–1	10th			
1925	Georgia Tech	6–2–1	4–1–1	T–5th			
1926	Georgia Tech	4–5	4–3	9th			
1927	Georgia Tech	8–1–1	7–0–1	T–1st			
1928	Georgia Tech	10–0	7–0	1st	W Rose		
1929	Georgia Tech	3–6	3–5	14th			
1930	Georgia Tech	2–6–1	2–4–1	15th			
1931	Georgia Tech	2–7–1	2–4–1	16th			
1932	Georgia Tech	4–5–1	4–4–1	T–10th			
William Alexander (Southeastern Conference) (1933–1944)
1933	Georgia Tech	5–5	2–5	10th			
1934	Georgia Tech	1–9	0–6	12th			
1935	Georgia Tech	5–5	3–4	8th			
1936	Georgia Tech	5–5–1	3–3–1	T–6th			
1937	Georgia Tech	6–3–1	3–2–1	6th			
1938	Georgia Tech	3–4–3	2–1–3	5th			
1939	Georgia Tech	8–2	6–0	T–1st	W Orange		16
1940	Georgia Tech	3–7	1–5	11th			
1941	Georgia Tech	3–6	2–4	9th			
1942	Georgia Tech	9–2	4–1	T–2nd	L Cotton		5
1943	Georgia Tech	8–3	3–0	1st	W Sugar		13
1944	Georgia Tech	8–3	4–0	1st	L Orange		13
Bobby Dodd (Southeastern Conference) (1945–1963)
1945	Georgia Tech	4–6	2–2	T–5th			
1946	Georgia Tech	9–2	4–2	4th	W Oil		11
1947	Georgia Tech	10–1	4–1	2nd	W Orange		10
1948	Georgia Tech	7–3	4–3	5th			
1949	Georgia Tech	7–3	5–2	4th			
1950	Georgia Tech	5–6	4–2	5th			
1951	Georgia Tech	11–0–1	7–0	T–1st	W Orange	5	5
1952	Georgia Tech	12–0	7–0	1st	W Sugar	2	2
1953	Georgia Tech	9–2–1	4–1–1	T–2nd	W Sugar	9	8
1954	Georgia Tech	8–3	6–2	2nd	W Cotton	11	
1955	Georgia Tech	9–1–1	4–1–1	2nd	W Sugar	7	7
1956	Georgia Tech	10–1	7–1	2nd	W Gator	4	4
1957	Georgia Tech	4–4–2	3–4–1	8th			
1958	Georgia Tech	5–4–1	2–3–1	8th			
1959	Georgia Tech	6–5	3–3	7th	L Gator		
1960	Georgia Tech	5–5	4–4	7th			
1961	Georgia Tech	7–4	4–3	T–4th	L Gator	13	13
1962	Georgia Tech	7–3–1	5–2	4th	L Bluebonnet	11	
1963	Georgia Tech	7–3	4–3	6th			
Bobby Dodd (Independent) (1964–1966)
1964	Georgia Tech	7–3					
1965	Georgia Tech	7–3–1			W Gator		
1966	Georgia Tech	9–2			L Orange	8	8
Bud Carson (Independent) (1967–1971)
1967	Georgia Tech	4–6					
1968	Georgia Tech	4–6					
1969	Georgia Tech	4–6					
1970	Georgia Tech	9–3			W Sun	17	13
1971	Georgia Tech	6–6			L Peach		
Bill Fulcher (Independent) (1972–1973)
1972	Georgia Tech	7–4–1			W Liberty		20
1973	Georgia Tech	5–6					
Pepper Rodgers (Independent) (1974–1979)
1974	Georgia Tech	6–5					
1975	Georgia Tech	7–4					
1976	Georgia Tech	4–6–1					
1977	Georgia Tech	6–5					
1978	Georgia Tech	7–5			L Peach		
1979	Georgia Tech	4–6–1					
Bill Curry (Independent) (1980–1982)
1980	Georgia Tech	1–9–1					
1981	Georgia Tech	1–10					
1982	Georgia Tech	6–5					
Bill Curry (Atlantic Coast Conference) (1983–1986)
1983	Georgia Tech	3–8	3–2	3rd			
1984	Georgia Tech	6–4–1	2–2–1	5th			
1985	Georgia Tech	9–2–1	5–1	2nd	W All-American	18	19
1986	Georgia Tech	5–5–1	3–3	4th			
Bobby Ross (Atlantic Coast Conference) (1987–1991)
1987	Georgia Tech	2–9	0–6	8th			
1988	Georgia Tech	3–8	0–7	8th			
1989	Georgia Tech	7–4	4–3	T–4th			
1990	Georgia Tech	11–0–1	6–0–1	1st	W Florida Citrus	1	2
1991	Georgia Tech	8–5	5–2	2nd	W Aloha		
Bill Lewis (Atlantic Coast Conference) (1992–1994)
1992	Georgia Tech	5–6	4–4	T–4th			
1993	Georgia Tech	5–6	3–5	6th			
1994	Georgia Tech	1–7	0–6				
George O'Leary (Atlantic Coast Conference) (1994–2001)
1994	Georgia Tech	0-3	0–2	9th			
1995	Georgia Tech	6–5	5–3	4th			
1996	Georgia Tech	5–6	4–4	5th			
1997	Georgia Tech	7–5	5–3	T–3rd	W Carquest		25
1998	Georgia Tech	10–2	7–1	T–1st	W Gator	11	9
1999	Georgia Tech	8–4	5–3	T–2nd	L Gator	21	20
2000	Georgia Tech	9–3	6–2	T–2nd	L Peach	19	17
2001	Georgia Tech	7-5	4–4	T–4th			24
Mac McWhorter (Interim) (Atlantic Coast Conference) (2001)
2001	Georgia Tech	1-0	0-0		W Seattle		
Chan Gailey (Atlantic Coast Conference) (2002–2007)
2002	Georgia Tech	7–6	4–4	T–5th	L Silicon Valley		
2003	Georgia Tech	7–6	4–4	T–4th	W Humanitarian		
2004	Georgia Tech	7–5	4–4	T–6th	W Champs Sports		
2005	Georgia Tech	7–5	5–3	3rd (Coastal)	L Emerald		
2006	Georgia Tech	9–5	7–1	1st (Coastal)	L Gator		
2007	Georgia Tech	7–5	4–4	3rd (Coastal)			
Jon Tenuta (Interim) (Atlantic Coast Conference) (2007)
2007	Georgia Tech	0-1	0-0		L Humanitarian		
Paul Johnson (Atlantic Coast Conference) (2008–2018)
2008	Georgia Tech	9–4	5–3	T–1st (Coastal)	L Chick-Fil-A	22	22
2009	Georgia Tech	11–3	7–1	1st (Coastal)	L Orange^{†}	13	13
2010	Georgia Tech	6–7	4–4	T–3rd (Coastal)	L Independence		
2011	Georgia Tech	8–5	5–3	T–2nd (Coastal)	L Sun		
2012	Georgia Tech	7–7	5–3	T–1st (Coastal)	W Sun		
2013	Georgia Tech	7–6	5–3	T–2nd (Coastal)	L Music City		
2014	Georgia Tech	11–3	6–2	1st (Coastal)	W Orange^{†}	7	8
2015	Georgia Tech	3–9	1–7	7th (Coastal)			
2016	Georgia Tech	9–4	4–4	5th (Coastal)	W TaxSlayer		
2017	Georgia Tech	5–6	4–4	3rd (Coastal)			
2018	Georgia Tech	7–6	5–3	2nd (Coastal)	L Quick Lane		
Geoff Collins (Atlantic Coast Conference) (2019–2022)
2019	Georgia Tech	3–9	2–6	7th (Coastal)			
2020	Georgia Tech	3–7	3–6	12th			
2021	Georgia Tech	3–9	2–6	6th (Coastal)			
2022	Georgia Tech	1–3	0–1				
Brent Key (Atlantic Coast Conference) (2022–present)
2022	Georgia Tech	4–4	4–3	4th (Coastal)			
2023	Georgia Tech	7–6	5–3	T–4th	W Gasparilla		
2024	Georgia Tech	7–6	5–3	T–5th	L Birmingham		
2025	Georgia Tech	9–4	6–2	T–2nd	L Pop-Tarts	24	
Total:		763–546–43					
National championship Conference title Conference division title or championship game berth
^{#}Rankings from final Coaches Poll.
