= Calvin Johnson =

American football player (born 1985)

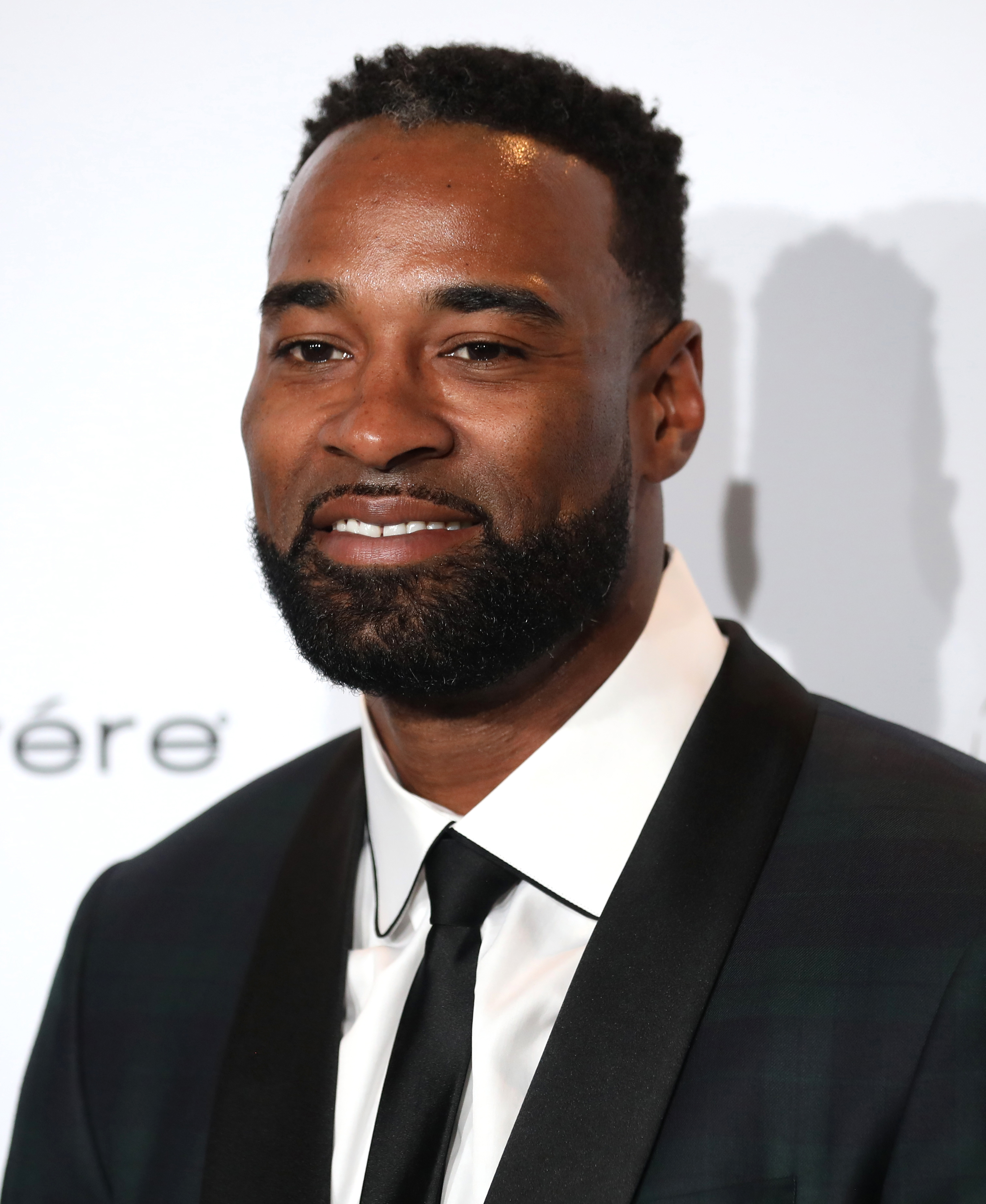
- Johnson in 2024

No. 81
- Position: Wide receiver

Personal information
- Born: September 29, 1985 (age 41); Tyrone, Georgia, U.S.
- Listed height: 6 ft 5 in (1.96 m)
- Listed weight: 237 lb (108 kg)

Career information
- High school: Sandy Creek (Tyrone)
- College: Georgia Tech (2004–2006)
- NFL draft: 2007: 1st round, 2nd overall pick

Career history
- Detroit Lions (2007–2015)

Awards and highlights
- 3× First-team All-Pro (2011–2013); Second-team All-Pro (2010); 6× Pro Bowl (2010–2015); 2× NFL receiving yards leader (2011, 2012); NFL receptions leader (2012); NFL receiving touchdowns co-leader (2008); NFL 2010s All-Decade Team; PFWA All-Rookie Team (2007); Detroit Lions All-Time Team; Pride of the Lions; Fred Biletnikoff Award (2006); Paul Warfield Trophy (2006); Unanimous All-American (2006); First-team All-American (2005); ACC Player of the Year (2006); ACC Rookie of the Year (2004); 3× First-team All-ACC (2004–2006); NFL records: Most receiving yards in a season: 1,964; Most consecutive 100-yard receiving games: 8

Career NFL statistics
- Receptions: 731
- Receiving yards: 11,619
- Receiving touchdowns: 83
- Stats at Pro Football Reference
- Pro Football Hall of Fame
- College Football Hall of Fame

Calvin Johnson Jr. (born September 29, 1985) is an American former professional football player who was a wide receiver in the National Football League (NFL) for nine seasons with the Detroit Lions. Nicknamed "Megatron" after the Transformers character of the same name, he is regarded as one of the greatest wide receivers of all time. Johnson played college football for the Georgia Tech Yellow Jackets, winning the Fred Biletnikoff Award and Paul Warfield Trophy in 2006. He was selected by the Lions second overall in the 2007 NFL draft.

Johnson was noted for having a rare combination of size (6 ft 5 in and 239 lbs), catching ability, speed (40-yard dash in 4.35 seconds), strength, leaping ability, and body control. In 2012, he set the NFL season record for receiving yards. Johnson is also tied with Michael Irvin for 100-yard games in a season, tied with Adam Thielen for consecutive 100-yard games, and holds the record for consecutive games with 10 or more receptions. He appeared in six consecutive Pro Bowls from 2010 to 2015 and received three consecutive first-team All-Pro selections from 2011 to 2013.

While still regarded as being in his prime, Johnson retired after the 2015 season, citing a loss of passion for the game due to health concerns and the Lions' lack of overall success during his career. He was inducted to the Pro Football Hall of Fame in 2021 and the College Football Hall of Fame in 2018.

== Early life ==
Johnson was born to Calvin Johnson Sr. and Arica Johnson on September 29, 1985, in Tyrone, Georgia. Johnson's mother holds a Doctor of Education. Johnson's parents stressed education in his childhood, forbidding him from playing sports if he didn't receive As and Bs in school.

Johnson was 6 feet tall in middle school, and 6 feet 4 inches as a sophomore in high school. He attended Sandy Creek High School in Tyrone, Georgia, and was a letterman in football and a baseball standout. In football, he was a three-year starter as a wide receiver for the Patriots football team. As a sophomore, he made 34 receptions for 646 yards and 10 touchdowns. As a junior, Johnson caught 40 passes for 736 yards and eight touchdowns. His #81 was retired on October 22, 2010.

Johnson was rated among the nation's top 10 wide receivers and top 100 players by virtually every recruiting analyst. He was tabbed the No. 4 wide receiver and No. 15 player in the nation by TheInsiders.com, and named to the Super Southern 100 by the Atlanta Journal-Constitution, the Rivals 100 by Rivals.com, TheInsiders.com Hot 100, the SuperPrep All-America 275, and the Prep Star Top 100 Dream Team.

Johnson was also rated as the best player in Georgia, No. 12 in the Southeast and No. 37 in the nation by Rivals.com, the No. 7 wide receiver in the nation by SuperPrep, and first-team all-state selection (Class AAAA) by the Atlanta Journal-Constitution. Finally, he was tabbed to the AJC's preseason Super 11. By the time he was a junior, he was ranked as within the top 10 wide receivers and the top 100 players in the nation by almost every writer. As a senior, Johnson finished as runner-up for Georgia 4A Division Player of the Year to future NFL head coach Sean McVay, then a star quarterback for Marist.

College recruiting
| Name | Hometown | School | Height | Weight | 40^{‡} | Commit date |
|---|---|---|---|---|---|---|
| Calvin Johnson; WR | Tyrone, Georgia | Sandy Creek HS | 6 ft 4 in (1.93 m) | 213 lb (97 kg) | 4.27 | Jan 12, 2004 |
| Calvin Johnson; WR | Recruit ratings: Scout: Rivals: | | | | | |
Overall recruit ranking: Scout: 3 (WR); 34 (school) Rivals: 6 (WR); 37 (national); 3 (GA); 50 (school)
‡ Refers to 40-yard dash; Note: In many cases, Scout, Rivals, 247Sports, On3, and ESPN may conflict in their listings of height, weight and 40 time.; In these cases, the average was taken. ESPN grades are on a 100-point scale.; Sources: "2004 Georgia Tech Football Commitment List". Rivals.; "2004 Georgia Tech College Football Team Recruiting Prospects". Scout.; "Scout.com Team Recruiting Rankings". Scout.; "2004 Team Ranking". Rivals.com.

== College career ==
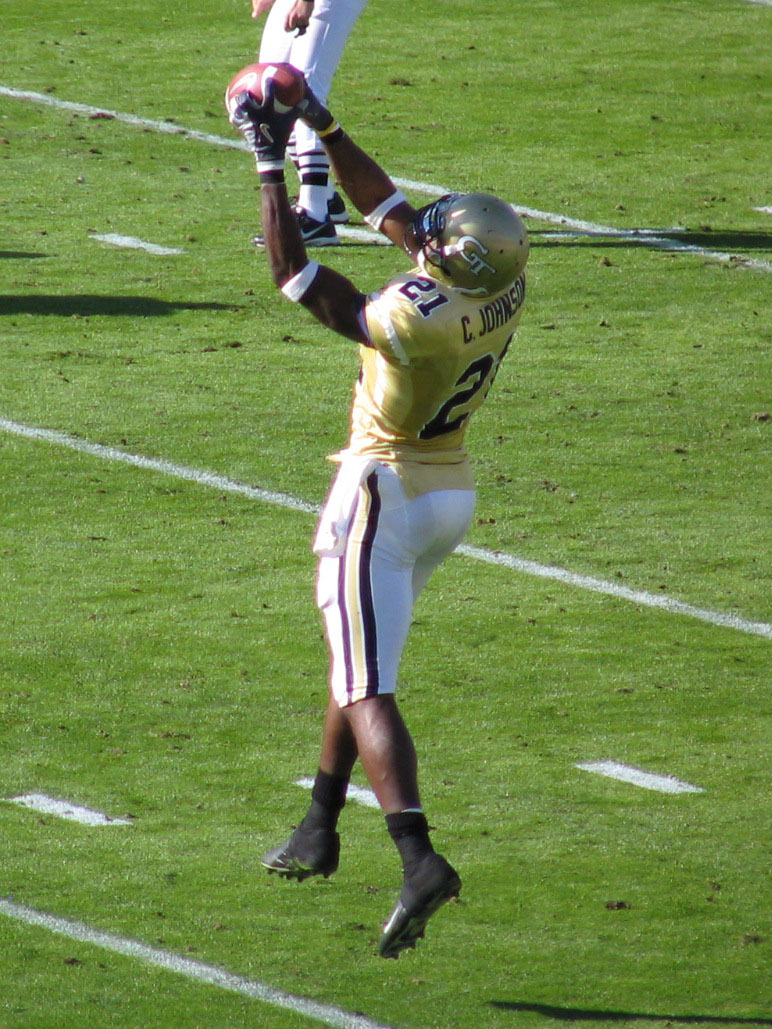
Calvin Johnson catching a pass for the Georgia Tech Yellow Jackets

Johnson attended the Georgia Institute of Technology, where he played for head coach Chan Gailey's Georgia Tech Yellow Jackets football team from 2004 to 2006. Despite Georgia Tech being interested in his playing both football and baseball, Johnson's mother refused to allow Johnson to play both sports after determining that the year-round athletic schedule would be too demanding.

As a freshman in 2004, Johnson was an immediate contributor. He made his collegiate debut against Samford and had two receptions for 45 receiving yards in the 28–7 victory. In the following game, against Clemson, he had eight receptions for 127 receiving yards and three receiving touchdowns in the 28–24 victory. On October 16, against Duke, he had six receptions for 92 receiving yards and two receiving touchdowns in the 24–7 victory. On November 13, against Connecticut, he had six receptions for 131 receiving yards in the 30–10 victory. In the next week's game against Virginia, he had five receptions for 108 receiving yards in the 30–10 loss. He ended his freshman campaign against Syracuse in the 2004 Champs Sports Bowl, where he recorded two receptions for 61 receiving yards and a receiving touchdown to go along with a rushing touchdown in the 51–14 victory. Johnson was the Yellow Jackets' leading receiver with 48 catches for 837 receiving yards and seven receiving touchdowns, which were Georgia Tech freshman records. Johnson earned a first-team All-Atlantic Coast Conference (ACC) selection. He was named ACC Rookie of the Year.

Johnson started the 2005 season with four receptions for 66 receiving yards and a receiving touchdown in a 23–14 victory over Auburn. In the next game, he had six receptions for 114 receiving yards in a 27–21 victory over North Carolina. The game featured Georgia Tech having two 100-yard receivers in the same game for the sixth time in school history, Johnson and Damarius Bilbo, who had 131. On September 24, against Virginia Tech, he had five receptions for 123 receiving yards and one receiving touchdown in the 51–7 loss. In the following game, against North Carolina State, he recorded a collegiate career-best ten receptions for 130 receiving yards and one receiving touchdown in the 17–14 loss. He earned first-team All-American honors for the 2005 season. He also earned All-ACC honors for the second straight year and was a semifinalist for the Fred Biletnikoff Award. He led the team with 54 catches for 888 receiving yards and six receiving touchdowns.

Johnson was named a team captain going into his junior season. He entered his 2006 season in the running for the Biletnikoff Award and Heisman Trophy. Although Johnson finished tenth in the Heisman voting, he won the Biletnikoff as the season's outstanding college football receiver. He started the season with seven receptions for 111 receiving yards and one receiving touchdown in the 14–10 loss to Notre Dame. In the following game, he had four receptions for 26 receiving yards and two receiving touchdowns in the 38–6 victory over Samford. Against the West Virginia Mountaineers in the Toyota Gator Bowl, Johnson had nine catches for a collegiate-career best 186 receiving yards and two receiving touchdowns, albeit in a 38–35 loss. In the game, he passed Jonathan Smith for the school record for receiving yards in a single season and also moved past Kelly Campbell to be the school's all-time leader in receiving yards for a career. In addition, Johnson's 186 receiving yards set a school record for receiving yards in a bowl game. Johnson was honored as the ACC Player of the Year, was a first-team All-ACC selection for the third consecutive year, and was recognized as a unanimous All-American. Overall, Johnson tallied 1,202 receiving yards on 76 catches. Johnson's 15 receiving touchdowns were a new Georgia Tech single-season record. In his collegiate career, Johnson made a case for being the greatest Georgia Tech player of all time. Johnson had 178 receptions for 2,927 yards and 28 touchdowns during his time with the Yellow Jackets. He ranks first in school history in career receiving yards, second in receptions, first in touchdown receptions, and first in career 100-yard receiving games with 13.

=== Academic activities ===
During the summer of 2006, Johnson, who majored in management with a background in building construction, was given the option of working on either constructing environmentally friendly luxury condos, or a project building solar latrines to improve sanitation in Bolivia. Johnson chose the latter, as he wanted to help the less fortunate. The "solar latrines" use the sun's rays to safely transform bacteria-laden waste into fertilizer.

=== Legacy ===
In 2016, Johnson was named to the Georgia Tech Sports Hall of Fame. He was selected for induction to the College Football Hall of Fame in his first year of eligibility. He was part of the Class of 2018.

== Professional career ==
=== Pre-draft ===
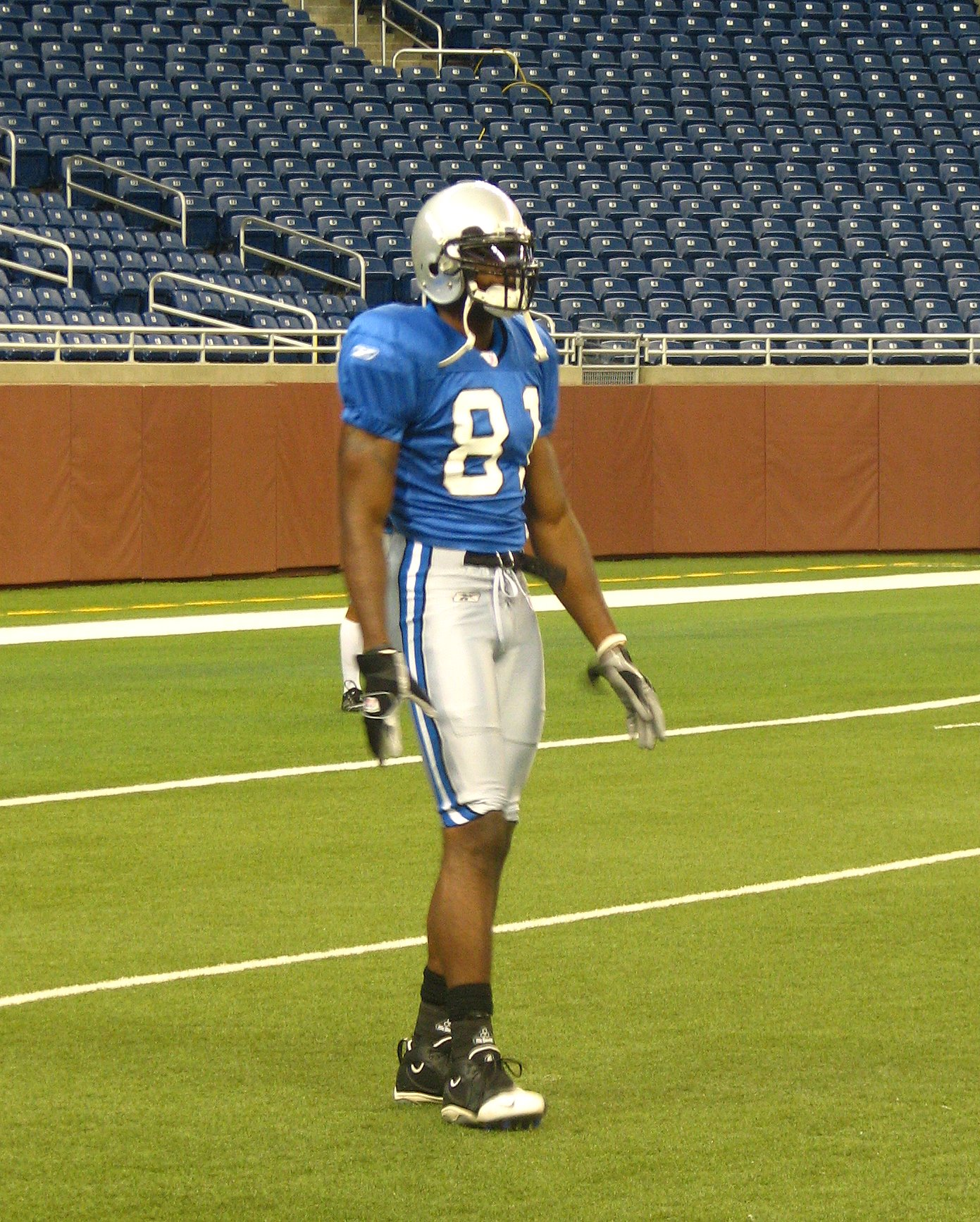
Johnson in his Detroit Lions training uniform in 2007

Johnson was SI.com's Midseason 2007 NFL draft Projection #1 pick, though Johnson had stated that he intended to earn his degree from Georgia Tech. On January 8, 2007, Johnson declared himself eligible for the NFL Draft, bypassing his senior season at Georgia Tech. He was regarded as the best athlete to come out of the draft and was the #1 player on most draft boards. Johnson was said by ESPN to be able to be productive as a rookie, much like receiver Randy Moss. In a mid-February workout with speed and conditioning coach Mark Pearsall, Johnson clocked a 4.33-second 40-yard dash, recorded an 11-foot standing broad jump, and had a vertical leap of 43 inches.

Johnson surprised many when he weighed in at 239 pounds at the combine although he claims that this season he played "at about 235 and I got up to 238" and that his weight was not a problem. Johnson ran a 4.35 and wowed scouts with his jump drill results, his receiving skills, and his 11 ft 7 in (3.53 m) broad jump, which was the "best broad jump I can ever remember an NFL prospect having," according to Gil Brandt. Johnson is one of only three players (Matt Jones and Dont'e Thornton Jr.) 6-foot-5 or taller, regardless of position, to run a 40-yard dash in under 4.40 seconds at the combine since 2005.

Johnson was selected by the Detroit Lions in the first round as the second pick overall in the 2007 NFL draft. This is the highest a Georgia Tech Yellow Jacket has ever been drafted. The Lions were expected to trade Johnson, most likely to the Tampa Bay Buccaneers, but the team announced that they were keeping him. The next day, the Detroit Tigers invited him to throw out the ceremonial first pitch.

Pre-draft measurables
| Height | Weight | Arm length | Hand span | Wingspan | 40-yard dash | 10-yard split | 20-yard split | Vertical jump | Broad jump | Wonderlic |
|---|---|---|---|---|---|---|---|---|---|---|
| 6 ft 5 in (1.96 m) | 239 lb (108 kg) | 36 in (0.91 m) | 9 3/4 in (0.25 m) | 6 ft 10 in (2.08 m) | 4.35 s | 1.55 s | 2.58 s | 42.5 in (1.08 m) | 11 ft 7 in (3.53 m) | 41 |
All values from NFL Combine and Pro Day

=== 2007 season ===
Johnson attended Reebok's NFL Rookie Premiere in Los Angeles. The Lions, being told by the league that Johnson would have to skip the minicamp to attend, rescheduled the camp to accommodate Johnson. On August 3, 2007, Johnson signed a six-year deal with the Detroit Lions after holding out for eight days, and passed his physical in time to be on the field for the start of that morning's practice. He was represented by agent James "Bus" Cook. The contract was worth up to US$64 million, with US$27.2 million in guaranteed money, making Johnson the highest-paid player in Lions history (since passed by quarterback Matthew Stafford and defensive tackle Ndamukong Suh) and the highest-paid receiver (in guaranteed money) in the NFL.

Although he did not start the game, Johnson had an impressive NFL debut on Sunday, September 9, 2007, catching four passes for 70 yards and his first career touchdown in Detroit's 36–21 win over the Oakland Raiders. He sustained a lower back injury after making a catch over two Philadelphia Eagles defenders on September 23, 2007. He scored his first and only professional rushing touchdown against the Tampa Bay Buccaneers on October 21, 2007, on a 32-yard reverse play in the 23–16 victory. Fellow teammate and wide receiver Roy Williams nicknamed Johnson "Megatron", due to his large hands being similar to that of the towering Decepticon. The nickname caught on well with fans. Williams later changed the nickname to "Bolt" after Jamaican sprinting phenom Usain Bolt, comparing the two athletes' similar height and running abilities. Johnson finished the 2007 season with 48 receptions for 756 yards and five total touchdowns. He was named to the NFL All-Rookie Team.

In 2008, Johnson said he could "still feel" the lower-back injury that bothered him throughout his rookie season. Johnson took five weeks off after the 2007 season and was taking part in the Lions' offseason program. "I know it's there but it doesn't hurt," he said. Johnson revealed that he needed Vicodin to play through the final three months of the 2007 season. He needed the medication to help him play with a bone bruise in his back. "I was on meds the rest of the season," he said. "I was taking Vicodin twice a game just to get through the game. I stayed hurt the whole season, probably because I was trying to come back too soon."

=== 2008 season ===
Johnson and the Lions faced the Atlanta Falcons on the road on September 7, 2008, in the season opener at the Georgia Dome. As the official starting wide receiver behind Roy Williams, Johnson led the team in receptions and yards, collecting seven catches for 107 yards, which included one 38-yard catch-and-run in the Lions' 34–21 loss. During week 2 versus the Green Bay Packers, he had two key touchdowns late in the game, which sparked a large comeback, though the Lions eventually lost the game, 48–25. Both touchdown catches included a run after the catch (the first catch going for 38 yards and the second going for 47 yards, both over the middle) displaying Johnson's speed and breakaway ability. He ended the game with six receptions for 129 yards and two touchdowns. In the following two games, losses to San Francisco and Chicago, Johnson failed to score a touchdown or gain over 50 yards receiving. However, against the Minnesota Vikings, Johnson had four receptions for 85 yards and his third touchdown of the season.

On October 14, before the week 6 trade deadline, Roy Williams was traded to the Dallas Cowboys for a first, a third and a seventh-round pick in the 2009 NFL draft, making Johnson the Lions' starting wide receiver and the last big threat on the offense. In his first game without Roy Williams alongside him in the week 7 game against the Houston Texans, Johnson caught only two passes, totaling 154 yards receiving; the first pass did not come until quarterback Dan Orlovsky threw a pass up for grabs at the end of the first half which Johnson caught for 58 yards and the second pass came on a 96-yard touchdown catch-and-run. With Williams gone and starting quarterback Jon Kitna lost to injury for the season, the Texans defense had little to do to stop the Lions' offense and shut down Johnson, winning the game 28–21.

Johnson set a career-high for receptions in a game during the Week-9 match-up against the Lions' division rivals, the Chicago Bears, with eight receptions that garnered 94 yards and one touchdown, but still lost the game 27–23. During week 10, formerly retired All-Pro quarterback Daunte Culpepper was signed to a one-year contract with the Lions in hopes to spur the offense and earned the starting job for the next two games. Johnson ended his first game with Culpepper at quarterback with two receptions for 92 yards in a 38–14 loss to the Jacksonville Jaguars. During the week 14 match-up against the division rival Minnesota Vikings, Johnson passed the 1,000-yard receiving mark for the first time in his career after collecting three catches for 84 yards and one touchdown, ending the week with 1,055 yards receiving and nine touchdowns on the season.

Johnson and the 2008 Detroit Lions finished the first ever 0–16 season in NFL history after a 31–21 loss to the Green Bay Packers in week 17. Despite the Lions' failures and the fact that five different quarterbacks played during the year, Johnson finished as one of the strongest wide receivers statistically for the 2008 season, finishing fifth in receiving yards (1,331) and 7th in receiving yards per game (83.2), and leading the league in receiving touchdowns (12), despite the fact that the entire Lions team only passed for 18 touchdowns. Johnson became the first Lion to lead the NFL in receiving touchdowns since Terry Barr in 1963. However, Johnson missed the Pro Bowl, with most experts attributing the snub to the Lions' dismal winless season.

=== 2009 season ===
After 2008, Detroit's front office and coaching personnel were essentially overhauled by the team ownership. Matt Millen, the team's incumbent general manager and CEO since 2001, was terminated on September 24, 2008. Head coach Rod Marinelli was fired in the offseason. Marinelli was replaced by Jim Schwartz, then defensive coordinator of the Tennessee Titans. Schwartz ultimately revamped the entire Detroit offensive (and defensive) philosophies‍—‌hiring Scott Linehan and Gunther Cunningham, respectively. Detroit held the first pick in the 2009 NFL draft, and selected quarterback Matthew Stafford out of the University of Georgia. Stafford was named the team's starting quarterback out of training camp, but he battled various injuries throughout the season. Much of the 2008 Detroit roster was released by the new regime, and the 2009 team was viewed as somewhat of a work-in-progress and eventually finished with a 2–14 record. In Week 4, on the road against the Chicago Bears, he had eight receptions for 133 yards in the 48–24 loss. In Week 11, against the Cleveland Browns, he had seven receptions for 161 yards and a touchdown in the 38–37 win. In Week 13, on the road against the Cincinnati Bengals, he had six receptions for 123 yards and a touchdown in the 23–13 loss. Johnson finished the 2009 season with 67 receptions, 984 yards, and five touchdowns, while missing two games.

=== 2010 season ===
In the season opener against the Chicago Bears, Johnson caught a pass with 31 seconds left in regulation in the end zone for what looked like a game-winning touchdown. However, referee Gene Steratore ruled the catch incomplete, saying that Johnson had not maintained possession of the ball through the entire process of the catch. The Lions lost the game by a score of 19–14. This later became known as the "Calvin Johnson rule" when subsequently applied to other receivers and catches. In week 6, against the New York Giants, he had five receptions for 146 yards and one receiving touchdown in the 28–20 loss. In week 8, against the Washington Redskins, he had nine receptions for 101 receiving yards and three receiving touchdowns in the 37–25 victory. In week 10, against the Buffalo Bills, he had ten receptions for 128 receiving yards and one receiving touchdown in the 14–12 loss. The Bills game was the beginning of a four-game streak for Johnson where he recorded a receiving touchdown. In week 15, against the Tampa Bay Buccaneers, he had ten receptions for 152 receiving yards in the 23–20 victory. Johnson amassed 77 receptions for 1,120 yards and 12 touchdowns during the 2010 season. He was selected to the first Pro Bowl of his career. Following the 2010 season, Johnson was the recipient of the Lions/Detroit Sports Broadcasters Association/Pro Football Writers Association (Detroit Chapter) Media-Friendly Good Guy Award. Johnson was ranked 27th by his fellow players on the NFL Top 100 Players of 2011.

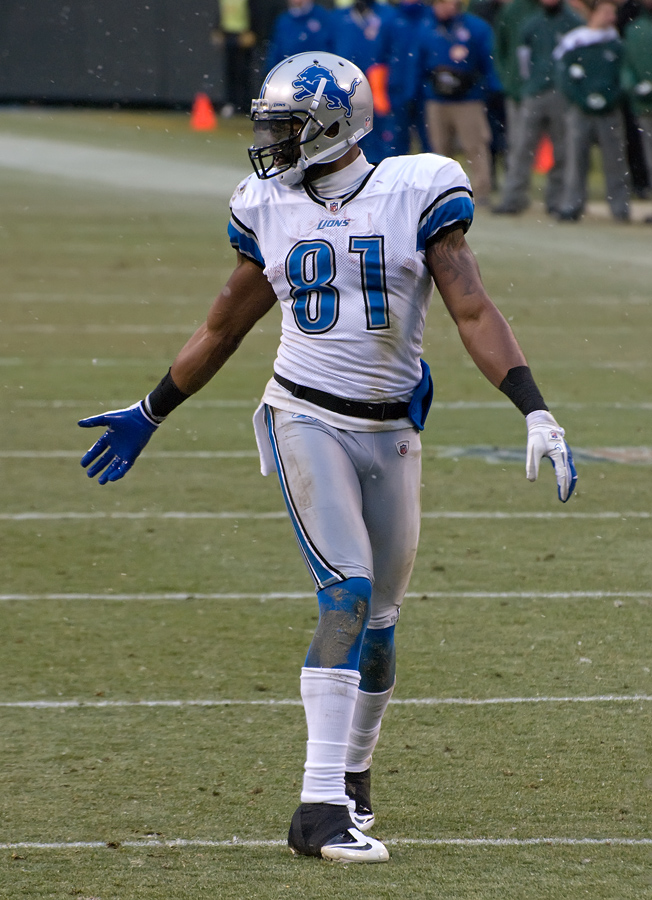
Johnson on January 1, 2012

=== 2011 season ===
In week 4 against the Dallas Cowboys, Johnson helped rally the Lions from a 24-point deficit to a 34–30 victory by catching two touchdown passes in the fourth quarter, including a famous catch in which Johnson beat the Cowboys' triple coverage in the end zone. This performance gave Johnson eight touchdown receptions through the first four games of the season and tied Cris Carter for most consecutive games with multiple touchdown receptions with four. In a week 15 game against the Oakland Raiders, Johnson had nine receptions for 214 receiving yards and two receiving touchdowns in the 28–27 victory. He joined Cloyce Box as the only players in franchise history to record at least 200 receiving yards and two receiving touchdowns in the same game. Johnson and the Lions clinched a playoff spot for the first time since 1999, and the first time in Johnson's career, after a 38–10 beating of the San Diego Chargers on Christmas Eve. In a week 17 game against the Green Bay Packers, Johnson had 11 receptions for a then career-best 244 receiving yards in a 45–41 loss. Johnson finished the season with 96 receptions for a league-leading 1,681 receiving yards and 16 receiving touchdowns. Johnson became the first Lion to lead the league in receiving yards since Pat Studstill in 1966. The Lions finished with a 10–6 record, finished second in the NFC North, and earned a playoff berth.

Detroit found themselves on the road again in a 2012 NFC Wild Card game against the heavily favored New Orleans Saints in the playoffs. Always tough to play against at the Superdome, the Saints wore down the Detroit defense and New Orleans would go on to a win by a score of 45–28. In the game, Johnson caught 12 passes for 211 receiving yards and two touchdowns‍—‌breaking Detroit's playoff record of 150 receiving yards in a playoff game previously held by Brett Perriman and Leonard Thompson. Johnson was ranked third by his fellow players on the NFL Top 100 Players of 2012.

=== 2012 season ===
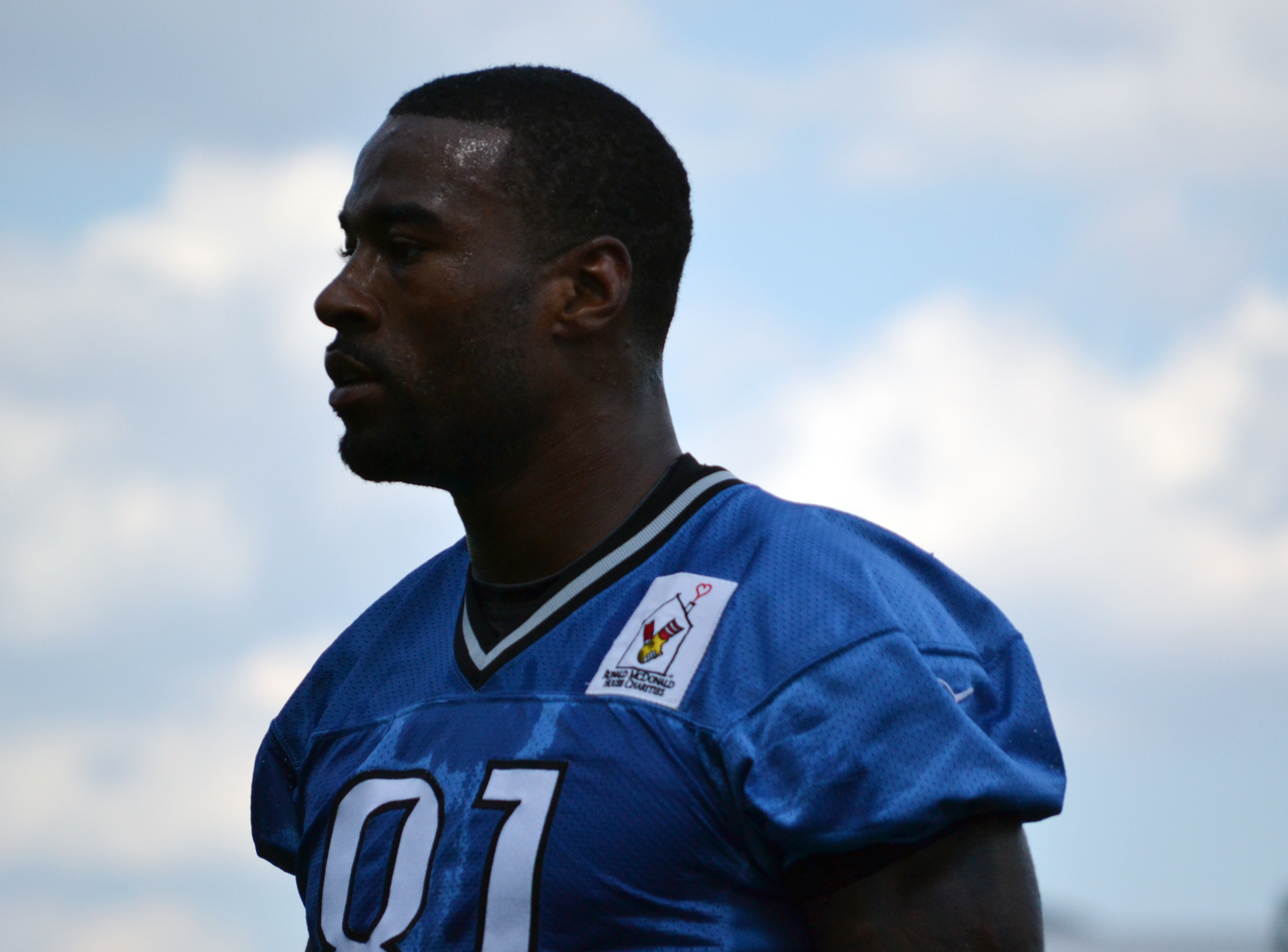
Johnson at training camp in 2012

On March 14, 2012, Johnson signed an eight-year extension worth US$132 million with the Detroit Lions, with US$60 million guaranteed, making Johnson the highest-paid receiver in the league. Johnson beat out 42 other players and eliminated quarterback Cam Newton to win the Madden NFL 13 cover athlete on April 25, 2012, on SportsNation. Johnson started off the season with six receptions for 111 yards in a 27–23 victory over the St. Louis Rams. In week 3, against the Tennessee Titans, he had 10 receptions for 164 yards and a touchdown in the 44–41 loss. In week 6, against the Philadelphia Eagles, he had six receptions for 135 yards in the 26–23 victory. In the stretch from week 9 to week 14, he recorded five consecutive games with 125 receiving yards or more, which tied the NFL record held by Pat Studstill in the 1966 season. In that stretch were performances of 207 yards and a touchdown in a 34–24 loss to the Minnesota Vikings and 171 yards and a touchdown in a 35–33 loss to the Indianapolis Colts. In the Colts game, Johnson was targeted a career-high 20 times. On December 22, against the Atlanta Falcons, Johnson broke Jerry Rice's single-season receiving yards record of 1,848 yards. Johnson was also named a starter for the NFC in the Pro Bowl played in Honolulu, Hawaii. Johnson finished with five receptions for 72 yards against the Chicago Bears in week 17, missing out on 2,000 receiving yards by 36. Johnson finished the season leading the league in receptions (122) and receiving yards (1,964). Johnson became the only player in the Super Bowl era (since 1967) to average 120 yards per game in a season, when he averaged 122.8 yards per game in 2012. Johnson was ranked third by his fellow players on the NFL Top 100 Players of 2013.

=== 2013 season ===
After a slow start to the 2013 season in week 1 against the Minnesota Vikings, Johnson had six receptions for 116 yards and two touchdowns in a 25–21 loss to the Arizona Cardinals. In the following game, against the Washington Redskins, he had seven receptions for 115 receiving yards and a touchdown in the 27–20 victory. In week 7, against the Cincinnati Bengals, he had nine receptions for 155 yards and two receiving touchdowns. On October 27, in a 31–30 win over the Dallas Cowboys, Johnson caught a career-high 14 of 16 passes thrown in his direction; he finished the game with a career-high 329 receiving yards and one touchdown. In addition to breaking the Lions' franchise record of 302 receiving yards set by Cloyce Box on December 3, 1950, it was the highest receiving yardage ever in a regulation-length game and the second-highest overall single-game yardage in NFL history, behind Flipper Anderson's 336-yard performance in a 1989 overtime win. Anderson accumulated 40 of those yards in overtime. In this same game, Johnson tied Lance Alworth for the most career games with at least 200 yards receiving with five. In week 10 against the Chicago Bears, Johnson had six receptions for 83 yards and two touchdown receptions. The second one gave him the Lions all-time record for touchdown catches with 63, breaking the old mark previously held by Herman Moore. In the following game, he had six receptions for 179 yards and two receiving touchdowns in the 37–27 loss to the Pittsburgh Steelers in week 11. Following the Steelers game, he added two more 100-yard performances in Weeks 12–13 against the Tampa Bay Buccaneers and Green Bay Packers.

Overall, he finished the 2013 season with 84 receptions, 1,492 receiving yards, and 12 receiving touchdowns in 14 games. Johnson was named to the 2014 Pro Bowl, but an injury forced him to withdraw. Johnson was ranked second by his fellow players on the NFL Top 100 Players of 2014.

=== 2014 season ===
Johnson started the 2014 season off strong with seven receptions for 164 yards and two receiving touchdowns in a 35–14 victory over the New York Giants on Monday Night Football. Johnson suffered an ankle injury that kept him out of action after week 5. He returned in week 10 against the Miami Dolphins and had seven receptions for 113 yards and a touchdown in the 20–16 victory. On November 27, in the annual Thanksgiving Day game against the Chicago Bears, Johnson became the fastest player to reach 10,000 receiving yards in NFL history at the time, eclipsing the mark in the second quarter of his 115th game. Against the Bears, he had 11 receptions for 146 yards and two receiving touchdowns in the 34–17 victory. In the next game against the Tampa Bay Buccaneers, he had eight receptions for 158 yards and a receiving touchdown in the 34–17 victory. He closed the season out with four receptions for 39 yards and two receiving touchdowns in a 30–20 loss to the Green Bay Packers. The Lions finished with a 11–5 record and earned a playoff spot in the Wild Card Round. In the 24–20 loss to the Dallas Cowboys, he had five receptions for 85 receiving yards.

Johnson was named to his fifth consecutive Pro Bowl, the most by any Lion since Barry Sanders was named to ten consecutive Pro Bowls. He finished the 2014 season with 71 receptions for 1,044 receiving yards and receiving eight touchdowns. Johnson and Golden Tate became the Lions' first duo to reach 1,000 yards apiece in the same season since Roy Williams and Mike Furrey in 2006. Johnson was ranked sixth by his fellow players on the NFL Top 100 Players of 2015.

=== 2015 season ===
Much like week 1 in Chicago five years back, in week 4 at Seattle, Johnson was involved in another controversial play. This time, late in the fourth quarter, Seahawks safety Kam Chancellor punched the ball out of Johnson's hands while he was trying to score a late go-ahead touchdown. Linebacker K. J. Wright then batted the ball out of the end zone for a touchback. The NFL later admitted the referees should have penalized Wright for illegal batting. The Seahawks won the game by a score of 13–10. In week 5, a 42–17 loss to the Arizona Cardinals, Johnson caught his 671st career pass, breaking Herman Moore's franchise record. In week 6, Johnson caught six passes for 166 yards in an overtime 37–34 victory over the Chicago Bears. This gave the Lions their first victory of the season after an 0–5 start. This was his fourth NFC Offensive Player of the Week nomination for his effort against the Bears. In week 12, against the Philadelphia Eagles, Johnson caught eight passes for 93 yards and three touchdowns to help lead the Lions to their third straight victory and lift their record to 4–7. In week 8 against the Kansas City Chiefs in the NFL International Series on November 1, Johnson became the fastest player to reach 11,000 receiving yards in NFL history, in his 127th game. Johnson finished the season with 88 receptions for 1,214 yards (13.8 average), and nine touchdowns, reaching 1,000-yards receiving for the sixth consecutive year, and seventh time in nine years. Johnson was named to the Pro Bowl for the sixth consecutive year, but he declined to attend. His 1,214 yards in the 2015 season are the most ever in a player's final season in the NFL, while his 88 receptions are the second most in a player's final season, trailing Sterling Sharpe's 94 receptions in the 1994 season.

=== Retirement ===
On March 8, 2016, Johnson announced his retirement from the NFL after nine seasons. His 11,619 receiving yards rank fourth in a player's first nine seasons, trailing only Julio Jones (12,125), Torry Holt (11,864) and Jerry Rice (11,776). Since Johnson was drafted by the Lions with the second overall pick in the 2007 NFL Draft, no player had more receiving yards, receiving touchdowns, and 100-yard games (46) than Johnson through the 2015 season. His 5,137 receiving yards from 2011 to 2013 are the most by any player over a three-year stretch in NFL history. On February 6, 2021, Johnson was elected to the Pro Football Hall of Fame in his first year of eligibility.

Despite spending his entire nine-year career with the Lions, Johnson did not partake in any events or attend games being played by his former team, until 2023. He has stated this was because the Lions forced him to repay $1.6 million of his signing bonus for retiring early and not playing out his contract. The Lions offered to pay Johnson $500,000 a year for three years to show up and speak at team events and donate an additional $100,000 to a charity of his choice, but he did not accept the offer, stating, "they need to figure out a way to do it and not have me work for it. Because I already did the work for it". He has said on multiple occasions that things between him and his former team will never be made right until then and has gone on to say that ownership views the team's players as "pawns". More recently, Johnson's stance has softened as he attended several Detroit Lions team practices during the 2023 season and the September 17, 2023, home game against the Seattle Seahawks. Johnson was seen supporting the Lions at Ford Field as they secured their first playoff win since 1992 where they beat the Los Angeles Rams 24–23.

== Career statistics ==
Legend
| | NFL record |
| | Led the league |
| **Bold** | Career high |

=== NFL ===
==== Regular season ====
| Year | Team | Games | | Receiving | | | | | Rushing | | | | | Fumbles | |
| Year | Team | GP | GS | Rec | Yds | Avg | Lng | TD | Att | Yds | Avg | Lng | TD | Fum | Lost |
|---|---|---|---|---|---|---|---|---|---|---|---|---|---|---|---|
| 2007 | DET | 15 | 10 | 48 | 756 | 15.8 | 49 | 4 | 4 | 52 | **13.0** | **32T** | **1** | 1 | 0 |
| 2008 | DET | 16 | 16 | 78 | 1,331 | 17.1 | **96T** | 12 | 3 | −1 | −0.3 | 7 | 0 | **3** | 2 |
| 2009 | DET | 14 | 14 | 67 | 984 | 14.7 | 75T | 5 | **7** | **73** | 10.4 | 19 | 0 | **3** | 2 |
| 2010 | DET | 15 | 15 | 77 | 1,120 | 14.5 | 87T | 12 | 4 | 32 | 8.0 | 15 | 0 | 1 | 0 |
| 2011 | DET | 16 | 16 | 96 | 1,681 | 17.5 | 73T | **16** | 1 | 11 | 11.0 | 11 | 0 | 1 | 1 |
| 2012 | DET | 16 | 16 | **122** | **1,964** | 16.1 | 53 | 5 | — | — | — | — | — | **3** | **3** |
| 2013 | DET | 14 | 14 | 84 | 1,492 | **17.8** | 87 | 12 | — | — | — | — | — | 1 | 1 |
| 2014 | DET | 13 | 13 | 71 | 1,077 | 15.2 | 67T | 8 | — | — | — | — | — | 0 | 0 |
| 2015 | DET | 16 | 16 | 88 | 1,214 | 13.8 | 57 | 9 | — | — | — | — | — | 1 | 1 |
| Career | | 135 | 130 | 731 | 11,619 | 15.9 | 96T | 83 | 19 | 167 | 8.8 | 32T | 1 | 14 | 10 |

==== Postseason ====
| Year | Team | Games | | Receiving | | | | | Rushing | | | | | Fumbles | |
| Year | Team | GP | GS | Rec | Yds | Avg | Lng | TD | Att | Yds | Avg | Lng | TD | Fum | Lost |
|---|---|---|---|---|---|---|---|---|---|---|---|---|---|---|---|
| 2011 | DET | 1 | 1 | **12** | **211** | **17.6** | **42** | **2** | — | — | — | — | — | 0 | 0 |
| 2014 | DET | 1 | 1 | 5 | 85 | 17.0 | 28 | 0 | — | — | — | — | — | 0 | 0 |
| Career | | 2 | 2 | 17 | 296 | 17.4 | 42 | 2 | 0 | 0 | 0.0 | 0 | 0 | 0 | 0 |

=== College ===
| Year | Team | GP | Receiving | | | | Rushing | | | |
| Year | Team | GP | Rec | Yds | Avg | TD | Att | Yds | Avg | TD |
|---|---|---|---|---|---|---|---|---|---|---|
| 2004 | Georgia Tech | 12 | 48 | 837 | **17.4** | 7 | 3 | 10 | 3.3 | **1** |
| 2005 | Georgia Tech | 12 | 54 | 908 | 16.4 | 6 | 0 | 0 | 0.0 | 0 |
| 2006 | Georgia Tech | 14 | **76** | **1,202** | 15.8 | **15** | **7** | **30** | **4.3** | 0 |
| Career | | 38 | 178 | 2,927 | 16.4 | 28 | 10 | 40 | 4.0 | 1 |

== Career highlights ==
=== Awards and honors ===
==== NFL ====
- 3× First-team All-Pro (2011–2013)
- Second-team All-Pro (2010)
- 6× Pro Bowl (2010–2015)
- 2× NFL receiving yards leader (2011, 2012)
- NFL receptions leader (2012)
- NFL receiving touchdowns leader (2008)
- NFL 2010s All-Decade Team
- PFWA All-Rookie Team (2007)
- NFL Moment of the Year (2013)
- Detroit Lions All-Time Team
- Pride of the Lions
- 4× NFC Offensive Player of the Week (2010 – Week 8, 2011 – Week 15, 2013 – Week 8, 2015 – Week 6)
- 2× NFC Offensive Player of the Month (November 2012, October 2013)
- 5× NFL Top 100 — 27th (2011), 3rd (2012), 3rd (2013), 2nd (2014), 6th (2015)

==== College ====
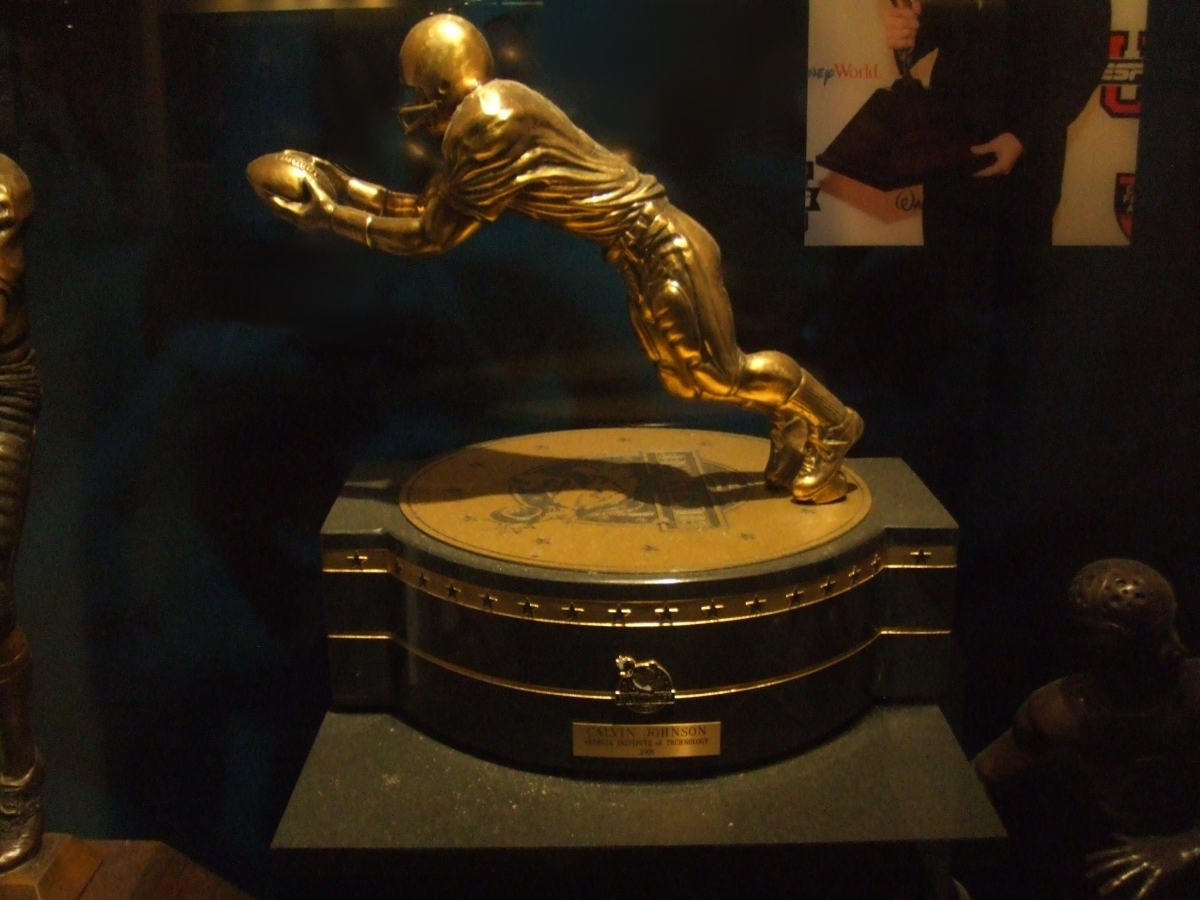
Calvin Johnson's Fred Biletnikoff Award

- First-team Freshman All-American 2004
- All-American 2005 and 2006
- First-team All-Atlantic Coast Conference, 2004, 2005, and 2006
- ACC Rookie of the Year, 2004
- ACC Player of the Year, 2006
- Four-time ACC Rookie of the Week
- Biletnikoff Award, 2006
- Paul Warfield Trophy, 2006
- 10th place in 2006 Heisman Trophy voting – 43 total votes (76 receptions, 1,202 yards, 15.8 avg, 15 touchdowns)
- Selected for induction into the College Football Hall of Fame in his first year of eligibility

=== Records ===
==== NFL records ====
- Most receiving yards in a single season (16 games): 1,964 yards (2012)
- Seasons with 1,600 yards receiving (2, tied with Marvin Harrison, Torry Holt, Antonio Brown, Julio Jones, Justin Jefferson, and Tyreek Hill)
- Most consecutive games with at least 100 receiving yards (8, tied with Adam Thielen)
- Most consecutive games with at least 10 receptions (4)
- Most 100 receiving yard games in a single season (11, tied with Michael Irvin)
- Most receiving yards in a five-game span (861 yards)
- Most receiving yards in a six-game span (962 yards)
- Most receiving yards in a single game in regulation: 329 (October 27, 2013, against the Dallas Cowboys)
- Most games with at least 200 receiving yards: 5 (tied with Lance Alworth)

==== Lions franchise records ====
- Most receiving touchdowns in a single season: 16 (2011)
- Most receiving touchdowns, career: 83
- Most receiving yards, career: 11,619
- Most receptions in a single game: 14 (October 27, 2013, against the Dallas Cowboys, tied with Herman Moore)
- Most receiving yards in a single game: 329 (October 27, 2013, against the Dallas Cowboys)
- Most receptions, career: 731
- Most seasons with 10+ receiving touchdowns: 4
- Most career 70+ yard receptions: 8
- Most games with multiple touchdowns in one half: 12
- Most receiving yards in a single game in regulation (329, October 27, 2013, against the Dallas Cowboys)
- Most games with at least 100 receiving yards: 46
- Most games with at least 150 receiving yards: 15
- Most games with at least 200 receiving yards: 5
- Most games with at least 300 receiving yards: 1
- Most games with at least one receiving touchdown: 64
- Most games with at least two receiving touchdowns: 17

==== School records ====
- Receiving yards for a career – 2,927
- Receiving yards in a single season – 1,202 (2006)
- Receiving touchdowns for a career – 28
- Receiving touchdowns in a single season – 15 (2006)
- 100-yard games in a career – 13
- 100-yard games in a single season – 7 (2006)

== Dancing with the Stars ==
On August 30, 2016, Johnson was announced as one of the celebrities who would compete on season 23 of Dancing with the Stars. He was partnered with professional dancer Lindsay Arnold. He finished in third place to James Hinchcliffe and Laurie Hernandez.

| Week | Dance / Song | Judges' score | | | | Result |
|---|---|---|---|---|---|---|
| Week | Dance / Song | Inaba | Goodman | Hough | Tonioli | Result |
| 1 | Cha-cha-cha / "That's What I Like" | 7 | 6 | 6 | 7 | No elimination |
| 2 | Foxtrot / "As Days Go By" | 7 | 7 | 7 | 7 | Safe |
| 3 | Viennese Waltz / "It's a Woman's World" | 8 | 8 | 8 | 8 | Safe (Immunity) |
| 4 | Charleston / "Bella Donna Twist" | 8 | 8 | 7 | 8 | Safe |
| 5 | Jazz / "Ain't No Mountain High Enough" | 8 | 8 | 8 | 8 | No elimination |
| 6 | Argentine Tango / "Hotel California" | 9 | 10 | 9 | 9 | Last to be called safe |
| 7 | Jive / "Good Golly, Miss Molly"; Team Freestyle / "The Skye Boat Song" | 9; 10 | 9; 9 | 9; 9 | 9; 10 | Safe |
| 8 | Quickstep / "Dr. Bones"; Jive Dance Off / "The Purple People Eater" | 10; No | 10; Extra | 10; Points | 10; Awarded | Safe |
| 9 | Waltz / "Memory"; Team-Up Dance (Paso Doble) / "No Good" | 9; 9 | 9; 9 | 10; 10 | 9; 9 | Safe |
| 10; Semifinals | Tango / "Seven Nation Army"; Trio Salsa / "Limbo" | 8; 10 | 9; 10 | 9; 10 | 9; 10 | Last to be called safe |
| 11; Finals | Viennese Waltz / "I Am Your Man"; Freestyle / "Please Mr. Postman" & "I Want You Back"; Jive & Quickstep Fusion / "Tutti Frutti" | 8; 10; 10 | 9; 10; 10 | 9; 10; 10 | 9; 10; 10 | Third Place |

== Cannabis ==
In February 2019, Johnson and his wife Brittney were granted preliminary approval to open a medical cannabis dispensary in Michigan. He has since proceeded with plans to launch several cannabis facilities across the state (along with his business partner Rob Sims) under the brand name Primitiv. In August 2019, Johnson was named to the board of directors of the Michigan Cannabis Industry Association.

Also in August 2019, Johnson announced a partnership with Harvard University to study the effects of cannabis on chronic traumatic encephalopathy (CTE) and its benefits in managing pain. As part of the partnership, Johnson and Sims announced a six-figure donation to the International Phytomedicines and Medical Cannabis Institute at Harvard. In his Hall of Fame induction speech, Johnson noted his work with Harvard and the potential for plant-based medicines to "provide an alternative to their destructive counterparts, opioids".

== Personal life ==
Johnson founded The Calvin Johnson Jr. Foundation, Inc. in 2008. The foundation's goals include dedication to education, training, and social development of at-risk youth and providing financial aide to various community organizations. The Foundation hosts an annual camp called Catching Dreams, which aims to help high school wide receivers.

Johnson became engaged to long-time girlfriend Brittney McNorton in March 2015. They were married in June 2016. The couple resides in Detroit. He has three sons named Caleb, Calvin III, and Carter.

Johnson is a Christian. He has a tattoo of the crucifixion of Jesus on his left arm and a Christian cross on his right arm. Johnson was part of a weekly Bible study group with other Lions players.

== See also ==
- List of Detroit Lions first-round draft picks
- List of National Football League annual receiving yards leaders
- List of National Football League annual receiving touchdowns leaders
- List of National Football League annual receptions leaders
- List of Pro Football Hall of Fame inductees
- National Football League 2010s All-Decade Team
