= 2006 Georgia Tech Yellow Jackets football team =

American college football season

2006 Georgia Tech Yellow Jackets football

ACC Coastal Division champion

ACC Championship Game, L 6–9 vs. Wake Forest

Gator Bowl, L 35–38 vs. West Virginia
- Conference: Atlantic Coast Conference
- Coastal
- Record: 9–5 (7–1 ACC)
- Head coach: Chan Gailey (5th season)
- Offensive coordinator: Patrick Nix (5th season)
- Offensive scheme: Mixed Shotgun & Ace
- Defensive coordinator: Jon Tenuta (5th season)
- Base defense: Zone Blitz
- Home stadium: Bobby Dodd Stadium

2006 Atlantic Coast Conference football standings
	Conf.			Overall
Team	W		L	W		L
Atlantic Division
No. 18 Wake Forest x$	6	–	2	11	–	3
No. 20 Boston College	5	–	3	10	–	3
Maryland	5	–	3	9	–	4
Clemson	5	–	3	8	–	5
Florida State	3	–	5	7	–	6
NC State	2	–	6	3	–	9
Coastal Division
Georgia Tech x	7	–	1	9	–	5
No. 19 Virginia Tech	6	–	2	10	–	3
Virginia	4	–	4	5	–	7
Miami (FL)	3	–	5	7	–	6
North Carolina	2	–	6	3	–	9
Duke	0	–	8	0	–	12
Championship: Wake Forest 9, Georgia Tech 6
$ – BCS representative as conference champion; x – Division champion/co-champions; Rankings from AP Poll

The 2006 Georgia Tech Yellow Jackets football team represented the Georgia Institute of Technology in the 2006 NCAA Division I FBS football season. The team's coach was former Dallas Cowboys, Samford Bulldogs, and Troy Trojans coach Chan Gailey. The Yellow Jackets played their home games at Bobby Dodd Stadium in Atlanta.

== Schedule ==
Date	Time	Opponent	Rank	Site	TV	Result	Attendance	Source
September 2	8:00 p.m.	No. 2 Notre Dame*		Bobby Dodd Stadium; Atlanta (rivalry, College GameDay)	ABC	L 10–14	56,680	
September 9	3:30 p.m.	Samford*		Bobby Dodd Stadium; Atlanta, GA		W 38–6	47,149	
September 16	1:30 p.m.	Troy*		Bobby Dodd Stadium; Atlanta, GA		W 35–20	45,637	
September 21	7:30 p.m.	Virginia		Bobby Dodd Stadium; Atlanta, GA	ESPN	W 24–7	51,081	
September 30	3:30 p.m.	at No. 11 Virginia Tech	No. 24	Lane Stadium; Blacksburg, VA (rivalry)	ABC	W 38–27	66,233	
October 7	3:30 p.m.	Maryland	No. 18	Bobby Dodd Stadium; Atlanta, GA	ESPNU	W 27–23	51,686	
October 21	7:45 p.m.	at No. 12 Clemson	No. 13	Memorial Stadium; Clemson, SC (College GameDay)	ESPN	L 7–31	82,630	
October 28	3:30 p.m.	Miami (FL)^{†}	No. 21	Bobby Dodd Stadium; Atlanta, GA	ABC	W 30–23	55,320	
November 4	7:00 p.m.	at NC State	No. 20	Carter–Finley Stadium; Raleigh, NC	ESPNU	W 31–23	56,837	
November 11	12:00 p.m.	at North Carolina	No. 19	Kenan Stadium; Chapel Hill, NC	Raycom/LFS	W 7–0	41,000	
November 18	1:30 p.m.	Duke	No. 18	Bobby Dodd Stadium; Atlanta, GA		W 49–21	46,768	
November 25	3:30 p.m.	at Georgia*	No. 16	Sanford Stadium; Athens, GA (Clean, Old-Fashioned Hate)	CBS Sports	L 12–15	92,746	
December 2	1:00 p.m.	vs. No. 16 Wake Forest	No. 23	Alltel Stadium; Jacksonville, FL (ACC Championship)	ABC	L 6–9	62,850	
January 1	1:00 p.m.	vs. No. 13 West Virginia*		Alltel Stadium; Jacksonville, FL (Gator Bowl)	CBS	L 35–38	67,714	
*Non-conference game; ^{†}Homecoming; Rankings from AP Poll released prior to the game; All times are in Eastern time

== Preseason ==
Head coach Chan Gailey returned for his fifth year at the helm of the program. Senior Reggie Ball (QB) was expected to lead the team as a seasoned veteran with three full years of starting behind him. Junior Calvin Johnson (WR) was considered by many sports writers to be the top wide receiver in the nation. Oklahoma transfer Tashard Choice (RB) found the starting job behind an experienced offensive line.

Georgia Tech was in some pre-season top 25 polls.

=== Preseason awards ===
Preseason Football Buzz

- Calvin Johnson – All-America First Team
- Joe Anoa'i – Lindy's All-ACC First Team
- KaMichael Hall – Sporting News' All-ACC First Team
- Kenny scott – Sporting News' All-ACC First Team
- Reggie Ball – Athlon's All-ACC Third Team
- Andrew gardner – Sporting News All-ACC Second Team
- Mike cox – Sporting News All-ACC First Team

== Rankings ==
Ranking movements Legend: ██ Increase in ranking ██ Decrease in ranking — = Not ranked RV = Received votes т = Tied with team above or below
	Week															
Poll	Pre	1	2	3	4	5	6	7	8	9	10	11	12	13	14	Final
AP	RV	RV	RV	RV	24	18	13	13	21	20	19	18	16	23	RV	RV
Coaches	RV	RV	RV	RV	RV	20	15	13	21	20	18	18	15	22	25T	RV
Harris	Not released				—	20	15	13	22	20	19	18	16	22	25	Not released
BCS	Not released							19	24	20	18	18	16	22	—	Not released

== Game summaries ==
=== Notre Dame ===
Uniform Combination
Helmet	Jersey	Pants

	1	2	3	4	Total
#3 Fighting Irish	0	7	7	0	14
Yellow Jackets	7	3	0	0	10

The game began with Georgia Tech taking a 10–0 lead over the Irish. Reggie Ball connected with Calvin Johnson for a touchdown and Travis Bell kicked a field goal. At the end of the first half, Notre Dame finally scored on a Brady Quinn quarterback draw. The second half featured two relentless defenses. Notre Dame would score the final points in the game on a Darius Walker touchdown run. The run followed a controversial late hit penalty, which took Notre Dame from 4th down to 1st down and goal. The game had no turnovers and was highlighted by Calvin Johnson's 7 receptions, 110 yards receiving, and touchdown and Reggie Ball's 207 all-purpose yards.

=== Samford ===
Uniform Combination
Helmet	Jersey	Pants

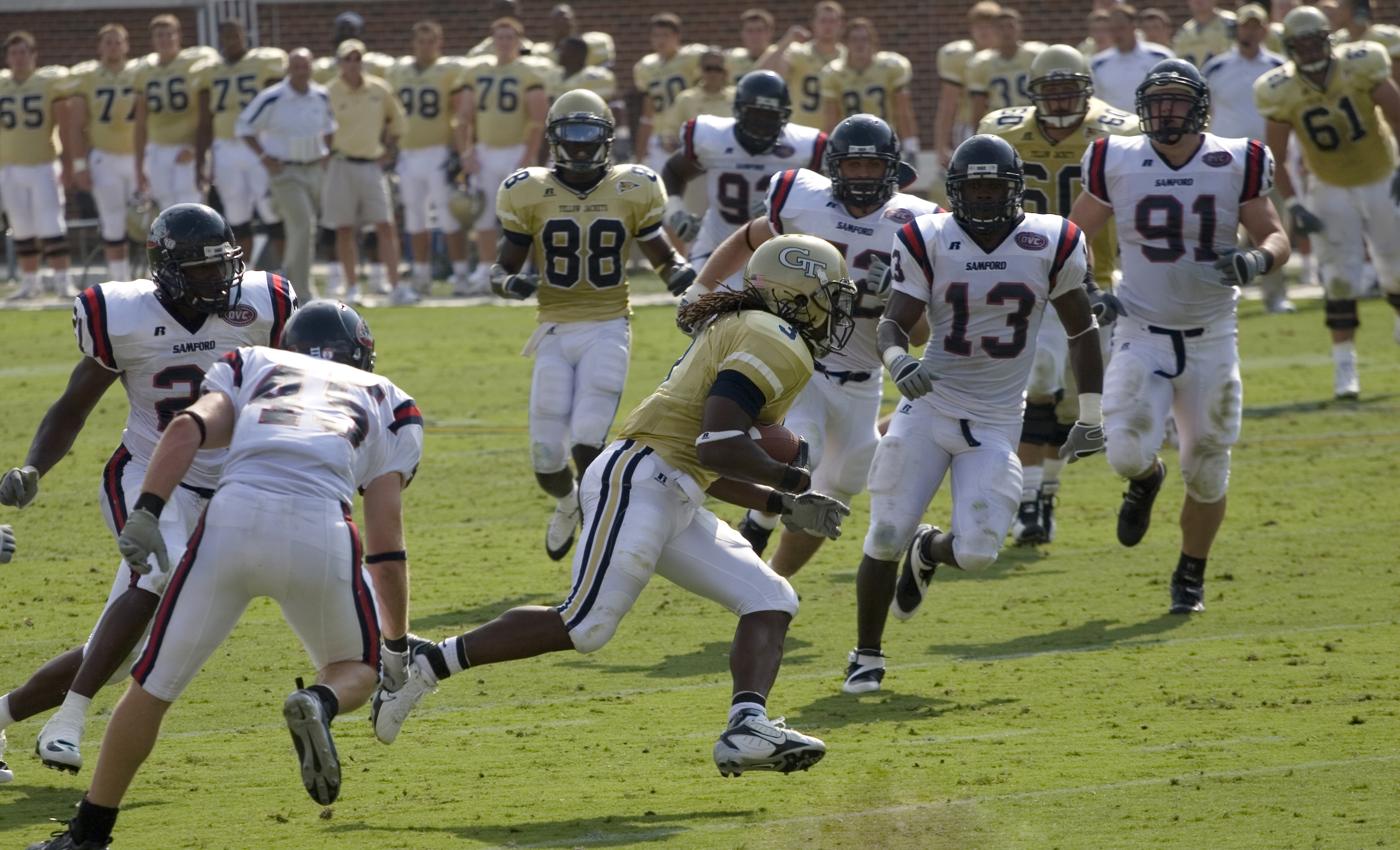
Rashaun Grant of Georgia Tech running the ball against Samford

	1	2	3	4	Total
Bulldogs	6	0	0	0	6
Yellow Jackets	14	21	3	0	38

Georgia Tech returned two interceptions for touchdowns for the first time since their 1966 victory over Tulane in what would turn out to be another great defensive performance. Samford only scored two field goals in the first quarter and Georgia Tech only allowed 12 yards rushing to the FCS (I-AA) school. 69 Georgia Tech players saw action in the game, including four different quarterbacks and four different tailbacks. The game was highlighted by Calvin Johnson's two touchdown catches, a Tashard Choice rushing touchdown, Reggie Ball's 92 all-purpose yards, and Djay Jones and Jamal Lewis' interception touchdowns. Djay's interception was 28 yards long and Jamal's interception was 98 yards long.

=== Troy ===
Uniform Combination
Helmet	Jersey	Pants

	1	2	3	4	Total
Trojans	0	7	7	6	20
Yellow Jackets	7	7	0	21	35

Georgia Tech needed two late interceptions from Gary Guyton and Jamal Lewis to help put down the Trojans. The game was tied 14–14 going into the fourth quarter before the Yellow Jackets got the go ahead touchdown on a play action pass to fullback Mike Cox. The next Trojan possession saw a tipped pass get intercepted by Guyton and Tech would drive down the field for a Tashard Choice rushing touchdown. Jamal Evans would score another rushing touchdown following a second GT pick by Lewis. The game was highlighted by Rashaun Grant's 53 yards and a touchdown on two end around plays, Tashard Choice's 73 yards rushing and a touchdown, Reggie Ball's single game GT QB rushing record of 138 yards, and James Johnson's 74 yards receiving with a touchdown.

=== Virginia ===
Uniform Combination
Helmet	Jersey	Pants

	1	2	3	4	Total
Cavaliers	0	0	0	7	7
Yellow Jackets	7	10	7	0	24

Georgia Tech ended its three-game losing streak to UVA with a dominating defensive effort and superb performances by Reggie Ball and Calvin Johnson. Reggie Ball is now 1–3 against the Wahoos and had 205 yards passing, 2 touchdown passes, and a rushing touchdown. Calvin Johnson set his personal longest touchdown reception record twice recording 58 and 66 yard touchdowns in a 165-yard effort. Tashard Choice, Rashaun Grant, and Jamaal Evans added 103 yards on 26 carries between them. Patrick Nix called three risky plays in the game. The first was a fullback pass from Mike Cox to Reggie Ball. The blocking back has never rushed for yardage but managed to complete a 17-yard pass to Ball. Rashaun Grant also received two reverse pitches from Tashard Choice, which netted only 7 yards. The defense held the Cavs to 166 yards of offense and forced three turnovers (two interceptions by Djay Jones and Jahi Word-Daniels and a fumble recovery by Jamal Lewis). The only Cavalier score was made possible by a fourth quarter fumble by Ball and Choice on a speed option. Also of note, Georgia Tech sported a white helmet and mustard uniform from the Bud Carson era (1969–1971).

=== Virginia Tech ===
Uniform Combination
Helmet	Jersey	Pants

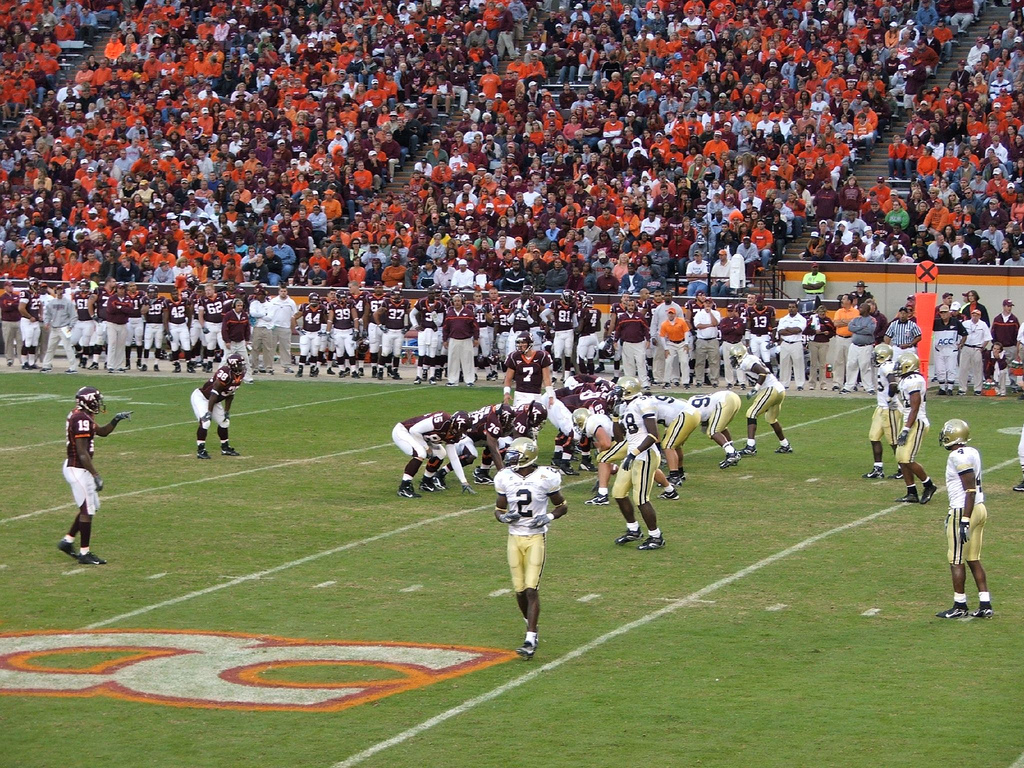
Georgia Tech playing the Hokies in Lane Stadium

	1	2	3	4	Total
Yellow Jackets	21	3	14	0	38
#10 Hokies	7	6	0	14	27

Georgia Tech opened with 21 straight points and never relented against the Hokies. The first play from the line of scrimmage was a 59-yard pass from Reggie Ball to James Johnson. Georgia Tech would block a punt to help set up their third touchdown. The defense also added points to the effort with a Philip Wheeler strip on Sean Glennon, which was recovered by Gary Guyton and returned for a touchdown. Calvin Johnson added 115 yards and 2 touchdowns, Tashard Choice accumulated 104 yards rushing and 2 touchdowns, and Reggie Ball added 211 yards of total offense to the victory.

=== Maryland ===
Uniform Combination
Helmet	Jersey	Pants

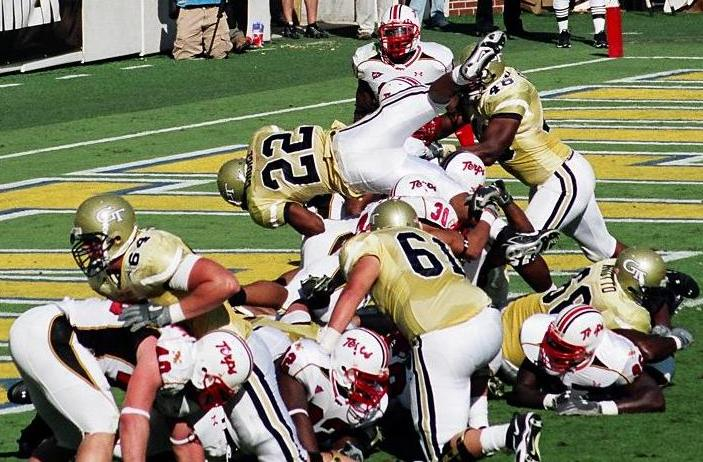
Tashard Choice scores his first TD on a 1-yard plunge.

	1	2	3	4	Total
Terrapins	10	10	3	0	23
#20 Yellow Jackets	7	7	0	13	27

Georgia Tech needed a 13-point fourth-quarter rally to rid Bobby Dodd Stadium of Terrapin red. Georgia Tech's first drive resulted in a touchdown but the celebration was short-lived as Maryland's cornerback Josh Wilson returned the ensuing kickoff for a 104-yard touchdown. Georgia Tech's placekicker Travis Bell faulted three times in the game, missing two field goals and throwing an incompletion to punter–holder Durant Brooks. The missed field goals allowed a stuttering Maryland offense to keep the game close. Maryland drove to the 7 yard line with 1:02 left in the game. QB Sam Hollenbach was sacked two times on 3rd and 4th down by end Michael Johnson in the last minute to seal the victory for Georgia Tech. The game featured a 133-yard and one-touchdown effort by Calvin Johnson, 245 yards of offense and two touchdowns from Reggie Ball, and most importantly a dominating effort by Tashard Choice of 137 yards rushing and 2 touchdowns. Georgia Tech's defense held Maryland to only 87 yards rushing, garnered 5 sacks, had 1 fumble recovery, and picked off 1 Hollenbach pass. Georgia Tech had not been 5–1 and 3–0 in conference since GT's co-ACC Championship in 1998. The game was also the 90th anniversary of the 222–0 victory over Cumberland College.

=== Clemson ===
Uniform Combination
Helmet	Jersey	Pants

	1	2	3	4	Total
#13 Yellow Jackets	0	0	0	7	7
#12 Tigers	0	7	10	14	31

Georgia Tech suffered its first conference loss to Clemson in Death Valley. C. J. Spiller and James Davis accounted for 92% of Clemson's offense in the loss. Georgia Tech's vaunted rush defense gave up over 300 yards on the ground after only allowing 81 yards a game coming into the contest. Calvin Johnson was held to no catches for the first time since his first game as a Yellow Jacket and only had −4 yards rushing on a speed option. Reggie Ball had 130 yards of offense and James Johnson had the Jackets only touchdown on an awkwardly deflected 35 yard pass. The Jackets forced two turnovers and had one sack. Djay Jones had the Ramblin' Wreck's pick and Philip Wheeler recovered a fumble after Tyler Grisham got drilled by Djay Jones. This game continued the Yellow Jackets' streak of losing in ESPN College GameDay events with an overall record of 0–4–1.

=== Miami (FL) ===
Uniform Combination
Helmet	Jersey	Pants

	1	2	3	4	Total
Hurricanes	10	3	3	7	23
#21 Yellow Jackets	3	10	0	17	30

Georgia Tech got off to a rocky start when a Reggie Ball fumble was returned for a touchdown on the first play from scrimmage. The two teams then exchanged field goals until Georgia Tech's offense kicked out of neutral. Reggie Ball connected on a Hamilton–Campbellesque 46 yard play action touchdown to James Johnson. Six field goals were kicked in the game by both squads, three by Travis Bell. Calvin Johnson had a 1-yard touchdown reception and 67 yards receiving. James Johnson had 69 yards receiving and his 46-yard touchdown bomb. Tashard Choice had 101 yards rushing and a 24-yard break away touchdown that put the game out of reach. Mike Cox had 2 receptions of 36 total yards, which resulted in punishing hits to Miami defenders. The Georgia Tech defense and special teams managed to force 4 turnovers and the defense sacked Kyle Wright 7 times (Pat Clark interception, Avery Roberson fumble recovery, Chris Dunlap fumble recovery, and KaMichael Hall fumble recovery). Durant Brooks pounded 6 punts at 51 yards per kick and his last punt sailed over the returner's head, was mishandled, and recovered by GT for the victory. Georgia Tech now has an 11-year winning streak in homecoming games.

=== NC State ===
Uniform Combination
Helmet	Jersey	Pants

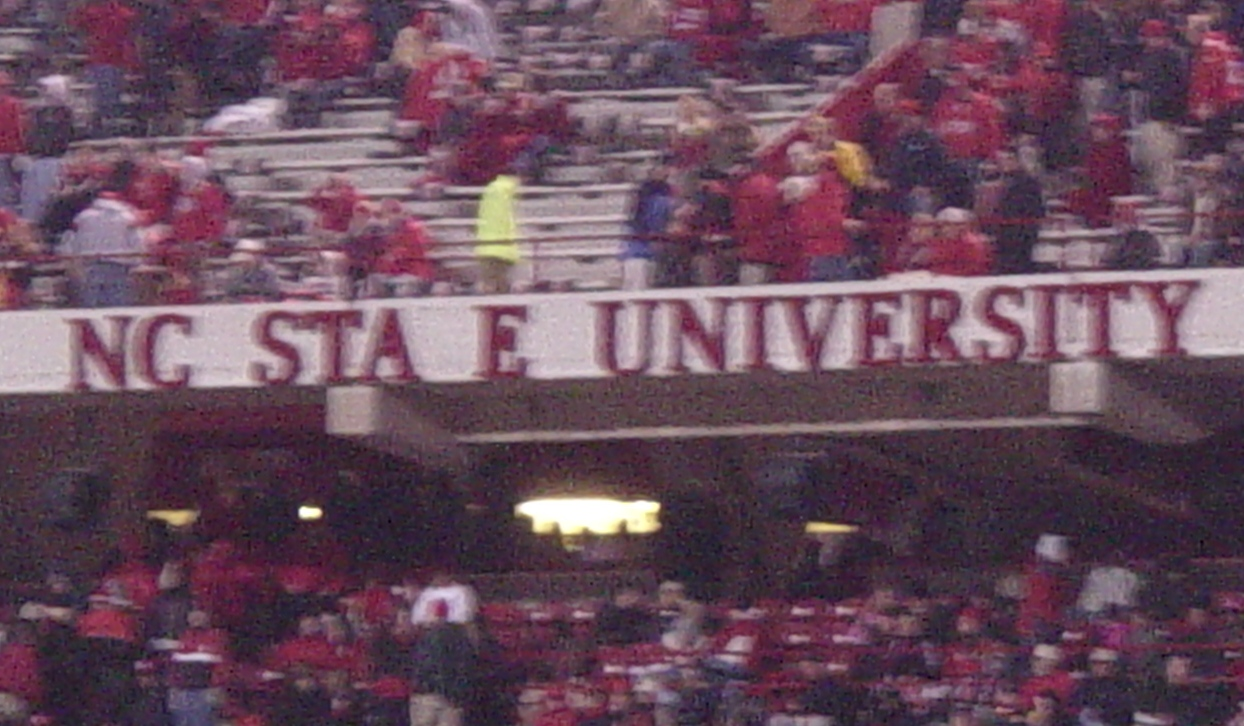
The T from NC State disappeared mid-game.

	1	2	3	4	Total
#20 Yellow Jackets	14	7	0	10	31
Wolfpack	3	10	10	0	23

The Georgia Tech defense shut NC State out of the end zone and continued Georgia Tech's dominance over Chuck Amato. The only NC State touchdowns were scored off of an interception return and kickoff return. NC State could not capitalize on field position and the second Georgia Tech interception turning all red zone attempts into field goal attempts. NC State also misfired on 2 of their 5 field goal attempts and committed 102 yards in penalties. Reggie Ball, James Johnson, and Calvin Johnson lit up the skies with over 215 passing yards and four touchdowns. Tashard Choice also contributed 165 yards on the ground behind a solid Georgia Tech offensive line effort. Georgia Tech has now outscored their last four opponents 47–21 in the fourth quarter of play.

=== North Carolina ===
Uniform Combination
Helmet	Jersey	Pants

	1	2	3	4	Total
#18 Yellow Jackets	0	7	0	0	7
Tar Heels	0	0	0	0	0

Georgia Tech shut out the Tar Heels in a game reminiscent of the 1990 tie that almost cost the Jackets the 1990 UPI title. The game marked the first shutout for Georgia Tech in six years and featured the longest drive of the year by an ACC team. The ten and half minute drive was the only score for the Jackets as Tashard Choice pushed his way into the end zone. Choice accumulated 119 yards on 32 carries. The defense added two picks by Jamal Lewis and Kenny Scott, which staved off any real Tarheel threats to score. The Tar Heels were held to only 65 yards rushing and gave up two sacks. Tech's offense had an 11-minute advantage in time of possession. Georgia Tech has now clinched the ACC Coastal division and will be playing in Jacksonville on December 2.

=== Duke ===
Uniform Combination
Helmet	Jersey	Pants

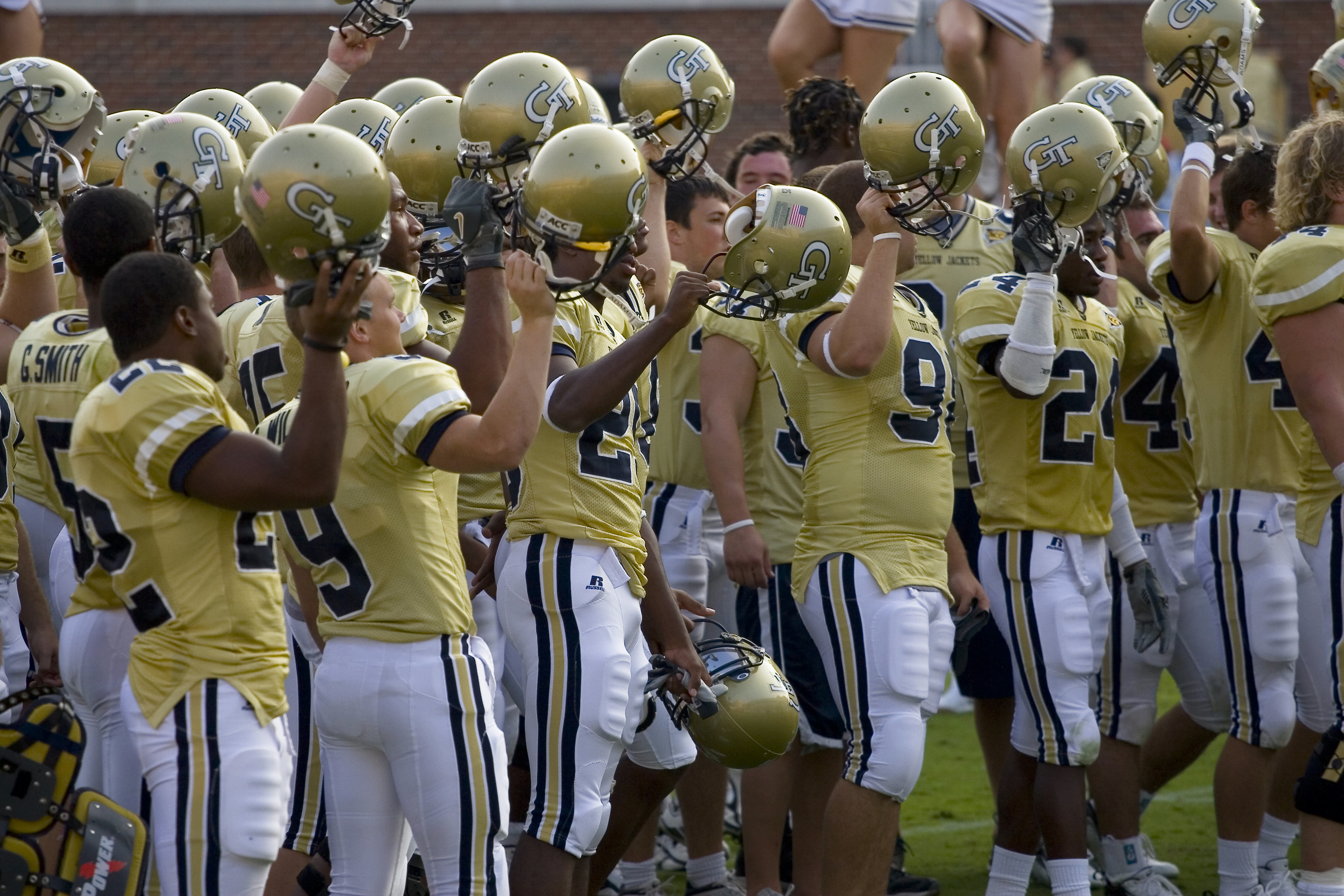
Tech celebrates after a win by singing the fight song with the student section.

	1	2	3	4	Total
Blue Devils	0	7	7	7	21
#18 Yellow Jackets	7	21	14	7	49

Tech finished its ACC schedule with an easy victory over mismatched Duke. The game was won on the legs of Tashard Choice and the big connections between Reggie Ball and Calvin Johnson. Choice ran for 118 yards and a score while Reggie connected with Calvin for 5 passes, 78 yards, and two touchdowns. Ball finished the day by the end of the second quarter with 7–13 passing for 122 yards and 3 touchdowns against the maligned Blue Devils. Taylor Bennett lead the second team in the third and fourth quarter adding another score on his second pass on a 20-yard dart to Greg Smith. Bennett and Smith connected later on another score of 25 yards. Third string back Jamaal Evans added another 90 rushing yards and a score. The defense added 4 sacks, 2 interceptions, and 2 fumble recoveries.

=== Georgia ===
Uniform Combination
Helmet	Jersey	Pants

	1	2	3	4	Total
#15 Yellow Jackets	0	3	3	6	12
Bulldogs	0	0	7	8	15

For the third straight year, the Tech-UGA game has been settled by a touchdown or less in a defensive brawl. The Jackets could not overcome three turnovers to end their losing streak to the Dogs and lost on a Matthew Stafford touchdown pass with 1:45 remaining in the fourth quarter. The true bright spots for Tech in the loss were the spectacular play of Tashard Choice, Durrant Brooks, Travis Bell, and the Tech Defense. The defense recorded two sacks and held the Bulldog offense to less than 100 yards rushing. The defense also recovered a fumble to help set up a Travis Bell field goal. Travis Bell was 2 for 2 on field goals. Durrant Brooks boomed 5 punts for a 44.6 yard average. 3 of the 5 punts landed within the 20. Tashard Choice continued his streak of 100 yard games with a 143-yard and 1 touchdown performance. Choice's touchdown lifted the Jackets to their final lead early in the fourth quarter but the lead would only last for 7 minutes. Georgia Tech's last possession saw Tech starting within their own 20 and needing a big play downfield. UGA's defensive line aided Tech with a personal foul on 4th down and 12, but Reggie Ball, who finished the game 6–22 for 42 yards with 0 TDs, 2 interceptions and a lost fumble, threw the ball right into the arms of Georgia cornerback Paul Oliver to seal the Bulldogs win.

=== ACC Championship Game ===
Uniform Combination
Helmet	Jersey	Pants

	1	2	3	4	Total
Yellow Jackets	3	0	0	3	6
Demon Deacons	0	3	0	6	9

On a day that featured heavy rain and a soggy field, conservative play-calling, the kicking games of Tech and Wake Forest, Wake prevailed by kicking a field goal with 2:55 left on the game clock to go ahead for good 9 to 6 after a long pass completion gave the Deacons good field position. Both teams punted a combined 12 times for almost 550 yards. There were 6 field goal attempts made, the only miss coming from Wake's backup field goal kicker. The Tech defense recorded 4 sacks and held the Demon Deacons under 100 yards rushing. Tashard Choice recorded 99 yards rushing, Calvin recorded 117 yards receiving, and Reggie Ball recorded 170 all-purpose yards. Also of note, Georgia Tech sported navy blue jerseys for the game, a style not worn since Bill Lewis' 1994 season.

=== Gator Bowl ===
Uniform Combination
Helmet	Jersey	Pants

	1	2	3	4	Total
Mountaineers	7	10	21	0	38
Yellow Jackets	14	14	7	0	35

Georgia Tech opened the game with fireworks taking as much as an 18-point lead at the start of the 3rd quarter. However, WVU rallied to the tune of 21 3rd quarter points and beat the Jackets by 3 in the highest scoring Gator Bowl in the 61 years of its operation. Taylor Bennett started for Georgia Tech as Reggie Ball was, shockingly, found academically ineligible at the completion of the Fall semester. Taylor had a career-high 335 yards and 3 touchdowns. His lone pick was one of the few mistakes Taylor made in his 2007 coming out party. Tashard Choice dominated against a supposedly stingy WVU run defense racking up 169 yards on 27 carries along with 2 touchdowns, yet, unsurprisingly, couldn't bring the Jackets to victory. Choice also accumulated 36 yards receiving. Calvin Johnson highlighted Georgia Tech's offensive efforts with 9 catches, 186 yards receiving, and 2 touchdowns. The defense recorded 1 sack and Durrant Brooks boomed 4 punts for a 46.3 yard average.

== Postseason awards ==
American Football Coaches' Association All-America Team
First Team	Second Team
Calvin Johnson, WR	Philip Wheeler, LB
Walter Camp All-America Team
Calvin Johnson, WR
Fred Biletnikoff Award
Calvin Johnson, WR
Atlantic Coast Conference Player of the Year
Calvin Johnson, WR
Associated Press All-ACC Team
First Team	Second Team
Joe Anoa'i, DT; Durant Brooks, P; Calvin Johnson, WR; Jamal Lewis, S	Tashard Choice, RB; Adamm Oliver, DE; Philip Wheeler, LB

== Personnel ==
=== Coaching staff ===
- Chan Gailey – head coach
- Joe D'Alessandris – offensive line
- Buddy Geis – assistant head coach, wide receivers
- Jeep Hunter – tight ends
- Brian Jean-Mary – linebackers
- Charles Kelly – special teams coordinator
- Curtis Modkins – running backs
- Patrick Nix – offensive coordinator, quarterbacks
- Giff Smith – defensive line, recruiting coordinator
- Jon Tenuta – assistant head coach, defensive coordinator

=== Roster ===
(as of July 26, 2006)
Wide receivers: 5 Greg Smith – RS Freshman; 8 Demaryius Thomas – Freshman; 9 Eric Oetter – RS Freshman; 10 Martin Frierson – RS Freshman; 15 Correy Earls – Freshman; 21 Calvin Johnson – Junior; 81 Xavier McGuire – RS Senior; 83 Andrew Smith – RS Sophomore; 83 Tyler Davis – RS Sophomore; 88 Chris Dunlap – Senior; 89 James Johnson – RS Sophomore; Offensive line: 60 Kevin Tuminello – RS Junior; 61 Matt Rhodes – RS Junior; 62 Jacob Lonowski – RS Sophomore; 64 Andrew Gardner – RS Sophomore; 66 Will Miller – RS Freshman; 67 Travis Kelly – RS Senior; 71 Cord Howard – RS Freshman; 74 Trey Dunmon – RS Freshman; 75 Jason Hill – RS Freshman; 77 Dan Voss – RS Freshman; 78 LeShawn Newberry – RS Junior; Tight ends: 48 Michael Matthews – RS Senior; 80 George Cooper – RS Senior; 82 Kyle Mooneyham – RS Freshman; 84 Colin Peek – Sophomore; 85 Austin Barrick – Freshman; 86 Wayne Riles – RS Junior	Quarterbacks: 1 Reggie Ball – Senior; 11 Kyle Manley – RS Sophomore; 13 Taylor Bennett – RS Sophomore; 14 Byron Ingram – Freshman; 18 Jonathan Garner – RS Freshman; Running backs: 3 Rashaun Grant – RS Junior; 20 Jamaal Evans – Freshman; 22 Tashard Choice – RS Junior; 27 Loyall Gause – RS Sophomore; 32 Jason Davis – RS Freshman; 38 Quincy Kelly – Freshman; Fullbacks: 40 Mike Cox – Junior; 46 Matt Kamp – RS Freshman; 49 Trevor Bray – Freshman; Defensive line: 42 Adamm Oliver – RS Junior; 55 David Brown – RS Sophomore; 63 Marcus Harris – RS Junior; 65 Andrew Folkner – RS Sophomore; 68 Carl Pendleton – Junior; 69 Alex Paquette – RS Freshman; 90 Darell Robertson – Junior; 91 Brad Sellers – RS Freshman; 92 Travis Rogers – Sophomore; 93 Michael Johnson – Sophomore; 94 Elris Anyaibe – RS Sophomore; 95 Darryl Richard – RS Sophomore; 96 Joe Anoa'i – Senior; 97 Rober Hall – Freshman; 98 Ben Anderson – Freshman; 99 Vance Walker – Sophomore	Linebackers: 12 Anthony Barnes – Freshman; 17 Matt Braman – Sophomore; 30 James Liipfert – RS Sophomore; 35 KaMichael Hall – Senior; 41 Philip Wheeler – RS Junior; 44 Taalib Tucker – Sophomore; 50 Carter Scurry – RS Freshman; 52 Travis Chambers – Junior; 54 Sedric Griffin – Freshman; 56 Osahon Tongo – Freshman; 57 Shane Bowen – Freshman; 58 Gary Guyton – Junior; 59 David Sanborn – RS Junior; Defensive backs: 2 Kenny Scott – Senior; 4 Jamal Lewis – Junior; 6 Pat Clark – Junior; 7 Tony Clark – Sophomore; 23 Djay Jones – Junior; 24 Laurence Marius – Freshman; 25 DeRon Jasper – Freshman; 26 Dominique Reese – Freshman; 29 Sam Williams – Senior; 32 Jahi Word-Daniels – Sophomore; 34 Avery Roberson – RS Junior; 36 Jason Palmer – RS Sophomore; 37 Joe Gaston – Senior; 45 Tyler Barrett – RS Sophomore; 47 Jake Blackwood – RS Freshman; Long snappers: 50 Brett White – RS Sophomore; 51 Zach Ware – RS Freshman; Punters: 39 Durant Brooks – RS Junior; Kickers: 12 Troy Garside – RS Sophomore; 12 Tyler Jones – RS Sophomore; 28 Brian James – RS Freshman; 31 Mohamed Yahiaoui – Sophomore; 87 Travis Bell – RS Junior
