= 2007 Gator Bowl =

2007 Toyota Gator Bowl
- 62nd Gator Bowl
| Georgia Tech Yellow Jackets | West Virginia Mountaineers |
| (9–4) | (10–2) |
| ACC | Big East |
| 35 | 38 |
| Head coach: Chan Gailey | Head coach: Rich Rodriguez |
| Coaches 25 | AP / Coaches / BCS; 13 / 12 / 13 |
| | 1 | 2 | 3 | 4 | Total |
|---|---|---|---|---|---|
| Georgia Tech | 14 | 14 | 7 | 0 | 35 |
| West Virginia | 7 | 10 | 21 | 0 | 38 |
- Date: January 1, 2007
- Season: 2006
- Stadium: Jacksonville Municipal Stadium
- Location: Jacksonville, Florida
- MVP: Pat White (QB, West Virginia); Calvin Johnson (WR, Georgia Tech)
- Referee: Karl Richins (Mtn. West)
- Attendance: 67,947

United States TV coverage
- Network: CBS
- Announcers: Verne Lundquist and Gary Danielson

The 2007 Gator Bowl was a post-season college football bowl game between the Georgia Tech Yellow Jackets and the West Virginia Mountaineers played on January 1, 2007, at Jacksonville Municipal Stadium in Jacksonville, Florida. For sponsorship reasons, the bowl was officially known as the Toyota Gator Bowl. Down by 18 in the third quarter, West Virginia scored 21 unanswered points to win, 38–35.

The game matched Georgia Tech from the Atlantic Coast Conference against West Virginia from the Big East Conference. West Virginia entered the game ranked No. 13 in the AP Poll; it was West Virginia's third appearance in the Gator Bowl in the last four years and sixth overall. Georgia Tech accepted a bid to the Gator Bowl after losing the ACC championship to Wake Forest. It was Georgia Tech's first appearance in the Gator Bowl since 2000 and seventh overall.
