= 2004 Champs Sports Bowl =

American college football game

Syracuse Orange	Georgia Tech Yellow Jackets
(6–5)	(6–5)
Big East	ACC
14	51
Head coach: Paul Pasqualoni	Head coach: Chan Gailey
	1	2	3	4	Total
Syracuse	6	0	0	8	14
Georgia Tech	21	14	14	2	51
- Date: December 21, 2004
- Season: 2004
- Stadium: Florida Citrus Bowl
- Location: Orlando, Florida
- MVP: QB Reggie Ball (Georgia Tech)
- Referee: Randy Smith (C-USA)
- Attendance: 28,237

United States TV coverage
- Network: ESPN
- Announcers: Mike Tirico (Play-by-Play); Lee Corso (Analyst); Kirk Herbstreit (Analyst); Jill Arrington (Sidelines)

The 2004 Champs Sports Bowl was the 15th edition of the college football bowl game and was played on December 21, 2004, featuring the Georgia Tech Yellow Jackets, and the Syracuse Orange. This was the first version of the bowl played under the Champs Sports moniker and 15th overall. Syracuse of the Big East was chosen because the Big 12 did not have enough bowl eligible teams.

== Game summary ==
Georgia Tech started the scoring with a 22-yard interception return for a touchdown, on the second play of scrimmage, giving Georgia Tech the early 7–0 lead. Syracuse quarterback Perry Patterson scored on a 21-yard touchdown run cutting the lead to 7–6. Tech answered with a 10-yard touchdown pass from Reggie Ball to wide receiver Calvin Johnson, increasing Tech's lead to 14–6. Still in the first quarter, Reggie Ball threw an 80-yard touchdown pass to Nate Curry increasing the lead to 21–6.

In the second quarter PJ Daniels scored on a 5-yard touchdown run, increasing the lead to 28–6. Later in the quarter, Calvin Johnson scored on a 5 yard wide receiver reverse, increasing the lead to 35–6. That was the half-time score.

In the third quarter, Reggie Ball rushed for an 11-yard touchdown to increase the lead to 42–6. PJ Daniels 1-yard touchdown run increased the lead to 49–6. Perry Patterson found Steve Gregory for a 25-yard touchdown pass. The 2-point conversion was successful making the score 49–14. A Georgia Tech safety made the final margin 51–14.

== Aftermath ==
Syracuse did not reach another bowl game again until 2010. Georgia Tech reached five more in that time span, though they lost all of them. They did not win a bowl game again until 2012. Syracuse announced in 2011 that they would join Georgia Tech in the Atlantic Coast Conference, no earlier than 2014. They joined the Atlantic Coast Conference in 2013.
