= 2007 Humanitarian Bowl =

2007 Roady's Humanitarian Bowl
- Humanitarian Bowl logo.
| Georgia Tech Yellow Jackets | Fresno State Bulldogs |
| (7–5) | (8–4) |
| ACC | WAC |
| 28 | 40 |
| Head coach: Jon Tenuta (interim) | Head coach: Pat Hill |
| | 1 | 2 | 3 | 4 | Total |
|---|---|---|---|---|---|
| Georgia Tech | 7 | 0 | 14 | 7 | 28 |
| Fresno State | 3 | 17 | 14 | 6 | 40 |
- Date: December 31, 2007
- Season: 2007
- Stadium: Bronco Stadium
- Location: Boise, Idaho
- MVP: QB Tom Brandstater, Fresno State
- Favorite: Georgia Tech by 6
- Referee: Randy Smith (Big East)
- Attendance: 27,062
- Payout: US$750,000 per team

United States TV coverage
- Network: ESPN2
- Announcers: Dave LaMont, James Hasty, and Heather Cox

The 2007 Roady's Humanitarian Bowl, part of the 2007-08 NCAA football bowl games season, was played on December 31, 2007, at Bronco Stadium on the campus of Boise State University in Boise, Idaho.

Once again, the invited teams were from the Atlantic Coast Conference (Georgia Tech) and Western Athletic Conference (Fresno State).

The Yellow Jackets were in a transition period between previous head coach Chan Gailey, fired in late November, and new head coach Paul Johnson, hired on December 7. Jon Tenuta, the team's defensive coordinator, coached the "Ramblin' Wreck" in this game.
