= Jon Tenuta =

American football player and coach (born 1957)

Biographical details
- Born: February 25, 1957 (age 69); Columbus, Ohio, U.S.

Playing career
- 1978–1981: Virginia
- Position: Defensive back

Coaching career (HC unless noted)
- 1981–1982: Virginia (GA)
- 1983: Maryland (GA)
- 1984–1985: Vanderbilt (DB)
- 1986: Marshall (DB)
- 1987: Marshall (DC/DB)
- 1988: Kansas State (DC/DL)
- 1989: SMU (DB)
- 1990: SMU (DC/LB)
- 1991–1994: SMU (DC)
- 1995: Oklahoma (DB)
- 1996–1999: Ohio State (DB)
- 2000: Ohio State (DC/DB)
- 2001: North Carolina (DC/DB)
- 2002–2007: Georgia Tech (DC/DB)
- 2007: Georgia Tech (interim HC)
- 2008: Notre Dame (AHC/LB)
- 2009: Notre Dame (AHC/DC/LB)
- 2010–2011: NC State (LB)
- 2012: NC State (AHC/LB)
- 2013–2014: Virginia (AHC/DC/LB)
- 2015: Virginia (AHC/DC/S)
- 2017–2019: Cincinnati (S)
- 2020: Cincinnati (DA)
- 2021: Virginia Tech (DA)
- 2022–2023: New Orleans Breakers (DC/DB)

Head coaching record
- Overall: 0–1
- Bowls: 0–1

Jon Tenuta (born February 25, 1957) is an American football coach who was most recently the defensive coordinator and secondaries coach for the New Orleans Breakers of the United States Football League (USFL). Previously, Tenuta was the defensive coordinator for the Virginia Cavaliers.

== Education ==
He attended Upper Arlington High School in Columbus, Ohio. In his senior season, Upper Arlington played in the state championship game and lost to Warren Harding. He finished his college playing career at the University of Virginia. Tenuta's High School nickname was "Punchy," after the Hawaiian Punch character.

== Coaching career ==
Tenuta was the former associate head coach and defensive coordinator of the Georgia Tech Yellow Jackets. In the wake of the November 26, 2007 firing of Georgia Tech head coach Chan Gailey, Tenuta was named Interim Head Coach, but was not retained by incoming head coach Paul Johnson. He also coached the Yellow Jackets' defensive backs and was one of the highest paid coordinators in college football.

On January 31, 2008, Tenuta was named assistant head coach/defense at the University of Notre Dame succeeding Bill Lewis. Tenuta coached the linebackers and ran the defense for three seasons with the Irish. He was hired by Charlie Weis after having worked at Georgia Tech since 2002. Tenuta's position at Notre Dame ended following the firing of Weis after the 2009 season ended. Incoming Head Coach Brian Kelly chose not to retain Tenuta and replaced him with his then–Cincinnati defensive coordinator Bob Diaco.

On January 3, 2012, it was announced that Tenuta was hired as assistant coach at the University of Illinois at Urbana–Champaign by new head coach Tim Beckman, however Tenuta announced on January 4, 2012, that he would remain at North Carolina State University.

On January 3, 2013, it was announced that Tenuta and former NC State head coach Tom O'Brien would be joining the coaching staff at Tenuta's alma mater, the University of Virginia. Tenuta served as the defensive coordinator for the Cavaliers until 2015.

January 11, 2017, he was named safeties coach for University of Cincinnati under head coach Luke Fickell.

== Head coaching record ==
Year	Team	Overall	Conference	Standing	Bowl/playoffs	Coaches^{#}	AP^{°}
Georgia Tech Yellow Jackets (Atlantic Coast Conference) (2007)
2007	Georgia Tech	0–1 (Note: Tenuta served as interim head coach for the Humanitarian Bowl after the firing of Chan Gailey following the conclusion of the regular season.)	0–0		L Humanitarian Bowl		
Georgia Tech:		0–1	0–0				
Total:		0–1					
^{#}Rankings from final Coaches Poll.; ^{°}Rankings from final AP Poll.
