= Chan Gailey =

American football coach (born 1952)

Personal information
- Born: January 5, 1952 (age 74); Gainesville, Georgia, U.S.

Career information
- High school: Americus (Americus, Georgia)
- College: Florida

Career history
- Florida (1974–1975) Graduate assistant; Troy State (1976–1978) Defensive backs coach; Air Force (1979–1982); Defensive backs coach (1979–1980); Defensive coordinator (1981–1982); Troy State (1983–1984) Head coach; Denver Broncos (1985–1990); Tight ends & special teams coach (1985–1986); Wide receivers & tight ends coach (1987); Quarterbacks coach (1988); Offensive coordinator & wide receivers coach (1989–1990); Birmingham Fire (1991–1992) Head coach; Samford (1993) Head coach; Pittsburgh Steelers (1994–1997); Wide receivers coach (1994–1995); Offensive coordinator (1996–1997); Dallas Cowboys (1998–1999) Head coach; Miami Dolphins (2000–2001) Offensive coordinator; Georgia Tech (2002–2007) Head coach; Kansas City Chiefs (2008) Offensive coordinator; Buffalo Bills (2010–2012) Head coach; New York Jets (2015–2016) Offensive coordinator; Miami Dolphins (2020) Offensive coordinator

Awards and highlights
- Division II national champion (1984); Gulf South champion (1984); Gulf South Coach of The Year (1984); Troy University Sports Hall of Fame (2013); Alabama Sports Hall of Fame (2018)

Head coaching record
- Regular season: NFL: 34–46 (.425)
- Postseason: NFL: 0–2 (.000)
- Career: NFL: 34–48 (.415); NCAA: 68–41 (.624); WLAF: 12–7 (.632)
- Coaching profile at Pro Football Reference

Thomas Chandler Gailey Jr. (born January 5, 1952) is an American former football coach. Most recently in 2020, he was the offensive coordinator for the Miami Dolphins of the National Football League (NFL). Gailey has previously served as the head coach of the Dallas Cowboys, Georgia Tech Yellow Jackets, and Buffalo Bills from 1998 to 2012.

In a coaching career spanning 46 years, Gailey began his NFL career as part of Dan Reeves' coaching staff on the Denver Broncos from 1985 to 1990, appearing in Super Bowls XXI, XXII, and XXIV with the Broncos. Gailey was on the Pittsburgh Steelers staff from 1994 to 1997 when the Steelers won four straight AFC Central titles and coached in one Super Bowl (XXX). He held his first professional head coach position in 1998, when he became the new head coach of the Dallas Cowboys, and led the Cowboys to playoff appearances in each of his 2 seasons in Dallas. Gailey served as offensive coordinator for the Miami Dolphins in 2000 and 2001, when the Dolphins posted consecutive 11–5 records, and was part of the 2000 Dolphins squad which was the last time the team had won a playoff game. Gailey served as the offensive coordinator for the Kansas City Chiefs in 2008 and three games of the 2009 preseason. In 2010, he was hired as the new head coach of the Buffalo Bills, where he coached until 2012. Three years after his firing from the Bills, he served as the offensive coordinator for the New York Jets from 2015 to 2016. In 2020, Gailey came out of retirement to again serve as the offensive coordinator for the Miami Dolphins, where he would last for only a season before resigning on January 6, 2021.

== Early life and education ==
Gailey was born in Gainesville, Georgia, in 1952. He attended Americus High School in Americus, Georgia, where he earned Eagle Scout honors, and a letterman in high school football, basketball, baseball, and golf. In football, he was an all-state selection as quarterback. Gailey graduated from Americus High School in 1970.

Gailey attended the University of Florida in Gainesville, Florida, where he was a three-year letterman for coach Doug Dickey's Florida Gators football team as a quarterback from 1971 to 1973. Gailey graduated from Florida with a bachelor's degree in physical education in 1974.

== Coaching career ==
=== Troy, Air Force, and back to Troy ===
Gailey stayed with Florida as a graduate assistant for two years before taking his first actual coaching job as the secondary coach for the Troy Trojans of Troy University (then known as Troy State University) in Troy, Alabama. After two seasons there, he spent four seasons with the U.S. Air Force Academy, including two as defensive coordinator under head coach Ken Hatfield.

In 1983, Gailey made his way back to Troy, taking over the head coaching duties at Troy University. In his first season as head coach, he led the Trojans to a 7–4 overall record. In his second season at the helm in 1984, he led his #3-ranked Trojans to a 12–1 record en route to the NCAA Division II national championship, defeating #1-ranked North Dakota State, 18–17 to win the title.

=== Professional leagues (1984–1992, 1994–2001) ===
Gailey moved to the NFL the next year, when the Denver Broncos signed him as an offensive assistant and special teams coach. The team made three Super Bowl appearances during his six-year tenure and coached quarterbacks John Elway and Gary Kubiak during his lone year as quarterbacks coach in 1988. In 1991, Gailey left the NFL to become the head coach of the Birmingham Fire of the World League of American Football, where the team made the playoffs in both years that he was coach.

After a one-year stint as head coach at Samford University, he returned to the NFL with the Pittsburgh Steelers. After starting off as coach for the wide receivers, then moved up to offensive coordinator for the 1996 and 1997 NFL seasons. The Steelers won their division all four years, and made one Super Bowl appearance.

On February 13, 1998, Gailey was hired to take over a struggling Dallas Cowboys squad (as operated by Jerry Jones), one that had faltered under Barry Switzer during his last season. Other candidates considered in the course of five weeks were George Seifert, Sherman Lewis, and Terry Donahue, with the latter being the closest to being hired before disagreeing with Jones about contract language that opened the door for Gailey. Notably in the leadup to the season, Gailey expressed his opinion to the Cowboys to not draft Randy Moss in the 1998 NFL draft due to perceived off-field issues. Gailey's Cowboys won the NFC East in 1998, winning all eight games against teams in their division. This would come back to haunt them when they played the Arizona Cardinals, who happened to squeak into the playoffs as a Wild Card team despite losing to their division rival twice. Arizona trounced Dallas 20-7 for not only the first home playoff loss for the Cowboys in six years but also their first playoff win in a half-century. The Cowboys, hindered by injuries to players such as Michael Irvin (who suffered a career-ending injury midway through the year) went 8–8 in 1999 after starting the season 3–0, losing seven of eight games decided by a touchdown. They made the playoffs but lost to Minnesota. He was fired on January 12, 2000, three days after the season ended for Dallas with three years remaining on his contract. Gailey is the only Cowboys coach to have never missed the playoffs with his team. Gailey is also sometimes referred to by fans as "the forgotten coach" of Dallas. Jones later stated his regret at firing Gailey after two seasons.

Gailey returned to the offensive coordinator role, this time with the Miami Dolphins for the 2000 and 2001 seasons.

=== Georgia Tech (2002–2007) ===
Gailey was hired by the Yellow Jackets in 2002 to replace George O'Leary, who left to become head coach at the University of Notre Dame (O'Leary infamously resigned at Notre Dame after only 5 days). In his first five years at Georgia Tech, he had compiled a 37–27 record. Georgia Tech went to bowl games each year under Gailey, and won two: the 2003 Humanitarian Bowl (a 52–10 win over the University of Tulsa), and the 2004 Champs Sports Bowl (a 51–14 victory over Syracuse University). Gailey compiled six winning seasons in six years at the helm. However, he never defeated Tech's biggest rival, the University of Georgia, never won the ACC, never went to a BCS bowl, never won more than nine games, and never finished in the top 25. The 2006 season was his most successful at Georgia Tech, winning the ACC Coastal Division, but losing his last three games to rival UGA, Wake Forest in the ACC Championship Game, and West Virginia in the Gator Bowl.

Gailey's name was mentioned for both the Pittsburgh Steelers and Miami Dolphins head-coaching jobs following the 2006 season, two teams for which he was offensive coordinator. Gailey got neither job. On January 19, 2007, Gailey announced he would return to Georgia Tech.

After a 7–5 2007 regular season and losing to the Georgia Bulldogs football team for the sixth straight year, it was announced on November 26, 2007, that Gailey had been dismissed and his $1 million/year contract bought out.

=== Kansas City Chiefs (2008) ===
Gailey was hired on January 16, 2008, to become the offensive coordinator of the Kansas City Chiefs. He inherited a Chiefs offense that ranked at the bottom of the league in almost every category the previous season. Under his coaching, the Chiefs finished with the 24th-ranked offense in the league. He was demoted after three pre-season games in 2009 and relieved of play-calling duties by head coach Todd Haley. He spent the 2009 season out of football.

=== Buffalo Bills (2010–2012) ===
Gailey was introduced as the 15th head coach of the Buffalo Bills on January 19, 2010, replacing interim head coach Perry Fewell and becoming their fifth head coach in 10 years. The Bills went 4–12 in his first season, with the 25th-ranked offense and 24th-ranked defense in the league. The following year, Buffalo ranked 14th in offense and 26th in defense as the Bills improved slightly to finish with a 6–10 record despite starting the season with a 5–2 record. In 2012, the Bills finished 19th in offense and 22nd in defense as they once again finished 6–10.

On December 31, 2012, Gailey was relieved of his duties as the Bills' head coach. He amassed a career 16–32 record in Buffalo.

=== New York Jets (2015–2016) ===
Gailey was named offensive coordinator by the New York Jets on January 20, 2015, under new head coach Todd Bowles. He was reunited with former Bills quarterback Ryan Fitzpatrick.

In his first season, the Jets finished with the 10th-ranked offense in the league. They finished 13th in the league in passing and 10th in rushing. Through Week 14 of the 2016 season, the Jets had the 24th-ranked offense in the league. Following the 2016 season in which the Jets ranked near the bottom of the league in offense and finished 5–11, Gailey retired on January 3, 2017.

=== Return to the Miami Dolphins ===
On January 20, 2020, Gailey was hired by the Miami Dolphins as their offensive coordinator under head coach Brian Flores, also Gailey's first time in Miami in 19 years. Gailey was again reunited with former Bills and Jets quarterback Ryan Fitzpatrick, whom Gailey served as head coach of the Bills from 2010 to 2012, and as offensive coordinator for the Jets from 2015 to 2016. On January 6, 2021, Gailey resigned from the offensive coordinator position.

== Head coaching record ==
=== College ===
Year	Team	Overall	Conference	Standing	Bowl/playoffs
Troy State Trojans (Gulf South Conference) (1983–1984)
1983	Troy State	7–4	4–3	T–2nd	
1984	Troy State	12–1	6–1	1st	W NCAA Division II Championship
Troy State:		19–5	10–4		
Samford Bulldogs (NCAA Division I-AA independent) (1993)
1993	Samford	5–6			
Samford:		5–6			
Georgia Tech Yellow Jackets (Atlantic Coast Conference) (2002–2007)
2002	Georgia Tech	7–6	4–4	T–5th	L Silicon Valley
2003	Georgia Tech	7–6	4–4	T–4th	W Humanitarian
2004	Georgia Tech	7–5	4–4	T–6th	W Champs Sports
2005	Georgia Tech	7–5	5–3	3rd (Coastal)	L Emerald
2006	Georgia Tech	9–5	7–1	1st (Coastal)	L Gator
2007	Georgia Tech	7–5	4–4	3rd (Coastal)	Humanitarian
Georgia Tech:		44–32	28–20		
Total:		68–43			
National championship Conference title Conference division title or championship game berth

=== National Football League ===
Team	Year	Regular season					Postseason			
Team	Year	Won	Lost	Ties	Win %	Finish	Won	Lost	Win %	Result
DAL	1998	10	6	0	.625	1st in NFC East	0	1	.000	Lost to Arizona Cardinals in NFC Wild Card Game
DAL	1999	8	8	0	.500	2nd in NFC East	0	1	.000	Lost to Minnesota Vikings in NFC Wild Card Game
DAL total		18	14	0	.563		0	2	.000	
BUF	2010	4	12	0	.250	4th in AFC East	–	–	–	–
BUF	2011	6	10	0	.375	4th in AFC East	–	–	–	–
BUF	2012	6	10	0	.375	4th in AFC East	–	–	–	–
BUF total		16	32	0	.333		0	0	.000	
Total		34	46	0	.425		0	2	.000	

=== World League of American Football ===
Record with Birmingham Fire

Season records
Season	W	L	T	Finish	Playoff results
1991	5	5	0	1st North American West	Lost Semifinals (Dragons)
1992	7	2	1	2nd North American West	Lost Semifinals (Thunder)
Totals	12	7	1	(excluding playoffs)	

== See also ==
- List of Florida Gators in the NFL draft
- List of University of Florida alumni
