= Georgia Tech Yellow Jackets football =

College Football Bowl Subdivision team; member of Atlantic Coast Conference

2026 Georgia Tech Yellow Jackets football team
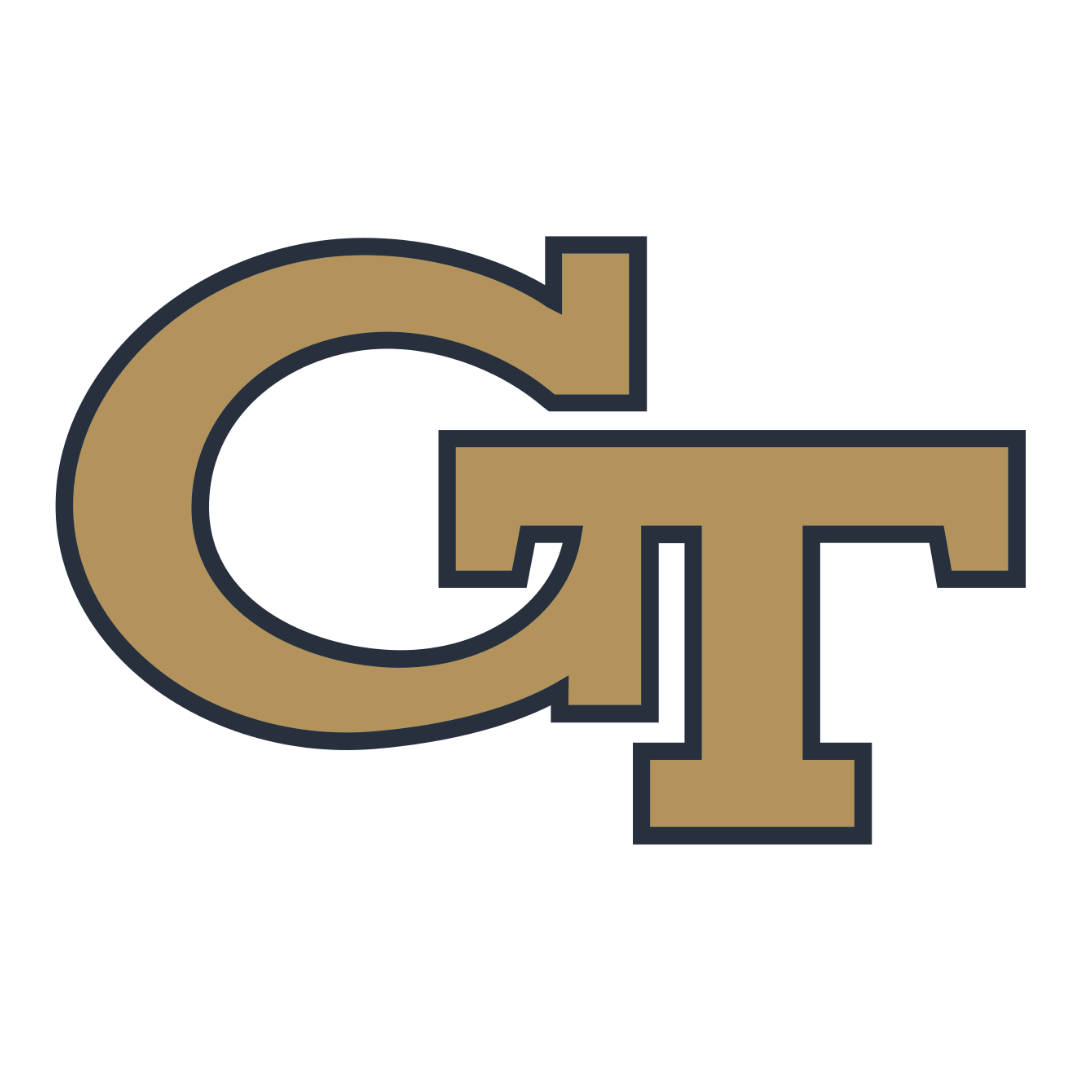
- First season: 1892; 134 years ago
- Athletic director: Ryan Alpert
- Head coach: Brent Key; 5th season, 30–28 (.517)
- Location: Atlanta, Georgia
- Stadium: Bobby Dodd Stadium (capacity: 52,113)
- Conference: ACC
- Colors: Gold and white
- All-time record: 774–550–43 (.582)
- Bowl record: 26–22–0 (.542)

National championships
- Claimed: 1917, 1928, 1952, 1990
- Unclaimed: 1916, 1951, 1956

Conference championships
- SIAA: 1916, 1917, 1918, 1920, 1921 SoCon: 1922, 1927, 1928 SEC: 1939, 1943, 1944, 1951, 1952 ACC: 1990, 1998, 2009

Division championships
- ACC Coastal: 2006, 2008, 2009, 2012, 2014
- Consensus All-Americans: 21
- Rivalries: Alabama (rivalry; dormant); Auburn (rivalry; dormant); Clemson (rivalry); Duke (rivalry); Georgia (rivalry); Tennessee (rivalry); Vanderbilt (rivalry; dormant); Virginia Tech (rivalry)
- Fight song: "Ramblin' Wreck from Georgia Tech" and "Up With the White and Gold"
- Mascot: Buzz, The Ramblin' Wreck
- Marching band: Georgia Tech Yellow Jacket Marching Band
- Outfitter: Under Armour
- Website: ramblinwreck.com

The Georgia Tech Yellow Jackets football program represents the Georgia Institute of Technology in American football. The team competes in the Atlantic Coast Conference (ACC) of the Football Bowl Subdivision (FBS) level of the NCAA. Georgia Tech has fielded a team since 1892 and holds an all-time record of 773–550–43. The Yellow Jackets play at the historic Bobby Dodd Stadium at Hyundai Field in Atlanta, Georgia. The Yellow Jackets claim four national championships across four decades. The program has also won 16 conference titles.

Among the team's former coaches are John Heisman, for whom the Heisman Trophy is named, and Bobby Dodd, for whom the Bobby Dodd Coach of the Year Award and the school's stadium are named. Heisman coached the team that won the most lopsided game in football history (222–0), guided Georgia Tech to an undefeated 12–0–1 record in the Georgia Tech–Clemson football rivalry, and led the Jackets to a national championship. Dodd also led the Jackets to a national championship and oversaw their longest winning streak against the Georgia Bulldogs—8 straight games—in Tech's longest-running rivalry, called Clean, Old-Fashioned Hate (COFH).

In the 21st century, Georgia Tech has played in the ACC Championship Game four times: 2006, 2009, 2012, and 2014.

A number of successful collegiate and professional football players have played for Tech. The program has produced 48 first-team All-Americans and over 150 alumni who have played in the NFL. Some of the most notable players the school has produced are Calvin Johnson, Maxie Baughan, Demaryius Thomas, Keith Brooking, Joe Hamilton, Joe Guyon, Pat Swilling and Billy Shaw.

== History ==
=== Early history (1892–1944) ===
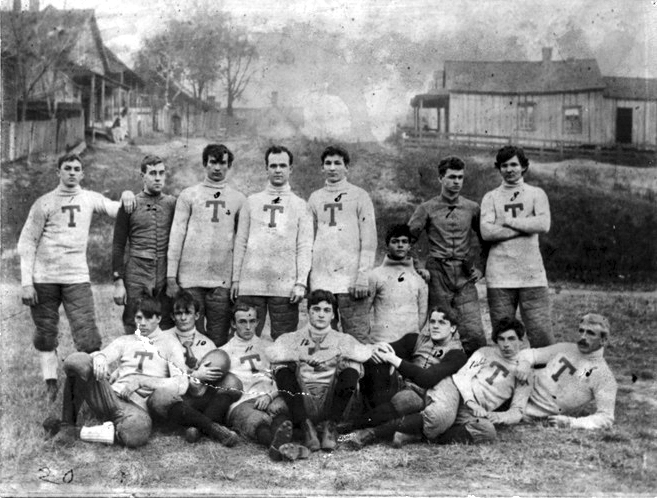
The 1893 Georgia Tech football team

Tech began its football program with several students forming a loose-knit troop of footballers called the Blacksmiths. On November 5, 1892, Tech played its first football game against Mercer University. The team lost to Mercer 12–6 in Macon, Georgia. (Note: The Macon Telegraph reported, "The game, while not brilliant, was full of earnest and determined effort, and this sort of playing, is after all, the most enjoyable to watch.") Tech played two other games during their first season and lost both of them for a season record of 0–3. Discouraged by these results, the Blacksmiths sought a coach to improve their record. Leonard Wood, an Army officer and Atlantan, heard of Tech's football struggles and volunteered to player-coach the team. Over the span of 1892–1903, Tech only won 8 games, tied in 5, and lost 32. In 1893, Tech played against the University of Georgia for the first time. Tech defeated Georgia 28–6 for the school's first-ever victory. The angry Georgia fans threw stones and other debris at the Tech players during and after the game. The poor treatment of the Blacksmiths by the Georgia faithful gave birth to the rivalry now known as Clean, Old-Fashioned Hate. In 1902, Jesse Thrash was the team's first All-Southern selection. He began the season as a sub and closed it as the undisputed star of the Tech team.

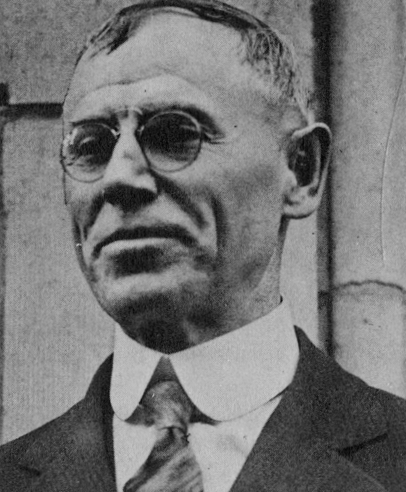
John Heisman coached the team from 1904 to 1919

Oliver Jones Huie was selected by Ga Tech's athletic association to coach the football team for the 1903 season when the team won 3 and lost 5 games. A professional coach was desperately needed if Tech wished to build a truly competitive football program. The first game of the 1903 season was a 73–0 destruction at the hands of John Heisman's Clemson; shortly after the season, Tech offered Heisman a coaching position.

John Heisman put together 16 consecutive non-losing seasons, amassed 104 wins, including three undefeated campaigns and a 32-game undefeated streak. From 1915 to 1918 Georgia Tech went 30–1–2 and outscored opponents 1611–93 utilizing his jump shift offense. (Note: From 1915 to 1920 the team went 45–5–2 and outscored opponents 2180 to 142.) He would also muster a 5-game winning streak against the hated Georgia Bulldogs from 1904 to 1908 before incidents led up to the cutting of athletic ties with Georgia in 1919. Heisman was hired by Tech for $2,250 a year and 30% of the home ticket sales. Heisman would not disappoint the Tech faithful as his first season was an 8–1–1 performance, the first winning season since 1893. One source relates: "The real feature of the season was the marvelus advance made by the Georgia School of Technology which burst from fetters that kept it in the lowest class for ten years."

His team posted victories over Georgia, Tennessee, University of Florida at Lake City, and Cumberland, and a tie with his last employer, Clemson. He suffered just one loss, to another first year coach, Mike Donahue of Auburn. The 1905 team went 6–0–1. The 1906 team beat Auburn for the first time. Stars of this early period for Tech include Lob Brown and Billy Wilson. The 1907 and 1908 teams were led by "Twenty Percent" Davis. Pat Patterson was All-Southern in 1910. Patterson was captain in 1911, a season in which future coach William Alexander was a reserve quarterback. Heisman helped students construct Grant Field in 1913, when Alf McDonald was quarterback. The 1915 team went undefeated.

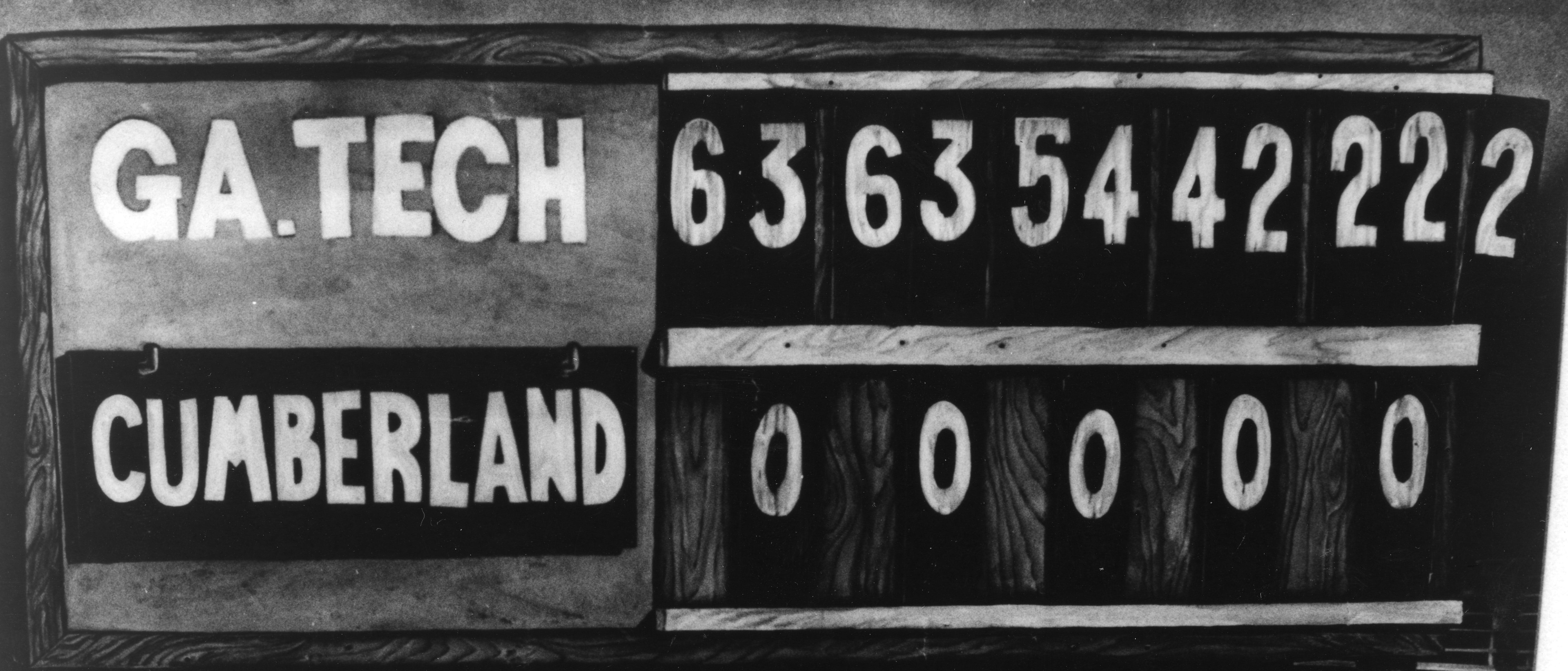
The 1916 scoreboard

Arguably the most notable game of Heisman's career was the most lopsided victory in college football history. In 1916, Cumberland College ended its football program and attempted to cancel a scheduled game with Heisman's Jackets. Heisman, however, was seeking vengeance for a 22–0 baseball loss to Cumberland in the spring of 1916, a game in which Heisman suspected Cumberland of hiring professional players to pose as Cumberland students. Heisman refused the game's cancellation and Cumberland mustered up a group of commonfolk to play Tech. Tech won 222–0. Neither team achieved a first down other than a touchdown, as Cumberland either punted or turned the ball over before a first down and Tech scored on almost every play from scrimmage. Jim Preas, Tech's kicker, kicked 16 point after tries, which is still a record for a single game.

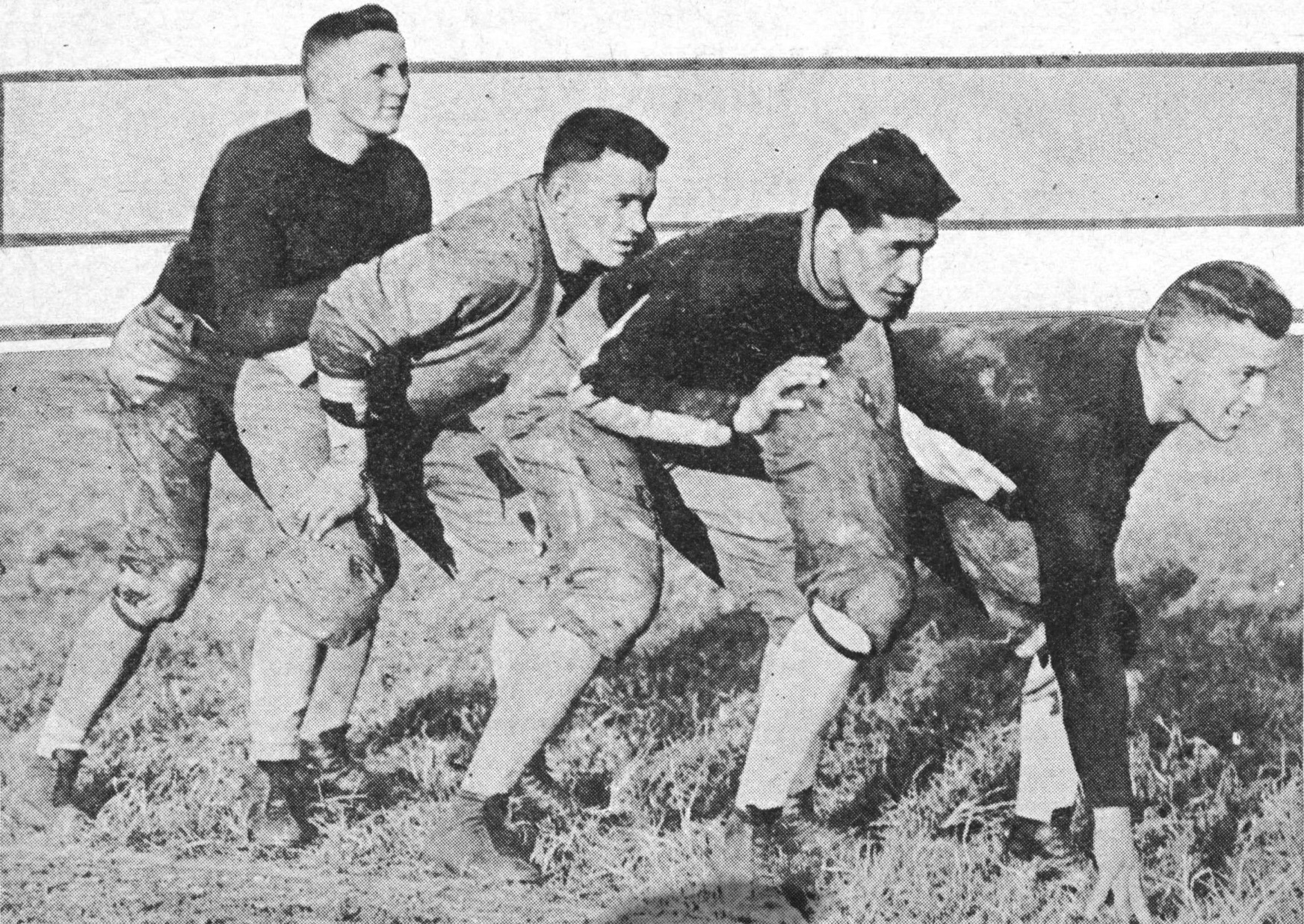
1917 Georgia Tech backfield.

In 1917 Tech won its first national championship behind the backfield of Everett Strupper, Joe Guyon, Al Hill, and Judy Harlan. It was the first national title for a Southern team, and for many years the "Golden Tornado" was considered the finest team the region ever produced. Strupper and captain Walker Carpenter were the first two players from the Deep South ever selected first-team All-American. Heisman challenged Pop Warner's undefeated Pittsburgh team to a decisive national championship game, but he declined. In the next season of 1918, Tech lost a lopsided game to Pitt 32–0. Center Bum Day became the first player from the south selected for Walter Camp's first team. In 1919, Auburn upset Tech for the SIAA crown. By 1919, Heisman had divorced his wife and felt that he would embarrass his wife socially if he remained in Atlanta. Heisman moved to Pennsylvania, leaving Tech in the hands of William Alexander.

William Alexander had attended Georgia Tech and after graduating as valedictorian of his class in 1912, taught mathematics at Tech and served as Heisman's assistant coach. In 1920, he was given the job of head coaching Tech's football team. Alexander retained Heisman's 'jump shift' offense, and in his first season he saw Tech win an SIAA title behind captain Buck Flowers, the first Georgia Tech player inducted into the College Football Hall of Fame. Tech suffered its only loss again to Warner's Pitt, and finished the season with a win over rival Auburn. Tackle Bill Fincher made Camp's first team All-America. (Note: The yearbook remarked, "Bill began his great work on the sand lots of Tech Hi here in Atlanta years ago and ended it up by smearing "Fatty" Warren of the Auburn Tigers all over the flats of Grant Field on Turkey Day last.")

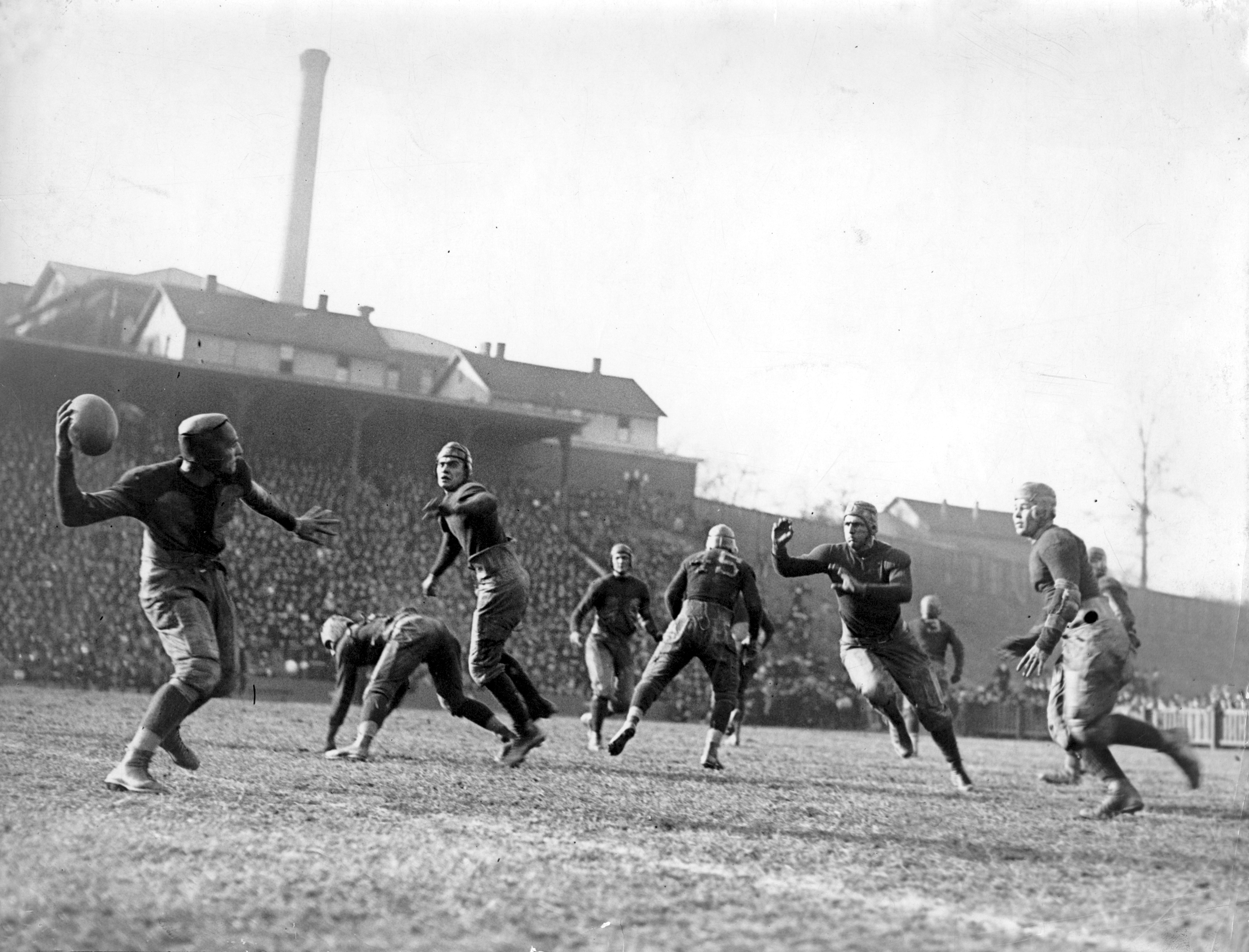
Georgia Tech vs Auburn, 1921

The 1921 and 1922 teams also claimed SIAA titles. The 1921 team suffered its only loss to undefeated, eastern power Penn State. Tech was captained by fullback Judy Harlan. Future Tech fullback Sam Murray was asked about a certain strong runner in the 1930s, "He's good. But if I were playing again, I would have one wish – never to see bearing down upon me a more fearsome picture of power than Judy Harlan blocking for Red Barron." Barron ran for 1,459 yards on the season.

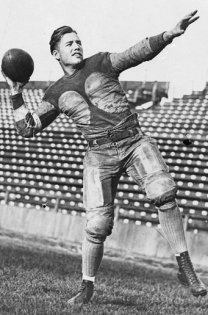
Doug Wycoff

From 1923 to 1925, though Tech failed to claim a conference title, it had one of its best-ever players: fullback Doug Wycoff, "the outstanding back of the South for the past two years." Coach Alexander recalled "The work of Douglas Wycoff against Notre Dame two years in succession was brilliant in the extreme, as was his plunging against Penn. State when we defeated them twice." (Note: Morgan Blake, sports writer for the Atlanta Journal, said of an all-time All-Southern list: "It seems to us that one name is left out in this collection, who may have been the best all-around player the South has had. "We have reference to Doug Wycoff of Tech who, for three straight years, was practically the unanimous all-Southern football choice, despite the fact that Georgia Tech had very lean years during his period of play at this institution. If Wycoff had been flanked by such a pair of halfbacks as Red Barron and Buck Flowers, or Thomason and Mizell while he was with the Jackets, he would have been an all-American. As it was he had to carry all of the offensive load and on the defense he was a wheelhorse. He was a great punter and passer. If Wycoff was not the best all-around player the South had produced then he was very close to the peak.") Tech and UGA renewed their annual rivalry game in 1925 after an eight-year hiatus. Quarterback Ike Armstrong thought the game clock read five seconds remaining in the game when in actuality it was five minutes. Williams set up his offense for a field goal and kicked it to put Tech up 3–0 on first down. Luckily for Williams, Tech won 3–0.

In 1927, Alexander instituted "the Plan." Georgia was highly rated to start the 1927 season, known as the "dream and wonder team", and justified their rating throughout the season going 9–0 in their first 9 games. Alexander's plan was to minimize injuries by benching his starters early no matter the score of every game before the UGA finale. On December 3, 1927, UGA rolled into Atlanta on the cusp of a national and conference title. Tech's well rested starters were helped by the rain and shut out the Bulldogs 12–0, ending any chance of UGA's first national title, while netting the SIAA title.

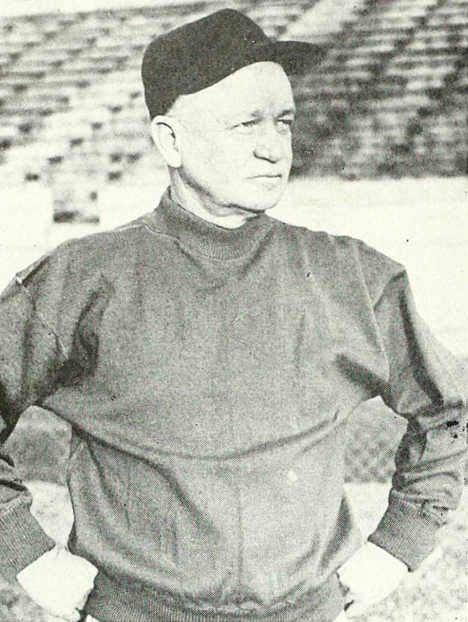
Coach Alexander.

Alexander's 1928 team amassed a perfect record and won the school's second national title. The team was led at center by captain Peter Pund and upset Notre Dame. "I sat at Grant Field and saw a magnificent Notre Dame team suddenly recoil before the furious pounding of one man–Pund, center", said legendary coach Knute Rockne. "Nobody could stop him. I counted 20 scoring plays that this man ruined." The 1928 team was also the very first Tech team to attend a bowl game. The team was invited to the Rose Bowl to play California. (Note: Tech traveled by train to meet the awaiting Golden Bears.) The game was a defensive struggle, with the first points scored after a Georgia Tech fumble. The loose ball was scooped up by California center Roy Riegels and then accidentally returned in the wrong direction. Riegels returned the ball all the way to California's 3-yard line. After Riegels was finally stopped by his own teammate at the 1-yard line, he was swarmed by a group of Tech players. The Bears opted to punt from the end zone. The punt was blocked and converted by Tech into a safety giving Tech a 2–0 lead. (Note: Vance Maree blocked the punt.) Cal scored a touchdown and a point after but Tech would score another touchdown to win the game 8–7. This victory made Tech the 10–0 undefeated national champion of 1928. (Note: After the game, "Stumpy" Thomason acquired a live bear cub. He brought the cub back to Atlanta, where it lived under the bleachers of Grant Field for several years before it moved along with Stumpy up to Pittsburgh.) Coach Alexander found campus spirit to be particularly low during the Great Depression. His football program (and the other athletic teams) had very few student fans attending the games. He helped to establish a spirit organization known as the Yellow Jacket Club in 1930 to bolster student spirit. The group would later become the Ramblin' Reck Club. Georgia Tech football declined following the 1928 championship, and did not post another winning record until 1937. The 1939 team was SEC co-champion. The only retired jersey in Georgia Tech football history is No. 19. The number belonged to Tech halfback Clint Castleberry. Castleberry played on the No. 5 ranked 1942 Tech team as a true freshman and was third place in the 1942 Heisman Trophy voting. After ending his freshman year at Tech, Castleberry elected to join the war effort and signed up for the Army Air Corps. While co-piloting a Martin B-26 Marauder over Africa, Castleberry, his crew, and another B-26 disappeared and were never heard from again. (Note: Despite an extensive six-day search involving American and British search crews, on November 23, 1944, all crew members were officially re-classified from MIA to KNB (killed, no body).) Castleberry has been memorialized on Grant Field ever since, with a prominent No. 19 on display in the stadium. The 1943 and 1944 teams won SEC titles. Coach Alexander finally retired in 1944 after winning 134 games as head coach and taking Tech to the Rose Bowl, Orange Bowl, Cotton Bowl Classic, and Sugar Bowl. To this day, Alexander has the second most victories of any Tech football coach. The record for most coaching victories in Tech history is still held by Alexander's then coordinator and eventual successor Bobby Dodd.

=== Bobby Dodd era (1945–1966) ===
Bobby Dodd in 1952

President Blake R Van Leer believed athletics were an important part of collegiate life, he championed that belief with public support of coaches like Dodd. Van Leer was recorded being proud of Dodd's accomplishments, celebrating him among peers and being a supporting friend. Bobby Dodd took over the Georgia Tech football program following Coach Alexander's retirement in 1944. He did not believe in intense physical practices but rather precise and well executed practices. Dodd's philosophy translated to winning. He set the record for career wins at Tech at 165 career coaching wins including a 31-game winning streak from 1951 to 1952. He also managed to capture two Southeastern Conference Titles and the 1952 National Title, which concluded a 12–0 perfect season and Sugar Bowl conquest of previously undefeated, seventh ranked Ole Miss in a season that also included victories over Orange Bowl champions, 9th ranked, Alabama; 15th ranked Gator Bowl champions Florida Gators football; 16th ranked Duke; and a 7–4 rival Georgia. While 9–0 Michigan State would capture the AP and UP titles, the Yellow Jackets' were ranked first in the International News Service poll. Dodd also understood the deep-seated rivalry with the University of Georgia. His teams won 8 games in a row over the Bulldogs from 1949 to 1956 outscoring the Bulldogs 176–39 during the winning streak. This 8–game winning streak against Georgia remains the longest winning streak by either team in the series. Dodd would finish his career with a 12–9 record against the Bulldogs. In 1956, much controversy preceded the 1956 Sugar Bowl. Segregationists tried to keep Pitt fullback/linebacker Bobby Grier from playing because he was black. Georgia's governor Marvin Griffin privately met with Coach Dodd and Georgia Tech President Van Leer, where he told them the game could go on without pushback. Immediately after, the governor issued a telegram stating the South stands in Armageddon and publicly threatened to remove funding if Georgia Tech's president Van Leer did not cancel the game. Dodd, along with his team, publicly supported moving forward with the game. President Van Leer threatened to resign in a show of support. Ultimately, Bobby Grier played, making this the first integrated Sugar Bowl and is regarded as the first integrated bowl game in the Deep South.

Dodd's tenure included Georgia Tech's withdrawal from the Southeastern Conference. The initial spark for Dodd's withdrawal was a historic feud with Alabama Crimson Tide Coach Bear Bryant. The feud began when Tech was visiting the Tide at Legion Field in Birmingham in 1961. After a Tech punt, Alabama fair-caught the ball. Chick Granning of Tech was playing coverage and relaxed after the signal for the fair catch. Darwin Holt of Alabama continued play and smashed his elbow into Granning's face causing severe fracturing in his face, a broken nose, and blood-filled sinuses. Granning was knocked unconscious and suffered a severe concussion, the result of which left him unable to play football ever again. Dodd sent Bryant a letter asking Bryant to suspend Holt after game film indicated Holt had intentionally injured Granning. Bryant never suspended Holt. The lack of discipline infuriated Dodd and sparked Dodd's interest in withdrawing from the SEC. Another issue of concern for Dodd was Alabama's and other SEC schools' over-recruitment of players. Universities would recruit more players than they had roster space for. During the summer practice sessions, the teams in question would cut the players well after signing day thus preventing the cut players from finding new colleges to play for. Dodd appealed the SEC administration to punish the "tryout camps" of his fellow SEC members but the SEC did not. Finally, Dodd withdrew Georgia Tech from the SEC in 1964. Tech would remain an independent like Notre Dame and Penn State (at the time) during the final four years of Dodd's coaching tenure. In 1967, Dodd passed the head coach position to his favorite coordinator, Bud Carson. Dodd simply retained his athletic director position, which he had acquired in 1950. He would not retire from athletic directing until 1976.

=== Bud Carson era (1967–1971) ===
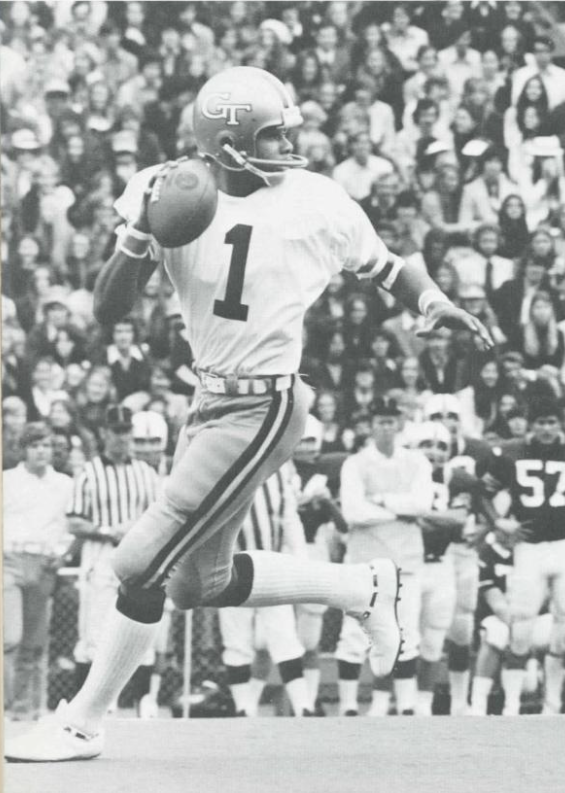
Eddie McAshan (pictured 1972) became Georgia Tech's first African American quarterback under Carson.

Bud Carson was Tech's defensive coordinator in 1966. His job was to appease the Tech fan base Bobby Dodd had accumulated. Carson was not the charismatic leader like Dodd but rather a strategy man that enjoyed intense game planning. Carson's most notable achievements included recruiting Tech's first ever African American scholarship athlete and being the first Tech head coach to be fired. Carson recruited Eddie McAshan to play quarterback in 1970. After several Summer practices, McAshan won the starting quarterback job and became the first African American quarterback to start for a major Southeastern university. This decision initially polarized Georgia Tech's fan base, but after winning his first 4 starts and leading Tech to a 9–3 season after three straight 4–6 seasons, McAshan won the hearts of the Tech faithful. McAshan's besting of UGA in the annual rivalry game made McAshan a fixture on campus. The following season, however, led to Carson's demise. In 1971, Tech went 6–6 and a fan base used to Bobby Dodd's 8 wins per season average forced Carson out by James E. Boyd's hand. Carson went on to form the Steel Curtain Pittsburgh Steelers defense.

=== Bill Fulcher era (1972–1973) ===
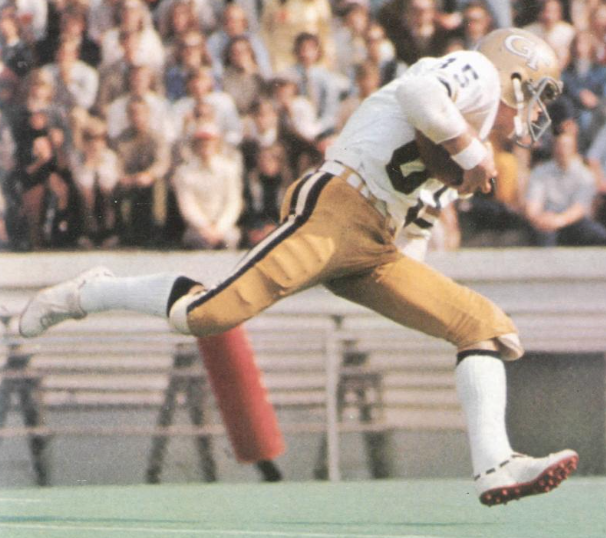
Jimmy Robinson during a 1972 game

Bill Fulcher supplanted Bud Carson. Fulcher appeared to be the right choice but quit after two seasons, overwhelmed by racial incidents. Fulcher's tenure included a terrible feud with Eddie McAshan, which peaked before the 1972 UGA game. McAshan had requested additional tickets for the game so that his family could attend. Fulcher refused the ticket request and McAshan sat out of practice in protest. Fulcher responded by suspending the quarterback for the UGA game and the upcoming Liberty Bowl. The story exploded on the national scene when Jesse Jackson attended the UGA game, allowing McAshan to sit with him outside of the stadium in protest.

=== Pepper Rodgers era (1974–1979) ===
Alumnus Pepper Rodgers was hired soon after Fulcher quit, hired away from UCLA. Like Carson and Fulcher, he simply could not return Tech to its national prominence of Dodd's era; in six seasons, his overall record was 34–31–2 (.522). Rodgers' flamboyant demeanor shortened his welcome at the school, and athletic director Doug Weaver replaced him with Bill Curry after the 1979 season. Homer Rice became athletic director and attempted to reinvigorate Tech's program by joining the Atlantic Coast Conference in 1980.

=== Bill Curry era (1980–1986) ===
Alumnus Bill Curry had no experience as a head coach, but was a change after Rodgers. Curry's early years saw tech reach its lowest point in modern history. His first two Tech teams in 1980 and 1981 went 2–19–1 (.114), with the only bright spots being a brilliant 24–21 road victory over Bear Bryant's Alabama team at Legion Field to open the 1981 season and a 3–3 slug fest in 1980 with top-ranked Notre Dame at Grant Field. Things had gotten so bad, they could only get better.

Curry slowly rebuilt the team, restored a winning mentality to the Georgia Tech fan base; Tech won nine games in 1985, including a 17–14 victory over Michigan State in the All American Bowl. Tech's 1984–1985 teams featured the "Black Watch" defense; created by defensive coordinator Don Lindsey, it featured linebackers Ted Roof and Jim Anderson, safety Mark Hogan, and lineman Pat Swilling. The elite defensive players were awarded black stripes down the center of their helmets and black GT emblems on the side of their helmets. Curry's leadership and ability to build a winning program sparked interest from the Crimson Tide and Alabama hired Curry away from Tech in 1986.

=== Bobby Ross era (1987–1991) ===
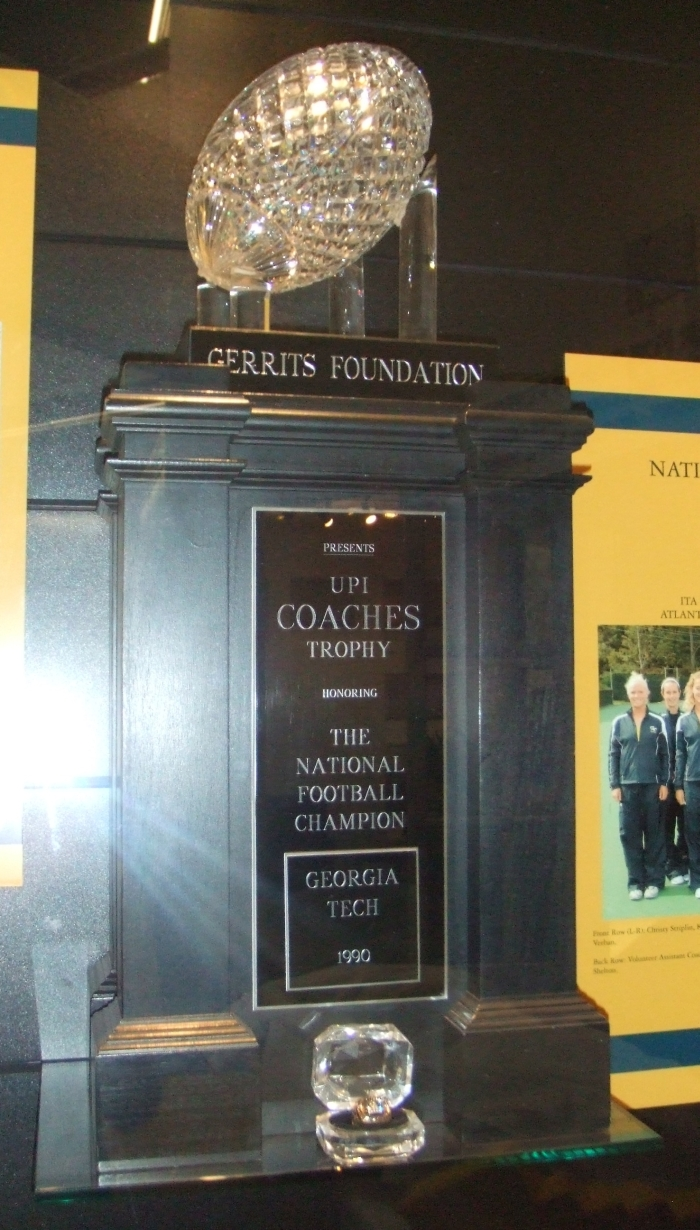
1990 AFCA National Championship Trophy Georgia Tech received.

After Curry's departure, Tech hired the talented Maryland Terrapins Coach Bobby Ross, who departed a Maryland athletic program in turmoil after the Len Bias tragedy. Bobby Ross came from Maryland after winning three ACC titles over four years. Ross' first season at Tech experienced a severe talent vacuum after Curry's departure, and the players Ross inherited resisted the changes he demanded. The team only won two games, and Ross contemplated ending his coaching career after a humbling loss to Wake Forest in 1987. Ross decided to remain at Tech and continued to rebuild Tech's program. The turning point came in 1989 with the recruitment of Shawn Jones and several other key freshman. After two seasons and only five total wins, Jones helped the Jackets rebound at the end of the 1989 season. In Jones' sophomore season, Tech powered through their schedule and won the ACC. The four-game unbeaten streak in 1989 extended all the way through 1990 and into the 1991 Citrus Bowl. The key victory in the streak was a huge 41–38 come from behind upset victory over then No.1 ranked Virginia in Charlottesville before a nationwide TV audience. Tech demolished Nebraska 45–21 in the 1991 Citrus Bowl, finishing the season 11–0–1, and earning a share of the 1990 National Title with the Colorado Buffaloes. Tech's winning streak ended against Penn State in the 1991 Kick Off Classic. Ross and Jones never replicated that 1990 season but managed to win 8 games in 1991 making Shawn Jones one of the most heralded quarterbacks in Tech history. Ross was offered a head coach position after the 1991 season for the San Diego Chargers, which he took.

=== Bill Lewis era (1992–1994) ===
After first considering Ross assistant coaches, Ralph Friedgen and George O'Leary, Tech hired Bill Lewis away from East Carolina soon after Ross' departure. When Lewis was hired, the Tech faithful hoped he would continue to build on Ross' success. He had just led East Carolina to an 11–1 record and a final ranking of ninth in the nation. However, Lewis' first season at Tech in 1992 saw the Jackets collapse to only a 5–6 record just two years removed from a national championship. Preseason All-American Shawn Jones suffered from nagging injuries, leaving Tech's offense inept. After Jones' fourth year ran out, redshirt freshman Donnie Davis stepped in to fill his shoes in 1993, which saw another 5–6 season. In just two years, Lewis had completely squandered the successful momentum established by Bobby Ross. During the Summer of '94, George O'Leary was rehired as defensive coordinator. With Davis injured in spring practice, Lewis recruited Tom Luginbill as his replacement. Luginbill was a proficient passer at Palomar College, a junior college in California, and his first two games in 1994 showed promise. Tech almost upset Arizona who was projected as the No. 1 team in the nation by Sports Illustrated and won 45–26 over Western Carolina. However, Tech lost its next six games before Lewis was fired with three games remaining in the season. O'Leary was named interim coach for the rest of the season.

=== George O'Leary era (1994–2001) ===
Georgia Tech lost their final three games, including a 48–10 drubbing at the hands of Georgia. Despite this, Tech dropped the "interim" tag from O'Leary's title and named him head coach in 1995. O'Leary's first season saw Senior Donnie Davis return as starter and Tech won 6 games. O'Leary's second season saw the emergence of Joe Hamilton as starter when Brandon Shaw struggled in his first two starts. Hamilton eventually led the Jackets back to bowl contention and Tech attended its first bowl in six years, the 1997 Carquest Bowl. Hamilton's prowess as a runner and passer thrilled the Georgia Tech fans. Offensive coordinator Ralph Friedgen utilized a complex offense with Hamilton that featured option football mixed in with complex timing routes. Hamilton racked up yardage, touchdowns, and wins for Tech. In 1998, Hamilton and Tech's high powered offense won 10 games and a season ending victory over Notre Dame in the Gator Bowl. Hamilton's senior year put him on the national stage. He was a leading candidate for the Heisman Trophy against rushing phenomenon Ron Dayne. Hamilton passed for over 3,000 yards and rushed for over 700 yards. But while Hamilton dazzled, the Georgia Tech defense was a liability (they allowed around 28 points per game), and may have ultimately cost Hamilton the 1999 Heisman Trophy. In a late-season, nationally televised game against Wake Forest, Tech gave up 26 points and Hamilton threw two interceptions and no touchdowns. As an indirect result, Dayne went on to win the Heisman (Joe was runner-up). Hamilton's Georgia Tech career ended on a sour note in the 2000 Gator Bowl against the Miami, where the Jackets lost 28–13. The following season, redshirt junior George Godsey, a more traditional pocket passer, succeeded Hamilton at the helm of Tech's powerful offense. The drop-off was minimal—Godsey continued where Hamilton left off, winning 9 games in 2000 and 8 games in 2001. In 2000, Godsey also led Tech to their third straight victory over the archrival Georgia Bulldogs.

The end of the 2001 season saw George O'Leary entertain a coaching offer from Notre Dame after Bob Davie announced resignation as Irish head coach. O'Leary was eventually awarded the position, but it was revoked shortly thereafter when Notre Dame discovered that O'Leary had fabricated several aspects of his resume. He claimed to have played three years for the University of New Hampshire and to have attained a master's degree from New York University; in actuality, he had attended NYU but did not graduate, and he never played a down of New Hampshire football. Following O'Leary's departure, Mac McWhorter was named interim head coach for Georgia Tech's bowl game, a victory over Stanford in the 2001 Seattle Bowl.

=== Chan Gailey era (2002–2007) ===
The following spring, Chan Gailey was hired to replace O'Leary as Georgia Tech's head coach. Chan Gailey came to Georgia Tech in 2002 after head coaching stints with the Dallas Cowboys, Samford Bulldogs, and Troy Trojans. Gailey's first team in 2002 managed to win seven games under the quarterbacking of A.J. Suggs. The most notable game of the 2002 season was an upset of National Title Contender North Carolina State. Georgia Tech rallied in the fourth quarter to upset NC State and end Philip Rivers's Heisman Trophy hopes. In 2003, eleven Georgia Tech players were found academically ineligible. Despite the academic losses and the playing of true freshman Reggie Ball, Gailey would lead Tech to a seven-win season and humiliation of Tulsa in the Humanitarian Bowl. P.J. Daniels racked up over 300 yards rushing in the effort.

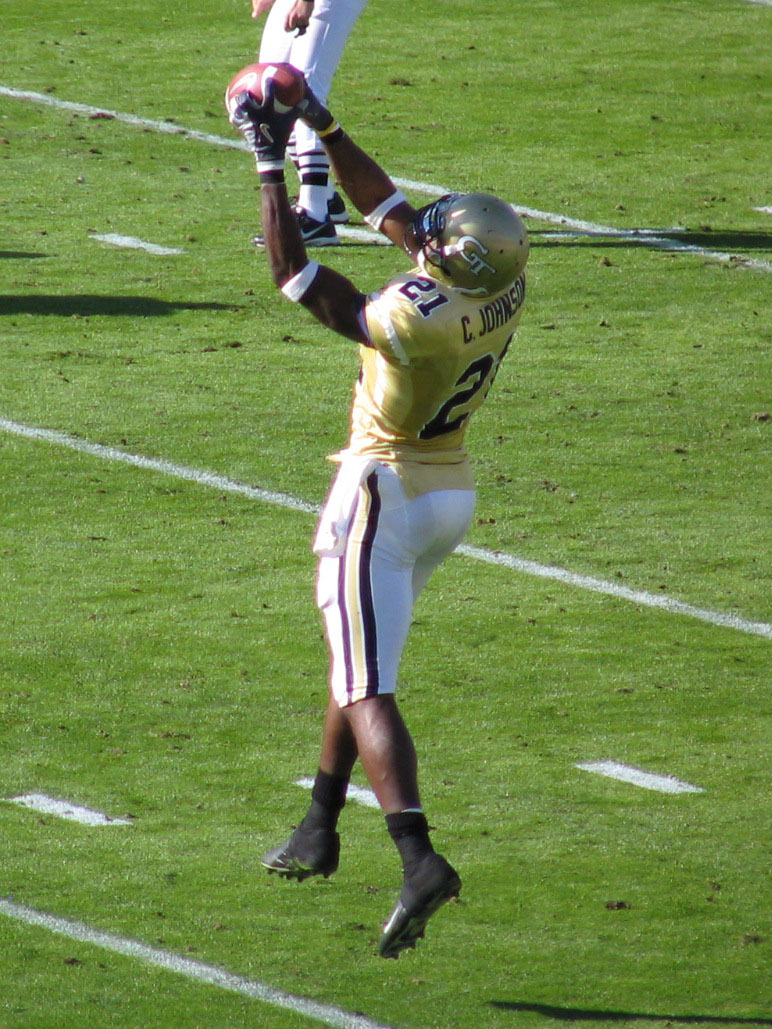
Calvin Johnson catching a pass

2004 and 2005 saw Georgia Tech improve talent and skill wise but Tech won seven games again. Star Calvin Johnson arrived as a true freshman in 2004. His performance against Clemson in 2004 helped cement Johnson's place in the annals of all-time Tech greats. Two off-the-field problems affected the Yellow Jackets' 2005 season. First, Reuben Houston, a starting cornerback, was arrested for possession of over 100 pounds of marijuana. Houston was dismissed from the football team immediately following this arrest but a later court order forced Coach Gailey to allow Houston to return to the team. Houston would see little playing time following the court order. At the end of the 2005 season, an NCAA investigation found that 11 ineligible players had played for the Yellow Jackets between the 1998 and 2005 seasons. These players played while not making progress towards graduation on the NCAA-approved schedule. The football victories for that season were initially revoked, and Georgia Tech was put on two years of NCAA probation. Twelve football scholarships were stricken from Georgia Tech's allotment for the 2006 and 2007 freshman classes. The Georgia Tech Athletic Department appealed this decision by the NCAA, and the records were restored but scholarship reductions and probation remained. Athletic Director Dave Braine retired in January 2006, and Dan Radakovich was hired as athletic director. Gailey's most successful year at Georgia Tech was in 2006 with nine victories and the ACC Coastal Division championship. The Yellow Jackets football team reached its first New Year's Bowl since the 1999 Gator Bowl and played the West Virginia Mountaineers in the Gator Bowl. Tashard Choice led the ACC in rushing yards and Calvin Johnson led the ACC in receptions and receiving yardage. After an impressive 33–3 victory at Notre Dame to open the 2007 season, the team slid to finish 7–6. On the morning of Monday, November 26, 2007, Gailey was fired from the Yellow Jackets, two days after another heartbreaking loss to the University of Georgia. The Yellow Jackets' Athletic Department hired Paul Johnson, then the head coach at Navy and former Georgia Southern head coach, as Gailey's replacement on December 7, 2007.

=== Paul Johnson era (2008–2018) ===
On Friday, December 7, 2007, less than two weeks after Georgia Tech announced the firing of Chan Gailey, Paul Johnson was announced as the new Georgia Tech head football coach. Johnson was hired under a seven-year contract worth more than $11 million. Johnson immediately began installing his unique flexbone option offense at Georgia Tech. By the regular season's end, Johnson had led the Yellow Jackets to a 9–3 record including an ACC Coastal Division Co-Championship and a 45–42 win in Athens, Georgia over arch-rival UGA, Tech's first win against the Bulldogs since 2000. In recognition of his accomplishments in his first season, Johnson was named 2008 ACC Coach of the Year by the Atlantic Coast Sports Media Association as well as the CBSSports.com coach of the year.

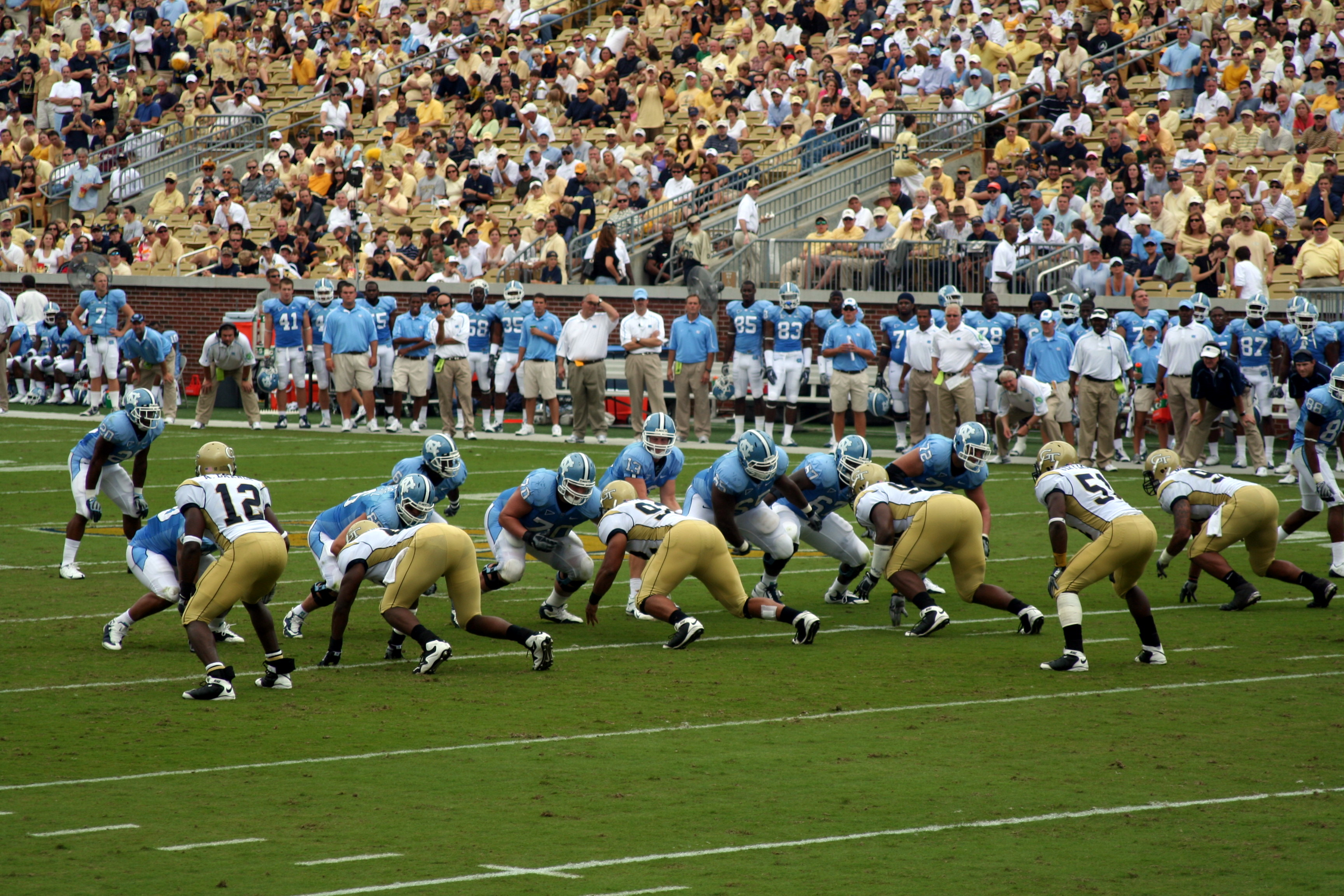
GT vs. UNC, 2009

Several weeks after Johnson's defeat of rival Georgia, Georgia Tech rewarded Johnson with a new contract worth $17.7 million, a 53% raise that made him the second highest paid coach in the ACC before he had even completed his first year in the conference. In 2009, Johnson led the Yellow Jackets to historic wins over Florida State in Tallahassee, No. 4 Virginia Tech (breaking an 0–17 losing streak to top five opponents at Grant Field in the past 47 years), and Virginia in Charlottesville. The jackets went on to defeat the Clemson Tigers to make them ACC champions, a title that would be vacated on July 14, 2011, due to NCAA infractions. The Yellow Jackets went on to lose to Iowa in the Orange Bowl, 24–14. Georgia Tech had another significant win over the No. 5 Clemson Tigers on October 29, 2011, giving the Tigers their first defeat of the season and enabling QB Tevin Washington to rush for 176 yards on 27 carries and a touchdown, breaking a school record. In 2012, Georgia Tech was declared the winner of the ACC Coastal Division on November 19, 2012, clinching it with a victory over Duke 42–24 and finishing with a 5–3 ACC record. Georgia Tech played against Florida State in the 2012 ACC Championship Game, which was coach Paul Johnson's second appearance in the title game. The Yellow Jackets lost to the Seminoles 21–15.

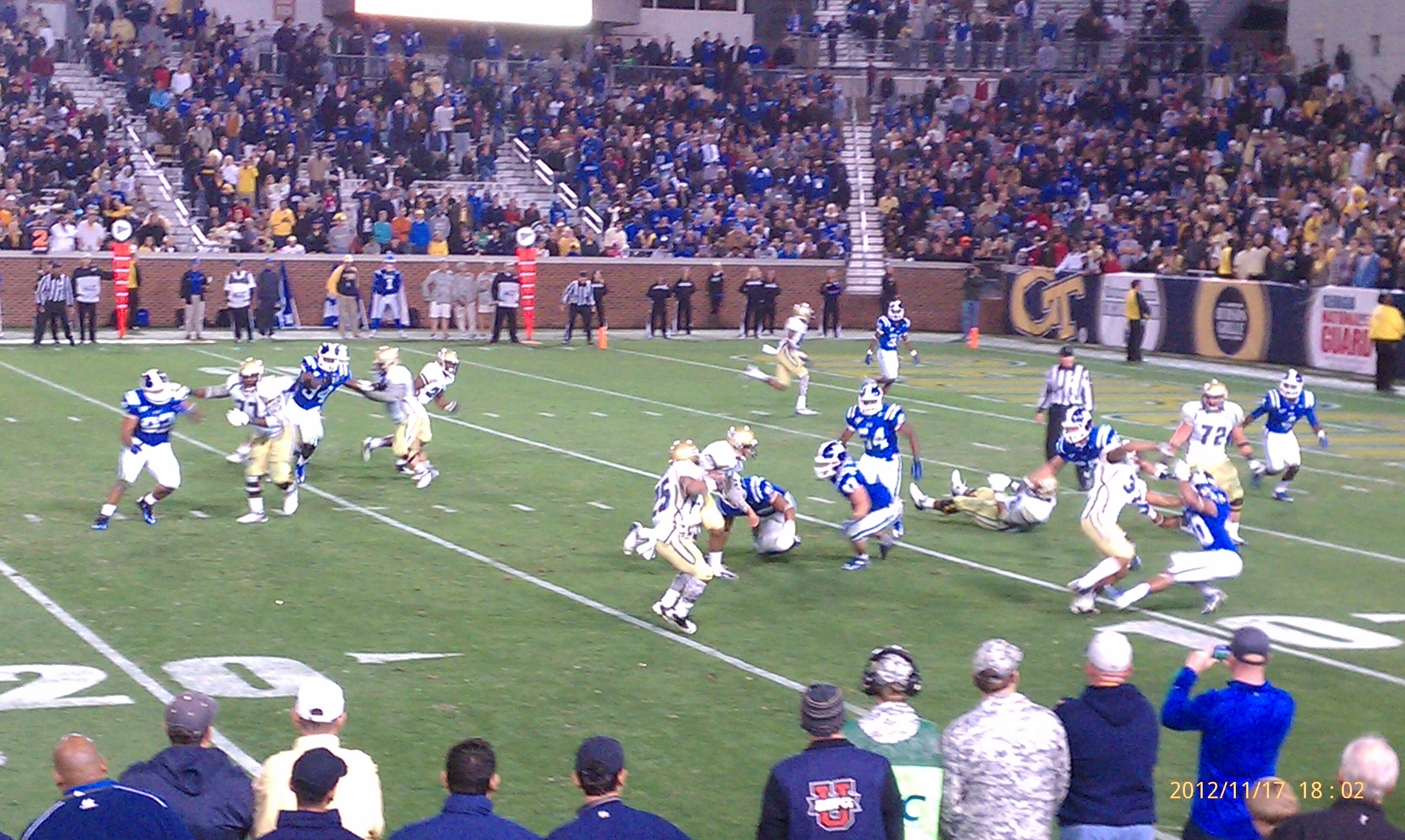
GT vs. Duke 11/17/12

The 2014 Yellow Jackets, despite being predicted to finish 5th in Coastal Division by ESPN, garnered a 10–2 regular season record (6–2 ACC), including wins over then No. 19 Clemson and No. 9 Georgia to finish the regular season ranked No. 11 by the recently created College Football Playoff Committee. The highlight of the season was an overtime thriller that lead to the defeat of the Bulldogs in Athens, featuring Harrison Butker's 53-yard field goal that sent the game into overtime, a 1-yard rushing touchdown by RB Zack Laskey, and a game clinching interception of UGA quarterback Hutson Mason's throw by cornerback D.J. White. Georgia Tech met No. 4 Florida State in the 2014 ACC Championship Game in Charlotte, North Carolina, losing 37–35. Following their conference championship, Florida State was chosen in the top four (ranked No. 3), under which circumstance the Orange Bowl selected Georgia Tech (now No. 12) as its replacement to face the No. 7 Mississippi State Bulldogs on December 31, 2014. Justin Thomas led the Jackets to a dominating 49–34 win for the Yellow Jackets, finishing the season 11–3, No. 8 in AP poll and No. 7 in the American Coaches Poll.

The 2015 season showed the Yellow Jackets a 3–9 record, after numerous injuries throughout the entire year. Their only notable win was a 22–16 upset over No. 9 Florida State on Tech's Homecoming Night, when the Yellow Jackets blocked an attempted field goal by Florida State Kicker Roberto Aguayo, which was picked up by Lance Austin and returned for the game-winning touchdown. This was later coined the "Miracle on Techwood Drive". 2015 year marked the first year since 1996 that Georgia Tech did not make a bowl appearance. The next year, 2016, marked a bounce-back season, with the Yellow Jackets, led by team captain Justin Thomas, posting a 9–4 record, including a win over Kentucky in the TaxSlayer Bowl. 2016 also saw a 28–27 victory over Georgia in Athens featuring a 14-point comeback in the 4th quarter topped off by a 6-yard TD rush on third down by Qua Searcy, with 30 seconds left in the game. The Yellow Jackets took a step back in 2017, finishing 5–6 (4–4 ACC) with close losses to Tennessee (42–41 in 2OT) at the Chick Fil A Kickoff Game in the newly constructed Mercedes-Benz Stadium, and at Miami (25–24). Despite starting the 2018 season 1–3, the Yellow Jackets rallied to finish the regular season 7–5. The most notable victory was that against rival Virginia Tech, making Georgia Tech the only conference opponent to win three consecutive games in Lane Stadium against Virginia Tech. The season ended with the 2018 Quick Lane Bowl, where the Jackets fell 34–10 to the Minnesota Golden Gophers. Johnson announced his retirement on November 28, 2018, effective following the team's bowl game. Geoff Collins was named Johnson's replacement on December 7, 2018.

=== Geoff Collins era (2019–2022) ===
Geoff Collins was announced on December 7, 2018, as the new head coach, to replace the retiring Paul Johnson, starting the 2019 season. Collins was hired under a seven-year contract worth more than $23 million. Geoff Collins, a native of Conyers, Georgia, was previously the head coach at Temple, defensive coordinator at Mississippi State and Florida, and previously worked with Georgia Tech as a graduate assistant and recruiting coordinator. In his first season the Jackets experienced several significant losses. A loss against The Citadel was the Jackets' first loss against an FCS opponent since 1983, and a 45–0 loss to Virginia Tech was the Jackets' first shutout loss at Bobby Dodd Stadium since 1957. Geoff Collins was fired from Georgia Tech along with athletic director Todd Stansbury on September 25, 2022, after three 3-win seasons and a 1–3 start in 2022. His final record at Georgia Tech was 10–28, one of the worst coaching records in Georgia Tech history.

=== Brent Key era (2022–present) ===
Brent Key, a Georgia Tech alumnus and football letterwinner who at the time was the OL coach, was named the interim for the rest of the 2022 season.

Key led the Yellow Jackets to a 4–4 record over the final eight games of the 2022 season. The four wins included two road victories over nationally ranked opponents – a 26–21 win at No. 24 Pitt in his first game at the helm on October 1 and a 21–17 triumph at No. 13 North Carolina on November 19. The Jackets overcame a plethora of injuries (which included its top two quarterbacks.) to finish 5–7 overall and 4–4 in Atlantic Coast Conference play after a 1–3 start. The overall and conference win totals were Tech's highest since 2018, as was its fourth-place finish in the ACC Coastal Division standings. Key's Jackets also defeated the three teams that finished ahead of them in the coastal division. (North Carolina, Pitt and Duke).

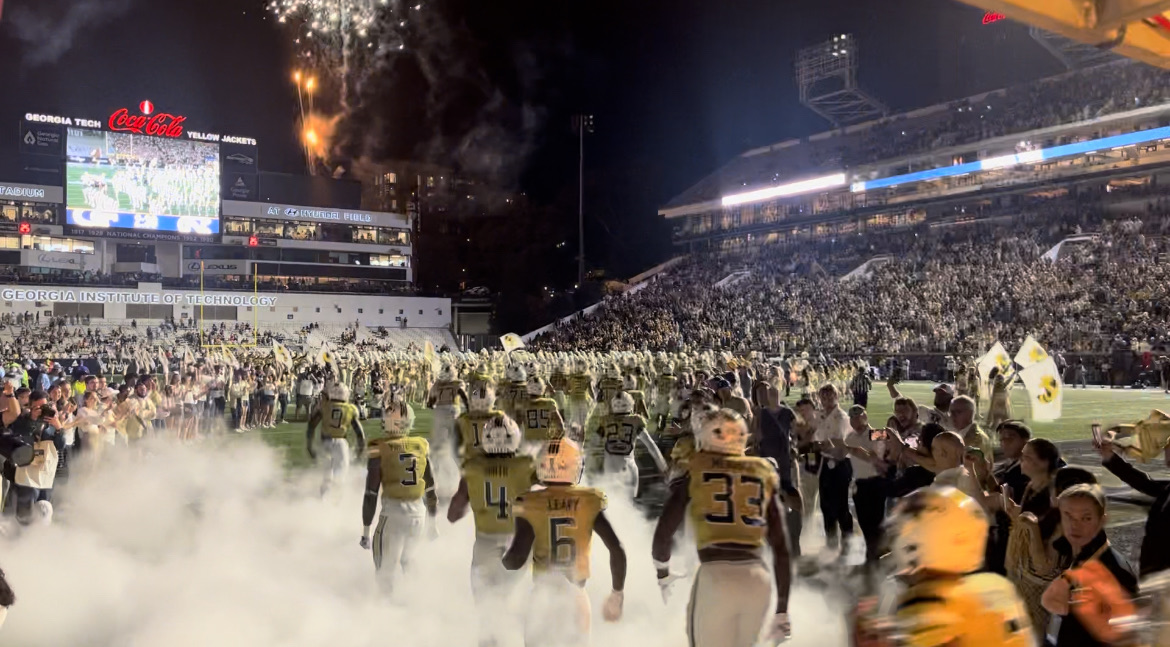
Tech enters the field before a game with North Carolina in 2023.

On Tuesday November 29, 2022 the interim tag was stripped and Key was named Georgia Tech's 21st head football coach. One of Key's most memorable wins came on October 7, 2023, when following an embarrassing loss to Bowling Green the week prior, the Yellow Jackets defeated the then 17th ranked Miami Hurricanes'. Miami could have won the game by taking a knee, but they ran the ball before fumbling with 26 seconds left. Tech drove 74 yards in four plays to win the game on a last second 44-yard touchdown pass from Haynes King to Christian Leary. It was Key's third win over a ranked ACC opponent on the road.

Tech finished the 2023 regular season at 6–6 and made its first bowl since 2018. The Jackets went 5–3 in ACC play and finished 4th in the conference. They then defeated UCF 30–17 in the Gasparilla Bowl to finish 7–6. It was their first winning season since 2018 and their first bowl win since 2016.

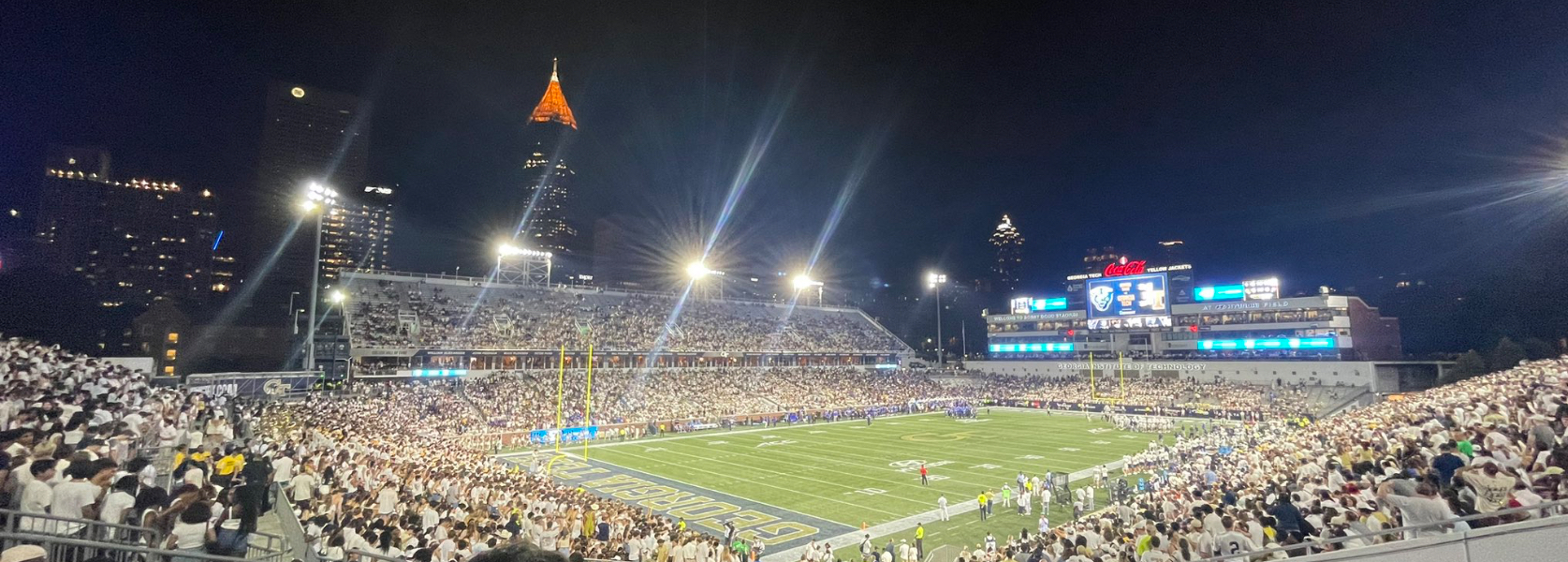
Bobby Dodd Stadium seen here during a game in 2024.

The Yellow Jackets began the 2024 campaign against the 9th-ranked Florida State Seminoles in Week 0. Tech and FSU played in the Aer Lingus Classic at Aviva Stadium in Dublin, Ireland. Tech upset the Seminoles 24–21, with the game-winning field goal being kicked by sophomore kicker Aiden Birr with no time left on the clock. Tech then beat crosstown foe Georgia State 35–12 the next week in the first ever meeting between the two Atlanta programs.

Tech started 5–2 through the first seven games, then starting quarterback Haynes King got injured in the win over North Carolina which led to a two game losing skid. Haynes King returned for the homecoming game against #4 Miami, however Tech also played freshman Aaron Philo for long passing situations as King's right shoulder was not fully healed. The Yellow Jackets pulled off their biggest upset in 15 years when they knocked the Hurricanes from the ranks of the unbeaten, winning 28–23 in front of a raucous crowd.

Tech's encore performance yielded a narrow 30–29 win against the NC State Wolfpack on November 21, 2024. On November 29, 2024, the Yellow Jackets battled #6 Georgia, losing 44–42 after 8 overtimes, the second most overtimes played in FBS history as of December 2024. In his first full game since recovering from a shoulder injury, quarterback Haynes King produced 413 yards of total offense – comprising 303 passing and 110 rushing yards – and 5 touchdowns. Eric Singleton, Jr. had 8 catches for 86 yards, with Jamal Haynes carrying the ball 13 times for 91 yards. Tech was defeated by Vanderbilt in the Birmingham Bowl, 35–27.

Their 2025 season began with a 27–20 road win at Colorado. The Yellow Jackets would win their first 8 games of the season, their best start since 1966. They would conclude the regular season with a 9–3 record before a 25–21 loss in the Pop-Tarts Bowl against BYU. They fined $50k for students storming the field after beating Clemson. Senior Quarterback Haynes King won ACC Player of the Year and the Earl Campbell Tyler Rose Award which recognizes the top offensive player with ties to the state of Texas.

2026 brought about a new look Tech team, as both King and offensive coordinator Buster Faulkner were gone. Key brought in former Tech QB Godsey to be the new OC.

== Conference affiliations ==
Georgia Tech has been a member of the Atlantic Coast Conference since 1983.

- Independent (1892–1915)
- Southern Intercollegiate Athletic Association (1916–1921)
- Southern Conference (1922–1932)
- Southeastern Conference (1933–1963)
- Independent (1964–1982)
- Atlantic Coast Conference (1983–present)

== Championships ==
=== National championships ===
Georgia Tech has been named national champions seven times by NCAA-designated major selectors, including the Coaches' Poll national championship in 1990. Georgia Tech claims the 1917, 1928, 1952, and 1990 championships.

Season	Coach	Selectors	Record	Bowl	Result	Final AP	Final Coaches
1917	John Heisman	Billingsley, Helms, Houlgate, NCF	9–0	–	–	–	–
1928	William Alexander	Berryman, Billingsley, Boand, Football Research, Helms, Houlgate, NCF, Parke Davis, Poling, Sagarin (ELO-Chess)	10–0	Rose Bowl	W 8–7	–	–
1952	Bobby Dodd	Berryman, Billingsley, INS, Poling, Sagarin (ELO-Chess)	12–0	Sugar Bowl	W 24–7	No. 2	No. 2
1990	Bobby Ross	Dunkel, FACT, NCF, Sagarin (ELO-Chess), UPI Coaches	11–0–1	Citrus Bowl	W 45–21	No. 2	No. 1

=== Conference championships ===
Georgia Tech has won 16 conference championships, nine outright and seven shared. Their 2009 ACC championship was later vacated by the NCAA.

Year	Conference	Coach	Overall record	Conference record
1916	SIAA	John Heisman	8–0–1	5–0
1917	SIAA	John Heisman	9–0	4–0
1918	SIAA	John Heisman	6–1	3–0
1920†	SIAA	William Alexander	8–1	5–0
1921†	SIAA	William Alexander	8–1	4–0
1922†	Southern	William Alexander	7–2	4–0
1927†	Southern	William Alexander	8–1–1	7–0–1
1928	Southern	William Alexander	10–0	7–0
1939†	SEC	William Alexander	8–2	6–0
1943	SEC	William Alexander	8–3	3–0
1944	SEC	William Alexander	8–3	4–0
1951†	SEC	Bobby Dodd	11–0–1	7–0
1952	SEC	Bobby Dodd	12–0	7–0
1990	ACC	Bobby Ross	11–0–1	6–0–1
1998†	ACC	George O'Leary	10–2	7–1
2009‡	ACC	Paul Johnson	11–3	7–1

† Co-champions
‡ Vacated by the NCAA

=== Division championships ===
Georgia Tech has won five division championships, with four of those leading to an appearance in the ACC Championship Game.

Year	Division	Coach	Opponent	CG Result
2006	ACC Coastal	Chan Gailey	Wake Forest	L 6–9
2008†	ACC Coastal	Paul Johnson	N/A lost tiebreaker to Virginia Tech	
2009	ACC Coastal	Paul Johnson	Clemson	W 39–34
2012†	ACC Coastal	Paul Johnson	Florida State	L 15–21
2014	ACC Coastal	Paul Johnson	Florida State	L 35–37

† Co-champions

== Head coaches ==
List of Georgia Tech head coaches.

- Ernest West (1892)
- Frank O. Spain and Leonard Wood (1893–1894)
- No team (1895)
- No coach (1896–1897)
- Rufus B. Nalley (1898)
- Harris T. Collier (1899–1900)
- Cyrus W. Strickler (1901)
- John McKee (1902–1903)
- John Heisman (1904–1919)
- William Alexander (1920–1944)
- Bobby Dodd (1945–1966)
- Bud Carson (1967–1971)
- Bill Fulcher (1972–1973)
- Pepper Rodgers (1974–1979)
- Bill Curry (1980–1986)
- Bobby Ross (1987–1991)
- Bill Lewis (1992–1994)
- George O'Leary (1994–2001)
- Mac McWhorter † (2001)
- Chan Gailey (2002–2007)
- Jon Tenuta † (2007)
- Paul Johnson (2008–2018)
- Geoff Collins (2019–2022)
- Brent Key (2022–Present)

† Interim

== Bowl games ==
Georgia Tech has appeared in 48 bowl games and compiled a record of 26–22. Georgia Tech's first four bowl game appearances, the Rose Bowl (1929), Orange Bowl (1940), Cotton Bowl Classic (1943), and Sugar Bowl (1944), marked the first time a team had competed in all four of the Major Bowl Games.

Year	Bowl	Coach	Opponent	Result
1928	Rose Bowl	William Alexander	California	W 8–7
1939	Orange Bowl	William Alexander	Missouri	W 21–7
1942	Cotton Bowl Classic	William Alexander	Texas	L 7–14
1943	Sugar Bowl	William Alexander	Tulsa	W 20–18
1944	Orange Bowl	William Alexander	Tulsa	L 12–26
1946	Oil Bowl	Bobby Dodd	Saint Mary's (CA)	W 41–19
1947	Orange Bowl	Bobby Dodd	Kansas	W 20–14
1951	Orange Bowl	Bobby Dodd	Baylor	W 17–14
1952	Sugar Bowl	Bobby Dodd	Ole Miss	W 24–7
1953	Sugar Bowl	Bobby Dodd	West Virginia	W 42–19
1954	Cotton Bowl Classic	Bobby Dodd	Arkansas	W 14–6
1955	Sugar Bowl	Bobby Dodd	Pittsburgh	W 7–0
1956	Gator Bowl	Bobby Dodd	Pittsburgh	W 21–14
1959	Gator Bowl	Bobby Dodd	Arkansas	L 7–14
1961	Gator Bowl	Bobby Dodd	Penn State	L 15–30
1962	Bluebonnet Bowl	Bobby Dodd	Missouri	L 10–14
1965	Gator Bowl	Bobby Dodd	Texas Tech	W 31–21
1966	Orange Bowl	Bobby Dodd	Florida	L 12–27
1970	Sun Bowl	Bud Carson	Texas Tech	W 17–9
1971	Peach Bowl	Bud Carson	Ole Miss	L 18–41
1972	Liberty Bowl	Bill Fulcher	Iowa State	W 31–30
1978	Peach Bowl	Pepper Rodgers	Purdue	L 21–41
1985	Hall of Fame Classic	Bill Curry	Michigan State	W 17–14
1990	Florida Citrus Bowl	Bobby Ross	Nebraska	W 45–21
1991	Aloha Bowl	Bobby Ross	Stanford	W 18–17
1997	Carquest Bowl	George O'Leary	West Virginia	W 35–30
1998	Gator Bowl	George O'Leary	Notre Dame	W 35–28
1999	Gator Bowl	George O'Leary	Miami	L 13–28
2000	Peach Bowl	George O'Leary	LSU	L 14–28
2001	Seattle Bowl	Mac McWhorter†	Stanford	W 24–14
2002	Silicon Valley Football Classic	Chan Gailey	Fresno State	L 21–30
2004	Humanitarian Bowl	Chan Gailey	Tulsa	W 52–10
2004	Champs Sports Bowl	Chan Gailey	Syracuse	W 51–14
2005	Emerald Bowl	Chan Gailey	Utah	L 10–38
2006	Gator Bowl	Chan Gailey	West Virginia	L 35–38
2007	Humanitarian Bowl	Jon Tenuta†	Fresno State	L 28–40
2008	Chick-fil-A Bowl	Paul Johnson	LSU	L 3–38
2009	Orange Bowl	Paul Johnson	Iowa	L 14–24
2010	Independence Bowl	Paul Johnson	Air Force	L 7–14
2011	Sun Bowl	Paul Johnson	Utah	L 27–30
2012	Sun Bowl	Paul Johnson	USC	W 21–7
2013	Music City Bowl	Paul Johnson	Ole Miss	L 17–25
2014	Orange Bowl ‡	Paul Johnson	Mississippi State	W 49–34
2016	TaxSlayer Bowl	Paul Johnson	Kentucky	W 33–18
2018	Quick Lane Bowl	Paul Johnson	Minnesota	L 10–34
2023	Gasparilla Bowl	Brent Key	UCF	W 30–17
2024	Birmingham Bowl	Brent Key	Vanderbilt	L 27–35
2025	Pop-Tarts Bowl	Brent Key	BYU	L 21–25

† Interim

‡ New Year's Six Bowl Game

== Home stadium ==
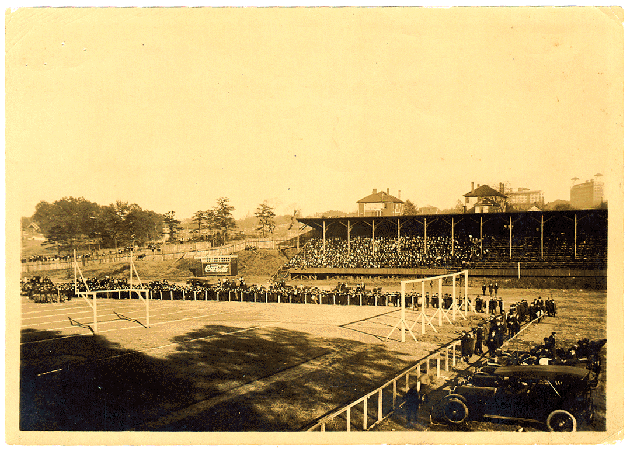
Grant Field and the east stands around 1912

The Yellow Jackets play their home games at Bobby Dodd Stadium at Hyundai Field in Atlanta, Georgia. Upon his hiring in 1904, John Heisman insisted that the Institute acquire its own football field. Grant Field was constructed to appease Heisman as well as bring a true home field advantage to Tech football.

From 1893 to 1912, the team used area parks such as Brisbane Park, Ponce de Leon Park, and Piedmont Park as the home field. Georgia Tech took out a seven-year lease on what is now the southern end of Grant Field, although the land was not adequate for sports, due to its unleveled, rocky nature. In 1905, Heisman had 300 convict laborers clear rocks, remove tree stumps, and level out the field for play; Tech students then built a grandstand on the property. The land was purchased by 1913, and John W. Grant donated $15,000 towards the construction of the field's first permanent stands; the field was named Grant Field in honor of the donor's deceased son, Hugh Inman Grant.

The stadium now sits amongst a unique urban skyline and is among the oldest Division I FBS football stadiums. In fact, the only Division I stadiums older are Franklin Field at the University of Pennsylvania and Harvard Stadium. Grant Field was natural grass until 1971. The astroturf was replaced by grass in 1995. The stadium officially holds 55,000 but has held up to 56,412 in 2005 and 56,680 in 2006.

On February 26, 2019, Georgia Tech officials unveiled plans to hold one home game per season from 2020 to 2024 (five games total) at Mercedes-Benz Stadium, located less than one mile from the Georgia Tech main campus, with the series dubbed "Mayhem at MBS". However, due to the COVID-19 pandemic, on July 30, 2020, the 2020 game against Notre Dame was moved back to Bobby Dodd Stadium and the agreement with MBS was extended to six years, running through 2026, comprising six games.

== Logos and uniforms ==
The interlocking GT logo was created in 1967 at the request of Bobby Dodd. One of the varsity players was asked to design a logo for the helmets. Several variations of the design were submitted, including a yellow jacket design. The yellow jacket was not submitted because to make the insect look mean it would have to be stinging and therefore flying backwards. The interlocking GT was selected during the summer of 1967 and formalized into decals for the helmets. Over the years it became the official logo for Georgia Tech Athletics.

When head coach Paul Johnson was hired in 2008, the Yellow Jackets adopted a new uniform style. One year later, the uniforms were altered to change the yellow to gold. A year after that, the uniforms were altered again. This time, the team adopted separate white uniforms for both home and away games, while retaining the previous styles' navy and gold jerseys for occasions when the Yellow Jackets could not wear white at home.

In 2018, after nearly 40 years of being with Russell Athletic, Georgia Tech switched to Adidas. With the change came more consistent branding across all sports and a custom shade of gold for the team as well as new uniforms that entwine progressive and traditional elements. The uniforms were updated in 2022 with a more classic look. They were then updated again in 2025 to lighten the color of the gold jersey and pants, remove navy stripes from all items, and replace the navy jersey and pants with a dark gray.

Starting on July 1st, 2026, Georgia Tech Athletics will switch from Adidas to Under Armour.

== Rivalries ==
=== Alabama ===
The Crimson Tide and the Yellow Jackets have played 52 times in a rivalry that dates back to 1902. With the exception of a four-year break during World War II (1943–1946), they squared off annually from 1922 to 1963 as members of the Southern Conference (1922–1932) and Southeastern Conference (1933–1963). The rivalry continued for one season after Georgia Tech withdrew from the SEC in 1964, then was renewed again with games in six-straight seasons from 1979 to 1984. With 52 previous meetings, Alabama is Georgia Tech's fifth-most-common all-time opponent (behind only Georgia – 114 meetings, Auburn – 92, Duke – 87 and Clemson – 85). 36 years after their last meeting, Alabama and Georgia Tech announced in January 2020 that they are set to renew the rivalry in 2030 and 2031, so by the time they meet up again, it’ll have been 46 years since the last time they played each other. Alabama leads the series 28–21–3, and the Yellow Jackets won the last matchup 16–6 in 1984.

=== Auburn ===
The Yellow Jackets have played the Auburn Tigers more than 90 times in football, and the series of football games between the two is the second-oldest in the Southeast. Auburn Univ. or A.P.I. is by far Georgia Tech's second-most-often played opponent in football. The rivalry is also intense in basketball, baseball, etc.

The first game took place on November 25, 1892, in Atlanta, Georgia. They played in the SIAA until it was defunct in 1922, before joining the Southeastern Conference. This rivalry lost some luster when the Georgia Tech Athletics discarded its membership in the Southeastern Conference in 1963 to become an independent institute. However, the Yellow Jackets continued their annual series of football games with the Auburn Tigers through 1987. Georgia Tech and Auburn play football games in occasional years, and games in other sports regularly. Even though the Yellow Jackets have joined the Atlantic Coast Conference for all sports in recent decades, from a historical perspective, the Auburn Tigers are Georgia Tech's second-highest sports rivalry, behind only the Georgia Bulldogs. Auburn leads in the all-time series 47–41–4 with the last game played in 2005.

=== Clemson ===
The Georgia Tech Yellow Jackets and the Clemson Tigers have the fourth-most-played series in Georgia Tech football history. They have been rivals since 1898 and Clemson is Tech's closest opponent, geographically, in the Atlantic Coast Conference. Also, in the ACC's new two-division arrangement, each team has one football opponent in the opposite division which has been selected as the two teams' official cross-division rival, they played every year until 2024. The Yellow Jackets and the Clemson Tigers are one of these six pairs. In addition to their geographical closeness and the Heisman connection, the Georgia Tech – Clemson pairing is also a logical one because of both schools' long history in engineering, technology, and science education. Recently, the game has become known for last-minute, extremely close finishes. From 1996 to 2001, each of the six games was decided by exactly three points.

In 1977 (before the Yellow Jackets had even joined the ACC), this football series was being considered for termination by the administration of Georgia Tech. Clemson football fans, in an effort to show their economic impact on the Atlanta, Ga., area, brought with them to Atlanta large stockpiles of two-dollar bills that were stamped with Clemson Tiger Paws. Georgia Tech leads Clemson in the all-time series 51–36–2.

=== Duke ===
The Duke Blue Devils and the Georgia Tech Yellow Jackets, located in bordering states in the southern United States, have played 92 times in a series that dates back to 1933 and every year uninterrupted until 2023. In addition to geographic proximity, prestigious academic standards throughout the universities' respective histories as well as football successes in the early 20th century contributed to the beginning of the football series with the competitiveness of the early football games between the schools helping shape the rivalry as a whole between Duke and Georgia Tech. Duke had its best years against Georgia Tech in the 1930s and 1940s, holding a 10–3 series lead over Georgia Tech after their 1945 meeting. From the start of the 1950s through the mid-1980s, the series was back and forth. Heading into the 1984 season, the series record was deadlocked at 25–25–1. But since then it has been controlled by Georgia Tech, in part due to the decline in the overall performance of Duke football in the 1990s and 2000s. In the next 36 matchups after 1984, the Jackets earned 26 victories while the Blue Devils won just ten. The series was played annually as a non-conference matchup for the first fifty years of the rivalry until Georgia Tech joined the Atlantic Coast Conference (ACC) in 1983.

When the ACC split into non-geographical divisions in 2005, the Blue Devils and Yellow Jackets were both placed in the league's "Coastal" division which guaranteed an annual meeting on the football field. Duke is Georgia Tech's third-most common opponent all-time (behind only Georgia and Auburn). Georgia Tech leads the series 56–35–1. This game decided the ACC Coastal Division champion in 2014. Although Duke won the game 31–25, they had a loss to Miami beforehand followed by losses to Virginia Tech and rival North Carolina, which allowed the Yellow Jackets to claim the division title and a trip to Charlotte for the ACC Championship as they just had 2 conference losses whereas Duke had 3. Georgia Tech won the last matchup 27–18 in Durham in 2025. When the ACC eliminated divisions in favor of a 3–5 scheduling format following the 2022 season, Duke–Georgia Tech were not designated as a protected annual football matchup and consequently became intermittent for the first time in its history; the 2023 season being the first season the teams didn't meet since 1932. The series continued in 2024 in Atlanta, 2025 in Durham and will next be played in 2026 in Atlanta. Beginning in 2023, the rivalry is occasionally missed due to the ACC's new scheduling format, not being played in 2023 and 2027 (barring a meeting in the ACC Championship Game).

=== Georgia ===
Georgia Tech's and the Georgia Bulldogs maintain a longstanding rivalry since 1893, known as Clean, Old-Fashioned Hate (COFH). with the perennial catch-phrase for Georgia Tech fans being the "To Hell With Georgia [sic]". Georgia Tech and Georgia have played each other in football over 100 times, in addition to numerous contests in other sports. Their annual football game is considered one of the most prominent events on both teams’ schedules, with the winner receiving the Governor’s Cup. Through the 2025 season, Georgia Tech trails Georgia in the all-time series 73–41–5.

=== Tennessee ===
Georgia Tech and Tennessee hadn't met since 1987 until losing a heart breaking Labor Day game in Atlanta in 2017 that renewed the rivalry between the two. When Georgia Tech was part of the Southeastern Conference they played annually. After Georgia Tech left the SEC in 1964, the teams still met until 1987. The series dates back to 1902 and Tennessee leads the series 26–17–2 with the last game played in the 2026 season.

=== Vanderbilt ===
The Yellow Jackets and the Vanderbilt Commodores first met in 1892 in Atlanta, Georgia with Vanderbilt winning 20–10. Since 1924, the winning team in the series has received a silver-plated cowbell with the year and final score of each game engraved on it. The trophy was created by Ed F. Cavaleri was described by the Atlanta Constitution as “a faithful Georgia Tech supporter though he did not attend the Jacket institution,” according to Georgia Tech's website. Cavaleri purchased a cowbell at an Atlanta hardware store to use as a noise-maker while on his way to a game in 1924. The Commodores defeated Georgia Tech 3–0, however another fan in attendance suggested that Cavaleri award the bell to the winning team. The tradition was born and Cavaleri attended every game between the two teams from 1924 to 1967. The cowbell has a gold plate screwed into each side, with “GEORGIA TECH-VANDERBILT FOOTBALL TROPHY” inscribed at the top. Three columns list the year of each game, Georgia Tech's points scored and Vanderbilt's points scored. The results of the games from 1924 to 1967 are engraved on one side; the results from 2002, 2003, 2009 and 2016 are on the other. Georgia Tech is 20–16–3 against Vanderbilt in 39 games. The Commodores won the last matchup 35–27 in the 2024 Birmingham Bowl.

=== Virginia Tech ===
The rivalry with Virginia Tech has grown considerably since Virginia Tech entered the ACC. In previous years, the teams played infrequently. The intra-conference game has often seen both teams ranked and the outcome has played a key part in determining the winner of the ACC Coastal Division. For several seasons after the ACC switched to Division format in 2005, the winner of this game also won the Coastal Division. Dubbed the Battle of the Techs, the game has seen some very close, very intense match-ups.

Virginia Tech leads the series 12–9.

== Significant series ==
=== North Carolina ===
The two southern universities in bordering states first met on the football field on October 30, 1915; the Yellow Jackets won 23–3. The teams met sporadically during the first half of the 20th century before, in 1980, the annual series began. Until the Atlantic Coast Conference (ACC) abolished divisional play in 2023, the teams met every year since 1980 except for 2020, when the game was canceled due to the COVID-19 pandemic. The series became a conference rivalry when GT joined the ACC in 1983. When the ACC split into divisions in 2005, both GT and UNC were placed in the league's Coastal division, thereby ensuring an annual meeting between the rivals. In 2022, it was announced that the ACC would do away with divisions beginning with the 2023 season. This means the Yellow Jackets and Tar Heels will meet on a rotating basis, although the teams did meet during the 2023 and 2024 regular seasons. The teams could also meet in the ACC Championship Game.

=== Notre Dame ===
This series began in 1922. The Fighting Irish were a longtime rival of the Yellow Jackets and the two teams met periodically on an annual basis over the years, particularly from 1963 to 1981 when both schools were independents following Tech's departure from the Southeastern Conference. The 1975 Georgia Tech-Notre Dame game marked the sole appearance in an Irish uniform of Rudy Ruettiger, the subject of the film Rudy. When Georgia Tech joined the Atlantic Coast Conference beginning in 1982, they were forced to end the series after 1981 because of scheduling difficulties. Consequently, the two teams have met very infrequently since then. Georgia Tech was the opponent in the inaugural game in the newly expanded Notre Dame Stadium in 1997, then a year later they met again in the Gator Bowl. The Fighting Irish and Yellow Jackets met in the 2006 and 2007 season openers and split both games. The rivalry resumed in 2015 with a 30–22 Irish win in South Bend, and will continue on a semi-regular basis as Georgia Tech and Notre Dame are scheduled to face off five times in the next ten years starting in 2020. Notre Dame is played Georgia Tech at Mercedes-Benz Stadium in 2024, beating Tech 31–13. Georgia Tech traveled to South Bend in 2021, and is set to return for the next contest again Notre Dame in 2027. Notre Dame leads the series 29–6–1.

=== Tulane ===
The Yellow Jackets and the Tulane Green Wave first met on November 4, 1916, in Atlanta, Georgia. Tulane was the opponent at Bobby Dodd Stadium for the Jackets’ first-ever televised football game — a 13–7 win over the Green Wave on WSB-TV on Oct. 2, 1948. Tulane is the seventh-most frequent opponent for Georgia Tech (50 meetings). Tulane and Georgia Tech spent most of their athletic histories as members of the same conference: they were among the first to join the SIAA in 1894 then Georgia Tech left in 1921 and Tulane in 1922 to join the Southern Conference. Both schools moved yet again in 1932 to charter the Southeastern Conference, of which they were members until Tech's departure in 1963 to become independent. Tulane followed suit in 1966, but they played each other yearly until 1982. Georgia Tech is now a member of the Atlantic Coast Conference, while Tulane is a member of the American Athletic Conference. The rivalry was renewed on September 6, 2014, in the first football game played on Tulane's campus since Tulane Stadium was torn down in 1980. Georgia Tech leads the series 37–13. The Yellow Jackets won the last matchup 65–10 in 2015.

== Traditions ==
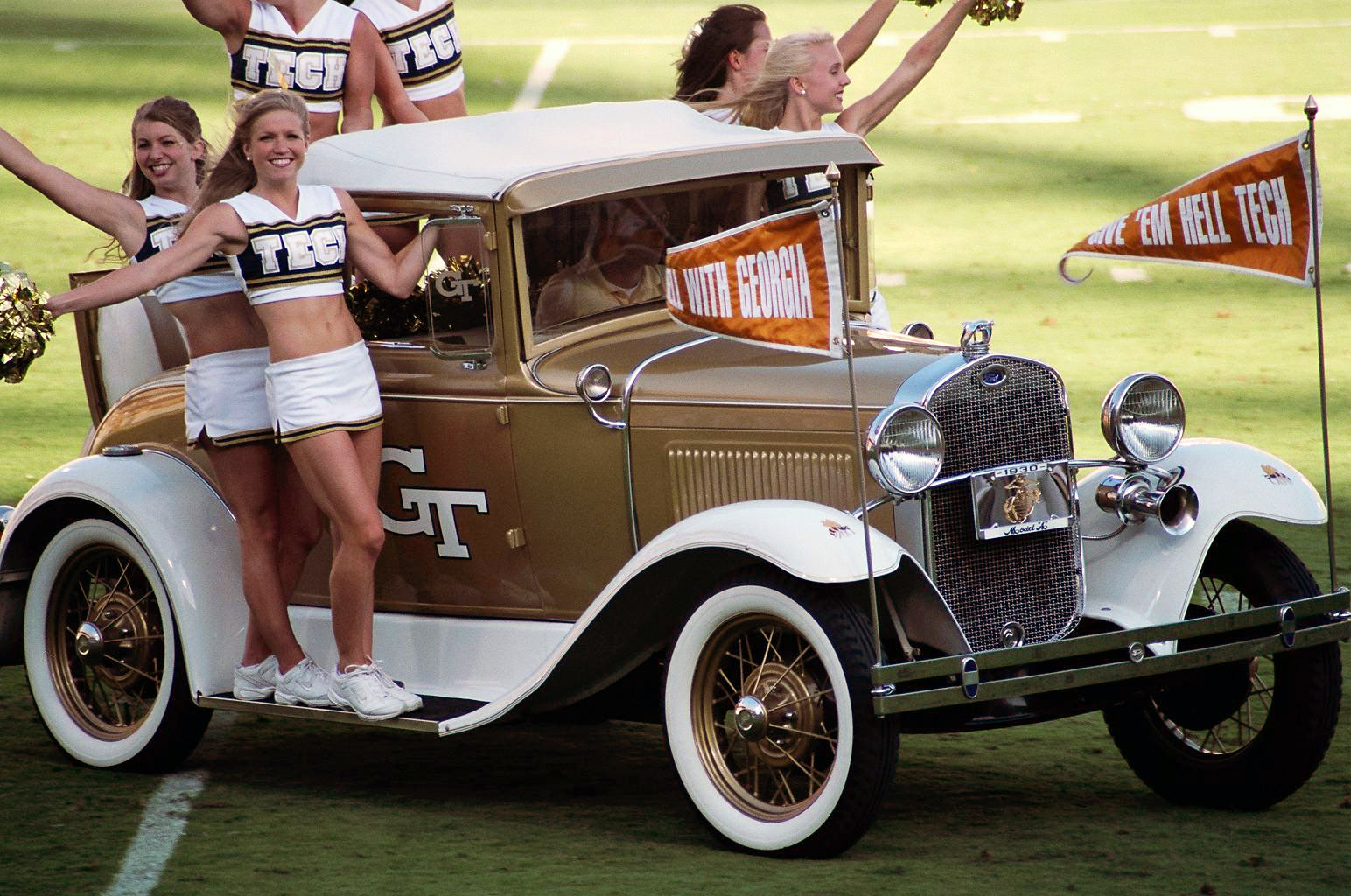
The Ramblin' Reck during a football game.

- Colors – Georgia Tech football features old gold and white uniforms with old gold helmets. Navy blue and black have been used as alternate jerseys. In 2006, Georgia Tech featured a throwback jersey based on Bud Carson-era uniforms. The jerseys were mustard gold and the helmets were white.
- Songs – The fight songs for Georgia Tech are "Ramblin' Wreck from Georgia Tech" and "Up With the White and Gold". If Georgia Tech scores a touchdown, then both songs are played, with Up With the White and Gold being played after the Yellow Jackets score and Ramblin' Wreck from Georgia Tech being played after the PAT is kicked. If Georgia Tech only kicks a field goal, "Ramblin' Wreck" is played. For some big plays, a shortened version of either song is played.
- Nicknames – Georgia Tech football teams have had several nicknames over the years including the "Blacksmiths", the "Engineers", the "Golden Tornado", or just the "Techs". Officially, the teams are called the "Yellow Jackets" or the "Ramblin' Wreck".
- Mascots – The "Ramblin' Reck" and the yellow jacket "Buzz" are the mascots of Georgia Tech football. The "Ramblin' Reck" is a 1930 Ford Model A Sports Coupe, and it has led the football team onto Grant Field in every game from September 30, 1961, to September 6, 2025. "Buzz" began pacing the sidelines of Grant Field as a mischievous anthropomorphized yellow jacket during the 1970s. "Buzz" was ranked the number three top mascot in all of college football by "America's Best" and the "Top Ten" Web site.
- Yellow Jacket Alley – "Yellow Jacket Alley" is an event staged before every game. It is a players' walk in which the team and coaches walk from the buses to the stadium, and the fans surround and cheer the walking players.
- Steam Whistle – An industrial steam whistle has been present on Georgia Tech's campus ever since the early industrial shop years. It typically was blown for the change of classes at five minutes before the hour. On football game days, the whistle is blown after every Yellow Jackets' score, and again after every Yellow Jackets' victory.
- Student Section – The student sections for the Yellow Jackets' home football games are primarily located in the North and South End Zones of Grant Field. Until the 2011 season, Flash Card displays were performed by the student section every football season since 1957. A semi-official student cheering section called the "Swarm" is located in the North End Zone adjacent to the marching band. The Swarm began in 1996. In the south end zone there's the Goldfellas, a group of students who paints their whole body gold and sits in the first row behind the south goalpost at every home game.
- RAT Caps - Incoming Georgia Tech freshmen are referred to as RATs, which stands for Recruits At Tech, although in recent years the Student Government has begun incorrectly using Recently Acquired Tech Students. A RAT is encouraged to wear the gold-colored beanie cap with the front bill worn turned up and bearing the student's name, hometown, major, class year, and the letters "RAT". A RAT should record the scores of each football game on the sides of their RAT Cap, written right side up for victories, upside down for losses, and sideways for ties. A RAT should write the "Good Word" on their caps: "To HELL with Georgia". It is the responsibility of a RAT to know the fight songs, the Alma Mater, all of the cheers, and the "Good Word". Before ACC conference regulations prohibited the practice, upperclassmen ordered "RATs on the field" before each home game, and RATs would line up in the end zone along both sides of the entryway from the locker room forming an alleyway for the Ramblin' Reck to drive through leading the team out onto the field. The ACC forced an end to this tradition after the 1980 season. The RAT cap tradition is most strictly observed by members of the marching band.
- Marching Band - Even though Georgia Tech is a high-ranking Institute of Technology, and not a college of the arts and humanities, it still fields a 300+ member marching band at all home football games and Bowl Games. A smaller Pep Band attends road games which the full band doesn't attend. Among other songs, the Yellow Jacket Marching Band always plays the Georgia Tech fight songs and the Alma Mater, and in addition, it plays "When You Say Budweiser, You've Said It All" at the completion of the third quarter.

== Individual achievements ==
=== Heisman Trophy finalists ===
Georgia Tech has had several players receive votes in the Heisman Trophy balloting. Eddie Prokop finished fifth in the 1943 Heisman voting, Lenny Snow was fourteenth in 1966, Eddie Lee Ivery was eighth in 1978, and both Calvin Johnson and Haynes King were tenth in 2006 and 2025 respectively. Billy Lothridge is the only Tech player to receive votes in multiple years. He was eighth in 1962 and runner-up in 1963. Clint Castleberry was the only freshman in the history of the Heisman to finish as high as third until Herschel Walker's third-place finish in 1980. Castleberry and Walker, however, were both surpassed in 2004 by true freshman Adrian Peterson's Heisman runner-up season. Joe Hamilton tied Lothridge's runner-up status in 1999.

Year	Name	Position	Finish
1942	Clint Castleberry	HB	3rd
1943	Eddie Prokop	QB	5th
1963	Billy Lothridge	QB	2nd
1978	Eddie Lee Ivery	RB	8th
1999	Joe Hamilton	QB	2nd
2006	Calvin Johnson	WR	10th
2025	Haynes King	QB	10th

=== All-Americans ===
Georgia Tech has fielded 50 First Team All-Americans. The first All-Americans at Tech were Walker Carpenter and Everett Strupper in 1917 while the most recent were Durant Brooks in 2007, Michael Johnson in 2008, Derrick Morgan in 2009, and Shaquille Mason in 2014.

Name	Position	Selected	Hometown
Maxie Baughan	C	1959	Bessemer, Alabama
Ray Beck	G	1951	Cedartown, Georgia
Don Bessillieu	DB	1978	Decatur, Georgia
Jim Breland	C	1966	Blacksburg, Virginia
George Broadnax	E	1948	Atlanta
Durant Brooks	P	2007	Macon, Georgia
Chris Brown	T	2000	Augusta, Georgia
Pete Brown	OC	1952	Rossville, Georgia
Gerry Bussell	DB	1964	Jacksonville, Florida
Walker Carpenter	T	1917	Newnan, Georgia
Marco Coleman	OLB	1990	Dayton, Ohio
Bobby Davis	T	1947	Columbus, Georgia
John Davis	T	1985	Ellijay, Georgia
A.M. Day	C	1918	–
Paul Duke	C	1946	Atlanta
Bill Fincher	E	1918, 1920	–
Smylie Gebhart	DE	1971	Meridian, Mississippi
Rufus Guthrie	G	1962	Atlanta
Joe Guyon	T, HB	1918	White Earth, Minnesota
Joe Hamilton	QB	1999	Alvin, South Carolina
Leon Hardeman	HB	1952	LaFayette, Georgia
Harvey Hardy	G	1942	Marion, Alabama
Pressley Harvin III	P	2020	Alcolu, South Carolina
Bill Healy	DG	1948	–
Robert Ison	E	1939	–
Calvin Johnson	WR	2005, 2006	Tyrone, Georgia
Michael Johnson	DE	2008	Selma, Alabama
Billy Lothridge	QB	1963	Gainesville, Georgia
Billy Martin	E	1963	Gainesville, Georgia
Buck Martin	E	1952	Haleyville, Alabama
Shaquille Mason	OG	2014	Columbia, Tennessee
Hal Miller	OT	1952	Kingsport, Tennessee
Warner Mizell	HB	1928	–
Derrick Morgan	DE	2009	Coatesville, Pennsylvania
Bobby Moorhead	DB	1952	Miami, Florida
George Morris	LB	1952	Vicksburg, Mississippi
Larry Morris	C	1953	Decatur, Georgia
Craig Page	C	1998	Jupiter, Florida
Rock Perdoni	DT	1970	Wellesley, Massachusetts
Peter Pund	C	1928	Augusta, Georgia
Randy Rhino	DB	1972	Charlotte, North Carolina
Coleman Rudolph	DT	1992	Valdosta, Georgia
Lucius Sanford	LB	1977	Atlanta
Scott Sisson	K	1992	Marietta, Georgia
Lenny Snow	TB	1966	Daytona Beach, Florida
Frank Speer	T	1928	Atlanta
John Steber	G	1943	–
Don Stephenson	C	1956	Bessemer, Alabama
Everett Strupper	HB	1917	Columbus, Georgia
Ken Swilling	FS	1990	Toccoa, Georgia
Pat Swilling	DE	1985	Toccoa, Georgia
Phil Tinsley	E	1944	Bessemer, Alabama
Lamar Wheat	DT	1951	Chattanooga, Tennessee

=== Position award winners ===
Four Georgia Tech players have been awarded the highest collegiate award possible for their position. Joe Hamilton won the Davey O'Brien Award after his senior season in 1999, Calvin Johnson won the Fred Biletnikoff Award after his junior season in 2006, and Durant Brooks and Pressley Harvin III won the Ray Guy Award in 2007 and 2020 respectively. Hamilton and Johnson were the only Georgia Tech players to be named ACC Player of the Year until Jonathan Dwyer received the honor in 2008 and Haynes King in 2025.

Name	Award	Year
Joe Hamilton	O'Brien	1999
Calvin Johnson	Biletnikoff	2006
Durant Brooks	Ray Guy	2007
Pressley Harvin III	Ray Guy	2020

=== Post-collegiate accolades ===
==== College Football Hall of Fame ====
Georgia Tech has had four coaches and 14 players inducted into the College Football Hall of Fame just down the street in Atlanta. Coaches Heisman, Alexander, Dodd, and Johnson were inducted in the 1954, 1951, 1993, and 2023 classes respectively.

Name	Position	Played	Inducted
Maxie Baughan	C	1957–1959	1988
Ray Beck	G	1948–1951	1997
Bobby Davis	T	1944–1947	1978
Bill Fincher	E, T	1916–1920	1974
Buck Flowers	HB	1918–1920	1955
Joe Guyon	HB, T	1917–1918	1971
Joe Hamilton	QB	1996–1999	2014
Calvin Johnson	WR	2004–2006	2018
George Morris	C	1950–1952	1981
Larry Morris	C	1951–1954	1992
Peter Pund	C	1926–1928	1963
Randy Rhino	S	1972–1974	2002
Everett Strupper	HB	1915–1917	1972
Pat Swilling	DE	1982–1985	2009

==== NFL draft ====
Georgia Tech has over 150 alumni that have played in the National Football League. Tech has had ten players selected in the first round of the NFL draft since its inception in 1937. The first Georgia Tech player ever to be drafted was Middleton Fitzsimmons in 1937. He was drafted 2nd in the 10th round by the Chicago Bears. The first Tech player selected in the first round was Eddie Prokop in 1945 and the most recent first round Yellow Jacket was Keylan Rutledge in 2026.

First round draft picks

Name	Position	Year	Overall pick	Team
Eddie Prokop	QB	1945	4	Boston Yanks
Larry Morris	LB	1955	7	L.A. Rams
Rufus Guthrie	OG	1963	10	L.A. Rams
Kent Hill	OG	1979	26	L.A. Rams
Eddie Lee Ivery	RB	1979	15	Green Bay Packers
Marco Coleman	DE	1992	12	Miami Dolphins
Keith Brooking	LB	1998	12	Atlanta Falcons
Calvin Johnson	WR	2007	2	Detroit Lions
Demaryius Thomas	WR	2010	22	Denver Broncos
Derrick Morgan	DE	2010	16	Tennessee Titans
Keylan Rutledge	OG	2026	26	Houston Texans

==== Pro Football Hall of Fame ====
Three Yellow Jackets have been inducted into the Pro Football Hall of Fame. Joe Guyon played professional football from 1920 to 1927. Guyon was a collegiate teammate of Jim Thorpe at Carlisle Indian Industrial School before transferring to Georgia Tech. His playing career began with the Canton Bulldogs and finished with the New York Giants. He was inducted into the Hall of Fame in the class of 1966. Billy Shaw played professional football for the Buffalo Bills from 1961 to 1969. He was inducted into the Hall of Fame in the class of 1999. Calvin Johnson played for the Detroit Lions from 2007 to 2015. He was inducted into the Hall of Fame in the class of 2021, his first year of eligibility.

Name	Position	Played	Inducted
Joe Guyon	HB, T	1920–1927	1966
Billy Shaw	OG	1961–1969	1999
Calvin Johnson	WR	2007–2015	2021

=== Retired numbers ===
No.	Player	Pos.	Tenure	Year retired	Ref.
19	Clint Castleberry	HB	1942		

== Future opponents ==
Announced schedules as of September 30, 2026. With the ACC announcing a 17-team schedule, Georgia Tech plays the following games with no annual rival. Georgia Tech plays each team in the ACC at minimum once every 4 years.

Year	Non-conference opponents				Home ACC games					Away ACC games			
2027	at Tennessee (8/28)	vs. Hampton (10/9)	vs. Georgia (11/27)		vs. California	vs. Pittsburgh	vs. Virginia	vs. Virginia Tech	at Boston College	at Florida State	at Miami (FL)	at Southern Methodist	at Wake Forest
2028	vs. Arkansas State (9/2)		vs. Mercer (11/18)	at Georgia (11/25)	vs. Clemson	vs. Pittsburgh	vs. Southern Methodist	vs. Stanford	at California	at Duke	at Louisville	at Virginia	
2029			at Notre Dame (11/3)	vs. Georgia (11/24)	vs. Florida State	vs. Louisville	vs. Virginia	vs. Virginia Tech	at Boston College	at Clemson	at Southern Methodist	at Wake Forest	
2030	vs Alabama (8/31)			at Georgia (11/30)	vs. Boston College	vs. California	vs. Southern Methodist	vs. Wake Forest	at Louisville	at Miami (FL)	at Stanford	at Syracuse	
2031	at Alabama (8/30)			vs. Georgia (11/29)									
2032			vs. Notre Dame (10/30)	at Georgia (11/27)									
2033				vs. Georgia (11/26)									
2034				at Georgia (11/25)									
2035				vs. Georgia (11/24)									
2036			vs. Notre Dame (9/27)	at Georgia (11/29)									
2037				vs. Georgia (11/28)									

== Bibliography ==
- McMath, Robert C.; Bayor, Ronald H.; Brittain, James E.; Foster, Lawrence; Giebelhaus, August W.; Reed, Germaine M. (1985). Engineering the New South: Georgia Tech 1885–1985. Athens, Georgia: University of Georgia Press.
- Wallace, Robert (1969). Dress Her in WHITE and GOLD: A biography of Georgia Tech. Georgia Tech Foundation.
