= 1998 Georgia Tech Yellow Jackets football team =

American college football season

1998 Georgia Tech Yellow Jackets football

ACC co-champion Gator Bowl champion

Gator Bowl, W 35–28 vs. Notre Dame
- Conference: Atlantic Coast Conference

Ranking
- Coaches: No. 11
- AP: No. 9
- Record: 10–2 (7–1 ACC)
- Head coach: George O'Leary (5th season)
- Offensive coordinator: Ralph Friedgen (7th season)
- Defensive coordinator: Randy Edsall (1st season)
- Home stadium: Bobby Dodd Stadium

1998 Atlantic Coast Conference football standings
	Conf.			Overall
Team	W		L	W		L
No. 3 Florida State $+	7	–	1	11	–	2
No. 9 Georgia Tech +	7	–	1	10	–	2
No. 18 Virginia	6	–	2	9	–	3
North Carolina	5	–	3	7	–	5
NC State	5	–	3	7	–	5
Duke	2	–	6	4	–	7
Wake Forest	2	–	6	3	–	8
Clemson	1	–	7	3	–	8
Maryland	1	–	7	3	–	8
$ – BCS representative as conference champion; + – Conference co-champions; Rankings from AP Poll

The 1998 Georgia Tech Yellow Jackets football team was an American football team that represented Georgia Tech as a member of the Atlantic Coast Conference during the 1998 NCAA Division I-A football season. In their fifth year under head coach George O'Leary, the team compiled a 10–2 record, with a conference record of 7–1, sharing the ACC title with Florida State. Georgia Tech was invited to the Gator Bowl, where the Yellow Jackets defeated Notre Dame. The team played home games at Bobby Dodd Stadium in Atlanta.

== Schedule ==
Date	Time	Opponent	Rank	Site	TV	Result	Attendance	Source
September 5	3:30 pm	Boston College*		Bobby Dodd Stadium; Atlanta, GA	ABC	L 31–41	38,229	
September 12	7:00 pm	New Mexico State*		Bobby Dodd Stadium; Atlanta, GA		W 42–7	36,382	
September 26	7:30 pm	at North Carolina		Kenan Memorial Stadium; Chapel Hill, NC	ESPN	W 43–21	59,500	
October 3	12:00 pm	Duke		Bobby Dodd Stadium; Atlanta, GA	JPS	W 41–13	35,724	
October 10	3:30 pm	at No. 23 NC State		Carter–Finley Stadium; Raleigh, NC	ABC	W 47–24	48,600	
October 17	3:30 pm	No. 7 Virginia	No. 25	Bobby Dodd Stadium; Atlanta, GA	ABC	W 41–38	46,018	
October 24	7:00 pm	No. 6 Florida State	No. 20	Bobby Dodd Stadium; Atlanta, GA (College GameDay)	ESPN	L 7–34	46,362	
October 31	12:00 pm	vs. Maryland	No. 23	Ravens Stadium at Camden Yards; Baltimore, MD	JPS	W 31–14	25,183	
November 12	8:00 pm	at Clemson	No. 22	Memorial Stadium; Clemson, SC (rivalry)	ESPN	W 24–21	62,012	
November 21	1:00 pm	Wake Forest	No. 21	Bobby Dodd Stadium; Atlanta, GA		W 63–35	40,110	
November 28	12:00 pm	at No. 12 Georgia*	No. 17	Sanford Stadium; Athens, GA (Clean, Old-Fashioned Hate)	CBS	W 21–19	86,117	
January 1	12:30 pm	vs. No. 17 Notre Dame*	No. 12	Alltel Stadium; Jacksonville, FL (Gator Bowl, rivalry)	NBC	W 35–28	70,791	
*Non-conference game; Rankings from AP Poll released prior to the game; All times are in Eastern time

== Rankings ==
Ranking movements Legend: ██ Increase in ranking ██ Decrease in ranking — = Not ranked RV = Received votes
	Week															
Poll	Pre	1	2	3	4	5	6	7	8	9	10	11	12	13	14	Final
AP	RV	—	—	—	RV	RV	25	20	23	23	22	21	17	12	12	9
Coaches Poll	RV	—	—	—	RV	RV	25	19	24	24	23	21	18	14	14	11
BCS	Not released								17	—	—	22	19	12	14	Not released
