= 1999 Gator Bowl =

1999 Toyota Gator Bowl
- 54th Gator Bowl
Georgia Tech Yellow Jackets	Notre Dame Fighting Irish
(9-2)	(9–2)
ACC	Independent
35	28
Head coach: George O'Leary	Head coach: Bob Davie
AP 12	AP 17
	1	2	3	4	Total
Georgia Tech	7	14	7	7	35
Notre Dame	7	0	13	8	28
- Date: January 1, 1999
- Season: 1998
- Stadium: Alltel Stadium
- Location: Jacksonville, Florida
- MVP: WR Dez White (Georgia Tech); QB Joe Hamilton (Georgia Tech); RB Autry Denson (Notre Dame)
- Referee: Ken Flaherty (WAC)
- Attendance: 70,791

United States TV coverage
- Network: NBC

The 1999 Gator Bowl was a post-season American college football bowl game between the Georgia Tech Yellow Jackets and the Notre Dame Fighting Irish played at Alltel Stadium in Jacksonville, Florida, on January 1, 1999. For sponsorship reasons, the game was officially named the 1999 Toyota Gator Bowl. The game was the final contest of the 1998 NCAA Division I-A football season for both teams, the 54th edition of the annual Gator Bowl game, and ended in a 35–28 victory for Georgia Tech.

Both Georgia Tech and Notre Dame each entered the bowl hoping to boost their season win total to double digits. This matchup pitted two top-20 teams against each other on New Year's Day. Georgia Tech's Dez White led the Yellow Jacket's offensive charge with 129 receiving yards and two touchdowns. White would be named Most Valuable Player along with his quarterback, Joe Hamilton. Hamilton also had an impressive performance, and ended the season on a high note to be carried into the following season. After a hard-fought game, Georgia Tech edged out Notre Dame to boost their season win total to ten.

== Background ==
Georgia Tech were co-champions in the Atlantic Coast Conference with a loss to Florida State costing them a Bowl Championship Series spot. This was Georgia Tech's fifth Gator Bowl and first since 1965.

The Irish were 1–1 before going on an 8-game winning streak that made them ranked number 9, until a loss to USC in the last game of the season as they tried to break their losing streak in bowl games, which was at three. This was Notre Dame's first Gator Bowl since 1976.

== Game summary ==
Wearing their green uniforms for the first time since the 1995 Fiesta Bowl, the Irish hoped to have luck on their side. But as it turned out, their defense gave the Yellow Jackets luck, allowing five long drives for touchdowns and 436 yards. Joe Burns would throw a touchdown pass to Joe Hamilton to start off the scoring for GT, though Autry Denson responded with a touchdown run. But the Yellow Jackets scored 14 unanswered points in the second quarter, with a Phillip Rogers touchdown run and a Mike Sheridan touchdown catch from Hamilton, as they had a 21–7 halftime lead. The Irish responded with two rushing touchdowns from Jarious Jackson and Denson, but they still trailed 21–20 due to a blocked extra point. Dez White made the lead 8 with his touchdown catch from Hamilton to make it 28–20 as the third quarter ended. Notre Dame tied the game with an Autry Denson touchdown run and the successful conversion pass from Jackson. Georgia Tech took the lead for the final time with a Dez White touchdown pass from Hamilton. With less than three minutes remaining, Notre Dame tried to drive to tie the game; Jackson was tackled by Nate Simson, who forced a fumble that was recovered by Jesse Tarplin as the Yellow Jackets won their fifth bowl game appearance. For GT, Hamilton went 13 of 20 for 237 yards and two touchdowns, and White caught 4 passes, but for 129 yards and two touchdowns. For Notre Dame, Denson rushed 26 times for 130 yards.

== Aftermath ==
Georgia Tech would return to the Gator Bowl the next year. Notre Dame would return in 2003, though they would have to wait until 2008 to win a bowl game.

== Statistics ==
Statistics	GT	ND
First downs	23	20
Yards rushing	205	194
Yards passing	242	150
Return yards	42	8
Total yards	436	309
Punts-Average	3-34.7	5-36.6
Fumbles-Lost	2-1	2-1
Penalties-Yards	7-53	6-30
