= December 2008 in sports =

<<	December 2008					>>
Su	Mo	Tu	We	Th	Fr	Sa
	1	2	3	4	5	6
7	8	9	10	11	12	13
14	15	16	17	18	19	20
21	22	23	24	25	26	27
28	29	30	31
Sports

This list shows notable sports-related deaths, events, and notable outcomes that occurred in December of 2008.

== Deaths ==
- 1: Tom Kirby
- 4: Steve Bradley
- 5: Martyn Crook
- 8: Xavier Perrot
- 8: Kerryn McCann
- 8: John Cumming
- 8: Manzoor Hussain Atif
- 9: Dražan Jerković
- 9: Ibrahim Dossey
- 10: Sal Yvars
- 12: Maksym Pashayev
- 13: John Drake
- 13: Vince Karalius
- 14: Hank Goldup
- 14: Nick Willhite
- 15: Mike Blum
- 16: Joe Krol
- 17: Sammy Baugh
- 17: Dave Smith
- 17: Justin Levens
- 18: Robert Jonquet
- 18: Pete Case
- 19: Dock Ellis
- 19: Matt Kofler
- 19: Sam Tingle
- 21: Ron Hornaday Sr.
- 21: Carlos Manuel Santiago
- 21: Maurice Zilber
- 22: Coy Bacon
- 22: Norm Cook
- 22: Ossie Dawson
- 22: Hugh Myers
- 23: Narciso Bernardo
- 24: Ian Ballinger
- 24: Ray Deakin
- 27: Arild Andresen
- 27: Sailor Brown
- 27: Sahu Mewalal
- 27: George Miller
- 27: Alfred Pfaff
- 31: Premjit Lall

== Current sporting seasons ==
=== American football 2008 ===
- NFL
  - Playoffs
- NCAA Division I FBS
  - Bowl games

=== Auto racing 2008 ===
- A1 Grand Prix
- GP2 Asia Series
- Speedcar Series

=== Basketball 2008–09 ===
- NBA
- Euroleague
- NCAA men
- NCAA women
- Philippines
  - Philippine Cup

=== Football (soccer) ===
- 2008–09
  - England
  - Germany
  - Italy
  - Spain
  - France
  - Argentina
  - UEFA (Europe) Champions League
  - UEFA Cup
  - 2010 FIFA World Cup Qualifying

=== Golf 2009 ===
- European Tour

=== Ice hockey 2008–09 ===
- National Hockey League
- Champions Hockey League
- Kontinental Hockey League

=== Rugby union 2008–09 ===
- Heineken Cup
- English Premiership
- Celtic League
- Top 14

=== Winter sports ===
- Alpine Skiing World Cup
- Biathlon World Cup
- Bobsleigh World Cup
- Cross-Country Skiing World Cup
- Freestyle Skiing World Cup
- Luge World Cup
- Nordic Combined World Cup
- Short Track Speed Skating World Cup
- Skeleton World Cup
- Ski Jumping World Cup
- Snowboard World Cup
- Speed Skating World Cup

== December 31, 2008 (Wednesday) ==
=== American football ===
- NCAA Bowl Games:
  - Armed Forces Bowl: Houston 34, Air Force 28
  - Sun Bowl: Oregon State 3, (20) Pittsburgh 0
  - Music City Bowl: Vanderbilt 16, (24) Boston College 14
    - Vandy wins in front of their hometown fans 53 years to the day after the Commodores' last bowl win.
  - Insight Bowl: Kansas 42, Minnesota 21
  - Chick-fil-A Bowl: LSU 38, (14) Georgia Tech 3
- NFL News:
  - New England Patriots linebacker Jerod Mayo is named 2008 NFL Defensive Rookie of the Year.

=== Cricket ===
- Sri Lanka in Bangladesh:
  - 1st Test in Dhaka, day 5:
    - Sri Lanka 293 and 405/6d; Bangladesh 178 and 413 (Mohammad Ashraful 101, Shakib Al Hasan 96). **Sri Lanka win by 107 runs and lead 2-match series 1–0**.
- West Indies in New Zealand:
  - 1st ODI in Queenstown:
    - West Indies 129/5 (Ramnaresh Sarwan 38, Tim Southee 2/33). **No result as rain stopped play. Five-match series tied at 0–0.**

=== Ice hockey ===
- World Junior Championships in Ottawa, Ontario, Canada
  (teams in **bold** advance to the semifinals, teams in italics advance to the quarterfinals)
  - Group A (at Scotiabank Place):
    - Czech Republic 10–2 Kazakhstan
    - **Canada** 7–4 United States
    - Idle: Germany
  - Group B (at the Ottawa Civic Centre):
    - **Sweden** 5–0 Russia
    - Slovakia 3–2 Finland (SO)
    - Idle: Latvia

=== Winter sports ===
==== Cross-country skiing ====
- Tour de Ski, stage 4 in Nové Město, Czech Republic:
  - 15 km classic men: (1) Axel Teichmann (Germany) 39 min 03.7 sec (2) Martin Johnsrud Sundby (Norway) 39:08.7 (3) Nikolay Chebotko (Kazakhstan) 39:14.2
    - Overall standings (after four of seven stages): (1) Dario Cologna (Switzerland) 1 hr 24:36.9 (2) Vasily Rochev (Russia) 1 hr 24:53.2 (3) Teichmann 1 hr 24:53.4
  - 10 km classic women: (1) Virpi Kuitunen (Finland) 24 min 45.4 sec (2) Aino-Kaisa Saarinen (Finland) at 37.6 sec (3) Marit Bjørgen (Norway) 49.9
    - Overall standings (after four of seven stages): (1) Kuitunen 57:49.3 (2) Saarinen at 5.6 sec (3) Bjørgen 23.0

== December 30, 2008 (Tuesday) ==
=== American football ===
- NCAA Bowl Games:
  - Humanitarian Bowl: Maryland 42, Nevada 35
  - Texas Bowl: Rice 38, Western Michigan 14
    - The Owls pick up their first bowl win since 1954, and complete their first 10-win season since 1949.
  - Holiday Bowl: (17) Oregon 42, (12) Oklahoma State 31
- NFL News:
  - Atlanta Falcons quarterback Matt Ryan is named 2008 NFL Offensive Rookie of the Year.
  - The Denver Broncos fire head coach Mike Shanahan.

=== Cricket ===
- South Africa in Australia:
  - 2nd Test in Melbourne, day 5:
    - Australia 394 and 247; South Africa 459 and 183/1 (Graeme Smith 75, Nathan Hauritz 1/41). South Africa win by 9 wickets and lead three-match series 2–0 and becomes the first South African team to win a Test series in Australia.
- Sri Lanka in Bangladesh:
  - 1st Test in Dhaka, day 4:
    - Sri Lanka 293 and 405/6d (Mahela Jayawardene 166); Bangladesh 178 and 254/5 (Mohammad Ashraful 70*). Bangladesh require another 267 runs with 5 wickets remaining.

=== Ice hockey ===
- World Junior Championships in Ottawa, Ontario, Canada
  - Group A (at Scotiabank Place):
    - Czech Republic 6–0 Germany
    - United States 12–0 Kazakhstan
  - Group B (at the Ottawa Civic Centre):
    - Russia 8–1 Slovakia
    - Finland 5–1 Latvia

== December 29, 2008 (Monday) ==
=== American football ===
- NCAA Bowl Games:
  - PapaJohns.com Bowl: Rutgers 29, North Carolina State 23
  - Alamo Bowl: (20) Missouri 30, (23) Northwestern 23 (OT)
- NFL News:
  - Detroit Lions head coach Rod Marinelli is fired following the team's 0–16 season.
  - Eric Mangini is fired as New York Jets' head coach after his team missed the playoffs.
  - Romeo Crennel is fired as Cleveland Browns head coach.

=== Cricket ===
- South Africa in Australia:
  - 2nd Test in Melbourne, day 4:
    - Australia 394 and 247 (Ricky Ponting 99, Dale Steyn 5/67); South Africa 459 and 30/0. South Africa require another 153 runs with 10 wickets remaining.

=== Ice hockey ===
- World Junior Championships in Ottawa, Ontario, Canada
  - Group A (at Scotiabank Place):
    - Germany 1–5 Canada
  - Group B (at the Ottawa Civic Centre):
    - Latvia 1–10 Sweden

=== Football (soccer) ===
- News:
  - Liverpool midfielder and team captain Steven Gerrard is arrested on charges of assault after being involved in a fight at a pub following a match against Newcastle United.

=== Winter sports ===
==== Alpine skiing ====
- Women's World Cup in Semmering, Austria:
  - Slalom: (1) Maria Riesch (Germany) 1 minute 55.97 seconds (2) Tanja Poutiainen (Finland) 1:56.18 (3) Lindsey Vonn (United States) 1:56.69
    - Overall World Cup standings (after 12 races): (1) Vonn 530 pts (2) Riesch 507 (3) Poutiainen 498

==== Cross-country skiing ====
- Tour de Ski, stage 3 in Prague, Czech Republic:
  - 1 km sprint freestyle men: (1) Tor Arne Hetland (Norway) (2) Vasily Rochev (Russia) (3) Jean-Marc Gaillard (France)
    - Overall standings: (1) Dario Cologna (Switzerland) 45:01.4 (2) Rochev +15.4 (3) Gaillard +18.1
  - 1 km sprint freestyle women: (1) Arianna Follis (Italy) (2) Aino-Kaisa Saarinen (Finland) (3) Petra Majdič (Slovenia)
    - Overall standings: (1) Follis 32:23.9 (2) Saarinen +8.0 (3) Marit Bjørgen (Norway) +13.1

==== Ski jumping ====
- Four Hills Tournament:
  - World Cup in Oberstdorf, Germany:
  - Individual 137 m hill: (1) Simon Ammann (Switzerland) 286.4 pts (136.5/134.0 metres) (2) Wolfgang Loitzl (Austria) 285.2 (135.0/134.0) (3) Dimitry Vassiliev (Russia) 284.4 (134.5/136.0)
    - Overall World Cup standings (after 8 of 28 events): (1) Ammann 685 points (2) Gregor Schlierenzauer (Austria) 560 (3) Loitzl 439

== December 28, 2008 (Sunday) ==
=== American football ===
- National Football League Week 17:
  (Teams that have made playoffs are in **boldface**)
  - **Carolina Panthers** 33, New Orleans Saints 31
    - The Panthers win the NFC South title and earn a first-round bye in the NFC playoffs.
  - Houston Texans 31, Chicago Bears 24
    - The Bears loss knocks them out of the playoffs.
  - **Pittsburgh Steelers** 31, Cleveland Browns 0
    - A pyrrhic victory for the Steelers as Ben Roethlisberger is knocked out of the game with a concussion.
  - Green Bay Packers 31, Detroit Lions 21
    - The Lions earn the first 0–16 season in NFL history.
  - Cincinnati Bengals 16, Kansas City Chiefs 6
  - New England Patriots 13, Buffalo Bills 0
    - The Pats win, but are eliminated from the playoffs when the Dolphins and Ravens both win.
  - **Minnesota Vikings** 20, **New York Giants** 19
    - The Vikings win the NFC North on a Ryan Longwell walk-off 50-yard field goal, and will host Philadelphia next Sunday.
  - Oakland Raiders 31, Tampa Bay Buccaneers 24
    - The Bucs are eliminated.
  - **Atlanta Falcons** 31, St. Louis Rams 27
    - The Falcons will play in Glendale next Saturday against the Cardinals.
  - **Indianapolis Colts** 23, **Tennessee Titans** 0
  - **Philadelphia Eagles** 44, Dallas Cowboys 6
    - The Eagles earn the last NFC wild card berth thanks to sloppy play by Dallas, with five turnovers leading to 24 Eagles points.
  - **Baltimore Ravens** 27, Jacksonville Jaguars 7
    - The Ravens clinch the last AFC wild card spot.
  - **Miami Dolphins** 24, New York Jets 17
    - The Dolphins win the AFC East, and will host Baltimore next Sunday.
  - **Arizona Cardinals** 34, Seattle Seahawks 21
  - San Francisco 49ers 27, Washington Redskins 24
  - **San Diego Chargers** 52, Denver Broncos 21
    - The Chargers win the AFC West title and will host the Colts next Saturday in a wild card game.
- NCAA Bowl Games:
  - Independence Bowl: Louisiana Tech 17, Northern Illinois 10

=== Cricket ===
- South Africa in Australia:
  - 2nd Test in Melbourne, day 3:
    - Australia 394 and 4/0; South Africa 459 (Jean-Paul Duminy 166, Dale Steyn 76, Peter Siddle 4/81). Australia trail by 61 runs with 10 second innings wickets remaining.
- Sri Lanka in Bangladesh:
  - 1st Test in Dhaka, day 3:
    - Sri Lanka 293 (Thilan Samaraweera 90) and 291/4 (Mahela Jayawardene 129*); Bangladesh 178. Sri Lanka lead by 406 runs with 6 wickets remaining.
- West Indies in New Zealand:
  - 2nd T20I in Hamilton:
    - New Zealand 191/9 (Jesse Ryder 62, Brendon McCullum 59, Chris Gayle 2/27); West Indies 155/7 (Ramnaresh Sarwan 53, Jeetan Patel 2/12). **New Zealand win by 36 runs; two-match series tied 1–1.**

=== Football (soccer) ===
- ASEAN Championship:
  - Finals, second leg:
    - Vietnam 1–1 Thailand, **Vietnam win the championship 3–2 on aggregate**

=== Ice hockey ===
- World Junior Championships in Ottawa, Ontario, Canada
  - Group A (at Scotiabank Place):
    - Kazakhstan 0–15 **Canada**
    - **United States** 4–3 Czech Republic
  - Group B (at the Ottawa Civic Centre):
    - **Russia** 5–2 Finland
    - **Sweden** 3–1 Slovakia

=== Winter sports ===
==== Alpine skiing ====
- Men's World Cup in Bormio, Italy:
  - Downhill: (1) Christof Innerhofer (Italy) 2:03.55 (2) Klaus Kroll (Austria) 2:03.87 (3) Michael Walchhofer (Austria) 2:04.50
    - Overall World Cup standings (after 14 races): (1) Aksel Lund Svindal (Norway) 444 pts (2) Benjamin Raich (Austria) 393 (3) Didier Cuche (Switzerland) 379
- Women's World Cup in Semmering, Austria:
  - Giant slalom: (1) Kathrin Zettel (Austria) 2:10.90 (1:06.30+1:04.60) (2) Manuela Mölgg (Italy) 2:11.27 (1:06.09+1:05.18) (3) Lara Gut (Switzerland) 2:11.45 (1:07.36+1:04.09)
    - Overall World Cup standings (after 11 races): (1) Lindsey Vonn (United States) 470 pts (2) Tanja Poutiainen (Finland) 418 (3) Maria Riesch (Germany) 407

==== Cross-country skiing ====
- Tour de Ski, stage 2 in Oberhof, Germany:
  - 10 km pursuit classic women: (1) Virpi Kuitunen (Finland) 23 min 56.7 sec, (2) Marit Bjørgen (Norway) at 3.9 sec, (3) Aino-Kaisa Saarinen (Finland) 6.2
    - Overall standings: (1) Kuitunen 30:23.2, (2) Bjørgen at 2.2 sec, (3) Justyna Kowalczyk (Poland) 6.2
  - 15 km pursuit classic men: (1) Dario Cologna (Switzerland) 43:05.1 (2) Axel Teichmann (Germany) at 5.6 (3) Sami Jauhojärvi (Finland) 26.6
    - Overall standings: (1) Cologna 43:05.1, (2) Teichmann +4.8 (3) Devon Kershaw (Canada) +26.4

==== Nordic combined ====
- World Cup in Oberhof, Germany:
  - 10 km Gundersen: (1) Anssi Koivuranta (Finland) 27:22.2 (2nd in ski jump) (2) Todd Lodwick (United States) at 6.9 (3rd) (3) Jason Lamy-Chappuis (France) 14.8 (7th)
    - Overall standings (after eight of 24 rounds): (1) Koivuranta 543 points (2) Magnus Moan (Norway) 396 (3) Bill Demong (United States) 367

== December 27, 2008 (Saturday) ==
=== American football ===
- NCAA Bowl Games
  - Meineke Car Care Bowl: West Virginia 31, North Carolina 30
    - Mountaineers quarterback Pat White wins his fourth straight bowl game for WVU.
  - Champs Sports Bowl: Florida State 42, Wisconsin 14
  - Emerald Bowl: California 24, Miami (FL) 17

=== Cricket ===
- South Africa in Australia:
  - 2nd Test in Melbourne, day 2:
    - Australia 394 (Ricky Ponting 101, Michael Clarke 88*, Dale Steyn 5/87); South Africa 198/7 (Graeme Smith 62, Peter Siddle 3/24). South Africa trail by 196 runs with three first innings wickets remaining.
- Sri Lanka in Bangladesh:
  - 1st Test in Dhaka, day 2:
    - Sri Lanka 293 (Thilan Samaraweera 90, Shakib Al Hasan 5/70); Bangladesh 177/9 (Imrul Kayes 33, Muttiah Muralitharan 5/48). Bangladesh trail by 116 runs with one first innings wicket remaining.

=== Ice hockey ===
- World Junior Championships in Ottawa, Ontario, Canada
  - Group A (at Scotiabank Place):
    - Kazakhstan 0–9 Germany
  - Group B (at the Ottawa Civic Centre):
    - Slovakia 7–2 Latvia

=== Winter sports ===
==== Cross-country skiing ====
- Tour de Ski, stage 1 in Oberhof, Germany:
  - 2.8 km freestyle women: (1) Claudia Nystad (Germany) 6 minutes 17.2 seconds, (2) Arianna Follis (Italy) at 1.1 seconds, (3) Justyna Kowalczyk (Poland) 2.3, Petra Majdič (Slovenia) same time
  - 3.7 km freestyle men: (1) Axel Teichmann (Germany) 7:11.8, (2) Dario Cologna (Switzerland) at 8.2 sec, (3) Petter Northug (Norway) 13.0

==== Nordic combined ====
- World Cup in Oberhof, Germany:
  - 10 km Gundersen: (1) Magnus Moan (Norway) 25:22.8 (7th in ski jump) (2) Todd Lowick (United States) at 0.3 (4) (3) Anssi Koivuranta (Finland) 0.4 (1)
    - Overall World Cup standings (after 7 out of 24 races): (1) Koivuranta 443 points (2) Moan 351 (3) Björn Kircheisen (Germany) 339

== December 26, 2008 (Friday) ==
=== American football ===
- NCAA Bowl Games:
  - Motor City Bowl: Florida Atlantic 24, Central Michigan 21

=== Cricket ===
- South Africa in Australia:
  - 2nd Test in Melbourne, day 1:
    - Australia 206/6 (Ricky Ponting 101, Dale Steyn 2/61).
- Sri Lanka in Bangladesh:
  - 1st Test in Dhaka, day 1:
    - Sri Lanka 172/6 (Michael Vandort 44, Shakib Al Hasan 3/43).
- West Indies in New Zealand:
  - 1st T20I in Auckland:
    - New Zealand 155/7 (Ross Taylor 63, Chris Gayle 2/16); West Indies 155/8 (Chris Gayle 67, Daniel Vettori 3/16). West Indies win in a 'Super Over' playoff and lead the two-match series 1–0.

=== Ice hockey ===
- World Junior Championships in Ottawa, Ontario, Canada
  - Group A (at Scotiabank Place):
    - Germany 2–8 United States
    - Canada 8–1 Czech Republic
  - Group B (at the Ottawa Civic Centre):
    - Latvia 1–4 Russia
    - Finland 1–3 Sweden

== December 25, 2008 (Thursday) ==
=== Basketball ===
- NBA Christmas Day Games:
  - Orlando Magic 88, New Orleans Hornets 68
    - Chris Paul's streak of 108 consecutive games with a steal was broken.
  - San Antonio Spurs 91, Phoenix Suns 90
    - Roger Mason hits a walk-off three-pointer to win the game for the Spurs.
  - Los Angeles Lakers 92, Boston Celtics 83
    - The Celtics' 19-game winning streak ends and Lakers coach Phil Jackson becomes the fastest coach to the 1,000-win mark.
  - Cleveland Cavaliers 93, Washington Wizards 89
  - Dallas Mavericks 102, Portland Trail Blazers 94

== December 24, 2008 (Wednesday) ==
=== American football ===
- NCAA Bowl Games:
  - 2008 Hawaiʻi Bowl: Notre Dame 49, Hawaiʻi 21
    - The Irish break a nine-game bowl losing streak thanks to Jimmy Clausen's 401 yards of passing and five touchdowns.

=== Football (soccer) ===
- ASEAN Championship:
  - Finals, first leg:
    - Thailand 1–2 Vietnam

== December 23, 2008 (Tuesday) ==
=== American football ===
- NCAA Bowl Games:
  - Poinsettia Bowl: (11) TCU 17, (9) Boise State 16
    - The Horned Frogs spoil the Broncos' bid for a perfect season.

=== Baseball ===
- News: ESPN reports that free agent first baseman Mark Teixeira has signed an eight-year deal with the New York Yankees for US $180 million, subject to passing a physical.

=== Cricket ===
- England in India:
  - 2nd Test in Mohali, day 5:
    - India 453 and 251/7 declared (Gautam Gambhir 97, Monty Panesar 1/44); England 302 and 64/1 (Ian Bell 24*, Ishant Sharma 1/7). Match drawn, India win the two match series 1–0.
- West Indies in New Zealand:
  - 2nd Test in Napier, day 5:
    - West Indies 307 and 375 (Chris Gayle 197, Jeetan Patel 5/110); New Zealand 371 and 220/5 (Jesse Ryder 59*, Jerome Taylor 2/67). Match drawn, two match series drawn 0–0.

=== Football (soccer) ===
- Argentine league:
  - Apertura play-off:
    - Boca Juniors 0–1 Tigre
      - Boca wins the championship despite their loss by better goals-difference.

== December 22, 2008 (Monday) ==
=== American football ===
- National Football League Week 16 Monday Night Football:
  - Chicago Bears 20, Green Bay Packers 17 (OT)
    - The Bears block a potential game-winning field goal attempt by Mason Crosby with 18 seconds left in regulation, and Robbie Gould's 38-yarder in overtime keeps the Bears alive for a playoff berth.

=== Cricket ===
- England in India:
  - 2nd Test in Mohali, day 4:
    - India 453 (Gautam Gambhir 179) and 134/4 (Gambhir 44*); England 302 (Kevin Pietersen 144). India lead by 285 runs with 6 wickets remaining.
- West Indies in New Zealand:
  - 2nd Test in Napier, day 4:
    - West Indies 307 (Shivnarine Chanderpaul 126) and 278/7 (Chris Gayle 146*); New Zealand 371 (Tim McIntosh 136). West Indies lead by 214 runs with 3 wickets remaining.

=== Winter sports ===
==== Alpine skiing ====
- Men's World Cup in Alta Badia, Italy:
  - Slalom: (1) Ivica Kostelić (Croatia) 1:39.83 (49.26 + 50.57), (2) Jean-Baptiste Grange (France) 1:40.03 (49.79 + 50.24), (3) Benjamin Raich (Austria) 1:40.63 (49.83 + 50.80)
    - World Cup overall standings (after 13 races): (1) Aksel Lund Svindal (Norway) 430pts, (2) Raich 393, (3) Grange 366

== December 21, 2008 (Sunday) ==
=== American football ===
- National Football League Week 16:
  (teams in **boldface** are in the playoffs; teams in italics are eliminated)
  - New England Patriots 47, **Arizona Cardinals** 7
  - Cincinnati Bengals 14, Cleveland Browns 0
  - Miami Dolphins 38, Kansas City Chiefs 31
    - The Dolphins keep their playoff hopes alive with a win in Arrowhead Stadium.
  - New Orleans Saints 42, Detroit Lions 7
    - The Lions' 15th straight loss sets a new record for futility at the start of a season and clinches the first pick in the 2009 NFL draft.
  - **Tennessee Titans** 31, **Pittsburgh Steelers** 14
    - The Titans clinch home field advantage in the AFC playoffs.
  - San Diego Chargers 41, Tampa Bay Buccaneers 24
    - The Chargers stay in contention for the AFC West title.
  - San Francisco 49ers 17, St. Louis Rams 16
  - Buffalo Bills 30, Denver Broncos 23
    - The Broncos' loss and the Chargers win set up a winner-take-all game for the AFC West title next Sunday in San Diego.
  - Oakland Raiders 27, Houston Texans 16
  - Seattle Seahawks 13, New York Jets 3
    - Mike Holmgren wins his last home game as the Seahawks' coach.
  - **Atlanta Falcons** 24, Minnesota Vikings 17
    - The win gives the Falcons a playoff spot.
  - Washington Redskins 10, Philadelphia Eagles 3
  - **New York Giants** 34, **Carolina Panthers** 28 (OT)
    - The Giants clinch home-field advantage in the playoffs after a Brandon Jacobs touchdown in overtime.
- NCAA Bowl Games:
  - New Orleans Bowl: Southern Mississippi 31, Troy 28 (OT)

=== Badminton ===
- Super Series Masters Finals in Kota Kinabalu, Sabah, Malaysia:
  - Men's singles: Lee Chong Wei (Malaysia) (1) bt Peter Gade (Denmark) (4) 21–8 21–16
  - Men's doubles: Koo Kien Keat/Tan Boon Heong (Malaysia) (6) bt Jung Jae-sung/Lee Yong-dae (South Korea) (3) 21–18 21–14
  - Women's singles: Zhou Mi (Hong Kong) (1) bt Wang Chen (Hong Kong) (3) 21–14 21–18
  - Women's doubles: Chin Eei Hui/Wong Pei Tty (Malaysia) (1) bt Vita Marissa/Liliyana Natsir (Indonesia) (2) 21–15 22–20
  - Mixed doubles: Thomas Laybourn/Kamilla Rytter Juhl (Denmark) (2) bt Nova Widianto/Liliyana Natsir (Indonesia) (1) 21–19 18–21 22–20

=== Cricket ===
- South Africa in Australia:
  - 1st Test in Perth, day 5:
    - Australia 375 and 319; South Africa 281 and 414/4 (Graeme Smith 108, AB de Villiers 106*, Mitchell Johnson 3/98). **South Africa win by six wickets and lead the 3-match series 1–0**.
- England in India:
  - 2nd Test in Mohali, day 3:
    - India 453; England 282/6. England trail by 171 runs with 4 wickets remaining in the 1st innings.
- West Indies in New Zealand:
  - 2nd Test in Napier, day 3:
    - West Indies 307 and 62/2 (Chris Gayle 36*); New Zealand 371 (Tim McIntosh 136, Fidel Edwards 7/87). West Indies trail by two runs with eight second innings wickets remaining.

=== Football (soccer) ===
- FIFA Club World Cup in Japan:
  - Match for third place:
    - Pachuca (Mexico) 0–1 (Japan) Gamba Osaka
  - Final:
    - LDU Quito (Ecuador) 0–1 (England) **Manchester United**
      - Wayne Rooney scores for United in the 73rd minute.
- ASEAN Championship:
  (first leg result in parentheses)
  - Semifinals, second leg:
    - Singapore 0(0)–1(0) **Vietnam**

=== Golf ===
- European Tour:
  - South African Open Championship in Paarl, South Africa:
    - Winner: (South Africa) Richard Sterne 274 (−14)^{PO}
- Men's unofficial events:
  - Chevron World Challenge in Thousand Oaks, California:
    - (Fiji) Vijay Singh wins.

=== Snooker ===
- UK Championship in Telford, United Kingdom:
  - Final: (England) **Shaun Murphy** def. (Hong Kong) Marco Fu 10–9

=== Winter sports ===
==== Alpine skiing ====
- Women's World Cup in St. Moritz, Switzerland:
  - Downhill: cancelled
- Men's World Cup in Alta Badia, Italy:
  - Giant slalom: (1) Daniel Albrecht (Switzerland) 2:32.71 (1:15.33 + 1:17.38) (2) Ivica Kostelić (Croatia) 2:32.83 (1:16.62 + 1:16.21) (3) Hannes Reichelt (Austria) 2:33.04 (1:16.79 + 1:16.25)
    - Overall standings (after 12 races): (1) Aksel Lund Svindal (Norway) 430 (2) Didier Cuche (Switzerland) 334 (3) Benjamin Raich (Austria) 333

==== Biathlon ====
- World Cup 3 in Hochfilzen, Austria:
  - Men's 4 x 7.5 km relay: (1) Austria 1:21:23.18 0+1 0+4 (2) Sweden 1:22:34.33 +1:11.2 0+3 1+9 (3) France 1:22:39.44 +1:16.3 0+2 0+3
  - Women's 4 x 6 km relay: (1) Russia 1 hr 14 min 00.3 sec, (2) Germany at 1:43.4, (3) France 2:13.8

==== Bobsleigh ====
- World Cup 4 in Cesana Pariol, Italy: cancelled

==== Cross-country skiing ====
- World Cup in Düsseldorf, Germany:
  - Team sprint freestyle men: (1) Norway 17:37.0 (2) Sweden 17:37.0 (3) Russia 17:37.7
  - Team sprint freestyle women: (1) Russia 9:35.5 (2) Norway 9:35.7 (3) Germany 9:37.3

==== Nordic combined ====
- World Cup in Ramsau am Dachstein, Austria:
  - 10 km Gundersen: (1) Björn Kircheisen (Germany) 23:43.3 (10th after ski jump leg) (2) Bill Demong (United States) at 0.3 (7) (3) Jason Lamy-Chappuis (France) 0.5 (9)
    - Overall World Cup standings (after six of 24 events): (1) Anssi Koivuranta (Finland) 383 points (2) Kircheisen 299 (3) Demong 290

==== Skeleton ====
- World Cup 4 in Cesana Pariol, Italy: cancelled

==== Ski jumping ====
- World Cup in Engelberg, Switzerland:
  - Individual 137 m hill: (1) Gregor Schlierenzauer (Austria) 264.1 pts (133.5 m + 133.5 m) (2) Wolfgang Loitzl (Austria) 262.4 (132.5+133.0) (3) Simon Amman (Switzerland) 260.0 (131.5+136.0)
    - Overall World Cup standings (after seven of 28 events): (1) Amman 585 (2) Schlierenzauer 510 (3) Loitzl 359

==== Snowboarding ====
- World Cup in Arosa, Switzerland:
  - Parallel slalom men: (1) Siegfried Grabner (Austria) (2) Roland Fischnaller (Italy) (3) Zan Kosir (Slovenia)
  - Parallel slalom women: (1) Heidi Neururer (Austria) (2) Michelle Gorgone (United States) (3) Isabella Laboeck (Germany)

== December 20, 2008 (Saturday) ==
=== American football ===
- National Football League Week 16 Saturday Night Football:
  - Baltimore Ravens 33, Dallas Cowboys 24
    - A celebration of the last game played at Texas Stadium is ruined by two late touchdown runs by Willis McGahee (77 yards) and Le'Ron McClain (82 yards) for the Ravens.
- College football:
  - NCAA Bowl Games:
    - EagleBank Bowl: Wake Forest 29, Navy 19
    - New Mexico Bowl: Colorado State 40, Fresno State 35
    - St. Petersburg Bowl: South Florida 41, Memphis 14
    - Las Vegas Bowl: Arizona 31, (16) Brigham Young 21
  - NCAA Division III Final at Salem, Virginia:
    - Mount Union 31, Wisconsin-Whitewater 26
      - The Purple Raiders win for the third time in four consecutive D-III finals against the Warhawks, taking a 21–7 lead in the first quarter and never looking back. Mount Union's Nate Kmic becomes the first player in NCAA history to rush for over 8,000 yards in his career.

=== Cricket ===
- South Africa in Australia:
  - 1st Test in Perth, day 4:
    - Australia 375 and 319; South Africa 281 and 227/3. South Africa require another 187 runs with 7 wickets remaining.
- England in India:
  - 2nd Test in Mohali, day 2:
    - India 453 (Gautam Gambhir 179, Rahul Dravid 136)
- West Indies in New Zealand:
  - 2nd Test in Napier, day 2:
    - West Indies 307 (Shivnarine Chanderpaul 126*, Iain O'Brien 6/75); New Zealand 145/2 (Tim McIntosh 62*, Fidel Edwards 2/26). New Zealand trail by 162 runs with 8 wickets remaining in the first innings.
      - Fidel Edwards took his 100th Test wicket when he dismissed Daniel Flynn in New Zealand's first innings.

=== Football (soccer) ===
- ASEAN Championship:
  (first leg result in parentheses)
  - Semifinals, second leg:
    - Thailand 2(1)–1(0) Indonesia
- Argentine league:
  - Apertura play-off:
    - Boca Juniors 3–1 San Lorenzo
      - A goal by Cristian Manuel Chávez in injury time for Boca means they can lose to Tigre by one goal margin on Tuesday and still win the championship.

=== Volleyball ===
- Penn State wins their second consecutive NCAA women's championship, defeating Stanford 3–0. The Nittany Lions finish the season 38–0, only losing two sets total.

=== Winter sports ===
==== Alpine skiing ====
- Men's World Cup in Val Gardena, Italy:
  - Downhill: (1) Michael Walchhofer (Austria) 1:50.57 (2) Bode Miller (United States) 1:50.95 (3) Manuel Osborne-Paradis (Canada) 1:51.11
    - Overall World Cup standings (after 11 races): (1) Aksel Lund Svindal (Norway) 398 pts (2) Carlo Janka (Switzerland) 315 (3) Benjamin Raich (Austria) 297
- Women's World Cup in St. Moritz, Switzerland:
  - Super giant slalom: (1) Lara Gut (Switzerland) 57.38 (2) Fabienne Suter (Switzerland) 58.01 (3) Nadia Fanchini (Italy) 58.25
    - Overall World Cup standings (after 10 races): (1) Lindsey Vonn (United States) 438 pts (2) Tanja Poutiainen (Finland) 400 (3) Maria Riesch (Germany) 378

==== Biathlon ====
- World Cup 3 in Hochfilzen, Austria:
  - Men's 10 km sprint: (1) Lars Berger (Norway) 25:23.1 0 penalty (2) Alexander Os (Norway) at 37.9 1 (3) Dmitri Yaroshenko (Russia) 39.8 0
    - Overall World Cup standings (after seven races): (1) Emil Hegle Svendsen (Norway) 299 points (2) Tomasz Sikora (Poland) 289 (3) Michael Greis (Germany) 281
  - Women's 7.5 km sprint: (1) Svetlana Sleptsova (Russia) 23 min 21.8 sec 1 penalty (2) Ekaterina Iourieva (Russia) at 2.7 s 0 (3) Vita Semerenko (Ukraine) 16.6 0
    - Overall World Cup standings (after seven events): (1) Sleptsova 327 points (2) Martina Beck (Germany) 278 (3) Iourieva 277

==== Bobsleigh ====
- World Cup 4 in Cesana Pariol, Italy: cancelled

==== Cross-country skiing ====
- World Cup in Düsseldorf, Germany:
  - 1.6 km sprint freestyle men: (1) Ola Vigen Hattestad (Norway) (2) Tor Arne Hetland (Norway) (3) Fabio Pasini (Italy)
    - Overall standings (after seven out of 33 races): (1) Hattestad 300 points (2) Dario Cologna (Switzerland) 208 (3) Hetland 191
  - 0.8 km sprint freestyle women: (1) Petra Majdič (Slovenia) (2) Natalia Matveeva (Russia) (3) Maiken Caspersen Falla (Norway)
    - Overall standings (after seven out of 33 races): (1) Aino-Kaisa Saarinen (Finland) 397 points (2) Majdic 389 (3) Marit Bjørgen (Norway) 280

==== Freestyle skiing ====
- World Cup in Adventure Mountain, China:
  - Aerials men: (1) Alexei Grishin (Belarus) 249.25 (2) Li Ke (China) 244.52 (3) Warren Shouldice (Canada) 238.90
  - Aerials women: (1) Zhao Shanshan (China) 201.63 (2) Li Nina (China) 192.81 (3) Lydia Lassila (Australia) 179.06

==== Nordic combined ====
- World Cup in Ramsau am Dachstein, Austria:
  - 10 km Gundersen: (1) Bill Demong (United States) 25:59.4 (2nd after ski-jump leg) (2) Björn Kircheisen (Germany) at 28.3 (6) (3) Jan Schmid (Norway) 37.3 (8)
    - Overall World Cup standings (after five out of 24 races): (1) Anssi Koivuranta (Finland) 333 points (2) Magnus Moan (Norway) 211 (3) Demong 210

==== Ski jumping ====
- World Cup in Engelberg, Switzerland:
  - Individual 137 m hill: (1) Simon Ammann (Switzerland) 275.4 points (138.5 m/137.0 m) (2) Wolfgang Loitzl (Austria) 273.2 (134.0/137.5) (3) Gregor Schlierenzauer (Austria) 265.7 (135.0/134.0)
    - World Cup overall standings (after six of 28 events): (1) Ammann 525 points (2) Schlierenzauer 410 (3) Loitzl 279

==== Snowboarding ====
- World Cup in Arosa, Switzerland:
  - Snowboardcross men: (1) Seth Wescott (United States) (2) Markus Schairer (Austria) (3) David Speiser (Germany)
  - Snowboardcross women: (1) Sandra Frei (Switzerland) (2) Helene Olafsen (Norway) (3) Nelly Moenne Loccoz (France)

== December 19, 2008 (Friday) ==
=== American college football ===
- NCAA Division I FCS Final in Chattanooga, Tennessee:
  - Richmond 24, Montana 7
    - The Spiders win their school's first national championship in any sport.

=== Cricket ===
- South Africa in Australia:
  - 1st Test in Perth, day 3:
    - Australia 375 and 228/7 (Brad Haddin 39*, Jacques Kallis 2/19); South Africa 281 (Jacques Kallis 63, Mitchell Johnson 8/61). Australia lead by 322 runs with 3 second innings wickets remaining.
- England in India:
  - 2nd Test in Mohali, day 1:
    - India 179/1 (Gautam Gambhir 106*, Stuart Broad 1/45).
- West Indies in New Zealand:
  - 2nd Test in Napier, day 1:
    - West Indies 258/6 (Shivnarine Chanderpaul 100*, Daniel Vettori 2/58).

=== Winter sports ===
==== Alpine skiing ====
- Men's World Cup in Val Gardena, Italy:
  - Super giant slalom: (1) Werner Heel (Italy) 1:35.04 (2) Didier Défago (Switzerland) 1:35.47 (3) Patrik Järbyn (Sweden) 1:35.49
    - Overall World Cup standings (10 events): (1) Aksel Lund Svindal (Norway) 398 pts (2) Carlo Janka (Switzerland) 315 (3) Benjamin Raich (Austria) 297
- Women's World Cup in St. Moritz, Switzerland:
  - Combined: (1) Anja Pärson (Sweden) 1:41.87 (57.84 + 44.03) (2) Nicole Hosp (Austria) 1:42.99 (59.07 + 43.92) (3) Fabienne Suter (Switzerland) 1:43.47 (58.35 + 45.12)
    - Overall World Cup standings (9 events): (1) Lindsey Vonn (United States) 438 (2) Tanja Poutiainen (Finland) 400 (3) Maria Riesch (Germany) 378

==== Freestyle skiing ====
- World Cup in Adventure Mountain, China:
  - Aerials women: (1) Lydia Lassila (Australia) 92.88 (2) Jacqui Cooper (Australia) 89.14 (3) Veronika Bauer (Canada) 88.83
  - Aerials men: cancelled

==== Skeleton ====
- World Cup 4 in Cesana Pariol, Italy: cancelled

== December 18, 2008 (Thursday) ==
=== American football ===
- National Football League Week 16 Thursday Night Football:
  - **Indianapolis Colts** 31, Jacksonville Jaguars 24.
    - The Colts will be the fifth seed in the AFC playoffs with this win.

=== Basketball ===
- Euroleague, week 8:
  (teams in **bold** advance to the Top 16; teams with ~~strike~~ are eliminated)
  - Group A:
    - ~~Le Mans~~ (France) 73–87 (Israel) **Maccabi Tel Aviv**
      - Maccabi punch their ticket to the Top 16.
    - **Unicaja Málaga** (Spain) 72–68 (Italy) ~~Air Avellino~~
      - Málaga's win secures them, as well as (Croatia) **Cibona**, a Top 16 berth and eliminates Avellino.
  - Group B:
    - Žalgiris Kaunas (Lithuania) 79–68 (Poland) Asseco Prokom Sopot
      - Žalgiris stay alive in the Top 16 race, taking the tiebreaker from Prokom.
  - Group C:
    - ALBA Berlin (Germany) 68–73 (Spain) **TAU Cerámica**
      - TAU also punch their Top 16 ticket.
    - **Lottomatica Roma** (Italy) 74–69 (Slovenia) ~~Union Olimpija Ljubljana~~ (OT)
      - Roma advance to the Top 16, while Ljubljana are eliminated.
  - Group D:
    - Panionios (Greece) 64–78 (Turkey) Efes Pilsen

=== Cricket ===
- South Africa in Australia:
  - 1st Test in Perth, day 2:
    - Australia 375 (Simon Katich 83, Makhaya Ntini 4/72); South Africa 243/8 (Jacques Kallis 63, AB de Villiers 63, Mitchell Johnson 7/42). South Africa trail by 132 runs with 2 wickets remaining in the first innings.

=== Football (soccer) ===
- FIFA Club World Cup in Japan:
  - Semifinal 2:
    - Gamba Osaka (Japan) 3–5 (England) Manchester United
  - Match for fifth place:
    - Al Ahly (Egypt) 0–1 (Australia) Adelaide United
- UEFA Cup group stage, matchday 5:
  (teams in **bold** advance to the last-32 round; teams with ~~strike~~ are eliminated)
  - Group A:
    - **Paris Saint-Germain** (France) 4–0 (Netherlands) **Twente**
    - ~~Racing Santander~~ (Spain) 3–1 (England) **Manchester City**
    - Idle: ~~Schalke 04~~
      - Final standings: Man City 7 points, Twente 6, PSG 5, Racing 5, Schalke 4
  - Group B:
    - **Olympiacos** (Greece) 4–0 (Germany) ~~Hertha BSC~~
    - ~~Benfica~~ (Portugal) 0–1 (Ukraine) **Metalist Kharkiv**
    - Idle: **Galatasaray**
      - Final standings: Metalist 10 points, Galatasaray 9, Olympiacos 6, Hertha 2, Benfica 1
  - Group C:
    - **Sampdoria** (Italy) 1–0 (Spain) ~~Sevilla~~
    - **Stuttgart** (Germany) 3–0 (Belgium) **Standard Liège**
    - Idle: ~~Partizan Belgrade~~
      - Final standings: Standard 9 points, Stuttgart 7, Sampdoria 7, Sevilla 6, Partizan 0
  - Group D:
    - **NEC** (Netherlands) 2–0 (Italy) **Udinese**
    - **Tottenham Hotspur** (England) 2–2 (Russia) ~~Spartak Moscow~~
    - Idle: ~~Dinamo Zagreb~~
      - Final standings: Udinese 9 points, Spurs 7, NEC 6, Spartak 4, Dinamo 3

=== Winter sports ===
==== Biathlon ====
- World Cup 3 in Hochfilzen, Austria:
  - Men's 20 km individual: (1) Maxim Tchoudov (Russia) 56 mins 00.3 secs (1 penalty) (2) Ivan Tcherezov (Russia) at 47.6 (2) (3) Björn Ferry (Sweden) 48.5 (1)
    - Overall World Cup standings (after six races): (1) Emil Hegle Svendsen (Norway) 299 points (2) Tomasz Sikora (Poland) 255 (3) Michael Greis (Germany) 243
  - Women's 15 km individual: (1) Albina Akhatova (Russia) 50 mins 03.0 secs (0 penalties) (2) Éva Tófalvi (Romania) at 17.5 (0) (3) Svetlana Sleptsova (Russia) 49.9 (2)
    - Overall World Cup standings (after six races): (1) Sleptsova 267 points (2) Martina Beck (Germany) 251 (3) Ekaterina Iourieva (Russia) 223

==== Freestyle skiing ====
- World Cup in Meribel, France:
  - Moguls men: (1) Pierre-Alexandre Rousseau (Canada) (2) Alexandre Bilodeau (Canada) (3) Anthony Benna (France)
  - Moguls women: (1) Hannah Kearney (United States) (2) Jennifer Heil (Canada) (3) Nikola Sudova (Czech Republic)

== December 17, 2008 (Wednesday) ==
=== Basketball ===
- Euroleague, week 8:
  (teams in **bold** advance to the Top 16; teams with ~~strike~~ are eliminated)
  - Group A:
    - **Olympiacos** (Greece) 93–64 (Croatia) Cibona Zagreb
  - Group B:
    - **Regal FC Barcelona** (Spain) 87–61 (Italy) **Montepaschi Siena**
      - Barcelona improve to a league-best 7–1 record.
    - **Panathinaikos Athens** (Greece) 83–69 (France) SLUC Nancy
      - Panathinaikos secure their place in the Top 16.
  - Group C:
    - Fenerbahçe Ülker (Turkey) 89–63 (Spain) DKV Joventut
  - Group D:
    - **CSKA Moscow** (Russia) 78–82 (Spain) Real Madrid
    - AJ Milano (Italy) 73–59 (Serbia) Partizan Belgrade

=== Cricket ===
- South Africa in Australia:
  - 1st Test in Perth, day 1:
    - Australia 341/9 (Simon Katich 83)

=== Football (soccer) ===
- FIFA Club World Cup in Japan:
  - Semifinal 1:
    - Pachuca (Mexico) 0–2 (Ecuador) LDU Quito
- UEFA Cup group stage, matchday 5:
  (teams in **bold** advance to the last-32 round; teams with ~~strike~~ are eliminated)
  - Group E:
    - ~~Portsmouth~~ (England) 3–0 (Netherlands) ~~Heerenveen~~
    - **Milan** (Italy) 2–2 (Germany) **Wolfsburg**
    - Idle: **Braga**
      - Final standings: Wolfsburg 10 pts, Milan 8, Braga 6, Portsmouth 4, Heerenveen 0.
  - Group F:
    - **Hamburg** (Germany) 3–1 (England) **Aston Villa**
    - **Ajax** (Netherlands) 2–2 (Czech Republic) ~~Slavia Prague~~
    - Idle: ~~Žilina~~
      - Final standings: Hamburg 9 pts, Ajax 7, Aston Villa 6, Žilina 4, Slavia Prague 2.
  - Group G:
    - ~~Club Brugge~~ (Belgium) 0–1 (Denmark) **Copenhagen**
    - **Saint-Étienne** (France) 2–2 (Spain) **Valencia**
    - Idle: ~~Rosenborg~~
      - Final standings: St. Étienne 8 pts, Valencia 6, Copenhagen 5, Brugge 3, Rosenborg 2.
  - Group H:
    - **Deportivo** (Spain) 1–0 (France) ~~Nancy~~
    - ~~Feyenoord~~ (Netherlands) 0–1 (Poland) **Lech Poznań**
    - Idle: **CSKA Moscow**
      - Final standings: CSKA 12 pts, Deportivo 7, Poznań 5, Nancy 4, Feyenoord 0.
- ASEAN Championship:
  - Semifinals, first leg:
    - Vietnam 0–0 Singapore
- Argentine league:
  - Apertura play off:
    - San Lorenzo 2–1 Tigre

== December 16, 2008 (Tuesday) ==
=== Football (soccer) ===
- ASEAN Championship:
  - Semifinals, first leg:
    - Indonesia 0–1 Thailand

== December 15, 2008 (Monday) ==
=== American football ===
- National Football League Week 15 Monday Night Football:
  - Philadelphia Eagles 30, Cleveland Browns 10
- The Arena Football League votes to suspend operations, cancelling its 2009 season.

=== Basketball ===
- NBA:
  - With their 100–91 win over the Utah Jazz, the Boston Celtics become the third team in NBA history to win 23 of its first 25 games.
  - The Sacramento Kings fire Reggie Theus, making him the sixth head coach to be fired this season. Assistant Kenny Natt is named his interim replacement.

=== Cricket ===
- England in India:
  - 1st Test in Chennai, day 5:
    - England 316 and 311/9 dec; India 241 and 387/4 (Sachin Tendulkar 103*). India win by 6 wickets.
- West Indies in New Zealand:
  - 1st Test in Dunedin, day 5:
    - Play abandoned due to rain. New Zealand 365 and 44/2; West Indies 340. Match drawn.

== December 14, 2008 (Sunday) ==
=== American football ===
- National Football League Week 15:
  (teams in **bold** clinched a playoff berth; teams in italics are eliminated)
  - New York Jets 31, Buffalo Bills 27
    - The Bills are eliminated from playoff contention.
  - Indianapolis Colts 31, Detroit Lions 21
    - The Lions drop to 0–14, the third team ever to lose the first 14 games of a season (1976 Buccaneers, 1980 Saints).
  - Jacksonville Jaguars 20, Green Bay Packers 16
    - The Packers are eliminated with the loss.
  - San Diego Chargers 22, Kansas City Chiefs 21
  - Miami Dolphins 14, San Francisco 49ers 9
  - Seattle Seahawks 23, St. Louis Rams 20
  - Atlanta Falcons 13, Tampa Bay Buccaneers 10 (OT)
    - Atlanta's win eliminated the New Orleans Saints from playoff contention.
  - Houston Texans 13, **Tennessee Titans** 12
    - The Texans' win prevents Tennessee from getting home-field advantage throughout the AFC playoffs for this week.
  - Cincinnati Bengals 20, Washington Redskins 13
  - Minnesota Vikings 35, **Arizona Cardinals** 14
  - Carolina Panthers 30, Denver Broncos 10
  - New England Patriots 49, Oakland Raiders 26
  - **Pittsburgh Steelers** 13, Baltimore Ravens 9
    - The win gives the Steelers the AFC North title and a first-round playoff bye, and sets up a showdown with the Titans for AFC playoff home field advantage next Sunday.
  - Dallas Cowboys 20, **New York Giants** 8
    - The Giants loss now sets up a showdown with Carolina for home field advantage in the NFC playoffs next week.

=== Cricket ===
- England in India:
  - 1st Test in Chennai, day 4:
    - England 316 and 311/9 dec (Andrew Strauss 108, Paul Collingwood 108, Zaheer Khan 3/40); India 241 and 131/1 (Virender Sehwag 83). India need 256 runs to win with nine wickets in hand.
- West Indies in New Zealand:
  - 1st Test in Dunedin, day 4:
    - New Zealand 365 and 44/2 (Tim McIntosh 24*, Daren Powell 2/17); West Indies 340 (Jerome Taylor 106, Daniel Vettori 6/56). New Zealand lead by 69 runs with 8 second innings wickets remaining.

=== Football (soccer) ===
- FIFA Club World Cup in Japan:
  - Quarterfinal 2:
    - Adelaide United (Australia) 0–1 (Japan) Gamba Osaka
      - Gamba Osaka will play Manchester United (England) in the semifinals.
- Caribbean Championship in Jamaica:
  - Third Place Playoff:
    - Cuba 0–0 **Guadeloupe**
      - Guadeloupe wins 5–4 in penalty shootout.
  - Final:
    - Grenada 0–2 **Jamaica**
      - Luton Shelton scores twice from the penalty spot for The Reggae Boyz.
- Argentine league:
  - The Apertura ends with 3-way tie between San Lorenzo, Tigre and Boca Juniors, that requires a triangular play-off series, beginning on Wednesday.

=== Golf ===
- European Tour:
  - Alfred Dunhill Championship in Mpumalanga, South Africa
    - Winner: Richard Sterne (South Africa) 271 (−17)
- Men's unofficial events:
  - Merrill Lynch Shootout in Naples, Florida:
    - Winners: Kenny Perry (United States) & Scott Hoch (United States)

=== Gymnastics ===
- Artistic Gymnastics World Cup Final in Madrid, Spain:
  - Men:
    - Vault: (1) Thomas Bouhail (France) 16.225 (2) Jeffrey Wammes (Netherlands) 16.150 (3) Anton Golotsutskov (Russia) 16.075 (3) Isaak Botella Perez (Spain) 16.075
    - Parallel bars: (1) Yann Cucherat (France) 15.775 (1) Feng Zhe (China) 15.775 (3) Valeriy Goncharov (Ukraine) 15.675
    - Horizontal bars: (1) Epke Zonderland (Netherlands) 16.175 (2) Philippe Rizzo (Australia) 15.825 (3) Hiroyuki Tomita (Japan) 15.325
  - Women:
    - Beam: (1) Lauren Mitchell (Australia) 15.250 (2) Yulia Lozhechko (Russia) 15.200 (3) Li Shanshan (China) 15.150
    - Floor: (1) Cheng Fei 15.375 (2) Jiang Yuyan (China) 15.225 (3) Sandra Izbaşa (Romania) 15.000

=== Handball ===
- European Women's Championship in Macedonia:
  - Bronze match:
    - Germany 21–24 **Russia**
  - Final:
    - Spain 21–34 **Norway**
      - Norway wins the European title for the third successive time.

=== Rugby union ===
- Heineken Cup Pool stage, week 4:
  - Pool 2:
    - London Wasps (England) 19–11 (Scotland) Edinburgh Rugby
  - Pool 3:
    - Perpignan (France) 26–20 (England) Leicester Tigers
      - Dan Carter, on his half-season "sabbatical" from the All Blacks, makes a successful Northern Hemisphere club debut, scoring 16 points to lead Perpignan to the win.
  - Pool 5:
    - Glasgow Warriors (Scotland) 19–25 (England) Bath

=== Swimming ===
- European Short Course Championships in Rijeka, Croatia:
  - Women:
    - 400 m individual medley: (1) Mireia Belmonte García (Spain) 4:25.06 (WR) (2) Alessia Filippi (Italy) 4:26.06 (3) Francesca Segat (Italy) 4:27.12
    - 200 m freestyle: (1) Federica Pellegrini (Italy) 1:51.85 (WR) (2) Femke Heemskerk (Netherlands) 1:53.79 (3) Daria Belyakina (Russia) 1:53.85
    - 100 m breaststroke: (1) Valentina Artemyeva (Russia) 1:05.02 (2) Sophie de Ronchi (France) 1:05.43 (3) Mirna Jukić (Austria) 1:05.64
    - 100 m butterfly: (1) Jeanette Ottesen (Denmark) 56.70 CR (2) Diane Bui Duyet (France) 56.83 (3) Eszter Dara (Hungary) 56.88
    - 200 m backstroke: (1) Alexandra Putra (France) 2:02.48 (2) Alexianne Castel (France) 2:03.10 (3) Elizabeth Simmonds (United Kingdom) 2:03.12
    - 50 m freestyle: (1) Marleen Veldhuis (Netherlands) 23.55 CR (2) Hinkelien Schreuder (Netherlands) 23.72 (3) Jeanette Ottesen (Denmark) 24.05
  - Men:
    - 200 m breaststroke: (1) Hugues Duboscq (France) 2:04.59 (European Record) (2) Edoardo Giorgetti (Italy) 2:04.98 (3) Igor Borysik (Ukraine) 2:05.47
    - 100 m individual medley: (1) Peter Mankoč (Slovenia) 51.97 (European Record) (2) Christian Galenda (Italy) 52.29 (3) James Goddard (United Kingdom) 52.36
    - 200 m freestyle: (1) Danila Izotov (Russia) 1:43.09 (2) Dominik Meichtry (Switzerland) 1:43.11 (3) Massimiliano Rosolino (Italy) 1:43.52
    - 100 m backstroke: (1) Stanislav Donets (Russia) 49.32 (WR) (2) Aschwin Wildeboer (Spain) 49.61 (3) Helge Meeuw (Germany) 50.89
    - 50 m butterfly: (1) Amaury Leveaux (France) 22.23 (2) Milorad Čavić (Serbia) 22.36 (3) Rafael Muñoz (Spain) 22.46
    - 4 × 50 m freestyle: (1) France (Alain Bernard, Fabien Gilot, Amaury Leveaux, Frédérick Bousquet) 1:20.77 (WR) (2) Italy (Alessandro Calvi, Marco Orsi, Mattia Nalesso, Filippo Magnini) 1:23.37 (3) Croatia (Duje Draganja, Alexei Puninski, Bruno Barbic, Mario Todorović) 1:23.68

=== Winter sports ===
==== Alpine skiing ====
- Men's World Cup in Val-d'Isère, France:
  - Slalom: cancelled
- Women's World Cup in La Molina, Spain:
  - Slalom: (1) Maria Riesch (Germany) 1:52.98 (2) Lindsey Vonn (United States) 1:54.46 (3) Kathrin Zettel (Austria) 1:55.34
    - Overall World Cup standings: (1) Vonn 438 (2) Tanja Poutiainen (Finland) 400 (3) Riesch 328

==== Biathlon ====
- World Cup 2 in Hochfilzen, Austria:
  (shooting penalties in brackets)
  - Men's 4 x 7.5 km relay: (1) Russia (Nikolay Kruglov, Ivan Tcherezov, Maxim Maksimov, Maxim Tchoudov) 1 hr 24 min 22.9 sec (1), (2) Austria at 1 min 48.1 sec (2), (3) Ukraine 2:38.6 (3)
  - Women's 4 x 6 km relay: (1) Russia (Svetlana Sleptsova, Olga Medvedtseva, Ekaterina Iourieva, Albina Akhatova) 1:10:49.58 (6) (2) Norway 1:12:44.35 +1:54.8 (9) (3) France 1:12:46.41 +1:56.9 (9)

==== Bobsleigh ====
- World Cup 3 in Igls, Austria:
  - Four-man: (1) Russia (Alexandr Zubkov, Roman Oreshnikov, Dmitry Trunenkov, Dmitriy Stepushkin) 1:42.34 (2) United States (Steven Holcomb, Justin Olsen, Steve Mesler, Curtis Tomasevicz) 1:42.48 (3) Russia (Dmitry Abramovitch, Philippe Egorov, Andrey Jurkov, Petr Moiseev) 1:42.54
    - World Cup standings: (1) Zubkov 645 (2) André Lange (Germany) 603 (3) Holcomb 578

==== Cross-country skiing ====
- World Cup in Davos, Switzerland:
  - Sprint freestyle women: (1) Petra Majdič (Slovenia) (2) Celine Brun-Lie (Norway) (3) Marit Bjørgen (Norway)
    - Overall World Cup standings: (1) Aino-Kaisa Saarinen (Finland) 397 (2) Majdic 289 (3) Bjoergen 280
  - Sprint freestyle men: (1) Ola Vigen Hattestad (Norway) (2) Johan Kjoelstad (Norway) (3) Renato Pasini (Italy)
    - Overall World Cup standings: (1) Dario Alonzo Cologna (Switzerland) 208 (2) Hattestad 200 (3) Johan Olsson (Sweden) 186

==== Luge ====
- World Cup 3 in Winterberg, Germany:
  - Women: (1) Natalie Geisenberger (Germany) (2) Tatjana Hüfner (Germany) (3) Anke Wischnewski (Germany)
    - World Cup standings: (1) Hüfner 285 (2) Geisenberger 245 (3) Wischnewski 210

==== Ski jumping ====
- World Cup in Pragelato, Italy:
  - Individual 140 m hill: (1) Fumihisa Yumoto (Japan) 114.8 pts (126.0 m) (2) Simon Ammann (Switzerland) 113.6 (124.5) (3) Johan Remen Evensen (Norway) 110.3 (123.5)
    - World Cup standings (after five events): (1) Ammann 425 (2) Gregor Schlierenzauer (Austria) 350 (3) Ville Larinto (Finland) 205

==== Snowboarding ====
- World Cup in Limone Piemonte, Italy:
  - Men's parallel GS: (1) Matthew Morison (Canada) (2) Sylvain Dufour (France) (3) Jasey Jay Anderson (Canada)
  - Women's parallel GS: (1) Doris Guenther (Austria) (2) Kimiko Zakreski (Canada) (3) Anke Karstens (Germany)

==== Speed skating ====
- World Cup 5 in Nagano, Japan:
  - 500 m women:
  - 500 m men:
  - 1000 m women:
  - 1000 m men:
  - 100 m women:
  - 100 m men:

== December 13, 2008 (Saturday) ==
=== American college football ===
- 2008 Heisman Trophy:
  - With three underclassman quarterbacks as the finalists, Oklahoma's Sam Bradford becomes the second sophomore to win the prestigious award. Last year's winner, Tim Tebow of Florida, had the most first place votes, but lost four of the six regions to Bradford and finished third in total votes behind runner-up Colt McCoy of Texas.
- NCAA Division I FCS semifinal at Cedar Falls, Iowa:
  - Richmond 21, Northern Iowa 20
    - Trailing 20–7 in the fourth quarter, the Spiders come back to score the winning touchdown and extra point with 14 seconds remaining.
- NCAA Division II Championship at Florence, Alabama:
  - Minnesota-Duluth 21, Northwest Missouri State 14
    - The Bulldogs win their first national title in football, while the Bearcats lose in the title game for the fourth straight year, with each loss being by a touchdown or less.

=== Basketball ===
- National Basketball Association news: The Philadelphia 76ers become the league's fifth team to fire their head coach this season, axing Maurice Cheeks after a 9–14 start, even though the Sixers had extended his contract twice in the past year. Assistant general manager Tony DiLeo will be Cheeks' interim replacement.

=== Cricket ===
- England in India:
  - 1st Test in Chennai, day 3:
    - England 316 and 172/3 (Andrew Strauss 73*); India 241 (MS Dhoni 53). England lead by 247 runs with 7 wickets remaining.
- West Indies in New Zealand:
  - 1st Test in Dunedin, day 3:
    - New Zealand 365 (Daniel Flynn 95, Chris Gayle 3/42); West Indies 39/0 (Chris Gayle 29*). West Indies trail by 326 runs with 10 wickets remaining in the 1st innings.

=== Football (soccer) ===
- FIFA Club World Cup in Japan:
  - Quarterfinal 1:
    - Al Ahly (Egypt) 2–4(AET) (Mexico) Pachuca
      - Pachuca comes back from 0–2 down to win in extra-time, and will meet LDU Quito in the semifinals.

=== Gymnastics ===
- Artistic Gymnastics World Cup Final in Madrid, Spain:
  - Men:
    - Floor: (1) Diego Hypólito (Brazil) 16.125 (2) Kōhei Uchimura (Japan) 15.900 (3) Alexander Shatilov (Israel) 15.500
    - Pommel horse: (1) Zhang Hongtao (China) 16.375 (2) Krisztián Berki (Hungary) 16.100 (3) Prashanth Sellathurai (Australia) 16.025
    - Rings: (1) Olexander Vorobyov (Ukraine) 16.275 (2) Yordan Yovchev (Bulgaria) 16.150 (3) Yuri van Gelder (Netherlands) 16.075
  - Women:
    - Vault: (1) Cheng Fei (China) 15.050 (2) Ariella Kaeslin (Switzerland) 14.912 (3) Aagje Vanwalleghem (Belgium) 14.425
    - Uneven bars: (1) He Kexin (China) 16.250 (2) Jiang Yuyan (China) 15.700 (3) Koko Tsurumi (Japan) 15.250

=== Handball ===
- European Women's Championship in Macedonia
  - 5th/6th placement match:
    - Romania 36–33(OT) Croatia
  - Semifinals:
    - Spain 32–29 Germany
    - Norway 24–18 Russia

=== Rugby union ===
- Heineken Cup Pool stage, week 4:
  - Pool 1:
    - Munster (Ireland) 23–13 (France) Clermont
    - Montauban (France) 16–12 (England) Sale Sharks
  - Pool 3:
    - Benetton Treviso (Italy) 16–36 (Wales) Ospreys
  - Pool 4:
    - Harlequins (England) 19–17 (France) Stade Français
  - Pool 5:
    - Newport Gwent Dragons (Wales) 13–26 (France) Toulouse
  - Pool 6:
    - Biarritz (France) 6–10 (Wales) Cardiff Blues 13:35
    - Gloucester (England) 48–5 (Italy) Calvisano

=== Swimming ===
- European Short Course Championships in Rijeka, Croatia:
  - Men:
    - 1500 m freestyle: (1) Federico Colbertaldo (Italy) 14:24.21 (2) Vitaly Romanovich (Russia) 14:29.64 (3) Samuel Pizzetti (Italy) 14:31.60
    - 200 m butterfly: (1) Nikolay Skvortsov (Russia) 1:50.60 (WR) (2) Dinko Jukić (Austria) 1:52.31 (3) Maxim Ganikhin (Russia) 1:52.32
    - 100 m freestyle: (1) Amaury Leveaux (France) 44.94 (WR) (2) Fabien Gilot (France) 45.84 (3) Filippo Magnini (Italy) 46.62
    - 50 m breaststroke: (1) Matjaž Markič (Slovenia) 26.47 CR (2) Aleksander Hetland (Norway) 26.64 (3) Emil Tahirovič (Slovenia) 26.66
  - Women:
    - 400 m freestyle: (1) Coralie Balmy (France) 3:56.39 (2) Camille Muffat (France) 3:57.48 (3) Alessia Filippi (Italy) 3:59.35
    - 100 m individual medley: (1) Hanna-Maria Seppälä (Finland) 59.24 CR (2) Evelyn Verrasztó (Hungary) 59.49 (3) Francesca Segat (Italy) 59.61
    - 50 m backstroke: (1) Sanja Jovanović (Croatia) 26.23 (WR) (2) Kateryna Zubkova (Ukraine) 26.65 (3) Elena Gemo (Italy) 26.77
    - 4 × 50 m medley relay: (1) Netherlands (Ranomi Kromowidjojo, Moniek Nijhuis, Hinkelien Schreuder, Marleen Veldhuis) 1:45.73 (WR) (2) Germany (Daniela Samulski, Janne Schaefer, Lena Kalla, Petra Dallmann) 1:46.84 (3) Italy (Elena Gemo, Roberta Panara, Silvia di Pietro, Federica Pellegrini) 1:47.05

=== Winter sports ===
==== Alpine skiing ====
- Men's World Cup in Val-d'Isère, France:
  - Giant slalom: (1) (Switzerland) Carlo Janka (2) (Italy) Massimiliano Blardone (3) (France) Gauthier de Tessières
    - Overall World Cup standings: (1) Aksel Lund Svindal (Norway) 395 (2) Benjamin Raich (Austria) 293 (3) Janka 291
- Women's World Cup in La Molina, Spain:
  - Giant slalom: (1) (Finland) Tanja Poutiainen (2) (Italy) Manuela Mölgg (3) (Austria) Nicole Hosp

==== Biathlon ====
- World Cup 2 in Hochfilzen, Austria:
  (shooting penalties in brackets)
  - Men's 12.5 km pursuit: (1) Emil Hegle Svendsen (Norway) 35 min 46.3 sec (3), (2) Ole Einar Bjørndalen (Norway) at 9.4 sec (2), (3) Tomasz Sikora (Poland) 12 (3)
    - Overall World Cup standings (after five events): (1) Svendsen 276 pts, (2) Sikora 234, (3) Michael Greis (Germany) 200
  - Women's 10 km pursuit: (1) Martina Beck (Germany) 33 min 41.2 sec (1), (2) Svetlana Sleptsova (Russia) at 18.3 (4), (3) Simone Hauswald (Germany) 19.2 (5)
    - Overall World Cup standings (after five events): (1) Beck 224 pts, (2) Sleptsova 219, (3) Tora Berger (Norway) 206

==== Bobsleigh ====
- World Cup 3 in Igls, Austria:
  - Two-man: (1) Thomas Florschütz / Marc Kühne (Germany) 1:44.62 (2) Beat Hefti / Thomas Lamparter (Switzerland) 1:44.70 +0.08 (3) Steven Holcomb / Justin Olsen (United States) 1:44.75 +0.13
    - World Cup standings (three races): (1) Hefti 635 (2) André Lange (Germany) 627 (3) Matthias Höpfner (Germany) 568

==== Cross-country skiing ====
- World Cup in Davos, Switzerland:
  - Women's 10 km classic: (1) Virpi Kuitunen (Finland) 29 min 51.0 sec, (2) Aino-Kaisa Saarinen (Finland) at 18 seconds, (3) Marit Bjørgen (Norway) 46.7
    - Overall World Cup standings (after five of 33 events): (1) Saarinen 365 pts, (2) Kuitunen 269, (3) Justyna Kowalczyk (Poland) 227
  - Men's 15 km classic: (1) Johan Olsson (Sweden) 40:10.0 (2) Axel Teichmann (Germany) 40:20.5 +10.50 (3) Sami Jauhojärvi (Finland) 40:38.5 +28.50

==== Curling ====
- European Championships in Örnsköldsvik, Sweden:
  (All times CET)
  - Men:
    - Final: Norway 6–7 Scotland
      - David Murdoch's team repeats its win over Thomas Ulsrud last year.
    - World challenge 2: Sweden 6–1 Finland
    - World challenge 3: Sweden 5–7 Finland
      - Finland qualify to 2009 World Championship.
  - Women:
    - Final: Switzerland 5–4 Sweden
      - Mirjam Ott wins her second European title and denies Anette Norberg her 8th championship.
    - World challenge 2: England 7–4 Norway
    - World challenge 3: England 9–10 Norway
      - Norway qualify to 2009 World Championship.

==== Figure skating ====
- Grand Prix:
  - Grand Prix Final and Junior Grand Prix Final in Goyang, South Korea:
    - Junior ice dance:
      - (1) Madison Chock / Greg Zuerlein (United States) 131.15 (2) Madison Hubbell / Keiffer Hubbell (United States) 124.68 (3) Ekaterina Riazanova / Jonathan Guerreiro (Russia) 124.30
    - Junior ladies:
      - (1) Becky Bereswill (United States) 146.69 (2) Yukiko Fujisawa (Japan) 145.92 (3) Alexe Gilles (United States) 144.49
    - Senior ice dance:
      - Final standings (free dance in brackets): (1) Isabelle Delobel/Olivier Schoenfelder (France) 156.10 (95.75) (2) Oksana Domnina/Maxim Shabalin (Russia) 152.95 (93.62) (3) Meryl Davis/Charlie White (United States) 148.04 (92.15)
    - Senior men:
      - Final standings (free skating in brackets): (1) Jeremy Abbott (United States) 237.72 (159.46) (2) Takahiko Kozuka (Japan) 224.63 (140.73) (3) Johnny Weir (United States) 215.50 (143.00)
    - Senior ladies:
      - Final standings (free skating in brackets): (1) Mao Asada (Japan) 188.55 (123.17) (2) Kim Yuna (South Korea) 186.35 (120.41) (3) Carolina Kostner (Italy) 168.01 (112.13)
    - Senior pairs:
      - Final standings (free skating in brackets): (1) Pang Qing/Tong Jian (China) 191.49 (125.25) (2) Zhang Dan/Zhang Hao (China) 188.22 (119.88) (3) Aliona Savchenko/Robin Szolkowy (Germany) 185.09 (114.95)

==== Luge ====
- World Cup 3 in Winterberg, Germany:
  - Men: (1) Armin Zöggeler (Italy) (2) David Möller (Germany) (3) Johannes Ludwig (Germany)
    - World Cup standings: (1) Zöggeler 255 (2) Möller 240 (3) Andi Langenhan (Germany) 180
  - Doubles: (1) Christian Oberstolz / Patrick Gruber (Italy) (2) Markus Schiegl / Tobias Schiegl (Austria) (3) Patric Leitner / Alexander Resch (Germany)
    - World Cup standings: (1) Oberstolz/Gruber 260 (2) Andreas Linger/Wolfgang Linger (Austria) 220 (3) Schiegl/Schiegl 201

==== Skeleton ====
- World Cup 3 in Igls, Austria:
  - Men: (1) Frank Rommel (Germany) 1:46.01 (2) Aleksandr Tretyakov (Russia) 1:46.26 +0.25 (3) Martins Dukurs (Latvia) 1:46.38 +0.37
    - World Cup standings: (1) Dukurs 610 (2) Florian Grassl (Germany) 593 (3) Tretyakov 572

==== Ski jumping ====
- World Cup in Pragelato, Italy:
  - Individual 140 m hill: (1) Simon Ammann (Switzerland) 284.3 points (139.5/144.0 m) (2) Gregor Schlierenzauer (Austria) 282.6 (137.5/139.5 m) (3) Ville Larinto (Finland) 259.2 (131.5/135.0 m)
    - World Cup standings (after four of 28 events): (1) Ammann 345 points (2) Schlierenzauer 300 (3) Larinto 205

==== Speed skating ====
- World Cup 5 in Nagano, Japan:
  - 500 m women:
  - 500 m men:
  - 1000 m women:
  - 1000 m men:

== December 12, 2008 (Friday) ==
=== American college football ===
- NCAA Division I FCS semifinal at Harrisonburg, Virginia:
  - Montana 35, James Madison 27
    - The top-ranked FCS team is upset at home.

=== Cricket ===
- England in India:
  - 1st Test in Chennai, day 2:
    - England 316; India 155/6. India trail by 161 runs with 4 wickets remaining in the 1st innings.
- West Indies in New Zealand:
  - 1st Test in Dunedin, day 2:
    - No play due to rain.

=== Rugby union ===
- Heineken Cup Pool stage, week 4:
  - Pool 2:
    - Castres (France) 18–15 (Ireland) Leinster
  - Pool 4:
    - Scarlets (Wales) 16–16 (Ireland) Ulster

=== Swimming ===
- European Short Course Championships in Rijeka, Croatia:
  - Women:
    - 800 m freestyle: (1) Alessia Filippi (Italy) 8:04.53 (WR) (2) Coralie Balmy (France) 8:05.32 (3) Lotte Friis (Denmark) 8:09.91
    - 200 m breaststroke: (1) Alena Alekseeva (Russia) 2:19.93 (2) Mirna Jukić (Austria) 2:20.48 (3) Patrizia Humplik (Switzerland) 2:21.68
    - 100 m freestyle: (1) Marleen Veldhuis (Netherlands) 51.95 (2) Jeanette Ottesen (Denmark) 52.08 (3) Ranomi Kromowidjojo (Netherlands) 52.22
    - 100 m backstroke: (1) Sanja Jovanovic (Croatia) 58.87 (2) Kateryna Zubkova (Ukraine) 57.01 (3) Laure Manaudou (France) 57.16
    - 50 m butterfly: (1) Hinkelien Schreuder (Netherlands) 25.21 (2) Jeanette Ottesen (Denmark) 25.54 (3) Diane Bui Duyet (France) 25.55
    - 4X50 m freestyle relay: (1) Netherlands 1:33.80 (Hinkelien Schreuder, Inge Dekker, Ranomi Kromowidjojo, Marleen Veldhuis) (2) Sweden 1:38.00 (Petra Granlund, Claire Hedenskog, Sarah Sjöström, Lovisa Ericsson) (3) Germany 1:38.06 (Dorothea Brandt, Petra Dallmann, Lisa Vitting, Daniela Schreiber)
  - Men:
    - 400 m medley: (1) Dinko Jukić (Austria) 4:03.01 (2) Gergő Kis (Hungary) 4:03.81 (3) Lukasz Wojt (Poland) 4:05.13
    - 100 m breaststroke: (1) Igor Borysik (Ukraine) 57.33 (2) Hugues Duboscq (France) 57.64 (3) James Gibson (United Kingdom) 57.91
    - 100 m butterfly: (1) Milorad Čavić (Serbia) 49.19 (European record) (2) Rafael Muñoz Pérez (Spain) 49.74 (3) Nikolay Skvortsov (Russia) 49.98
    - 50 m backstroke: (1) Stanislas Donets (Russia) 23.22 (2) Aschwin Wildeboer (Spain) 23.28 (3) Ľuboš Križko (Slovakia) 23.47

=== Winter sports ===
==== Alpine skiing ====
- Men's World Cup in Val-d'Isère, France:
  - Super combined: (1) Benjamin Raich (Austria) 2:02.48 (2) Jean-Baptiste Grange (France) 2:02.82 (3) Marcel Hirscher (Austria) 2:03.17
    - Overall World Cup standings (8 events): (1) Aksel Lund Svindal (Norway) 345 pts (2) Raich 293 (3) Grange 231

==== Biathlon ====
- World Cup 2 in Hochfilzen, Austria:
  - Men's 10 km sprint: (1) Emil Hegle Svendsen (Norway) 26 min08.1 sec (0 penalty) (2) Ivan Scherezov (Russia) at 26.3 (1) (3) Alexander Os (Norway) 32.9 (2)
    - Overall World Cup standings (4 races): (1) Svendsen 216 points (2) Tomasz Sikora (Poland) 186 (3) Michael Greis (Germany) 164
  - Women's 7.5 km sprint: (1) Simone Hauswald (Germany) 23 min 04.3 sec (0 penalty) (2) Svetlana Sleptsova (Russia) at 14.1 (2) (3) Andrea Henkel (Germany) 18.3 (1)
    - Overall World Cup standings (4 races): (1) Ekaterina Urieva (Russia) 169 points (2) Tora Berger (Norway) 166 (3) Sleptsova 165

==== Bobsleigh ====
- World Cup 3 in Igls, Austria:
  - Two-Woman: (1) Helen Upperton / Heather Moyse (Canada) 1:49.07 (2) Shauna Rohbock / Valerie Fleming (United States) 1:49.21 (3) Sandra Kiriasis / Romy Logsch (Germany) 1:49.23
    - World Cup standings (3 races): (1) Upperton (Canada) 642 (2) Kiriasis (Germany) 635 (3) Cathleen Martini (Germany) 594

==== Curling ====
- European Championships in Örnsköldsvik, Sweden:
  - Men:
    - Semifinal: Germany 2–7 Scotland
      - David Murdoch's Scotland will meet Thomas Ulsrud's Norway in a rematch of last year's final.
    - Division B semifinal: Italy 6–4 Hungary
    - Division B final: Finland 9–2 Italy
    - World challenge 1: Sweden 5–6 Finland
      - Finland takes the lead in the best-of-3 series.
  - Women:
    - Semifinal: Sweden 8–7 Denmark
      - Swedish skip Anette Norberg scores 4 points in the 9th end to advance for her 10th European final, where she'll meet old rival Mirjam Ott's Swiss team, that beat the Swedes twice in this championship.
    - Division B semifinal: Finland 7–5 Hungary
    - Division B final: Norway 9–3 Finland
    - World challenge 1: England 1–10 Norway
      - Norway takes the lead in the best-of-3 series.

==== Figure skating ====
- Grand Prix:
  - Grand Prix Final and Junior Grand Prix Final in Goyang, South Korea:
    - Junior pairs: (1) Lubov Iliushechkina / Nodari Maisuradze (Russia) 149.38 (2) Zhang Yue / Wang Lei (China) 137.92 (3) Ksenia Krasilnikova / Konstantin Bezmaternikh (Russia) 137.22
    - Junior men: (1) Florent Amodio (France) 199.58 (2) Armin Mahbanoozadeh (United States) 193.48 (3) Richard Dornbush (United States) 183.93
    - Senior ice dance – original dance: (1) Isabelle Delobel/Olivier Schoenfelder (France) 60.35, (2) Oksana Domnina/Maxim Shabalin (Russia) 59.33, (3) Federica Faiella/Massimo Scali (Italy) 57.89
    - Senior men – short program: (1) Takahiko Kozuka (Japan) 83.90, (2) Jeremy Abbott (United States) 78.26, (3) Brian Joubert (France) 74.55
    - Senior ladies – short program: (1) Kim Yuna (South Korea) 65.94 (2) Mao Asada (Japan) 65.38 (3) Yukari Nakano (Japan) 62.08
    - Senior pairs – short program: (1) Aliona Savchenko/Robin Szolkowy (Germany) 70.14 (2) Zhang Dan/Zhang Hao (China) 68.34 (3) Pang Qing/Tong Jian (China) 66.24

==== Skeleton ====
- World Cup 3 in Igls, Austria:
  - Women: (1) Shelley Rudman (United Kingdom) 1:49.75 (2) Kerstin Szymkowiak (Germany) 1:49.83 (3) Svetlana Trunova (Russia) 1:50.00
    - World Cup standings: (1) Szymkowiak (Germany) 630 (2) Anja Huber (Germany) 586 3 Katie Uhlaender (United States) 568

== December 11, 2008 (Thursday) ==
=== American football ===
- National Football League Week 15 Thursday Night Football:
  - Chicago Bears 27, New Orleans Saints 24 (OT)
    - The Bears (8–6) stay in contention for a play-off berth; the Saints were eliminated from contention with the loss.

=== Basketball ===
- Euroleague, week 7:
  (teams in **bold** advance to the Top-16 round)
  - Group A:
    - Air Avellino (Italy) 72–86 (Israel) Maccabi Tel Aviv
      - Maccabi (4–3) need one more win or Avellino (2–5) loss to qualify to the Top-16. As a result of Maccabi's win, Olympiacos (5–2) qualifies to the Top-16 and Le Mans (0–7) is eliminated.
  - Group B:
    - SLUC Nancy (France) 78–70 (Poland) Asseco Prokom Sopot
      - Nancy gets level with Sopot in 4th place on 2–5, but the Polish team hold the advantage in a tie-break due to their 29-points victory in week 2.
    - Panathinaikos Athens (Greece) 76–87 (Spain) **Regal FC Barcelona**
      - Panathinaikos (5–2) need one more win or either Sopot or Nancy loss to qualify to the Top-16.
  - Group C:
    - DKV Joventut (Spain) 97–93 (Italy) Lottomatica Roma
      - Joventut (4–3) denies Roma (5–2) a chance to clinch a berth in Top-16.
  - Group D:
    - Real Madrid (Spain) 68–67 (Serbia) Partizan Belgrade

=== Cricket ===
- England in India:
  - 1st Test in Chennai, day 1:
    - England 229/5 (Andrew Strauss 123)
- West Indies in New Zealand:
  - 1st Test in Dunedin, day 1:
    - New Zealand 226/4 (Daniel Flynn 95, Chris Gayle 3/42)

=== Football (soccer) ===
- FIFA Club World Cup in Japan:
  - Play-off:
    - **Adelaide United** (Australia) 2–1 (New Zealand) Waitakere United
      - Adelaide United will play (Japan) Gamba Osaka in the quarterfinal
- Caribbean Championship in Jamaica:
  (local time, UTC−5)
  - Semi-finals:
    - Cuba 2–2 (AET) **Grenada**
      - Grenada win 6–5 in penalty shootout.
    - **Jamaica** 2–0 Guadeloupe

=== Handball ===
- European Women's Championship in Macedonia
  (teams in **bold** advance to the semifinals)
  - Group I in Ohrid:
    - Hungary 21–23 **Spain**
    - Denmark 25–30 Ukraine
    - Romania 31–37 **Norway**
      - Final standings: Norway 9 pts, Spain, Romania 6, Hungary, Ukraine, Denmark 3.
  - Group II in Skopje:
    - Sweden 24–29 Croatia
    - **Russia** 22–27 **Germany**
    - Belarus 24–29 Macedonia
      - Final standings: Germany 9 pts, Russia 7, Croatia, Macedonia, Sweden 4, Belarus 2.

=== Swimming ===
- European Short Course Championships in Rijeka, Croatia:
  - Men:
    - 400 m freestyle: (1) Paul Biedermann (Germany) 3:37.73 (2) Massimiliano Rosolino (Italy) 3:39.33 (3) Mads Glæsner (Denmark) 3:39.77
    - 200 m backstroke: (1) Stanislav Donets (Russia) & Aschwin Wildeboer (Spain) 1:49.22 (3) Pierre Roger (France) 1:52.26
    - 200 m individual medley: (1) James Goddard (United Kingdom) 1:53.46, (2) Vytautas Janušaitis (Lithuania) 1:54.51, (3) Alan Cabello Forns (Spain) 1:55.70
    - 50 m freestyle: (1) Amaury Leveaux (France) 20.63 sec, (2) Frédérick Bousquet (France) 20.69, (3) Duje Draganja (Croatia) & Evgeny Lagunov (Russia) 21.15
      - Leveaux sets a world record of 20.48 sec in semi-final.
    - 4 × 50 m medley relay: (1) Italy (Mirco Di Tora, Alessandro Terrin, Marco Belotti, Filippo Magnini) 1:32.91 (world record), (2) Germany (Thomas Rupprath, Marco Koch, Johannes Dietrich, Steffen Deibler) & Russia (Stanislav Donets, Sergei Geybel, Evgeny Korotyshkin, Evgeny Lagunov) 1:33.31
      - Russia set a world record of 1:33.77 in a heat earlier on Thursday.
  - Women:
    - 200 m individual medley: (1) Francesca Segat (Italy) 2 min 7.03 sec (European record), (2) Evelyn Verrasztó (Hungary) 2:07.93, (3) Sophie de Ronchi (France) 2:08.10
    - 200 m butterfly: (1) Petra Granlund (Sweden) 2 min 4.27 sec, (2) Aurore Mongel (France) 2:04.73, (3) Jemma Lowe (United Kingdom) 2:04.78
    - 50 m breaststroke: (1) Valentina Artemyeva (Russia) 29.96 sec, (2) Janne Schaefer (Germany) 30.37, (3) Moniek Nijhuis (Netherlands) 30.45

=== Winter sports ===
==== Curling ====
- European Championships in Örnsköldsvik, Sweden:
  (All times CET)
  - Men:
    - Play-off:
      - (1) Germany 7–9 (2) **Norway**
        - Norway advance to the final; Germany go to the semifinal.
      - (3) **Scotland** 6–2 (4) Switzerland
        - Scotland go to the semifinal.
    - Division B play-off:
      - Italy 3–8 **Finland**
        - Finland advance to the final; Italy go to the semifinal.
      - **Hungary** 9–8 Netherlands
        - Hungary go to the semifinal.
  - Women:
    - Round 9:
      (teams in **bold** qualify to the play-off)
      - Netherlands 3–8 **Switzerland**
      - Scotland 9–4 England
      - **Germany** 6–4 Russia
      - **Denmark** 5–4 Czech Republic
      - Italy 2–9 **Sweden**
        - Final standings: Switzerland, Sweden 7–2, Denmark, Germany 6–3, Italy, Scotland 5–4, Russia 4–5, Netherlands, England 2–7, Czech Republic 1–8.
          - Top seven teams qualify to 2009 World Championship.
    - Tie break for 8th place:
      - Netherlands 6–7 **England**
        - England will play against the winner of division B for a berth in 2009 World Championship.
    - Play-off:
      - (1) **Switzerland** 8–4 (2) Sweden
        - Switzerland advance to the final; Sweden go to the semifinal.
      - (3) **Denmark** 8–7 (4) Germany
        - Denmark go to the semifinal.
    - Division B play-off:
      - Finland 6–10 **Norway**
        - Norway advance to the final; Finland go to the semifinal.
      - **Hungary** 6–4 Poland
        - Hungary go to the semifinal.

==== Figure skating ====
- Grand Prix:
  - Grand Prix Final and Junior Grand Prix Final in Goyang, South Korea:
    - Junior ice dance – original dance: (1) Madison Chock / Greg Zuerlein (United States) 51.84 (2) Ekaterina Riazanova / Jonathan Guerreiro (Russia) 50.85 (3) Alisa Agafonova / Dmitri Dun (Ukraine) 49.45
    - Junior men – short program: (1) Florent Amodio (France) 68.20 (2) Armin Mahbanoozadeh (United States) 67.05 (3) Richard Dornbush (United States) 66.50
    - Junior pairs – short program: (1) Lubov Iliushechkina / Nodari Maisuradze (Russia) 56.88 (2) Ksenia Krasilnikova / Konstantin Bezmaternikh (Russia) 51.54 (3) Anastasia Martiusheva / Alexei Rogonov (Russia) 50.60
    - Junior ladies – short program: (1) Alexe Gilles (United States) 54.24 (2) Kanako Murakami (Japan) 51.04 (3) Angela Maxwell (United States) 48.84

== December 10, 2008 (Wednesday) ==
=== Baseball ===
- According to reports from ESPN.com, CC Sabathia has signed a seven-year, US $160 million deal with the New York Yankees. The deal, averaging out to nearly $23 million/year, will make Sabathia the highest paid pitcher in baseball history.

=== Basketball ===
- Euroleague, week 7:
  (teams in **bold** advance to the Top-16 round)
  - Group A:
    - Cibona Zagreb (Croatia) 89–70 (France) Le Mans
      - Le Mans' losing streak stretches to 7 games. They will be eliminated from Top-16 if Maccabi wins on Thursday.
    - Unicaja Málaga (Spain) 60–56 (Greece) Olympiacos
      - Cibona and Unicaja get level with Olympiacos on 5–2.
  - Group B:
    - **Montepaschi Siena** (Italy) 100–93 (Lithuania) Žalgiris Kaunas
      - Siena improve to 6–1; Žalgiris remain winless, and will be eliminated if they lose to Sopot next week.
  - Group C:
    - TAU Cerámica (Spain) 101–69 (Slovenia) Union Olimpija Ljubljana
  - Group D:
    - **CSKA Moscow** (Russia) 93–61 (Greece) Panionios
      - CSKA (6–1) secures a berth in the Top-16.
    - Efes Pilsen (Turkey) 74–67 (Italy) AJ Milano

=== Football (soccer) ===
- UEFA Champions League group stage, matchday 6:
  (teams in **bold** advance to the last-16 round; teams in italics go to UEFA Cup last-32 round; teams with ~~strike~~ are eliminated from all European Cups)
  - Group E:
    - **Manchester United** (England) 2–2 (Denmark) Aalborg BK
    - ~~Celtic~~ (Scotland) 2–0 (Spain) **Villarreal**
  - Group F:
    - ~~Steaua~~ (Romania) 0–1 (Italy) Fiorentina
    - **Lyon** (France) 2–3 (Germany) **Bayern**
  - Group G:
    - **Porto** (Portugal) 2–0 (England) **Arsenal**
    - Dynamo Kyiv (Ukraine) 1–0 (Turkey) ~~Fenerbahçe~~
  - Group H:
    - **Juventus** (Italy) 0–0 (Belarus) ~~BATE Borisov~~
    - **Real Madrid** (Spain) 3–0 (Russia) Zenit St. Petersburg

=== Handball ===
- European Women's Championship in Macedonia
  (teams in **bold** advance to the semifinals; teams with ~~strike~~ are eliminated)
  - Group I in Ohrid:
    - Romania 40–32 ~~Ukraine~~
    - ~~Hungary~~ 20–34 **Norway**
    - ~~Denmark~~ 26–23 Spain
      - Norway secures a semifinal berth as a result of Spain's loss.
  - Group II in Skopje:
    - **Russia** 24–21 ~~Croatia~~
      - Russia secures a semifinal berth.
    - ~~Sweden~~ 24–23 ~~Macedonia~~
    - ~~Belarus~~ 28–28 **Germany**

=== Ice hockey ===
- Champions Hockey League Semifinals, first leg:
  - Metallurg Magnitogorsk (Russia) 1–2 (Russia) Salavat Yulaev Ufa
  - ZSC Lions (Switzerland) 6–3 (Finland) Espoo Blues

=== Winter sports ===
==== Curling ====
- European Championships in Örnsköldsvik, Sweden:
  (teams in **bold** qualify to the play-off)
  - Men:
    - Round 8:
      - Switzerland 7–4 **Norway**
        - Switzerland secures at least a tie for fourth place.
      - France 5–6 **Scotland**
        - Scotland secures a play-off berth and eliminates France.
      - Spain 2–9 Czech Republic
        - The Czechs win their 4th game in a row and remain in contention for a play-off berth.
      - **Germany** 10–2 Sweden
        - Germany secures at least a tie for first place, while Sweden is eliminated.
      - Ireland 5–11 Denmark
        - Denmark stay in contention for a play-off berth.
        - Standings with one round remaining: Germany 7–1, Norway, Scotland 6–2, Switzerland 5–3, Czech Republic, Denmark 4–4.
    - Round 9:
      - France 5–3 Czech Republic
      - **Germany** 5–7 Denmark
      - **Norway** 7–6 Sweden
      - **Scotland** 13–2 Ireland
      - **Switzerland** 14–4 Spain
        - Switzerland secures a play-off berth.
        - Final standings: Germany, Norway, Scotland 7–2, Switzerland 6–3, Denmark 5–4, Czech Republic, France 4–5, Sweden 3–6, Ireland, Spain 1–8.
          - Top seven teams qualify to 2009 World Championship. Sweden will play against the winner of division B for another berth.
  - Women:
    - Round 8:
      - Scotland 6–9 Germany
      - Switzerland 7–4 Sweden
        - Both teams secure at least a tie for a play-off berth.
      - Denmark 7–5 England
      - Netherlands 5–7 Italy
      - Russia 10–9 Czech Republic
        - Russia wins in 11 ends and stays in contention for a play-off berth.
        - Standings with one round remaining: Sweden, Switzerland 6–2, Denmark, Germany, Italy 5–3, Russia, Scotland 4–4.

== December 9, 2008 (Tuesday) ==
=== Baseball ===
- Francisco Rodríguez, who earned a record 62 saves for the Los Angeles Angels in 2008, signs a three-year, US$37 million deal to join the New York Mets.

=== Basketball ===
- Euroleague, week 7:
  - Group C:
    - ALBA Berlin (Germany) 72–63 Fenerbahçe Ülker (Turkey)
      - Both teams are level in 4th place on 3–4, with identical head-to-heat record since Fenerbahçe won their first encounter 82–73.

=== Football (soccer) ===
- UEFA Champions League group stage, matchday 6:
  (teams in **bold** advance to the last-16 round; teams in italics go to UEFA Cup last-32 round; teams with ~~strike~~ are eliminated from all European Cups)
  - Group A:
    - **Chelsea** (England) 2–1 (Romania) ~~CFR Cluj~~
    - **Roma** (Italy) 2–0 (France) Bordeaux
  - Group B:
    - **Panathinaikos** (Greece) 1–0 (Cyprus) ~~Anorthosis~~
    - Werder Bremen (Germany) 2–1 (Italy) **Internazionale**
  - Group C:
    - ~~Basel~~ (Switzerland) 0–1 (Portugal) **Sporting CP**
    - **Barcelona** (Spain) 2–3 (Ukraine) Shakhtar Donetsk
  - Group D:
    - ~~PSV Eindhoven~~ (Netherlands) 1–3 (England) **Liverpool**
    - Marseille (France) 0–0 (Spain) **Atlético Madrid**
- News: Bernd Schuster resigns as coach of Real Madrid. Juande Ramos is appointed as new coach, four days before the El Clásico against arch rival Barcelona.

=== Handball ===
- European Women's Championship in Macedonia
  - Group I in Ohrid:
    - Hungary 26–24 Ukraine
    - Romania 18–26 Spain
    - Denmark 19–31 Norway
      - Standings after 3 matches: Norway 5 points, Spain & Romania 4.

=== Winter sports ===
==== Curling ====
- European Championships in Örnsköldsvik, Sweden:
  (teams in **bold** qualify to the play-off)
  - Men:
    - Round 7:
      - Spain 1–8 Sweden
      - Ireland 4–9 **Norway**
      - Scotland 7–4 Denmark
      - Czech Republic 8–7 Switzerland
      - **Germany** 5–4 France
        - Leaders after 7 rounds (2 remaining): Germany, Norway 6–1, Scotland 5–2, Switzerland 4–3
  - Women:
    - Round 6:
      - Switzerland 9–4 Russia
      - Italy 9–7 Scotland
      - England 8–3 Czech Republic
      - Germany 13–4 Sweden
        - First defeat for Sweden.
      - Netherlands 3–7 Denmark
    - Round 7:
      - Italy 7–8 Czech Republic
      - Germany 6–7 Denmark
      - Russia 5–8 Sweden
      - Scotland 10–3 Netherlands
      - Switzerland 12–1 England
        - Leaders after 7 rounds (2 remaining): Sweden 6–1, Switzerland 5–2, Denmark, Germany, Italy, Scotland 4–3

== December 8, 2008 (Monday) ==
=== American football ===
- National Football League Week 14 Monday Night Football:
  - Carolina Panthers 38, Tampa Bay Buccaneers 23
    - The Panthers take over first place in the NFC South on the ground as DeAngelo Williams runs for 186 yards and Jonathan Stewart for 115, with each scoring two rushing touchdowns.

=== Baseball ===
- Baseball Hall of Fame balloting:
  - For the fourth consecutive election in which post-World War II players were considered, the Veterans Committee fails to elect a single player, with no player gaining more than 39 of the 48 votes required for election.
  - However, in the first election specifically for players whose careers began before World War II, second baseman Joe Gordon, best known for his years with the New York Yankees in the late 1930s and early 1940s, is elected by a special panel of the Veterans Committee.
- Other news:
  - Greg Maddux, whose 355 wins are eighth among all Major League Baseball pitchers and second to Warren Spahn among those who pitched entirely in the post-1920 live-ball era, announces his retirement.

=== Basketball ===
- NBA news: The Minnesota Timberwolves fire head coach Randy Wittman. Kevin McHale is named Wittman's replacement in an effective demotion, as McHale had been the T-Wolves' vice president of basketball operations and had the final say on all player personnel decisions. Wittman is the fourth head coach axed this season, the most in league history before Christmas.

=== Football (soccer) ===
- Caribbean Championship in Jamaica:
  - Group I:
    - Cuba 0–1 Haiti
    - Antigua and Barbuda 2–2 Guadeloupe
      - Cuba and Guadeloupe advance to the semifinals and qualify to 2009 CONCACAF Gold Cup

=== Cricket ===
- England in India:
  - News: The English team arrive to Chennai for the first Test due to start there on Thursday, after it was decided on Sunday night at the team's training camp in Abu Dhabi to continue the tour.

=== Handball ===
- European Women's Championship in Macedonia
  - Group II in Skopje:
    - Belarus 35–43 Croatia
    - Sweden 22–33 Germany
      - Germany advance to the semifinal
    - Russia 43–24 Macedonia

=== Winter sports ===
==== Curling ====
- European Championships in Örnsköldsvik, Sweden:
  - Men:
    - Round 5:
      - Czech Republic 6–3 Ireland
      - Spain 4–11 Germany
      - France 10–7 Switzerland
      - Sweden 4–8 Scotland
      - Denmark 4–9 Norway
    - Round 6:
      - Denmark 6–3 France
      - Sweden 4–9 Czech Republic
      - Ireland 3–10 Germany
      - Spain 5–6 Norway
      - Scotland 6–5 Switzerland
        - Leaders after 6 rounds: Germany, Norway 5–1, Scotland, Switzerland 4–2, Denmark, France 3–3
  - Women:
    - Round 4:
      - Denmark 6–5 Italy
      - Sweden 6–3 Czech Republic
      - Netherlands 3–6 Germany
      - England 2–9 Russia
      - Scotland 4–7 Switzerland
    - Round 5:
      - England 1–10 Sweden
      - Netherlands 6–9 Russia
      - Scotland 9–5 Denmark
      - Czech Republic 3–5 Switzerland
      - Germany 5–6 Italy
        - Leaders after 5 rounds: Sweden 5–0, Germany, Italy, Russia, Scotland, Switzerland 3–2

== December 7, 2008 (Sunday) ==
=== American football ===
- National Football League Week 14:
  - New Orleans Saints 29, Atlanta Falcons 25
  - Indianapolis Colts 35, Cincinnati Bengals 3
  - Tennessee Titans 28, Cleveland Browns 9
    - The Titans clinch the AFC South division and a first round bye.
  - Houston Texans 24, Green Bay Packers 21
  - Chicago Bears 23, Jacksonville Jaguars 10
  - Minnesota Vikings 20, Detroit Lions 16
    - The Lions losing streak stretches to 13 games.
  - Philadelphia Eagles 20, New York Giants 14
    - Despite their defeat, the Giants clinch the NFC East as a result of Dallas' loss.
  - Denver Broncos 24, Kansas City Chiefs 17
  - Miami Dolphins 16, Buffalo Bills 3, at Toronto, Ontario
    - This was the first NFL regular season game to be played in Canada.
  - New England Patriots 24, Seattle Seahawks 21
  - San Francisco 49ers 24, New York Jets 14
  - Pittsburgh Steelers 20, Dallas Cowboys 13
    - The Steelers make a 17–0 run in the fourth quarter to score their 10th win.
  - Arizona Cardinals 34, St. Louis Rams 10
    - The Cardinals clinch the NFC West title and guarantee a home game in the playoffs for the first time in the franchise history since 1947, when they played the championship at Comiskey Park.
  - Baltimore Ravens 24, Washington Redskins 10
- NCAA Bowl Championship Series:
  - Oklahoma and Florida are ranked 1–2 in the final BCS standings and will meet January 8 in the National Championship Game in Miami Gardens, Florida.
    Other BCS games: (BCS ranking in parentheses)
    - Rose Bowl: (8) Penn State vs. (5) Southern California
    - Orange Bowl: (19) Virginia Tech vs. (12) Cincinnati
    - Sugar Bowl: (6) Utah vs. (4) Alabama
    - Fiesta Bowl: (10) Ohio State vs. (3) Texas

=== Auto racing ===
- V8 Supercars:
  - NRMA Motoring & Services Grand Finale at Sydney, Australia:
    - (1) Garth Tander (Australia) (2) Craig Lowndes (Australia) (3) Rick Kelly (Australia)
  - Final standings: (1) Jamie Whincup (Australia) 3332 (2) Mark Winterbottom (Australia) 3079 (3) Tander 3048
- WRC:
  - Rally GB:
    - (1) Sébastien Loeb (France) 2:43:19.6 (2) Jari-Matti Latvala (Finland) 2:43:22.3 (3) Dani Sordo (Spain) 2:44:30.2
  - Final standings: (1) Loeb 122 (2) Mikko Hirvonen (Finland) 103 (3) Sordo 65

=== Football (soccer) ===
- U-20 Women's World Cup in Chile:
  - Third Place Playoff: France 3–5 Germany
  - Final: North Korea 1–2 United States
    - Goals by Sydney Leroux, the tournament's top scorer, and Alex Morgan, give the title to USA, who reverse the score in the U-17 Final last month.
- Caribbean Championship in Jamaica:
  - Group J:
    - **Grenada** 4–2 Barbados
    - **Jamaica** 1–1 Trinidad and Tobago
      - Jamaica and Grenada advance to the semifinals and qualify to 2009 CONCACAF Gold Cup

=== Golf ===
- LPGA Qualifying School in Daytona Beach, Florida:
  - Former NCAA champion Stacy Lewis finishes as top scorer for the five-round event. Among the 19 other golfers to earn full playing privileges on the 2009 LPGA Tour is Michelle Wie, who finishes in a tie for seventh.
- Father/Son Challenge in Champions Gate, Florida:
  - Winners: Larry Nelson and Drew Nelson

=== Handball ===
- European Women's Championship in Macedonia
  (teams in **bold** advance to the main round)
  - Group A in Skopje:
    - France 26–29 **Hungary**
    - **Denmark** 25–27 **Romania**
  - Group B in Ohrid:
    - **Spain** 24–24 **Ukraine**
    - **Norway** 34–19 Portugal

=== Rugby union ===
- Heineken Cup Pool stage, week 3:
  - Pool 1:
    - Clermont (France) 25–19 (Ireland) Munster
  - Pool 5:
    - Bath (England) 35–31 (Scotland) Glasgow Warriors

=== Winter sports ===
==== Alpine skiing ====
- Men's World Cup in Avon, Colorado, United States:
  - Giant slalom: (1) Benjamin Raich (Austria) 2 mins, 24.61 secs (2) Ted Ligety (United States) 2:24.62 (3) Aksel Lund Svindal (Norway) 2:24.71
    - Overall World Cup standings (after 7 races): (1) Svindal 345 pts, (2) Hermann Maier (Austria) 216, (3) Didier Défago (Switzerland) 198
- Women's World Cup in Lake Louise, Alberta, Canada:
  - Super giant slalom: (1) Nadia Fanchini (Italy) 1 min, 20.97 secs, (2) Fabienne Suter (Switzerland) and Andrea Fischbacher (Austria) 1:21.25
    - Overall World Cup standings (after 6 races): (1) Lindsey Vonn (United States) 358 points, (2) Tanja Poutiainen (Finland) 260, (3) Maria Riesch (Germany) 202

==== Biathlon ====
- World Cup 1 in Östersund, Sweden:
  - Men's 12.5 km pursuit: (1) Tomasz Sikora (Poland) 34:55.5 (3 penalties) (2) Ole Einar Bjørndalen (Norway) at 2.5 (3) (3) Emil Hegle Svendsen (Norway) 4.9 (3)
    - Overall World Cup standings (after three races): (1) Svendsen 156 points (2) Sikora 143 (3) Michael Greis (Germany) 130
  - Women's 10 km pursuit: (1) Martina Beck (Germany) 32:42.4 (0 penalties) (2) Ekaterina Iourieva (Russia) at 2.6 (0) (3) Svetlana Sleptsova (Russia) 29.2 (3)
    - Overall World Cup standings (after three races): (1) Kati Wilhelm (Germany) 135 points (2) Beck 128 (3) Tora Berger (Norway) 128

==== Bobsleigh ====
- World Cup 2 in Altenberg, Germany
  - Four-man: (1) Karl Angerer (Germany) 56.58 (2) André Lange (Germany) and Alexandr Zubkov (Russia) 56.77

==== Cross-country skiing ====
- World Cup in La Clusaz, France
  - Men's 4x10 km relay: (1) Norway 1:39:01.0 (2) Sweden 1:39:03.2 +02.20 (3) France 1:39:07.6 +06.60
  - Women's 4x5 km relay: (1) Finland 1:00:46.3 (2) Sweden 1:01:19.7 +33.39 (3) Norway 1:01:20.8 +34.50

==== Curling ====
- European Championships in Örnsköldsvik, Sweden:
  - Men:
    - Round 3:
      - Sweden 8–6 Denmark
      - Norway 10–3 France
      - Czech Republic 0–9 Scotland
      - Switzerland 8–3 Germany
      - Spain 7–4 Ireland
    - Round 4:
      - Norway 6–5 Scotland
      - Denmark 7–8 Switzerland
      - Sweden 10–4 Ireland
      - France 10–5 Spain
      - Czech Republic 4–9 Germany
  - Women:
    - Round 3:
      - Czech Republic 6–7 Netherlands
      - England 8–3 Germany
      - Italy 7–4 Switzerland
      - Sweden 9–8 Scotland
      - Denmark 8–1 Russia

==== Luge ====
- World Cup 2 in Sigulda, Latvia
  - Men: (1) Albert Demtschenko (Russia) (2) Armin Zöggeler (Italy) (3) David Möller (Germany)

==== Nordic combined ====
- World Cup in Trondheim, Norway:
  (position after jump competition in brackets)
  - 10 km Gundersen: (1) (1) Anssi Koivuranta (Finland) 24 mins 41.9 secs (2) (3) Björn Kircheisen (Germany) at 25.9 (3) (9) Jason Lamy-Chappuis (France) 34.6
    - World Cup standings (after 4 of 24 events): (1) Koivuranta 320 points (2) Magnus Moan (Norway) 196 (3) Ronny Ackermann (Germany) 193

==== Short track speed skating ====
- World Cup 4 in Nagano, Japan

==== Ski jumping ====
- World Cup in Trondheim, Norway:
  - Individual 131 m hill: (1) Simon Ammann (Switzerland) 280.2 points (140/135 m), (2) Matti Hautamäki (Finland) 278.3 (137/135 m), (3) Gregor Schlierenzauer (Austria) 274.8 (134.5/135 m)
    - World Cup standings (after three of 34 rounds): (1) Ammann 245 pts, (2) Schlierenzauer 220, (3) Ville Larinto (Finland) 145

==== Speed skating ====
- World Cup 4 in Changchun, China:
- Men's 100 m: (1) Yuya Oikawa (Japan) 9.45 (2) Lee Kang-Seok (South Korea) 9.61 (3) Yu Fengtong (China) 9.89
- Men's 500 m (2): (1) Dmitry Lobkov (Russia) 35.07 (2) Yu Fengtong (China) 35.09 +0.02 (3) Keiichiro Nagashima (Japan) 35.20 +0.13
- Men's 1000 m (2): (1) Simon Kuipers (Netherlands) 1:09.83 (2) Shani Davis (United States) 1:09.99 +0.16 (3) Stefan Groothuis (Netherlands) 1:10.01 +0.18
- Women's 100 m: (1) Jenny Wolf (Germany) 10.23 (2) Xing Aihua (China) 10.27 (3) Lee Sang-hwa KOR 10.67
- Women's 500 m (2): (1) Jenny Wolf (Germany) 37.98 (2) Annette Gerritsen (Netherlands) 38.52 +0.54 (3) Lee Sang-hwa (South Korea) 38.56 +0.58
- Women's 1000 m (2): (1) Laurine van Riessen (Netherlands) 1:17.25 (2) Kristina Groves (Canada) 1:17.80 +0.55 (3) Shannon Rempel (Canada) 1:18.27 +1.02

== December 6, 2008 (Saturday) ==
=== American college football ===
- NCAA Top 25:
  (BCS Ranking in parentheses)
  - SEC Championship Game in Atlanta:
    - (4) Florida 31, (1) Alabama 20
      - The Gators stop the Crimson Tide's winning streak, and will probably get a berth in the National Championship Game, while Alabama could go to the Sugar Bowl.
  - Big 12 Championship Game in Kansas City:
    - (2) Oklahoma 62, (20) Missouri 21
      - The Sooners, who hit the 60-point mark for the fifth straight week, are likely to get the top spot in the rankings and play in the Championship Game.
  - (5) Southern California 28, UCLA 7
    - The Trojans clinch the Pac-10 Championship and a return trip to the Rose Bowl on January 1 to meet Penn State.
  - (13) Cincinnati 29, Hawaiʻi 24
    - Down 24–10, the Bearcats use their defense to come back and win.
  - ACC Championship Game in Tampa:
    - (25) Virginia Tech 30, (17) Boston College 12
      - The Hokies will play in the 2009 Orange Bowl, most likely against the Bearcats.
  - (23) Pittsburgh 34, UConn 10
- In other notable D-I FBS games:
  - Conference USA Championship Game:
    - East Carolina 27, Tulsa 24
      - The Pirates win their first league title since 1976 and the trip to the Liberty Bowl against an SEC team, later determined to be Kentucky, on January 2.
  - Troy 35, Arkansas State 9
    - The Trojans win the Sun Belt Championship outright, and with it a trip to the New Orleans Bowl to meet Southern Miss.
  - Army–Navy Game in Philadelphia:
    - Navy 34, Army 0
      - The Midshipmen win the Commander-in-Chief's Trophy for the sixth consecutive year and beat the Black Knights for the seventh time in a row in the biggest shutout in the series since 1973.
  - As a result of Alabama and Ball State losses in their conference championship games, Utah and Boise State remain the only two teams with undefeated records going into the bowl post-season.
- In the NCAA Division I Football Championship:
  - Richmond 33, Appalachian State 13
    - The Mountaineers' run of three consecutive FCS championships ends in the quarterfinals, with the Spiders taking advantage of five second-half interceptions of ASU quarterback Armanti Edwards.
- Minnesota-Duluth and Northwest Missouri State University advance to the 2008 NCAA Division II National Football Championship game after defeating California University of Pennsylvania and University of North Alabama in the semifinals.

=== Auto racing ===
- V8 Supercars:
  - NRMA Motoring & Services Grand Finale at Sydney, Australia:
    - Jamie Whincup (Australia) secures his first V8 Supercars championship after winning the first of three races held over two days.

=== Boxing ===
- The Dream Match at the MGM Grand Garden, Las Vegas:
  - (Philippines) Manny Pacquiao wins with a ninth-round TKO of (United States) Oscar De La Hoya as "The Golden Boy" refuses to answer the bell after the eighth round.
  - (Puerto Rico) Juan Manuel López KOs (Argentina) Sergio Medina in the first round to retain the junior featherweight title.
  - (United States) Victor Ortíz KOs (United States) Jeff Resto in the second round.

=== Football (soccer) ===
- Caribbean Championship in Jamaica:
  - Group I:
    - **Cuba** 3–0 Antigua and Barbuda
      - Cuba advance to the semifinal and qualify to 2009 CONCACAF Gold Cup
    - Haiti 2–3 Guadeloupe

=== Handball ===
- European Women's Championship in Macedonia
  (teams in **bold** advance to the main round)
  - Group C in Ohrid:
    - **Russia** 19–19 **Sweden**
    - Austria 21–31 **Belarus**
  - Group D in Skopje:
    - **Germany** 32–27 **Croatia**
    - **Macedonia** 31–30 Serbia

=== Rugby union ===
- Heineken Cup Pool stage, week 3:
  - Pool 2:
    - Leinster (Ireland) 33–3 (France) Castres
  - Pool 3:
    - Ospreys (Wales) 68–8 (Italy) Treviso
    - Leicester Tigers (England) 38–27 (France) Perpignan
  - Pool 4:
    - Stade Français 10–15 (England) Harlequins
      - Quins win in front of a hostile crowd of 76,569 at Stade de France, the largest ever to attend a Heineken Cup pool match.
  - Pool 5:
    - Toulouse (France) 26–7 (Wales) Newport Gwent Dragons
  - Pool 6:
    - Calvisano (Italy) 17–40 (England) Gloucester
- Sevens World Series:
  - South Africa Sevens in George:
    - Cup Final: New Zealand 7–12 **South Africa**

=== Winter sports ===
==== Alpine skiing ====
- Men's World Cup in Avon, Colorado, United States:
  - Super giant slalom: (1) Aksel Lund Svindal (Norway) 1 min 13.05 secs, (2) Hermann Maier (Austria) 1:13.50, (3) Michael Walchhofer (Austria) 1:13.63
- Women's World Cup in Lake Louise, Alberta, Canada:
  - Downhill: cancelled

==== Biathlon ====
- World Cup 1 in Östersund, Sweden:
  - Men's 10 km sprint: (1) Emil Hegle Svendsen (Norway) 25 min 42.3 sec (1 penalty) (2) Tomasz Sikora (Poland) at 12.7 (1) (3) Simon Fourcade (France) 28.1 (0)
  - Women's 7.5 km sprint: (1) Wang Chunli (China) 22 min 48.1 sec (0) (2) Tora Berger (Norway) 22:49.5 +1.4 (0) (3) Magdalena Neuner (Germany) 22:52.9 +4.8 (0)

==== Bobsleigh ====
- World Cup 2 in Altenberg, Germany:
  - Two-man: (1) André Lange / Kevin Kuske (Germany) 1:52.60 (2) Steven Holcomb / Justin Olsen (United States) 1:52.85 (+0.25) (3) Beat Hefti / Thomas Lamparter (Switzerland) 1:53.11 (+0.51)
  - Two-woman: (1) Sandra Kiriasis / Berit Wiacker (Germany) 1:55.71 (2) Cathleen Martini / Janine Tischer (Germany) 1:55.73 (+0.02) (3) Shauna Rohbock / Elana Meyers (United States) 1:56.12 (+0.41)

==== Cross-country skiing ====
- World Cup in La Clusaz, France:
  - Men's 30 km freestyle mass start: (1) Petter Northug (Norway) 1 hr 19 min 26.5 sec (2) Dario Cologna (Switzerland) 1:19:26.8 (3) Alexander Legkov (Russia) 1:19:28.5
  - Women's 15 km freestyle mass start: (1) Kristin Størmer Steira (Norway) 42:56.0 (2) Aino-Kaisa Saarinen (Finland) 43:09.0 (3) Therese Johaug (Norway) 43:10.0

==== Curling ====
- European Championships in Örnsköldsvik, Sweden:
  - Men:
    - Round 1:
      - Scotland 3–6 Germany
      - Switzerland 8–4 Sweden
      - Denmark 13–1 Spain
      - Ireland 6–5 France
      - Norway 9–1 Czech Republic
    - Round 2:
      - Ireland 5–10 Switzerland
      - Scotland 13–1 Spain
      - Germany 12–8 Norway
      - Denmark 10–3 Czech Republic
      - France 8–3 Sweden
  - Women:
    - Round 1:
      - Sweden 8–2 Denmark
      - Russia 8–7 Italy
      - Czech Republic 3–10 Scotland
      - Switzerland 6–7 Germany
      - England 6–7 Netherlands
    - Round 2:
      - Russia 4–9 Scotland
      - Denmark 5–10 Switzerland
      - Sweden 12–2 Netherlands
      - Italy 9–6 England
      - Czech Republic 3–7 Germany

==== Luge ====
- World Cup 2 in Sigulda, Latvia:
  - Women: (1) (Germany) Tatjana Hüfner (2) (Ukraine) Natalia Yakushenko (3) (Germany) Anke Wischnewski
  - Doubles: (1) (Italy) Christian Oberstolz / Patrick Gruber (2) (Austria) Andreas Linger / Wolfgang Linger (3) (Austria) Peter Penz / Georg Fischler

==== Nordic combined ====
- World Cup in Trondheim, Norway:
  - 10 km Gundersen: (1) Magnus Moan (Norway) (2) Jason Lamy-Chappuis (France) (3) Anssi Koivuranta (Finland)

==== Short track speed skating ====
- World Cup 4 in Nagano, Japan:
  - Women's 1500 m: (1) Kim Min-jung (South Korea) 2:21.238 (2) Shin Sae-bom (South Korea) 2:21.369 (3) Allison Baver (United States) 2:22.046
  - Women's 1000 m: (1) Wang Meng (China) 1:30.790 (2) Liu Qiuhong (China) 1:30.976 (3) Yang Shin-young (South Korea) 1:31.098
  - Men's 1500 m: (1) Lee Jung-su (South Korea) 2:16.242 (2) Sung Si-bak (South Korea) 2:16.478 (3) François-Louis Tremblay (Canada) 2:17.073
  - Men's 1000 m: (1) Lee Ho-suk (South Korea) 1:29.171 (2) Kwak Yoon-gy (South Korea) 1:29.516 (3) Charles Hamelin (Canada) 1:29.519

==== Ski jumping ====
- World Cup in Trondheim, Norway:
  - Individual 131 m hill: (1) Gregor Schlierenzauer (Austria) 285.7 points (140.0/135.0 m), (2) Ville Larinto (Finland) 278.9 (138.5/138.0 m), (3) Anders Jacobsen (Norway) 278.8 (134.0/138.0 m)

==== Snowboarding ====
- World Cup in Grenoble, France:
  - Men's Big Air: (1) Mathieu Crepel (France) (2) Stefan Gimpl (Austria) (3) Jaakko Ruha (Finland)

==== Speed skating ====
- World Cup 4 in Changchun, China:
  - Men's 500 m (1): (1) Yu Fengtong (China) 34.97 sec (2) Keiichiro Nagashima (Japan) 35.08 +0.11 (3) Lee Kyou-Hyuk (South Korea) 35.27 +0.30
  - Men's 1000 m (1): (1) Lee Kyou-Hyuk (South Korea) 1 min 9.68 sec (2) Stefan Groothuis (Netherlands) 1:10.15 +0.47 (3) Shani Davis (United States) 1:10.32 +0.64
  - Women's 500 m (1): (1) Jenny Wolf (Germany) 38.09 sec (2) Lee Sang-hwa (South Korea) 38.71 +0.62 (3) Annette Gerritsen (Netherlands) 38.86 +0.77
  - Women's 1000 m (1): (1) Kristina Groves (Canada) 1 min 18.18 sec (2) Shannon Rempel (Canada) 1:18.20 +0.02 (3) Laurine van Riessen (Netherlands) 1:18.48 +0.30

== December 5, 2008 (Friday) ==
=== American football ===
- NCAA Top 25:
  - MAC Championship Game in Detroit:
    - Buffalo 42, (12) Ball State 24
      - The Bulls shock the previously unbeaten Cardinals and will go to Toronto for the International Bowl, the first bowl game in their history.
- News:
  - Former NFL star O. J. Simpson is sentenced to a maximum of 33 years in prison, with the possibility of parole after 9 years, after being convicted of kidnapping and robbery of two sports memorabilia dealers in Las Vegas.

=== Cricket ===
- England in India:
  - News: The England cricket team is training in Abu Dhabi, while ECB officials and a security advisor inspect the security conditions in Chennai and Mohali, the cities scheduled to host the two Test matches. The delegation is due to report its findings to the team on Sunday, and then a decision should be made whether the tour will continue with the first Test in Chennai next Thursday.

=== Football (soccer) ===
- Caribbean Championship in Jamaica:
  - Group J:
    - Barbados 1–2 Trinidad and Tobago
    - Jamaica 4–0 Grenada

=== Handball ===
- European Women's Championship in Macedonia
  (teams in **bold** advance to the main round)
  - Group A in Skopje:
    - **Romania** 30–25 France
    - **Denmark** 26–26 Hungary
  - Group B in Ohrid:
    - **Spain** 29–24 Portugal
    - **Ukraine** 20–33 **Norway**

=== Rugby union ===
- Heineken Cup Pool stage, week 3:
  - Pool 1:
    - Sale Sharks (England) 36–6 (France) Montauban
  - Pool 2:
    - Edinburtgh (Scotland) 16–25 (England) London Wasps
  - Pool 4:
    - Ulster (Ireland) 26–16 (Wales) Scarlets
  - Pool 6:
    - Cardiff Blues (Wales) 21–17 (France) Biarritz

=== Winter sports ===
==== Alpine skiing ====
- Men's World Cup in Avon, Colorado, United States:
  - Downhill: (1) Aksel Lund Svindal (Norway) 1 min 43.85 secs (2) Marco Buechel (Liechtenstein) 1:43.91 (3) Erik Guay (Canada) 1:44.20
- Women's World Cup in Lake Louise, Alberta, Canada:
  - Downhill: (1) Lindsey Vonn (United States) 1 min 26.10 secs (2) Nadia Fanchini (Italy) 1:26.71 (3) Maria Riesch (Germany) 1:26.79

==== Skeleton ====
- World Cup 2 in Altenberg, Germany:
  - Men: (1) Frank Rommel (Germany) 1:57.41 (2) Martins Dukurs (Latvia) 1:57.53 (3) Sandro Stielicke (Germany) 1:57.77
  - Women: (1) Anja Huber (Germany) 1:59.82 (2) Kerstin Szymkowiak (Germany) 1:59.95 (3) Maya Pedersen (Switzerland) 2:00.81

== December 4, 2008 (Thursday) ==
=== American football ===
- National Football League Week 14 Thursday Night Football:
  - San Diego Chargers 34, Oakland Raiders 7
    - The win keeps the Chargers in contention for the AFC West Division title or wild card playoff berth, while the Raiders are eliminated.

=== Basketball ===
- Euroleague, week 6:
  (teams in **bold** advance to the top-16 round)
  - Group A:
    - Maccabi Tel Aviv (Israel) 88–83 (Croatia) Cibona Zagreb
      - Cibona's second loss in succession means Olympiacos (5–1) have sole possession of first place in this group.
  - Group B:
    - **Regal FC Barcelona** (Spain) 91–68 (France) SLUC Nancy
      - Barça and **Montepaschi Siena** (Italy) (both 5–1) are the first clubs that secure qualification to the Top 16 stage.
    - Žalgiris Kaunas (Lithuania) 69–80 (Greece) Panathinaikos Athens
      - With this win over winless Žalgiris Panathinaikos becomes the fifth team that reaches 300 wins in EuroLeague history, following Real Madrid, CSKA Moscow, Maccabi Tel Aviv and FC Barcelona. Panathinaikos (5–1) still need another win or a Nancy loss to advance.
  - Group C:
    - Fenerbahçe Ülker (Turkey) 69–81 (Spain) TAU Cerámica
    - Union Olimpija Ljubljana (Slovenia) 65–86 (Spain) DKV Joventut
    - Lottomatica Roma (Italy) 70–64 (Germany) ALBA Berlin
      - Roma (5–1) lead the group ahead of TAU (4–2)

=== Football (soccer) ===
- UEFA Cup group stage, matchday 4:
  (teams in **bold** advance to the last-32 round; teams with ~~strike~~ are eliminated)
  - Group E:
    - **Wolfsburg** (Germany) 3–2 (England) ~~Portsmouth~~
    - ~~Heerenveen~~ (Netherlands) 1–2 (Portugal) **Braga**
    - Idle: **Milan** (Italy)
  - Group F:
    - ~~Slavia Prague~~ (Czech Republic) 0–2 (Germany) **Hamburg**
    - **Aston Villa** (England) 1–2 (Slovakia) ~~Žilina~~
    - Idle: **Ajax Amsterdam** (Netherlands)
  - Group G:
    - **Valencia** (Spain) 1–1 (Belgium) Club Brugge
    - Copenhagen (Denmark) 1–1 (Norway) ~~Rosenborg~~
    - Idle: **Saint-Étienne** (France)
  - Group H:
    - Lech Poznań (Poland) 1–1 (Spain) Deportivo La Coruña
    - Nancy (France) 3–4 (Russia) **CSKA Moscow**
      - CSKA secure first place in the group behind a hat-trick from Vágner Love.
    - Idle: ~~Feyenoord~~ (Netherlands)
- U-20 Women's World Cup in Chile:
  - Semifinals:
    - France 1–2 **North Korea**
      - Ri Ye Gyong's winning goal 3 minutes into injury time puts North Korea one match away from defending its title.
    - **United States** 1–0 Germany
      - Sydney Leroux's fifth goal in the tournament sets up a repeat of the recent U-17 Women's World Cup Final.
- Caribbean Championship in Jamaica:
  - Group I:
    - Guadeloupe 1–2 Cuba
    - Haiti 1–1 Antigua and Barbuda

=== Handball ===
- European Women's Championship in Macedonia:
  (All times CET; teams in **bold** advance to the main round)
  - Group C in Ohrid:
    - Austria 10–24 **Sweden**
    - Belarus 25–29 **Russia**
  - Group D in Skopje:
    - Serbia 31–32 **Germany**
    - Macedonia 31–29 **Croatia**

=== Winter sports ===
==== Biathlon ====
- World Cup 1 in Östersund, Sweden:
  - Women's 15 km individual: (1) Helena Jonsson (Sweden) 45:05.1 (0+0+0+0) (2) Kati Wilhelm (Germany) 45:44.8 (1+0+0+0) Ekaterina Iourieva (Russia) 46:15.4 (0+0+1+0)

== December 3, 2008 (Wednesday) ==
=== American college football ===
- Louisiana–Lafayette 42, Middle Tennessee 28
  - With the win, the Ragin' Cajuns become bowl eligible, and will win the Sun Belt championship and a trip to the New Orleans Bowl if Troy loses to Arkansas State on Saturday.
- News:
  - Tommy Tuberville resigns as Auburn head coach.
  - Notre Dame announces Charlie Weis will stay on as head coach at least through the 2009 season.

=== Basketball ===
- Euroleague, week 6:
  - Group A:
    - Olympiacos (Greece) 91–66 (Italy) Air Avellino
    - Le Mans (France) 55–87 (Spain) Unicaja Málaga
      - Olympiacos improve to 5–1, while Le Mans remain winless
  - Group B:
    - Asseco Prokom Sopot (Poland) 71–83 (Italy) Montepaschi Siena
      - Siena also improve to 5–1
  - Group D:
    - Panionios (Greece) 68–66 (Spain) Real Madrid
    - Partizan Belgrade (Serbia) 83–77 (Turkey) Efes Pilsen
    - AJ Milano (Italy) 80–79 (Russia) CSKA Moscow
      - CSKA suffer its first defeat.
- NBA news: The Toronto Raptors fire Sam Mitchell as head coach, making him the league's third head coach axed this season. His interim replacement is assistant Jay Triano, the first Canadian coach in NBA history.

=== Football (soccer) ===
- Copa Sudamericana final, second leg:
  (first leg result in parentheses)
  - Internacional (Brazil) 1(1)–1(0) (Argentina) Estudiantes
    - Nilmar's goal 6 minutes from the end of extra time gives Internacional a 2–1 win on aggregate
- UEFA Cup group stage, matchday 4:
  (teams in **bold** advance to the last-32 round; teams with ~~strike~~ are eliminated)
  - Group A:
    - **Twente Enschede** (Netherlands) 2–1 (Germany) Schalke 04
    - **Manchester City** (England) 0–0 (France) Paris Saint-Germain
    - Idle: Racing Santander (Spain)
  - Group B:
    - Hertha Berlin (Germany) 0–1 (Turkey) **Galatasaray**
    - **Metalist Kharkiv** (Ukraine) 1–0 (Greece) Olympiacos Piraeus
    - Idle: Benfica (Portugal)
  - Group C:
    - Sevilla (Spain) 3–0 (Serbia) ~~Partizan Belgrade~~
    - **Standard Liège** (Belgium) 3–0 (Italy) Sampdoria
    - Idle: Stuttgart (Germany)
  - Group D:
    - Spartak Moscow (Russia) 1–2 (Netherlands) NEC Nijmegen
    - **Udinese** (Italy) 2–1 (Croatia) Dinamo Zagreb
    - Idle: Tottenham Hotspur (England)
- Caribbean Championship in Jamaica:
  - Group J:
    - Trinidad and Tobago 1–2 Grenada
    - Jamaica 2–1 Barbados

=== Handball ===
- European Women's Championship in Macedonia:
  - Group A in Skopje:
    - Hungary 21–27 Romania
    - France 23–24 Denmark
  - Group B in Ohrid:
    - Portugal 24–38 Ukraine
    - Norway 21–21 Spain

=== Ice hockey ===
- Champions Hockey League:
  - Group stage, matchday 6:
    (teams in **bold** advance to the semifinals)
    - Group A: Eisbären Berlin (Germany) 2–1 (Russia) **Metallurg Magnitogorsk**
    - Group B: HV71 (Sweden) 0–6 (Finland) **Espoo Blues**
    - Group C: **Salavat Yulaev Ufa** (Russia) 8–2 (Slovakia) HC Slovan Bratislava
    - Group D: HC Slavia Praha (Czech Republic) 1–5 (Switzerland) **ZSC Lions**

=== Rugby union ===
- End of year tests:
  - Barbarians 11–18 Australia in London

=== Winter sports ===
==== Biathlon ====
- World Cup 1 in Östersund, Sweden:
  - Men's 20 km individual: (1) Michael Greis (Germany) 58:52.5 (0+1+0+0) (2) Alexander Os (Norway) 59:43.0 (0+0+0+2) (3) Emil Hegle Svendsen (Norway) 59:47.5 (0+2+0+0)

== December 2, 2008 (Tuesday) ==
=== American football ===
- NFL news:
  - The New York Giants suspend Plaxico Burress for the remainder of the season, a day after he was charged with felony weapons possession stemming from an incident in which he accidentally shot himself.

=== Handball ===
- European Women's Championship in Macedonia:
  - Group C in Ohrid:
    - Sweden 21–21 Belarus
    - Russia 31–22 Austria
  - Group D in Skopje:
    - Croatia 30–26 Serbia
    - Germany 25–22 Macedonia

== December 1, 2008 (Monday) ==
=== American football ===
- National Football League Week 13 Monday Night Football:
    - Houston Texans 30, Jacksonville Jaguars 17
  - News:
    - New York Giants wide receiver Plaxico Burress is charged with two felony counts of weapons possession, three days after accidentally shooting himself in the right thigh at a Manhattan nightclub.
- College football news:
  - Tennessee names Lane Kiffin head coach of the Volunteers.
  - Dabo Swinney will become permanent head coach of the Clemson Tigers.

=== Cricket ===
- New Zealand in Australia:
  - 2nd Test in Adelaide, day 4:
    - New Zealand 270 (98.3 overs) & 203 (74.1 overs); Australia 535 (157.4 overs). Australia win by an innings and 62 runs and win the series 2–0.

=== Football (soccer) ===
- U-20 Women's World Cup in Chile:
  - Quarterfinals:
    - Japan 1–2 North Korea
      - Defending champion North Korea win the all-Asian battle and earn a semifinal match against France.
    - Brazil 2–3 Germany
      - Twins Sylvie and Nicole Banecki score a goal each for Germany, that eliminate the reigning bronze medallists and will next play USA in a repeat of 2002 and 2004 semifinals. On the previous two occasions, the winner went on to win the title.
