= West Indian cricket team in New Zealand in 2008–09 =

West Indies cricket team

	New Zealand	West Indies
- Dates: 5 December 2008 – 13 January 2009
Captains	Daniel Vettori	Chris Gayle

Test series
- Result: 2-match series drawn 0–0
Most runs	Jesse Ryder (205)	Chris Gayle (305)
Most wickets	Daniel Vettori (10)	Fidel Edwards (11)

One Day International series
- Results: New Zealand won the 5-match series 2–1
Most runs	Ross Taylor (187)	Chris Gayle (260)
Most wickets	Kyle Mills (7)	Daren Powell (7)

Twenty20 International series
- Results: 2-match series drawn 1–1
Most runs	Jesse Ryder (74)	Chris Gayle (68)
Most wickets	Daniel Vettori (5)	Chris Gayle (4)

The West Indies cricket team toured New Zealand between 5 December 2008, and 13 January 2009. They played two Test matches, two Twenty20 Internationals (T20Is) and five One Day Internationals (ODIs) against the hosts, plus a three-day match against State Championship side Auckland. This was the first series between the sides since the West Indies toured New Zealand in 2005–06; their previous meeting was in the Super 8 stage of the 2007 Cricket World Cup.

== New Zealand cricket team ==
The New Zealand side had just returned from the first leg of a tour to Australia where they played two Test matches against the hosts, losing both. Prior to the second test against Australia, Andy Moles was announced as the replacement for retiring New Zealand coach John Bracewell with the West Indian series to be his first in charge of the team. One of his first moves was to replace a number of support staff and insist that he and captain Daniel Vettori be "the only voices in the dressing room". He also switched the roles of batsmen Daniel Flynn and Jesse Ryder, deciding that Flynn was better suited to the number 3 position and Ryder to the number 5.

At the start of the Test series, the New Zealand team were eighth on the ICC Test Championship rankings.

== West Indian cricket team ==
The West Indies had recently lost all three matches of an ODI series against Pakistan. Their previous Test series was at home to Australia in May and June 2008, when they lost two Tests and drew one. At the beginning of the Test series, they were ranked seventh in the ICC Test Championship, one spot higher than New Zealand.

== Squads ==
The New Zealand team for the Test series was announced on 6 December while the West Indies named their side on 5 November.

Test series
New Zealand	West Indies
Daniel Vettori	Chris Gayle
Jamie How	Carlton Baugh, Jr.
Tim McIntosh	Daren Powell
Daniel Flynn	Jerome Taylor
Ross Taylor	Xavier Marshall
Jesse Ryder	Brendan Nash
Jacob Oram	Shivnarine Chanderpaul
Brendon McCullum	Ramnaresh Sarwan
James Franklin	Sewnarine Chattergoon
Mark Gillespie	Leon Johnson
Iain O'Brien	Fidel Edwards
Jeetan Patel	Kemar Roach
	Sulieman Benn
	Denesh Ramdin
	Lionel Baker

== First leg ==
=== Tour match ===
5–7 December
Scorecard

Auckland (New Zealand)	v	West Indians
587/7 declared (156.1 overs); Richard Jones 201 (330); Gareth Hopkins 103* (182); Fidel Edwards 3/125 (29 overs)		431/7 (121 overs); Ramnaresh Sarwan 158 (198); Lance Shaw 2/44 (7 overs)

Match drawn
Eden Park Outer Oval, Auckland, New Zealand
Umpires: Barry Frost and Derek Walker

The only warm-up match for the West Indies was a three-day match against State Championship side Auckland. Having lost the toss and been put in to field on a batting-friendly pitch, the West Indian bowlers could only manage two wickets on the first day. Auckland reached 359/2 at stumps with Richard Jones leading the way on 186 not out. On day two Jones continued on to his maiden first-class double century before being dismissed for 201. The Auckland side continued batting until just before tea, declaring at 587/7 once Gareth Hopkins had brought up his century. At stumps on the second day, the West Indian team had reached 82 without losing a wicket. They batted throughout the final day, finishing on a score of 431/7. Ramnaresh Sarwan made the highest score for the West Indians, retiring out on a score of 158. Auckland captain Jones said that they had batted for so long before declaring because he felt that the West Indies weren't going to push for a result either. West Indian fast bowler Fidel Edwards said that the pitch had been "tiring to bowl on" but was a good workout for the bowlers prior to the Test series.

=== Test Series ===
==== 1st Test ====
11–15 December
Scorecard

New Zealand	v	West Indies
365 (116 overs); Daniel Flynn 95 (188); Chris Gayle 3/42 (21 overs)		340 (100 overs); Jerome Taylor 106 (107); Daniel Vettori 6/56 (25 overs)
44/2 (10 overs); Tim McIntosh 24* (35); Daren Powell 2/17 (5 overs)

Match drawn
University Oval, Dunedin, New Zealand
Umpires: Mark Benson and Amiesh Saheba
Player of the match: Jerome Taylor

- Rain prevented any play occurring on Day 2. The wet outfield delayed play on Day 3. Play was abandoned on Day 5 due to rain.

On the day prior to the start of the first Test Jacob Oram suffered a calf strain and was unable to recover with Kyle Mills being flown in to replace him. Daniel Vettori won the toss for New Zealand and decided to bat first. The new opening partnership – New Zealand's 18th in 36 Tests – had only put on ten runs before Jamie How got out. Daniel Flynn and Tim McIntosh put on a partnership of 87 until McIntosh was dismissed after lunch followed by Ross Taylor falling to an injudicious shot. Flynn became the first New Zealander to be dismissed under the experimental review system, being given out LBW for 95; when bad light stopped play early, New Zealand were 226/4. There was no action on the second day of the match with the umpires calling off play due to rain. A further session was lost on the third day while the ground was dried, with play beginning at 2:45 pm (just over 3 hours after the scheduled start). Brendon McCullum and Jesse Ryder began well but were both dismissed shortly after the West Indies took the new ball. After some resistance from the final batsmen, New Zealand were dismissed for 365. The West Indian opening batsmen negotiated the 14 overs remaining in the day to be 39 without loss at stumps.

==== 2nd Test ====
19–23 December
Scorecard

West Indies	v	New Zealand
307 (107 overs); Shivnarine Chanderpaul 126* (282); Iain O'Brien 6/75 (26 overs)		371 (126.4 overs); Tim McIntosh 136 (337); Fidel Edwards 7/87 (29.4 overs)
375 (145 overs); Chris Gayle 197 (396); Jeetan Patel 5/110 (46 overs)		220/5 (51 overs); Jesse Ryder 59* (99); Jerome Taylor 2/67 (13 overs)

Match drawn
McLean Park, Napier, New Zealand
Umpires: Rudi Koertzen and Amiesh Saheba
Player of the match: Chris Gayle

== Second leg ==
=== Twenty20 Series ===
==== 1st Twenty20 ====
26 December
Scorecard

New Zealand; 155/7 (20 overs)	v	West Indies; 155/8 (20 overs)
Ross Taylor 63 (50); Chris Gayle 2/16 (3 overs)		Chris Gayle 67 (41); Daniel Vettori 3/16 (4 overs)

Scores level; West Indies won the Super Over
Eden Park, Auckland
Umpires: Billy Bowden and Tony Hill
Player of the match: Chris Gayle

- New Zealand won the toss and elected to bat.
- This was the first ever cricket match with Super Over after the match ended a tie.

==== 2nd Twenty20 ====
28 December
Scorecard

New Zealand; 191/9 (20 overs)	v	West Indies; 155/7 (20 overs)
Jesse Ryder 62 (41); Chris Gayle 2/27 (4 overs)		Ramnaresh Sarwan 53 (36); Jeetan Patel 2/12 (2 overs)

New Zealand won by 36 runs
Seddon Park, Hamilton, New Zealand
Umpires: Gary Baxter and Evan Watkin
Player of the match: Jesse Ryder

=== ODI Series ===
==== 1st ODI ====
31 December
Scorecard

West Indies; 129/5 (35.4 overs)	v	New Zealand
Ramnaresh Sarwan 38 (57); Tim Southee 2/33 (7.4 overs)

No result
Queenstown Events Centre, Queenstown, New Zealand
Umpires: Mark Benson and Tony Hill

- Rain stopped play after 35.4 overs of the West Indies innings.

==== 2nd ODI ====
3 January
Scorecard

New Zealand; 152/8 (28 overs)	v	West Indies; 158/5 (27.5 overs)
Jesse Ryder 32 (43); Fidel Edwards 3/26 (6 overs)		Ramnaresh Sarwan 67* (65); Jacob Oram 1/25 (5 overs)

West Indies won by 5 wickets (D/L method)
AMI Stadium, Christchurch, New Zealand
Umpires: Gary Baxter and Mark Benson
Player of the match: Ramnaresh Sarwan

- Rain stopped play for four hours after 6.5 overs of the New Zealand innings; match reduced to 28 overs each.

==== 3rd ODI ====
7 January
Scorecard

West Indies; 128 (28 overs)	v	New Zealand; 129/3 (20.3 overs)
Shivnarine Chanderpaul 45 (77); Daniel Vettori 4/20 (10 overs)		Ross Taylor 51 (50); Daren Powell 3/25 (7 overs)

New Zealand won by 7 wickets
Westpac Stadium, Wellington, New Zealand
Umpires: Mark Benson and Tony Hill
Player of the match: Daniel Vettori

==== 4th ODI ====
10 January
Scorecard

New Zealand; 275/4 (50 overs)	v	West Indies; 64/0 (10.3 overs)
Martin Guptill 122* (135); Lionel Baker 2/29 (10 overs)		Chris Gayle 46* (37)

No result
Eden Park, Auckland, New Zealand
Umpires: Mark Benson and Gary Baxter

- Rain stopped play after 10.3 overs of the West Indies innings with a revised target of 235 runs from 40 overs.
- Martin Guptill (NZ) made his ODI debut.

==== 5th ODI ====
13 January
Scorecard

West Indies; 293/9 (50 overs)	v	New Zealand; 211/5 (35 overs)
Chris Gayle 135 (129); Mark Gillespie 4/58 (10 overs)		Ross Taylor 48* (71); Darren Powell 3/66 (10)

New Zealand win by 9 runs(D/L)
McLean Park, Napier, New Zealand
Umpires: Mark Benson and Tony Hill
Player of the match: Chris Gayle

- Rain stopped play after 35 overs of New Zealand's innings.
