= English cricket team in India in 2008–09 =

	India	England
- Dates: 9 November – 23 December 2008
Captains	Mahendra Singh Dhoni	Kevin Pietersen

Test series
- Result: India won the 2-match series 1–0
Most runs	Gautam Gambhir (361)	Andrew Strauss (252)
Most wickets	Zaheer Khan (8) Harbhajan Singh (8)	Graeme Swann (8)
- Player of the series: Zaheer Khan

One Day International series
- Results: India won the 7-match series 5–0
Most runs	Yuvraj Singh (325)	Owais Shah (236)
Most wickets	Yuvraj Singh (8)	Stuart Broad (7)
- Player of the series: Yuvraj Singh

The England cricket team toured India from 9 November 2008 to 23 December 2008 and played 2 Test matches and 5 One Day Internationals (ODIs).

Following the attacks in Mumbai on 26 November, the final 2 ODIs against India were cancelled, India taking the series 5–0.

As a result of the Mumbai Attacks the Test matches were moved from Ahmedabad and Mumbai to Chennai and Mohali. England flew home initially and then attended a training camp in Abu Dhabi. On 7 December the England team decided to participate in the 2 match Test series and arrived in Chennai the next day. At Chennai, Andrew Strauss hit 123 and 108, strokeful for the former England skipper. Sachin Tendulkar slammed 103*, with Yuvraj Singh at 85*, chased the record target of 387, guiding India to a victory by 6 wickets.

== ODI series ==
India won the series 5–0. The last 2 scheduled ODIs were cancelled, following the attacks in Mumbai. The player of the series was Yuvraj Singh, who hit 2 centuries, on his way to 325 runs at an average of 65.00. India secured large winning margins in the first 3 matches, and the last. The fourth and closest match included a controversial application of the Duckworth-Lewis method, prompting the England camp to suggest a rethink of its methodologies.

=== 1st ODI ===
14 November 2008
Scorecard

India; 387/5 (50 overs)	v	England; 229 (37.4 overs)
Yuvraj Singh 138 (78); Steve Harmison 2/75 (10 overs)		Kevin Pietersen 63 (56); Zaheer Khan 3/26 (7 overs)

India won by 158 runs
Madhavrao Scindia Cricket Ground, Rajkot
Umpires: Amiesh Saheba (IND) & Russell Tiffin (ZIM)
Player of the match: Yuvraj Singh.

=== 2nd ODI ===
17 November 2008
Scorecard

India; 292/9 (50 overs)	v	England; 238 (47 overs)
Yuvraj Singh 118 (122); Stuart Broad 4/55 (10 overs)		Owais Shah 58 (78); Yuvraj Singh 4/28 (10 overs)

India won by 54 runs
Maharani Usharaje Trust Cricket Ground, Indore
Umpires: Amiesh Saheba (IND) & Russell Tiffin (ZIM)
Player of the match: Yuvraj Singh

=== 3rd ODI ===
20 November 2008
Sorecard

England; 240 (48.4 overs)	v	India; 198/5 (40 overs)
Ravi Bopara 60 (82); Harbhajan Singh 3/31 (10 overs)		Virender Sehwag 68 (76); Andrew Flintoff 3/31 (9 overs)

India won by 16 runs (D/L)
Green Park, Kanpur
Umpires: Amiesh Saheba (IND) & Russell Tiffin (ZIM)
Player of the match: Harbhajan Singh

=== 4th ODI ===
23 November 2008
Scorecard

India; 166/4 (22 overs)	v	England; 178/8 (22 overs)
Virender Sehwag 69 (57); Graeme Swann 2/21 (2 overs)		Owais Shah 72 (48); Zaheer Khan 2/20 (5 overs)

India won by 19 runs (D/L)
M Chinnaswamy Stadium, Bangalore
Umpires: Amiesh Saheba (IND) & Daryl Harper (AUS)
Player of the match: Virender Sehwag

=== 5th ODI ===
26 November 2008
Scorecard

England; 270/4 (50 overs)	v	India; 273/4 (43.4 overs)
Kevin Pietersen 111* (128); Zaheer Khan 2/60 (10 overs)		Virender Sehwag 91 (73); Ravi Bopara 1/42 (6 overs)

India won by 6 wickets
Barabati Stadium, Cuttack
Umpires: Amiesh Saheba (IND) & Daryl Harper (AUS)
Player of the match: Virender Sehwag

- 2 further ODIs were scheduled for Guwahati (29 November) and Delhi (2 December) but were cancelled for security reasons following the 2008 Mumbai attacks.

== Test series ==
=== 1st Test ===
11–15 December 2008
Scorecard

England	v	India
316 (128.4 overs); Andrew Strauss 123 (233); Harbhajan Singh 3/96 (38 overs)		241 (69.4 overs); Mahendra Singh Dhoni 53 (82); Andrew Flintoff 3/49 (18.4 overs)
311/9d (105.5 overs); Andrew Strauss 108 (244); Paul Collingwood 108 (250); Zaheer Khan 3/40 (27 overs)		387/4 (98.3 overs); Sachin Tendulkar 103* (196); Graeme Swann 2/103 (28.3 overs)

India won by 6 wickets
MA Chidambaram Stadium, Chennai
Umpires: Billy Bowden (NZ) and Daryl Harper (Aus)
Player of the match: Virender Sehwag (Ind)

- England won the toss and elected to bat.
- Graeme Swann (Eng) made his Test debut.
- Sachin Tendulkar (Ind) became the second batsman to score 2,000 Test runs against England.

=== 2nd Test ===
19–23 December 2008
Scorecard

India	v	England
453 (158.2 overs); Gautam Gambhir 179 (348); Andrew Flintoff 3/54 (30.2 overs)		302 (83.5 overs); Kevin Pietersen 144 (201); Harbhajan Singh 4/68 (20.5 overs)
251/7d (73 overs); Gautam Gambhir 97 (229); Monty Panesar 1/44 (10 overs)		64/1 (28 overs); Ian Bell 24* (70); Ishant Sharma 1/7 (5 overs)

Match drawn
Punjab Cricket Association Stadium, Mohali
Umpires: Asad Rauf (Pak) and Daryl Harper (Aus)
Player of the match: Gautam Gambhir (Ind)

- India won the toss and elected to bat.
- The Test matches were originally scheduled for Ahmedabad and Mumbai but were moved to Chennai and Mohali following the 2008 Mumbai attacks.

== Tour Matches ==
=== Mumbai XI vs England XI ===
9 November 2008
Scorecard

England; 297/4 (50 overs)	v	Mumbai XI; 175/8 (50 overs)
Andrew Flintoff 100* (85); Vineet Sinha 1/32 (6.2 overs)		Abhijit Shetye 50 (118); James Anderson 3/15 (8 overs)

England XI won by 122 runs
Brabourne Stadium, Mumbai
Umpires: Amiesh Saheba & MR Singh

- 12 players per side (11 batting, 11 fielding)

=== Mumbai Cricket Association XI vs England XI ===
11 November 2008
Scorecard

Mumbai Cricket Association XI; 222/7 (50 overs)	v	England; 98 (25 overs)
Sushant Marathe 65 (98); Steve Harmison 2/38 (10 overs)		Graeme Swann 24* (31); Kshemal Waingankar 5/37 (8 overs)

Mumbai Cricket Association XI won by 124 runs
Brabourne Stadium, Mumbai
Umpires: Amiesh Saheba & MR Singh

- Players per side: Mumbai 13 (11 batting, 11 fielding); England 12 (11 batting, 11 fielding)
- A first class tour match was also planned but was cancelled following the 2008 Mumbai attacks
