= Tim McIntosh (cricketer) =

New Zealand cricketer (born 1979)

Personal information
- Full name: Timothy Gavin McIntosh
- Born: 4 December 1979 (age 46); Auckland, Auckland Region, New Zealand
- Height: 6 ft 3 in (1.91 m)
- Batting: Left-handed
- Role: Batsman

International information
- National side: New Zealand (2008–2011)
- Test debut (cap 242): 11 December 2008 v West Indies
- Last Test: 9 January 2011 v Pakistan

Domestic team information
- Years: Team
- 1998/99–2003/04: Auckland
- 2004/05: Canterbury
- 2005/06–2013/14: Auckland

Career statistics
Competition	Test	FC	LA
Matches	17	131	53
Runs scored	854	7,169	1,545
Batting average	27.54	34.13	30.29
100s/50s	2/4	19/33	3/8
Top score	136	268	161
Balls bowled	0	346	0
Wickets	–	0	–
Bowling average	–	–	–
5 wickets in innings	–	–	–
10 wickets in match	–	–	–
Best bowling	–	–	–
Catches/stumpings	10/–	130/–	28/–
- Source: Cricinfo, 4 May 2017

Timothy Gavin McIntosh (born 4 December 1979) is a New Zealand former international cricketer who played for the Auckland cricket team. He had one unsuccessful season for the Canterbury cricket team averaging only 4.90.

He was born in Auckland. He has also played for Scottish side, Greenock for season 2007–2008 performing admirably with five centuries.

== International career ==
On his New Zealand debut, it took McIntosh 38 deliveries to score his first runs in Tests. However, he impressed in his second Test, scoring a patient 136, his maiden Test century, to help New Zealand secure a draw against the West Indies.

The 2010 tour of India started disastrously for McIntosh, when he scored a pair in the first Test at Ahmedabad. However, he bounced back and scored a patient 102 in the next Test at Hyderabad, becoming only the 11th batsman in the game to score a century after getting a pair in the previous match.
