= October 2008 in sports =

<<	October 2008					>>
Su	Mo	Tu	We	Th	Fr	Sa
			1	2	3	4
5	6	7	8	9	10	11
12	13	14	15	16	17	18
19	20	21	22	23	24	25
26	27	28	29	30	31
Sports

This list shows notable sports-related deaths, events, and notable outcomes that occurred in October of 2008.

== Deaths ==
- 10: Sid Hudson
- 13: Alexei Cherepanov
- 15: Tom Tresh
- 15: Chris Mims
- 17: Nick Weatherspoon
- 20: Gene Hickerson
- 20: David Myers
- 26: Pablo Montes
- 27: Heinz Krügel
- 30: Valentin Bubukin

== Current sporting seasons ==
=== American football ===
- 2008 NFL season
- NCAA Division I FBS

=== Auto racing 2008 ===
- Formula 1
- Sprint Cup
- Nationwide
- Craftsman Truck
- World Rally Championship
- FIA GT
- WTCC
- V8 Supercar
- Superleague Formula
- A1 Grand Prix
- GP2 Asia Series

=== Baseball 2008 ===
- Nippon Professional Baseball
- Major League Baseball

=== Basketball 2008 ===
- NBA
- Euroleague
- Philippine Basketball Association
  - Philippine Cup

=== Canadian football ===
- Canadian Football League

=== Football (soccer) ===
- 2007–08
  - Ecuador
- 2008
  - Brazil
  - Japan
  - MLS
  - Norway
  - Sweden
  - AFC (Asia) Champions League
  - CAF (Africa) Champions League
- 2008–09
  - England
  - Germany
  - Italy
  - Spain
  - France
  - Argentina
  - UEFA (Europe) Champions League
  - UEFA Cup
  - 2010 FIFA World Cup Qualifying

=== Golf 2008 ===
- PGA Tour
- European Tour
- LPGA Tour

=== Ice hockey ===
- National Hockey League
- Kontinental Hockey League

=== Motorcycle racing 2008 ===
- Superbike

=== Rugby union 2008–09 ===
- Heineken Cup
- English Premiership
- Celtic League
- Top 14

=== Winter sports ===
- Alpine skiing world cup

=== October 31, 2008 (Friday) ===
==== Cricket ====
- Australia in India:
  - 3rd Test in New Delhi, day 3:
    - India 613/7d; Australia 338/4. Australia trail by 275 runs with 6 wickets remaining in the 1st innings
- Kenya in South Africa:
  - 1st ODI in Bloemfontein:
    - South Africa 336/7 (50 ov) def. Kenya 177 (49.1 ov) by 159 runs. **South Africa lead 2-match series 1–0**
- ICC Intercontinental Cup Final in Port Elizabeth, South Africa, day 2:
  - Namibia 250 and 14/2; Ireland 195/9. Namibia led by 69 runs with 8 wickets remaining

==== Rugby league ====
- Rugby League World Cup in Australia:
  - Group C: Tonga 12–20 Samoa in Penrith

=== October 30, 2008 (Thursday) ===
==== American College football ====
- NCAA BCS Top 25:
  - Cincinnati 24, (23) South Florida 10

==== Basketball ====
- Euroleague, week 2:
  - Group A: Olympiacos (Greece) 83–72 (Spain) Unicaja Málaga
  - Group A: Maccabi Tel Aviv (Israel) 90–83 (Italy) Air Avellino
  - Group A: Le Mans (France) 54–58 (Croatia) Cibona Zagreb
  - Group B: Žalgiris Kaunas (Lithuania) 67–93 (Italy) Montepaschi Siena
  - Group B: Regal Barcelona (Spain) 90–66 (Greece) Panathinaikos
  - Group C: Fenerbahçe Ülker (Turkey) 82–73 (Germany) ALBA Berlin
  - Group C: Olimpija Ljubljana (Slovenia) 90–91 (Spain) TAU Cerámica
  - Group C: Lottomatica Roma (Italy) 85–71 (Spain) DKV Joventut

==== Cricket ====
- Australia in India:
  - 3rd Test in New Delhi, day 2:
    - India 613/7d, Australia 50/0. Australia trail by 563 runs with 10 wickets remaining in the 1st innings
      - Gautam Gambhir (206) and V V S Laxman (200 not out) become the first Indian players to score double centuries in one test innings.
- ICC Intercontinental Cup Final in Port Elizabeth, South Africa, day 1:
  - Namibia 241/9 vs Ireland

==== Football (soccer) ====
- U-17 Women's World Cup in New Zealand
  - Group C: Japan 3–2 United States
  - Group C: France 6–2 Paraguay
  - Group D: Brazil 0–3 England
  - Group D: South Korea 1–2 Nigeria
- Women's Euro 2009 qualifying playoff, second leg:
  (aggregate score in parentheses; teams in **bold** advance to the final tournament)
  - **Russia** 1(4)–2(4) Scotland
    - Russia advance on away goals rule
  - **Ukraine** 2(5)–0(0) Slovenia
  - **Iceland** 3(4)–0(1) Republic of Ireland
  - **Netherlands** 2(4)–0(0) Spain

=== October 29, 2008 (Wednesday) ===
==== Baseball ====
- Major League Baseball Postseason:
  - 2008 World Series:
    - Completion of Game 5: Philadelphia Phillies 4, Tampa Bay Rays 3. **Phillies win series 4–1.**
      - Pedro Feliz's seventh-inning single scored pinch runner Eric Bruntlett with the eventual winning run, and the Phillies claim Philadelphia's first major sports title since the 1982–83 Philadelphia 76ers. Pitcher Cole Hamels is named MVP.

==== Basketball ====
- Euroleague, week 2:
  - Group B: Asseco Prokom Sopot (Poland) 91–62 (France) Nancy
    - Nancy outscored 59–31 in second half for their second lopsided defeat
  - Group D: Panionios (Greece) 52–86 (Russia) CSKA Moscow
  - Group D: Partizan Belgrade (Serbia) 81–77 (Spain) Real Madrid
  - Group D: AJ Milano (Italy) 71–81 (Turkey) Efes Pilsen
    - CSKA and Efes Pilsen improve to 2–0 record

==== Chess ====
- World Chess Championship in Bonn, Germany:
  - Game 11, (India) Viswanathan Anand (W) vs. (Russia) Vladimir Kramnik (B), drawn. **Anand wins 6½–4½**
    - Viswanathan Anand successfully defends his world champion title.

==== Cricket ====
- New Zealand in Bangladesh:
  - 2nd Test in Dhaka, day 5:
    - New Zealand 262/6d & 79/1, Bangladesh 169/9d – Match drawn. **New Zealand win the 2-match series 1–0**
- Australia in India:
  - 3rd Test in New Delhi, day 1:
    - India 296/3 (89.0 ov)

==== Football (soccer) ====
- News: Former Argentine football legend Diego Maradona is appointed as coach of Argentina national football team.
- U-17 Women's World Cup in New Zealand
  - Group A: Denmark 1–1 Colombia
  - Group B: Costa Rica 0–5 Germany
  - Group B: North Korea 1–1 Ghana
- Women's Euro 2009 qualifying playoff, second leg:
  (aggregate score in parentheses; teams in **bold** advance to the final tournament)
  - **Italy** 2(3)–1(1) Czech Republic

=== October 28, 2008 (Tuesday) ===
==== Baseball ====
- Major League Baseball Postseason
  - 2008 World Series
    - Game Five, which was scheduled to resume on Tuesday evening with the score tied at 2–2 in the middle of the sixth inning, is postponed due to bad weather until Wednesday at 8:35 PM US EDT (0035 Thursday UTC)

==== Basketball ====
- NBA season Opening Night:
  - Boston Celtics 90, Cleveland Cavaliers 85
  - Chicago Bulls 108, Milwaukee Bucks 95
  - Los Angeles Lakers 96, Portland Trail Blazers 76

==== Cricket ====
- New Zealand in Bangladesh:
  - 2nd Test in Dhaka, day 4:
    - New Zealand 262/6d; Bangladesh 13/3 (10.4 ov). Bangladesh trail by 249 runs with 7 wickets remaining in the 1st innings

==== Football (soccer) ====
- U-17 Women's World Cup in New Zealand
  - Group A: New Zealand 0–1 Canada

=== October 27, 2008 (Monday) ===
==== American football ====
- National Football League Week Eight Monday Night Football:
  - Tennessee Titans 31, Indianapolis Colts 21
    - The Titans improve their league best record to 7–0.
- NCAA football:
  - Tyrone Willingham was fired at the University of Washington effective at the end of the season.

==== Baseball ====
- Major League Baseball Postseason:
  - 2008 World Series:
    - Game 5: Tampa Bay Rays at Philadelphia Phillies. **Phillies lead series, 3–1.**
      - The game was suspended with the score tied at 2–2 after 5½ innings due to rain, the first time that this has happened in World Series history.

==== Chess ====
- World Chess Championship in Bonn, Germany:
  - Game 10, (Russia) Vladimir Kramnik (W) def. (India) Viswanathan Anand (B). **Anand leads 6–4**
    - Kramnik manages his first win in the match, but still needs to win the last two games to force a tie-break.

==== Cricket ====
- New Zealand in Bangladesh:
  - 2nd Test in Dhaka, day 3: Rain prevented any play for the 3rd consecutive day. The match is destined for a certain draw.

==== Rugby league ====
- Rugby League World Cup in Australia:
  - Group C: Ireland 20–22 Tonga in Sydney

=== October 26, 2008 (Sunday) ===
==== Alpine Skiing ====
- Men's World Cup:
  - Giant slalom in Sölden, Austria:
    - (1) Daniel Albrecht (Switzerland) 2:15.78 ( 1:07.30 + 1:08.48) (2) Didier Cuche (Switzerland) 2:15.92 ( 1:07.56 + 1:08.36) (3) Ted Ligety (United States) 2:17.03 ( 1:07.57 + 1:09.46)

==== American football ====
- National Football League Week Eight:
  - Carolina Panthers 27, Arizona Cardinals 23
  - Dallas Cowboys 13, Tampa Bay Buccaneers 9
  - Philadelphia Eagles 27, Atlanta Falcons 14
  - Miami Dolphins 25, Buffalo Bills 16
  - New York Jets 28, Kansas City Chiefs 24
  - Baltimore Ravens 29, Oakland Raiders 10
  - New England Patriots 23, St. Louis Rams 16
  - New Orleans Saints 37, San Diego Chargers 32 at London, England
  - Washington Redskins 25, Detroit Lions 17
  - Houston Texans 35, Cincinnati Bengals 6
  - Cleveland Browns 23, Jacksonville Jaguars 17
  - New York Giants 21, Pittsburgh Steelers 14
  - Seattle Seahawks 34, San Francisco 49ers 13

Bye week: Chicago Bears, Denver Broncos, Green Bay Packers, Minnesota Vikings.

- NCAA BCS Top 25:
  - (19) Tulsa 49, Central Florida 19.

==== Auto racing ====
- Sprint Cup Series:
  - Pep Boys Auto 500 at Hampton, Georgia
    - (1) (Missouri) Carl Edwards (2) (California) Jimmie Johnson (3) (Virginia) Denny Hamlin
- World Touring Car Championship:
  - Round 11 at Okayama International Circuit, Japan
    - Race 1: (1) (Sweden) Rickard Rydell (2) (Germany) Jörg Müller (3) (United Kingdom) Andy Priaulx
    - Race 2: (1) (Netherlands) Tom Coronel (2) (Brazil) Augusto Farfus Jr. (3) (Spain) Sergio Hernández
- IRL:
  - Nikon Indy 300 in Surfers Paradise, Queensland, Australia:
    - (1) (Australia) Ryan Briscoe (2) (New Zealand) Scott Dixon (3) (United States) Ryan Hunter-Reay
    - Briscoe becomes the first Australian driver in the 18-year history of the race to win their home race.
- V8 Supercar:
  - The Coffee Club V8 Supercar Challenge in Surfers Paradise, Queensland, Australia
    - (1) (Australia) Jamie Whincup (2) (Australia) Garth Tander (3) (Australia) Mark Winterbottom
- Deutsche Tourenwagen Masters:
  - Round 11 at Hockenheimring, Germany:
    - (1) (Germany) Timo Scheider (2) (United Kingdom) Paul di Resta (3) (United Kingdom) Jamie Green
    - Final standing: (1) Scheider 75 points (2) di Resta 71 points (3) (Sweden) Mattias Ekstrom 56 points

==== Baseball ====
- Major League Baseball Postseason:
  - 2008 World Series:
    - Game 4: Philadelphia Phillies 10, Tampa Bay Rays 2. **Phillies lead series, 3–1.**
      - Led by two Ryan Howard home runs and another from pitcher Joe Blanton, the Phils take firm control of the series.

==== Chess ====
- World Chess Championship in Bonn, Germany:
  - Game 9, (India) Viswanathan Anand (W) vs. (Russia) Vladimir Kramnik (B), drawn. **Anand leads 6–3**
    - Kramnik now must win the three remaining games to force a tie-break series.

==== Cricket ====
- New Zealand in Bangladesh:
  - 2nd Test in Dhaka, day 2: Another day completely lost due to rain

==== Figure Skating ====
- Skate America at Everett, Washington:
  - Ladies: (1) Kim Yuna (South Korea) 193.45 (2) Yukari Nakano (Japan) 172.53 (3) Miki Ando (Japan) 168.42
  - Ice dance: (1) Isabelle Delobel / Olivier Schoenfelder (France) 187.64 (2) Tanith Belbin / Benjamin Agosto (United States) 186.53 (3) Sinead Kerr / John Kerr (United Kingdom) 180.20

==== Football (soccer) ====
- Premier League:
  - Chelsea's 86-match unbeaten home run, dating back to February 2004, comes to an end with a 1–0 defeat by Liverpool, the ninth-minute goal being scored by Xabi Alonso.

==== Golf ====
- PGA Tour:
  - Frys.com Open in Scottsdale, Arizona:
    - Winner: Cameron Beckman (United States) 69–66–64–63=262 (−18)
- European Tour:
  - Castelló Masters Costa Azahar in Castellón, Spain:
    - Sergio García (Spain) wins his first European Tour event since 2005, at a course where his father is the club professional. His 20-under-par total of 264 gives him a three-shot win over Peter Hedblom (Sweden) .
- LPGA Tour:
  - Grand China Air LPGA in Haikou, China
    - Helen Alfredsson (Sweden) erases a five-shot deficit entering the final round with a 7-under 65, giving her a three-shot win over Yani Tseng (Taiwan) .

==== Motorcycle racing ====
- Moto GP:
  - Valencian Grand Prix in Valencia, Spain:
    - (1) Casey Stoner (Australia) (2) Dani Pedrosa (Spain) (3) Valentino Rossi (Italy)
    - Final standing: (1) Rossi 373 points (2) Stoner 280 points (3) Pedrosa 249 points

==== Rugby league ====
- Rugby League World Cup in Australia:
  - Group A: Australia 30–6 New Zealand in Sydney
  - Group B: France 18–36 Scotland in Canberra

==== Tennis ====
- ATP Tour:
  - Davidoff Swiss Indoors in Basel, Switzerland:
    - Final: (Switzerland) **Roger Federer** def. (Argentina) David Nalbandian, 6–3, 6–4
      - Federer wins his native city tournament for the 3rd consecutive year.
  - Grand Prix de Tennis de Lyon in Lyon, France:
    - Final: (Sweden) **Robin Söderling** def. (France) Julien Benneteau, 6–3, 6–7(5), 6–1
  - St. Petersburg Open in Saint Petersburg, Russia:
    - Final: (United Kingdom) **Andy Murray** def. (Kazakhstan) Andrey Golubev, 6–1, 6–1
- WTA Tour:
  - Generali Ladies Linz in Linz, Austria:
    - Final: (Serbia) **Ana Ivanovic** def. (Russia) Vera Zvonareva, 6–2, 6–1
  - Fortis Championships Luxembourg in Luxembourg City, Luxembourg:
    - Final: (Russia) **Elena Dementieva** def. (Denmark) Caroline Wozniacki, 2–6, 6–4, 7–6(4)

=== October 25, 2008 (Saturday) ===
==== Alpine Skiing ====
- Women's World Cup:
  - Giant slalom in Sölden, Austria:
    - (1) Kathrin Zettel (Austria) 2min 22.99sec (1:09.98 + 1:13.01) (2) Tanja Poutiainen (Finland) 2:23.97 (1:09.83 + 1:14.14) (3) Andrea Fischbacher (Austria) 2:24.47 (1:10.71 + 1:13.76)

==== American college football ====
- NCAA BCS Top 10:
  - (1) Texas 28, (6) Oklahoma State 24
  - (2) Alabama 29, Tennessee 9
  - (3) Penn State 13, (9) Ohio State 6
    - The Nittany Lions win in Columbus for the first time since 1978.
  - (4) Oklahoma 58, Kansas State 35
  - (5) Southern California 17, Arizona 10
  - (7) Georgia 52, (13) LSU 38
  - (8) Texas Tech 63, (23) Kansas 21
  - (10) Florida 63, Kentucky 5
- Other games:
  - Louisville 24, (16) South Florida 20
  - Rutgers 54, (17) Pittsburgh 34
  - Virginia 24, (18) Georgia Tech 17
  - Indiana 21, (22) Northwestern 19
  - In a 34–7 win over SMU, Navy becomes the first major-college team to not attempt a pass since Ohio did so in a 1997 win over Akron.

==== Baseball ====
- Major League Baseball Postseason:
  - 2008 World Series:
    - Game 3: Philadelphia Phillies 5, Tampa Bay Rays 4. **Phillies lead series 2–1.**
      - Carlos Ruiz's 45-foot single in the bottom of the ninth scores Eric Bruntlett ending a game that was delayed 91 minutes due to rain.

==== Canadian university football ====
- Ontario University Athletics quarterfinals:
  (CIS Top Ten rank in parentheses)
  - Ottawa Gee-Gees 42, Guelph Gryphons 37
  - (8)Laurier Golden Hawks 29, McMaster Marauders 0

==== Cricket ====
- New Zealand in Bangladesh:
  - 2nd Test in Dhaka, day 1: Washed out
- Associates Tri-Series in Nairobi, Kenya:
  - Final: Zimbabwe v Kenya – Match abandoned without a ball bowled.

==== Figure Skating ====
- Skate America at Everett, Washington:
  - Men: (1) Takahiko Kozuka (Japan) 226.18 pts (2) Johnny Weir (United States) 225.20 (3) Evan Lysacek (United States) 223.21
  - Pairs: (1) Aliona Savchenko–Robin Szolkowy (Germany) 180.77 pts (2) Keauna McLaughlin–Rockne Brubaker (United States) 172.69 (3) Maria Mukhortova–Maxim Trankov (Russia) 167.67

==== Horse racing ====
- Winners at the 2008 Breeders' Cup World Championships Day Two at Santa Anita Park, Arcadia, California:
  - Marathon: Muhannak
  - Turf Sprint: Desert Code
  - Dirt Mile: Albertus Maximus
  - Mile: Goldikova
    - Goldikova's trainer Freddy Head becomes the first person to win Breeders' Cup races as both jockey and trainer. Head rode Miesque to victory in the Mile in both 1987 and 1988.
  - Juvenile: Midshipman
  - Juvenile Turf: Donativum
  - Sprint: Midnight Lute
  - Turf: Conduit
  - Classic: Raven's Pass
    - Curlin, who came in as the favorite, finished in fourth place.

==== Rugby league ====
- Rugby League World Cup in Australia:
  - Group A: England 32–22 Papua New Guinea in Townsville

==== Rugby union ====
- Air New Zealand Cup Final in Wellington:
  - Wellington 6–7 **Canterbury**
- Currie Cup Final in Durban:
  - **Sharks** 14–9 Vodacom Blue Bulls

==== Tennis ====
- News:
  - Federico Luzzi, who was in the midst of a 200-day suspension due to gambling on tennis matches, dies from leukemia at the age of 28.

=== October 24, 2008 (Friday) ===
==== American college football ====
- NCAA BCS Top 25:
  - (12) Boise State 33, San José State 16

==== Chess ====
- World Chess Championship in Bonn, Germany:
  - Game 8, (Russia) Vladimir Kramnik (W) vs. (India) Viswanathan Anand (B), drawn. **Anand leads 5½–2½**
    - After Kramnik fails again to win with the white pieces, Anand is only one win away from defending his title.

==== Horse Racing ====
- Winners in the 2008 Breeders' Cup World Championships Day One at Santa Anita Park, Arcadia, California
  - Filly & Mare Sprint: Ventura
  - Juvenile Fillies Turf: Maram
  - Juvenile Fillies: Stardom Bound
  - Filly & Mare Turf: Forever Together
  - Ladies' Classic: Zenyatta

=== October 23, 2008 (Thursday) ===
==== Baseball ====
- Major League Baseball Postseason:
  - 2008 World Series:
    - Game 2: Tampa Bay Rays 4, Philadelphia Phillies 2. **Series tied at 1–1.**
      - The Rays jump on Brett Myers for three early runs in the first two innings and win.

==== Basketball ====
- Euroleague, week 1:
  - Group A: Cibona Zagreb (Croatia) 81–79 (Israel) Maccabi Tel Aviv
  - Group A: Air Avellino (Italy) 69–83 (Greece) Olympiacos
  - Group B: Nancy (France) 54–82 (Spain) Regal Barcelona
  - Group C: ALBA Berlin (Germany) 68–63 (Italy) Lottomatica Roma
  - Group C: Joventut Badalona (Spain) 81–64 (Slovenia) Olimpija Ljubljana
  - Group D: Efes Pilsen (Turkey) 61–60 (Serbia) Partizan Belgrade
  - Group D: Real Madrid (Spain) 87–66 (Greece) Panionios
- American college basketball:
  - University of Arizona coach Lute Olson retires after 24 years on the job.

==== Chess ====
- World Chess Championship in Bonn, Germany:
  - Game 7, (India) Viswanathan Anand (W) vs. (Russia) Vladimir Kramnik (B), drawn. **Anand leads 5–2**

==== Cricket ====
- Associates Tri-Series in Nairobi, Kenya:
  - Kenya v Zimbabwe – Match abandoned without a ball bowled.
    - As a result of 3 wash-out matches in a row, Kenya and Zimbabwe advance to the final on superior net run rate, to be played on Saturday, weather permitting.

==== Football (soccer) ====
- UEFA Cup group stage, matchday 1:
  - Group A: Twente Enschede (Netherlands) 1–0 (Spain) Racing Santander
  - Group A: Schalke 04 (Germany) 3–1 (France) Paris Saint-Germain
  - Group B: Hertha Berlin (Germany) 1–1 (Portugal) Benfica
  - Group B: Galatasaray (Turkey) 1–0 (Greece) Olympiacos
  - Group C: Sevilla (Spain) 2–0 (Germany) Stuttgart
  - Group C: Partizan Belgrade (Serbia) 1–2 (Italy) Sampdoria
  - Group D: Udinese (Italy) 2–0 (England) Tottenham Hotspur
  - Group D: Dinamo Zagreb (Croatia) 3–2 (Netherlands) NEC Nijmegen
  - Group E: Heerenveen (Netherlands) 1–3 (Italy) Milan
  - Group E: Braga (Portugal) 3–0 (England) Portsmouth
  - Group F: Aston Villa (England) 2–1 (Netherlands) Ajax Amsterdam
  - Group F: MŠK Žilina (Slovakia) 1–2 (Germany) Hamburg
  - Group G: Copenhagen (Denmark) 1–3 (France) Saint-Étienne
  - Group G: Rosenborg (Norway) 0–0 (Belgium) Club Brugge
  - Group H: Nancy (France) 3–0 (Netherlands) Feyenoord
  - Group H: CSKA Moscow (Russia) 3–0 (Spain) Deportivo La Coruña

==== Golf ====
- A brain tumor removed from Seve Ballesteros is confirmed to be malignant. The retired Spanish great will undergo another operation on Friday to relieve pressure caused by swelling and bleeding; doctors in Madrid will also attempt to remove remaining fragments of the tumor. (AP)

==== Mixed martial arts ====
- The Florida Department of Business and Professional Regulation, which oversees the state Boxing Commission, concludes that ProElite, the parent company of the now-defunct EliteXC promotion, committed no wrongdoing surrounding the controversial bout between Kimbo Slice and Seth Petruzelli. (ESPN.com)

=== October 22, 2008 (Wednesday) ===
==== Baseball ====
- Major League Baseball Postseason:
  - 2008 World Series:
    - Game 1: Philadelphia Phillies 3, Tampa Bay Rays 2. **Phillies lead series 1–0.**
      - Thanks to Chase Utley's two-run homer and the strong seven-inning effort from team ace Cole Hamels, the Phillies steal the home field advantage won in the All-Star Game from the Rays.

==== Basketball ====
- Euroleague, week 1:
  - Group A: Unicaja Málaga (Spain) 84–79 (France) Le Mans
  - Group B: Panathinaikos (Greece) 78–51 (Lithuania) Žalgiris Kaunas
  - Group B: Montepaschi Siena (Italy) 80–71 (Poland) Asseco Prokom Sopot
  - Group D: CSKA Moscow (Russia) 90–64 (Italy) AJ Milano

==== Cricket ====
- Associates Tri-Series in Nairobi, Kenya:
  - Kenya v Ireland – Match abandoned without a ball bowled

==== Football (soccer) ====
- UEFA Champions League group stage, matchday 3:
  - Group A: Bordeaux (France) 1–0 (Romania) CFR Cluj
  - Group A: Chelsea (England) 1–0 (Italy) Roma
  - Group B: Internazionale (Italy) 1–0 (Cyprus) Anorthosis
  - Group B: Panathinaikos (Greece) 2–2 (Germany) Werder Bremen
  - Group C: Shakhtar Donetsk (Ukraine) 0–1 (Portugal) Sporting CP
  - Group C: Basel (Switzerland) 0–5 (Spain) Barcelona
  - Group D: Atlético Madrid (Spain) 1–1 (England) Liverpool
  - Group D: PSV Eindhoven (Netherlands) 2–0 (France) Marseille
- AFC Champions League semifinals, second leg:
  (Aggregate score in parentheses; teams in **bold** advance to the final)
  - Urawa Red Diamonds (Japan) 1(2)–3(4) (Japan) **Gamba Osaka**
  - Bunyodkor (Uzbekistan) 1(1)–0(3) (Australia) **Adelaide United**

==== Shooting ====
- World Running Target Championships in Plzeň, Czech Republic:
  - In the first ever 10 metre running target World Championship to be decided in a knockout format, (Sweden) Emil Martinsson wins the final 6–1, scoring seven consecutive tens.

=== October 21, 2008 (Tuesday) ===
==== American football ====
- NFL News:
  - ESPN reports that former Atlanta Falcons quarterback Michael Vick, currently serving a 23-month sentence in federal prison for his dog fighting activities, will plead guilty to Virginia state charges related to the same activities. Under terms of the plea, Vick will not serve any time in state prison, but will serve one year of state probation in addition to his three years of federal probation upon his release from prison.

==== Chess ====
- World Chess Championship in Bonn, Germany:
  - Game 6, (India) Viswanathan Anand (W) def. (Russia) Vladimir Kramnik (B). **Anand leads 4½–1½**

==== Cricket ====
- Australia in India:
  - 2nd Test in Mohali, day 5:
    - India 469 and 314/3d def. Australia 268 and 195 by 320 runs. **India lead 4-match series 1–0**
- New Zealand in Bangladesh:
  - 1st Test in Chittagong, day 5:
    - New Zealand 171 and 317/7 def. Bangladesh 245 and 242 by 3 wickets. **New Zealand lead 2-match series 1–0**
- Associates Tri-Series in Nairobi, Kenya:
  - Ireland v Zimbabwe – Match abandoned without a ball bowled

==== Football (soccer) ====
- UEFA Champions League group stage, matchday 3:
  - Group E: Villarreal (Spain) 6–3 (Denmark) Aalborg BK
    - Villareal score four goals in the last 23 minutes, including a hat-trick by Substitute Joseba Llorente
  - Group E: Manchester United (England) 3–0 (Scotland) Celtic
    - Dimitar Berbatov scores two goals for the second time, as United keeps a clean net for the third match in a row
  - Group F: Bayern (Germany) 3–0 (Italy) Fiorentina
  - Group F: Steaua (Romania) 3–5 (France) Lyon
    - Lyon comes back from 0 to 2 and 2–3 down with couple of goals by Karim Benzema and Fred
  - Group G: Fenerbahçe (Turkey) 2–5 (England) Arsenal
    - 9 goals for Arsenal in last two matches
  - Group G: Porto (Portugal) 0–1 (Ukraine) Dynamo Kyiv
  - Group H: Zenit St. Petersburg (Russia) 1–1 (Belarus) BATE Borisov
  - Group H: Juventus (Italy) 2–1 (Spain) Real Madrid
  - 36 goals are scored, the most in a single day in the Champions League history

==== Mixed Martial Arts ====
- Elite XC announces it will cease operations a mere ten days after the infamous Kimbo Slice–Seth Petruzelli bout on its Heat show. The Florida Athletic Commission is looking into allegations the fight was fixed. (Los Angeles Times)

=== October 20, 2008 (Monday) ===
==== American football ====
- National Football League Week Seven Monday Night Football:
  - New England Patriots 41, Denver Broncos 7
    - A costly win for the Pats as Rodney Harrison is lost for the season with a quadriceps injury.
- Other NFL news:
  - The San Francisco 49ers fire head coach Mike Nolan, making him the league's third head coach to be axed this season. Niners assistant and former Chicago Bears great Mike Singletary is named as Nolan's replacement.
  - According to Dallas Cowboys owner Jerry Jones, suspended Cowboys cornerback Adam Jones has entered an inpatient alcohol treatment center.

==== Basketball ====
- Euroleague opening match:
  - Group C: TAU Cerámica (Spain) 80–70 (Turkey) Fenerbahçe Ülker

==== Chess ====
- World Chess Championship in Bonn, Germany:
  - Game 5, (India) Viswanathan Anand (B) def. (Russia) Vladimir Kramnik (W). **Anand leads 3½–1½**

==== Cricket ====
- Australia in India:
  - 2nd Test in Mohali, day 4:
    - India 469 and 314/3dec.; Australia 268 and 141/5. Australia require another 375 runs with 5 wickets remaining.
- New Zealand in Bangladesh:
  - 1st Test in Chittagong, day 4:
    - Bangladesh 245 and 242; New Zealand 171 and 145/2. New Zealand require another 172 runs with 8 wickets remaining.

==== Shooting ====
- World Running Target Championships in Plzeň, Czech Republic:
  - On the first competition day, (Poland) Łukasz Czapla wins the gold medal shoot-off in men's 10 metre running target mixed to successfully defend the first of his three 2006 titles.

=== October 19, 2008 (Sunday) ===
==== American football ====
- National Football League Week Seven:
  - Baltimore Ravens 27, Miami Dolphins 13
    - Former Dolphins coach Cam Cameron, now the Ravens' offensive coordinator, gets a measure of revenge on the team that fired him.
  - St. Louis Rams 34, Dallas Cowboys 14
    - Without Tony Romo, the Cowboys get blown out.
  - Chicago Bears 48, Minnesota Vikings 41
    - In a rare offensive explosion in the NFC North, the Bears win.
  - Carolina Panthers 30, New Orleans Saints 7
    - The Saints lose Reggie Bush to a knee injury.
  - Pittsburgh Steelers 37, Cincinnati Bengals 10
    - Ben Roethlisberger improves to 11–0 in Ohio.
  - Buffalo Bills 23, San Diego Chargers 14
    - The Bills improve to their best record since 1995.
  - New York Giants 29, San Francisco 49ers 17
    - Brandon Jacobs scores twice as the Giants improve to 5–1.
  - Tennessee Titans 34, Kansas City Chiefs 10
    - LenDale White scores three rushing touchdowns as the Titans improve to 6–0.
  - Houston Texans 28, Detroit Lions 21
    - The Texans win their second straight game.
  - Washington Redskins 14, Cleveland Browns 11
    - Clinton Portis rushes for 175 yards in the Redskins' victory.
  - Green Bay Packers 34, Indianapolis Colts 14
    - Peyton Manning saw two interceptions returned for Packers touchdowns.
  - Oakland Raiders 16, New York Jets 13 (OT)
    - Sebastian Janikowski's 57-yard overtime field goal gives interim coach Tom Cable his first win.
  - Tampa Bay Buccaneers 20, Seattle Seahawks 10

Bye Week: Arizona Cardinals, Atlanta Falcons, Jacksonville Jaguars, Philadelphia Eagles.

==== Auto racing ====
- Formula One:
  - Chinese Grand Prix in Shanghai:
    - (1) (United Kingdom) Lewis Hamilton (2) (Brazil) Felipe Massa (3) (Finland) Kimi Räikkönen
    - Drivers' standing, with one race remaining: (1) (United Kingdom) Hamilton 94 (2) (Brazil) Massa 87 (3) (Poland) Kubica 75
    - Constructors' standing: (1) (Italy) Ferrari 156 (2) (United Kingdom) McLaren–Mercedes 145 (3) (Germany) BMW Sauber 135
- Sprint Cup Series:
  - TUMS QuikPak 500 at Ridgeway, Virginia
    - (1) (California) Jimmie Johnson (2) (North Carolina) Dale Earnhardt Jr. (3) (Missouri) Carl Edwards

==== Baseball ====
- Major League Baseball postseason:
  - American League Championship Series:
    - Game Seven: Tampa Bay Rays 3, Boston Red Sox 1. **Rays win series, 4–3.**
      - Pitcher and series MVP Matt Garza leads the Rays to victory, dethroning the defending World Series champions, as for the eighth year in a row, Major League Baseball will crown a different world champion, with the 2000 New York Yankees remaining the last team to repeat.

==== Cricket ====
- Australia in India:
  - 2nd Test in Mohali, day 3:
    - India 469 and 100/0; Australia 268. India lead by 301 runs with 10 wickets remaining
- New Zealand in Bangladesh:
  - 1st Test in Chittagong, day 3:
    - Bangladesh 245 and 184/8; New Zealand 171. Bangladesh lead by 258 runs with 2 wickets remaining
- Associates Tri-Series in Nairobi, Kenya:
  - Kenya 285/9 (50 ov) def. Zimbabwe 190 (38.1 ov) by 95 runs

==== Football (soccer) ====
- Futsal World Cup in Brazil:
  - Final: **Brazil** 2–2 Spain (AET)
    - Brazil win 4:3 in penalty shootout

==== Golf ====
- PGA Tour:
  - Justin Timberlake Shriners Hospitals for Children Open in Las Vegas, Nevada
    - (United States) Marc Turnesa becomes the 12th first-time winner on the PGA Tour this season, winning by one shot with a final total of 263 (−25).
- European Tour:
  - Portugal Masters in Vilamoura, Portugal:
    - Winner: (Spain) Álvaro Quirós 269 (19 under par)
- LPGA Tour:
  - Kapalua LPGA Classic in Lahaina, Hawaiʻi
    - (United States) Morgan Pressel birdies the final hole, giving her a one-shot win over (Norway) Suzann Pettersen.

==== Motorcycle racing ====
- Moto GP:
  - Malaysian Grand Prix in Sepang, Malaysia:
    - (1) (Italy) Valentino Rossi (2) (Spain) Dani Pedrosa (3) (Italy) Andrea Dovizioso
    - Season standing, with one race remaining: (1) (Italy) Rossi (champion) 357 (2) (Australia) Casey Stoner 255 (3) (Spain) Pedrosa 229

==== Tennis ====
- ATP Tour:
  - Madrid Masters in Madrid, Spain:
    - Final: (United Kingdom) **Andy Murray** def. (France) Gilles Simon, 6–4, 7–6(6)
- WTA Tour:
  - Zurich Open in Zürich, Switzerland:
    - Final: (United States) **Venus Williams** def. (Italy) Flavia Pennetta, 7–6(1), 6–2

=== October 18, 2008 (Saturday) ===
==== American college football ====
- NCAA AP Top 10:
  - (1) Texas 56, (11) Missouri 31
    - Colt McCoy runs for two touchdowns and goes 29-for-32 passing with 337 yards and two more TDs, and the Longhorns take a 28–0 lead before the Tigers even cross midfield.
  - (2) Alabama 24, Ole Miss 20
  - (3) Penn State 46, Michigan 17
  - (4) Oklahoma 45, (16) Kansas 31
  - (6) Southern California 69, Washington State 0
    - Mark Sanchez becomes the first Trojans quarterback to throw for five TDs in a half, and the Trojans score their biggest shutout win since 1931, while the Cougars suffer their worst shutout loss in history.
  - (7) Texas Tech 43, Texas A&M 25
  - (8) Oklahoma State 34, Baylor 6
  - (10) Georgia 24, (22) Vanderbilt 14
- Other games:
  - (12) Ohio State 45, (20) Michigan State 7
  - Maryland 26, (21) Wake Forest 0
  - Virginia 16, (18) North Carolina 13 (OT)
    - The Cavs win in overtime after being held to a field goal in the first 59 minutes.

==== Baseball ====
- Major League Baseball postseason:
  - American League Championship Series:
    - Game Six: Boston Red Sox 4, Tampa Bay Rays 2. **Series tied at 3–3.**
      - Jason Varitek picked a great time to get his first ALCS hit: his sixth-inning home run helped the Red Sox force Game Seven on Sunday.

==== Chess ====
- World Chess Championship in Bonn, Germany:
  - Game 4, (India) Viswanathan Anand (W) vs. (Russia) Vladimir Kramnik (B), drawn. **Anand leads 2½–1½**

==== Cricket ====
- Australia in India:
  - 2nd Test in Mohali, day 2:
    - India 469; Australia 102/4. Australia trail by 367 runs with 6 wickets remaining in the 1st innings.
- New Zealand in Bangladesh:
  - 1st Test in Chittagong, day 2:
    - Bangladesh 245; New Zealand 155/9. New Zealand trail by 90 runs with 1 wicket remaining in the 1st innings.
- Associates Tri-Series in Nairobi, Kenya:
  - Ireland 285/6 (47/47 ov) def. Kenya 199 (44/47 ov) by 86 runs.

==== Football (soccer) ====
- CAF Champions League semifinals, second leg:
  (first leg score in parentheses; teams in **bold** advance to the final)
  - **Al Ahly** (Egypt) 1(0)–0(0) (Nigeria) Enyimba
  - **Cotonsport Garoua** (Cameroon) 4(1)–0(0) (Zimbabwe) Dynamos
- Futsal World Cup in Brazil:
  - Bronze medal match: Russia 1–2 Italy

=== October 17, 2008 (Friday) ===
==== American college football ====
- NCAA AP Top 25:
  - (15) Boise State 27, Hawaiʻi 7

==== Chess ====
- World Chess Championship in Bonn, Germany:
  - Game 3, (India) Viswanathan Anand (B) def. (Russia) Vladimir Kramnik (W). **Anand leads 2–1**

==== Cricket ====
- Australia in India:
  - 2nd Test in Mohali, day 1:
    - India 311/5 (85.0 ov)
      - (India) Sachin Tendulkar becomes the highest run-scorer in Test cricket, surpassing (Cricket West Indies) Brian Lara's mark of 11,953 runs.
- New Zealand in Bangladesh:
  - 1st Test in Chittagong, day 1:
    - Bangladesh 183/4 (94.0 ov)
- Associates Tri-Series in Nairobi, Kenya:
  - Zimbabwe 303/8 (50 ov) def. Ireland 147 (46.1 ov) by 156 runs

=== October 16, 2008 (Thursday) ===
==== American college football ====
- NCAA AP Top 10:
  - Texas Christian (7–1) 32, (9) Brigham Young (6–1) 7
    - The Horned Frogs decisively end the longest winning streak in Division I FBS football at 16 games.

==== Baseball ====
- Major League Baseball postseason:
  - American League Championship Series:
    - Boston Red Sox 8, Tampa Bay Rays 7. **Rays lead series 3–2**
      - The Red Sox make the biggest postseason comeback in 69 years from 7 to 0 down after six and a half innings. David Ortiz' three-run homer in the seventh, J. D. Drew's two-run blast followed by Coco Crisp's single in the eighth, and then Drew's walk-off single after Evan Longoria's fielding error in the ninth inning completes the comeback.

==== Basketball ====
- Winner Cup final in Malcha Arena, Jerusalem:
  - Hapoel Jerusalem B.C. 84, Ironi Nahariya 69.

==== Football (soccer) ====
- Futsal World Cup in Brazil:
  - Semifinal: **Brazil** 4–2 Russia
  - Semifinal: **Spain** 3–2 Italy (AET)
    - Spain scores a controversial winning goal in the last second of extra time, a bizarre own goal by Italian player Adriano Foglia, who put into his own net a ball rebounded off the crossbar. The TV clock apparently showed the time has run out when the ball crossed the line, and it took some 20 minutes of consultation by the officials until the goal was confirmed.

==== Ice hockey ====
- National Hockey League:
  - The Chicago Blackhawks fire head coach Denis Savard and replace him with Joel Quenneville.

=== October 15, 2008 (Wednesday) ===
==== Baseball ====
- Major League Baseball postseason:
  - National League Championship Series:
    - Philadelphia Phillies 5, Los Angeles Dodgers 1. **Phillies win series 4–1**
      - The Phillies win their first pennant since 1993 to advance to the World Series. Cole Hamels is named NLCS MVP.

==== Chess ====
- World Chess Championship in Bonn, Germany:
  - Game 2, (India) Viswanathan Anand (W) vs. (Russia) Vladimir Kramnik (B), drawn. **Series level 1–1**

==== Football (soccer) ====
- 2010 FIFA World Cup qualification (UEFA), matchday 4:
  - Group 1: Portugal 0–0 Albania
  - Group 1: Malta 0–1 Hungary
    - Hungary gets level with idle Denmark at the top on 7 points.
  - Group 2: Latvia 1–1 Israel
  - Group 2: Luxembourg 0–0 Moldova
  - Group 2: Greece 1–2 Switzerland
    - Greece suffer its first defeat, but stay on top with 9 points, one ahead of Israel.
  - Group 3: Czech Republic 1–0 Slovenia
  - Group 3: Northern Ireland 4–0 San Marino
  - Group 3: Slovakia 2–1 Poland
    - Slovakia goes to the top of the group on 9 points, with Poland and Slovenia 2 points behind.
  - Group 4: Russia 3–0 Finland
  - Group 4: Germany 1–0 Wales
    - Germany lead the group on 10 points, ahead of Russia and Wales on 6 points.
  - Group 5: Bosnia and Herzegovina 4–1 Armenia
  - Group 5: Estonia 0–0 Turkey
  - Group 5: Belgium 1–2 Spain
    - Spain extend its unbeaten streak to 27 matches, and scores fourth win in a row thanks to David Villa's goal 2 minutes from time.
  - Group 6: Croatia 4–0 Andorra
  - Group 6: Belarus 1–3 England
    - Two goals by Wayne Rooney lead England to its fourth win in succession.
  - Group 7: Lithuania 1–0 Faroe Islands
  - Group 7: Austria 1–3 Serbia
    - Serbia and Lithuania lead the group on 9 points.
  - Group 8: Georgia 0–0 Bulgaria
  - Group 8: Republic of Ireland 1–0 Cyprus
  - Group 8: Italy 2–1 Montenegro
    - Italy lead the group on 10 points, with Ireland 3 points behind but with a game in hand.
  - Group 9: Iceland 1–0 North Macedonia
  - Group 9: Norway 0–1 Netherlands
    - Netherlands scores third win in as many matches, and lead by 5 points over Scotland and Iceland.
- 2010 FIFA World Cup qualification (CONMEBOL), matchday 10
  - Paraguay 1–0 Peru
  - Chile 1–0 Argentina
  - Brazil 0–0 Colombia
  - Venezuela 3–1 Ecuador
    - After 10 of 18 matches, Paraguay lead the standing on 23 points, followed by Brazil on 17, Argentina and Chile 16, Uruguay 13, Ecuador 12, Colombia 11.
- 2010 FIFA World Cup qualification (CONCACAF), third round, matchday 5:
  (teams in **bold** advance to the fourth round)
  - Group 1: Trinidad and Tobago 2–1 **United States**
    - A penalty from Dwight Yorke gives the Soca Warriors the win over an already-advanced and experimental US side.
  - Group 1: Cuba 2–1 Guatemala
    - An 87th-minute goal from Allianni Urguelles gives already-eliminated Cuba their first win of the third round and deals Guatemala's qualification hopes a huge blow. Guatemala must win their last match at USA and hope Trinidad & Tobago lose to Cuba, otherwise Trinidad will advance.
  - Group 2: Jamaica 1–0 Honduras
    - Jamaica's win keep their slim hope of qualifying alive.
  - Group 2: Canada 2–2 Mexico
    - Mexico fails to book their qualification, but remain the front runner with 10 points, one ahead of Honduras and three ahead of Jamaica. On the last matchday, Honduras meet Mexico while Jamaica play Canada.
  - Group 3: **El Salvador** 3–0 Suriname
    - El Salvador join Costa Rica, that secured its qualification earlier.
  - Group 3: **Costa Rica** 2–0 Haiti
    - The Ticos score fifth win in as many matches.
- 2010 FIFA World Cup qualification (AFC), fourth round, matchday 3:
  - Group A: Japan 1–1 Uzbekistan
  - Group A: Australia 4–0 Qatar
    - Australia is the only team with maximum points (6 points from 2 matches)
  - Group B: Iran 2–1 North Korea
  - Group B: South Korea 4–1 United Arab Emirates
    - Korea lead the group on 4 points from 2 matches, ahead of Iran, Saudi Arabia and Korea DPR on goals difference
- 2009 European Under-21 Championship qualification playoffs, second leg:
  (first leg score in parentheses; teams in **bold** advance to the final tournament)
  - **Serbia** 1(1)–0(0) Denmark
  - France 0(1)–1(1) **Germany**
  - Israel 1(0)–3(0) **Italy**

=== October 14, 2008 (Tuesday) ===
==== American football ====
- NFL commissioner Roger Goodell suspends Dallas Cowboys defensive back Adam "Pacman" Jones for a minimum of four games for violating the league's conduct policy after an alcohol-related incident a week earlier in a hotel in Dallas.

==== Baseball ====
- Major League Baseball postseason:
  - American League Championship Series:
    - Tampa Bay Rays 13, Boston Red Sox 4. **Rays lead series 3–1.**

==== Chess ====
- World Chess Championship in Bonn, Germany:
  - Game 1, (Russia) Vladimir Kramnik (W) vs. (India) Viswanathan Anand (B), drawn. **Series level ½–½**

==== Cricket ====
- New Zealand in Bangladesh:
  - 3rd ODI in Chittagong: New Zealand 249/7 (50 ov) def. Bangladesh 170/8 (50 ov) by 79 runs. **New Zealand win series 2–1**
- ICC Intercontinental Cup in Nairobi, day 4:
  - Ireland 578/4 declared def. Kenya 186 and 327 (follow-on) by innings and 65 runs.
    - Ireland advance to the final against Namibia, to be played from October 30 in Port Elizabeth, South Africa

==== Football (soccer) ====
- 2010 FIFA World Cup qualification (CONMEBOL), matchday 10:
  - Bolivia 2–2 Uruguay
- Futsal World Cup in Brazil:
  (teams in **bold** advance to the semifinals)
  - Group E: **Brazil** 5–3 Ukraine
  - Group E: Iran 5–5 **Italy**
  - Group F: Argentina 2–2 **Russia**
  - Group F: Paraguay 1–4 **Spain**
- 2009 European Under-21 Championship qualification playoffs, second leg:
  (first leg score in parentheses; teams in **bold** advance to the final tournament)
  - **Belarus** 2(0)–0(1) Turkey
  - **Finland** 2(1)–1(2) Austria
    - Finland win 4:2 in penalty shootout
  - **England** 2(3)–2(2) Wales
  - **Spain** 3(1)–1(2) Switzerland (AET)
- Friendly match:
  - France 3–1 Tunisia

=== October 13, 2008 (Monday) ===
==== American football ====
- National Football League Week Six Monday Night Football:
  - Cleveland Browns 35, New York Giants 14.
- NCAA Football:
  - Tommy Bowden is fired as head coach at Clemson. Dabo Swinney was named interim coach for the remainder of the season.

==== Baseball ====
- Major League Baseball postseason:
  - American League Championship Series:
    - Tampa Bay Rays 9, Boston Red Sox 1. **Rays lead series 2–1.**
  - National League Championship Series:
    - Philadelphia Phillies 7, Los Angeles Dodgers 5. **Phillies lead series 3–1.**
      - An eighth-inning rally by the Phillies, with two two-run home runs by Shane Victorino and pinch-hitter Matt Stairs puts the Phillies one win from the World Series.

==== Cricket ====
- Australia in India:
  - 1st Test in Bangalore, day 5:
    Australia 430 & 228/6 declared, India 360 & 177/4 – Match drawn. **4-match series level 0–0**.
    - Australia declares their second innings 5 overs after start of play and set India a target of 299 runs to win. Any chance of either team to win is gone when bad light delays play shortly after tea, with India still 151 runs off their target and 6 wickets remaining.
      Man of the match: Zaheer Khan (6 wickets).
- Quadrangular Twenty20 Series in King City, Ontario, Canada:
  - Final: Sri Lanka 136/5 (19/20 ov) def. Pakistan 132/7 (20/20 ov) by 5 wickets with 6 balls remaining.
  - 3rd place playoff: Zimbabwe 184/5 (20/20 ov) def. Canada 75 (19.2/20 ov) by 109 runs.
- ICC Intercontinental Cup in Nairobi, day 3 of 4:
  - Ireland 578/4d; Kenya 186 and 146/2 (f/o). Kenya trail by 246 runs with 8 wickets remaining.

==== Horse Racing ====
- Big Brown was retired by his owners, and will not run in the Breeders' Cup Classic on October 25 at Santa Anita Park.

=== October 12, 2008 (Sunday) ===
==== American football ====
- National Football League Week Six:
  - Indianapolis Colts 31, Baltimore Ravens 3
    - The Colts finally get a home win in Lucas Oil Stadium in five tries as Peyton Manning shreds the Ravens' top-ranked defense with three touchdown passes.
  - Tampa Bay Buccaneers 27, Carolina Panthers 3
    - The Bucs are now tied for the top of the NFC South with the Falcons and Panthers.
  - Atlanta Falcons 22, Chicago Bears 20
    - Jason Elam's 46-yard last second field goal gives the Falcons the win.
  - New York Jets 26, Cincinnati Bengals 14
    - The Jets keep the Bengals winless, behind three Thomas Jones touchdowns.
  - Minnesota Vikings 12, Detroit Lions 10
    - Ryan Longwell's 27-yard field goal with 11 seconds left keeps the toothless Lions winless.
  - Houston Texans 29, Miami Dolphins 23
    - Matt Schaub runs for a three-yard touchdown on fourth-and-goal with three seconds left giving the Texans their first win of the season.
  - New Orleans Saints 34, Oakland Raiders 3
    - Saints quarterback Drew Brees threw for three touchdowns and running back Reggie Bush ties Anquan Boldin's NFL record as the fastest player to reach 200 career receptions to keep the Raiders winless.
  - St. Louis Rams 19, Washington Redskins 17
    - The Rams get their first win thanks to Josh Brown's 49-yard walk-off field goal.
  - Jacksonville Jaguars 24, Denver Broncos 17
    - Maurice Jones-Drew runs for two touchdowns in the Jaguars' win.
  - Arizona Cardinals 30, Dallas Cowboys 24 (OT)
    - The Cardinals started the game with a 93-yard kickoff return by J.J. Arrington for a touchdown and end it with a blocked punt recovery for three yards by Monty Beisel in overtime for the win, the first game to end on such a play.
  - Green Bay Packers 27, Seattle Seahawks 17
    - Aaron Rodgers throws for two touchdowns and runs for a third in the Pack's win.
  - Philadelphia Eagles 40, San Francisco 49ers 26
    - The Eagles come back in the fourth quarter with 23 points to get the win.
  - San Diego Chargers 30, New England Patriots 10
    - After three straight losses against the Patriots, the Chargers win behind Philip Rivers' three touchdowns.

Bye week: Buffalo Bills, Kansas City Chiefs, Pittsburgh Steelers, Tennessee Titans.

==== Auto racing ====
- Formula One:
  - Japanese Grand Prix in Oyama, Japan:
    - (1) Fernando Alonso (Spain) (2) Robert Kubica (Poland) (3) Kimi Räikkönen (Finland)
      With two races remaining in the season, Lewis Hamilton leads by 5 points over Felipe Massa, and by 12 points over Kubica. In the constructors standing, Ferrari lead by 7 points over McLaren–Mercedes, with BMW Sauber 7 points further back.
- V8 Supercar:
  - Bathurst 1000 in Bathurst, New South Wales, Australia:
    - (1) Craig Lowndes (Australia) & Jamie Whincup (Australia) (2) Jason Richards (New Zealand) & Greg Murphy (New Zealand) (3) James Courtney (Australia) & David Besnard (Australia)
- WRC:
  - Tour de Corse in Corsica, France:
    - (1) Sébastien Loeb (France) (2) Mikko Hirvonen (Finland) (3) François Duval (Belgium)

==== Baseball ====
- Major League Baseball postseason:
  - National League Championship Series:
    - Los Angeles Dodgers 7, Philadelphia Phillies 2. **Phillies lead series 2–1.**
      - Save for a benches-clearing dustup (with no punches thrown) in the top of the third, the Dodgers never look back after lighting up Jamie Moyer for five first-inning runs.

==== Cricket ====
- Quadrangular Twenty20 Series in King City, Ontario, Canada:
  (teams in **bold** advance to the final)
  - **Pakistan** 110/3 (19/20 ov) def. Zimbabwe 107/8 (20/20 ov) by 7 wickets (with 6 balls remaining)
  - **Sri Lanka** 153/7 (20/20 ov) def. Canada 138 (20.0/20 ov) by 15 runs

==== Football (soccer) ====
- 2010 FIFA World Cup qualification (CONMEBOL), matchday 9:
  - Venezuela 0–4 Brazil
  - Ecuador 1–0 Chile
  - After these scores, which complete the first half of the qualifying campaign in South America, Paraguay is in pole position on 20 points, followed by Brazil and Argentina on 16 points each, Chile on 13 points, Uruguay and Ecuador on 12 points.
- 2010 FIFA World Cup qualification (CAF) second round, matchday 6:
  (teams in **bold** advance to the third round)
  - Group 2: **Guinea** 3–2 **Kenya**
  - Group 3: Angola 3–1 Niger
    - Angola is the first team that participated in the last World Cup to be eliminated.
  - Group 3: Uganda 2–1 **Benin**
  - Group 9: Burundi 1–3 **Burkina Faso**
  - Group 12: **Egypt** 4–0 Djibouti
  - **Mozambique** also advance to the third round
- Futsal World Cup in Brazil::
  (teams in **bold** advance to the semifinals)
  - Group E: Italy 0–3 **Brazil**
  - Group E: Ukraine 4–5 Iran
  - Group F: **Spain** 2–1 Argentina
  - Group F: Russia 5–4 Paraguay
- Other news:
  - Prosecutors in the German state of Bavaria state that they do not have sufficient evidence to launch an investigation of match fixing allegations surrounding the 2007–08 UEFA Cup semifinal between eventual champion Zenit St. Petersburg and Bayern Munich. (ESPNsoccernet.com)

==== Golf ====
- Champions Tour:
  - Senior Players Championship in Timonium, Maryland
    - D. A. Weibring (United States) comes back from a four-shot deficit with 14 holes to play and wins his first major.
- PGA Tour:
  - Valero Texas Open in San Antonio, Texas
    - Zach Johnson (United States) shoots 62–64 in the final two rounds, ending with 261 (19 under par) and a two-shot win.
- European Tour:
  - Madrid Masters in Madrid, Spain:
    - Winner: (South Africa) Charl Schwartzel 265 (19 under par)
- LPGA Tour:
  - Longs Drugs Challenge in Blackhawk, California
    - In-Kyung Kim (South Korea) wins for the first time on the tour, scoring a three-shot win over Angela Stanford (United States) .
- News:
  - Legendary golfer Seve Ballesteros confirms reports that he has come down with a brain tumor.

==== Tennis ====
- ATP Tour:
  - Kremlin Cup in Moscow, Russia:
    Final: **Igor Kunitsyn** def. Marat Safin, 7–6(6), 6–7(4), 6–3
  - Stockholm Open in Stockholm, Sweden:
    Final: (Argentina) **David Nalbandian** def. Robin Söderling, 6–2, 5–7, 6–3
  - Bank Austria-TennisTrophy in Vienna, Austria:
    Final: (Germany) **Philipp Petzschner** def. (France) Gaël Monfils, 6–4, 6–4
- WTA Tour:
  - Kremlin Cup in Moscow, Russia:
    Final: (Serbia) **Jelena Janković** def. Vera Zvonareva, 6–2, 6–4
    - Janković wins her third title in as many weeks, becoming the first player in three years to achieve such hat-trick on the WTA Tour.

=== October 11, 2008 (Saturday) ===
==== American college football ====
- NCAA AP Top 10:
  - Red River Rivalry at Dallas: (5) Texas 45, (1) Oklahoma 35
    - In the highest combined scoring game (80 points) in the Rivalry, the Longhorns get fifteen unanswered points in the final eight minutes to knock off the top-ranked Sooners, and leap to the top of the new AP survey, bypassing an idle Alabama team along the way.
  - (17) Oklahoma State 28, (3) Missouri 23
  - (11) Florida 51, (4) LSU 21
  - (6) Penn State 48, Wisconsin 7
    - The Badgers lose for the second straight week in Madison, and this time, it's a blowout to Joe Paterno's Nittany Lions.
  - (7) Texas Tech 37, Nebraska 31 (OT)
  - (8) Southern California 28, Arizona State 0
  - (9) Brigham Young 21, New Mexico 3
  - (10) Georgia 26, Tennessee 14
- In other games:
  - Mississippi State 17, (13) Vanderbilt 13
  - (14) Utah 40, Wyoming 7
  - (16) Kansas 30, Colorado 14
  - Arkansas 25, (20) Auburn 22
  - Toledo 13, Michigan 10
    - For the first time in 25 tries, a MAC team beats the Wolverines in "The Big House".

==== Auto racing ====
- Sprint Cup Series:
  - Bank of America 500 at Concord, North Carolina:
    (1) Jeff Burton (Virginia) (2) Kasey Kahne (Washington (state)) (3) Kurt Busch (Nevada)

==== Baseball ====
- Major League Baseball postseason:
  - American League Championship Series:
    - Tampa Bay Rays 9, Boston Red Sox 8 (11 innings). **Series tied 1–1.**

==== Cricket ====
- New Zealand in Bangladesh:
  - 2nd ODI in Dhaka: New Zealand 212/9 (50 ov) def Bangladesh 137 (42.4 ov) by 75 runs. **3-match series level 1–1**
- Quadrangular Twenty20 Series in King City, Ontario, Canada:
  - Canada 135/7 (20/20 ov) v Zimbabwe 135/9 (20/20 ov) – Match tied; Zimbabwe win bowl-out 3–1
  - Pakistan 141/7 (19.5/20 ov) def Sri Lanka 137/9 (20/20 ov) by 3 wickets (with 1 ball remaining)
- World Cricket League Division Four in Dar es Salaam, Tanzania:
  - Final: Afghanistan 179 (49.4 ov) def Hong Kong 122 (45 ov) by 57 runs.
    **Afghanistan and Hong Kong win promotion to division three.**
  - 3rd place play off: Italy 203/9 (50 ov) def Tanzania 133 (41.3 ov) by 70 runs.
  - Jersey and Fiji relegate to division five.

==== Football (soccer) ====
- 2010 FIFA World Cup qualification (UEFA), matchday 3:
  - Group 1: Hungary 2–0 Albania
  - Group 1: Sweden 0–0 Portugal
  - Group 1: Denmark 3–0 Malta
  - Group 2: Luxembourg 1–3 Israel
  - Group 2: Switzerland 2–1 Latvia
  - Group 2: Greece 3–0 Moldova
  - Group 3: Poland 2–1 Czech Republic
  - Group 3: San Marino 1–3 Slovakia
  - Group 3: Slovenia 2–0 Northern Ireland
  - Group 4: Finland 1–0 Azerbaijan
  - Group 4: Wales 2–0 Liechtenstein
  - Group 4: Germany 2–1 Russia
  - Group 5: Belgium 2–0 Armenia
  - Group 5: Turkey 2–1 Bosnia and Herzegovina
  - Group 5: Estonia 0–3 Spain
  - Group 6: England 5–1 Kazakhstan
  - Group 6: Ukraine 0–0 Croatia
  - Group 7: Serbia 3–0 Lithuania
  - Group 7: Faroe Islands 1–1 Austria
  - Group 7: Romania 2–2 France
  - Group 8: Georgia 1–1 Cyprus
  - Group 8: Bulgaria 0–0 Italy
  - Group 9: Scotland 0–0 Norway
  - Group 9: Netherlands 2–0 Iceland
  - After 3 matches for most teams, Greece, Spain, England and Netherlands (the latter played 2 matches) remain the only teams in Europe with wins-only record.
- 2010 FIFA World Cup qualification (CONMEBOL), matchday 9:
  - Bolivia 3–0 Peru
  - Argentina 2–1 Uruguay
  - Colombia 0–1 Paraguay
    - Paraguay stays 4 points ahead of Argentina at the top of the standing.
- 2010 FIFA World Cup qualification (CAF) second round, matchday 6:
  (Teams in **bold** advance to the third round)
  - Group 1: Tanzania 3–1 Cape Verde
  - Group 1: **Cameroon** 5–0 Mauritius
  - Group 2: Namibia 4–2 Zimbabwe
  - Group 4: Equatorial Guinea 0–1 South Africa
    - South Africa, that qualified as the host of 2010 FIFA World Cup, is eliminated from 2010 African Cup of Nations
  - Group 4: **Nigeria** 4–1 Sierra Leone
  - Group 5: **Gabon** 1–0 Libya
  - Group 5: **Ghana** 3–0 Lesotho
  - Group 6: Liberia 0–0 **Algeria**
  - Group 6: Senegal 1–1 Gambia
    - Senegal, quarterfinalist in 2002 FIFA World Cup, is eliminated
  - Group 7: **Ivory Coast** 3–0 Madagascar
  - Group 7: Botswana 0–1 Mozambique
  - Group 8: **Morocco** 4–1 Mauritania
  - Group 8: **Rwanda** – bye
  - Group 9: **Tunisia** 5–0 Seychelles
  - Group 10: **Sudan** 2–0 Congo
  - Group 10: **Mali** 2–1 Chad
  - Group 11: **Togo** 6–0 Swaziland
  - Group 11: **Zambia** – bye
  - Group 12: **Malawi** 2–1 DR Congo
  - **Benin, Kenya, Burkina Faso and Egypt** also advance to third round
- 2010 FIFA World Cup qualification (CONCACAF) third round, matchday 4:
  (Teams in **bold** advance to the fourth round)
  - Group 1: **United States** 6–1 Cuba
  - Group 1: Guatemala 0–0 Trinidad and Tobago
  - Group 2: Jamaica 1–0 Mexico
  - Group 2: Honduras 3–1 Canada
  - Group 3: Suriname 1–4 **Costa Rica**
  - Group 3: Haiti 0–0 El Salvador
- Futsal World Cup in Brazil:
  - Group E: Brazil 1–0 Iran
  - Group E: Ukraine 0–4 Italy
  - Group F: Paraguay 3–3 Argentina
  - Group F: Spain 5–2 Russia

=== October 10, 2008 (Friday) ===
==== Baseball ====
- Major League Baseball postseason:
  - American League Championship Series:
    - Boston Red Sox 2, Tampa Bay Rays 0. **Red Sox lead series 1–0.**
      - Dice-K gets the win in the opening game of the series.
  - National League Championship Series:
    - Philadelphia Phillies 8, Los Angeles Dodgers 5. **Phillies lead series 2–0.**
      - Thanks to a pair of bat-arounds in the second and third innings as well as the arm and bat of Brett Myers, the Phils head to Los Angeles with a two-game advantage.

==== Cricket ====
- Quadrangular Twenty20 Series in King City, Ontario, Canada:
  - Sri Lanka 107/5 (16/17 ov) def Zimbabwe 106/8 (17/17 ov) by 5 wickets (with 6 balls remaining)
  - Pakistan 137/7 (20/20 ov) def Canada 102/9 (20/20 ov) by 35 runs

=== October 9, 2008 (Thursday) ===
==== American college football ====
- NCAA AP Top 25:
  - (21) Wake Forest 12, Clemson 7

==== Baseball ====
- Major League Baseball postseason:
  - National League Championship Series:
    - Philadelphia Phillies 3, Los Angeles Dodgers 2. **Phillies lead series 1–0.**
      - Cole Hamels pitches seven strong innings and the Phils capitalize on a sixth-inning Rafael Furcal error with homers from Chase Utley (two-run) and Pat Burrell (solo) to win Game One.

==== Cricket ====
- New Zealand in Bangladesh:
  - 1st ODI in Dhaka:
    Bangladesh 202/3 (45.3 ov) beat New Zealand 201/9 (50 ov) by 7 wickets.
    **Bangladesh lead 3-matches series 1–0**

==== Ice hockey ====
- NHL Season Openers:
  - Toronto Maple Leafs 3, Detroit Red Wings 2
  - Boston Bruins 5, Colorado Avalanche 4
  - San Jose Sharks 4, Anaheim Ducks 1
  - Vancouver Canucks 6, Calgary Flames 0

==== Football (soccer) ====
- Futsal World Cup in Brazil:
  (teams in **bold** advance to the 2nd round)
  - Group C: **Argentina** 2–1 Guatemala
  - Group C: **Ukraine** 4–2 China
  - Group D: **Spain** 3–0 Uruguay
  - Group D: Czech Republic 2–3 **Iran**

=== October 8, 2008 (Wednesday) ===
==== Football (soccer) ====
- Futsal World Cup in Brazil:
  (teams in **bold** advance to the 2nd round)
  - Group A: **Brazil** 9–0 Cuba
  - Group A: **Russia** 9–1 Japan
  - Group B: **Italy** 2–4 **Paraguay**
  - Group B: Portugal 3–2 Thailand
- AFC Champions League semifinals, first leg:
  - Gamba Osaka (Japan) 1–1 (Japan) Urawa Red Diamonds
  - Adelaide United (Australia) 3–0 (Uzbekistan) Bunyodkor

=== October 6, 2008 (Monday) ===
==== American football ====
- National Football League Week Five Monday Night Football:
  - Minnesota Vikings 30, New Orleans Saints 27
    - Ryan Longwell's 30-yard field goal with 13 seconds left gives the Vikings the win on a wild Monday night. Reggie Bush tied an NFL record with two punt returns for touchdowns.

==== Baseball ====
- Major League Baseball postseason:
  - American League Division Series:
    - Tampa Bay Rays 6, Chicago White Sox 2. **Rays win series, 3–1.**
      - B.J. Upton hit two home runs and the Rays continue their dream season beating the White Sox to advance to the ALCS.
    - Boston Red Sox 3, Los Angeles Angels 2. **Red Sox win series 3–1.**
      - Jed Lowrie singles home Jason Bay with two outs in the bottom of the ninth to send the Old Town Team back to the ALCS and a date with the Rays.

=== October 5, 2008 (Sunday) ===
==== American football ====
- National Football League Week Five:
  - Atlanta Falcons 27, Green Bay Packers 24
    - Matt Ryan outshines Aaron Rodgers in a battle of young quarterbacks.
  - Chicago Bears 34, Detroit Lions 7
    - Kyle Orton has a career day as the Bears defeat the Lions.
  - Indianapolis Colts 31, Houston Texans 27
    - Two Sage Rosenfels fumbles spark the Colts' 21-point comeback in the game's final 4 minutes.
  - Carolina Panthers 34, Kansas City Chiefs 0
    - DeAngelo Williams rushes for 123 yards and two touchdowns and catches a third as the Panthers record their biggest shutout win in team history.
  - Miami Dolphins 17, San Diego Chargers 10
    - The Dolphins exceed their entire 2007 season win total.
  - New York Giants 44, Seattle Seahawks 6
    - Eli Manning throws for two touchdowns and Brandon Jacobs rushes for two more as the Giants rout the Seahawks.
  - Tennessee Titans 13, Baltimore Ravens 10
    - The Titans go to 5–0 for the first time in franchise history.
  - Washington Redskins 23, Philadelphia Eagles 17
    - Antwaan Randle El's touchdown pass to Chris Cooley and Clinton Portis' 145 yards lead the way in comeback victory.
  - Denver Broncos 16, Tampa Bay Buccaneers 13
    - Matt Prater's three field goals lift the Broncos to victory.
  - Arizona Cardinals 41, Buffalo Bills 17
    - The Bills lose quarterback Trent Edwards to a concussion as the Cardinals hand Buffalo its first loss of the season.
  - Dallas Cowboys 31, Cincinnati Bengals 22
    - The Cowboys lead by 17, before the Bengals make it a game.
  - New England Patriots 30, San Francisco 49ers 21
    - Randy Moss catches a 66-yard touchdown pass from Matt Cassel as Steve Young's #8 was retired.
  - Pittsburgh Steelers 26, Jacksonville Jaguars 21
    - The Steelers end a four-game losing streak to the Jags.

Bye Week: Cleveland Browns, New York Jets, Oakland Raiders, St. Louis Rams.

==== Auto racing ====
- Sprint Cup:
  - AMP Energy 500 in Talladega, Alabama
    - (1) Tony Stewart (Indiana) (2) Paul Menard (Wisconsin) (3) David Ragan (Georgia (U.S. state))
      - Regan Smith takes the checkered flag in first place, but is dropped to 18th (the last position on the lead lap) for passing Stewart below the yellow line at the inside of the track in the final turn. This race set new NASCAR records for numbers of different leaders and lead changes.
- WRC:
  - Rally Catalunya in Salou, Spain:
    (1) (France) Sébastien Loeb (2) Dani Sordo (3) (Finland) Mikko Hirvonen

==== Baseball ====
- Major League Baseball postseason:
  - American League Division Series:
    - Chicago White Sox 5, Tampa Bay Rays 3. **Rays lead series 2–1.**
    - Los Angeles Angels 5, Boston Red Sox 4 (12 innings). **Red Sox lead series 2–1.**
  - National League Division Series:
    - Philadelphia Phillies 6, Milwaukee Brewers 2. **Phillies win series 3–1.**
      - Home runs by Jimmy Rollins, Pat Burrell (twice) and Jayson Werth put the Phillies into the NLCS against Los Angeles Dodgers.

==== Basketball ====
- WNBA Finals:
  - Detroit Shock 76, San Antonio Silver Stars 60. **Shock wins 2008 WNBA Championship, 3–0.**

==== Football (soccer) ====
- CAF Champions League semifinals, first leg:
  - Enyimba (Nigeria) 0–0 (Egypt) Al Ahly
  - Dynamos (Zimbabwe) 0–1 (Cameroon) Cotonsport Garoua

==== Golf ====
- PGA Tour:
  - Turning Stone Resort Championship in Verona, New York
    Winner: (United States) Dustin Johnson 279 (9 under par)
- European Tour:
  - Alfred Dunhill Links Championship in Scotland
    Winner: (Sweden) Robert Karlsson 278 (10 under par)^{PO}
    Pro-Am winners: (England) John Bickerton & Bruce Watson
- LPGA Tour:
  - Samsung World Championship in Half Moon Bay, California
    Winner: (United States) Paula Creamer 279

==== Motorcycle racing ====
- Moto GP:
  - Australian motorcycle Grand Prix in Phillip Island, Australia
    - (1) (Australia) Casey Stoner (2) (Italy) Valentino Rossi (3) (United States) Nicky Hayden
- Superbike:
  - Magny-Cours Superbike World Championship round in Magny-Cours, France
    - Race 1 classification: (1) (Japan) Noriyuki Haga (2) (Spain) Fonsi Nieto (3) (Australia) Troy Bayliss
    - Race 2 classification: (1) (Australia) Troy Bayliss (2) (Japan) Noriyuki Haga (3) (Australia) Troy Corser
      - Troy Bayliss wins his 50th race, and secures his third Superbike World Championship.

==== Rugby league ====
- NRL Grand Final in Sydney:
  - Melbourne Storm 0–40 **Manly-Warringah Sea Eagles**

==== Tennis ====
- ATP Tour:
  - Open de Moselle in Metz, France
    Final: (Russia) **Dmitry Tursunov** def. (France) Paul-Henri Mathieu, 7–6(6), 1–6, 6–4
  - AIG Japan Open in Tokyo, Japan
    Final: (Czech Republic) **Tomáš Berdych** def. (Argentina) Juan Martín del Potro, 6–1, 6–4
- WTA Tour:
  - Porsche Tennis Grand Prix in Stuttgart, Germany
    Final: (Serbia) **Jelena Janković** def. (Russia) Nadia Petrova, 6–4, 6–3
  - AIG Japan Open in Tokyo, Japan
    Final: (Denmark) **Caroline Wozniacki** def. (Estonia) Kaia Kanepi, 6–2, 3–6, 6–1
  - Tashkent Open in Tashkent, Uzbekistan
    Final: (Romania) **Sorana Cîrstea** def. (Germany) Sabine Lisicki, 2–6, 6–4, 7–6(4)

=== October 4, 2008 (Saturday) ===
==== American college football ====
- NCAA AP Top 10:
  - (1) Oklahoma 49, Baylor 17
  - (2) Alabama 17, Kentucky 14
  - (4) Missouri 52, Nebraska 17
  - (5) Texas 38, Colorado 14
  - (6) Penn State 20, Purdue 6
    - The Nittany Lions are the first BCS conference team assured of bowl eligibility with their win at West Laffayette, Indiana.
  - (7) Texas Tech 58, Kansas State 28
  - (9) Southern California 44, (23) Oregon 10
- Other games:
  - (19) Vanderbilt 14, (13) Auburn 13
    - The Commodores go to 5–0 for the first time since 1943.
  - (14) Ohio State 20, (18) Wisconsin 17
    - The Badgers' 16-game winning streak at Camp Randall Stadium is snapped by the Buckeyes. Wisconsin's marching band was not at the game after being suspended for a hazing incident.
  - Hawaiʻi 32, (22) Fresno State 29 (OT)
  - North Carolina 38, (24) Connecticut 12

==== Baseball ====
- Major League Baseball postseason:
  - National League Division Series:
    - Milwaukee Brewers 4, Philadelphia Phillies 1. **Phillies lead series 2–1.**
      - The Brew Crew prevents the Phillies from their first post-season sweep.
    - Los Angeles Dodgers 3, Chicago Cubs 1. **Dodgers win series 3–0.**
      - The "Curse of the Billy Goat" continues as the Cubs are swept by the Dodgers, marking 100 years since last winning the World Series in 1908.

==== Ice hockey ====
- 2008–09 NHL season opening games:
  - New York Rangers 2, Tampa Bay Lightning 1 in Prague.
  - Pittsburgh Penguins 4, Ottawa Senators 3 (OT) in Stockholm.

==== Mixed Martial Arts ====
- EliteXC: Heat in Sunrise, Florida:
  - Seth Petruzelli, who replaced the injured Ken Shamrock, defeats Kimbo Slice by TKO on strikes in 14 seconds.

==== Rugby league ====
- Super League Grand Final in Manchester, England:
  - St. Helens 16–24 **Leeds Rhinos**

=== October 3, 2008 (Friday) ===
==== American College football ====
- NCAA AP Top 10:
  - (8) Brigham Young 34, Utah State 14
- Other news:
  - Hall of Famer O. J. Simpson is convicted on all 12 charges stemming from the armed robbery of two Las Vegas sports memorabilia dealers. He will be sentenced on December 5, and faces possible life imprisonment.

==== Baseball ====
- Major League Baseball postseason:
  - American League Division Series:
    - Tampa Bay Rays 6, Chicago White Sox 2. **Rays lead series 2–0.**
      - The Rays take a 2–0 advantage to Chicago.
    - Boston Red Sox 7, Los Angeles Angels 5. **Red Sox lead series 2–0.**
      - J. D. Drew's two-run ninth-inning home run off Francisco Rodríguez was the difference as the Bosox are one win away from another trip to the ALCS.

==== Basketball ====
- WNBA Finals:
  - Detroit Shock 69, San Antonio Silver Stars 61. **Shock lead series 2–0**
    - Katie Smith has another big game, following up her 25 points in Game 1 with 22 tonight. The series now goes to the Detroit area, and the Shock will go for the sweep Sunday in Ypsilanti.
- In other WNBA news, Candace Parker of the Los Angeles Sparks becomes the first player to be named the league's MVP and Rookie of the Year in the same season. Parker also won a gold medal for the USA Women's Basketball team in Beijing and the Most Outstanding Player in the Final Four.

==== Surfing ====
- Kelly Slater wins a ninth title of World champion of surfing in Mundaka, Spain.

=== October 2, 2008 (Thursday) ===
==== American college football ====
- NCAA AP Top 10:
  - Pittsburgh 26, (10) South Florida 21
    - The Panthers win their third straight game against a ranked team, thanks to LeSean McCoy's two rushing touchdowns.
- In another game:
  - (15) Utah 31, Oregon State 28
    - Louie Sakota's 37-yard walk-off field goal makes the 6–0 Utes the first bowl eligible team.

==== Auto racing ====
- Two-time Indianapolis 500 champion Hélio Castroneves is indicted by a United States federal grand jury in Miami on tax evasion charges. (ESPN.com)

==== Baseball ====
- Major League Baseball postseason:
  - American League Division Series:
    - Tampa Bay Rays 6, Chicago White Sox 4. **Rays lead series 1–0.**
      - Evan Longoria becomes the first player since Gary Gaetti to hit two homers in his postseason debut as the mohawk-wearing Rays become the third expansion team in AL history to win their first post-season game, joining Toronto (1985 ALCS) and Texas (1996 ALDS).
  - National League Division Series:
    - Philadelphia Phillies 5, Milwaukee Brewers 2. **Phillies lead series 2–0.**
      - Thanks to Shane Victorino's grand slam off CC Sabathia capping a five run third inning, rattling Sabathia like Burt Hooton in the 1977 NLCS, the Phillies are one victory away from a spot in the 2008 NLCS.
    - Los Angeles Dodgers 10, Chicago Cubs 3. **Dodgers lead series 2–0.**
      - Manny Ramírez was being Manny Ramírez again, with his second home run of the series and four Cubs errors lead the Dodgers to a 2–0 lead en route to Los Angeles for a possible sweep on Saturday.

==== Football (soccer) ====
- UEFA Cup, First round, Second leg:
  (First leg result in parentheses; teams advancing in **boldface**)
  - Wisła Kraków (Poland) 1–1 **Tottenham Hotspur** (England) (1–2)
  - Rapid București (Romania) 1–1 **Wolfsburg** (Germany) (0–1)
  - **Spartak Moscow** (Russia) 1–1 Baník Ostrava (Czech Republic) (1–0)
  - Kaunas (Lithuania) 1–2 **Sampdoria** (Italy) (0–5)
  - Unirea Urziceni (Romania) 0–2 **Hamburg** (Germany) (0–0)
  - **Schalke 04** (Germany) 1–1 APOEL Nicosia (Cyprus) (4–1)
  - **Lech Poznań** (Poland) 4–2 (ET) Austria Wien (1–2)
  - **Stuttgart** (Germany) 2–2 Cherno More (Bulgaria) (2–1)
  - Honka (Finland) 0–1 **Racing Santander** (Spain) (0–1)
  - Levski Sofia (Bulgaria) 0–1 **Žilina** (Slovakia) (1–1)
  - Kalmar (Sweden) 1–2 **Feyenoord** (Netherlands) (1–0)
  - **Rosenborg** (Norway) 3–2 Brøndby (Denmark) (2–1)
  - **Partizan Belgrade** (Serbia) 1–0 Timişoara (Romania) (2–1)
  - **Metalist Kharkiv** (Ukraine) 4–1 Beşiktaş (Turkey) (0–1)
  - **Galatasaray** (Turkey) 2–1 Bellinzona (Switzerland) (4–3)
  - **Saint-Étienne** (France) 2–1 Hapoel Tel Aviv (Israel) (2–1)
  - Dinamo București (Romania) 0–0 **NEC Nijmegen** (Netherlands) (0–1)
  - Vaslui (Romania) 1–1 **Slavia Prague** (Czech Republic) (0–0)
  - **Standard Liège** (Belgium) 2–1 Everton (England) (2–2)
  - **Heerenveen** (Netherlands) 5–2 Vitória Setúbal (Portugal) (1–1)
  - **Twente Enschede** (Netherlands) 1–0 Rennes (France) (1–2)
  - FC Zürich (Switzerland) 0–1 **Milan** (Italy) (1–3)
  - Sparta Prague (Czech Republic) 3–3 **Dinamo Zagreb** (Croatia) (0–0)
  - Artmedia Petržalka (Slovakia) 0–2 **Braga** (Portugal) (0–4)
  - Red Bull Salzburg (Austria) 0–2 **Sevilla** (Spain) (0–2)
  - **Ajax Amsterdam** (Netherlands) 2–0 Borac Čačak (Serbia) (4–1)
  - **Manchester City** (England) 2–1 Omonia Nicosia (Cyprus) (2–1)
  - **Club Brugge** (Belgium) 2–0 Young Boys Bern (Switzerland) (2–2)
  - Motherwell (Scotland) 0–2 **Nancy** (France) (0–1)
  - **Copenhagen** (Denmark) 1–1 FC Moscow (Russia) (2–1)
  - **Udinese** (Italy) 0–2 (ET) Borussia Dortmund (Germany) (2–0)
    - Udinese win 4:3 in penalty shootout
  - **Olympiacos Piraeus** (Greece) 5–0 Nordsjælland (Denmark) (2–0)
  - **Paris Saint-Germain** (France) 0–0 Kayserispor (Turkey) (2–1)
  - **Aston Villa** (England) 1–1 Litex Lovech (Bulgaria) (3–1)
  - **Deportivo La Coruña** (Spain) 2–0 (ET) Brann Bergen (Norway) (0–2)
    - Deportivo win 3:2 in penalty shootout
  - **Benfica** (Portugal) 2–0 Napoli (Italy) (2–3)
  - **Valencia** (Spain) 2–1 Marítimo (Portugal) (1–0)
  - Vitória Guimarães (Portugal) 2–2 (ET) **Portsmouth** (England) (0–2)
- Other news:
  - A Spanish judge has sent German authorities recordings alleging that Russian mobsters tried to fix the 2007–08 UEFA Cup semi-final between eventual champion Zenit St. Petersburg and Bayern Munich. Both clubs denied any knowledge of the alleged scheme. (Reuters via ESPNsoccernet.com)

=== October 1, 2008 (Wednesday) ===
==== Baseball ====
- Major League Baseball postseason:
  - American League Division Series:
    - Boston Red Sox 4, Los Angeles Angels 1. **Red Sox lead series 1–0**.
      - Jason Bay's post season debut included a home run and Jon Lester's seven innings of one-run pitching allows the defending world champions win their seventh straight post-season contest.
  - National League Division Series:
    - Los Angeles Dodgers 7, Chicago Cubs 2. **Dodgers lead series 1–0**.
      - Home runs prove crucial in this affair, as the Cubbies strike first via a two-run Mark DeRosa shot, but after Ryan Dempster walked the bases full James Loney knocked a grand slam to give the Dodgers an unassailable lead.
    - Philadelphia Phillies 3, Milwaukee Brewers 1. **Phillies lead series 1–0**.
      - The Phillies get all their scoring in the third inning, capitalizing on an error on Cole Hamels' sacrifice bunt, and capped by Chase Utley's two-run double. Hamels pitches eight scoreless innings, and Brad Lidge holds on in the ninth to give the Phils their first postseason win since Game 5 of the 1993 World Series.

==== Basketball ====
- WNBA Finals:
  - Detroit Shock 77, San Antonio Silver Stars 69. **Shock lead series 1–0**

==== Football (soccer) ====
- UEFA Champions League group stage, Matchday 2:
  - Group A: CFR Cluj (Romania) 0–0 (England) Chelsea
  - Group A: Bordeaux (France) 1–3 (Italy) Roma
  - Group B: Anorthosis (Cyprus) 3–1 (Greece) Panathinaikos
  - Group B: Internazionale (Italy) 1–1 (Germany) Werder Bremen
  - Group C: Sporting CP (Portugal) 2–0 (Switzerland) Basel
  - Group C: Shakhtar Donetsk (Ukraine) 1–2 (Spain) Barcelona
  - Group D: Liverpool (England) 3–1 (Netherlands) PSV Eindhoven
  - Group D: Atlético Madrid (Spain) 2–1 (France) Marseille
