= New Zealand cricket team in Bangladesh in 2008–09 =

New Zealand cricket team in Bangladesh in 2008-09
	Bangladesh	New Zealand
- Dates: 7 October 2008 – 29 October 2008
Captains	Mohammad Ashraful	Daniel Vettori

Test series
- Result: New Zealand won the 2-match series 1–0
Most runs	Shakib Al Hasan 125	Jesse Ryder 169
Most wickets	Shakib Al Hasan 10	Daniel Vettori 14
- Player of the series: Daniel Vettori (NZ)

One Day International series
- Results: New Zealand won the 3-match series 2–1
Most runs	Junaid Siddique 118	Ross Taylor 138
Most wickets	Mashrafe Mortaza 7	Kyle Mills 6
- Player of the series: Jacob Oram (NZ)

The New Zealand cricket team toured Bangladesh for two Test matches and three One Day International (ODI) matches in 2008–09. Bangladesh were under the captaincy of Mohammad Ashraful and the New Zealanders were led by Daniel Vettori. Starting on 9 October 2008, the New Zealanders won the ODI series 2-1 and the following Test series 1–0.

== ODI series ==
=== 1st ODI ===
9 October
(scorecard)

New Zealand; 201/9 (50 overs)	v	Bangladesh; 202/3 (45.3 overs)
Jacob Oram 57 (89); Mashrafe Mortaza 4/44 (10 overs)		Junaid Siddique 85 (139); Scott Styris 1/23 (6 overs)

Bangladesh won by 7 wickets
Sher-e-Bangla Cricket Stadium, Dhaka, Bangladesh
Umpires: Daryl Harper (AUS) & Nadir Shah (BAN)
Player of the match: Junaid Siddique

=== 2nd ODI ===
11 October
(scorecard)

New Zealand; 212/9 (50.0 overs)	v	Bangladesh; 137 all out (42.4 overs)
Jacob Oram 75* (101); Syed Rasel 3/23 (10 overs)		Mohammad Ashraful 40 (120); Kyle Mills 3/13 (6.4 overs)

New Zealand won by 75 runs
Sher-e-Bangla Cricket Stadium, Dhaka, Bangladesh
Umpires: Daryl Harper (AUS) & Nadir Shah (BAN)
Player of the match: Jacob Oram

=== 3rd ODI ===
14 October
(scorecard)

New Zealand; 249/7 (50 overs)	v	Bangladesh; 170/8 (50 overs)
Ross Taylor 103 (119); Jacob Oram 2/16 (8 overs)		Naeem Islam 46 (106); Shakib Al Hasan 2/41 (10 overs)

New Zealand won by 79 runs
Zohur Ahmed Chowdhury Stadium, Chittagong
Umpires: Enamul Haque (BAN) & Daryl Harper (AUS)
Player of the match: Ross Taylor (NZ)

== Test series ==
=== 1st test ===
17–21 October
(scorecard)

Bangladesh	v	New Zealand
245 (122.1 overs); Mehrab Hossain jnr 83 (179); Daniel Vettori 5/59 (36 overs)		171 (64.5 overs); Daniel Vettori 55* (82); Shakib Al Hasan 7/36 (25.5 overs)
242 (107.3 overs); Shakib Al Hasan 71 (151); Daniel Vettori 4/74 (42 overs)		317/7 (137.5 overs); Aaron Redmond 79 (237); Abdur Razzak 3/93 (50 overs)

New Zealand won by 3 wickets
Zohur Ahmed Chowdhury Stadium, Chittagong
Umpires: Asoka de Silva (SL) and Daryl Harper (Aus)
Player of the match: Daniel Vettori (NZ)

=== 2nd test ===
25–29 October
(scorecard)

New Zealand	v	Bangladesh
262/6 dec. (75 overs); Jesse Ryder 91(140); M Ashraful 1/7 (3 overs)		169/9 dec. (58.1 overs); Shakib Al Hasan 49(87); Daniel Vettori 5/66 (19 overs)
79/1 (19 overs); Jesse Ryder* 39(84); M Mortaza 1/14 (5 overs)

Match drawn
Sher-e-Bangla Cricket Stadium, Dhaka, Bangladesh
Umpires: Asoka de Silva (SL) and Daryl Harper (Aus)
Player of the match: Daniel Vettori (NZ)

- No play on days 1, 2 & 3

== Tour match ==
=== Bangladesh Cricket Board XI vs New Zealand ===
7 October

Bangladesh Cricket Board XI	v	New Zealand

Match abandoned without a ball bowled
Fatullah Osmani Stadium, Fatullah
