= 2008 Associates Tri-Series in Kenya =

- Date: 17 October 2008 – 25 October 2008
- Location: Kenya
- Result: Shared between Zimbabwe and Kenya
Teams
| Ireland | Kenya | Zimbabwe |
Captains
| William Porterfield | Steve Tikolo | Prosper Utseya |
Most runs
| Kevin O'Brien 121 Andrew White 58 William Porterfield 51 | Steve Tikolo 116; Alex Obanda 71; Seren Waters 61 | Tatenda Taibu 99; Stuart Matsikenyeri 83; Hamilton Masakadza 73 |
Most wickets
| Alex Cusack 4 Peter Connell 3 Andrew White & Regan West & Trent Johnston & Andre Botha & Boyd Rankin 2 | Hiren Varaiya 4 Steve Tikolo 3 Nehemiah Odhiambo & Elijah Otieno & Jimmy Kamande 2 | Christopher Mpofu 6 Keith Dabengwa & Prosper Utseya 3 |

The 2008 Associates Tri-Series in Kenya is a One Day International cricket tournament which was held in Kenya from October 17 to October 25, 2008. The tri-series involves the national teams of Ireland, Kenya and Zimbabwe.

== Group stage ==
=== Points table ===
| Pos | Team | Pld | W | L | NR | Pts | NRR |
|---|---|---|---|---|---|---|---|
| 1 | Zimbabwe | 4 | 1 | 1 | 2 | 9 | 0.610 |
| 2 | Kenya | 4 | 1 | 1 | 2 | 9 | 0.093 |
| 3 | Ireland | 4 | 1 | 1 | 2 | 9 | −0.722 |

=== Matches ===
17 October
Scorecard

| Zimbabwe; 303/8 (50 overs) | v | Ireland; 147 (46.1 overs) |
| Tatenda Taibu 74 (99); Peter Connell 3/68 (8 overs) | | Kevin O'Brien 38 (63); Keith Dabengwa 3/17 (6 overs) |

Zimbabwe won by 156 runs
Gymkhana Club Ground, Nairobi
Umpires: Marais Erasmus (SA) and Russell Tiffin (Zim)

- Points: Zimbabwe 5, Ireland 0

18 October
Sorecard

| Ireland; 285/6 (47/47 overs) | v | Kenya; 199 (44/47 overs) |
| Kevin O'Brien 83 (52); Steve Tikolo 2/43 (8 overs) | | Jimmy Kamande 42 (48); Alex Cusack 3/29 (6 overs) |

Ireland won by 86 runs
Gymkhana Club Ground, Nairobi
Umpires: Subhash Modi (Ken) and Russell Tiffin (Zim)

- Points: Ireland 5, Kenya 0

19 October
Scorecard

| Kenya; 285/9 (50 overs) | v | Zimbabwe; 190 (38.1 overs) |
| Steve Tikolo 102 (99); Chris Mpofu 6/52 (10 overs) | | Stuart Matsikenyeri 56 (36); Hiren Varaiya 3/53 (10 overs) |

Kenya won by 95 runs
Gymkhana Club Ground, Nairobi
Umpires: Marais Erasmus (SA) and Subhash Modi (Ken)

- Points: Kenya 5, Zimbabwe 0

21 October
Scorecard

| Ireland | v | Zimbabwe |

Match abandoned without a ball bowled
Gymkhana Club Ground, Nairobi
Umpires: Marais Erasmus (SA) and Russell Tiffin (Zim)

- Points: Ireland 2, Zimbabwe 2

22 October
Scorecard

| Kenya | v | Ireland |

Match abandoned without a ball bowled
Gymkhana Club Ground, Nairobi
Umpires: Subhash Modi (Ken) and Russell Tiffin (Zim)

- Points: Kenya 2, Ireland 2

23 October
Scorecard

| Kenya | v | Zimbabwe |

Match abandoned without a ball bowled
Gymkhana Club Ground, Nairobi
Umpires: Marais Erasmus (SA) and Subhash Modi (Ken)

- Points: Kenya 2, Zimbabwe 2

== Final ==
25 October
Scorecard

| Kenya | v | Zimbabwe |

Match abandoned without a ball bowled
Gymkhana Club Ground, Nairobi
Umpires: Marais Erasmus (SA) and Russell Tiffin (Zim)
