= World Chess Championship 2008 =

Chess match between Viswanathan Anand and Vladimir Kramnik

	Defending champion	Challenger
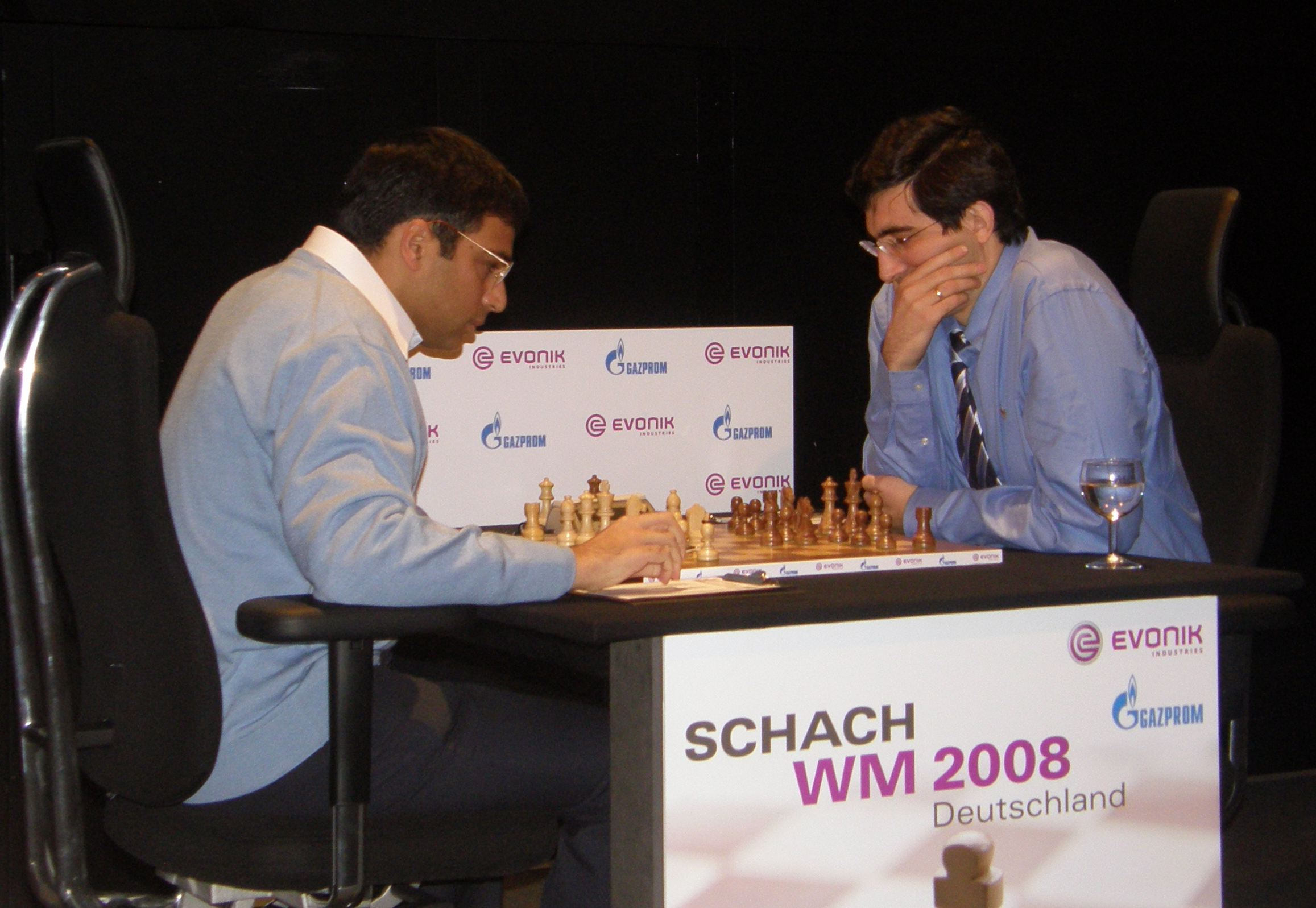
- Viswanathan Anand and Vladimir Kramnik
	(India) Viswanathan Anand	(Russia) Vladimir Kramnik
6½	Scores	4½
	Born 11 December 1969; 38 years old	Born 25 June 1975; 33 years old
	Winner of the 2007 World Chess Championship	Winner of the 2006 World Chess Championship
	Rating: 2783 (World No. 5)	Rating: 2772 (World No. 6)

The World Chess Championship 2008 was a best-of-twelve-games match between the incumbent World Chess Champion, Viswanathan Anand, and the previous World Champion, Vladimir Kramnik. Kramnik had been granted a match after losing the World Chess Championship 2007 tournament.

After eleven games, Anand successfully defended his title by a final score of 6½–4½ (three victories and one defeat).

The match took place at the Art and Exhibition Hall of the Federal Republic of Germany in Bonn, Germany, between 14 October and 29 October 2008.

== Background ==
The match was a one-off event in which the previous world champion (Vladimir Kramnik) had been given the right to challenge to regain his title. Its origin was in the complications in reunifying the world title in 2006.

The chess world title was split between 1993 and 2006. In early 2006, FIDE had already announced the conditions for the World Chess Championship 2007: an eight-player tournament which included FIDE World Champion Veselin Topalov, but not "Classical" World Champion Vladimir Kramnik. FIDE later organized a reunification match between Kramnik and Topalov (the World Chess Championship 2006), with Kramnik to take Topalov's place in the 2007 tournament if he was to win the match. Kramnik did win the match and the reunified World Chess Championship, and so Topalov was excluded from the 2007 World Championship.

In June 2007 FIDE announced that Topalov would get special privileges in the World Chess Championship 2010 qualifying cycle, while Kramnik, if he lost his title in 2007 (which he did, coming second behind Viswanathan Anand), would play a match with the tournament champion in 2008.

== Previous head-to-head record ==
Before the 2008 match, Anand and Kramnik played 51 games against each other with the following statistics:

	Anand wins	Draws	Kramnik wins
Anand (white) – Kramnik (black)	2	19	0
Kramnik (white) – Anand (black)	2	22	6
Total	4	41	6

== Match conditions ==
The match format was the best of 12 games. Players scored 1 point for a win and half a point for a draw. Time control was 120 minutes, with 60 minutes added after move 40, 15 minutes added after move 60, and 30 additional seconds per move starting from move 61. The match ended once any player scored 6½ points.

The match regulations specified a series of three tie breaks:

1. If the score is tied after 12 games, colors will be drawn and four rapid games will be played. The time control for these games will be 25 minutes plus 10 seconds per move.
2. If the score is tied after the four rapid tie break games, colors will be drawn and two blitz games (5 minutes plus 10 seconds increment per move) will be played.
3. If the score is tied after the two blitz games, a single sudden-death "Armageddon game" will determine the champion. The winner of a draw of lots gets to choose the color to play, with White given 6 minutes and Black 5 minutes and no time increment added per move. If the game is drawn then the player of the black pieces is declared champion.

=== Seconds and help ===
Anand's seconds who helped his preparation were: Peter Heine Nielsen, Rustam Kasimdzhanov, Surya Ganguly and Radosław Wojtaszek. In a post-match interview Anand mentioned that Magnus Carlsen had also helped him in preparation.

Kramnik's seconds were Peter Leko, Sergei Rublevsky and Laurent Fressinet, while Peter Svidler and Alexander Motylev declined to join the team.

== Schedule and results ==
Game	Date	Kramnik	Anand	Standing
1	14 October	½	½	Match level ½–½
2	15 October	½	½	Match level 1–1
3	17 October	0	1	Anand leads 2–1
4	18 October	½	½	Anand leads 2½–1½
5	20 October	0	1	Anand leads 3½–1½
6	21 October	0	1	Anand leads 4½–1½
7	23 October	½	½	Anand leads 5–2
8	24 October	½	½	Anand leads 5½–2½
9	26 October	½	½	Anand leads 6–3
10	27 October	1	0	Anand leads 6–4
11	29 October	½	½	Anand wins 6½–4½
12	31 October	Not required		
Tiebreak	2 November	Not required		

All games started at 3:00 pm CET (UTC+2 until October 25, UTC+1 from October 26)

== Games ==
=== Game 1, Kramnik–Anand, ½–½ ===
Game 1

Position: c8 black rook, d8 black queen, f8 black rook, g8 black king, a7 black pawn, b7 black pawn, f7 black pawn, g7 black pawn, h7 black pawn, c6 white bishop, e6 black pawn, d5 black pawn, b4 white queen, d4 white pawn, f4 white bishop, g4 black bishop, e3 white pawn, a2 white pawn, b2 white pawn, f2 white pawn, g2 white pawn, h2 white pawn, a1 white rook, e1 white king, h1 white rook

Anand sacrificed a pawn with 14...Rxc6.

Game 1 ended in a draw after Anand gave up a pawn but had sufficient counterplay to draw easily.

Slav Defense, D14
1.d4 d5 2.c4 c6 3.Nc3 Nf6 4.cxd5 cxd5 5.Bf4 Nc6 6.e3 Bf5 7.Nf3 e6 8.Qb3 Bb4 9.Bb5 0-0 10.Bxc6 Bxc3+ 11.Qxc3 Rc8 12.Ne5 Ng4 13.Nxg4 Bxg4 14.Qb4 Rxc6 15.Qxb7 Qc8 16.Qxc8 Rfxc8 17.0-0 a5 18.f3 Bf5 19.Rfe1 Bg6 20.b3 f6 21.e4 dxe4 22.fxe4 Rd8 23.Rad1 Rc2 24.e5 fxe5 25.Bxe5 Rxa2 26.Ra1 Rxa1 27.Rxa1 Rd5 28.Rc1 Rd7 29.Rc5 Ra7 30.Rc7 Rxc7 31.Bxc7 Bc2 32.Bxa5 Bxb3 ½–½

=== Game 2, Anand–Kramnik, ½–½ ===
Game 2 ended in a draw although White retained some advantage. The draw is explained by the time situation. Anand was down to only 2 minutes and 33 seconds while Kramnik had 9 minutes and 54 seconds.

Nimzo-Indian Defense, E25
1.d4 Nf6 2.c4 e6 3.Nc3 Bb4 4.f3 d5 5.a3 Bxc3+ 6.bxc3 c5 7.cxd5 Nxd5 8.dxc5 f5 9.Qc2 Nd7 10.e4 fxe4 11.fxe4 N5f6 12.c6 bxc6 13.Nf3 Qa5 14.Bd2 Ba6 15.c4 Qc5 16.Bd3 Ng4 17.Bb4 Qe3+ 18.Qe2 0-0-0 19.Qxe3 Nxe3 20.Kf2 Ng4+ 21.Kg3 Ndf6 22.Bb1 h5 23.h3 h4+ 24.Nxh4 Ne5 25.Nf3 Nh5+ 26.Kf2 Nxf3 27.Kxf3 e5 28.Rc1 Nf4 29.Ra2 Nd3 30.Rc3 Nf4 31.Bc2 Ne6 32.Kg3 Rd4 ½–½

=== Game 3, Kramnik–Anand, 0–1 ===
Game 3

Position: e6 black pawn, f6 black pawn, h6 black king, b5 white bishop, f5 black bishop, h5 black pawn, a4 white pawn, d4 black queen, f4 white pawn, a3 white rook, f3 white pawn, b2 white pawn, c2 white king, e2 white queen, h2 white pawn, g1 black rook

Here Kramnik responded to the check with 33.Bd3, rendering himself "doomed", according to GM Dimitrov.

In game 3, Anand chose a razor-sharp variation of the Meran Variation of the Semi-Slav Defence; following a little-played line (14...Bb7) and played a new idea (17. ... Rg4) which led to the sacrifice of two pawns. (Anand later said that this was largely prepared by his second Rustam Kasimdzhanov.) Anand achieved a vicious attack and despite simplified material, Kramnik was unable to defend successfully. GM Vladimir Dimitrov wrote, "Vishy took early the initiative in this game and forced Kramnik into a time trouble. This led to the 25.Qe2 inaccuracy and subsequently to 33.Bd3?? when White was doomed." Anand was himself low on time and did not find 33...Bxd3+, which wins immediately, but the move he played (33...Bh3) also won.

Queen's Gambit Declined, Meran Variation, D49
1.d4 d5 2.c4 c6 3.Nf3 Nf6 4.Nc3 e6 5.e3 Nbd7 6.Bd3 dxc4 7.Bxc4 b5 8.Bd3 a6 9.e4 c5 10.e5 cxd4 11.Nxb5 axb5 12.exf6 gxf6 13.0-0 Qb6 14.Qe2 Bb7 15.Bxb5 Bd6 16.Rd1 Rg8 17.g3 Rg4 18.Bf4 Bxf4 19.Nxd4 h5 20.Nxe6 fxe6 21.Rxd7 Kf8 22.Qd3 Rg7 23.Rxg7 Kxg7 24.gxf4 Rd8 25.Qe2 Kh6 26.Kf1 Rg8 27.a4 Bg2+ 28.Ke1 Bh3 29.Ra3 Rg1+ 30.Kd2 Qd4+ 31.Kc2 Bg4 32.f3 Bf5+ 33.Bd3 Bh3 34.a5 Rg2 35.a6 Rxe2+ 36.Bxe2 Bf5+ 37.Kb3 Qe3+ 38.Ka2 Qxe2 39.a7 Qc4+ 40.Ka1 Qf1+ 41.Ka2 Bb1+ 0–1

=== Game 4, Anand–Kramnik, ½–½ ===
In game 4, Kramnik held the draw as Black in a quiet variation of the Queen's Gambit. Black accepted the isolated d-pawn in return for an active position and a lead in development and never appeared to be in serious trouble.

Queen's Gambit Declined, D37
1.d4 Nf6 2.c4 e6 3.Nf3 d5 4.Nc3 Be7 5.Bf4 0-0 6.e3 Nbd7 7.a3 c5 8.cxd5 Nxd5 9.Nxd5 exd5 10.dxc5 Nxc5 11.Be5 Bf5 12.Be2 Bf6 13.Bxf6 Qxf6 14.Nd4 Ne6 15.Nxf5 Qxf5 16.0-0 Rfd8 17.Bg4 Qe5 18.Qb3 Nc5 19.Qb5 b6 20.Rfd1 Rd6 21.Rd4 a6 22.Qb4 h5 23.Bh3 Rad8 24.g3 g5 25.Rad1 g4 26.Bg2 Ne6 27.R4d3 d4 28.exd4 Rxd4 29.Rxd4 Rxd4 ½–½

=== Game 5, Kramnik–Anand, 0–1 ===
Game 5

Position: b7 black bishop, d7 black knight, e7 black king, f7 black pawn, h7 black pawn, e6 black pawn, f6 black queen, b5 white bishop, a4 white pawn, b4 white pawn, d4 black pawn, f4 black pawn, g4 white queen, c3 black rook, f3 white knight, f2 white pawn, g2 white pawn, h2 white pawn, e1 white rook, g1 white king

The game was balanced until Kramnik blundered, playing 29.Nxd4 in this position. After Anand captured the knight with 29...Qxd4, Kramnik replied with 30.Rd1 Nf6 31.Rxd4 Nxg4 32.Rd7+ Kf6 33.Rxb7, apparently regaining the piece. But Anand had seen further, and was winning after 33...Rc1+ 34.Bf1 Ne3! 35.fxe3 fxe3.
Game 5

Position: b7 white rook, f7 black pawn, h7 black pawn, e6 black pawn, f6 black king, a4 white pawn, b4 white pawn, e3 black pawn, g2 white pawn, h2 white pawn, c1 black rook, f1 white bishop, g1 white king

Final position. Kramnik (white) cannot stop the pawn from queening. Anand had to see this when playing his 28th move, while Kramnik missed it when making his 29th.

Repeating the same sharp line which brought victory in game 3, Anand sidestepped whatever antidote Kramnik had prepared by interpolating 15...Rg8 before Bd6. If Kramnik had continued 16.Rd1, Anand could have transposed to the previous game by 16...Bd6 or played any of the alternatives, such as 16...Ra5. As played (16.Bf4) the game developed with equal chances for both sides. By move 28 Anand was slightly better, and Kramnik blundered with 29.Nxd4?? (probably missing 34... Ne3!), which loses at least a piece and the game.

Queen's Gambit Declined, Meran Variation, D49
1.d4 d5 2.c4 c6 3.Nf3 Nf6 4.Nc3 e6 5.e3 Nbd7 6.Bd3 dxc4 7.Bxc4 b5 8.Bd3 a6 9.e4 c5 10.e5 cxd4 11.Nxb5 axb5 12.exf6 gxf6 13.0-0 Qb6 14.Qe2 Bb7 15.Bxb5 Rg8 16.Bf4 Bd6 17.Bg3 f5 18.Rfc1 f4 19.Bh4 Be7 20.a4 Bxh4 21.Nxh4 Ke7 22.Ra3 Rac8 23.Rxc8 Rxc8 24.Ra1 Qc5 25.Qg4 Qe5 26.Nf3 Qf6 27.Re1 Rc5 28.b4 Rc3 29.Nxd4 Qxd4 30.Rd1 Nf6 31.Rxd4 Nxg4 32.Rd7+ Kf6 33.Rxb7 Rc1+ 34.Bf1 Ne3 35.fxe3 fxe3 0–1

=== Game 6, Anand–Kramnik, 1–0 ===
Game 6 was another win for Anand. Anand played a novelty in the Nimzo-Indian (9.h3). Kramnik, in a somewhat difficult position, sacrificed a pawn with 18...c5?!, but it did not work and he was a pawn down for little compensation. Anand then converted the pawn advantage into a win.

Nimzo-Indian Defence, E34
1.d4 Nf6 2.c4 e6 3.Nc3 Bb4 4.Qc2 d5 5.cxd5 Qxd5 6.Nf3 Qf5 7.Qb3 Nc6 8.Bd2 0-0 9.h3 b6 10.g4 Qa5 11.Rc1 Bb7 12.a3 Bxc3 13.Bxc3 Qd5 14.Qxd5 Nxd5 15.Bd2 Nf6 16.Rg1 Rac8 17.Bg2 Ne7 18.Bb4 c5 19.dxc5 Rfd8 20.Ne5 Bxg2 21.Rxg2 bxc5 22.Rxc5 Ne4 23.Rxc8 Rxc8 24.Nd3 Nd5 25.Bd2 Rc2 26.Bc1 f5 27.Kd1 Rc8 28.f3 Nd6 29.Ke1 a5 30.e3 e5 31.gxf5 e4 32.fxe4 Nxe4 33.Bd2 a4 34.Nf2 Nd6 35.Rg4 Nc4 36.e4 Nf6 37.Rg3 Nxb2 38.e5 Nd5 39.f6 Kf7 40.Ne4 Nc4 41.fxg7 Kg8 42.Rd3 Ndb6 43.Bh6 Nxe5 44.Nf6+ Kf7 45.Rc3 Rxc3 46.g8=Q+ Kxf6 47.Bg7+ 1–0

=== Game 7, Anand–Kramnik, ½–½ ===
Game 7

Position: f7 black king, g7 black pawn, b6 black pawn, e6 black pawn, a5 black pawn, b5 white pawn, c5 black rook, e5 white pawn, g5 black pawn, a4 white pawn, g4 white pawn, c3 white rook, d3 white king, e3 white pawn, h3 white pawn

Kramnik (Black) was under pressure, but kept the draw. After White finally accepted the sacrificed pawn, all Black has to do is exchange rooks (36...Rxc3+), and all the black pawns are out of reach for the opposing king.

Kramnik chose the Slav Defense, and obtained a slightly worse position. ('Kramnik said it was "maybe not the best choice" given his large deficit, but "it's not so easy to get winning chances" with Black against 1.d4.') Kramnik offered a draw on move 21, but Anand declined. Kramnik was under pressure but sacrificed a pawn to reach a drawn endgame.

Slav Defense, D19
1.d4 d5 2.c4 c6 3.Nf3 Nf6 4.Nc3 dxc4 5.a4 Bf5 6.e3 e6 7.Bxc4 Bb4 8.0-0 Nbd7 9.Qe2 Bg6 10.e4 0-0 11.Bd3 Bh5 12.e5 Nd5 13.Nxd5 cxd5 14.Qe3 Re8 15.Ne1 Bg6 16.Bxg6 hxg6 17.Nd3 Qb6 18.Nxb4 Qxb4 19.b3 Rac8 20.Ba3 Qc3 21.Rac1 Qxe3 22.fxe3 f6 23.Bd6 g5 24.h3 Kf7 25.Kf2 Kg6 26.Ke2 fxe5 27.dxe5 b6 28.b4 Rc4 29.Rxc4 dxc4 30.Rc1 Rc8 31.g4 a5 32.b5 c3 33.Rc2 Kf7 34.Kd3 Nc5+ 35.Bxc5 Rxc5 36.Rxc3 Rxc3+ ½–½

=== Game 8, Kramnik–Anand, ½–½ ===
Queen's Gambit Declined, Vienna Variation, D39
1.d4 Nf6 2.c4 e6 3.Nf3 d5 4.Nc3 dxc4 5.e4 Bb4 6.Bg5 c5 7.Bxc4 cxd4 8.Nxd4 Qa5 9.Bb5+ Bd7 10.Bxf6 Bxb5 11.Ndxb5 gxf6 12.0-0 Nc6 13.a3 Bxc3 14.Nxc3 Rg8 15.f4 Rd8 16.Qe1 Qb6+ 17.Rf2 Rd3 18.Qe2 Qd4 19.Re1 a6 20.Kh1 Kf8 21.Ref1 Rg6 22.g3 Kg7 23.Rd1 Rxd1+ 24.Nxd1 Kh8 25.Nc3 Rg8 26.Kg2 Rd8 27.Qh5 Kg7 28.Qg4+ Kh8 29.Qh5 Kg7 30.Qg4+ Kh8 31.Qh4 Kg7 32.e5 f5 33.Qf6+ Kg8 34.Qg5+ Kh8 35.Qf6+ Kg8 36.Re2 Qc4 37.Qg5+ Kh8 38.Qf6+ Kg8 39.Qg5+ Kh8 ½–½

=== Game 9, Anand–Kramnik, ½–½ ===
Game 9

Position: b8 black bishop, f8 black rook, h8 black king, b7 white queen, e6 black pawn, h6 black pawn, a5 black pawn, e5 black queen, f5 black pawn, b3 white pawn, c3 black rook, d3 white bishop, g3 white pawn, h2 white pawn, d1 white rook, f1 white rook, h1 white king

Kramnik had put pressure on Anand right from the start, and finally forced the Indian into a mistake. The Russian was winning, but he immediately returned the favor with (35. ...Qc7?), and allowed Anand to draw. After this result, the match was virtually over.

Anand came closest to defeat so far in a tense theoretical battle of the Moscow Gambit. Anand missed a clear drawing line (35.Bf5!) only for Kramnik to return the favour with a weak reply (35...Qc7?), after which Anand was able to comfortably draw.

Semi-Slav Defense, D43
1.d4 d5 2.c4 e6 3.Nf3 Nf6 4.Nc3 c6 5.Bg5 h6 6.Bh4 dxc4 7.e4 g5 8.Bg3 b5 9.Be2 Bb7 10.Qc2 Nbd7 11.Rd1 Bb4 12.Ne5 Qe7 13.0-0 Nxe5 14.Bxe5 0-0 15.Bxf6 Qxf6 16.f4 Qg7 17.e5 c5 18.Nxb5 cxd4 19.Qxc4 a5 20.Kh1 Rac8 21.Qxd4 gxf4 22.Bf3 Ba6 23.a4 Rc5 24.Qxf4 Rxe5 25.b3 Bxb5 26.axb5 Rxb5 27.Be4 Bc3 28.Bc2 Be5 29.Qf2 Bb8 30.Qf3 Rc5 31.Bd3 Rc3 32.g3 Kh8 33.Qb7 f5 34.Qb6 Qe5 35.Qb7 Qc7 36.Qxc7 Bxc7 37.Bc4 Re8 38.Rd7 a4 39.Rxc7 axb3 40.Rf2 Rb8 41.Rb2 h5 42.Kg2 h4 43.Rc6 hxg3 44.hxg3 Rg8 45.Rxe6 Rxc4 ½–½

=== Game 10, Kramnik–Anand, 1–0 ===
Game 10

Position: a8 black rook, c8 black rook, e8 black queen, g8 black king, a7 black pawn, b7 white rook, g7 black pawn, h7 black pawn, d6 white queen, e6 black bishop, f6 black pawn, a5 white pawn, e5 black pawn, a4 black knight, c4 black pawn, e4 white pawn, c3 white pawn, e3 white bishop, g3 white pawn, f2 white pawn, h2 white pawn, e1 white rook, f1 white bishop, g1 white king

The final position. White has several threats: 30.Re7 (winning the bishop), 30.Qb4 (trapping the knight) and later Rxa7 or Bxc4.

Kramnik won his only game of the championship.

Nimzo-Indian Defense, Romanishin Variation, English Hybrid, E20
1.d4 Nf6 2.c4 e6 3.Nc3 Bb4 4.Nf3 c5 5.g3 cxd4 6.Nxd4 0-0 7.Bg2 d5 8.cxd5 Nxd5 9.Qb3 Qa5 10.Bd2 Nc6 11.Nxc6 bxc6 12.0-0 Bxc3 13.bxc3 Ba6 14.Rfd1 Qc5 15.e4 Bc4 16.Qa4 Nb6 17.Qb4 Qh5 18.Re1 c5 19.Qa5 Rfc8 20.Be3 Be2 21.Bf4 e5 22.Be3 Bg4 23.Qa6 f6 24.a4 Qf7 25.Bf1 Be6 26.Rab1 c4 27.a5 Na4 28.Rb7 Qe8 29.Qd6 1–0

=== Game 11, Anand–Kramnik, ½–½ ===
Game 11

Position: c8 black rook, f8 black king, g8 black rook, b7 black pawn, e7 black knight, f7 black pawn, h7 black pawn, a6 black pawn, f5 black pawn, e3 black bishop, a2 white pawn, b2 white pawn, c2 white pawn, f2 white rook, g2 white pawn, h2 white pawn, b1 white king, c1 white knight, f1 white bishop, h1 white rook

In this position, in which only White has winning chances, a draw was agreed, thus ensuring that Anand retained the title of World Chess Champion.

Game 11 was the only game in the match to open with 1. e4. After a flurry of exchanges, Anand and Kramnik agreed to a draw after 24 moves, allowing Anand to retain the title.

Sicilian Defence, Najdorf Variation, B96
1.e4 c5 2.Nf3 d6 3.d4 cxd4 4.Nxd4 Nf6 5.Nc3 a6 6.Bg5 e6 7.f4 Qc7 8.Bxf6 gxf6 9.f5 Qc5 10.Qd3 Nc6 11.Nb3 Qe5 12.0-0-0 exf5 13.Qe3 Bg7 14.Rd5 Qe7 15.Qg3 Rg8 16.Qf4 fxe4 17.Nxe4 f5 18.Nxd6+ Kf8 19.Nxc8 Rxc8 20.Kb1 Qe1+ 21.Nc1 Ne7 22.Qd2 Qxd2 23.Rxd2 Bh6 24.Rf2 Be3 ½–½

== Match results ==
World Chess Championship Match 2008
	Rating	1	2	3	4	5	6	7	8	9	10	11	Total
Viswanathan Anand (India)	2783	½	½	1	½	1	1	½	½	½	0	½	6½
Vladimir Kramnik (Russia)	2772	½	½	0	½	0	0	½	½	½	1	½	4½
