= Australian cricket team in India in 2008–09 =

2008–09 Border–Gavaskar Trophy
- Date: 27 September – 10 November 2008
- Location: India
- Result: India won the 4-match series 2–0
- Player of the series: (India) Ishant Sharma
Teams
- Australia: India
Captains
- Ricky Ponting: Anil Kumble
Most runs
- Michael Hussey (394): Gautam Gambhir (463)
Most wickets
- Mitchell Johnson (13): Ishant Sharma (15); Harbhajan Singh (15)

The Australian cricket team toured India from 27 September to 10 November 2008 and played four test matches, for the Border–Gavaskar Trophy. During the second test match in Mohali Sachin Tendulkar became the first person to make 12,000 runs in Test cricket breaking Brian Lara's record of 11,953 runs. Sachin described "It is definitely the biggest achievement in 19 years of my career" on the day he achieved the record. India's 320 run victory in the second test match was also their biggest win against Australia in terms of runs, eclipsing the 222-run victory that came in Melbourne in 1977 and their biggest test win ever in terms of runs. In the first innings of the third test match in Delhi, Gautam Gambhir and V. V. S. Laxman became the first Indian players to both score a double century in a test innings. This series also witnessed the last Tests of two Indian cricketers – Anil Kumble and Sourav Ganguly.

== Security concerns and controversy before the tour ==
Before the Australian cricket team was scheduled to tour India and play a series of Test matches, one-day internationals and Twenty20 matches, it was doubtful if the Australian cricket team would tour India after the terror attacks in Delhi and the press briefing given by India's National Security Advisor M. K. Narayan that raised issues of security concern in the minds of Australia's cricketers.

On 13 September 2008, serial bomb blasts took place in India's capital city Delhi in which 30 people died and over 100 people were injured. The very next day after the blasts, Cricket Australia (CA) issued a statement saying that it would review the security situation in the wake of the blasts and make its decision the next week after performing a risk assessment. The Board of Control for Cricket in India, however, asserted that the blast would have no bearing on the cricket tour which would go ahead as scheduled. However, a conflicting report made on 15 September claimed that the CA had briefed that the tour was on track. Following these reports, the Pakistan Cricket Board (PCB) lashed at the Australian cricket establishment for agreeing to tour India while postponing their tour to Pakistan in early 2008 and accused the Board of adopting double standards. One PCB official even called the Australians "lilly-livered cowards" But Ricky Ponting issued a statement vindicating CA's stand by saying that the circumstances accompanying the cancellation of Australia's tour of Pakistan were entirely different. before adding on 17 September that the tour was not confirmed yet and that it could go either way.

== Squads ==
Test Squads
India	Australia
Anil Kumble (c)	Ricky Ponting (c)
MS Dhoni (vc) (wk)	Brad Haddin (wk)(vc)
Virender Sehwag	Michael Clarke
Rahul Dravid	Matthew Hayden
Sourav Ganguly	Shaun Marsh
V. V. S. Laxman	Michael Hussey
Harbhajan Singh	Cameron White
Rudra Pratap Singh	Simon Katich
Munaf Patel	Shane Watson
Zaheer Khan	Doug Bollinger
Gautam Gambhir	Peter Siddle
Sachin Tendulkar	Jason Krejza
Subramaniam Badrinath	Mitchell Johnson
Amit Mishra	Stuart Clark
Ishant Sharma	Brett Lee
Murali Vijay	Bryce McGain

== Tour matches ==
=== Two-day: Rajasthan Cricket Association XI v Australians ===
27–28 September 2008
Scorecard

Australians	v	Rajasthan Cricket Association XI
218 (77.1 overs); Simon Katich 73 (105); Gajendra Singh 5/58 (22.1 overs)		122 (52.2 overs); Robin Bist 34 (92); Doug Bollinger 3/9 (9.2 overs)

Match drawn
Sawai Mansingh Stadium, Jaipur
Umpires: Kamlesh Sharma and Vijendra Yadav

- Australians won the toss and elected to bat.
- Rajasthan Cricket Association XI played with 13 players (11 to bat and field) and Australians with 15 (11 to bat and field).

=== Four-day: Indian Board President's XI v Australians ===
2–4 October 2008
Scorecard

Indian Board President's XI	v	Australians
455 (108.4 overs); Rohit Sharma 105 (144); Mitchell Johnson 4/75 (23.4 overs)		314 (120.3 overs); Michael Hussey 126* (302); Piyush Chawla 5/89 (40 overs)
292/4d (70 overs); Yuvraj Singh 113 (143); Stuart Clark 3/33 (13 overs)		127/2 (38 overs); Ricky Ponting 58* (97); Manpreet Gony 1/20 (4 overs)

Match drawn
Rajiv Gandhi International Cricket Stadium, Hyderabad
Umpires: Amiesh Saheba and Shavir Tarapore

- Indian Board President's XI won the toss and elected to bat.

== Test series ==
=== 1st Test ===
9–13 October
Scorecard

Australia	v	India
430 (149.5 overs); Michael Hussey 146 (276); Zaheer Khan 5/91 (29.5 overs)		360 (119 overs); Zaheer Khan 57* (121); Mitchell Johnson 4/70 (27 overs)
228/6d (73 overs); Shane Watson 41 (72); Ishant Sharma 3/40 (14 overs)		177/4 (73 overs); Sachin Tendulkar 49 (126); Stuart Clark 1/12 (11 overs)

Match Drawn
M. Chinnaswamy Stadium, Bangalore
Umpires: Asad Rauf (Pak) and Rudi Koertzen (SA)
Player of the match: Zaheer Khan (Ind)

- Rain delays on days 2 & 3, bad light on day 5
- Cameron White (Aus) made his Test debut.

Australia batted first and centuries from Ricky Ponting and Michael Hussey makes them put a score of 430 Indian pacer Zaheer Khan took five wickets. India reply with 360 with half centuries from Zaheer Khan and Harbhajan Singh . Australia declared their second innings at 228/6 setting up India a target of 299 in the final day of play and India batsmen played carefully to end the match to draw.

Zaheer Khan was awarded Man Of the Match for his all-round performance in the match.

=== 2nd Test ===
17–21 October
Scorecard

India	v	Australia
469 (129 overs); Sourav Ganguly 102 (225); Mitchell Johnson 3/85 (27 overs)		268 (101.4 overs); Shane Watson 78 (156); Amit Mishra 5/71 (26.4 overs)
314/3d (65 overs); Gautam Gambhir 104 (138); Mahendra Singh Dhoni 68* (84); Cameron White 1/48 (8 overs)		195 (64.4 overs); Michael Clarke 69 (152); Harbhajan Singh 3/36 (20 overs)

India won by 320 runs
Punjab Cricket Association Stadium, Mohali
Umpires: Asad Rauf (Pak) and Rudi Koertzen (SA)
Player of the match: Mahendra Singh Dhoni (Ind)

- Amit Mishra (Ind) and Peter Siddle (Aus) both made their Test debuts.

Prior to the Second Test starting on 17 October in Mohali, Australian opening batsman Phil Jaques (who did not play in the opening Test) was sent home after failing to overcome a back injury. He was replaced in the squad by Shaun Marsh, who had opened the batting in the recently concluded One Day Internationals against the West Indies and had been the leading run-scorer in the 2008 Indian Premier League. Victorian fast-bowler Peter Siddle made his international debut, after Stuart Clark injured his elbow. Heavy rains interrupted pitch preparations for the Test, and curator Daljit Singh said, "Heavy rains came down as recently as 4 October and water, two and a half feet deep, collected on the surface which initially affected our ground preparations." The tourists had never played a Test at the venue; however, Indian batsmen Laxman, Sehwag, Dravid, Ganguly and Tendulkar all averaged over 50 at the Punjab Cricket Association Stadium.

Winning the toss and batting, India reached 5/311 by stumps on the opening day, and despite the rain, the pitch was flat with "hardly any swing or movement", enabling the batsmen to hit through the line of the ball. During the day, Sachin Tendulkar became Test cricket's highest run-scorer when he steered a Siddle delivery down to third-man for three. He overtook former West Indian batsman Brian Lara's previous record of 11,953 runs. However, Australia struggled and managed 268 only after the last three wickets put on more than 100. India dominated for the rest of this match and Australia could barely keep up in this record-setting match.

=== 3rd Test ===
29 October – 2 November
Scorecard

India	v	Australia
613/7 dec (171 overs); Gautam Gambhir 206 (380); Mitchell Johnson 3/142 (32 overs)		577 (179.3 overs); Michael Clarke 112 (253); Virender Sehwag 5/104 (40 overs)
208/5 dec (77.3 overs); V. V. S. Laxman 59* (130); Brett Lee 2/48 (17 overs)		31/0 (8 overs); Matthew Hayden 16* (29); Amit Mishra 0/2 (2 overs)

Match Drawn
Feroz Shah Kotla, Delhi
Umpires: Aleem Dar (Pak) and Billy Bowden (NZ)
Player of the match: VVS Laxman (Ind)

- Anil Kumble (Ind) played his final test match.

India batted for almost two days to set themselves up in a dominant position. However the Australians were able to bat for another two days and save the test. The Indians declared late on the final day to give the retiring Anil Kumble a few final overs.

=== 4th Test ===
6–10 November
Scorecard

India	v	Australia
441 (124.5 overs); Sachin Tendulkar 109 (188); Jason Krejza 8/215 (43.5 overs)		355 (134.4 overs); Simon Katich 102 (189); Harbhajan Singh 3/94 (37 overs)
295 (82.4 overs); Virender Sehwag 92 (107); Shane Watson 4/42 (15.4 overs)		209 (50.2 overs); Matthew Hayden 77 (93); Harbhajan Singh 4/64 (18.2 overs)

India won by 172 runs
Vidarbha Cricket Association Stadium, Nagpur
Umpires: Aleem Dar (Pak) and Billy Bowden (NZ)
Player of the match: Jason Krejza (Aus)

- Jason Krejza (Aus) and Murali Vijay (Ind) both made their Test debuts.
- VVS Laxman (Ind) played in his 100th Test.
- Sourav Ganguly (Ind) played his final Test.

This game see-sawed throughout and going into the final day Australia were chasing a large target for victory, however in spite of some good early batting from Matthew Hayden amongst others, the target and the fifth day pitch proved too much for the Australians. The match also saw some unusual (and controversial) tactics on the fourth day by the Australians. Following the Tea Break, they were in a dominant position, however they were a long way behind on their over rate. So to prevent a one match suspension to captain Ricky Ponting, they chose to bowl their part-time bowlers such as Michael Clarke and Mike Hussey (who were both unsuccessful in capturing a wicket), to make it up. This drew strong criticism from many commentators, who suggested that their faster bowlers could have bowled from a shorter run-up. This was also the last test match for Sourav Ganguly.

- Man of the Series – Ishant Sharma – equal top-wicket taker (with Harbhajan Singh) 15 wickets
