= November 2008 in sports =

<<	November 2008					>>
Su	Mo	Tu	We	Th	Fr	Sa
						1
2	3	4	5	6	7	8
9	10	11	12	13	14	15
16	17	18	19	20	21	22
23	24	25	26	27	28	29
30
Sports

This list shows notable sports-related deaths, events, and notable outcomes that occurred in November of 2008.

== Deaths ==
- 4: Lennart Bergelin
- 9: Preacher Roe
- 11: Herb Score
- 17: Pete Newell

== Current sporting seasons ==
=== American football 2008 ===
- NFL
- NCAA Division I FBS

=== Auto racing 2008 ===
- World Rally Championship
- V8 Supercar
- A1 Grand Prix
- GP2 Asia Series

=== Basketball 2008–09 ===
- NBA
- Euroleague
- NCAA men
- NCAA women
- Philippines
  - Philippine Cup

=== Football (soccer) ===
- 2007–08
  - Ecuador
- 2008
  - Brazil
  - Japan
- 2008–09
  - England
  - Germany
  - Italy
  - Spain
  - France
  - Argentina
  - UEFA (Europe) Champions League
  - UEFA Cup
  - 2010 FIFA World Cup qualification

=== Golf 2009 ===
- European Tour

=== Ice hockey 2008–09 ===
- National Hockey League
- Champions Hockey League
- Kontinental Hockey League

=== Rugby union 2008–09 ===
- Heineken Cup
- English Premiership
- Celtic League
- Top 14

=== Winter sports ===
- Alpine Skiing World Cup
- Bobsleigh World Cup
- Cross-Country Skiing World Cup
- Grand Prix of Figure Skating
- Luge World Cup
- Nordic Combined World Cup
- Short Track Speed Skating World Cup
- Skeleton World Cup
- Ski Jumping World Cup
- Snowboarding World Cup
- Speed Skating World Cup

== Days of the month ==
=== 24 ===
==== American football ====
- National Football League Week 13:
  - Baltimore Ravens 34, Cincinnati Bengals 3
  - Carolina Panthers 35, Green Bay Packers 31
  - Indianapolis Colts 10, Cleveland Browns 6
    - The Colts win keeps them in contention for the AFC South Division title.
  - Miami Dolphins 16, St. Louis Rams 12
  - Tampa Bay Buccaneers 23, New Orleans Saints 20
  - New York Giants 27, Washington Redskins 7
    - The Giants improve to 11–1, and need one more win or a Dallas loss to clinch the NFC East Division title.
  - San Francisco 49ers 10, Buffalo Bills 3
    - The 49ers become the first west coast team this season to win in an east coast hosted contest, and stay in contention for the NFC West Division title.
  - Atlanta Falcons 22, San Diego Chargers 16
  - Denver Broncos 34, New York Jets 17
  - Kansas City Chiefs 20, Oakland Raiders 13
  - Pittsburgh Steelers 33, New England Patriots 10
  - Minnesota Vikings 34, Chicago Bears 14
- NCAA BCS Ranking:
  - As a result of the new ranking, Oklahoma, who climbs to second place at the expense of Texas, who drop to third, will represent the Big 12 South Division in the Conference Championship Game against Missouri on Saturday in Kansas City. The Sooners are tied with the Longhorns and Texas Tech in the Division standing, and according to the Conference tiebreaker rules the BCS ranking determines the Division winner. The other places in the top ten are unchanged: Alabama, that finished the regular season with perfect 12–0 record remains on top, Florida, who will play against the Crimson Tide in the SEC Championship Game stays in fourth place, and Southern California, that need a win over UCLA to clinch the Pac-10 Championship round out the top five. They are followed by Utah, Texas Tech, Penn State, Boise State and Ohio State.

==== Cricket ====
- New Zealand in Australia:
  - 2nd Test in Adelaide, day 3:
    - New Zealand 270 & 35/0; Australia 535. New Zealand trail by 230 runs with all 10 wickets remaining in the 2nd innings.
- Sri Lanka in Zimbabwe:
  - 5th ODI in Harare:
    - Sri Lanka 152 (48.5 overs) def. Zimbabwe 133 (44 overs) by 19 runs. **Sri Lanka sweep the series 5–0**

==== Football (soccer) ====
- U-20 Women's World Cup in Chile:
  - Quarterfinals:
    - Nigeria 2–3 **France**
      - Nora Coton-Pélagie scores the winning goal for France with 2 minutes remaining.
    - **United States** 3–0 England
      - Two goals by Sydney Leroux lift USA to the semifinal for the fourth time in a row.

==== Golf ====
- European Tour:
  - Australian Masters at Huntingdale Golf Club, South Oakleigh, Victoria, Australia:
    - Winner: (Australia) Rod Pampling 276 (−12)^{PO}
- Unofficial events:
  - Mission Hills World Cup at Mission Hills Golf Club, Shenzhen, China:
    - (1) Sweden (Robert Karlsson & Henrik Stenson) (2) Spain (Miguel Ángel Jiménez & Pablo Larrazábal) (3) Australia (Richard Green & Brendan Jones) & Japan (Ryuji Imada & Toru Taniguchi)
  - Lexus Cup in Singapore:
    - International team 12½–11½ Asia
  - LG Skins Game in Indian Wells, California:
    - K. J. Choi (South Korea) wins six skins and $415,000 to claim the title.

==== Winter sports ====
===== Alpine skiing =====
- Men's World Cup in Lake Louise, Canada:
  - Super giant slalom: (1) Hermann Maier (Austria) 1min 29.84sec, (2) John Kucera (Canada) 1:30.43, (3) Didier Cuche (Switzerland) 1:30.52,
- Women's World Cup in Aspen, United States:
  - Slalom: (1) Šárka Záhrobská (Czech Republic) 1:39.32 (2) Nicole Hosp (Austria) 1:39.55 (3) Tanja Poutiainen (Finland) 1:40.29

===== Bobsleigh =====
- World Cup in Winterberg, Germany:
  - Four-man: (1) Germany 1:49.30 (2) Russia 1:49.63 (3) United States 1:49.82

===== Cross-country skiing =====
- World Cup in Kuusamo, Finland
  - Men 15 km classic: (1) Martin Johnsrud Sundby (Norway) 37:52.5, (2) Lukáš Bauer (Czech Republic) at 3.5 secs, (3) Sami Jauhojärvi (Finland) 14.1,
  - Women 10 km classic: (1) Aino-Kaisa Saarinen (Finland) 28:16.4, (2) Virpi Kuitunen (Finland) at 3.8secs, (3) Marit Bjørgen (Norway) 7.3,

===== Figure skating =====
- Grand Prix:
  - NHK Trophy in Tokyo, Japan:
    - Men: (1) Nobunari Oda (Japan) 236.18 (2) Johnny Weir (United States) 224.42 (3) Yannick Ponsero (France) 217.24
      - **Grand Prix Final qualifiers: (1) Patrick Chan (Canada) (2). Takahiko Kozuka (Japan) (3) Johnny Weir (United States) 4. Brian Joubert (France) 5. Jeremy Abbott (United States) 6. Tomáš Verner (Czech Republic)**

===== Luge =====
- World Cup in Innsbruck–Igls, Austria:
  - Men's: (1) Andi Langenhan (Germany) (2) David Möller (Germany) (3) Armin Zöggeler (Italy)
  - Women's: (1) Tatjana Hüfner (Germany) (2) Natalie Geisenberger (Germany) (3) Anke Wischnewski (Germany)

===== Nordic combined =====
- World Cup in Kuusamo, Finland:
  (place after jump in parentheses)
  - 10 km Gundersen: (1) Anssi Koivuranta (Finland) 27:33.2 (3rd), (2) Janne Ryynänen (Finland) at 48.6 secs (2nd), (3) Daito Takahashi (Japan) 1:01.3 (1st)

===== Short track speed skating =====
- World Cup 3 in Beijing, China:
  - Ladies' 500m (2): (1) Liu Qiuhong (China) 43.590 (2) Fu Tian Yu (China) 43.617 (3) Zhao Nannan (China) 43.749
  - Men's 500m (2): (1) Olivier Jean (Canada) 41.482 (2) Sung Si-Bak (South Korea) 41.673 (3) Sui Bao Ku (China) 41.727
  - Ladies' 1000m: (1) Wang Meng (China) 1:30.028 (2) Zhou Yang (China) 1:30.117 (3) Shin Sae-Bom (South Korea) 1:30.389
  - Men's 1000m: (1) Lee Ho-Suk (South Korea) 1:29.710 (2) Kwak Yoon-Gy (South Korea) 1:29.785 (3) Charles Hamelin (Canada) 1:30.007
  - Ladies' 3000m relay: (1) China 4:07.804 (2) South Korea 4:08.230 (3) Italy 4:13.666
  - Men's 5000m relay: (1) United States 6:47.432 (2) Canada 6:47.484 (3) China 6:47.676

=== 29 November 2008 (Saturday) ===
==== American college football ====
- NCAA BCS Top 10:
  - The Iron Bowl: (1) Alabama 36, Auburn 0
    - The Crimson Tide's win makes them the fourth Division I FBS team, and the only one from a BCS conference, with a perfect 12–0 regular season. The other perfect teams are Utah, Boise State and Ball State.
  - The Bedlam Series: (3) Oklahoma 61, (12) Oklahoma State 41
    - The Sooners victory, combined with Texas Tech's win over Baylor, keeps them in contention for the Big 12 South Division title.
  - Sunshine Showdown: (4) Florida 45, (20) Florida State 15
    - The win for the SEC Championship Game bound Gators keeps them on the inside track for BCS at-large bid. The Seminoles were also disappointed that Boston College beat Maryland and clinched the ACC Atlantic Division title.
  - (5) Southern California 38, Notre Dame 3
    - The Trojans dominated against the Fighting Irish and now must beat arch rival UCLA next Saturday to secure the Pac-10 title and the Rose Bowl berth.
  - (7) Texas Tech 35, Baylor 28
    - The Red Raiders come back from a 14-points third-quarter deficit to win, but Oklahoma's win will likely leave then in 3rd place in the Big 12 South and out of the BCS bowls.

Top Ten teams whose regular seasons completed: (6) Utah, (8) Penn State, (10) Ohio State. (2) Texas completed their season Thursday, and (9) Boise State finished their season on Friday.

- Notable Rivalry Games:
  - Clean, Old-Fashioned Hate: Georgia Tech 45, (11) Georgia 42
    - The Yellow Jackets come back from 16-points half-time deficit with 26–0 run in the third quarter, but their joy for the win is mixed with disappointment as win for Virginia Tech means the Hokies win the ACC Coastal Division title at the expense of Georgia Tech. The Bulldogs loss ends their hopes for BCS at-large bid.
  - Border Showdown: Kansas 40, (13) Missouri 37 at Kansas City
    - The Jayhawks lead by 16 points early in the third quarter, then allow the Tigers to score 20 consecutive points to take the lead, but Kerry Meier catches a 15-yard pass and scores with 27 seconds remaining to give Kansas the victory over the Big 12 North Division winner. The Tigers will likely drop off the top-14 in the next BCS ranking and be out of contention for BCS at-large berth if they lose the championship game next Saturday.
  - The Civil War: (23) Oregon 65, (17) Oregon State 38
    - The Beavers, who could have clinched the Pac-10 championship with a win, now should hope for a Southern California loss to UCLA next Saturday to win the title. If the Trojans win, They will make the short trip to Pasadena for the fourth consecutive year.
  - Battle of the Palmetto State: Clemson 31, South Carolina 14.
    - Clemson becomes bowl eligible with the win against their in-state rival.
  - Commonwealth Cup: Virginia Tech 17, Virginia 14
    - The Hokies win gives them the ACC Coastal Division title and a trip to the Championship Game against Boston College.
  - Bayou Bucket Classic: Rice 56, Houston 42.
    - The Owls win is worthless since Tulsa beat Marshall and claims the C-USA West Division championship.
  - Victory Bell: North Carolina 28, Duke 20
- Other notable games:
  - (21) Boston College 28, Maryland 21
    - The Eagles win gives them the ACC Atlantic Division title and a spot in the ACC Championship Game against Virginia Tech next Saturday in Tampa.
  - Tulsa 38, Marshall 35
    - The Golden Hurricane's win combined with Rice's victory over Houston gives them home field for the C-USA Championship Game against East Carolina next week.
- News off the field:
  - Sylvester Croom, the first African-American head coach in the SEC, resigned at Mississippi State.

==== Cricket ====
- New Zealand in Australia:
  - 2nd Test in Adelaide, day 2:
    - New Zealand 270; Australia 241/3. Australia trail by 29 runs with 7 wickets remaining in the 1st innings.

==== Rugby union ====
- End of year tests:
  - England 6–32 New Zealand in London
    - The All Blacks complete a 5–0 perfect record in the autumn tests, and also complete their third successful Grand Slam tour, defeating all of the Home Nations.
  - Wales 21–18 Australia in Cardiff
    - The Wallabies lose their first match in the European tour, while Wales score its first win after losses to South Africa and New Zealand.
  - As a result of England's loss and Wales' narrow win, Argentina held on to 4th place in the IRB World Rankings, placing the Pumas in the top seeding pot at the draw for 2011 World Cup, alongside New Zealand, South Africa and Australia. England, Wales, France and Ireland will be in the second pot, Scotland, Italy, Fiji and Tonga in the third pot.
- Sevens World Series:
  - Dubai Sevens in Dubai:
    - Cup Final: England 12–19 South Africa

==== Winter sports ====
===== Alpine skiing =====
- Men's World Cup in Lake Louise, Canada:
  - Downhill: (1) Peter Fill (Italy) (2) Carlo Janka (Switzerland) (3) Hans Olsson (Sweden)
- Women's World Cup in Aspen, United States:
  - Giant slalom: (1) Tessa Worley (France) (2) Tanja Poutiainen (Finland) (3) Elisabeth Görgl (Austria)

===== Bobsleigh =====
- World Cup in Winterberg, Germany:
  - Two-man: (1) Beat Hefti/Thomas Lamparter (Switzerland) 1:51.79 (2) André Lange / Kevin Kuske (Germany) 1:51.96 (3) Thomas Florschuetz / Marc Kuhne (Germany) 1:52.09
  - Two-woman: (1) Helen Upperton / Jennifer Ciochetti (Canada) 1:55.86 Sandra Kiriasis / Romy Logsch (Germany) 1:56.11 (3) Cathleen Martini / Janine Tischer (Germany) 1:56.39

===== Cross-country skiing =====
- World Cup in Kuusamo, Finland:
  - Men's sprint classic: (1) Ola Vigen Hattestad (Norway) , (2) Tor Arne Hetland (Norway) , (3) John Kristian Dahl (Norway)
  - Women's sprint classic: (1) Petra Majdič (Slovenia) , (2) Lina Andersson (Sweden) , (3) Justyna Kowalczyk (Poland)

===== Figure skating =====
- Grand Prix:
  - NHK Trophy in Tokyo, Japan:
    (skaters in **bold** qualify to Grand Prix Final)
    - Ladies: (1) **Mao Asada** (Japan) 191.13 (2) Akiko Suzuki (Japan) 167.64 (3) **Yukari Nakano** (Japan) 166.87
      - **Final standing: (1) Kim Yuna (South Korea) (2) Joannie Rochette (Canada) (3) Asada (Japan) 4 Carolina Kostner (Italy) 5 Nakano (Japan) 6 Miki Ando (Japan)**
    - Pairs: (1) **Pang Qing / Tong Jian** (China) 186.06 (2) Rena Inoue / John Baldwin (United States) 161.49 (3) Jessica Dubé / Bryce Davison (Canada) 156.76
      - **Final standing: (1) Aliona Savchenko / Robin Szolkowy (Germany) (2) Zhang Dan / Zhang Hao (China) (3) Yuko Kawaguchi / Alexander Smirnov (Russia) 4 Pang / Tong (China) 5 Tatiana Volosozhar / Stanislav Morozov (Ukraine) 6 Maria Mukhortova / Maxim Trankov (Russia)**
    - Ice dancing: (1) **Federica Faiella / Massimo Scali** (Italy) 176.67 (2) Nathalie Péchalat / Fabian Bourzat (France) 175.42 (3) Emily Samuelson / Evan Bates (United States) 161.45
      - **Final standing: (1) Isabelle Delobel / Olivier Schoenfelder (France) (2) Oksana Domnina / Maxim Shabalin (Russia) (3) Faiella / Scali (Italy) 4 Jana Khokhlova / Sergei Novitski (Russia) 5 Meryl Davis / Charlie White (United States) 6 Tanith Belbin / Benjamin Agosto (United States)**

===== Luge =====
- World Cup in Innsbruck–Igls, Austria:
  - Doubles: (1) Gerhard Plankensteiner / Oswald Haselrieder (Italy) (2) Andreas Linger / Wolfgang Linger (Austria) (3) Markus Schiegl / Tobias Schiegl (Austria)

===== Nordic combined =====
- World Cup in Kuusamo, Finland:
  - 10 km Gundersen: (1) Ronny Ackermann (Germany) (2) Janne Ryynänen (Finland) (3) Anssi Koivuranta (Finland)

===== Short track speed skating =====
- World Cup 3 in Beijing, China:
  - Ladies' 500m (1): (1) Wang Meng (China) 42.609 WR (2) Liu Qiuhong (China) 43.042 (3) Tatiana Borodulina (Australia) 43.595
  - Men's 500m (1): (1) Charles Hamelin (Canada) 41.118 (2) François-Louis Tremblay (Canada) 41.273 (3) Wang Hong Yang (China) 42.176
  - Ladies' 1500m: (1) Jung Eun-Ju (South Korea) 2:25.001 (2) Zhou Yang (China) 2:25.280 (3) Allison Baver (United States) 2:26.670
  - Men's 1500m: (1) Sung Si-Bak (South Korea) 2:27.075 (2) Olivier Jean (Canada) 2:27.080 (3) Park Jin-Hwan (South Korea) 2:27.184

===== Ski jumping =====
- World Cup in Kuusamo, Finland:
  - Individual: (1) Simon Amman (Switzerland) (2) Wolfgang Loitzl (Austria) (3) Gregor Schlierenzauer (Austria)

=== 28 November 2008 (Friday) ===
==== American college football ====
- NCAA BCS Top 25:
  All Times US EST (UTC −5)
  - The Battle of the Milk Can: (9) Boise State 61, Fresno State 10
    - The Broncos complete their second 12–0 regular season in three seasons, and keep alive their hopes for a BCS at-large bid. The Broncos win means that #15 Ball State, which also finished its regular season unbeaten, but ranked behind #6 Utah and Boise State, is out of contention for a BCS berth.
  - Backyard Brawl: (25) Pittsburgh 19, West Virginia 15
    - The Mountaineers loss means that Cincinnati wins the Big East title and a trip to their first BCS bowl game.
- Notable rivalry games:
  - The Egg Bowl: Ole Miss 45, Mississippi State 0
    - The Rebels finish 2nd in SEC West Division and 4th in the Conference.
  - The Battle for the Golden Boot: Arkansas 31, LSU 30 (at Little Rock)
    - London Crawford's touchdown catch from Casey Dick on fourth and one with 22 seconds remaining gives the Razorbacks a come-from-behind win over the Bayou Bengals.
  - Nebraska 40, Colorado 31
    - The Cornhuskers secure 2nd place in Big 12 North Division, but only 6th in the Conference.

==== Cricket ====
- Bangladesh in South Africa:
  - 2nd Test in Centurion, day 3:
    - Bangladesh 250 and 131; South Africa 429. **South Africa** win by an innings and 48 runs and **win the 2-match series 2–0**.
- New Zealand in Australia:
  - 2nd Test in Adelaide, day 1:
    - New Zealand 262/6
- Sri Lanka in Zimbabwe:
  - 4th ODI in Harare:
    - Sri Lanka 150/8 (47.3 ov) def. Zimbabwe 146 (46.3 ov) by 2 wickets (with 15 balls remaining). **Sri Lanka lead 5-match series 4–0**.
- England in India:
  - The last two One-day internationals were cancelled and the rest of the tour is in doubt, following the 2008 Mumbai attacks in recent days.

==== Winter sports ====
===== Skeleton =====
- World Cup in Winterberg, Germany:
  - Men: (1) Florian Grassl (Germany) 1:54.13 (2) Aleksandr Tretyakov (Russia) 1:54.16 (3) Martins Dukurs (Latvia) 1:54.42
  - Women: (1) Anja Huber (Germany) 1:57.72 (2) Kerstin Szymkowiak (Germany) 1:57.74 (3) Mellisa Hollingsworth (Canada) 1:58.38

===== Ski jumping =====
- World Cup in Kuusamo, Finland:
  - Teams: (1) Finland (2) Austria (3) Germany

=== 27 November 2008 (Thursday) ===
==== American football ====
- National Football League Thanksgiving Day games:
  - Tennessee Titans 47, Detroit Lions 10
    - The Titans improve their league-best record to 11–1, while the Lions suffer 12th consecutive defeat. Tennessee will secure a playoff berth if the Indianapolis Colts lose at Cleveland on Sunday.
  - Dallas Cowboys 34, Seattle Seahawks 9
    - Tony Romo threw for three touchdowns as the Cowboys win the last Thanksgiving Day game at Texas Stadium before they move to Cowboys Stadium next season.
- Thursday Night Football:
  - Philadelphia Eagles 48, Arizona Cardinals 20
    - Brian Westbrook ties a franchise record with four touchdowns, and the Cardinals still need one more win or a San Francisco loss (possibly at Buffalo on Sunday) to clinch the NFC West division title.
- College football:
  - NCAA BCS Top 10:
    - Lone Star Showdown: (2) Texas 49, Texas A&M 9
      - The Longhorns finish the regular season with 11–1 record and keep their hold on the inside track to the Big 12 Championship against Missouri. The 3-way battle for the Big 12 south title depends now on the results of Oklahoma vs Oklahoma State and Texas Tech vs Baylor on Saturday. Texas will clinch the title if the Red Raiders (the only team that beat them) lose, or if the Sooners and Red Raiders both win, and Texas stays above their rivals in the BCS ranking that will be released on Sunday.
  - In another game:
    - Alabama State 17, Tuskegee 13
      - The Tigers' 26-game winning streak, the longest in NCAA football, ends in Montgomery, Alabama to the 2–8 Hornets.

==== Basketball ====
- Euroleague, week 5:
  - Group A:
    - Maccabi Tel Aviv (Israel) 73–80 (Spain) Unicaja Málaga
      - Málaga spoils Pini Gershon's first game as coach of Maccabi
    - Le Mans (France) 93–98(OT) (Greece) Olympiacos
  - Group B:
    - Žalgiris Kaunas (Lithuania) 60–75 (Spain) Regal FC Barcelona
  - Group C:
    - Union Olimpija Ljubljana (Slovenia) 77–69 (Germany) ALBA Berlin
    - DKV Joventut (Spain) 105–100 (Spain) TAU Cerámica
    - Lottomatica Roma (Italy) 76–67 (Turkey) Fenerbahçe Ülker
  - Group D:
    - AJ Milano (Italy) 77–73 (Greece) Panionios

==== Cricket ====
- Bangladesh in South Africa:
  - 2nd Test in Centurion, day 2
    - Bangladesh 250; South Africa 357/5 (Ashwell Prince 115*, Mark Boucher 102*). South Africa lead by 107 runs with 5 wickets remaining in the 1st innings

==== Football (soccer) ====
- UEFA Cup group stage, matchday 3:
  (teams in **bold** advance to last-32 round, teams with ~~strike~~ are eliminated)
  - Group A:
    - Schalke 04 (Germany) 0–2 (England) **Manchester City**
    - Paris Saint-Germain (France) 2–2 (Spain) Racing Santander
  - Group B:
    - Galatasaray (Turkey) 0–1 (Ukraine) Metalist Kharkiv
    - Olympiacos (Greece) 5–1 (Portugal) Benfica
  - Group C:
    - Partizan (Serbia) 0–1 (Belgium) Standard Liège
    - Sampdoria (Italy) 1–1 (Germany) Stuttgart
  - Group D:
    - NEC Nijmegen (Netherlands) 0–1 (England) Tottenham Hotspur
    - Dinamo Zagreb (Croatia) 0–1 (Russia) Spartak Moscow
  - Group E:
    - Portsmouth (England) 2–2 (Italy) **Milan**
    - Braga (Portugal) 2–3 (Germany) Wolfsburg
  - Group F:
    - Žilina (Slovakia) 0–0 (Czech Republic) Slavia Prague
    - Hamburg (Germany) 0–1 (Netherlands) Ajax
  - Group G:
    - Club Brugge (Belgium) 1–1 (France) **Saint-Étienne**
    - Rosenborg (Norway) 0–4 (Spain) Valencia
  - Group H:
    - **CSKA Moscow** (Russia) 2–1 (Poland) Lech Poznań
    - Deportivo (Spain) 3–0 (Netherlands) ~~Feyenoord~~
- U-20 Women's World Cup in Chile:
  (All times UTC; teams in **bold** advance to the quarterfinals)
  - Group D:
    - **North Korea** 5–1 Mexico
    - Norway 0–3 **Brazil**
      - Defending champion North Korea and bronze winner Brazil easily advance to the quarterfinals.
  - Group C:
    - **Germany** 2–1 Canada
    - **Japan** 3–1 DR Congo

=== 26 November 2008 (Wednesday) ===
==== Basketball ====
- Euroleague, week 5:
  (All times CET)
  - Group A:
    - Cibona Zagreb (Croatia) 82–79(OT) (Italy) Air Avellino
  - Group B:
    - Asseco Prokom Sopot (Poland) 60–67 (Greece) Panathinaikos Athens
    - Montepaschi Siena (Italy) 86–63 (France) SLUC Nancy
  - Group D:
    - Efes Pilsen (Turkey) 81–95 (Spain) Real Madrid
    - Partizan Belgrade (Serbia) 62–63 (Russia) CSKA Moscow
      - CSKA extends its winning streak to 5–0

==== Cricket ====
- Bangladesh in South Africa:
  - 2nd Test in Centurion, day 1:
    - Bangladesh 250; South Africa 20/1. South Africa trail by 230 runs with 9 wickets remaining in the 1st innings.
- England in India:
  - 5th ODI in Cuttack:
    - India 273/4 (43.4 ov) def. England 270/4 (50 ov) by 6 wickets. **India lead 7-match series 5–0**

==== Football (soccer) ====
- UEFA Champions League group stage, matchday 5:
  (teams in **bold** advance to last-16 stage, teams in **bold italic** secure first place, teams in italics go into last-32 stage of UEFA Cup; teams with ~~strike~~ are eliminated from all European competitions)
  - Group A:
    - Bordeaux (France) 1–1 (England) Chelsea
    - ~~CFR Cluj~~ (Romania) 1–3 (Italy) Roma
  - Group B:
    - **Internazionale** (Italy) 0–1 (Greece) Panathinaikos
    - Anorthosis (Cyprus) 2–2 (Germany) Werder Bremen
      - Anorthosis extends its unbeaten home streak in all competitions to 40 matches
  - Group C:
    - Shakhtar Donetsk (Ukraine) 5–0 (Switzerland) ~~Basel~~
      - Jádson scores a hat-trick for Shakhtar and Basel concede 0–5 defeat for the second time in 3 matches.
    - **Sporting CP** (Portugal) 2–5 (Spain) **Barcelona**
  - Group D:
    - **Atlético Madrid** (Spain) 2–1 (Netherlands) PSV Eindhoven
    - **Liverpool** (England) 1–0 (France) Marseille
- U-20 Women's World Cup in Chile:
  - Group B:
    - **United States** 0–2 China
    - Argentina 1–3 **France**
      - China, runner-up in the last two U-20 World Cup, is eliminated despite their win over USA, which stops the Americans' unbeaten streak in group matches at 11.
  - Group A: (teams in **bold** advance to the quarterfinals)
    - **Nigeria** 2–0 Chile
    - **England** 1–1 New Zealand
      - Toni Duggan scores England's equalizing goal 4 minutes into injury time and sends the Young Lionesses to meet USA in the quarterfinal
- Copa Sudamericana final, first leg:
  - Estudiantes (Argentina) 0–1 (Brazil) Internacional

=== 25 November 2008 (Tuesday) ===
==== American football ====
- College football:
  - NCAA BCS Top 25:
    - (15) Ball State 45, Western Michigan 22
      - The Cardinals complete a 12–0 regular season and claim the MAC West division title. Their next game is the MAC Championship Game against Buffalo in Detroit on December 5.
- NFL news:
  - Former Atlanta Falcons quarterback Michael Vick, currently serving a 23-month sentence in federal prison for his dogfighting activities, pleads guilty to related Virginia state charges and receives a three-year suspended sentence. The plea deal will potentially allow him to leave federal prison early and speed a possible return to the NFL.

==== Basketball ====
- U.S. college basketball news:
  - The NCAA announces that Indiana will be placed on three years' probation and lose one scholarship, but will not be barred from postseason play. Former Hoosiers head coach Kelvin Sampson is hit with a 5-year show-cause order, which effectively bars him from college coaching until 2013.

==== Chess ====
- 38th Chess Olympiad in Dresden, Germany:
  - Open: (1) Armenia (2) Israel (3) United States
  - Women: (1) Georgia (2) Ukraine (3) United States

==== Football (soccer) ====
- UEFA Champions League group stage, matchday 5:
  (teams in **bold** advance to last-16 stage, teams in **bold italic** secure first place, teams in italics go into last-32 stage of UEFA Cup; teams with ~~strike~~ are eliminated from all European competitions)
  - Group E:
    - **Villarreal** (Spain) 0–0 (England) **Manchester United**
    - Aalborg BK (Denmark) 2–1 (Scotland) ~~Celtic~~
  - Group F:
    - **Bayern** (Germany) 3–0 (Romania) Steaua
    - Fiorentina (Italy) 1–2 (France) **Lyon**
  - Group G:
    - Fenerbahçe (Turkey) 1–2 (Portugal) **Porto**
    - **Arsenal** (England) 1–0 (Ukraine) Dynamo Kyiv
  - Group H:
    - Zenit St. Petersburg (Russia) 0–0 (Italy) **Juventus**
    - ~~BATE Borisov~~ (Belarus) 0–1 (Spain) **Real Madrid**

=== 24 November 2008 (Monday) ===
==== American football ====
- National Football League Week 12 Monday Night Football:
  - New Orleans Saints 51, Green Bay Packers 29
    - Deuce McAllister broke the Saints' franchise record for most career touchdowns and the Saints tied their franchise high in points scored in a game.

==== Basketball ====
- NBA News:
  - The Washington Wizards sack head coach Eddie Jordan and name Ed Tapscott as interim coach.
- Euroleague news:
  - Maccabi Tel Aviv sack coach Effi Birnbaum and name Pini Gershon as his replacement. Gerson's previous spells at the club (1998–2001 & 2003–2006) were the most successful in its history, in which Maccabi won the European title 3 times and was runner up twice. He is also famed as one of only 2 coaches who won the Israeli championship with a club other than Maccabi (Hapoel Galil Elyon, 1993) in the last 39 years.

==== Cricket ====
- Sri Lanka in Zimbabwe:
  - 3rd ODI in Harare
    - Sri Lanka 171/7 (28/28 ov) def. Zimbabwe 166/7 (28/28 ov) by 5 runs. **Sri Lanka take unassailable 3–0 lead in 5-match series**

=== 23 November 2008 (Sunday) ===
==== American football ====
- National Football League Week 12:
  - Buffalo Bills 54, Kansas City Chiefs 31
    - Trent Edwards passes for two touchdowns and runs for another pair, and the Bills score the most points ever against the Chiefs, who lose their 19th game of the last 20.
  - Chicago Bears 27, St. Louis Rams 3
  - Houston Texans 16, Cleveland Browns 6
    - The Texans end an eight-game road losing streak.
  - Minnesota Vikings 30, Jacksonville Jaguars 12
    - The Vikings capitalize on two early Jaguar turnovers.
  - New England Patriots 48, Miami Dolphins 28
    - Matt Cassel passes to Randy Moss for three TDs as the Pats rally from 21–17 down in the third quarter.
  - New York Jets 34, Tennessee Titans 13
    - Brett Favre passes for two touchdowns, and Leon Washington runs for another two, as the Jets end the Titans' unbeaten streak at ten.
  - Baltimore Ravens 36, Philadelphia Eagles 7
    - Eagles QB Donovan McNabb is benched at halftime, and Ed Reed scores on an NFL-record 108-yard interception return off McNabb's replacement Kevin Kolb.
  - Dallas Cowboys 35, San Francisco 49ers 22
    - Terrell Owens catches seven passes for a season-high 213 yards and a touchdown against the team that drafted him.
  - Tampa Bay Buccaneers 38, Detroit Lions 20
    - The Bucs come back from a 17-point deficit with 35 consecutive points to keep the Lions winless in 11 games.
  - Oakland Raiders 31, Denver Broncos 10
    - The Raiders score their first offensive touchdowns in nearly three games thanks to Darren McFadden.
  - Atlanta Falcons 45, Carolina Panthers 28
    - Michael Turner runs for four scores, including three in the fourth quarter for the Falcons.
  - New York Giants 37, Arizona Cardinals 29
    - Eli Manning passes for three touchdowns as the Giants improve to 10–1, denying the Cards from securing the NFC West division title.
  - Washington Redskins 20, Seattle Seahawks 17
  - Indianapolis Colts 23, San Diego Chargers 20
    - Adam Vinatieri's 51-yard walk-off field goal wins the game for the Colts.
- College football news:
  - Longtime Penn State coach Joe Paterno undergoes hip replacement surgery today. He is expected to resume coaching on December 1 in early preparations for the Rose Bowl.

==== Auto racing ====
- V8 Supercar:
  - Falken Tasmania Challenge in Launceston, Tasmania, Australia:
    - (1) Jamie Whincup 292 (2) Todd Kelly 272 (3) Craig Lowndes 252
  - Standing (one race remaining): (1) Jamie Whincup 3208 (2) Mark Winterbottom 2975 (3) Garth Tander 2788
- A1 Grand Prix:
  - Grand Prix of Nations, Malaysia in Sepang, Malaysia:
    - Sprint Race: (1) (Switzerland) Neel Jani (2) (France) Loïc Duval (3) (New Zealand) Earl Bamber
    - Feature Race: (1) (Republic of Ireland) Adam Carroll (2) (Portugal) Filipe Albuquerque (3) (United States) Marco Andretti

==== Canadian football ====
- 96th Grey Cup at Olympic Stadium, Montreal, Quebec:
  - Calgary Stampeders 22, Montreal Alouettes 14

==== Cricket ====
- New Zealand in Australia:
  - 1st Test in Brisbane, day 4:
    - Australia (214 & 268) def. New Zealand (156 & 177) by 149 runs. **Australia lead 2-match series 1–0.**
- England in India:
  - 4th ODI in Jamshedpur:
    - India 166/4 (22/22 ov) def. England 178/8 (22/22 ov) by 16 runs (D/L method). **India takes unassailable 4–0 lead in 7-match series**

==== Football (Soccer) ====
- MLS Cup 2008 at Carson, California
  - Columbus Crew (Ohio) 3–1 (New York (state)) New York Red Bulls
    - The Crew win their first league championship, becoming the first team since the LA Galaxy in 2002 to win the Supporters Shield (best overall record) and the MLS Cup in the same season. Guillermo Barros Schelotto, who assisted on all three Crew goals, is named the game's MVP.
- U-20 Women's World Cup in Chile:
  (teams in **bold** advance to the quarterfinals)
  - Group C:
    - Germany 1–2 **Japan**
    - Canada 4–0 DR Congo
  - Group D:
    - North Korea 3–2 Norway
    - Mexico 0–5 Brazil

==== Golf ====
- European Tour:
  - UBS Hong Kong Open in Hong Kong, China:
    - Winner: (Taiwan) Lin Wen-tang 265 (−15)^{PO}
- LPGA Tour:
  - LPGA Playoffs at The ADT in West Palm Beach, Florida
    - Jiyai Shin (South Korea) wins the US$1 million first prize by one shot over Karrie Webb (Australia) .

==== Rugby union ====
- The IRB Awards are handed out in London. Major award winners are:
  - IRB International Player of the Year: Shane Williams, Wales
  - IRB Coach of the Year: Graham Henry, New Zealand
  - IRB Team of the Year: New Zealand
  - IRB Hall of Fame inductees:
    - 19th century: 1888 New Zealand Natives and team organiser Joe Warbrick; Melrose Club and Ned Haig (inventors of rugby sevens)
    - 20th century: Jack Kyle (Ireland ), Hugo Porta (Argentina)
    - 21st century: Philippe Sella (France)

==== Tennis ====
- Davis Cup Final, day 3:
  - Argentina 1–3 **Spain** in Mar del Plata, Argentina
    - Fernando Verdasco (Spain) def. José Acasuso (Argentina) 6–3 6–7(3) 4–6 6–3 6–1
    - 5th rubber not played
      - Spain, without world #1 Rafael Nadal, wins the Cup for the 3rd time in 8 years, and first time on the road, as it inflicts first home loss in 10 years to Argentina, that remain winless in 3 finals.

==== Winter sports ====
===== Cross-country skiing =====
- World Cup in Gällivare, Sweden:
  - Men's 4x10km: (1) Norway I 1:30:58.8 (2) Sweden I 1:30:59.0 (3) Germany 1:30:59.8
  - Women's 4x5km: (1) Norway I 51:01.5 (2) Finland 51:01.9 (3) Sweden I 51:44.2

===== Figure skating =====
- ISU Grand Prix:
  - Cup of Russia in Moscow, Russia:
    (skaters in **bold** qualify to Grand Prix Final)
    - Ice dancing: (1) **Jana Khokhlova/Sergei Novitski** (Russia) 187.62 pts (2) **Oksana Domnina/Maxim Shabalin** (Russia) 184.66 (3) **Meryl Davis/Charlie White** (United States) 170.61

===== Speed skating =====
- World Cup 3 in Moscow:
  - 1500 m women: (1) Claudia Pechstein (Germany) 1:55.96 TR (2) Christine Nesbitt (Canada) 1:56.40 (3) Kristina Groves (Canada) 1:56.76
  - 10000 m men: (1) Bob de Jong (Netherlands) 12:59.21 TR (2) Håvard Bøkko (Norway) 13:00.65 (3) Enrico Fabris (Italy) 13:11.98

=== 22 November 2008 (Saturday) ===
==== American college football ====
- NCAA BCS Top 10:
  - (5) Oklahoma 65, (2) Texas Tech 21
    - The Red Raiders' hopes of winning the Big 12 South and a possible BCS bid are shot down by the Sooners' offense.
  - (4) Florida 70, The Citadel 19
  - The Holy War: (7) Utah 48, (14) Brigham Young 24
    - The Utes complete a perfect 12–0 regular season and secure a BCS at-large bid.
  - (8) Penn State 49, (15) Michigan State 18
    - The Nittany Lions win their 800th game in school history, the Big Ten championship and a trip to the Rose Bowl
  - (9) Boise State 41, Nevada 34
    - The Broncos improve their record to 11–0 and clinch the WAC title.
  - (10) Ohio State 42, Michigan 10
    - The Wolverines finish with their worst record in school history at 3–9.

Idle: (1) Alabama, (3) Texas, (6) Southern California.

- Notable rivalry games:
  - The Game: Harvard 10, Yale 0
  - Tennessee 20, Vanderbilt 10
  - The Big Game: California 37, Stanford 16
  - Sweet Sioux Tomahawk: Northwestern 27, Illinois 13
    - The Wildcats retire the trophy with a win after the NCAA declares it as a symbol of Indian savagery.
  - The Old Oaken Bucket: Purdue 62, Indiana 10
    - Retiring Boilermakers coach Joe Tiller goes out a winner in his final game.
- Other games:
  - Ole Miss 31, (18) LSU 13
  - (19) Cincinnati 28, (20) Pittsburgh 21
    - The Bearcats beat the Panthers for the first time ever, and gain the inside track to the Big East title.
  - NC State 41, (22) North Carolina 10
  - Florida State 37, (25) Maryland 3
    - Myron Rolle became a Rhodes Scholar today, and the 'Noles celebrated with an upset of the Terps.
  - Syracuse 24, Notre Dame 23
    - The Irish lose to a team with eight or more losses in a season for the first time in 102 tries (99–0–2 before today). The Orange's winning TD pass is thrown by Cameron Dantley, son of former Irish basketball great Adrian Dantley.
  - Wisconsin 36, Cal Poly SLO 35 (OT)
    - The Badgers survive the D-I FCS team and an upset on the level of Appalachian State-Michigan a year ago.
  - (21) Oregon State 19, Arizona 17
    - The Beavers kick a walk-off field goal to keep their Rose Bowl hopes alive into next week's Civil War against in-state rival Oregon. A win in Corvallis sends the Beavers to Pasadena, as they hold the tiebreaker over Southern California.
  - NCAA Division II Playoff:
    - Abilene Christian 93, West Texas A&M 68
      - The second round playoff game between these two in-state rivals sees the highest combined score by two teams in any NCAA football game since the NCAA began keeping official records in 1937.

==== Basketball ====
- NBA News:
  - The Oklahoma City Thunder sack head coach P.J. Carlesimo and names Scott Brooks as interim head coach.

==== Canadian CIS football ====
- Vanier Cup Final at Hamilton:
  - (1) Laval Rouge-et-Or 44, (3) Western Ontario Mustangs 21
    - The Rouge-et-Or win their fourth Vanier Cup in six years, and become the 12th Canadian university team to finish the season with a perfect record. Laval receiver Julian Feoli-Gudino is named Vanier Cup MVP. Hec Crighton Trophy winner Benoit Groulx becomes only the fourth player to win both the trophy and the Vanier Cup in the same year.

==== Cricket ====
- Bangladesh in South Africa:
  - 1st Test in Bloemfontein, day 4:
    - South Africa 441/9d (122.5 ov) beat Bangladesh 153 (36.4 ov) & 159 (51.5 ov) by an innings and 129 runs. **South Africa lead 2-match series 1–0**
- New Zealand in Australia:
  - 1st Test in Brisbane, day 3:
    - Australia 214 & 268 (Simon Katich 131*); New Zealand 156 & 143/6 (Ross Taylor 67*). New Zealand trail by 184 runs with 4 wickets remaining
- Sri Lanka in Zimbabwe:
  - 2nd ODI in Harare
    - Sri Lanka 68/1 (17.4 ov) beat Zimbabwe 67 (31 ov) by 9 wickets. **Sri Lanka lead 5-match series 2–0**

==== Football (soccer) ====
- U-20 Women's World Cup in Chile:
  (teams in **bold** advance to the quarterfinals)
  - Group A:
    - Nigeria 1–1 England
    - Chile 3–4 New Zealand
  - Group B:
    - **United States** 3–0 Argentina
    - China 0–2 France

==== Rugby league ====
- Rugby League World Cup Final in Brisbane, Australia:
  - Australia 20–34 **New Zealand**
    - New Zealand wins the World Cup for the first time, and stops Australia's winning streak at six.

==== Rugby union ====
- End of year tests:
  - Japan 32–17 United States in Tokyo
    - Japan sweep the 2-match series.
  - Italy 17–25 Pacific Islanders in Reggio Emilia
    - The Islanders score their first win of the tour and their first ever win over a Test team, while Italy remain winless in 3 home autumn Tests.
  - England 6–42 South Africa in London
    - The Springboks score their biggest ever win over England, and complete a sweep of their European tour.
  - Ireland 17–3 Argentina in Dublin
    - Although Ireland win, Ronan O'Gara's missed conversion of Ireland's only try keeps the Pumas in fourth place in the IRB World Rankings, tentatively placing them in the first seeding group for the 2011 Rugby World Cup.
  - Scotland 41–0 Canada in Aberdeen
    - Canada is held scoreless for the second time in their European tour, while Scotland score their first win of the end-of-year tests.
  - Wales 9–29 New Zealand in Cardiff
    - Wales lead 9–6 at half time, but the All Blacks pull away in the second half for a comfortable win that continues their 55 years winning streak over the Welsh.
  - France 13–18 Australia in Paris
    - Frenchman David Skrela misses five penalties and a drop goal, and is also sin-binned five minutes from time, as the Aussies win their 3rd consecutive match in Europe.

==== Tennis ====
- Davis Cup Final, day 2:
  - Argentina 1–2 Spain in Mar del Plata, Argentina
    - Feliciano López/Fernando Verdasco (Spain) def. David Nalbandian/Agustín Calleri (Argentina) 5–7 7–5 7–6(5) 6–3

==== Winter sports ====
===== Cross-country skiing =====
- World Cup in Gällivare, Sweden:
  - Men's 15 km freestyle: (1) Marcus Hellner (Sweden) 32min 35.20sec (2) Pietro Piller Cottrer (Italy) 32:36.60 (3) Petter Northug (Norway) 32:42.10
  - Women's 10 km freestyle: (1) Charlotte Kalla 24:07.8 (2) Marit Bjørgen (Norway) 24:32.2 (3) Aino-Kaisa Saarinen (Finland) 24:39.8
    - A double victory for Sweden on home snow in the World Cup opening day.

===== Figure skating =====
- ISU Grand Prix:
  - Cup of Russia in Moscow, Russia:
    (skaters in **bold** qualify to Grand Prix Final)
    - Men: (1) **Brian Joubert** (France) 230.78 (2) Tomáš Verner (Czech Republic) 222.94 (3) Alban Preaubert (France) 219.08 4. **Jeremy Abbott** (United States) 217.48
    - Ladies: (1) **Carolina Kostner** (Italy) 170.72 (2) Rachael Flatt (United States) 166.06 (3) Fumie Suguri (Japan) 162.04
    - Pairs: (1) **Dan Zhang / Hao Zhang** (China) 177.42 (2) **Yuko Kawaguchi / Alexander Smirnov** (Russia) 169.27 (3) **Tatiana Volosozhar / Stanislav Morozov** (Ukraine) 167.86
    - Ice dancing (standing after original dance): (1) Oksana Domnina / Maxim Shabalin (Russia) 97.41 (2) Jana Khokhlova / Sergei Novitski (Russia) 95.52 (3) Anna Cappelini / Luca Lanotte (Italy) 86.82

===== Snowboarding =====
- World Cup in Stockholm, Sweden:
  - Men's Big Air: (1) Janne Korpi (Finland) (2) Chris Soerman (Sweden) (3) Seppe Smits (Belgium)

===== Speed skating =====
- World Cup 3 in Moscow:
  - 1500 m men: (1) Håvard Bøkko (Norway) 1:45.46 TR (2) Mark Tuitert (Netherlands) 1:45.81 (3) Enrico Fabris (Italy) 1:46.00
  - 5000 m women: (1) Claudia Pechstein (Germany) 6:49.92 TR (2) Martina Sáblíková (Czech Republic) 6:57.18 (3) Stephanie Beckert (Germany) 7:01.72

=== 21 November 2008 (Friday) ===
==== Cricket ====
- Bangladesh in South Africa:
  - 1st Test in Bloemfontein, day 3:
    - South Africa 441/9d; Bangladesh 153 and 67/3 (f/o) (Mushfiqur Rahim 49). Bangladesh trail by 221 runs with 7 wickets remaining.
      - Rain in Bloemfontein means that only 19.2 overs are bowled on the day.
- New Zealand in Australia:
  - 1st Test in Brisbane, day 2:
    - Australia 214 & 131/6 (Simon Katich 67*); New Zealand 156 (Ross Taylor 40). Australia lead by 189 runs with 4 wickets remaining in the 2nd innings.

==== Tennis ====
- Davis Cup Final, day 1:
  - Argentina 1–1 Spain in Mar del Plata, Argentina
    - David Nalbandian (Argentina) def. David Ferrer (Spain) 6–3 6–2 6–3
    - Feliciano López (Spain) def. Juan Martín del Potro (Argentina) 4–6 7–6(2) 7–6(4) 6–3

=== 20 November 2008 (Thursday) ===
==== American football ====
- National Football League Week 12 Thursday Night Football:
  - Pittsburgh Steelers 27, Cincinnati Bengals 10
- NCAA BCS Top 25:
  - Georgia Tech 41, (23) Miami (FL) 23

==== Cricket ====
- Bangladesh in South Africa:
  - 1st Test in Bloemfontein, day 2:
    - South Africa 441/9d (Graeme Smith 157, Hashim Amla 112); Bangladesh 153 and 20/1 (f/o). Bangladesh trail by 268 runs with 9 wickets remaining.
- New Zealand in Australia:
  - 1st Test in Brisbane, day 1:
    - Australia 214 (Michael Clarke 98); New Zealand 7/0. New Zealand trail by 207 runs with 10 wickets remaining in the 1st innings.
- England in India:
  - 3rd ODI in Kanpur:
    - India 198/5 (40/40 ov) def. England 240 (48.4/49 ov) by 16 runs (D/L method). **India lead 7-match series 3–0**
- Sri Lanka in Zimbabwe:
  - 1st ODI in Harare:
    - Sri Lanka 130/4 (33.2 ov) def. Zimbabwe 127 (31 ov) by 6 wickets (with 100 balls remaining). **Sri Lanka lead 5-match series 1–0**

==== Football (soccer) ====
- U-20 Women's World Cup in Chile:
  - Group C:
    - Canada 0–2 Japan
    - DR Congo 0–5 Germany
  - Group D:
    - Mexico 1–2 Norway
    - Brazil 3–2 North Korea
- Copa Sudamericana semifinal, second leg:
  (first leg score in parentheses)
  - **Estudiantes** (Argentina) 1(1)–0(1) (Argentina) Argentinos Juniors

=== 19 November 2008 (Wednesday) ===
==== American football ====
- College football: NCAA BCS Top 25
  - (17) Ball State 31, Central Michigan 24
    - The Cardinals survive a scare in a snowy Mount Pleasant to extend their unbeaten record to 11–0 and keep their slim BCS hopes alive.
- NFL news:
  - After completing an alcohol treatment program, Dallas Cowboys cornerback Adam Jones is reinstated by the league. He can practice immediately, but will not play until the Cowboys' December 7 game at the Pittsburgh Steelers.

==== Baseball ====
- The Seattle Mariners name Don Wakamatsu, previously bench coach of the Oakland Athletics, as their new manager. Wakamatsu will be the first Asian American ever to manage in Major League Baseball.
- Mike Mussina will retire rather than re-sign with the New York Yankees or any other team. Mussina won 20 games in the 2008 season at the age of 39, becoming the oldest pitcher to have his first 20-plus win season in MLB history.

==== Cricket ====
- Bangladesh in South Africa:
  - 1st Test in Bloemfontein, day 1:
    - South Africa 299/1 (81.0 ov); Graeme Smith 138 not out, Hashim Amla 103 not out

==== Football (soccer) ====
- 2010 FIFA World Cup qualification (UEFA):
  - Group 3: San Marino 0–3 Czech Republic
    - Czech Republic goes to second place on 7 points, ahead of Poland and Slovenia on goals difference. Slovakia lead the group on 9 points.
- 2010 FIFA World Cup qualification (CONCACAF) Third Round, matchday 6:
  (teams in **boldface** advance to fourth round)
  - Group 1:
    - **United States** 2–0 Guatemala
    - **Trinidad and Tobago** 3–0 Cuba
  - Group 2:
    - Jamaica 3–0 Canada
    - **Honduras** 1–0 **Mexico**
      - Despite their loss, Mexico qualify by goals-difference advantage over Jamaica
  - Group 3:
    - Suriname 1–1 Haiti
    - **El Salvador** 1–3 **Costa Rica**
- 2010 FIFA World Cup qualification (AFC) Fourth round, matchday 4:
  - Group A:
    - Bahrain 0–1 Australia
      - Marco Bresciano's goal in injury time extends Australia's record to 3 wins in as many matches.
    - Qatar 0–3 Japan
      - Japan strengthens its hold on second place, with 7 points from 3 matches.
  - Group B:
    - United Arab Emirates 1–1 Iran
    - Saudi Arabia 0–2 South Korea
      - Korea lead the group with 7 points from 3 matches, followed by Iran on 5 points.
- 2010 FIFA World Cup qualification (OFC):
  - **New Zealand** 0–2 Fiji in Lautoka
    - New Zealand had already won the Oceanian Zone qualifying section and will play-off against the side who finish fifth in Asian Zone for a place at 2010 FIFA World Cup.
- Friendly internationals (selected):
  - Greece 1–1 Italy
    - Italy's coach Marcello Lippi ties the longest unbeaten streak of a national team coach at 31 matches.
  - Netherlands 3–1 Sweden
  - Germany 1–2 England
  - France 0–0 Uruguay
  - Scotland 0–1 Argentina
    - Diego Maradona makes a successful debut as coach of Argentina.
  - Spain 3–0 Chile
    - David Villa's 12th international goal of the year helps Spain to extend its winning streak to 8 matches and unbeaten streak to 28 matches. Spain won 15 of 16 matches in 2008, the only exception being a 0–0 draw against Italy in Euro 2008 quarterfinal, which the Spaniards eventually won on penalty shootout
  - Brazil 6–2 Portugal
    - Luís Fabiano scores a hat-trick for Brazil.
  - Northern Ireland 0–2 Hungary
- U-20 Women's World Cup in Chile:
  - Group A:
    - New Zealand 2–3 Nigeria
    - Chile 0–2 England
  - Group B:
    - China 0–0 Argentina
    - France 0–3 United States
- Copa Sudamericana semifinal, second leg:
  (first leg score in parentheses)
  - **Internacional** (Brazil) 4(2)–0(0) (Mexico) Guadalajara

=== 18 November 2008 (Tuesday) ===
==== American football ====
- ESPN and the Bowl Championship Series announce that the network will have an exclusive deal to broadcast the Fiesta, Orange, and Sugar Bowls from 2011 through 2014, plus the BCS Championship Game in 2011 through 2013. The Rose Bowl will continue to be shown on ABC through 2014 under a separate preexisting contract, as will the 2014 BCS Championship Game, which the eponymous stadium will host.

==== Baseball ====
- Dustin Pedroia of the Boston Red Sox wins the 2008 American League Most Valuable Player Award.

=== 17 November 2008 (Monday) ===
==== American football ====
- National Football League Week 11 Monday Night Football:
  - Cleveland Browns 29, Buffalo Bills 27.

==== Baseball ====
- Albert Pujols of the St. Louis Cardinals wins the 2008 National League Most Valuable Player Award.

==== Cricket ====
- England in India:
  - 2nd ODI in Indore:
    - India 292/9 (50 overs) def. England 238 all out (47 overs) by 54 runs. **India lead 7-match series 2–0**

==== Golf ====
- Wendy's 3-Tour Challenge in Lake Las Vegas, Henderson, Nevada:
  - Winners: Fred Funk, Jay Haas, Nick Price (Champions Tour)

=== 16 November 2008 (Sunday) ===
==== Alpine skiing ====
- Men's World Cup:
  - Slalom in Levi, Finland:
    - (1) (France) Jean-Baptiste Grange (2) (United States) Bode Miller (3) (Austria) Mario Matt

==== American football ====
- National Football League Week 11:
  - New York Giants 30, Baltimore Ravens 10
  - Green Bay Packers 37, Chicago Bears 3
  - Denver Broncos 24, Atlanta Falcons 20
  - Carolina Panthers 31, Detroit Lions 22
  - Indianapolis Colts 33, Houston Texans 27
  - Tampa Bay Buccaneers 19, Minnesota Vikings 13
  - New Orleans Saints 30, Kansas City Chiefs 20
  - Miami Dolphins 17, Oakland Raiders 15
  - Cincinnati Bengals 13, Philadelphia Eagles 13 (OT)
    - The Bengals' Shayne Graham misses a field goal with seven seconds left in overtime, and the game ends in the first tie in the NFL since November 10, 2002 (Atlanta Falcons and Pittsburgh Steelers).
  - Arizona Cardinals 26, Seattle Seahawks 20
  - San Francisco 49ers 35, St. Louis Rams 16
  - Pittsburgh Steelers 11, San Diego Chargers 10
    - Jeff Reed kicks a 32-yard field goal with 15 seconds left for the winning margin. In a bizarre ending, Troy Polamalu apparently recovers a fumble for a Steelers touchdown as time runs out, but the score is overturned on review. Game officials and the NFL admitted the call was incorrect the following day.
  - Tennessee Titans 24, Jacksonville Jaguars 14
    - The Titans fall behind 14–3 at the half, but shut out the Jags the rest of the way to stay unbeaten as Kerry Collins throws for three TDs.
  - Dallas Cowboys 14, Washington Redskins 10

==== Auto racing ====
- NASCAR Sprint Cup:
  - Ford 400 at Homestead, Florida
    - (1) (Missouri) Carl Edwards (2) (California) Kevin Harvick (3) (Missouri) Jamie McMurray
      - Final Points Standings: (1) (California) Jimmie Johnson 6,681 points (2) (Missouri) Carl Edwards −66 points (3) (Washington (state)) Greg Biffle −217 points
        - Johnson becomes only the second driver, after Cale Yarborough, to win three consecutive titles in NASCAR's top series.
- World Touring Car Championship:
  - Guia Race at Guia Circuit, Macau
    - Race 1:(1) (Switzerland) Alain Menu (2) (United Kingdom) Andy Priaulx (3) (France) Yvan Muller
    - Race 2:(1) (United Kingdom) Robert Huff (2) (France) Yvan Muller (3) (United Kingdom) Andy Priaulx
      - Final Points Standings: (1) (France) Yvan Muller 114 points (2) (Italy) Gabriele Tarquini 88 points (3) (United Kingdom) Robert Huff 87 points
- Formula 3:
  - Macau Grand Prix at Guia Circuit, Macau
    - (1) (Japan) Keisuke Kunimoto (2) (Italy) Edoardo Mortara (3) (New Zealand) Brendon Hartley

==== Canadian football ====
- CIS Football Semi-Finals:
  (CIS top ten rankings in parentheses)
  - Mitchell Bowl:
    - (3) Western Ontario Mustangs 28, (5) Saint Mary's Huskies 12
      - The Mustangs advance to the Vanier Cup, hoping to avenge a 37–9 drubbing at the hands of Laval in August. It will be Mustangs coach Greg Marshall's first Vanier Cup appearance.
  - Uteck Bowl:
    - (1) Laval Rouge-et-Or 59, (6) Calgary Dinos 10
      - Le Rouge-et-Or advance to their fourth Vanier Cup game in the last six years, after building up a 29–0 lead in the opening quarter and a 49–0 lead in the half. Laval quarterback Benoît Groulx is named Uteck Bowl MVP.

==== Cricket ====
- Pakistan vs West Indies ODI Series:
  - 3rd ODI in Abu Dhabi, United Arab Emirates:
    - Pakistan 273/6 (50 ov) def. West Indies 242 (46.3 ov) by 31 runs. **Pakistan win series 3–0**

==== Football (soccer) ====
- CAF Champions League final, second leg in Garoua, Cameroon:
  - Cotonsport Garoua (Cameroon) 2–2 (Egypt) **Al Ahly**
    - Al-Ahly win 4–2 on aggregate for their sixth title in this competition and punch their ticket to the 2008 FIFA Club World Cup.
- U-17 Women's World Cup:
  (both matches at North Harbour Stadium, North Shore City, New Zealand)
  - Championship:
    - North Korea 2–1 United States (aet)
      - The North Koreans maintain their unbeaten record in FIFA women's youth competition.
  - Third place:
    - England 0–3 Germany

==== Golf ====
- LPGA Tour:
  - Lorena Ochoa Invitational in Guadalajara, Mexico:
    - Angela Stanford (United States) wins her second LPGA title of the year by one shot over Brittany Lang (United States) and Annika Sörenstam (Sweden) .

==== Rugby league ====
- Rugby League World Cup Semi-Final:
  - Australia 52–0 Fiji in Sydney

==== Rugby union ====
- End-of-year Tests:
  - Japan 29–19 United States in Nagoya

==== Tennis ====
- ATP Tour:
  - Tennis Masters Cup in Shanghai, People's Republic of China:
    - Singles final: (Serbia) **Novak Djokovic** def. (Russia) Nikolay Davydenko, 6–1, 7–5
    - Doubles final: (Canada) **Daniel Nestor** / (Serbia) **Nenad Zimonjić** def. (United States) Bob Bryan / (United States) Mike Bryan, 7–6(3), 6–2

=== 15 November 2008 (Saturday) ===
==== Alpine skiing ====
- Women's World Cup:
  - Slalom in Levi, Finland:
    - (1) (United States) Lindsey Vonn (2) (Sweden) Maria Pietila-Holmner (3) (Germany) Maria Riesch

==== American college football ====
- NCAA BCS Top 10:
  - (1) Alabama 32, Mississippi State 7
  - (3) Texas 35, Kansas 7
    - This loss, combined with (12) Missouri's 52–21 win over Iowa State, clinches the Big 12 North title for the Tigers ahead of the Border War.
  - (4) Florida 56, (25) South Carolina 6
  - (6) Southern California 45, Stanford 23
    - Despite exacting revenge on the Cardinal for their historic upset last year, the Trojans remain second in the Pac-10 Conference as Oregon State holds the tiebreaker, having beaten the Men of Troy.
  - (7) Utah 63, San Diego State 14
  - (8) Penn State 34, Indiana 7
  - (9) Boise State 45, Idaho 10
  - (10) Georgia 17, Auburn 13 (The Deep South's Oldest Rivalry)

(2) Texas Tech and (5) Oklahoma are idle.

- In other games:
  - Maryland 17, (16) North Carolina 15
  - Boston College 27, (19) Florida State 17
    - After Seminoles head coach Bobby Bowden suspends five of his wide receivers due to a fracas at the FSU Student Union, the 'Noles are overpowered by the Eagles.
  - (20) LSU 40, Troy 31
    - In a game rescheduled from September 6 due to Hurricane Gustav, the Bayou Bengals spot the Trojans a 31–3 lead, and roar back with 37 straight unanswered points to win in the greatest comeback in Tigers history.
  - Houston 70, (23) Tulsa 30
    - The Cougars blow out the Golden Hurricane and in the process, nearly outscore the men's basketball team, who defeated Western Kentucky, 73–64.
  - North Carolina State 21, (24) Wake Forest 17
  - Northwestern 21, Michigan 14
    - The Wolverines lose their eighth game of the season, a new record.
  - Notre Dame 27, Navy 21
    - With a win next week against Syracuse, the Irish will assure themselves of a bowl berth.
  - Vanderbilt 31, Kentucky 24
    - The Commodores become bowl-eligible for the first time since 1982, the longest current bowl drought among BCS conference teams, after having lost 17 consecutive times (including four this season) when a win would have made them eligible.

==== Auto racing ====
- NASCAR:
  - Carl Edwards wins the Ford 300, but it was Clint Bowyer winning the Nationwide Series drivers' title by 21 points over Edwards. The Joe Gibbs Racing #20 team with a variety of drivers all season long wins the owners' points championship.

==== Canadian football ====
- Canadian Football League Division finals:
  - Eastern Conference:
    - Montreal Alouettes 36, Edmonton Eskimos 16
      - Les Als will now be the home team for next week's 96th Grey Cup...
  - Western Conference:
    - Calgary Stampeders 22, BC Lions 18
      - ...where they'll host the Stamps in the final.

==== Figure skating ====
- ISU Grand Prix:
  - Trophee Eric Bompard in Paris, France:
    (skaters in **bold** qualify to Grand Prix Final)
    - Men: (1) **Patrick Chan** (Canada) 238.09 (2) **Takahiko Kozuka** (Japan) 230.78 (3) Alban Préaubert (France) 222.44
    - Ladies: (1) **Joannie Rochette** (Canada) 180.73 (2) Mao Asada (Japan) 167.59 (3) Caroline Zhang (United States) 156.54
    - Pairs: (1) **Aliona Savchenko / Robin Szolkowy** (Germany) 188.50 (2) Maria Mukhortova / Maxim Trankov (Russia) 170.87 (3) Meagan Duhamel / Craig Buntin (Canada) 166.63
    - Ice dancing: (1) **Isabelle Delobel / Olivier Schoenfelder** (France) 184.81 (2) Federica Faiella / Massimo Scali (Italy) 179.58 (3) Sinead Kerr / John Kerr (United Kingdom) 176.96

==== Football (soccer) ====
- MLS Western Conference Final
  - Real Salt Lake (Utah) 0–1 (New York (state)) New York Red Bulls
    - The Red Bulls face the Columbus Crew in MLS Cup 2008 next Sunday in Carson, California.

==== Mixed Martial Arts ====
- UFC 91 in Las Vegas, Nevada
  - Brock Lesnar, former WWE champion wins the UFC Heavyweight Championship with a second-round TKO of Randy Couture.

==== Rugby league ====
- Rugby League World Cup Semi-Final:
  - New Zealand 32–22 England in Brisbane

==== Rugby union ====
- End-of-year Tests:
  - France 42–17 Pacific Islanders in Montbéliard
  - Italy 14–22 Argentina in Turin
  - England 14–28 Australia in London
  - Scotland 10–14 South Africa in Edinburgh
  - Ireland 3–22 New Zealand in Dublin

=== 14 November 2008 (Friday) ===
==== American college football ====
- NCAA BCS Top 25:
  - (22) Cincinnati 28, Louisville 20

==== Auto racing ====
- NASCAR
  - Craftsman Truck Series:
    - Johnny Benson wins the 2008 series championship by seven points over Ron Hornaday Jr.
  - News:
    - In what it cited as a cost-cutting move, triggered by the Great Recession, NASCAR announced that no testing will be allowed in 2009 at any track that hosts races in any of NASCAR's three national racing series (Sprint Cup, Nationwide Series, Camping World Truck Series).

==== Cricket ====
- Pakistan vs West Indies ODI Series:
  - 2nd ODI in Abu Dhabi, United Arab Emirates:
    - Pakistan 232 (49 ov) def. West Indies 208 (48.5 ov) by 24 runs. **Pakistan lead 3-match series 2–0**
- England in India:
  - 1st ODI in Rajkot:
    - India 387/5 (50 overs) def. England 229 all out (37.4 overs) by 158 runs

==== Ice hockey ====
- NHL News:
  - The Tampa Bay Lightning sack Barry Melrose after 16 games and name Rick Tocchet as interim coach.

==== Rugby union ====
- End-of-year Tests:
  - Wales 34–13 Canada in Cardiff

=== 13 November 2008 (Thursday) ===
==== American football ====
- National Football League Week 11 Thursday Night Football:
  - New York Jets 34, New England Patriots 31 (OT)
    - Jay Feely's 34-yard field goal gives the Jets an overtime victory and first place in the AFC East.
- NCAA:
  - Buffalo 43, Akron 40 (4 OT)
    - A.J. Princepe's game-winning field goal makes the Bulls bowl eligible for the first time in their D-I FBS history in the last game at Rubber Bowl stadium.

==== Baseball ====
- Cliff Lee of the Cleveland Indians wins the 2008 American League Cy Young Award.

==== Basketball ====
- Euroleague, week 4:
  - Group A: Unicaja Málaga (Spain) 77–67 (Croatia) Cibona Zagreb
  - Group A: Olympiacos (Greece) 84–65 (Israel) Maccabi Tel Aviv
  - Group A: Air Avellino (Italy) 78–73 (France) Le Mans
  - Group B: Panathinaikos Athens (Greece) 81–76 (Italy) Montepaschi Siena
  - Group B: Regal FC Barcelona (Spain) 74–62 (Poland) Asseco Prokom Sopot
  - Group C: Fenerbahçe Ülker (Turkey) 89–87 (2OT) (Slovenia) Olimpija Ljubljana
  - Group C: ALBA Berlin (Germany) 74–72 (Spain) DKV Joventut
  - Group D: Panionios (Greece) 72–67 (Serbia) Partizan Belgrade
  - Group D: Real Madrid (Spain) 70–69 (Italy) AJ Milano

Cibona and Siena suffer their 1st loss, leaving CSKA Moscow the only unbeaten team.

==== Football (soccer) ====
- U-17 Women's World Cup semifinals in New Zealand:
  - North Korea 2–1 England
  - Germany 1–2 United States
- MLS Eastern Conference Final
  - Columbus Crew (Ohio) 2–1 (Illinois) Chicago Fire
    - Eddie Gaven's goal in the 55th minute gives the Crew the Eastern Conference Championship and the right to face Red Bull New York in MLS Cup 2008.

==== Golf ====
- The Royal and Ancient Golf Club of St Andrews announces that the United States television rights for The Open Championship have been granted to ESPN, beginning in 2010. All four rounds will air exclusively on the cable television network, marking the first time that a men's grand slam championship will air entirely on a network outside over-the-air television.

=== 12 November 2008 (Wednesday) ===
==== Auto racing ====
- Dale Earnhardt, Inc. and Chip Ganassi Racing will merge for the 2009 NASCAR Sprint Cup Series season. The new team will be named **"Ganassi Earnhardt Racing with Felix Sabates"** and field Chevrolets for Martin Truex Jr. (#1 DEI), Aric Almirola (#8 DEI), Juan Pablo Montoya (Ganassi #42) and a fourth car (Ganassi #41) with a driver TBA.

==== Baseball ====
- 2008 Major League Baseball Manager of the Year winners:
  - National League: Lou Piniella, Chicago Cubs
  - American League: Joe Maddon, Tampa Bay Rays.

==== Basketball ====
- Euroleague, week 4:
  - Group B: SLUC Nancy (France) 69–64 (Lithuania) Žalgiris Kaunas
  - Group C: TAU Cerámica (Spain) 90–93 (Italy) Lottomatica Roma
  - Group D: CSKA Moscow (Russia) 90–68 (Turkey) Efes Pilsen

CSKA improves to 4–0, while TAU lose its unbeaten record.

==== Cricket ====
- Pakistan vs West Indies ODI Series:
  - 1st ODI in Abu Dhabi, United Arab Emirates
    - Pakistan 295/6 (49.5 ov) beat West Indies 294/9 (50 ov) by 4 wickets
- Bangladesh in South Africa:
  - 3rd ODI in East London:
    - Match abandoned without a ball bowled. **South Africa win series 2–0**

==== Football (soccer) ====
- AFC Champions League Final, second leg in Adelaide:
  - Adelaide United (Australia) 0–2 (Japan) **Gamba Osaka**
    - Gamba win 5–0 on aggregate, becoming the second straight Japanese team to win the competition and thereby advancing to the 2008 FIFA Club World Cup. Adelaide United will also go to the Club World Cup, taking up the J.League place as tournament host vacated by Gamba's Champions League victory.

=== 11 November 2008 (Tuesday) ===
==== American college football ====
- NCAA BCS Top 25:
  - (14) Ball State 31, Miami (OH) 16

==== Baseball ====
- Tim Lincecum of the San Francisco Giants wins the 2008 National League Cy Young Award.

==== Poker ====
- 2008 World Series of Poker Main Event Final Table at Las Vegas, Nevada
  - (Denmark) Peter Eastgate at the age of 22 becomes the youngest main event winner in WSoP history by defeating (Russia) Ivan Demidov for the US $9.15 million top prize with **A♦ 5♠** hole cards and completes a wheel straight with the community cards **2♦ 3♥ K♠ 4♣** and **7♠**, besting Demidov's two pair with **2♥ 4♥**.

=== 10 November 2008 (Monday) ===
==== American football ====
- National Football League Week Ten Monday Night Football:
  - Arizona Cardinals 29, San Francisco 49ers 24

==== Baseball ====
- 2008 Major League Baseball Rookie of the Year Award Winners:
  - National League: Geovany Soto, Chicago Cubs
  - American League: Evan Longoria, Tampa Bay Rays

==== Cricket ====
- Australia in India:
  - 4th Test in Nagpur:
    - India 441 (124.5 ov) & 295 (82.4 ov) beat Australia 355 (134.4 ov) & 209 (50.2 ov) by 172 runs. **India win the series 2–0 and retains the Border-Gavaskar Trophy**

==== Golf ====
- European Tour:
  - HSBC Champions in Shanghai, China
    - Sergio García (Spain) birdies the 72nd hole to force a playoff with Oliver Wilson (England) , and defeats the Englishman on the second playoff hole.

==== Rugby league ====
- Rugby League World Cup in Australia:
  - Semi-final qualifier: Fiji 30–14 Ireland in Gold Coast

=== 9 November 2008 (Sunday) ===
==== American football ====
- National Football League Week Ten:
  - Baltimore Ravens 41, Houston Texans 13
    - Game rescheduled from September 14 due to Hurricane Ike.
  - New England Patriots 20, Buffalo Bills 10
  - Minnesota Vikings 28, Green Bay Packers 27
  - Jacksonville Jaguars 38, Detroit Lions 14
  - Atlanta Falcons 34, New Orleans Saints 20
  - New York Jets 47, St. Louis Rams 3
  - Miami Dolphins 21, Seattle Seahawks 19
  - Tennessee Titans 21, Chicago Bears 14
  - Carolina Panthers 17, Oakland Raiders 6
  - Indianapolis Colts 24, Pittsburgh Steelers 20
  - San Diego Chargers 20, Kansas City Chiefs 19
  - New York Giants 36, Philadelphia Eagles 31

Bye Week: Cincinnati Bengals, Dallas Cowboys, Tampa Bay Buccaneers, Washington Redskins. These were the last byes of the season, as Cincinnati's was originally scheduled for Week Eight, but due to rescheduling with Baltimore, was placed here.

==== Auto racing ====
- NASCAR Sprint Cup:
  - Checker O'Reilly Auto Parts 500 at Avondale, Arizona
    - (1) (California) Jimmie Johnson (2) (Nevada) Kurt Busch (3) (Missouri) Jamie McMurray
      - With a 36th-place finish or better (37th by leading a lap, or 39th and lead the most laps), Johnson can win his third straight Sprint Cup Championship next week in Homestead, Florida.

==== Baseball ====
- Nippon Professional Baseball:
  - 2008 Japan Series:
    - Game 7 at Tokyo Dome: Saitama Seibu Lions 3, Yomiuri Giants 2. **Lions win series 4–3.**
      - Series MVP: Takayuki Kishi, starting pitcher, Lions

==== Canadian football ====
- Canadian University Sport conference finals:
  - Dunsmore Cup: (1) Laval Rouge-et-Or 27, (9) Concordia Stingers 17
    - The nation's number one program head to their sixth straight national semifinal bowl game on Laval running back Sébastien Lévesque's second half performance.

==== Cricket ====
- Bangladesh in South Africa:
  - 2nd ODI in Benoni:
    - South Africa 358/4 (50 overs) def. Bangladesh 230 (49.2 overs) by 128 runs. **South Africa lead 3-match series 2–0**

==== Curling ====
- Pacific Championships in Naseby, New Zealand:
  - Men's final: China 8, Japan 5
    - China and Japan qualify to 2009 World Championship
  - Men's bronze medal match: New Zealand 7, South Korea 6

==== Football (soccer) ====
- U-17 Women's World Cup quarterfinals in New Zealand:
  - Japan 2–2 England
    - England win 5–4 in penalty shootout
  - South Korea 2–4 United States

==== Golf ====
- PGA Tour:
  - Children's Miracle Network Classic at the Walt Disney World Resort, Florida
    - Davis Love III (United States) shoots 8-under-par 64 to edge out Tommy Gainey (United States) by one shot. This is Love's 20th PGA Tour win, giving him a lifetime exemption on that tour (and on the Champions Tour once he reaches age 50); the only other players active on the PGA Tour with this status are Tiger Woods (United States) , Phil Mickelson (United States) , and Vijay Singh (Fiji) .
- European Tour:
  - HSBC Champions in Shanghai, China
    - The fourth round of the opening event of the 2009 season is washed out by rain shortly after the leaders start. Play will resume Monday.
- LPGA Tour:
  - Mizuno Classic in Shima, Mie, Japan
    - Jiyai Shin (South Korea) shoots 5-under-par 67 to finish at 201 (−15) to coast to a 6-stroke win, her second of the season.

==== Ice hockey ====
- 2010 Olympics women's qualifying tournament:
  - Group C in Bad Tölz, Germany:
    - Slovakia 3–1 France
    - Germany 1–3 Kazakhstan

Slovakia qualify for the 2010 Olympic Games in Vancouver

- 2010 Olympics women's qualifying tournament:
  - Group D in Shanghai, China:
    - Norway 2–1 (OT) Czech Republic
    - China 2–0 Japan

China qualify for the 2010 Olympic Games in Vancouver

==== Rugby league ====
- Rugby League World Cup in Australia:
  (teams in **bold** advance to the semifinals)
  - Group A: **Australia** 46–6 Papua New Guinea in Townsville
  - 9th Place Playoff: France 10–42 Samoa in Penrith

==== Tennis ====
- WTA Tour:
  - WTA Tour Championships in Doha, Qatar:
    - Singles final: (United States) **Venus Williams** def. (Russia) Vera Zvonareva, 6–7(5), 6–0, 6–2
    - Doubles final: (Zimbabwe) **Cara Black** / (United States) **Liezel Huber** def. (Czech Republic) Květa Peschke / (Australia) Rennae Stubbs, 6–1, 7–5

=== 8 November 2008 (Saturday) ===
==== American college football ====
- NCAA BCS Top 10:
  - (1) Alabama 27, (16) LSU 21 (OT)
    - Nick Saban leads the Crimson Tide to a win in his return to Death Valley, clinching a spot in the SEC Championship Game.
  - (2) Texas Tech 56, (9) Oklahoma State 20
  - Iowa 24, (3) Penn State 23
    - Daniel Murphy's 31-yard field goal with one second left knocks the Nittany Lions from the unbeaten ranks.
  - (4) Florida 42, Vanderbilt 14
    - Tim Tebow throws for three TDs and runs for two more as the Gators book their date with Alabama in the SEC title game.
  - (5) Texas 45, Baylor 21
  - (6) Oklahoma 66, Texas A&M 28
  - (7) Southern California 17, (21) California 3
  - (10) Boise State 49, Utah State 14
- Other games:
  - (11) Ohio State 45, (24) Northwestern 10
  - (19) North Carolina 28, (20) Georgia Tech 7
  - Cincinnati 26, (25) West Virginia 23 (OT)
  - Wyoming 13, Tennessee 7
    - The Vols lose their first game since the forced resignation of head coach Phillip Fulmer, rendering them bowl-ineligible. The Vols are now assured of only their second seven-loss season in history.

==== Auto racing ====
- V8 Supercars:
  - Desert 400 in Manama, Bahrain:
    - (1) (Australia) Jamie Whincup (2) (Australia) Craig Lowndes (3) (Australia) Russell Ingall
  - Standings: (1) Whincup 2916 (2) (Australia) Mark Winterbottom 2729 (3) (Australia) Garth Tander 2624

==== Baseball ====
- Nippon Professional Baseball:
  - 2008 Japan Series:
    - Game 6 at Tokyo Dome: Saitama Seibu Lions 4, Yomiuri Giants 1. **Series tied 3–3.**

==== Boxing ====
- Joe Calzaghe (Wales) comes back from being knocked down in the first round to defeat Roy Jones Jr. (United States) by unanimous decision.

==== Canadian football ====
- Canadian Interuniversity Sport conference finals:
  (CIS top ten in parentheses)
  - 101st Yates Cup: (3) Western Ontario Mustangs 31, Ottawa Gee-Gees 17
    - The defending OUA champions took a 22–7 lead and never looked back.
  - Loney Bowl: (5) Saint Mary's Huskies 29, St. FX X-Men 27
    - X-Men kicker Kyle Chisholm misses the game-tying field goal with three seconds left, though the Huskies do concede the single.
  - 72nd Hardy Cup: (6) Calgary Dinos 44, (8) Simon Fraser Clan 28
    - The Dinos avenge a loss to the Clan earlier in the season. Nevertheless, the Clan become the first team since 2000 to reach the Hardy Cup final after an 0–8 season the previous year.
- Canadian Football League conference semifinals:
  - East Division: Edmonton Eskimos 29, Winnipeg Blue Bombers 21
    - The Eskies, with their first playoff win in Winnipeg since 1976, become the first team since the present crossover rule was implemented in 1996 to win their crossover semifinal game. Furthermore, Eskies QB Ricky Ray continues to be undefeated in the postseason since 2002.
  - West Division: BC Lions 33, Saskatchewan Roughriders 12
    - The defending Grey Cup champions were knocked off at home, thanks to the superior play of Lions QB Buck Pierce.

==== Curling ====
- Pacific Championships in Naseby, New Zealand:
  - Women's final: China 9, South Korea 4
    - China qualify to 2009 World Championship (Korea also qualify as host)
  - Women's bronze medal: Japan (losing semifinalist)

==== Figure skating ====
- ISU Grand Prix:
  - Cup of China in Beijing, China:
    (skaters in **bold** qualify to Grand Prix Final)
    - Ladies:(1) **Kim Yuna** (South Korea) 191.75 (2) Miki Ando (Japan) 170.88 (3) Laura Lepistö (Finland) 159.42
    - Ice dancing: (1) Oksana Domnina / Maxim Shabalin (Russia) 186.77 (2) Tanith Belbin / Benjamin Agosto (United States) 186.41 (3) Jana Khokhlova / Sergei Novitski (Russia) 179.50
    - Men: (1) Jeremy Abbott (United States) 233.44 (2) Stephen Carriere (United States) 217.25 (3) Tomáš Verner (Czech Republic) 205.48

==== Football (soccer) ====
- U-17 Women's World Cup quarterfinals in New Zealand:
  - Denmark 0–4 North Korea
  - Germany 3–1 Canada

==== Ice hockey ====
- 2010 Olympics women's qualifying tournament:
  - Group C in Bad Tölz, Germany:
    - Kazakhstan 0–1 Slovakia
    - France 2–7 Germany

==== Rugby league ====
- Rugby League World Cup in Australia:
  (teams in **bold** advance to the semifinals)
  - Group A: **England** 24–36 **New Zealand** in Newcastle
  - 7th Place Playoff: Scotland 0–48 Tonga in Rockhampton

==== Rugby union ====
- End-of-year Tests:
  - Italy 20–30 Australia in Padua
  - England 39–13 Pacific Islanders in London
  - Wales 15–20 South Africa in Cardiff
  - Ireland 55–0 Canada in Limerick
  - Scotland 6–32 New Zealand in Edinburgh
  - France 12–6 Argentina in Marseille
  - United States 43–9 Uruguay in Sandy, Utah

=== 7 November 2008 (Friday) ===
==== Basketball ====
- NBA:
  - Utah Jazz 104, Oklahoma City Thunder 97
    - With this victory, longtime Jazz head coach Jerry Sloan becomes the first leader in NBA history to win 1,000 games with a single franchise.

==== Cricket ====
- Bangladesh in South Africa:
  - Nov 7: 1st ODI in Potchefstroom
    - South Africa 283/8 (50 overs) def. Bangladesh 222 (44.2 overs) by 61 runs

==== Figure skating ====
- ISU Grand Prix:
  - Cup of China in Beijing, China:
    - Pairs: (1) Zhang Dan / Zhang Hao (China) 182.22 (2) Tatiana Volosozhar / Stanislav Morozov (Ukraine) 175.05 (3) Pang Qing / Tong Jian (China) 171.86

==== Ice hockey ====
- 2010 Olympics women's qualifying tournament:
  - Group D in Shanghai, China:
    - Japan 3–1 Norway
    - Czech Republic 3–4 China

=== 6 November 2008 (Thursday) ===
==== American football ====
- National Football League Week Ten Thursday Night Football:
  - Denver Broncos 34, Cleveland Browns 30
    - In his first NFL start, Brady Quinn throws for two touchdowns, but the Browns can't hold on to the lead.
- NCAA BCS Top 25:
  - (8) Utah 13, (12) TCU 10
    - The Utes keep their unbeaten season and BCS hopes alive with a last-minute touchdown.
  - Virginia Tech 23, (23) Maryland 13

==== Baseball ====
- Nippon Professional Baseball:
  - 2008 Japan Series:
    - Game 5 at Seibu Dome: Yomiuri Giants 7, Saitama Seibu Lions 3. **Giants lead series 3–2.**

==== Basketball ====
- Euroleague, week 3:
  - Group A: Cibona Zagreb (Croatia) 85–76 (Greece) Olympiacos
  - Group A: Maccabi Tel Aviv (Israel) 82–80 (OT) (France) Le Mans
  - Group B: Montepaschi Siena (Italy) 71–61 (Spain) Regal FC Barcelona
  - Group C: DKV Joventut (Spain) 67–70 (Turkey) Fenerbahçe Ülker
  - Group C: Olimpija Ljubljana (Slovenia) 67–78 (Italy) Lottomatica Roma
  - Group D: Real Madrid (Spain) 54–58 (Russia) CSKA Moscow

Cibona, Siena, TAU Ceramica and CSKA lead their respective groups with 3–0 record

==== Football (soccer) ====
- UEFA Cup group stage, matchday 2:
  - Group A: Racing Santander (Spain) 1–1 (Germany) Schalke 04
  - Group A: Manchester City (England) 3–2 (Netherlands) Twente
  - Group B: Benfica (Portugal) 0–2 (Turkey) Galatasaray
  - Group B: Metalist Kharkiv (Ukraine) 0–0 (Germany) Hertha BSC
  - Group C: Stuttgart (Germany) 2–0 (Serbia) Partizan
  - Group C: Standard Liège (Belgium) 1–0 (Spain) Sevilla
  - Group D: Spartak Moscow (Russia) 1–2 (Italy) Udinese
  - Group D: Tottenham Hotspur (England) 4–0 (Croatia) Dinamo Zagreb
  - Group E: Milan (Italy) 1–0 (Portugal) Braga
  - Group E: Wolfsburg (Germany) 5–1 (Netherlands) Heerenveen
  - Group F: Ajax (Netherlands) 1–0 (Slovakia) Žilina
  - Group F: Slavia Prague (Czech Republic) 0–1 (England) Aston Villa
  - Group G: Saint-Étienne (France) 3–0 (Norway) Rosenborg
  - Group G: Valencia (Spain) 1–1 (Denmark) Copenhagen
  - Group H: Feyenoord (Netherlands) 1–3 (Russia) CSKA Moscow
  - Group H: Lech Poznań (Poland) 2–2 (France) Nancy

==== Ice hockey ====
- 2010 Olympics women's qualifying tournament:
  - Group C in Bad Tölz, Germany:
    - Kazakhstan 6–1 France
    - Germany 0–2 Slovakia
  - Group D in Shanghai, China:
    - Japan 3–2 Czech Republic
    - China 5–0 Norway

=== 5 November 2008 (Wednesday) ===
==== American college football ====
- NCAA BCS Top 25:
  - (17) Ball State 45, Northern Illinois 14

==== Baseball ====
- Nippon Professional Baseball:
  - 2008 Japan Series:
    - Game 4 at Seibu Dome: Saitama Seibu Lions 5, Yomiuri Giants 0. **Series tied 2–2.**

==== Basketball ====
- Euroleague, week 3:
  - Group A: Air Avellino (Italy) 72–70 (Spain) Unicaja Málaga
  - Group B: Asseco Prokom Sopot (Poland) 65–60 (Lithuania) Žalgiris
  - Group B: Nancy (France) 70–80 (Greece) Panathinaikos
  - Group C: TAU Cerámica (Spain) 106–65 (Germany) ALBA Berlin
  - Group D: Efes Pilsen (Turkey) 69–78 (Greece) Panionios
  - Group D: Partizan Belgrade (Serbia) 81–76 (Italy) AJ Milano

==== Cricket ====
- Bangladesh in South Africa:
  - Only T20I in Johannesburg:
    - South Africa 118/7 (14.0 overs) def. Bangladesh 109/8 (14.0 overs) by 12 runs (D/L)

==== Football (soccer) ====
- AFC Champions League Final, first leg in Osaka:
  - Gamba Osaka (Japan) 3–0 (Australia) Adelaide United
- UEFA Champions League group stage, matchday 4:
  (teams in **bold** advance to the last-16 round)
  - Group E: Aalborg BK (Denmark) 2–2 (Spain) Villarreal
  - Group E: Celtic (Scotland) 1–1 (England) Manchester United
  - Group F: Fiorentina (Italy) 1–1 (Germany) Bayern
  - Group F: Lyon (France) 2–0 (Romania) Steaua
  - Group G: Arsenal (England) 0–0 (Turkey) Fenerbahçe
  - Group G: Dynamo Kyiv (Ukraine) 1–2 (Portugal) Porto
  - Group H: BATE Borisov (Belarus) 0–2 (Russia) Zenit St. Petersburg
  - Group H: Real Madrid (Spain) 0–2 (Italy) **Juventus**
- U-17 Women's World Cup in New Zealand:
  (teams in **bold** advance to the quarterfinals)
  - Group C: **Japan** 7–2 Paraguay
  - Group C: **United States** 1–1 France
  - Group D: Brazil 2–2 Nigeria
  - Group D: **England** 0–3 **South Korea**

==== Rugby league ====
- Rugby League World Cup in Australia:
  (teams in **bold** advance to the qualifying final)
  - Group B: Scotland 18–16 **Fiji** in Gosford
  - Group C: **Ireland** 34–16 Samoa in Sydney

==== Shooting ====
- 2008 ISSF World Cup Final (rifle and pistol) in Bangkok, Thailand – last day winners:
  - Women's 10 metre air rifle: Wu Liuxi (CHN)
  - Men's 10 metre air rifle: Gagan Narang (IND) (new world record, 703.5)
  - Women's 10 metre air pistol: Ren Jie (CHN)
  - Men's 10 metre air pistol: Oleg Omelchuk (UKR)

=== 4 November 2008 (Tuesday) ===
==== Baseball ====
- Nippon Professional Baseball:
  - 2008 Japan Series:
    - Game 3 at Seibu Dome: Yomiuri Giants 6, Saitama Seibu Lions 4. **Giants lead series 2–1.**

==== Football (soccer) ====
- UEFA Champions League group stage, matchday 4:
  (teams in **bold** advance to the last-16 round)
  - Group A: CFR Cluj (Romania) 1–2 (France) Bordeaux
  - Group A: Roma (Italy) 3–1 (England) Chelsea
  - Group B: Anorthosis (Cyprus) 3–3 (Italy) Internazionale
  - Group B: Werder Bremen (Germany) 0–3 (Greece) Panathinaikos
  - Group C: **Sporting CP** (Portugal) 1–0 (Ukraine) Shakhtar Donetsk
  - Group C: **Barcelona** (Spain) 1–1 (Switzerland) Basel
  - Group D: Liverpool (England) 1–1 (Spain) Atlético Madrid
  - Group D: Marseille (France) 3–0 (Netherlands) PSV Eindhoven
- U-17 Women's World Cup in New Zealand:
  (teams in **bold** advance to the quarterfinals)
  - Group A: New Zealand 3–1 Colombia
  - Group A: **Canada** 0–0 **Denmark**
  - Group B: Ghana 1–0 Costa Rica
  - Group B: **Germany** 1–1 **North Korea**
- Diego Maradona is appointed as the new head coach of the Argentina national football team, and appoints Javier Mascherano as new team captain. (BBC), (CNN)

==== Shooting ====
- 2008 ISSF World Cup Final (rifle and pistol) in Bangkok, Thailand – second day winners:
  - Men's 25 metre rapid fire pistol: Alexey Klimov (RUS)
  - Women's 50 metre rifle three positions: Sonja Pfeilschifter (GER)
  - Men's 50 metre rifle three positions: Matthew Emmons (USA)

=== 3 November 2008 (Monday) ===
==== American football ====
- National Football League Monday Night Football Week Nine:
  - Pittsburgh Steelers 23, Washington Redskins 6
- NCAA News:
  - Tennessee head coach Phillip Fulmer is forced to resign, effective upon the end of the season.

==== Basketball ====
- NBA News:
  - The Denver Nuggets trade guard Allen Iverson to the Detroit Pistons in exchange for guard Chauncey Billups, guard/forward Antonio McDyess and center Cheikh Samb.

==== Shooting ====
- 2008 ISSF World Cup Final (rifle and pistol) in Bangkok, Thailand – first day winners:
  - Men's 50 metre rifle prone: Warren Potent (AUS)
  - Men's 50 metre pistol: Jin Jong-oh (KOR)
  - Women's 25 metre pistol: Munkhbayar Dorjsuren (GER)

=== 2 November 2008 (Sunday) ===
==== American football ====
- National Football League Week Nine:
  - Arizona Cardinals 34, St. Louis Rams 13
  - Baltimore Ravens 37, Cleveland Browns 27
  - Chicago Bears 27, Detroit Lions 23
  - Tennessee Titans 19, Green Bay Packers 16 (OT)
  - Minnesota Vikings 28, Houston Texans 21
  - Cincinnati Bengals 21, Jacksonville Jaguars 19
  - New York Jets 26, Buffalo Bills 17
  - Tampa Bay Buccaneers 30, Kansas City Chiefs 27 (OT)
  - Miami Dolphins 26, Denver Broncos 17
  - Atlanta Falcons 24, Oakland Raiders 0
  - New York Giants 35, Dallas Cowboys 14
  - Philadelphia Eagles 26, Seattle Seahawks 7
  - Indianapolis Colts 18, New England Patriots 15

Bye Week: Carolina Panthers, New Orleans Saints, San Diego Chargers, San Francisco 49ers.

==== Athletics (track and field) ====
- New York City Marathon:
  - Men: (1) (Brazil) Marilson Gomes dos Santos 2:08:43 (2) (Morocco) Abderrahim Goumri (3) (Kenya) Daniel Rono
  - Women: (1) (United Kingdom) Paula Radcliffe 2:23:56 (2) (Russia) Ludmila Petrova (3) (United States) Kara Goucher

==== Auto racing ====
- Formula One:
  - Brazilian Grand Prix in São Paulo:
    - (1) (Brazil) Felipe Massa (2) (Spain) Fernando Alonso (3) (Finland) Kimi Räikkönen
      - (United Kingdom) Lewis Hamilton, who finishes in fifth place, wins the drivers' championship by one point over Massa, and becomes the youngest ever Formula One champion. With two laps remaining, Hamilton is passed by Sebastian Vettel and goes down to 6th place, but in the last corner of the track he overtakes Timo Glock and wins the title.
  - Final standings:
    - Drivers: (1) Hamilton 98 (2) Massa 97 (3) Räikkönen 75
    - Constructors: (1) (Italy) Ferrari 172 (2) (United Kingdom) McLaren–Mercedes 151 (3) (Germany) BMW Sauber 135
- Sprint Cup Series:
  - Dickies 500 at Fort Worth, Texas:
    - (1) (Missouri) Carl Edwards (2) (California) Jeff Gordon (3) (Missouri) Jamie McMurray
- WRC:
  - Rally Japan:
    - (1) (Finland) Mikko Hirvonen (2) (Finland) Jari-Matti Latvala (3) (France) Sébastien Loeb
  - Drivers' standings: (1) Loeb 112 (2) Hirvonen 102 (3) (Spain) Dani Sordo 59
    - Sébastien Loeb secures the World Championship with one race remaining.

==== Baseball ====
- Nippon Professional Baseball:
  - 2008 Japan Series:
    - Game 2 at Tokyo Dome: Yomiuri Giants 3, Saitama Seibu Lions 2. **Series tied 1–1.**

==== Canadian football ====
- CIS football conference semifinals:
  - Canada West:
    - (6) Calgary Dinos 24, Regina Rams 17

==== Cricket ====
- Australia in India:
  - 3rd Test in New Delhi, day 5:
    - India 613/7d (161 ov) & 208/5d (77.3 ov); Australia 577 (179.3 ov) & 31/0 (8 ov) – Match drawn. **India lead 4-match series 1–0.**
- Kenya in South Africa:
  - 2nd ODI in Kimberley
    - South Africa 224/3 (35.3 ov) def. Kenya 222/9 (50 ov) by 7 wickets. **South Africa win series 2–0.**
- ICC Intercontinental Cup Final in Port Elizabeth, South Africa, day 4:
  - Ireland 195 (73.3 ov) & 201/1 (58 ov) def. Namibia 250 (94.3 ov) & 145 (62.3 ov) by 9 wickets

==== Figure skating ====
- ISU Grand Prix:
  - Skate Canada International in Ottawa, Ontario, Canada:
    - Ice dancing: (1) Meryl Davis/Charlie White (United States) 178.89 (2) Vanessa Crone/Paul Poirier (Canada) 162.13 (3) Nathalie Péchalat/Fabian Bourzat (France) 159.06

==== Football (soccer) ====
- CAF Champions League final, first leg in Cairo:
  - Al Ahly (Egypt) 2–0 (Cameroon) Cotonsport Garoua
- U-17 Women's World Cup in New Zealand
  (teams in **bold** advance to the quarter-finals)
  - Group C: Paraguay 1–3 United States
  - Group C: **Japan** 7–1 France
  - Group D: Nigeria 0–1 England
  - Group D: Brazil 1–2 South Korea
- Russian Premier League:
  - Rubin Kazan secures its first ever championship with 3 matches remaining after 2:1 win at Saturn Moscow Oblast.

==== Golf ====
- PGA Tour:
  - Ginn sur Mer Classic in Palm Coast, Florida:
    - Winner: (United States) Ryan Palmer
- European Tour:
  - Volvo Masters at Valderrama Golf Club, Sotogrande, Spain:
    - (Denmark) Søren Kjeldsen shoots even-par 71 to complete a wire-to-wire win, finishing two shots ahead of the field at 276 (−8).
  - Robert Karlsson (Sweden) becomes the first Swede ever to win the Tour's Order of Merit. This is the last year for the Order of Merit, which will be replaced for the 2009 season by the Race to Dubai.
- LPGA Tour:
  - Hana Bank-KOLON Championship:
    - Winner: (Taiwan) (United States) Candie Kung

==== Motorcycle racing ====
- Superbike:
  - Portimão Superbike World Championship round in Portimão, Portugal:
    - Race 1: (1) (Australia) Troy Bayliss (2) (Spain) Carlos Checa (3) (Australia) Troy Corser
    - Race 2: (1) (Australia) Troy Bayliss (2) (Italy) Michel Fabrizio (3) (United Kingdom) Leon Haslam
  - Final standings:
    - Riders' standings: (1) (Australia) Bayliss 460 (2) (Australia) Corser 342 (3) (Japan) Noriyuki Haga 327
    - Manufacturers' standings: (1) (Italy) Ducati 578 (2) (Japan) Yamaha 487 (3) (Japan) Honda 415

==== Rugby league ====
- Rugby League World Cup in Australia:
  - Group A: Australia 52–4 England in Melbourne
    - Australia advance to the semifinals

==== Surfing ====
- ASP World Tour
  - Hang loose Santa Catarina Pro in Florianópolis, Brazil:
    - (1) (Australia) Bede Durbidge (2) (France) Jérémy Florès (3) (France) Micky Picon (3) (United States) Frederick Patachia

==== Tennis ====
- ATP Tour:
  - Paris Masters in Paris, France:
    - Final: (France) **Jo-Wilfried Tsonga** def. (Argentina) David Nalbandian, 6–3, 4–6, 6–4
- WTA Tour:
  - Bell Challenge in Quebec City, Canada:
    - Final: (Russia) **Nadia Petrova** def. (United States) Bethanie Mattek 4–6, 6–4, 6–1

=== 1 November 2008 (Saturday) ===
==== American college football ====
- NCAA BCS Top 10:
  - (7) Texas Tech 39, (1) Texas 33
    - In front of a record crowd in Lubbock, the Longhorns recover from a 19–0 deficit to take a 33–32 lead with 1:29 left, but with one second remaining Graham Harrell throws to Michael Crabtree for the game-winning touchdown.
  - (2) Alabama 35, Arkansas State 0
  - (4) Oklahoma 62, Nebraska 28
  - (5) Southern California 56, Washington 0
  - (8) Florida 49, (6) Georgia 10 at Jacksonville (The World's Largest Outdoor Cocktail Party)
  - (9) Oklahoma State 59, Iowa State 17
  - (10) Utah 13, New Mexico 10

(3) Penn State is idle.

- In other games:
  - Georgia Tech 31, (15) Florida State 28
  - Northwestern 24, (17) Minnesota 17
  - Arkansas 30, (18) Tulsa 23
    - The Golden Hurricane suffer their first loss of the season
  - California 26, (24) Oregon 16
  - West Virginia 35, (25) Connecticut 13
  - Purdue 48, Michigan 42
    - The Wolverines' loss means that their consecutive bowl game appearance streak ends at 33, and also assures the Wolverines (2–7) will have a losing season for the first time since 1967.
  - Following this weekend, the only remaining teams with unbeaten record are Alabama, Penn State, Texas Tech, Utah, Boise State and #16 Ball State.

==== Baseball ====
- Nippon Professional Baseball:
  - 2008 Japan Series:
    - Game 1 at Tokyo Dome: Saitama Seibu Lions 2, Yomiuri Giants 1. **Lions lead series 1–0.**

==== Canadian football ====
- CIS football conference semifinals
  (CIS Top Ten rankings in parentheses):
  - Ontario:
    - (3) Western Mustangs 36, (7) Laurier Golden Hawks 28
    - Ottawa Gee-Gees 23, (2) Queen's Golden Gaels 13
  - Atlantic:
    - St. Francis Xavier X-Men 52, Mount Allison Mounties 12
  - Quebec:
    - (9) Concordia Stingers 41, Sherbrooke Vert-et-Or 20
    - (1) Laval Rouge-et-Or 32, (10) Montreal Carabins 7
  - Canada West:
    - (8) Simon Fraser Clan 40, (4) Saskatchewan Huskies 30

==== Cricket ====
- Australia in India:
  - 3rd Test in New Delhi, day 4:
  - India 613/7d & 43/2; Australia 577. India lead by 79 runs with 8 wickets remaining
- ICC Intercontinental Cup Final in Port Elizabeth, South Africa, day 3:
  - Namibia 250 & 145; Ireland 195 & 134/1. Ireland require another 67 runs with 9 wickets remaining

==== Figure skating ====
- ISU Grand Prix:
  - Skate Canada International in Ottawa, Ontario, Canada:
    - Men: (1) Patrick Chan (Canada) 215.45 (2) Ryan Bradley (United States) 212.75 (3) Evan Lysacek (United States) 209.27
    - Ladies: (1) Joannie Rochette (Canada) 188.89 (2) Fumie Suguri (Japan) 163.86 (3) Alissa Czisny (United States) 157.92
    - Pairs: (1) Yuko Kawaguchi/Alexander Smirnov (Russia) 176.97 (2) Jessica Dubé/Bryce Davison (Canada) 176.54 (3) Keauna McLaughlin/Rockne Brubaker (United States) 161.51

==== Football (soccer) ====
- U-17 Women's World Cup in New Zealand
  (teams in **bold** advance to the quarter-finals)
  - Group A: Colombia 1–1 Canada
  - Group A: New Zealand 1–2 Denmark
  - Group B: Ghana 2–3 **Germany**
  - Group B: Costa Rica 1–2 North Korea

==== Rugby league ====
- Rugby League World Cup in Australia:
  - Group A: New Zealand 48–6 Papua New Guinea in Gold Coast
  - Group B: France 6–42 Fiji in Wollongong

==== Rugby union ====
- End of year rugby tests:
  - New Zealand 19–14 Australia in Hong Kong
  - Portugal 13–21 Canada in Lisbon
