= West Indian cricket team against Pakistan in the UAE in 2008–09 =

Sports event

	Pakistan	West Indies
- Dates: 12 November 2008 – 16 November 2008
Captains	Shoaib Malik	Chris Gayle

One Day International series
- Results: Pakistan won the 3-match series 3–0
Most runs	Younis Khan 191	Chris Gayle 235
Most wickets	Umar Gul 9	Jerome Taylor 7
- Player of the series: Chris Gayle

The Pakistan and West Indies cricket teams played a series of three one day international (ODI) matches in Abu Dhabi, United Arab Emirates, between November 12 and November 16, 2008. The Pakistanis won all three matches.

== Squads ==
ODI series
Pakistan	West Indies
Shoaib Malik [c]	Chris Gayle (c)
Salman Butt	Sewnarine Chattergoon
Khurram Manzoor	Xavier Marshall
Younis Khan	Ramnaresh Sarwan
Misbah-ul-Haq	Shivnarine Chanderpaul
Shahid Afridi	Brendan Nash
Kamran Akmal (wk)	Carlton Baugh (wk)
Fawad Alam	Jerome Taylor
Sohail Tanvir	Nikita Miller
Abdur Rauf	Daren Powell
Umar Gul	Lionel Baker
Iftikhar Anjum	Shawn Findlay
Shoaib Akhtar	Kemar Roach
Nasir Jamshed	Leon Johnson
Saeed Ajmal	Dave Mohammed
Khalid Latif
Sohail Khan
Yasir Arafat

== Matches ==
=== 1st ODI ===
12 November 2008
Scorecard

West Indies; 294/9 (50 overs)	v	Pakistan; 295/6 (49.5 overs)
Chris Gayle 113 (106); Sohail Tanvir 3/42 (10 overs)		Khurram Manzoor 69 (89); Lionel Baker 3/47 (10 overs)

Pakistan won by 4 wickets
Sheikh Zayed Cricket Stadium, Abu Dhabi
Umpires: Mark Benson (Eng) and Steve Davis (Aus)
Player of the match: Chris Gayle (WI)

=== 2nd ODI ===
14 November 2008
Scorecard

Pakistan; 232 (49 overs)	v	West Indies; 208 (48.5 overs)
Misbah-ul-Haq 52 (88); Jerome Taylor 3/38 (9 overs)		Shivnarine Chanderpaul 107 (149); Umar Gul 3/34 (9.5 overs)

Pakistan won by 24 runs
Sheikh Zayed Cricket Stadium, Abu Dhabi
Umpires: Steve Davis (Aus) and Daryl Harper (Aus)
Player of the match: Sohail Tanvir (Pak)

=== 3rd ODI ===
16 November 2008
Scorecard

Pakistan; 273/6 (50 overs)	v	West Indies; 242 (46.3 overs)
Younis Khan 101 (119); Iftikhar Anjum 4/59 (9 overs)		Chris Gayle 122 (137); Jerome Taylor 2/50 (10 overs)

Pakistan won by 31 runs
Sheikh Zayed Cricket Stadium, Abu Dhabi
Umpires: Mark Benson (Eng) and Daryl Harper (Aus)
Player of the match: Younis Khan (Pak)
