= Bangladeshi cricket team in South Africa in 2008–09 =

Bangladesh cricket team in South Africa in 2008-09
	Bangladesh	South Africa
- Dates: 5 November 2008 – 30 November 2008
Captains	Mohammad Ashraful	Graeme Smith

Test series
- Result: South Africa won the 2-match series 2–0
Most runs	Junaid Siddique 118	Ashwell Prince 221
Most wickets	Shakib Al Hasan 11	Makhaya Ntini 11
- Player of the series: Ashwell Prince (SA)

One Day International series
- Results: South Africa won the 3-match series 2–0
Most runs	Mohammad Ashraful 78	Hashim Amla 175
Most wickets	Naeem Islam 4	Dale Steyn 73
- Player of the series: Hashim Amla (SA)

Twenty20 International series
- Results: South Africa won the 1-match series 1–0
Most runs	Tamim Iqbal 25	AB de Villiers 36
Most wickets	Abdur Razzak 4	Johan Botha 2
- Player of the series: Abdur Razzak (Ban)

The Bangladesh cricket team toured South Africa from 5 to 30 November 2008. They played two Test matches, one Twenty20 International and three One Day Internationals against South Africa. South Africa won five of the six matches, while the third ODI was abandoned due to rain.

== T20I series ==
=== Only T20I ===
5 November
Scorecard

South Africa; 118/7 (14 overs)	v	Bangladesh; 109/8 (14 overs)
AB de Villiers 36 (26); Abdur Razzak 4/16 (3 overs)		Tamim Iqbal 25 (24); Johan Botha 2/15 (3 overs)

South Africa won by 12 runs (D/L)
New Wanderers Stadium, Johannesburg
Umpires: Marais Erasmus (SA) and Brian Jerling (SA)
Player of the match: Abdur Razzak (Ban)

- Rain shortened match to 14 overs per side.

== ODI series ==
=== 1st ODI ===
7 November
Scorecard

South Africa; 283/8 (50 overs)	v	Bangladesh; 222 (44.2 overs)
Jacques Kallis 50 (73); Naeem Islam 3/60 (10 overs)		Mohammad Ashraful 73 (78); Dale Steyn 4/16 (8 overs)

South Africa won by 61 runs
Senwes Park, Potchefstroom
Umpires: Nigel Llong (Eng) and Marais Erasmus (SA)
Player of the match: Dale Steyn (SA)

=== 2nd ODI ===
9 November
Scorecard

South Africa; 358/4 (50 overs)	v	Bangladesh; 230 (49.2 overs)
Hashim Amla 140 (135); Mashrafe Mortaza 1/54 (10 overs)		Junaid Siddique 47 (82); Johan Botha 3/27 (10 overs)

South Africa won by 128 runs
Willowmoore Park, Benoni
Umpires: Brian Jerling (SA) and Nigel Llong (Eng)
Player of the match: Hashim Amla (SA)

- Hashim Amla (SA) scored his first century in ODIs.

=== 3rd ODI ===
12 November
Scorecard

Bangladesh	v	South Africa

Match abandoned without a ball bowled
Buffalo Park, East London
Umpires: Marais Erasmus (SA) and Nigel Llong (Eng)

== Test series ==
=== 1st Test ===
19–23 November
Scorecard

South Africa	v	Bangladesh
441 (122.5 overs); Graeme Smith 157 (248); Shakib Al Hasan 5/130 (38 overs)		153 (36.4 overs); Mushfiqur Rahim 48 (63); Makhaya Ntini 3/20 (8 overs)
		159 (51.5 overs) (f/o); Mehrab Hossain jnr 43* (69); Dale Steyn 5/63 (18 overs)

South Africa won by an innings and 129 runs
The OUTsurance Oval, Bloemfontein
Umpires: Steve Davis (Aus) and Ian Gould (Eng)
Player of the match: Graeme Smith (SA)

- Play on Day 3 was called off.

=== 2nd Test ===
26–30 November
Scorecard

Bangladesh	v	South Africa
250 (76.2 overs); Junaid Siddique 67 (144); Makhaya Ntini 4/32 (19.2 overs)		429 (115.2 overs); Ashwell Prince 162* (223); Shakib Al Hasan 6/99 (28 overs)
131 (36.4 overs); Raqibul Hasan 28 (62); Monde Zondeki 2/10 (4.4 overs)

South Africa won by an innings and 48 runs
SuperSport Park, Centurion, South Africa
Umpires: Steve Davis (Aus) and Ian Gould (Eng)
Player of the match: Ashwell Prince (SA)

== Tour matches ==
=== First-class: South African Airways Challenge XI vs Bangladeshis ===
15–16 November
Scorecard

South African Airways Challenge XI (South Africa)	v	Bangladeshis
265 (65.2 overs); Divan van Wyk 87 (141); Shahadat Hossain 3/33 (10 overs)		375 (83.3 overs); Mushfiqur Rahim 89 (124); Mthokozisi Shezi 4/42 (12 overs)
74/2 (19 overs); Divan van Wyk 27 (26); Shahadat Hossain 2/19 (4 overs)

Match drawn
De Beers Diamond Oval, Kimberley
Umpires: Marais Erasmus (SA) and Brian Jerling (SA)

- Players per side 12 (11 batting, 11 fielding)
