= Sri Lankan cricket team in Zimbabwe in 2008–09 =

	Sri Lanka	Zimbabwe
- Dates: 13 November 2008 – 30 November 2008
Captains	Mahela Jayawardene	Prosper Utseya

One Day International series
- Results: Sri Lanka won the 5-match series 5–0
Most runs	Kumar Sangakkara 182; Jehan Mubarak 98; Upul Tharanga 78	Hamilton Masakadza 133; Tatenda Taibu 100; Keith Dabengwa 71
Most wickets	Ajantha Mendis 15; Muttiah Muralitharan 11; Nuwan Kulasekara & Thilan Thushara 6	Tawanda Mupariwa 10; Elton Chigumbura 7 Ray Price 4
- Player of the series: Ajantha Mendis

The Sri Lanka national cricket team toured Zimbabwe in November 2008 to play 5 Limited Overs Internationals.

It was the first international series for new Zimbabwe coach Walter Chawaguta.

== ODI series ==
=== 1st ODI ===
20 November
(scorecard)

Zimbabwe; 127 (31 overs)	v	Sri Lanka; 130/4 (33.2 overs)
Tatenda Taibu 36* (58); Muttiah Muralitharan 4/14 (4 overs)		Kumar Sangakkara 46* (95); Ray Price 2/24 (7 overs)

Sri Lanka won by 6 wickets
Harare Sports Club, Harare, Zimbabwe
Umpires: Aleem Dar (PAK) & Kevan Barbour (ZIM)
Player of the match: Muttiah Muralitharan

=== 2nd ODI ===
22 November
(scorecard)

Zimbabwe; 67 (31 overs)	v	Sri Lanka; 68/1 (17.4 overs)
Tatenda Taibu 12 (38); Extras (lb 1, w 11) 12; Ajantha Mendis 4/15 (6 overs)		Kumar Sangakkara 28 (25); Tawanda Mupariwa 1/18 (6 overs)

Sri Lanka won by 9 wickets
Harare Sports Club, Harare, Zimbabwe
Umpires: Aleem Dar (PAK) & Kevan Barbour (ZIM)
Player of the match: Ajantha Mendis

=== 3rd ODI ===
24 November
(scorecard)

Sri Lanka; 171/7 (28 overs)	v	Zimbabwe; 166/7 (28 overs)
Kumar Sangakkara 57 (59); Tawanda Mupariwa 4/39 (6 overs)		Hamilton Masakadza 77 (71); Muttiah Muralitharan 2/20 (6 overs)

Sri Lanka by 5 runs
Harare Sports Club, Harare, Zimbabwe
Umpires: Aleem Dar (PAK) & Russell Tiffin (ZIM)
Player of the match: Hamilton Masakadza

=== 4th ODI ===
28 November
(scorecard)

Zimbabwe; 146 (46.3 overs)	v	Sri Lanka; 150/8 (47.3 overs)
Keith Dabengwa 32 (59); Ajantha Mendis 6/29 (9 overs)		Jehan Mubarak 60* (98); Tawanda Mupariwa 3/34 (10 overs)

Sri Lanka win by 2 wickets
Harare Sports Club, Harare, Zimbabwe
Umpires: Aleem Dar (PAK) & Russell Tiffin (ZIM)
Player of the match: Ajantha Mendis

=== 5th ODI ===
30 November
(scorecard)

Sri Lanka; 152 (48.5 overs)	v	Zimbabwe; 133 (44 overs)
Thilina Kandamby 40 (99); Ed Rainsford 3/22 (8.5 overs)		Keith Dabengwa 39 (91); Muttiah Muralitharan 5/29 (10 overs)

Sri Lanka won by 19 runs
Harare Sports Club, Harare, Zimbabwe
Umpires: Kevan Barbour & Russell Tiffin (both ZIM)
Player of the match: Muttiah Muralitharan

== Tour Matches ==
=== First Class:TBC v Sri Lankans ===
12–15 November
(scorecard)

Zimbabwe Select XI	v	Sri Lankans
159 (53.3 overs); Elton Chigumbura 33 (103); Ajantha Mendis 4/59 (16.3 overs)		567/4d (151 overs); Kumar Sangakkara 174 (273); Prosper Utseya 3/133 (39 overs)
238/5 (61 overs); Hamilton Masakadza 72 (117); Ajantha Mendis 4/86 (24 overs)

match drawn
Queens Sports Club, Bulawayo, Zimbabwe
Umpires: Owen Chirombe & Justice Tapfumaneyi (both ZIM)
Player of the match: Muttiah Muralitharan
