= September 2008 in sports =

<<	September 2008					>>
Su	Mo	Tu	We	Th	Fr	Sa
	1	2	3	4	5	6
7	8	9	10	11	12	13
14	15	16	17	18	19	20
21	22	23	24	25	26	27
28	29	30
Sports

This list shows notable sports-related deaths, events, and notable outcomes that occurred in September of 2008.

== Deaths ==
- 7: Don Haskins
- 18: Ron Lancaster
- 23: Rudolf Illovszky
- 26: Paul Newman
- 28: Thomas Thewes

== Current sporting seasons ==
- American football
  - 2008 NFL season
  - NCAA Division I FBS
- Auto racing 2008:
  - Formula 1
  - Sprint Cup
  - Nationwide
  - Craftsman Truck
  - World Rally Championship
  - IndyCar Series
  - American Le Mans
  - FIA GT
  - WTCC
  - V8 Supercar
  - Superleague Formula
- Baseball 2008:
  - Nippon Professional Baseball
  - Major League Baseball
- Basketball 2008:
  - Women's National Basketball Association
    - 2008 WNBA Playoffs
  - EuroBasket 2009 qualification
- Canadian football:
  - Canadian Football League
- Football (soccer) 2007–08:
  - Argentina
  - Ecuador
- Football (soccer) 2008:
  - Brazil
  - Japan
  - MLS
  - Norway
  - Sweden
- Football (soccer) 2008–09:
  - England
  - Germany
  - Italy
  - Spain
  - France
  - UEFA Champions League
  - UEFA Cup
  - 2010 FIFA World Cup Qualifying
- Golf 2008:
  - PGA Tour
  - European Tour
  - LPGA Tour
- Lacrosse 2008
  - National Lacrosse League
- Motorcycle racing 2008:
  - Moto GP
  - Superbike
- Rugby league
  - Super League
  - NRL
- Rugby union 2008–09:
  - Air New Zealand Cup
  - Currie Cup
  - English Premiership
  - Celtic League
  - Top 14

== 30 September 2008 (Tuesday) ==
- American football:
  - For the second time in two days, a National Football League head coach was sacked, this time Lane Kiffin of the Oakland Raiders. Tom Cable, the team's offensive line coach, was named as his interim replacement.
- Football (soccer):
  - UEFA Champions League group stage, week 2:
    - Group E: Aalborg BK (Denmark) 0–3 (England) Manchester United
    - Group E: Villarreal (Spain) 1–0 (Scotland) Celtic
    - Group F: Fiorentina (Italy) 0–0 (Romania) Steaua
    - Group F: Bayern (Germany) 1–1 (France) Lyon
    - Group G: Fenerbahçe (Turkey) 0–0 (Ukraine) Dynamo Kyiv
    - Group G: Arsenal (England) 4–0 (Portugal) Porto
    - Group H: BATE Borisov (Belarus) 2–2 (Italy) Juventus
    - Group H: Zenit St Petersburg (Russia) 1–2 (Spain) Real Madrid
  - UEFA Cup, First round, Second leg:
    (first leg result in brackets)
    - CSKA Moscow (Russia) 1–0 (Croatia) Slaven Belupo (2–1)
    - St Patrick's Athletic (Republic of Ireland) 0–0 (Germany) Hertha Berlin (0–2)
- Baseball:
  - Major League Baseball:
    - American League Central Division Playoff:
      - Chicago White Sox 1, Minnesota Twins 0
        - Jim Thome's 7th-inning solo home run sends the White Sox to face the Tampa Bay Rays in the ALDS starting on Thursday.
- Shooting:
  - 2008 ISSF World Cup Final (shotgun) in Minsk, Belarus:
    - Giovanni Pellielo (ITA) wins the world cup final in trap, and Tore Brovold (NOR) in skeet.

== 29 September 2008 (Monday) ==
- American football:
  - National Football League Monday Night Football Week 4:
    - Pittsburgh Steelers 23, Baltimore Ravens 20 (OT)
      - Jeff Reed's 46-yard field goal six minutes into overtime takes the Steelers to 3–1, while Baltimore drop to 2–1.
  - In off the field news, Scott Linehan was sacked as head coach of the St. Louis Rams and replaced by defensive coordinator Jim Haslett, the former head coach of the New Orleans Saints.
- Major League Baseball
  - American League Central Pennant Race:
    - Chicago White Sox 8, Detroit Tigers 2
      - The White Sox won this make-up game at U.S. Cellular Field thanks to Alexei Ramírez' sixth-inning grand slam, and now a playoff game will be played in Chicago on Tuesday against the Minnesota Twins.
- Basketball
  - 2008 Philippine NCAA men's basketball tournament finals at the Araneta Coliseum, Quezon City, Philippines
    - San Beda Red Lions 85–69 JRU Heavy Bombers, San Beda wins series 2–1

== 28 September 2008 (Sunday) ==
- American football:
  - National Football League Week 4:
    - New York Jets 56, Arizona Cardinals 35
      - After a scoreless first quarter, the Jets explode for 34 unanswered second-quarter points and cruise from there. Brett Favre throws for a career-high six touchdowns; although Kurt Warner throws for 472 yards for the Cardinals, he is also intercepted three times.
    - Carolina Panthers 24, Atlanta Falcons 9
      - Steve Smith and Muhsin Muhammad each catch a TD pass, while the Panthers defense shuts down what had been the NFL's top rushing attack.
    - Cleveland Browns 20, Cincinnati Bengals 12
      - Embattled QB Derek Anderson leads the Browns to their first win this season in the semiannual "Bungle in the Jungle".
    - Kansas City Chiefs 33, Denver Broncos 19
      - Larry Johnson rushes for 198 yards as the Chiefs rack up their first win of the season.
    - Tampa Bay Buccaneers 30, Green Bay Packers 21
      - Aaron Rodgers injured his shoulder in this game.
    - Jacksonville Jaguars 30, Houston Texans 27 (OT)
      - For the second straight week, a Josh Scobee field goal wins it for the Jags, this time a walk-off.
    - Tennessee Titans 30, Minnesota Vikings 17
      - The Titans go to 4–0 for the first time in franchise history, including their past as the Houston Oilers.
    - New Orleans Saints 31, San Francisco 49ers 17
      - Drew Brees throws for 363 yards and three TDs, while the Saints sack J. T. O'Sullivan six times and intercept him twice.
    - Buffalo Bills 31, St. Louis Rams 14
      - Reports were with the Rams' loss, head coach Scott Linehan would be sacked...
    - San Diego Chargers 28, Oakland Raiders 18
      - ...along with the coaching change pending with Lane Kiffin in Oakland after the Raiders' fall to the Lightning Bolts thanks to 25 fourth quarter San Diego points.
    - Washington Redskins 26, Dallas Cowboys 24
      - The Redskins win their last game at Texas Stadium.
    - Chicago Bears 24, Philadelphia Eagles 20
      - A fourth and goal stand by the Monsters of the Midway late in the 4th quarter gives "Da bears" da win over the "Iggles".

Bye week: Detroit Lions, Indianapolis Colts, Miami Dolphins, New England Patriots, New York Giants, Seattle Seahawks.

  - The NFL announced that Bruce Springsteen And The E Street Band would perform at halftime of Super Bowl XLIII during halftime of the Eagles-Bears telecast.
- Auto racing:
  - Formula One:
    - Singapore Grand Prix in Marina Bay, Singapore
      - (1) Fernando Alonso (Spain) (2) Nico Rosberg (Germany) (3) Lewis Hamilton (United Kingdom)
      - The first ever Formula 1 night race gives Lewis Hamilton a 7-point lead in the drivers' championship over Felipe Massa, with three races remaining.
  - Sprint Cup:
    - Camping World RV 400 presented by Coleman in Kansas City, Kansas
      - (1) Jimmie Johnson (California) (2) Carl Edwards (Missouri) (3) Greg Biffle (Washington (state))
- Baseball:
  - Major League Baseball Pennant Races:
    - American League Central:
      - Chicago White Sox 5, Cleveland Indians 1
      - Minnesota Twins 6, Kansas City Royals 0
        - With the gap between both the White Sox and the Twins remaining at ½ game in favor of the Twins, the White Sox now will play a make-up game against the Detroit Tigers on Monday at U.S. Cellular Field. Should the Sox win, they will host the Twins in a one-game playoff game on Tuesday.
    - National League Wild Card:
      - Florida Marlins 4, New York Mets 2
        - The swan song for Shea Stadium after 45 seasons is ruined by the Marlins at the Mets fail to make the postseason for the second straight season on the final day of the season.
      - Milwaukee Brewers 3, Chicago Cubs 1
        - CC Sabathia's four hit complete game and Ryan Braun's tiebreaking 8th inning homer puts the Brewers in the postseason for the first time since 1982. They'll face the Philadelphia Phillies in one NLDS while the Cubs will play the Los Angeles Dodgers.
- Cycling:
  - 2008 UCI Road World Championships:
    - Men's Road Race:
      Alessandro Ballan (Italy) (2) Damiano Cunego (Italy) (3) Matti Breschel (Denmark)
- Golf:
  - PGA Tour:
    - The Tour Championship in Atlanta
      - Camilo Villegas (Colombia) wins his second straight FedEx Cup playoff event on the first hole of a playoff with Sergio García (Spain) . Vijay Singh (Fiji) completes the four rounds that he needed to secure the 2008 FedEx Cup.
- Ice hockey:
  - Thomas Thewes, co-owner of the NHL's Carolina Hurricanes, dies from leukemia at the age of 76.
- Motorcycle racing:
  - Moto GP:
    - Japanese motorcycle Grand Prix in Motegi, Japan
      - (1) Valentino Rossi (Italy) (2) Casey Stoner (Australia) (3) Dani Pedrosa (Spain)
      - Rossi's race win made him a World Champion for the eighth time.
- Tennis:
  - ATP Tour:
    - China Open in Beijing, China:
      Final: (United States) Andy Roddick def. (Israel) Dudi Sela, 6–4, 6–7(6), 6–3
    - Thailand Open in Bangkok, Thailand:
      Final: (France) Jo-Wilfried Tsonga def. (Serbia) Novak Djokovic, 7–6(4), 6–4
  - WTA Tour:
    - China Open in Beijing, China:
      Final: (Serbia) Jelena Janković def. (Russia) Svetlana Kuznetsova, 6–3, 6–2
    - Hansol Korea Open in Seoul, South Korea:
      Final: (Russia) Maria Kirilenko def. (Australia) Samantha Stosur, 2–6, 6–1, 6–4

== 27 September 2008 (Saturday) ==
- American college football:
  - NCAA AP Top 10:
    - (2) Oklahoma 35, (24) Texas Christian 10
      - The Sooners stake their claim to being the new #1 team.
    - (8) Alabama 41, (3) Georgia 30
      - Bulldog head coach Mark Richt's call for a "blackout" "Between the Hedges" was over early thanks to 31 unanswered Crimson Tide points in the first half. Alabama jumps to #2 with this win.
    - Mississippi 31, (4) Florida 30
      - Jevan Snead throws for two touchdowns and runs for a third as the Rebels stun the Gators in The Swamp.
    - (5) LSU 34, Mississippi State 24
      - The current National Champions leap to the third spot.
    - (7) Texas 52, Arkansas 10
      - The Horns climb to #5 in the new survey.
    - Michigan 27, (9) Wisconsin 25
      - In the 500th game at "The Big House", the Wolverines erase a 19–0 halftime deficit.
    - Counting the Thursday night loss by top-ranked Southern California, three of the top four teams in the poll and four of the Top Ten teams lost, which will cause a shakeup in the new poll.
  - Other games:
    - (12) Penn State 38, (22) Illinois 24
    - Navy 24, (16) Wake Forest 17
      - The Middies defeat a ranked team for the first time since 1985.
    - Maryland 20, (20) Clemson 17
    - Houston 41, (23) East Carolina 24
- Australian rules football:
  - AFL Grand Final at Melbourne
    - Geelong 11.23 (89) – 18.7 (115) Hawthorn
- Baseball:
  - Major League Baseball Pennant Races:
    - American League:
      - Kansas City Royals 4, Minnesota Twins 2
      - Cleveland Indians 12, Chicago White Sox 6
        - The Central Division gap remains at one-half a game in favor of the Twins.
    - National League:
      - New York Mets 2, Florida Marlins 0
        - Johan Santana, pitching in a regular-season game on three days' rest for the first time in his career, keeps the Mets alive in the playoff race with a three-hit complete-game shutout, however...
      - Philadelphia Phillies 4, Washington Nationals 3
        - Jamie Moyer hurls six innings of one-run, six-hit ball, and Jayson Werth hits a leadoff fifth-inning homer as the Phils win the Eastern Division for the second straight year on a dramatic game ending bases-loaded double play, relegating the Mets to a Wild Card chase where...
      - Chicago Cubs 7, Milwaukee Brewers 3
        - Ben Sheets first start after a two-week layoff backfires, and the Brew Crew is now tied with the Mets for the Wild Card.
- Cycling:
  - 2008 UCI Road World Championships:
    - Women's Road Race:
      Nicole Cooke (United Kingdom) (2) Marianne Vos (Netherlands) (3) Judith Arndt (Germany)
- Rugby league:
  - NRL Finals series:
    - Manly-Warringah Sea Eagles 32 – 6 New Zealand Warriors in Sydney
- Shooting:
  - 2008 ISSF World Cup Final (shotgun) in Minsk, Belarus:
    - Håkan Dahlby (SWE) wins the world cup final in double trap.
- Thoroughbred horse racing:
  - By winning the Jockey Club Gold Cup at Belmont Park, Curlin becomes the richest horse in North American racing history, with US $10.25 million in winnings, passing Cigar.

== 26 September 2008 (Friday) ==
- Auto racing:
  - Actor Paul Newman, who was a driver and also an owner of an Indy Car team, dies from complications of cancer at his Westport, Connecticut farm home at the age of 83.
- Cycling:
  - 2008 UCI Road World Championships:
    - Men's Under-23 Road Race:
      (1) Fabio Duarte (Colombia) (2) Simone Ponzi (Italy) (3) John Degenkolb (Germany)
- Rugby league:
  - Super League playoffs :
    - Leeds Rhinos 18–14 Wigan Warriors in Leeds
  - NRL Finals series:
    - Cronulla-Sutherland Sharks 0 – 28 Melbourne Storm in Sydney
- Baseball:
  - Major League Baseball Pennant Races:
    - American League:
      - Detroit Tigers 6, Tampa Bay Rays 4
        - The Rays' loss assures the Los Angeles Angels the best record in the American League, and with it home advantage throughout the entire postseason, including the World Series.
      - New York Yankees 19, Boston Red Sox 8
        - Nonetheless, the Yankees' win hands the AL East title to the Rays in their 11th season, completing the "worst-to-first" scenario, and also locking in the AL Division Series matchups, with the Angels playing the Red Sox and the Rays playing the Twins or White Sox, with the Angels and Rays holding home field advantage for a possible fifth game. The Angels opted to open their series October 1 as they had the better record.
      - Kansas City Royals 8, Minnesota Twins 1
      - Cleveland Indians 11, Chicago White Sox 8
    - National League:
      - Philadelphia Phillies 8, Washington Nationals 4
      - Florida Marlins 6, New York Mets 1
        - The Phils clinch a tie for the NL East crown.
      - Milwaukee Brewers 5, Chicago Cubs 1
        - The Brew Crew take a 1-game lead over the Mets for the wild card.
      - Houston Astros 5, Atlanta Braves 4
        - The Astros win, but are eliminated from the wild card race with the Brewers' win.

== 25 September 2008 (Thursday) ==
- Cycling:
  - 2008 UCI Road World Championships:
    - Men's Time Trial:
      Bert Grabsch (Germany) (2) Svein Tuft (Canada) (3) David Zabriskie (United States)
- Baseball:
  - Major League Baseball Pennant Races:
    - American League:
      - Detroit Tigers 7, Tampa Bay Rays 5
      - Boston Red Sox 6, Cleveland Indians 1
        - The Rays fail to clinch the AL East.
      - Minnesota Twins 7, Chicago White Sox 6 (10 innings)
        - Alexi Casilla's RBI single in the bottom of the 10th completes a sweep of the Chisox, putting the Twins atop the AL Central by ½ game.
    - National League:
      - St. Louis Cardinals 12, Arizona Diamondbacks 3
        - The Los Angeles Dodgers clinched the West with the D-Backs' loss.
      - New York Mets 7, Chicago Cubs 6
        - The Mets come back from 3 runs down in the seventh inning, capped off by a walk-off RBI single from Carlos Beltrán. They close to within 1 game of the idle Philadelphia Phillies in the NL East.
      - Milwaukee Brewers 5, Pittsburgh Pirates 1 (10 innings)
        - The Brew Crew stay tied with the Mets in the NL wild card race thanks to a walk-off grand slam from Ryan Braun.
      - Houston Astros 8, Cincinnati Reds 6
        - The Astros still have a pulse in the Wild Card race, and hold off a furious Reds rally in the 9th.
- Basketball
  - 2008 UAAP men's basketball tournament finals at the Araneta Coliseum, Quezon City, Philippines
    - Ateneo Blue Eagles 62–51 De La Salle Green Archers, Ateneo wins series 2–0.
- American college football:
  - NCAA AP Top 10:
    - Oregon State 27, (1) Southern California 21
      - The national championship race is blown wide-open as the Trojans are ambushed in Corvallis for the second straight time and third in their last four visits. This is the first #1 scalp for the Beavers since the 1967 "Giant Killers" team beat a USC team featuring O. J. Simpson.

== 24 September 2008 (Wednesday) ==
- Cycling:
  - 2008 UCI Road World Championships in Varese, Italy:
    - Women's Time Trial:
      Amber Neben (United States) (2) Christiane Soeder (Austria) (3) Judith Arndt (Germany)
  - Other news:
    - Seven-time Tour de France winner Lance Armstrong, who came out of retirement earlier this month, announces that he will ride for the Astana Team. Not coincidentally, the team is managed by Johan Bruyneel, who was Armstrong's team manager for all seven of his Tour titles. (AP via ESPN.com)
- American football:
  - The Detroit Lions sack Matt Millen as president and general manager after seven years, during which they lost 84 games, the most among NFL teams.
- Baseball:
  - Major League Baseball playoff races:
    - American League:
      - Boston Red Sox 5, Cleveland Indians 4
      - Tampa Bay Rays 11, Baltimore Orioles 6
        - The Rays' win clinches a tie for the American League East title.
      - Minnesota Twins 3, Chicago White Sox 2
        - The Twins close to within ½ game of the Chisox.
    - National League:
      - Atlanta Braves 10, Philadelphia Phillies 4
        - The Braves rough up the NL East-leading Phils...
      - Chicago Cubs 9, New York Mets 6 (10 innings)
        - ...but the Mets can't take advantage, leaving a runner on third base in each inning from the 5th through the 9th before the Cubs break it open in the 10th. Meanwhile...
      - Milwaukee Brewers 4, Pittsburgh Pirates 2
        - ...CC Sabathia, pitching on three days' rest for the Brewers, strikes out 11 in 7 innings. The Mets and Brewers are now tied for the wild card, and the Phils remain 1½ games ahead of the Mets with a magic number of 3.
      - St. Louis Cardinals 4, Arizona Diamondbacks 2
      - Los Angeles Dodgers 12, San Diego Padres 4
        - The Dodgers clinch a tie for the National League West title with their win and the D-backs' loss.

== 23 September 2008 (Thursday) ==
- Baseball:
  - Major League Baseball playoff races:
    - American League:
      - Boston Red Sox 5, Cleveland Indians 4
        - The Bosox clinch a playoff berth, and officially end the New York Yankees' run of 13 straight postseason appearances.
      - Tampa Bay Rays 5, Baltimore Orioles 2 (Game 1)
      - Tampa Bay Rays 7, Baltimore Orioles 5 (Game 2)
        - The Rays' first doubleheader sweep in their history, capped off by a six-run eighth inning in Game 2, reduces their magic number for the AL East title to 2.
      - Minnesota Twins 9, Chicago White Sox 3
        - The Twins win the first of a key 3-game series at the Metrodome and close to within 1½ games of the Chisox.
    - National League:
      - Atlanta Braves 3, Philadelphia Phillies 2
        - The Phillies' magic number for the NL East crown remains at 4.
      - New York Mets 6, Chicago Cubs 2
      - Milwaukee Brewers 7, Pittsburgh Pirates 5
        - Prince Fielder's walk-off home run keeps the Brew Crew 1 game back of the Mets for the NL wild card.
      - St. Louis Cardinals 7, Arizona Diamondbacks 4
      - Los Angeles Dodgers 10, San Diego Padres 1
        - The Dodgers reduce their magic number in the NL West to 3 with the win and the D-Backs' loss.
- Cycling:
  - 2008 UCI Road World Championships in Varese, Italy:
    - Men's Under-23 Time Trial:
      Adriano Malori (Italy) (2) Patrick Gretsch (Germany) (3) Cameron Meyer (Australia)

== 22 September 2008 (Monday) ==
- American football:
  - National Football League Monday Night Football Week 3:
    - San Diego Chargers 48, New York Jets 29
      - The Chargers collect their first win of the season, with Philip Rivers throwing for three touchdowns, LaDainian Tomlinson running for two more, and the defense sacking Brett Favre four times and intercepting him twice, returning one for a touchdown.
- Baseball:
  - Major League Baseball playoff races:
    - American League:
      - Cleveland Indians 4, Boston Red Sox 3
        - The Red Sox remain one win or one New York Yankees loss away from clinching the AL wild card.
      - Tampa Bay Rays 4, Baltimore Orioles 2
        - The Rays' lead over the Bosox in the AL East goes to 2½ games, and their magic number to clinch the division drops to 4.
    - National League:
      - Chicago Cubs 9, New York Mets 5
        - The Cubs clinch home-field advantage throughout the NL playoffs and deal the Mets' hopes of winning the NL East a serious blow. The Mets' lead in the NL wild card race over the idle Milwaukee Brewers drops to 1 game.
      - Philadelphia Phillies 6, Atlanta Braves 2
        - The Phillies increase their lead in the NL East to 2½ games.
      - Arizona Diamondbacks 4, St. Louis Cardinals 2
        - The D-backs close to within 2 games of the idle Los Angeles Dodgers in the NL West.

== 21 September 2008 (Sunday) ==
- American football:
  - National Football League Week 3:
    - Atlanta Falcons 38, Kansas City Chiefs 14
      - Michael Turner runs for three touchdowns to lead the Falcons.
    - Buffalo Bills 24, Oakland Raiders 23
      - The Bills score 17 points in the final 8 minutes, capped off by a field goal from Rian Lindell as time expires. After the game, it was reported (as it turned out, a week prematurely) that Raiders owner Al Davis would fire head coach Lane Kiffin as early as Monday.
    - Tampa Bay Buccaneers 27, Chicago Bears 24 (OT)
      - Brian Griese throws for 407 yards and leads the Bucs back from a 10-point deficit in the final 4 minutes of regulation against his former team, with Matt Bryant's field goal securing the win in overtime.
    - Minnesota Vikings 20, Carolina Panthers 10
      - The previously winless Vikings defeat the previously unbeaten Panthers behind a defense that allows only 204 total yards and scores a TD.
    - Miami Dolphins 38, New England Patriots 13
      - The Dolphins end the Pats' NFL-record regular-season winning streak at 21 games. Ronnie Brown scores four rushing touchdowns and throws for a fifth TD.
    - New York Giants 26, Cincinnati Bengals 23 (OT)
      - John Carney's field goal in overtime sends the Giants to 3–0 for the first time since 2000.
    - Tennessee Titans 31, Houston Texans 12
      - The Titans go to 3–0 for the first time since 1999, thanks to two rushing TDs from LenDale White, three interceptions from their defense, and the Texans' red-zone futility (only 12 points from six trips inside the Titans' 14-yard line).
    - Washington Redskins 24, Arizona Cardinals 17
      - For the second straight week, the Skins get their winning points from a TD pass from Jason Campbell to Santana Moss.
    - Denver Broncos 34, New Orleans Saints 32
      - The Broncos jump to a 21–3 lead, and manage to hold on after a furious Saints comeback. Drew Brees throws for 421 yards and Reggie Bush scores two TDs, but the Saints are done in after a late field goal attempt by Martín Gramática sails wide.
    - San Francisco 49ers 31, Detroit Lions 13
      - The Niners dominate the Lions behind 130 rushing yards and a TD from Frank Gore and two TD passes from J. T. O'Sullivan.
    - Seattle Seahawks 37, St. Louis Rams 13
      - The Seahawks are led by a running attack that produces 140 yards and a TD from Julius Jones and two TDs from T. J. Duckett.
    - Baltimore Ravens 28, Cleveland Browns 10
      - In a 50-second span in the third quarter, the Ravens return one Derek Anderson interception for a TD and turn a second Anderson pick into a touchdown to blow open a tight game.
    - Jacksonville Jaguars 23, Indianapolis Colts 21
      - The Jags' Fred Taylor and Maurice Jones-Drew each run for over 100 yards, and Josh Scobee kicks the winning 51-yard field goal with 4 seconds left. The Colts remain winless at their new Lucas Oil Stadium.
    - Philadelphia Eagles 15, Pittsburgh Steelers 6
      - The Eagles win with defense, sacking Ben Roethlisberger eight times and knocking him out of the game, scoring a safety, and forcing three turnovers.
    - Dallas Cowboys 27, Green Bay Packers 16
      - The Cowboys, behind 142 yards on the ground from Marion Barber and a 60-yard TD run from Felix Jones, win at Lambeau Field for the first time in their history.
- Auto racing:
  - Sprint Cup:
    - Camping World RV 400 in Dover, Delaware
      - (1) Greg Biffle (Washington (state)) (2) Matt Kenseth (Wisconsin) (3) Carl Edwards (Missouri)
  - World Touring Car Championship season: Autodromo Enzo e Dino Ferrari at Imola, Italy
    - Race 1: (1) Yvan Muller (France) (2) Rickard Rydell (Sweden) (3) James Thompson (United Kingdom)
    - Race 2: (1) James Thompson (United Kingdom) (2) Jörg Müller (Germany) (3) Robert Huff (United Kingdom)
  - Deutsche Tourenwagen Masters: Round 9 at Circuit de Catalunya, Spain
    - (1) Paul di Resta (United Kingdom) (2) Timo Scheider (Germany) (3) Bernd Schneider (Germany)
- Baseball:
  - Major League Baseball playoff races:
    - American League:
      - Chicago White Sox 3, Kansas City Royals 0
      - Minnesota Twins 4, Tampa Bay Rays 1
        - The White Sox keep a 2½-game lead over Minnesota in the AL Central going into a key three-game series between the two in the Metrodome.
      - Boston Red Sox 3, Toronto Blue Jays 0
        - The Red Sox clinch a tie for the AL wild card, and also reduce their deficit to the Rays in the AL East race to 1½ games.
    - National League:
      - Atlanta Braves 7, New York Mets 6
        - The Mets' bullpen blows a late lead, giving up four runs to the Braves in the 8th inning.
      - Philadelphia Phillies 5, Florida Marlins 2
        - The Phillies increase their lead in the NL East to 1½ games.
      - Chicago Cubs 5, St. Louis Cardinals 1
        - The Cubs continue their winning ways, and are now one win away from clinching home-field advantage throughout the NL playoffs.
      - Milwaukee Brewers 8, Cincinnati Reds 1
        - The Brewers stop their slide, closing to within 1½ games of the Mets in the wild-card race.
      - Arizona Diamondbacks 13, Colorado Rockies 4
        - The D-backs pick up a game on the Dodgers in the NL West race.
      - San Francisco Giants 1, Los Angeles Dodgers 0 (11 innings)
        - An RBI single from Rich Aurilia gives the Giants the run they need to temporarily stall the Dodgers' drive for the NL West crown. The Dodgers' magic number remains at 5.
    - In another game:
      - New York Yankees 7, Baltimore Orioles 3
        - The Yankees end their 85-year run at Yankee Stadium on a winning note.
- Cycling:
  - Vuelta a España:
    - General classification:
      (Spain) Alberto Contador (2) (United States) Levi Leipheimer (3) (Spain) Carlos Sastre
- Gaelic football:
  - All-Ireland Senior Championship at Dublin:
    - Kerry 0–14 (14) – 1–15 (18) Tyrone
- Golf:
  - Ryder Cup in Louisville, Kentucky:
    - United States 16½ – 11½ Europe
      - Team USA wins the Cup for the first time since 1999, in a performance that saw them lead after every session of play for the first time since 1979.
  - PGA Tour:
    - Viking Classic in Madison, Mississippi
- Motorcycle racing:
  - Superbike:
    - Vallelunga Superbike World Championship round at Campagnano di Roma, Italy:
      - Race 1 classification: (1) (Japan) Noriyuki Haga (2) (Italy) Max Biaggi (3) (Australia) Troy Corser
      - Race 2 classification: (1) (Japan) Noriyuki Haga (2) (Italy) Michel Fabrizio (3) (Australia) Troy Corser
- Tennis:
  - Davis Cup Semifinals, day 3:
    - Argentina 3–2 Russia in Buenos Aires, Argentina
    - Spain 4–1 United States in Madrid, Spain
  - Davis Cup World Group play-offs, day 3:
    - Chile 3–2 Australia in Antofagasta, Chile
    - Great Britain 2–3 Austria in Wimbledon, London, Great Britain
    - Switzerland 4–1 Belgium in Lausanne, Switzerland
    - Croatia 4–1 Brazil in Zadar, Croatia
    - Israel 4–1 Peru in Ramat HaSharon, Israel
    - Netherlands 3–2 South Korea in Apeldoorn, Netherlands
    - Romania 4–1 India in Bucharest, Romania
    - Slovakia 1–4 Serbia in Bratislava, Slovakia
  - WTA Tour:
    - 2008 Toray Pan Pacific Open in Tokyo, Japan
      - Final: (Russia) Dinara Safina def. (Russia) Svetlana Kuznetsova, 6–1, 6–3
    - 2008 Guangzhou International Women's Open in Guangzhou, China
      - Final: (Russia) Vera Zvonareva def. (China) Shuai Peng, 6–7(4), 6–0, 6–2

== 20 September 2008 (Saturday) ==
- American college football:
  - NCAA AP Top 10:
    - (3) Georgia 27, Arizona State 10
    - (4) Florida 30, Tennessee 6
    - (5) Missouri 42, Buffalo 21
    - (6) LSU 26, (10) Auburn 21
    - (7) Texas 52, Rice 10
    - (9) Alabama 49, Arkansas 14
  - Other games:
    - North Carolina State 30, (15) East Carolina 24 (OT)
    - Boise State 37, (17) Oregon 32
    - (18) Wake Forest 12, (24) Florida State 3
- Australian rules football:
  - AFL finals series:
    - Preliminary Final 2 at Melbourne:
      Hawthorn 18.10 (118) – 9.10 (64) St Kilda
- Baseball:
  - Major League Baseball playoff races:
    - American League:
      - Tampa Bay Rays 7, Minnesota Twins 2
        - The Rays clinch their first playoff appearance in franchise history.
      - Toronto Blue Jays 6, Boston Red Sox 3
        - The Red Sox fall 2½ games behind Tampa Bay in the American League East.
      - Kansas City Royals 5, Chicago White Sox 2
        - The White Sox keep a 2½-game lead over Minnesota in the AL Central.
    - National League:
      - Atlanta Braves 4, New York Mets 2
      - Philadelphia Phillies 3, Florida Marlins 2
        - The Phillies take a half-game lead in the NL East.
      - Chicago Cubs 5, St. Louis Cardinals 4
        - The Cubs clinch their second-straight NL Central title. This is the first time that the Cubs have advanced to the postseason in consecutive years since 1908.
      - Cincinnati Reds 4, Milwaukee Brewers 3
        - The Brewers fall further behind in the wild-card race.
      - Arizona Diamondbacks 5, Colorado Rockies 3
      - Los Angeles Dodgers 10, San Francisco Giants 7
        - Two homers from Manny Ramírez lead the Dodgers to a win that reduces their magic number to 5.
- Golf:
  - Ryder Cup in Louisville, Kentucky:
    - After Saturday afternoon four-ball matches:
      United States 9 – 7 Europe
- Rugby league:
  - Super League playoffs:
    - Catalans Dragons 26 – 50 Wigan Warriors
      - Wigan blow open a tight game in Perpignan with six second-half tries.
  - NRL Finals series semifinal:
    - Brisbane Broncos 14 – 16 Melbourne Storm
- Tennis:
  - Davis Cup Semifinals, day 2:
    - Argentina 2–1 Russia in Buenos Aires, Argentina
    - Spain 2–1 United States in Madrid, Spain
  - Davis Cup World Group play-offs, day 2:
    - Chile 2–1 Australia in Antofagasta, Chile
    - Great Britain 1–2 Austria in Wimbledon, London, Great Britain
    - Switzerland 3–0 Belgium in Lausanne, Switzerland
    - Croatia 2–1 Brazil in Zadar, Croatia
    - Israel 2–1 Peru in Ramat HaSharon, Israel
    - Netherlands 2–1 South Korea in Apeldoorn, Netherlands
    - Romania 2–1 India in Bucharest, Romania
    - Slovakia 0–3 Serbia in Bratislava, Slovakia

== 19 September 2008 (Friday) ==
- Australian rules football:
  - AFL finals series:
    - Preliminary Final 1 at Melbourne:
      Geelong 12.11 (83) – 7.12 (54) Western Bulldogs
- Golf:
  - Ryder Cup in Louisville, Kentucky:
    - After Friday afternoon's four balls:
      United States 5½–2½ Europe.
- Rugby league:
  - Super League playoffs:
    - St. Helens 38–10 Leeds Rhinos
      - On the same day that Saints legend Paul Sculthorpe announces his retirement from rugby league, they run in seven tries to book their place in the Super League Grand Final in two weeks' time at Old Trafford.
  - NRL Finals series semifinal:
    - New Zealand Warriors 30–13 Sydney Roosters
- Tennis:
  - Davis Cup Semifinals, day 1:
    - Argentina 2–0 Russia in Buenos Aires, Argentina
    - Spain 2–0 United States in Madrid, Spain
  - Davis Cup World Group play-offs, day 1:
    - Chile 2–0 Australia in Antofagasta, Chile
    - Great Britain 1–1 Austria in Wimbledon, London, Great Britain
    - Switzerland 2–0 Belgium in Lausanne, Switzerland
    - Croatia 2–0 Brazil in Zadar, Croatia
    - Israel 1–1 Peru in Ramat HaSharon, Israel
    - Netherlands 1–1 South Korea in Apeldoorn, Netherlands
    - Romania 2–0 India in Bucharest, Romania
    - Slovakia 0–2 Serbia in Bratislava, Slovakia

== 18 September 2008 (Thursday) ==
- American college football:
  - Colorado 17, (21) West Virginia 14 (OT)
- Football (soccer):
  - UEFA Cup, First round, First leg:
    - Milan (Italy) 3–1 FC Zürich (Switzerland)
    - Timişoara (Romania) 1–2 Partizan (Serbia)
    - Baník Ostrava (Czech Republic) 0–1 Spartak Moscow (Russia)
    - Beşiktaş (Turkey) 1–0 Metalist Kharkiv (Ukraine)
    - Portsmouth (England) 2–0 Vitoria Guimarães (Portugal)
    - Kayserispor (Turkey) 1–2 Paris Saint-Germain (France)
    - Sevilla (Spain) 2–0 Red Bull Salzburg (Austria)
    - Wolfsburg (Germany) 1–0 Rapid București (Romania)
    - Sampdoria (Italy) 5–0 Kaunas (Lithuania)
    - Maritimo (Portugal) 0–1 Valencia (Spain)
    - Dinamo Zagreb (Croatia) 0–0 Sparta Prague (Czech Republic)
    - Omonia (Cyprus) 1–2 Manchester City (England)
    - Young Boys (Switzerland) 2–2 Club Brugge (Belgium)
    - Nancy (France) 1–0 Motherwell (Scotland)
    - Everton (England) 2–2 Standard Liège (Belgium)
    - Napoli (Italy) 3–2 Benfica (Portugal)
    - Bellinzona (Switzerland) 3–4 Galatasaray (Turkey)
    - NEC (Netherlands) 1–0 Dinamo București (Romania)
    - Racing Santander (Spain) 1–0 Honka (Finland)
    - Litex Lovech (Bulgaria) 1–3 Aston Villa (England)
    - Austria Wien 2–1 Lech Poznań (Poland)
    - Vitoria Setúbal (Portugal) 1–1 Heerenveen (Netherlands)
    - Brann (Norway) 2–0 Deportivo (Spain)
    - Slavia Prague (Czech Republic) 0–0 Vaslui (Romania)
    - Slaven Belupo (Croatia) 1–2 CSKA Moscow (Russia)
    - Brøndby (Denmark) 1–2 Rosenborg (Norway)
    - Cherno More (Bulgaria) 1–2 Stuttgart (Germany)
    - Rennes (France) 2–1 Twente (Netherlands)
    - Borac Čačak (Serbia) 1–4 Ajax (Netherlands)
    - Tottenham Hotspur (England) 2–1 Wisła Kraków (Poland)
    - FC Moscow (Russia) 1–2 Copenhagen (Denmark)
    - Žilina (Slovakia) 1–1 Levski Sofia (Bulgaria)
    - Borussia Dortmund (Germany) 0–2 Udinese (Italy)
    - Braga (Portugal) 4–0 Artmedia Petržalka (Slovakia)
    - Feyenoord (Netherlands) 0–1 Kalmar (Sweden)
    - Hamburg (Germany) 0–0 Unirea Urziceni (Romania)
    - Hapoel Tel Aviv (Israel) 1–2 Saint-Étienne (France)

== 17 September 2008 (Wednesday) ==
- Football (soccer):
  - UEFA Champions League group stage, week 1:
    - Group E: Manchester United (England) 0 – 0 (Spain) Villarreal
    - Group E: Celtic (Scotland) 0 – 0 (Denmark) Aalborg BK
    - Group F: Steaua (Romania) 0 – 1 (Germany) Bayern
    - Group F: Lyon (France) 2 – 2 (Italy) Fiorentina
    - Group G: Dynamo Kyiv (Ukraine) 1 – 1 (England) Arsenal
    - Group G: Porto (Portugal) 3 – 1 (Turkey) Fenerbahçe
    - Group H: Juventus (Italy) 1 – 0 (Russia) Zenit St Petersburg
    - Group H: Real Madrid (Spain) 2 – 0 (Belarus) BATE Borisov

== 16 September 2008 (Tuesday) ==
- Football (soccer):
  - UEFA Champions League group stage, week 1:
    - Group A: Chelsea (England) 4 – 0 (France) Bordeaux
    - Group A: Roma (Italy) 1 – 2 (Romania) CFR Cluj
    - Group B: Panathinaikos (Greece) 0 – 2 (Italy) Internazionale
    - Group B: Werder Bremen (Germany) 0 – 0 (Cyprus) Anorthosis
    - Group C: Basel (Switzerland) 1 – 2 (Ukraine) Shakhtar Donetsk
    - Group C: Barcelona (Spain) 3 – 1 (Portugal) Sporting CP
    - Group D: PSV Eindhoven (Netherlands) 0 – 3 (Spain) Atlético Madrid
    - Group D: Marseille (France) 1 – 2 (England) Liverpool
  - UEFA Cup, First round, First leg:
    - Hertha BSC (Germany) 2 – 0 (Republic of Ireland) St. Patrick's Athletic
    - APOEL (Cyprus) 1 – 4 (Germany) Schalke 04
    - Nordsjælland (Denmark) 0 – 2 (Greece) Olympiacos

== 15 September 2008 (Monday) ==
- American football:
  - National Football League Monday Night Football Week 2:
    - Dallas Cowboys 41, Philadelphia Eagles 37
      - In the last MNF game at Texas Stadium, drawing the largest viewing audience in United States cable TV history, a memorable game was played featuring seven lead changes, the most points scored in the history of the Cowboys–Eagles rivalry, numerous big plays, and a major mistake by the Eagles' DeSean Jackson, who loses a touchdown when he prematurely tosses the ball behind him before crossing the goal line.

== 14 September 2008 (Sunday) ==
mancity against liverpool 10 07

    - Tennessee Titans 24, Cincinnati Bengals 7
      - The Titans combine an effective running game with short passes from backup quarterback Kerry Collins to win in windy Paul Brown Stadium.
    - Buffalo Bills 20, Jacksonville Jaguars 16
      - Trent Edwards completes 20 of 25 passes, including the game-winner to James Hardy
    - Oakland Raiders 23, Kansas City Chiefs 8
      - Darren McFadden accounts for 164 of the Raiders' 300 rushing yards.
    - Indianapolis Colts 18, Minnesota Vikings 15
      - Peyton Manning leads the Colts back from a 15–0 deficit, then Adam Vinatieri boots a 47-yard field goal to win the game.
    - Carolina Panthers 20, Chicago Bears 17
      - The Panthers score 17 unanswered points before stopping the Bears on fourth-and-1 to go 2–0.
    - Green Bay Packers 48, Detroit Lions 25
      - Green Bay blows a 21–0 lead but scores three touchdowns off Jon Kitna interceptions in the final 3:31.
    - New York Giants 41, St. Louis Rams 13
      - Eli Manning torches the hapless Rams for three touchdowns.
    - Washington Redskins 29, New Orleans Saints 24
      - Jason Campbell hits Santana Moss for a 67-yard touchdown pass with 3:29 left; rookie Chris Horton then intercepts Drew Brees for his third turnover of the game.
    - New England Patriots 19, New York Jets 10
      - In his first start since high school, Matt Cassel makes no mistakes and the Pats spoil Brett Favre's home debut with the Jets.
    - Arizona Cardinals 31, Miami Dolphins 10
      - Kurt Warner carves up the Dolphins defense, going 19-for-24 with three TDs, all to Anquan Boldin, and 361 yards.
    - Tampa Bay Buccaneers 24, Atlanta Falcons 9
      - The Bucs intercept Matt Ryan twice, and Earnest Graham runs for 116 yards, including a 68-yard TD run with 3:23 left that seals the win.
    - San Francisco 49ers 33, Seattle Seahawks 30 (OT)
      - J. T. O'Sullivan throws for 321 yards, leading to Joe Nedney's game-winning field goal from 40 yards.
    - Denver Broncos 39, San Diego Chargers 38
      - After a blown call keeps the Broncos alive, Jay Cutler hits Eddie Royal for a TD with 29 seconds left. Coach Mike Shanahan goes for two, and Cutler connects with Royal for the winning points. Brandon Marshall catches a team-record 18 passes for Denver.
    - Pittsburgh Steelers 10, Cleveland Browns 6
      - In the remnants of Hurricane Ike, which postponed the Baltimore Ravens–Houston Texans game until November 9 due to damage to the retractable roof at Reliant Stadium, the Steelers win thanks to the only touchdown of the game by the Steelers' Hines Ward.

Bye week: Houston Texans, Baltimore Ravens.

- Auto racing:
  - Formula One:
    - Italian Grand Prix at Autodromo Nazionale Monza, Italy
      - (1) Sebastian Vettel (Germany) (2) Heikki Kovalainen (Finland) (3) Robert Kubica (Poland)
      - Sebastian Vettel gives the Toro Rosso team their first-ever Grand Prix win, and at 21 years, 73 days old becomes the youngest-ever winner of a Formula 1 race.
  - FIA GT Championship:
    - Brno 2 Hours, at Brno Circuit, Czech Republic:
      - (1) Karl Wendlinger (Austria) & Ryan Sharp (United Kingdom) (2) Mike Hezemans (Netherlands) & Fabrizio Gollin (Italy) (3) Christophe Bouchut (France) & Xavier Maassen (Netherlands)
  - Sprint Cup:
    - Sylvania 300 in Loudon, New Hampshire, United States
      - (1) Greg Biffle (Washington (state)) (2) Jimmie Johnson (California) (3) Carl Edwards (Missouri)
  - V8 Supercar:
    - L&H 500 at Phillip Island Grand Prix Circuit in Phillip Island, Victoria, Australia
      - (1) Garth Tander (Australia) & Mark Skaife (Australia) (2) Jamie Whincup (Australia) & Craig Lowndes (Australia) (3) Will Davison (Australia) & Steven Johnson (Australia)
- Baseball:
  - In a game moved to Milwaukee due to the aftermath of Hurricane Ike in Houston, Carlos Zambrano of the Chicago Cubs throws a no-hitter against the Houston Astros. This is the second no-hitter this season, the first by a Cubs pitcher since 1972, and the first no-hitter at a neutral site in Major League Baseball history.
- Motorcycle racing:
  - Moto GP:
    - Indianapolis motorcycle Grand Prix at Indianapolis Motor Speedway, Indiana, United States:
      - (1) Valentino Rossi (Italy) (2) Nicky Hayden (United States) (3) Jorge Lorenzo (Spain)
- Tennis:
  - Fed Cup Final in Madrid, Spain:
    - Russia def. Spain 4–0
  - ATP Tour:
    - Romanian Open in Bucharest, Romania:
      - Final: (France) Gilles Simon def. (Spain) Carlos Moyá 6–3 6–4
  - WTA Tour:
    - Commonwealth Bank Tennis Classic in Bali, Indonesia:
      - Final: (Switzerland) Patty Schnyder def. (Austria) Tamira Paszek 6–3 6–0

== 13 September 2008 (Saturday) ==
- American college football:
  - NCAA AP Top 10:
    - (1) Southern California 35, (5) Ohio State 3
    - (2) Georgia 14, South Carolina 7
    - (3) Oklahoma 55, Washington 14
    - (6) Missouri 69, Nevada 17
    - (7) LSU 41, North Texas 3
    - Arkansas at (8) Texas — postponed to September 27 due to Hurricane Ike.
    - (9) Auburn 3, Mississippi State 2
    - (10) Wisconsin 13, (21) Fresno State 10
  - Other games:
    - UNLV 23, (15) Arizona State 20, OT
    - Maryland 35, (23) California 27
- American football:
  - Due to damage suffered to Reliant Stadium the NFL contest between the Baltimore Ravens and the Houston Texans was postponed to November 9, which was to have been the scheduled bye week for the Ravens. In addition, the October 26 Texans' home contest would now be against the Cincinnati Bengals, which was moved from said November 9 date in lieu of the Texans' own bye week.
- Australian rules football:
  - AFL finals series
    - Semi Final 1 at Melbourne
      - St Kilda 17.4 (106) – Collingwood 9.18 (72)
- Auto racing:
  - Formula One:
    - Italian Grand Prix iqualifying n Monza, Italy
      - Toro Rosso driver Sebastian Vettel (Germany) qualifies on the pole, becoming the youngest driver in F1 history to do so at age 21 years, 72 days. Championship leader Lewis Hamilton (United Kingdom) qualifies 15th, and reigning world champion Kimi Räikkönen (Finland) also fails to get into session 3 by qualifying 14th.
- Baseball:
  - Los Angeles Angels closer Francisco Rodríguez sets a new Major League Baseball record with his 58th save of the season. The previous record had been set in 1990 by Bobby Thigpen of the Chicago White Sox.
- Rugby league:
  - Super League playoffs: Elimination Quarter-Final A at Perpignan
    - Catalans Dragons 46–8 Warrington Wolves
      - The Catalans make their Super League playoff debut a winning one.
- Rugby union:
  - Tri Nations Series:
    - Australia 24–28 New Zealand at Brisbane
      - The All Blacks come back from a 17–7 deficit early in the second half to win the Tri Nations crown. The win also ensures that the All Blacks will retain the Bledisloe Cup.

== 12 September 2008 (Friday) ==
- Australian rules football:
  - AFL finals series
    - Semi Final 2 at Melbourne
      - Western Bulldogs 18.10 (106) – Sydney Swans 9.15 (69)
- Rugby league:
  - Super League playoffs: Elimination Quarter-Final B at Widnes
    - Wigan Warriors 30–14 Bradford Bulls

== 10 September 2008 (Wednesday) ==
- Baseball:
  - The Los Angeles Angels clinch the American League West Division through a 4–2 win over the New York Yankees coupled by the Texas Rangers' 8–7 loss to the Seattle Mariners.
- Football (soccer):
  - 2010 FIFA World Cup qualification (UEFA):
    - Group 1: Albania 3 – 0 Malta
    - Group 1: Sweden 2 – 1 Hungary
    - Group 1: Portugal 2 – 3 Denmark
    - Group 2: Moldova 1 – 2 Israel
    - Group 2: Latvia 0 – 2 Greece
    - Group 2: Switzerland 1 – 2 Luxembourg
    - Group 3: San Marino 0 – 2 Poland
    - Group 3: Northern Ireland 0 – 0 Czech Republic
    - Group 3: Slovenia 2 – 1 Slovakia
    - Group 4: Russia 2 – 1 Wales
    - Group 4: Azerbaijan 0 – 0 Liechtenstein
    - Group 4: Finland 3 – 3 Germany
    - Group 5: Turkey 1 – 1 Belgium
    - Group 5: Bosnia and Herzegovina 7 – 0 Estonia
    - Group 5: Spain 4 – 0 Armenia
    - Group 6: Kazakhstan 1 – 3 Ukraine
    - Group 6: Andorra 1 – 3 Belarus
    - Group 6: Croatia 1 – 4 England
    - Group 7: Faroe Islands 0 – 1 Romania
    - Group 7: Lithuania 2 – 0 Austria
    - Group 7: France 2 – 1 Serbia
    - Group 8: Montenegro 0 – 0 Republic of Ireland
    - Group 8: Italy 2 – 0 Georgia
    - Group 9: Iceland 1 – 2 Scotland
    - Group 9: North Macedonia 1 – 2 Netherlands
  - 2010 FIFA World Cup qualification (CONMEBOL):
    - Uruguay 0 – 0 Ecuador
    - Chile 4 – 0 Colombia
    - Brazil 0 – 0 Bolivia
    - Peru 1 – 1 Argentina
  - 2010 FIFA World Cup qualification (CAF):
    - Group 10: Chad 1 – 3 Sudan
    - Group 11: Zambia 1 – 0 Togo
  - 2010 FIFA World Cup qualification (CONCACAF):
    - Group 1: United States 3 – 0 Trinidad and Tobago
    - Group 1: Guatemala 4 – 1 Cuba
    - Group 2: Mexico 2 – 1 Canada
    - Group 2: Honduras 2 – 0 Jamaica
    - Group 3: Suriname 0 – 2 El Salvador
    - Group 3: Haiti 1 – 3 Costa Rica
  - 2010 FIFA World Cup qualification (AFC):
    - Group A: Uzbekistan 0 – 1 Australia
    - Group A: Qatar 1 – 1 Bahrain
    - Group B: North Korea 1 – 1 South Korea
      - (Played in Shanghai, China).
    - Group B: United Arab Emirates 1 – 2 Saudi Arabia
  - 2010 FIFA World Cup qualification (OFC):
    - New Zealand 3 – 0 New Caledonia
    - Vanuatu 2 – 1 Fiji

== 9 September 2008 (Tuesday) ==
- Cycling:
  - In an exclusive interview with Vanity Fair magazine, seven-time Tour de France winner Lance Armstrong reveals that he will come out of retirement and race in the 2009 Tour. (VanityFair.com)
- Football (soccer):
  - 2010 FIFA World Cup qualification (CONMEBOL):
    - Paraguay 2 – 0 Venezuela

== 8 September 2008 (Monday) ==
- American football:
  - National Football League Monday Night Football Week 1:
    - Green Bay Packers 24, Minnesota Vikings 19
      - Aaron Rodgers completes 18 of 22 passes in his first game as Packers starting quarterback.
    - Denver Broncos 41, Oakland Raiders 14
      - Rookie wide receiver Eddie Royal catches nine passes for 146 yards and a touchdown as Denver dominates.
- Tennis:
  - 2008 US Open in Flushing Meadows, United States:
    - Men's singles final:
      (Switzerland) Roger Federer def. (United Kingdom) Andy Murray 6–2, 7–5, 6–2
      Federer wins 5th US Open title in a row and his 13th Grand Slam title.

== 7 September 2008 (Sunday) ==
- American football:
  - National Football League Week 1:
    - Baltimore Ravens 17, Cincinnati Bengals 10
      - The Ravens total 229 rushing yards, including a 38-yard rushing touchdown by rookie quarterback Joe Flacco.
    - New York Jets 20 Miami Dolphins 14
      - Brett Favre throws for two touchdowns in his first game for New York.
    - New England Patriots 17, Kansas City Chiefs 10
      - Tom Brady leaves the game with a knee injury in the first quarter, and the Patriots barely hold on without him. The Patriots later confirm that Brady will be out for the season.
    - Pittsburgh Steelers 38, Houston Texans 17
      - Willie Parker runs for 138 yards and three touchdowns, while Ben Roethlisberger completes 13 of 14 passes.
    - Tennessee Titans 17, Jacksonville Jaguars 10
      - The Titans defense sacks David Garrard seven times, intercepts him twice and holds the Jaguars to 33 rushing yards.
    - Atlanta Falcons 34, Detroit Lions 21
      - In his first game for Atlanta, running back Michael Turner rushes for a team-record 220 yards and two touchdowns.
    - Buffalo Bills 34, Seattle Seahawks 10
      - The Bills score touchdowns on a punt return and a fake punt.
    - New Orleans Saints 24, Tampa Bay Buccaneers 20
      - Drew Brees throws for 343 yards and three touchdowns; Saints linebacker Scott Fujita clinches the game with an interception.
    - Philadelphia Eagles 38, St. Louis Rams 3
      - Donovan McNabb passes for 361 yards and three touchdowns.
    - Dallas Cowboys 28, Cleveland Browns 10
      - The Cowboys roll up 487 yards against a soft Browns defense.
    - Carolina Panthers 26, San Diego Chargers 24
      - Jake Delhomme hits Dante Rosario with the game-winning touchdown on the last play.
    - Arizona Cardinals 23, San Francisco 49ers 13
      - J. T. O'Sullivan is responsible for three of the 49ers' five turnovers in his first game as the team's quarterback.
    - Chicago Bears 29, Indianapolis Colts 13
      - "Da Bears" spoil the opening of the Colts' new Lucas Oil Stadium, holding the Colts to 53 yards rushing while rookie running back Matt Forte runs for 123.
- Australian rules football:
  - AFL finals series
    - Qualifying Final 1 at Melbourne
      - **Geelong** 17.17 (119) – St Kilda 8.13 (61)
- Auto racing:
  - Formula One:
    - Belgian Grand Prix in Spa, Belgium
      - (1) Felipe Massa (Brazil) (2) Nick Heidfeld (Germany) (3) Lewis Hamilton (United Kingdom)
        Lewis Hamilton was demoted from 1st to 3rd place after receiving a 25-second penalty for an incident in the last few laps of the race.
  - IRL:
    - Peak Antifreeze & Motor Oil Indy 300 in Joliet, Illinois
      - (1) Hélio Castroneves (Brazil) (2) Scott Dixon (New Zealand) (3) Ryan Briscoe (Australia)
        - Castroneves, who started at the back of the grid in 28th and final position, edges out Dixon at the checkered flag by 0.0033 seconds, the second-closest finish in series history. No driver in IRL or its predecessors had won from so far back since 1946. Dixon's second-place finish is enough to secure the season title.
  - Sprint Cup:
    - Chevy Rock & Roll 400 in Richmond, Virginia
      - (1) Jimmie Johnson (California) (2) Tony Stewart (Indiana) (3) Denny Hamlin (Virginia)
    - The following drivers qualify for the Chase for the Sprint Cup (in order of seeding):
      - Kyle Busch (Nevada)
      - Carl Edwards (Missouri)
      - Jimmie Johnson (California)
      - Dale Earnhardt Jr. (North Carolina)
      - Clint Bowyer (Kansas)
      - Denny Hamlin (Virginia)
      - Jeff Burton (Virginia)
      - Tony Stewart (Indiana)
      - Greg Biffle (Washington (state))
      - Jeff Gordon (California)
      - Kevin Harvick (California)
      - Matt Kenseth (Wisconsin)
- Cycling – Track:
  - 2008 European Track Championships
    - Women's Scratch (U23): (1) Ellen van Dijk Netherlands & Elizabeth Armitstead United Kingdom, (3) Evgenia Romanyuta Russia
- Football (soccer):
  - 2010 FIFA World Cup qualification (CONMEBOL):
    - Chile 0 – 3 Brazil
  - 2010 FIFA World Cup qualification (CAF):
    (teams in bold qualify to the third round)
    - Group 2: Zimbabwe 0 – 0 Guinea
    - Group 3: Niger 3 – 1 Uganda
    - Group 3: **Benin** 3 – 2 Angola
    - Group 5: Lesotho 0 – 3 Gabon
    - Group 7: Mozambique 1 – 1 Ivory Coast
    - Group 7: Madagascar 1 – 0 Botswana
    - Group 8: Ethiopia – Morocco – Match postponed.
    - Group 10: Congo 1 – 0 Mali
    - Group 12: DR Congo 0 – 1 **Egypt**
- Golf:
  - PGA Tour:
    - BMW Championship in St. Louis, Missouri
      - Camilo Villegas (Colombia) becomes the 10th golfer this season to score his first career PGA Tour win, easing past Dudley Hart (United States) by two shots. Vijay Singh (Fiji) essentially clinches the FedEx Cup crown; he needs only to finish all four rounds at The Tour Championship in three weeks to secure the season title.
  - European Tour:
    - Omega European Masters in Switzerland
      - The European Tour also has a first-time winner this week, with Jean-François Lucquin (France) defeating 19-year-old Rory McIlroy (Northern Ireland) in a playoff.
- Hurling:
  - All-Ireland Senior Championship at Dublin:
    - **Kilkenny** 3–30 (39) – 1–13 (16) Waterford
- Motorcycle racing:
  - Superbike:
    - Donington Park Superbike World Championship round at North West Leicestershire, United Kingdom
    - Race 1 (1) Troy Bayliss (Australia) (2) Tom Sykes (United Kingdom) (3) Max Biaggi (Italy)
    - Race 2 (1) Ryuichi Kiyonari (Japan) (2) Cal Crutchlow (United Kingdom) (3) Troy Corser (Australia)
- Tennis:
  - 2008 US Open in Flushing Meadows, United States:
    - Women's singles final:
      (United States) **Serena Williams** def. (Serbia) Jelena Janković 6–4, 7–5
      - Williams returns to the #1 world ranking with her victory.
    - Women's doubles final:
      (Zimbabwe) **Cara Black** / (United States) **Liezel Huber** def. (United States) Lisa Raymond / (Australia) Samantha Stosur 6–3, 7–6(6)

== 6 September 2008 (Saturday) ==
- American college football:
  - NCAA AP Top 10:
    - (2) Georgia 56, Central Michigan 17
    - (3) Ohio State 26, Ohio 14
    - (4) Oklahoma 52, Cincinnati 26
    - (5) Florida 26, Miami 3
    - (6) Missouri 52, Southeast Missouri 3
    - Troy at (7) LSU — postponed to November 15 due to aftereffects of Hurricane Gustav
    - East Carolina 24, (8) West Virginia 3
    - (9) Auburn 27, Southern Miss 13
    - (10) Texas 42, UTEP 13
  - Other games:
    - Vanderbilt 24, (24) South Carolina 17
- Australian rules football:
  - AFL finals series
    - Elimination Final 1 at Adelaide
      - Adelaide 14.10 (94) – **Collingwood** 19.11 (125)
    - Elimination Final 2 at Sydney
      - **Sydney Swans** 17.8 (110) – North Melbourne 11.9 (75)
- Cricket:
  - Bangladesh in Australia:
    - 3rd ODI:Australia 198/5 (50 ov) beat Bangladesh 125 (29.5 ov) by 73 runs at Marrara Oval, Darwin, Australia
    **Australia win the series 3–0**.
- Cycling – Track:
  - 2008 European Track Championships
    - Women's points race (U23): (1) Ellen van Dijk Netherlands, (2) Elizabeth Armitstead Great Britain, (3) Aksana Papko Belarus
    - Women's individual pursuit (U23): (1) Vilija Sereikaitė Lithuania, (2) Ellen van Dijk Netherlands, (3) Joanna Rowsell Great Britain
- Football (soccer):
  - 2010 FIFA World Cup qualification (UEFA):
    - Group 1: Hungary 0 – 0 Denmark
    - Group 1: Malta 0 – 4 Portugal
    - Group 1: Albania 0 – 0 Sweden
    - Group 2: Moldova 1 – 2 Latvia
    - Group 2: Israel 2 – 2 Switzerland
    - Group 2: Luxembourg 0 – 3 Greece
    - Group 3: Poland 1 – 1 Slovenia
    - Group 3: Slovakia 2 – 1 Northern Ireland
    - Group 4: Wales 1 – 0 Azerbaijan
    - Group 4: Liechtenstein 0 – 6 Germany
    - Group 5: Armenia 0 – 2 Turkey
    - Group 5: Belgium 3 – 2 Estonia
    - Group 5: Spain 1 – 0 Bosnia and Herzegovina
    - Group 6: Ukraine 1 – 0 Belarus
    - Group 6: Andorra 0 – 2 England
    - Group 6: Croatia 3 – 0 Kazakhstan
    - Group 7: Romania 0 – 3 Lithuania
    - Group 7: Serbia 2 – 0 Faroe Islands
    - Group 7: Austria 3 – 1 France
    - Group 8: Georgia 1 – 2 Republic of Ireland
      - Match played in Mainz, Germany, because of the political situation in Georgia.
    - Group 8: Cyprus 1 – 2 Italy
    - Group 8: Montenegro 2 – 2 Bulgaria
    - Group 9: North Macedonia 1 – 0 Scotland
    - Group 9: Norway 2 – 2 Iceland
  - 2010 FIFA World Cup qualification (CONMEBOL):
    - Argentina 1 – 1 Paraguay
    - Colombia 0 – 1 Uruguay
    - Ecuador 3 – 1 Bolivia
    - Peru 1 – 0 Venezuela
  - 2010 FIFA World Cup qualification (CAF):
    (teams in bold qualify to the third round)
    - Group 1: Mauritius 1 – 4 Tanzania
    - Group 1: Cape Verde 1 – 2 **Cameroon**
    - Group 2: Kenya 1 – 0 Namibia
    - Group 4: Sierra Leone 2 – 1 Equatorial Guinea
    - Group 4: South Africa 0 – 1 **Nigeria**
    - Group 6: Gambia 3 – 0 Liberia
    - Group 8: Mauritania 0 – 1 **Rwanda**
    - Group 9: Burkina Faso 0 – 0 Tunisia
    - Group 9: Seychelles 1 – 2 Burundi
    - Group 10: Sudan 1 – 2 Chad
  - 2010 FIFA World Cup qualification (CONCACAF):
    - Group 1: Trinidad and Tobago 1 – 1 Guatemala
    - Group 1: Cuba 0 – 1 United States
    - Group 2: Mexico 3 – 0 Jamaica
    - Group 2: Canada 1 – 2 Honduras
    - Group 3: El Salvador 5 – 0 Haiti
    - Group 3: Costa Rica 7 – 0 Suriname
  - 2010 FIFA World Cup qualification (AFC):
    - Group A: Bahrain 2 – 3 Japan
    - Group A: Qatar 3 – 0 Uzbekistan
    - Group B: Saudi Arabia 1 – 1 Iran
    - Group B: United Arab Emirates 1 – 2 North Korea
  - 2010 FIFA World Cup qualification (OFC):
    - New Caledonia 1 – 3 New Zealand
    - Fiji 2 – 0 Vanuatu
    New Zealand win the Oceania group and advance to a play off match against the 5th ranked team in AFC. (fifa.com)

== 5 September 2008 (Friday) ==
- Australian rules football:
  - AFL finals series: Qualifying Final 2 at Melbourne
    - Hawthorn 18.19 (127) – Western Bulldogs 11.10 (76)
- Football (soccer):
  - 2010 FIFA World Cup qualification (CAF):
    - Group 5: Libya 1 – 0 Ghana
    - Group 6: Algeria 3 – 2 Senegal
    - Group 12: Djibouti 0 – 3 Malawi
- Tennis:
  - 2008 US Open in Flushing Meadows, United States:
    - Men's doubles final:

(United States) Bob Bryan / (United States) Mike Bryan def. (Czech Republic) Lukáš Dlouhý / (India) Leander Paes, 7–6(5), 7–6(10)

== 4 September 2008 (Thursday) ==
- American football:
  - National Football League Week 1 Kickoff Game:
    - New York Giants 16, Washington Redskins 7
      - New Redskins head coach Jim Zorn sticks with a conservative offense after falling behind 16–0 and eventually runs out of time. Plaxico Burress catches 10 passes for 133 yards, while Brandon Jacobs adds 116 yards on the ground for the Giants.
    - Quarterback Daunte Culpepper announces his retirement. (ESPN.com)
    - The NFL announces it will allow the Pro Bowl receiver formerly known as Chad Johnson to use his new legal name, Chad Ocho Cinco, on his uniform. (Associated Press)
- Tennis:
  - 2008 US Open in Flushing Meadows, United States:
    - Mixed doubles final:

(Zimbabwe) Cara Black / (India) Leander Paes def. (United States) Liezel Huber / (United Kingdom) Jamie Murray, 7–6(6), 6–4

== 3 September 2008 (Wednesday) ==
- Basketball:
  - The NBA franchise formerly known as the Seattle SuperSonics officially announces its new name as the Oklahoma City Thunder.
- Cricket:
  - Bangladesh in Australia:
    - 2nd ODI: Australia 118/2 (22.4 ov) beat Bangladesh 117 (36.1 ov) by 8 wickets
    Australia lead the 3-match series 2–0
  - South Africa in England:
    - 5th ODI: South Africa 6/1 (3 ov) vs England-No result
    England win the series 4–0
- Cycling – Track:
  - 2008 European Track Championships
    - Women's Omnium: (1) Elena Tchalykh Russia, (2) Ellen van Dijk Netherlands, (3) Anastasia Tchulkova Russia
- Rugby union:
  - New Zealand 101–14 Samoa at New Plymouth, New Zealand

== 1 September 2008 (Monday) ==
- Football (soccer): An astonishing last day of the summer transfer window in the Premier League:
  - It is announced that the Abu Dhabi United Group, an investment vehicle of the Abu Dhabi royal family, have agreed to buy Manchester City F.C. from former Thai Prime Minister Thaksin Shinawatra for approximately £200 million, and have made an unlimited amount of money available to make City one of the leading teams in the Premiership.
  - Manchester City then agree a deal with Tottenham Hotspur to sign Bulgarian striker Dimitar Berbatov for a fee of over £30 million. Berbatov, however, had always made it plain that he wished to sign for Manchester United in order to play in the Champions League, and he did so at the end of the day for a record fee of £30.75 million.
  - City then succeeded in signing Robinho from Real Madrid for a new record €42 million (£32.5 million) — as recently as Sunday it was expected that Robinho would sign for Chelsea, but relations between Madrid and the London club cooled markedly.
