= 2008 St Helens R.F.C. season =

English rugby league club season

The 2008 St Helens R.F.C. season was the 136th in the club's history. They competed in Super League XIII as well as the 2008 Challenge Cup tournament.

== 2008 Fixtures/Results ==
Competition	Round	Opposition	Result	Score	Home/Away	Venue	Attendance	Date
Super League XIII	1	Hull Kingston Rovers	Loss	22-24	Away	Craven Park	8,713	10/02/2008
Super League XIII	2	Warrington Wolves	Win	30-22	Home	Knowsley Road	13,396	15/02/2008
Super League XIII	3	Bradford Bulls	Win	22-16	Away	Odsal	10,756	22/02/2008
Super League XIII	4	Wakefield Trinity Wildcats	Win	34-30	Home	Knowsley Road	10,777	02/03/2008
Super League XIII	5	Hull	Win	30-29	Home	Knowsley Road	10,204	07/03/2008
Super League XIII	6	Catalans Dragons	Loss	10-24	Away	Stade Gilbert Brutus	7,828	15/03/2008
Super League XIII	7	Wigan Warriors	Win	46-10	Home	Knowsley Road	17,500	21/03/2008
Super League XIII	8	Huddersfield Giants	Loss	26-28	Away	Galpharm Stadium	7,131	24/03/2008
Super League XIII	9	Leeds Rhinos	Loss	10-14	Home	Knowsley Road	11,188	28/03/2008
Super League XIII	10	Castleford Tigers	Loss	24-30	Away	The Jungle	7,529	06/04/2008
Super League XIII	11	Harlequins RL	Win	58-12	Home	Knowsley Road	8,533	11/04/2008
Challenge Cup	Rnd 4	London Skolars	Win	56-0	Home	Knowsley Road	3,258	20/04/2008
Super League XIII	12	Warrington Wolves	Win	30-22	Away	Halliwell Jones Stadium	13,024	25/04/2008
Super League XIII	13	Wigan Warriors	Win	57-16	Cardiff	Millennium Stadium	32,516	04/05/2008
Challenge Cup	Rnd 5	Warrington Wolves	Win	40-34	Home	Knowsley Road	8,570	10/05/2008
Super League XIII	14	Catalans Dragons	Win	28-10	Home	Knowsley Road	8,550	17/05/2008
Super League XIII	15	Hull	Win	8-16	Away	KC Stadium	14,653	25/05/2008
Challenge Cup	QtrFinal	Hull Kingston Rovers	Win	18-24	Away	Craven Park	8,304	01/06/2008
Super League XIII	16	Hull Kingston Rovers	Win	52-10	Home	Knowsley Road	8,404	06/06/2008
Super League XIII	17	Bradford Bulls	Win	58-20	Home	Knowsley Road	9,009	13/06/2008
Super League XIII	18	Leeds Rhinos	Win	12-26	Away	Headingley Carnegie Stadium	18,303	20/06/2008
Super League XIII	18	Huddersfield Giants	Win	46-16	Home	Knowsley Road	8,597	29/06/2008
Super League XIII	20	Harlequins RL	Win	0-54	Away	Twickenham Stoop	4,276	05/07/2008
Super League XIII	21	Castleford Tigers	Win	68-12	Home	Knowsley Road	8,430	11/07/2008
Super League XIII	21	Wigan Warriors	Win	12-46	Away	JJB Stadium	19,958	18/07/2008
Challenge Cup	Semi-Final	Leeds Rhinos	Win	26-16	Huddersfield	Galpharm Stadium	19,842	26/07/2008
Super League XIII	22	Wakefield Trinity Wildcats	Win	10-42	Away	Belle Vue	5,781	03/08/2008
Super League XIII	24	Warrington Wolves	Win	17-16	Home	Knowsley Road	10,258	08/08/2008
Super League XIII	25	Harlequins RL	Win	16-32	Away	Twickenham Stoop	3,269	17/08/2008
Super League XIII	26	Huddersfield Giants	Win	22-40	Away	Galpharm Stadium	6,150	24/08/2008
Challenge Cup	Final	Hull F.C.	Win	16-28	Away	Wembley Stadium	82,821	30/08/2008
Super League XIII	27	Wigan Warriors	Draw	16-16	Home	Knowsley Road	14,113	05/09/2008
Super League XIII Playoffs	Week 2	Leeds Rhinos	Win	38-10	Home	Knowsley Road	11,407	19/09/2008
Super League XIII Playoffs	Grand Final	Leeds Rhinos	Loss	16-24	Neutral	Old Trafford	68,810	04/10/2008

Super League XIII
Pos	Team	Pld	W	D	L	PF	PA	PD	Pts	Qualification
1	St. Helens (L)	27	21	1	5	940	457	+483	43	Semi-final
2	Leeds Rhinos (C)	27	21	0	6	863	413	+450	42	Semi-final
3	Catalans Dragons	27	16	2	9	694	625	+69	34	Elimination semi-finals
4	Wigan Warriors	27	13	3	11	648	698	−50	29	Elimination semi-finals
5	Bradford Bulls	27	14	0	13	705	625	+80	28	Elimination semi-finals
6	Warrington Wolves	27	14	0	13	690	713	−23	28	Elimination semi-finals
7	Hull Kingston Rovers	27	11	1	15	564	713	−149	23	
8	Wakefield Trinity Wildcats	27	11	0	16	574	760	−186	22	
9	Harlequins	27	11	0	16	569	763	−194	22	
10	Huddersfield Giants	27	10	1	16	638	681	−43	21	
11	Hull F.C.	27	8	1	18	538	699	−161	17	
12	Castleford Tigers	27	7	1	19	593	869	−276	15	

Source: superleague.co.uk
Rules for classification: 1st on competition points; 2nd on match points difference.
Competition points: for win = 2; for draw = 1; for loss = 0.
(C) Champions; (L) League Leaders' Shield Winners
