= Games behind =

Sports league statistic

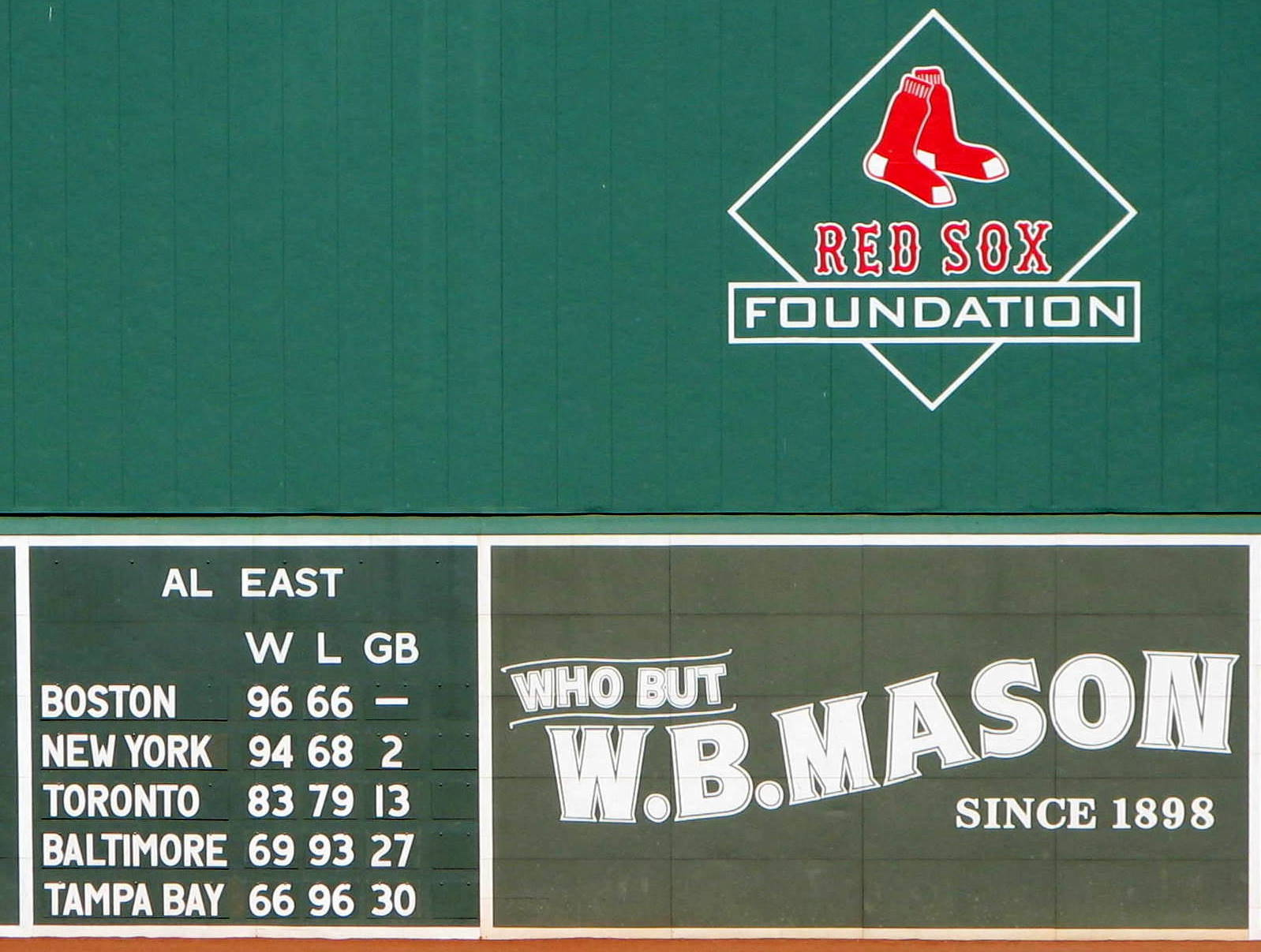
A partial view of the Green Monster at Fenway Park during the 2007 MLB season, with the final regular season standings for the American League East division, including a "GB" column

In some North American sports, the phrase games behind or games back (often abbreviated GB) refers to a common way to reflect the gap between a leading team and another team in a sports league, conference, or division.

== Example ==
In the standings below from the 1994 Major League Baseball season, the Atlanta Braves are six games behind the Montreal Expos. Atlanta would have to win six games, and Montreal would have to lose six games, to tie for first. The leading team is by definition zero games behind itself, and this is indicated in the standings with a dash, not a zero.

NL East
Team	W	L	Pct.	GB	Home	Road
Montreal Expos	74	40	.649	—	32‍–‍20	42‍–‍20
Atlanta Braves	68	46	.596	6	31‍–‍24	37‍–‍22
New York Mets	55	58	.487	18½	23‍–‍30	32‍–‍28
Philadelphia Phillies	54	61	.470	20½	34‍–‍26	20‍–‍35
Florida Marlins	51	64	.443	23½	25‍–‍34	26‍–‍30

== Computing games behind ==
Games behind is calculated by using either of the following formulas, in which Team A is a leading team, and Team B is a trailing team. Example math in this section uses the above standings, with Montreal as Team A and Atlanta as Team B.

$$\text{Games Behind} = \frac{(\text{Team A's wins – Team A's losses}) - (\text{Team B's wins – Team B's losses})}{2}$$

$$\text{Games Behind} = \frac{(\text{74 – 40}) - (\text{68 – 46})}{2} = \frac{\text{34 – 22}}{2} = \frac{12}{2} = 6$$

Alternately:

$$\text{Games Behind} = \frac{(\text{Team A's wins – Team B's wins}) + (\text{Team B's losses – Team A's losses})}{2}$$

$$\text{Games Behind} = \frac{(\text{74 – 68}) + (\text{46 – 40})}{2} = \frac{\text{6 + 6}}{2} = \frac{12}{2} = 6$$

Notes:

- It can alternately be said that Montreal is six games ahead of Atlanta.
- A games behind situation can change rapidly when two teams contesting for the lead play each other. For example, Atlanta could cut Montreal's lead in half (to three games) by sweeping a three-game head-to-head series.
- The leading team, in terms of games behind, is the team with the best won–loss difference. This is not always the team with the most wins. For example, a team with an 80–70 record (10 more wins than losses) would be one game behind a team with a 79–67 record (12 more wins than losses).

== Anomalies ==
A games behind calculation can be misleading when attempting to compare teams that have played an unequal number of games. This is because the games behind calculation simply computes the difference between wins and losses for each team, and then averages those two numbers. Essentially, this treats each unplayed game as being a tie (i.e. 1/2 win and a 1/2 loss).

In an extreme example, attempting to compare the records of the 2007 New England Patriots (16–0; 1.000 winning percentage) and the 1972 Detroit Tigers (86–70; .551 winning percentage) finds that the teams are equivalent on a games behind calculation, as each team won 16 more games than it lost. However, the Tigers played 140 more games than the Patriots. The Patriots' 140 "unplayed" games are essentially treated as 70–70; indeed, if the 16–0 Patriots had 70 more wins and 70 more losses, their 86–70 record would match that of the Tigers.

In reality, teams in an actual sports league can have an unequal number of games played due to various scheduling anomalies, postponements, or cancellations. This can result in:

- Two teams with different winning percentages may be tied in terms of games behind. For example, Team A at 6–4 would be tied with Team B at 4–2, in terms of games behind; however, Team B has the better winning percentage, at .667 compared to .600 for Team A.
- A team with a lower winning percentage may lead (in terms of games behind) a team with a higher winning percentage. For example, Team A at 6–4 would lead Team B at 2–1 by a half-game when calculating games behind. However, Team B has the better winning percentage at .667, compared to .600 for Team A.

Such conditions have occurred multiple times in major sports leagues, examples include:

Major League Baseball (MLB)
Date	League and Division	Teams	W–L	Win Pct.	GB	Ref.
June 11, 1901	NL	New York Giants	19–14	.576	1/2	
June 11, 1901	NL	Pittsburgh Pirates	23–17	.575	—	
April 22, 1913	NL	Philadelphia Phillies	4–1	.800	1	
April 22, 1913	NL	Pittsburgh Pirates	7–2	.778	—	
May 27, 1940	NL	Brooklyn Dodgers	20–8	.714	1/2	
May 27, 1940	NL	Cincinnati Reds	22–9	.710	—	
April 27, 1972	AL West	Minnesota Twins	5–2	.714	1/2	
April 27, 1972	AL West	Chicago White Sox	7–3	.700	—	
April 13, 1983	NL East	St. Louis Cardinals	3–1	.750	1/2	
April 13, 1983	NL East	Pittsburgh Pirates	5–2	.714	—	
April 24, 1983	AL West	Kansas City Royals	8–5	.615	1/2	
April 24, 1983	AL West	California Angels	11–7	.611	—	
May 15, 1992	AL East	Baltimore Orioles	23–11	.676	1/2	
May 15, 1992	AL East	Toronto Blue Jays	25–12	.676	—	
May 17, 2018	AL East	New York Yankees	28–13	.683	1/2	
May 17, 2018	AL East	Boston Red Sox	30–14	.682	—	
August 24, 2020	AL East	New York Yankees	16–9	.640	1/2	
August 24, 2020	AL East	Tampa Bay Rays	19–11	.633	—	

National Basketball Association (NBA)
Date	Conference or Division	Teams	W–L	Win Pct.	GB	Ref.
December 20, 1949	Central Division	Rochester Royals	14–8	.636	1/2	
December 20, 1949	Central Division	Chicago Stags	17–10	.630	—	
December 28, 1983	Pacific Division	Los Angeles Lakers	19–9	.679	1/2	
December 28, 1983	Pacific Division	Portland Trail Blazers	21–10	.677	—	
December 28, 2018	Eastern Conference	Milwaukee Bucks	24–10	.706	1/2	
December 28, 2018	Eastern Conference	Toronto Raptors	26–11	.703	—	
January 4, 2024	Western Conference	Oklahoma City Thunder	23–10	.697	1/2	
January 4, 2024	Western Conference	Denver Nuggets	25–11	.694	—	
January 28, 2024	Western Conference	Los Angeles Clippers	30–14	.682	1/2	
January 28, 2024	Western Conference	Denver Nuggets	32–15	.681	—	
January 13, 2025	Eastern Conference	Toronto Raptors	9–31	.225	1	
January 13, 2025	Eastern Conference	Charlotte Hornets	8–28	.222	—	
January 17, 2025	Western Conference	New Orleans Pelicans	11–32	.256	1/2	
January 17, 2025	Western Conference	Utah Jazz	10–30	.250	—	
November 15, 2025	Western Conference	Houston Rockets	8–3	.727	1/2	
November 15, 2025	Western Conference	Los Angeles Lakers	10–4	.714	—	
January 23, 2026	Eastern Conference	Indiana Pacers	11–35	.239	1/2	
January 23, 2026	Eastern Conference	Washington Wizards	10–33	.233	—	

Leagues generally use winning percentage to order teams in official standings. However, standings appearing in newspapers or online may order teams based on games behind.

== Usage ==
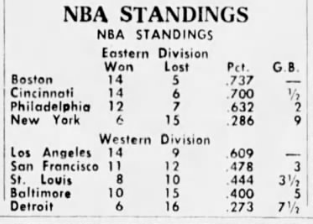
NBA standings in November 1965 as published in The Minneapolis Star

The games behind calculation is often used in professional baseball and basketball, where tie games are not permitted. (Note: Historically, various MLB games have ended in a tie, as recently as 2016; such games are excluded from league standings, while statistics for individual players are counted.) Standings for these sports appearing in print or online during a season usually will have teams ordered by winning percentages, with a "GB" column provided as a convenience to the reader. Games behind is used less often in American football, where ties are possible but relatively uncommon. Games behind is rarely used in ice hockey and soccer, where ties are or were traditionally common and standings points are typically used.

=== Major League Baseball ===
Major League Baseball (MLB) defines games behind as "the average of the differences between the leading team wins and the trailing team wins, and the leading teams losses and the trailing team losses." A games behind column almost always appears in MLB standings for each five-team division.

==== Wild card race ====
In the 1994 MLB season, the American League and National League each split into three divisions, and each added a wild card team to the playoffs. Following this change, it became common for the media to publish an additional set of standings for the wild card race. It included all teams from a league, with the exception of the division leaders, and games behind was calculated with respect to the team with the highest standing in the wild card race.

In the 2012 MLB season, both leagues added a second wild card team, and a third wild card team was added for each league starting with the 2022 MLB season. Games behind in the wild card race is now calculated with respect to the final wild card position. MLB's website distinguishes this statistic as wild card games behind, abbreviated WCGB. Unless all wild card qualifying teams are tied, this results in some teams being shown as some number of "games ahead" of the final qualifier, indicated by a plus sign ("+") in the standings. For example, see the 2012 NL Wild Card standings, which shows the Atlanta Braves six games ahead of the St. Louis Cardinals, and the 2022 AL Wild Card standings, which shows the Toronto Blue Jays and Seattle Mariners six games and four games, respectively, ahead of the Tampa Bay Rays.

=== National Basketball Association ===
National Basketball Association (NBA) standings typically report games behind within each five-team division. However, it is not as closely followed as in baseball, because more teams qualify for the NBA playoffs, and the divisional statistics are not as important for playoff qualification. Sometimes, especially nearing the end of the regular season, games behind will be given with respect to the sixth through tenth positions in the Eastern Conference and Western Conference, due to the significance of the seeds in relation with the NBA’s play-in tournament.

=== National Football League ===
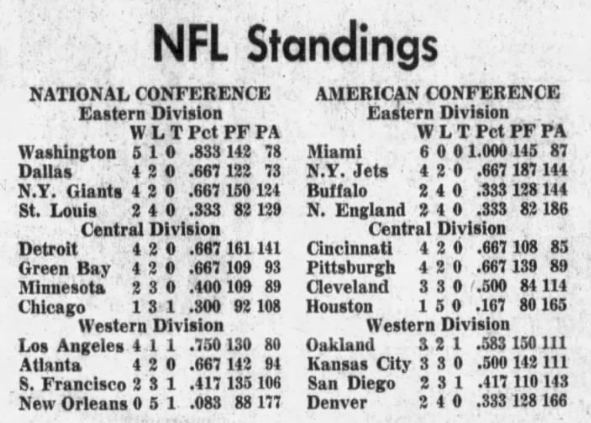
NFL standings in October 1972 as published in the Tampa Bay Times

National Football League (NFL) standings sometimes report games behind, although the statistic is not emphasized; winning percentage is used, computed from each team's win–loss–tie record. This is especially true since the introduction of the bye week in 1990, exacerbating differences in the number of games that teams have played at various points in time, in addition to the possibility of tied games, which while highly uncommon since the introduction of overtime in the regular season starting in 1974 do still occur on occasion. Games behind is omitted from standings on the NFL's website and is absent from most published standings.

=== Other sports ===
The games behind statistic is eschewed in sports where tie games are traditionally common, such as ice hockey and soccer. Leagues in these sports typically rank teams by awarding a certain number of points for each win or tie. In competitions where ties have been abolished (especially in hockey), points are still awarded for an "overtime loss" such that they are often (but not always) the same value as ties previously were, while in soccer the traditional value of two points for a win has been replaced by three points, while ties are still worth one point. These changes would make calculating a "games behind" statistic even more complicated compared to if it were to be used under the traditional system in which a tie was effectively worth a "half-win."

The Canadian Football League (CFL) also does not use games behind, and awards standings points. However, unlike leagues such as the National Hockey League (NHL), the CFL does not award points for overtime losses, although it experimented with such a system in the early 21st century. Also, unlike most other football codes that award three points for a win, the CFL still uses the traditional values of two points for a win and one for a tie. Therefore, a tie in the CFL is still effectively worth a "half-win" as it always has been in Canadian football (and also as it has been in the NFL since 1972).

=== Related usage ===
Teams are sometimes referred to as being over or under "five hundred", in comparison to a winning percentage of .500 (percentage being a misnomer in the usual North American expression; .500 meaning 50% in this context). The calculation for this is simple subtraction. For example, a team at 29–19 is "10 games over five hundred", as they could lose their next 10 games and still have a .500 record, while a team at 12–17 would be "five games under five hundred", as the quickest they could reach .500 would be by winning their next five games. "Above" and "below" can be substituted for "over" and "under", respectively.

== See also ==
- Magic number (sports), the number of wins needed to clinch a championship
