= Halton Stadium =

Sports stadium in Widnes

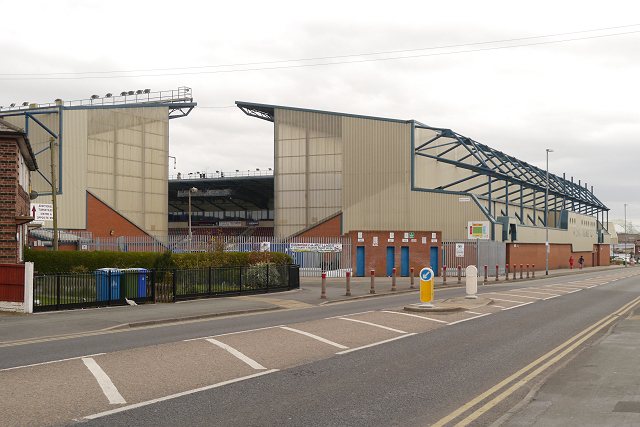
- The stadium in 2013
- Interactive map of Halton Stadium
- Full name: Halton Stadium
- Location: Lowerhouse Lane; Widnes; Cheshire; WA8 7DZ
- Coordinates: 53°21′57″N 2°44′18″W
- Owner: Halton Borough Council
- Capacity: 13,350
- Surface: Artificial turf
- Scoreboard: Yes (Electronic LED Display)

Construction
- Built: Re-opened 1997
- Opened: 12 October 1895
- Renovated: 2 November 1997
- Expanded: 11 September 2005

Tenants
- Widnes Vikings; Widnes Football Club (2012–2025); Widnes Town Football Club (2026–present); Halton Spartans (2014–2021)

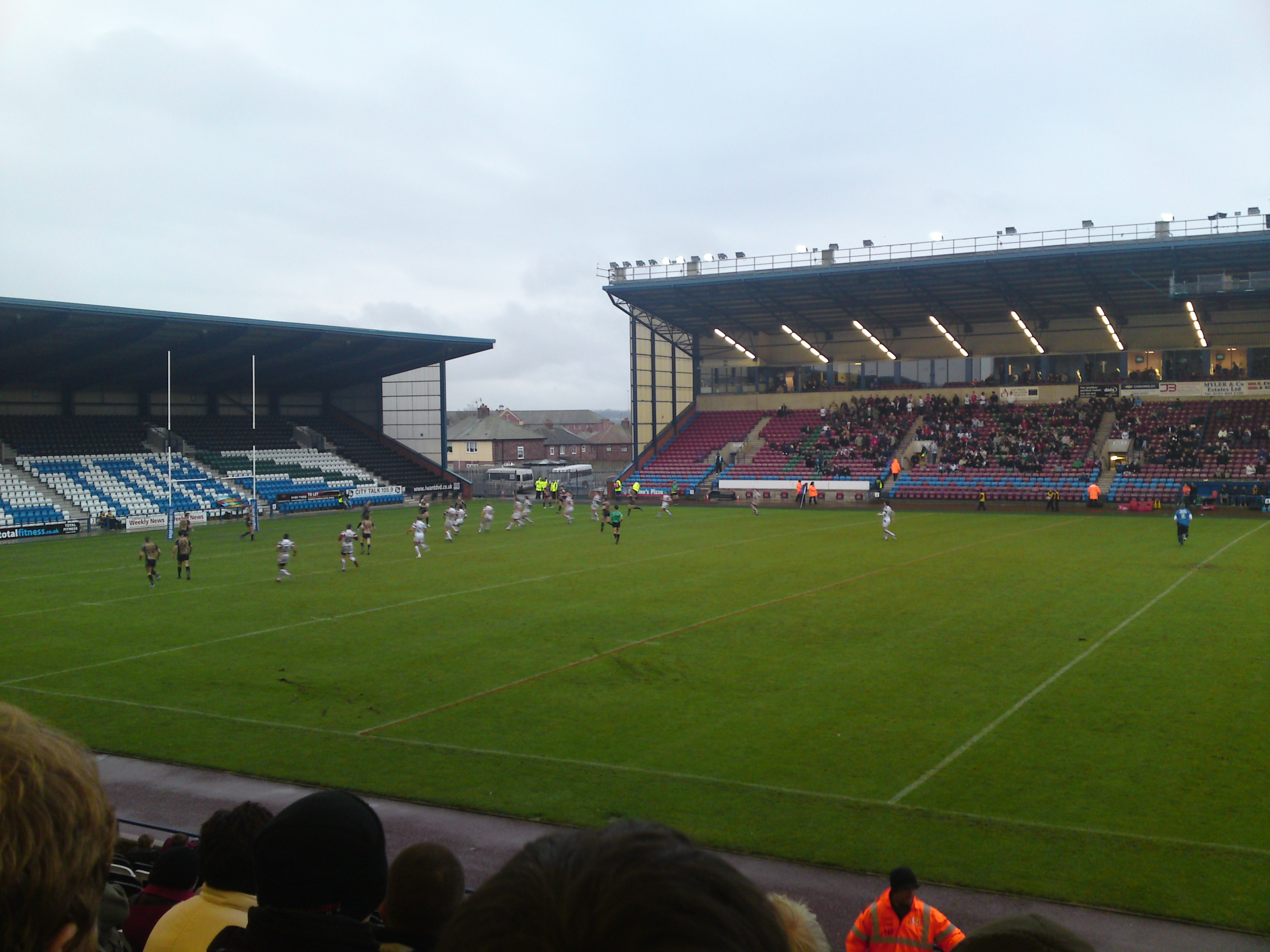
The interior of the DCBL Stadium in 2010

The Halton Stadium (currently known as the DCBL Stadium for sponsorship reasons) is a multi-purpose stadium in Widnes, Cheshire, England. The stadium is all seater and has a total capacity of 13,350.

It is the home of Rugby League side Widnes Vikings of the Championship and previously hosted football team Widnes Football Club of the Northern Premier League and the American football side Halton Spartans of the BAFA National Leagues. The stadium will host newly formed Widnes Town Football Club

During the 2011 Super League Season, St. Helens played their home games at the stadium. From 2013 to 2018 the Stadium was home to Everton Ladies and Liverpool Ladies. Since 2013 the stadium has also been used as the venue for the Drum Corps United Kingdom "British Drum Corps Championships".

== History ==
=== Naughton Park ===
Widnes Football Club had a number of grounds before settling at Lowerhouse Lane in 1884/85 on a site a few hundred yards north of the current location. That land was leased on behalf of the rugby organisation by Widnes Cricket Club but, to coincide with the breakaway from the Rugby Football Union in 1895, Widnes F.C. obtained a lease for land on which they laid out a new ground (the Naughton Park/Halton Stadium site). The first game on the new field was against Liversedge on 12 October 1895.

In the late 1920s, it was proposed that the land would be compulsorily purchased to make way for a new council housing scheme. After much lobbying the club were finally given an option to purchase the site for the not inconsiderable sum of £3,250.

Club secretary Tom Naughton was instrumental in raising the necessary funds but before the formal completion of the purchase in 1932 he died in a car crash, leading to the ground being renamed in his honour.

During the 1978 Kangaroo tour, Widnes defeated Australia at Naughton Park before a crowd of 12,202.

Naughton Park stadium was owned by Widnes F.C. (later Widnes RLFC Ltd) but when financial difficulties set in they sold the ground to Halton Borough Council in 1995.

Halton Borough Council in partnership with Widnes Vikings agreed to build a new stadium on the site of Naughton Park. This stadium would provide a multi-purpose complex including a social club, conference facilities, recreational facilities and catering/function facilities. Re-development began in 1996, but Widnes Vikings continued to play fixtures at the ground with a reduced capacity. The club played its final game at Naughton Park in July 1997 against Featherstone Rovers, and re-located to Canal Street in Runcorn for the remainder of the season.

=== Halton Stadium ===
The new stadium was officially opened on 2 November 1997 and consisted of South Stand with 3,400 capacity two function suites, social club and 30 executive boxes overlooking the pitch and the North Stand which had capacity for 4,400 fans.

On 11 November 1997 Everton Reserves played their first match in their new home as more than 5,000 fans attended leading to the kick-off being delayed by half an hour to allow the large crowd in. Although they were not treated to the best of games Leeds eventually found the breakthrough with 10 minutes to go when Jimmy Floyd Hasselbaink cut inside two defenders and curled his right foot shot past the dive of John O'Toole.

On 29 January 1999 the Widnes RLFC's remaining 40% share in the ground was sold to the council when they ran into financial difficulties.

In 1999 the Halton Stadium became The AutoQuest Stadium when the local car dealership signed sponsorship naming rights.

On 8 October 1999 the new West stand was officially opened by Tessa Sanderson CBE with the benefit of a Sport England Lottery grant the facilities included gym, crèche, café and a national table tennis Centre of excellence along with an extra 3,200 spectator seating.

In 2000, Runcorn F.C. sold their Canal Street ground and moved to the Halton Stadium. The club renamed itself Runcorn F.C. Halton to reflect its new location.

AutoQuest's sponsorship ended in 2001 and the stadium became known as the Halton Stadium.

On 27 November 2002 Runcorn hosted 3rd division Bristol Rovers in an FA Cup 1st round replay in front of 2,444 fans despite taking their league opponents to extra time they were knocked out 3–1.

The 2002/03 season was to be Everton Reserves final season at the Halton Stadium as they moved to Haig Avenue in Southport.

In 2004 the Stadium was selected to host a Challenge cup semi final as 11,175 fans watched as Wigan Warriors were victorious 30–18 against the Warrington Wolves.

In 2005 the East Stand was completed making the Halton Stadium a complete four-stand all seater stadium. Runcorn F.C.'s precarious financial state caused them to move out of the Halton Stadium and into Valerie Park.

In December 2007 a sponsorship agreement was made with Stobart Group Limited and the stadium was renamed Stobart Stadium Halton. In February 2008 the North stand seats were changed to spell out Vikings, West stand seats are sponsored by Stobart and East stand seats are sponsored by Halton Borough Council as part of the stadium sponsorship deal.

The Widnes Rugby League Museum was opened in 2007.

In 2008 the Stadium hosted Wigan Warriors home playoff fixture verses Bradford Bulls after they were refused usage of their home ground by the stadiums owner Dave Whelan

In 2009 the Stadium hosted a rematch of the 2004 Challenge Cup Semi final and this time 12,975 fans watched as Warrington Wolves secured revenge in a 39–26 victory over Wigan Warriors.

In 2010 12,265 fans attended the Challenge Cup Semi final as Warrington Wolves cruised to victory 54-12 versus Catalans Dragons.

The stadium was a temporary home to St. Helens during the 2011 season, as Langtree Park only opened for use in time for the 2012 season.

At the end of the 2011 season the stadium became the first in England to install a fully artificial 3G pitch

In 2013 The Stadium failed to be selected as a Rugby League World Cup venue due to the 3G pitch not being sanctioned for international competition. The USA team based themselves at the Stadium during their run to the quarter finals in the competition.

In 2013 local businessman Peter Littler signed a naming rights sponsorship deal as the Stadium became the Select Security Stadium.

Since 2013 the Stadium has been the host venue for the British Drum Corps Championships which are held each September. The Championships feature the top UK Marching Bands and is organised by Drum Corps United Kingdom - www.dcuk.org.uk

On Sunday 18 June 2017 a sellout 14,000 crowd were entertained by Elton John at the Stadium with his Wonderful Crazy Night Tour.

In October 2018 the 3G pitch was relaid after seven years of matches, community use and events. The new 3G pitch was installed with green rubber crumb and the perimeter touchlines permanently incorporated into the surface to improve the appearance of the pitch for spectators and the TV audience.

In November 2019 DCBL secured the naming rights to the DCBL Stadium Halton.

On Saturday 2 July 2022 a 7,000 crowd were entertained by Bryan Adams and Widnes-born Spice Girl Mel C at the Stadium with his "So happy it hurts" tour.

On Tuesday 18 April 2023, the DCBL Stadium hosted the final of the Liverpool Senior Cup where Marine beat Runcorn Linnets 4-3 on penalties after a 0-0 draw. The attendance of the game was 2,561.

== Facilities ==
The stadium is segmented into four stands, each with different seating capacities and amenities:

- south stand (3,400 seats) – 30 executive suites, two function suites with capacity for 500 guests, social club, and club shop
- east stand (2,350 seats) – Widnes Rugby League museum
- west stand (3,200 seats) – National Table Tennis Centre of Excellence, gym, crèche, café, and Marquee Suite with capacity for 500 guests
- north stand (4,400 seats) – Widnes Vikings Performance Hub with gym, offices and treatment Centre

== Rugby League Club Matches ==
The Halton Stadium has played host to various high-profile club matches.

| Game | Date | Result | Attendance | Notes |
|---|---|---|---|---|
| 1 | 12 October 2002 | Huddersfield Giants def. Leigh Centurions 38–16 | 9,051 | Northern Ford Premiership Grand Final |
| 2 | 5 October 2003 | Salford City Reds def. Leigh Centurions 31–14 | 9,186 | 2003 Rugby League National Leagues Grand Final |
| 3 | 25 April 2004 | Wigan Warriors def. Warrington Wolves 30–18 | 11,175 | 2004 Challenge Cup Semi-Final |
| 4 | 10 October 2004 | Leigh Centurions def. Whitehaven RLFC 32–16 | 11,005 | 2004 Rugby League National Leagues Grand Final |
| 5 | 9 October 2005 | Castleford Tigers def. Whitehaven RLFC 36–8 | 13,300 | 2005 Rugby League National Leagues Grand Final |
| 6 | 12 September 2008 | Wigan Warriors def. Bradford Bulls 30–14 | 6,806 | 2008 Super League play-off |
| 7 | 8 August 2009 | Warrington Wolves def. Wigan Warriors 39–26 | 12,975 | 2009 Challenge Cup Semi-Final |
| 8 | 8 August 2010 | Warrington Wolves def. Catalans Dragons 54–12 | 12,265 | 2010 Challenge Cup Semi-Final |

== Rugby League Test Matches ==
List of rugby league test matches played at the Halton Stadium.

| Test# | Date | Result | Attendance | Notes |
|---|---|---|---|---|
| 1 | 15 January 1978 | Wales def. France 29–7 | 9,502 | 1978 European Rugby League Championship |
| 2 | 16 March 1979 | England def. Wales 15–7 | 5,099 | 1979 European Rugby League Championship |
| 3 | 26 January 1980 | France def. Wales 21–7 | 2,804 | 1980 European Rugby League Championship |
| 4 | 19 June 1998 | England def. Wales 15–12 | 5,154 | International Friendly |
| 1 | 12 November 2000 | Wales def. Papua New Guinea 13–12 | 5,211 | 2000 Rugby League World Cup Quarter-final 3 |
| 5 | 12 November 2006 | England def. Tonga 32–14 | 3,000 | 2006 Federation Shield Final |
| 6 | 9 November 2007 | Samoa def. United States 42–10 | 753 | 2008 Rugby League World Cup qualifying |
| 7 | 9 November 2007 | Lebanon def. Wales 50–26 | 753 | 2008 Rugby League World Cup qualifying |

== Rugby League Tour Matches ==
Other than Widnes club games, the stadium also saw Widnes play host to various international touring teams from 1907 to 1990. Widnes' 11–10 win over Australia in 1978 was their only win over the touring Kangaroos. It also remains (as of 2017) the last time a British club or county side has defeated Australia in any match.

| Game | Date | Result | Attendance | Notes |
|---|---|---|---|---|
| 1 | 17 October 1907 | New Zealand def. Widnes 26–11 | 8,000 | 1907–08 All Golds tour |
| 2 | 6 January 1909 | Australia def. Widnes 13–2 | 1,000 | 1908–09 Kangaroo tour |
| 3 | 11 October 1911 | Australasia def. Widnes 23–0 | 5,000 | 1911–12 Kangaroo tour |
| 4 | 6 October 1921 | Australasia def. Widnes 28–4 | 11,000 | 1921–22 Kangaroo tour |
| 5 | 27 December 1921 | Australasia def. Widnes 17–8 | 12,000 | 1921–22 Kangaroo tour |
| 6 | 28 September 1926 | New Zealand def. Widnes 15–5 | 6,000 | 1926–27 New Zealand Kiwis tour |
| 7 | 19 September 1929 | Australia def. Widnes 37–13 | 6,400 | 1929–30 Kangaroo tour |
| 8 | 26 October 1933 | Australia def. Widnes 31–0 | 6,691 | 1933–34 Kangaroo tour |
| 9 | 21 October 1937 | Widnes drew with Australia 13–13 | 4,201 | 1937–38 Kangaroo tour |
| 10 | 11 December 1948 | Australia def. Widnes 18–8 | 10,761 | 1948–49 Kangaroo tour |
| 11 | 6 December 1952 | Australia def. Widnes 18–7 | 7,411 | 1952–53 Kangaroo tour |
| 12 | 1 October 1959 | Australia def. Widnes 45–15 | 9,381 | 1959–60 Kangaroo tour |
| 13 | 21 November 1963 | Australia def. Widnes 20–9 | 6,509 | 1963–64 Kangaroo tour |
| 14 | 11 November 1967 | Australia def. Widnes 13–11 | 9,828 | 1967–68 Kangaroo tour |
| 15 | 14 October 1973 | Australia def. Widnes 25–10 | 5,185 | 1973 Kangaroo tour |
| 16 | 25 October 1978 | Widnes def. Australia 11–10 | 12,202 | 1978 Kangaroo tour |
| 17 | 9 November 1980 | Widnes def. New Zealand 14–7 | 6,416 | 1980 New Zealand Kiwis tour |
| 18 | 23 November 1982 | Australia def. Widnes 19–6 | 9,790 | 1982 Kangaroo tour |
| 19 | 12 November 1986 | Australia def. Widnes 24–4 | 10,268 | 1986 Kangaroo tour |
| 20 | 18 November 1990 | Australia def. Widnes 15–8 | 14,666 | 1990 Kangaroo tour |

== See also ==
- List of stadiums in the United Kingdom by capacity
- Lists of stadiums
