= Magic number (sports) =

Number used to indicate probability of winning tournaments

In certain sports, a magic number is used to indicate how close a front-running team is to clinching a division title and/or a playoff spot. It represents the total of additional wins by the front-running team or additional losses by the rival teams (or any combination of the two) after which it is mathematically impossible for the rival teams to capture the title in the remaining number of games (assuming some highly unlikely occurrence such as disqualification or expulsion from the competition or retroactive forfeiture of games does not occur).

The widespread use of magic numbers is generally limited to sports where games only count in the standings when the result is a win and a loss. Magic numbers are not usually used in sports where teams can be credited in some manner for part-wins in case of results such as ties and overtime losses. It could also be referred to as the "clinching number".

Teams other than the front-running team have what is called an elimination number (or "tragic number") (often abbreviated E#). This number represents the number of wins by the leading team or losses by the trailing team which will eliminate the trailing team. The largest elimination number among the non-first place teams is the magic number for the leading team.

== Calculation ==
The magic number is calculated as G + 1 − W_{A} − L_{B}, where

- G is the total number of games in the season
- W_{A} is the number of wins that Team A has in the season
- L_{B} is the number of losses that Team B has in the season

For example, in Major League Baseball there are 162 games in a season. Suppose the top of the division standings late in the season are:

Team	Wins	Losses
A	96	58
B	93	62

Then the magic number for Team B to be eliminated is 162 + 1 − 96 − 62 = 5.

Any combination of wins by Team A and losses by Team B totaling 5 makes it impossible for Team B to win the division title.

The "+1" in the formula serves to eliminating ties; without it, if the magic number decreased to zero and stayed there, the two pertinent teams would wind up with identical records. If circumstances dictate that the front-running team would win the tiebreaker regardless of any future results, then the additional constant 1 can be eliminated. For example, the NBA uses complicated formulae to break ties, using other statistics besides overall win–loss record; however the first tiebreaker between two teams is their head-to-head record; if the front-running team has already clinched the better head-to-head record, then the +1 is unnecessary. In 2022, Major League Baseball introduced tiebreaking scenarios (such as head-to-head for division ties) that made use of the "+1" pointless, as Game 163 was eliminated. However, if the team in first place does not have the tiebreaker, then the +1 would be necessary.

The magic number can also be calculated as W_{B} + GR_{B} − W_{A} + 1, where

- W_{B} is the number of wins that Team B has in the season
- GR_{B} is the number of games remaining for Team B in the season
- W_{A} is the number of wins that Team A has in the season

This second formula basically says: Assume Team B wins every remaining game. Calculate how many games team A needs to win to surpass team B's maximum total by 1. Using the example above and with the same 162-game season, team B has 7 games remaining.

The magic number for Team A to win the division is still "5": 93 + 7 − 96 + 1 = 5.

Team B can win as many as 100 games. If Team A wins 101, Team B is eliminated. The magic number would decrease with a Team A win and would also decrease with a Team B loss, as its maximum win total would decrease by one.

A variation of the above looks at the relation between the losses of the two teams. The magic number can be calculated as L_{A} + GR_{A} − L_{B} + 1, where

- L_{A} is the number of losses that Team A has in the season
- GR_{A} is the number of games remaining for Team A in the season
- L_{B} is the number of losses that Team B has in the season

This third formula basically says: Assume Team A loses every remaining game. Calculate how many games team B needs to lose to surpass team A's maximum total by 1. Using the example above and with the same 162-game season, team A has 8 games remaining.

The magic number for Team A to win the division is still "5": 58 + 8 − 62 + 1 = 5. As you can see, the magic number is the same whether calculating it based on potential wins of the leader or potential losses of the trailing team. Indeed, mathematical proofs will show that the three formulas presented here are mathematically equivalent.

Team A can lose as many as 66 games. If Team B loses 67, Team B is eliminated. Once again, the magic number would decrease with a Team A win and would also decrease with a Team B loss.

In some sports, ties are broken by an additional one-game playoff(s) between the teams involved. When a team gets to the point where its magic number is 1, it is said to have "clinched a tie" for the division or the wild card. However, if they end the season tied with another team, and only one is eligible for the playoffs, the extra playoff game will erase that "clinching" for the team that loses the playoff game.

Some sports use a tiebreaker formula instead of staging a one-game playoff. In such cases, it is necessary to look beyond the won-lost records of the teams to determine the magic number, since a team that has already guaranteed itself the edge in the tiebreaker formula would not need to include "+1" in calculating its magic number. For example, assume a basketball league that plays an 82-game season with no one-game tiebreakers shows division standings late in the season as follows:

Team	Wins	Losses
A	60	15
B	55	20

Suppose further that the first step in the league's tiebreaker formula is results in head-to-head meetings. Team A and Team B have met four times during the season with Team A winning three of the four games. They are not scheduled to meet again in the regular season. Therefore, Team A holds a tiebreaker edge over Team B and only needs to finish with the same number of wins as Team B in order to be placed ahead of Team B in the standings. Therefore, we can calculate Team A's magic number as 82 – 60 – 20 = 2. If Team A wins two of its seven remaining games, it will finish 62–20. If Team B wins all seven of its remaining games, it will also finish 62–20. However, since Team B loses the tiebreaker on head-to-head results, Team A is the division winner. In cases where the winners of potential tiebreakers have not yet been determined (for example, because the teams still have some games to play against each other) the usual convention is to calculate the magic numbers of the teams involved as if they will lose the tiebreaker, and to calculate the elimination numbers of such teams as if they will win the tiebreaker.

By convention, the magic number typically is used to describe the first place team only, relative to the teams it leads. However, the same mathematical formulas could be applied to any team, teams that are tied for the lead, as well as teams that trail. In these cases, a team that is not in first place will depend on the leading team to lose some games so that it may catch up, so the magic number will be larger than the number of games remaining. Ultimately, for teams that are no longer in contention, their magic number would be larger than their remaining games + the remaining games for the first place team — which would be impossible to overcome.

== Derivation ==
The formula for the magic number is derived straightforwardly as follows. As before, at some particular point in the season let Team A have W_{A} wins and L_{A} losses. Suppose that at some later time, Team A has w_{A} additional wins and l_{A} additional losses, and define similarly W_{B}, L_{B}, w_{B}, l_{B} for Team B. The total number of wins that Team B needs to make up is thus given by (W_{A} + w_{A}) − (W_{B} + w_{B}). Team A clinches when this number exceeds the number of games Team B has remaining, since at that point Team B cannot make up the deficit even if Team A fails to win any more games. If there are a total of G games in the season, then the number of games remaining for Team B is given by G − (W_{B} + w_{B} + L_{B} + l_{B}). Thus the condition for Team A to clinch is that (W_{A} + w_{A}) − (W_{B} + w_{B}) = 1 + G − (W_{B} + w_{B} + L_{B} + l_{B}). Canceling the common terms, we obtain w_{A} + l_{B} = G + 1 − W_{A} − L_{B}, which establishes the magic number formula.

== Games played quirk ==
In the following example, Team A's Magic Number is 5, because even though it can eliminate second-place Team B in 4 additional games, it would take 5 games to assuredly eliminate third-place Team C. Calculating the magic number requires using the lowest number of losses among the other competing teams: 162 + 1 − 88 − 70 = 5.

Team	Wins	Losses	Pct	GB	E#
A	88	56	.611	--	--
B	75	71	.514	14.0	4
C	73	70	.510	14.5	5

== Tie-breaker quirk ==
Another scenario where the Magic Number may vary from the mathematical calculation of the number can occur when there is a tie-breaker scenario. Most sports have a number of tie-breaker methods set up to deal with eventualities of tying records at the end of the season. Typically, the first of these methods involves head-to-head matchups of the teams and which team has won more games against the other during the season.

In the below example, Teams A and B both have 12 games remaining and the mathematical formula would dictate a Magic Number of 6 for Team A. 162+1-83-74=6.

However, if Team A wins only 5 of their remaining games and ends the season with a record of 88-74 and Team B wins all remaining games and ends the season with a tying record, Team A would win the division title if they have a winning record over Team B during the season, which would mean that in the below example, Team A actually has a Magic Number of 5.

Team	Wins	Losses	Pct	GB
A	83	67	.553	--
B	76	74	.507	7.0

== Subtlety ==
Sometimes a team can appear to have a mathematical chance to win even though they have actually been eliminated already, due to scheduling. In this Major League Baseball scenario, there are three games remaining in the season. Teams A, B and C are assumed to be eligible only for the division championship; teams with better records in other divisions have already clinched the three available "wild card" spots:

Team	Wins	Losses
A	87	72
B	87	72
C	85	74

If Team C were to win all three remaining games, it would finish at 88–74, and if both Teams A and B were to lose their three remaining games, they would finish at 87–75, which would make Team C the division winner. However, if Teams A and B are playing against each other in the final weekend (in a 3-game series), it would be impossible for both teams to lose the three remaining games. One of them will win at least two games and thereby clinch the division title with a record of either 90–72 or 89–73. The more direct consequence of this situation is that it is also not possible for Teams A and B to finish in a tie with each other, and Team C cannot win the division.

One can say definitely whether a team has been eliminated by use of the algorithm for the maximum flow problem.

The addition of a second Wild Card team makes the reverse scenario (in which a team has actually clinched a postseason berth even though it appears they could still be eliminated) possible in baseball. In this scenario for the Wild Card:

Team	Wins	Losses
A	89	70
B	87	72
C	87	72

If Teams B and C are playing their final three games against each other and all other teams have clinched their divisions or been mathematically eliminated from catching Team A, then Team A will have clinched at least the second Wild Card berth since it will be impossible for Teams B and C to both win enough games to catch Team A.

The reverse scenario is more common in sports that have more postseason berths, benefitting teams that are in the final playoff positions but being chased by teams that still have to play each other. Sometimes, both scenarios can occur simultaneously. In the following National Basketball Association scenario for teams placed seventh through tenth in the conference standings:

Team	Wins	Losses
A	42	38
B	41	39
C	41	39
D	40	40

If Teams B and C have to play one of their last two games against each other and Team A holds the tiebreaker against Teams B, C and D, then Team A will have clinched a playoff berth since they cannot be overtaken by both Teams B and C. Also, if Team D does not hold a tiebreaker against any of Teams A, B and C then it will be out of playoff contention since it cannot overtake both Teams B and C.

A similar scenario occasionally occurs in European soccer leagues and other competitions that use promotion and relegation. In this scenario for a 20 team soccer league that plays a double round robin format, awards three points for a win and one for a draw and relegates the 18th, 19th and 20th place teams:

Position	Team	Played	Points
16	A	36	38
17	B	36	34
18	C	36	32
19	D	36	28

If Team A loses its last two matches, it will finish with 38 points while if Team D wins its last two matches, it will finish with 34. Nevertheless, regardless of goal difference or any other tiebreaker, if Teams B and C still have to play each other then Team A is safe from relegation since Teams B and C cannot both reach 38 points, while Team D will be relegated since Teams B and C cannot both finish with less than 35 points.

== Alternative method ==
Another method can be used to determine the Elimination Number which uses only the Games Remaining ($GR_L, GR_T$) and Games Behind Leader (GBL) statistics, as follows: $E= \frac{GR_L+GR_T}{2}-GBL+1$,
where $GR_L$ means Games Remaining for Leader (similarly, $GR_T$ means Games Remaining for Trailer).

Refer back to the example presented above. The elimination number for Team B is once again "5": $E= \frac{8+7}{2}-3.5+1$.

It is necessary to use this method if the teams play different numbers of games in the full season, for instance due to cancellations or ties that will not be replayed. Note that this algorithm also is limited by the aforementioned subtleties.

== See also ==
- Games behind
- Elimination from postseason contention
