= 2008 Super League season results =

Rugby league competition results

This article details the 2008 Super League season results. From February to October 2008, a total of 162 games were played by twelve teams over 27 regular rounds, in addition to six games played during the play-off series. The season culminated with the Grand Final on 4 October.

== Regular season ==
All teams were required to play each team twice, once home and once away, as well as their Millennium Magic fixture, and four more fixtures decided by their league position at the end of the 2007 season.

=== Round 1 ===
Home	Score	Away	Match Information
Home	Score	Away	Date and Time	Venue	Referee	Attendance
Warrington Wolves	32–20	Hull	8 February, 19:30 GMT	Halliwell Jones Stadium	Ashley Klein	14,827
Harlequins RL	28–47	Wigan Warriors	9 February, 15:00 GMT	The Twickenham Stoop	Gareth Hewer	8,041
Castleford Tigers	14–21	Catalans Dragons	9 February, 18:00 GMT	The Jungle	Phil Bentham	7,060
Huddersfield Giants	10–30	Leeds Rhinos	10 February, 15:00 GMT	Galpharm Stadium	Ian Smith	15,629
Hull Kingston Rovers	24–22	St Helens R.F.C.	10 February, 15:00 GMT	New Craven Park	Ben Thaler	8,713
Wakefield Trinity Wildcats	26–24	Bradford Bulls	10 February, 15:30 GMT	Belle Vue	Richard Silverwood	9,851
Source: "Super League XIII 2008 – Round 1". Rugby League Project. Retrieved 2009-05-26.

=== Round 2 ===
Home	Score	Away	Match Information
Home	Score	Away	Date and Time	Venue	Referee	Attendance
St Helens R.F.C.	30–22	Warrington Wolves	15 February, 19:30 GMT	GPW Recruitment Stadium	Richard Silverwood	13,396
Wakefield Trinity Wildcats	8–44	Leeds Rhinos	15 February, 20:00 GMT	Belle Vue	Phil Bentham	9,863
Wigan Warriors	28–16	Castleford Tigers	15 February, 20:00 GMT	JJB Stadium	Ian Smith	16,667
Bradford Bulls	38–12	Huddersfield Giants	16 February, 18:00 GMT	Grattan Stadium	Ben Thaler	10,124
Catalans Dragons	20–24	Hull Kingston Rovers	16 February, 19:30 GMT	Stade Gilbert Brutus	Gareth Hewer	8,350
Hull	6–24	Harlequins RL	17 February, 15:15 GMT	KC Stadium	Ashley Klein	13,313
Source: "Super League XIII 2008 – Round 2". Rugby League Project. Retrieved 2009-05-26.

=== Round 3 ===
Home	Score	Away	Match Information
Home	Score	Away	Date and Time	Venue	Referee	Attendance
Bradford Bulls	16–22	St Helens R.F.C.	22 February, 19:30 GMT	Grattan Stadium	Phil Bentham	10,756
Hull	24–22	Wigan Warriors	22 February, 19:30 GMT	KC Stadium	Gareth Hewer	13,226
Leeds Rhinos	34–6	Catalans Dragons	22 February, 20:00 GMT	Headingley Stadium	Ben Thaler	14,083
Harlequins RL	34–18	Wakefield Trinity Wildcats	23 February, 17:30 GMT	The Twickenham Stoop	Ian Smith	3,176
Huddersfield Giants	64–12	Castleford Tigers	24 February, 15:00 GMT	Galpharm Stadium	Richard Silverwood	7,184
Hull Kingston Rovers	28–29	Warrington Wolves	24 February, 15:00 GMT	New Craven Park	Ashley Klein	8,704
Source: "Super League XIII 2008 – Round 3". Rugby League Project. Retrieved 2009-05-26.

=== Round 4 ===
- Leeds Rhinos vs Hull Kingston Rovers played before Round 1 to avoid a clash with Leeds' 2008 World Club Challenge fixture against the Melbourne Storm on 29 February.

Home	Score	Away	Match Information
Home	Score	Away	Date and Time	Venue	Referee	Attendance
Leeds Rhinos	20–12	Hull Kingston Rovers	2 February, 18:00 GMT	Headingley Stadium	Richard Silverwood	18,467
Wigan Warriors	28–14	Bradford Bulls	1 March, 18:00 GMT	JJB Stadium	Richard Silverwood	15,444
Castleford Tigers	16–22	Harlequins RL	2 March, 15:00 GMT	The Jungle	Ben Thaler	6,268
Huddersfield Giants	28–8	Hull	2 March, 15:00 GMT	Galpharm Stadium	Steve Ganson	8,012
St Helens R.F.C.	34–30	Wakefield Trinity Wildcats	2 March, 15:00 GMT	GPW Recruitment Stadium	Ian Smith	10,777
Warrington Wolves	38–18	Catalans Dragons	2 March, 15:00 GMT	Headingley Stadium	Phil Bentham	9,060
Source: "Super League XIII 2008 – Round 4". Rugby League Project. Retrieved 2009-05-26.

=== Round 5 ===
- Leeds, who had not dropped a point so far, became the first team to lose to Castleford this season.

Home	Score	Away	Match Information
Home	Score	Away	Date and Time	Venue	Referee	Attendance
Castleford Tigers	38–20	Leeds Rhinos	7 March, 19:30 GMT	The Jungle	Phil Bentham	9,459
St Helens R.F.C.	30–29	Hull	7 March, 19:30 GMT	GPW Recruitment Stadium	Richard Silverwood	10,204
Harlequins RL	24–0	Huddersfield Giants	8 March, 15:00 GMT	The Twickenham Stoop	Ian Smith	3,284
Warrington Wolves	32–20	Wigan Warriors	8 March, 18:00 GMT	Halliwell Jones Stadium	Steve Ganson	13,024
Catalans Dragons	18–20	Bradford Bulls	8 March, 19:30 GMT	Stade Gilbert Brutus	Gareth Hewer	7,485
Wakefield Trinity Wildcats	22–20	Hull Kingston Rovers	9 March, 15:30 GMT	Belle Vue	Ben Thaler	8,822
Source: "Super League XIII 2008 – Round 5". Rugby League Project. Retrieved 2009-05-26.

=== Round 6 ===
Home	Score	Away	Match Information
Home	Score	Away	Date and Time	Venue	Referee	Attendance
Hull	18–8	Wakefield Trinity Wildcats	14 March, 19:30 GMT	KC Stadium	Ashley Klein	12,024
Leeds Rhinos	48–0	Harlequins RL	14 March, 20:00 GMT	Headingley Stadium	Ben Thaler	14,557
Catalans Dragons	24–10	St Helens R.F.C.	15 March, 18:00 GMT	Stade Gilbert Brutus	Ian Smith	7,828
Hull Kingston Rovers	20–4	Castleford Tigers	15 March, 19:30 GMT	New Craven Park	Steve Ganson	8,083
Bradford Bulls	23–10	Warrington Wolves	16 March, 15:00 GMT	Grattan Stadium	Richard Silverwood	11,838
Huddersfield Giants	19–20	Wigan Warriors	16 March, 15:00 GMT	Galpharm Stadium	Phil Bentham	8,417
Source: "Super League XIII 2008 – Round 6". Rugby League Project. Retrieved 2009-05-26.

=== Round 7 ===
Home	Score	Away	Match Information
Home	Score	Away	Date and Time	Venue	Referee	Attendance
Leeds Rhinos	44–2	Bradford Bulls	20 March, 20:00 GMT	Headingley Stadium	Steve Ganson	19,296
Hull Kingston Rovers	11–10	Hull	21 March, 12:15 GMT	New Craven Park	Ashley Klein	9,284
St. Helens	46–10	Wigan Warriors	21 March, 14:30 GMT	GPW Recruitment Stadium	Richard Silverwood	17,500
Harlequins RL	22–24	Catalans Dragons	21 March, 15:00 GMT	The Twickenham Stoop	Phil Bentham	3,854
Warrington Wolves	30–14	Huddersfield Giants	21 March, 15:00 GMT	Halliwell Jones Stadium	Ben Thaler	9,320
Wakefield Trinity Wildcats	28–16	Castleford Tigers	21 March, 20:00 GMT	Belle Vue	Ian Smith	9,287
Source: "Super League XIII 2008 – Round 7". Rugby League Project. Retrieved 2009-05-26.

=== Round 8 ===
Home	Score	Away	Match Information
Home	Score	Away	Date and Time	Venue	Referee	Attendance
Hull	4–30	Leeds Rhinos	24 March, 13:00 GMT	KC Stadium	Phil Bentham	14,113
Wigan Warriors	18–12	Hull Kingston Rovers	24 March, 15:00 GMT	JJB Stadium	Ben Thaler	16,457
Huddersfield Giants	28–26	St. Helens	24 March, 15:00 GMT	Galpharm Stadium	Ian Smith	7,131
Castleford Tigers	31–34	Warrington Wolves	24 March, 15:30 GMT	The Jungle	Steve Ganson	7,245
Catalans Dragons	28–20	Wakefield Trinity Wildcats	24 March, 18:00 GMT	Stade Gilbert Brutus	Richard Silverwood	8,120
Bradford Bulls	32–24	Harlequins RL	24 March, 18:00 GMT	Grattan Stadium	Ashley Klein	8,428
Source: "Super League XIII 2008 – Round 8". Rugby League Project. Retrieved 2009-05-26.

=== Round 9 ===
Home	Score	Away	Match Information
Home	Score	Away	Date and Time	Venue	Referee	Attendance
St Helens R.F.C.	10–14	Leeds Rhinos	28 March, 19:30 GMT	GPW Recruitment Stadium	Ashley Klein	11,188
Wigan Warriors	8–4	Wakefield Trinity Wildcats	28 March, 20:00 GMT	JJB Stadium	Ian Smith	12,933
Warrington Wolves	6–8	Harlequins RL	29 March, 18:00 GMT	Halliwell Jones Stadium	Richard Silverwood	7,444
Catalans Dragons	28–28	Hull	29 March, 19:30 GMT	Stade Gilbert Brutus	Steve Ganson	8,450
Bradford Bulls	50–4	Castleford Tigers	30 March, 15:00 BST	Grattan Stadium	Ben Thaler	10,119
Hull Kingston Rovers	24–24	Huddersfield Giants	30 March, 15:00 BST	New Craven Park	Phil Bentham	7,101
Source: "Super League XIII 2008 – Round 9". Rugby League Project. Retrieved 2009-05-26.

=== Round 10 ===
Home	Score	Away	Match Information
Home	Score	Away	Date and Time	Venue	Referee	Attendance
Huddersfield Giants	16–20	Catalans Dragons	4 April, 19:30 BST	Galpharm Stadium	Richard Silverwood	4,071
Hull	8–24	Bradford Bulls	4 April, 20:00 BST	KC Stadium	Ben Thaler	13,617
Harlequins RL	35–16	Hull Kingston Rovers	5 April, 15:00 BST	The Twickenham Stoop	Ian Smith	4,560
Leeds Rhinos	10–14	Wigan Warriors	5 April, 18:00 BST	Headingley Stadium	Steve Ganson	18,769
Castleford Tigers	30–24	St Helens R.F.C.	6 April, 15:30 BST	The Jungle	Phil Bentham	7,529
Wakefield Trinity Wildcats	16–2	Warrington Wolves	6 April, 15:30 BST	Belle Vue	Ashley Klein	5,436
Source: "Super League XIII 2008 – Round 10". Rugby League Project. Retrieved 2009-05-26.

=== Round 11 ===
Home	Score	Away	Match Information
Home	Score	Away	Date and Time	Venue	Referee	Attendance
Castleford Tigers	12–32	Hull	11 April, 19:30 BST	The Jungle	Steve Ganson	8,136
St Helens R.F.C.	58–12	Harlequins RL	11 April, 19:30 BST	GPW Recruitment Stadium	Ben Thaler	8,533
Leeds Rhinos	32–12	Warrington Wolves	11 April, 20:00 BST	Headingley Stadium	Ian Smith	16,327
Wigan Warriors	24–26	Catalans Dragons	11 April, 20:00 BST	JJB Stadium	Ashley Klein	13,044
Huddersfield Giants	16–18	Wakefield Trinity Wildcats	12 April, 18:00 BST	Galpharm Stadium	Phil Bentham	5,693
Hull Kingston Rovers	20–18	Bradford Bulls	13 April, 15:00 BST	New Craven Park	Richard Silverwood	8,377
Source: "Super League XIII 2008 – Round 11". Rugby League Project. Retrieved 2009-05-26.

=== Round 12 ===
Home	Score	Away	Match Information
Home	Score	Away	Date and Time	Venue	Referee	Attendance
Warrington Wolves	22–30	St Helens R.F.C.	25 April, 19:30 BST	Halliwell Jones Stadium	Ashley Klein	13,024
Hull Kingston Rovers	22–36	Leeds Rhinos	25 April, 20:00 BST	New Craven Park	Richard Silverwood	9,391
Wakefield Trinity Wildcats	24–20	Harlequins RL	26 April, 18:00 BST	Belle Vue	Steve Ganson	5,016
Catalans Dragons	38–30	Castleford Tigers	26 April, 19:30 BST	Stade Gilbert Brutus	Phil Bentham	8,745
Bradford Bulls	26–12	Wigan Warriors	27 April, 15:00 BST	Grattan Stadium	Ben Thaler	11,894
Hull	28–20	Huddersfield Giants	27 April, 15:15 BST	KC Stadium	Ronnie Laughton	12,420
Source: "Super League XIII 2008 – Round 12". Rugby League Project. Retrieved 2009-05-26.

=== Round 13: Millennium Magic ===
- Round 13 of Super League XIII saw all of its games played at the Millennium Stadium, Cardiff in the Millennium Magic event.

Home	Score	Away	Match Information
Home	Score	Away	Date and Time	Venue	Referee	Attendance
Huddersfield Giants	34–36	Warrington Wolves	3 May, 15:00 BST	Millennium Stadium	Ben Thaler	~12,000
Castleford Tigers	16–54	Wakefield Trinity Wildcats	3 May, 17:00 BST	Millennium Stadium	Ian Smith	~15,000
Bradford Bulls	26–40	Leeds Rhinos	3 May, 19:00 BST	Millennium Stadium	Richard Silverwood	~18,000
Catalans Dragons	18–16	Harlequins RL	4 May, 14:30 BST	Millennium Stadium	Ashley Klein	~15,000
Hull	17–22	Hull Kingston Rovers	4 May, 16:30 BST	Millennium Stadium	Steve Ganson	~22,000
St Helens R.F.C.	57–16	Wigan Warriors	4 May, 18:30 BST	Millennium Stadium	Phil Bentham	~28,500
Source: "Super League XIII 2008 – Round 13". Rugby League Project. Retrieved 2009-05-26.

=== Round 14 ===
Home	Score	Away	Match Information
Home	Score	Away	Date and Time	Venue	Referee	Attendance
Wigan Warriors	38–14	Warrington Wolves	16 May, 19:30 BST	JJB Stadium	Ashley Klein	15,537
Leeds Rhinos	58–12	Wakefield Trinity Wildcats	16 May, 20:00 BST	Headingley Stadium	Richard Silverwood	17,647
St Helens R.F.C.	28–10	Catalans Dragons	17 May, 18:00 BST	GPW Recruitment Stadium	Phil Bentham	8,550
Harlequins RL	34–26	Hull	18 May, 15:00 BST	The Twickenham Stoop	Ben Thaler	3,793
Huddersfield Giants	50–16	Hull Kingston Rovers	18 May, 15:00 BST	Galpharm Stadium	Ian Smith	7,248
Castleford Tigers	24–46	Bradford Bulls	18 May, 15:30 BST	The Jungle	Ronnie Laughton	7,855
Source: "Super League XIII 2008 – Round 14". Rugby League Project. Retrieved 2009-05-26.

=== Round 15 ===
Home	Score	Away	Match Information
Home	Score	Away	Date and Time	Venue	Referee	Attendance
Bradford Bulls	14–30	Leeds Rhinos	23 May, 19:30 BST	Grattan Stadium	Phil Bentham	14,013
Catalans Dragons	48–0	Huddersfield Giants	24 May, 19:30 BST	Stade Gilbert Brutus	Ashley Klein	7,785
Hull Kingston Rovers	22–8	Harlequins RL	25 May, 15:00 BST	New Craven Park	Steve Ganson	8,084
Wakefield Trinity Wildcats	30–38	Wigan Warriors	25 May, 15:30 BST	Belle Vue	Ben Thaler	6,370
Hull	8–16	St Helens R.F.C.	25 May, 18:00 BST	KC Stadium	Richard Silverwood	14,653
Warrington Wolves	28–36	Castleford Tigers	26 May, 19:30 BST	Halliwell Jones Stadium	Ian Smith	7,788
Source: "Super League XIII 2008 – Round 15". Rugby League Project. Retrieved 2009-05-26.

=== Round 16 ===
- Wigan Warriors vs Huddersfield Giants rearranged due a pitch relay at the JJB Stadium.

Home	Score	Away	Match Information
Home	Score	Away	Date and Time	Venue	Referee	Attendance
St Helens R.F.C.	52–10	Hull Kingston Rovers	6 June, 19:30 BST	GPW Recruitment Stadium	Phil Bentham	8,404
Leeds Rhinos	38–22	Hull	6 June, 20:00 BST	Headingley Stadium	Ben Thaler	16,886
Castleford Tigers	16–32	Wakefield Trinity Wildcats	7 June, 18:00 BST	The Jungle	Ian Smith	8,236
Harlequins RL	24–40	Warrington Wolves	8 June, 15:00 BST	The Twickenham Stoop	Richard Silverwood	3,622
Bradford Bulls	16–24	Catalans Dragons	8 June, 15:00 BST	Grattan Stadium	Ashley Klein	8,346
Wigan Warriors	4–34	Huddersfield Giants	25 June, 20:00 BST	JJB Stadium	Ian Smith	12,216
Source: "Super League XIII 2008 – Round 16". Rugby League Project. Retrieved 2009-05-26.

=== Round 17 ===
Home	Score	Away	Match Information
Home	Score	Away	Date and Time	Venue	Referee	Attendance
St Helens R.F.C.	58–20	Bradford Bulls	13 June, 19:30 BST	GPW Recruitment Stadium	Richard Silverwood	9,009
Harlequins RL	28–24	Leeds Rhinos	14 June, 17:00 BST	The Twickenham Stoop	Ashley Klein	3,769
Catalans Dragons	45–38	Wigan Warriors	14 June, 20:00 BST	Stade Gilbert Brutus	Ian Smith	9,125
Warrington Wolves	38–20	Hull Kingston Rovers	15 June, 15:00 BST	Halliwell Jones Stadium	Ben Thaler	9,095
Hull	40–14	Castleford Tigers	15 June, 15:15 BST	KC Stadium	Phil Bentham	12,681
Wakefield Trinity Wildcats	28–26	Huddersfield Giants	15 June, 15:30 BST	Belle Vue	Steve Ganson	6,271
Source: "Super League XIII 2008 – Round 17". Rugby League Project. Retrieved 2009-05-26.

=== Round 18 ===
Home	Score	Away	Match Information
Home	Score	Away	Date and Time	Venue	Referee	Attendance
Leeds Rhinos	12–26	St Helens R.F.C.	20 June, 19:30 BST	Headingley Stadium	Steve Ganson	18,303
Hull Kingston Rovers	18–26	Wakefield Trinity Wildcats	21 June, 19:30 BST	New Craven Park	Ashley Klein	8,427
Catalans Dragons	52–14	Warrington Wolves	21 June, 20:00 BST	Stade Gilbert Brutus	Richard Silverwood	9,040
Huddersfield Giants	26–16	Harlequins RL	22 June, 15:00 BST	Galpharm Stadium	Phil Bentham	4,176
Bradford Bulls	36–22	Hull	22 June, 15:00 BST	Grattan Stadium	Ian Smith	9,511
Castleford Tigers	22–22	Wigan Warriors	22 June, 15:30 BST	The Jungle	Ben Thaler	7,048
Source: "Super League XIII 2008 – Round 18". Rugby League Project. Retrieved 2009-05-26.

=== Round 19 ===
Home	Score	Away	Match Information
Home	Score	Away	Date and Time	Venue	Referee	Attendance
Wigan Warriors	38–20	Harlequins RL	27 June, 19:30 BST	JJB Stadium	Ian Smith	11,453
Leeds Rhinos	18–12	Castleford Tigers	28 June, 18:00 BST	Headingley Stadium	Phil Bentham	17,619
St Helens R.F.C.	46–16	Huddersfield Giants	29 June, 15:00 BST	GPW Recruitment Stadium	Ashley Klein	8,597
Bradford Bulls	40–20	Hull Kingston Rovers	29 June, 15:00 BST	Grattan Stadium	Ben Thaler	9,741
Hull	22–24	Warrington Wolves	29 June, 15:15 BST	KC Stadium	Steve Ganson	11,988
Wakefield Trinity Wildcats	14–30	Catalans Dragons	1 July, 20:00 BST	Belle Vue	Richard Silverwood	5,479
Source: "Super League XIII 2008 – Round 19". Rugby League Project. Retrieved 2009-05-26.

=== Round 20 ===
Home	Score	Away	Match Information
Home	Score	Away	Date and Time	Venue	Referee	Attendance
Wigan Warriors	23–22	Leeds Rhinos	4 July, 20:00 BST	JJB Stadium	Ashley Klein	14,911
Harlequins RL	0–54	St Helens R.F.C.	5 July, 18:00 BST	The Twickenham Stoop	Ben Thaler	4,276
Castleford Tigers	18–10	Hull Kingston Rovers	6 July, 12:00 BST	The Jungle	Richard Silverwood	7,771
Huddersfield Giants	25–24	Bradford Bulls	6 July, 15:00 BST	Galpharm Stadium	Steve Ganson	10,786
Warrington Wolves	60–24	Wakefield Trinity Wildcats	6 July, 15:00 BST	Halliwell Jones Stadium	Phil Bentham	9,290
Hull	18–30	Catalans Dragons	6 July, 15:15 BST	KC Stadium	Ian Smith	11,006
Source: "Super League XIII 2008 – Round 20". Rugby League Project. Retrieved 2009-05-26.

=== Round 21 ===
Home	Score	Away	Match Information
Home	Score	Away	Date and Time	Venue	Referee	Attendance
St Helens R.F.C.	68–12	Castleford Tigers	11 July, 19:30 BST	GPW Recruitment Stadium	Phil Bentham	8,430
Warrington Wolves	32–28	Bradford Bulls	11 July, 20:00 BST	Halliwell Jones Stadium	Ben Thaler	8,158
Leeds Rhinos	46–8	Huddersfield Giants	11 July, 20:00 BST	Headingley Stadium	Thierry Alibert	14,739
Wakefield Trinity Wildcats	18–26	Hull	12 July, 18:00 BST	Belle Vue	Richard Silverwood	5,379
Catalans Dragons	32–26	Harlequins RL	12 July, 20:00 BST	Stade Gilbert Brutus	Ashley Klein	6,225
Hull Kingston Rovers	39–22	Wigan Warriors	13 July, 15:00 BST	New Craven Park	Ian Smith	8,481
Source: "Super League XIII 2008 – Round 21". Rugby League Project. Retrieved 2009-05-26.

=== Round 22 ===
Home	Score	Away	Match Information
Home	Score	Away	Date and Time	Venue	Referee	Attendance
Wigan Warriors	12–46	St Helens R.F.C.	18 July, 20:00 BST	JJB Stadium	Ashley Klein	19,958
Huddersfield Giants	18–19	Warrington Wolves	19 July, 18:00 BST	Galpharm Stadium	Richard Silverwood	5,033
Catalans Dragons	24–37	Leeds Rhinos	19 July, 20:00 BST	Stade Gilbert Brutus	Ian Smith	9,880
Hull	44–18	Hull Kingston Rovers	20 July, 12:15 BST	KC Stadium	Steve Ganson	21,283
Harlequins RL	12–66	Castleford Tigers	20 July, 15:00 BST	The Twickenham Stoop	Ben Thaler	2,112
Bradford Bulls	24–10	Wakefield Trinity Wildcats	20 July, 15:00 BST	Grattan Stadium	Phil Bentham	9,429
Source: "Super League XIII 2008 – Round 22". Rugby League Project. Retrieved 2009-05-26.

=== Round 23 ===
Home	Score	Away	Match Information
Home	Score	Away	Date and Time	Venue	Referee	Attendance
Hull Kingston Rovers	30–16	Catalans Dragons	1 August, 20:00 BST	New Craven Park	Richard Silverwood	8,074
Wigan Warriors	66–6	Hull	1 August, 20:00 BST	JJB Stadium	Ben Thaler	12,842
Warrington Wolves	22–12	Leeds Rhinos	2 August, 19:30 BST	Halliwell Jones Stadium	Steve Ganson	9,150
Harlequins RL	36–24	Bradford Bulls	3 August, 15:00 BST	The Twickenham Stoop	Ashley Klein	2,534
Wakefield Trinity Wildcats	10–42	St Helens R.F.C.	3 August, 15:30 BST	Belle Vue	Phil Bentham	5,781
Castleford Tigers	14–40	Huddersfield Giants	3 August, 15:30 BST	The Jungle	Richard Silverwood	6,935
Source: "Super League XIII 2008 – Round 23". Rugby League Project. Retrieved 2009-05-26.

=== Round 24 ===
Home	Score	Away	Match Information
Home	Score	Away	Date and Time	Venue	Referee	Attendance
Leeds Rhinos	28–18	Bradford Bulls	8 August, 20:00 BST	Headingley Stadium	Ben Thaler	17,508
St Helens R.F.C.	17–16	Warrington Wolves	9 August, 19:00 BST	GPW Recruitment Stadium	Richard Silverwood	10,258
Catalans Dragons	16–16	Wigan Warriors	9 August, 20:00 BST	Stade Gilbert Brutus	Steve Ganson	9,535
Hull Kingston Rovers	16–40	Harlequins RL	10 August, 15:00 BST	Craven Park	Phil Bentham	8,284
Wakefield Trinity Wildcats	22–48	Castleford Tigers	10 August, 15:30 BST	Belle Vue	Ian Smith	6,498
Hull	24–30	Huddersfield Giants	10 August, 18:00 BST	KC Stadium	Thierry Alibert	11,921
Source: "Super League XIII 2008 – Round 24". Rugby League Project. Retrieved 2009-05-26.

=== Round 25 ===
Home	Score	Away	Match Information
Home	Score	Away	Date and Time	Venue	Referee	Attendance
Wigan Warriors	32–22	Wakefield Trinity Wildcats	15 August, 20:00 BST	JJB Stadium	Ben Thaler	12,319
Leeds Rhinos	54–12	Castleford Tigers	15 August, 20:00 BST	Headingley Stadium	Thierry Alibert	17,354
Huddersfield Giants	20–22	Catalans Dragons	16 August, 19:30 BST	Galpharm Stadium	Ashley Klein	12,127
Warrington Wolves	34–36	Hull Kingston Rovers	17 August, 15:00 BST	Halliwell Jones Stadium	Phil Bentham	8,530
Harlequins RL	16–32	St Helens R.F.C.	17 August, 15:00 BST	The Twickenham Stoop	Steve Ganson	3,629
Bradford Bulls	42–14	Hull	17 August, 15:00 BST	Grattan Stadium	Ian Smith	9,181
Source: "Super League XIII 2008 – Round 25". Rugby League Project. Retrieved 2009-05-26.

=== Round 26 ===
Home	Score	Away	Match Information
Home	Score	Away	Date and Time	Venue	Referee	Attendance
Hull	26–6	Harlequins RL	22 August, 19:30 BST	KC Stadium	Thierry Alibert	12,269
Wigan Warriors	16–52	Leeds Rhinos	22 August, 20:00 BST	JJB Stadium	Ashley Klein	14,778
Catalans Dragons	32–38	Wakefield Trinity Wildcats	23 August, 20:00 BST	Stade Gilbert Brutus	Phil Bentham	8,320
Huddersfield Giants	22–40	St Helens R.F.C.	24 August, 15:00 BST	Galpharm Stadium	Ben Thaler	6,150
Castleford Tigers	44–24	Warrington Wolves	24 August, 19:30 BST	The Jungle	Ian Smith	5,902
Bradford Bulls	42–18	Hull Kingston Rovers	25 August, 14:15 BST	Grattan Stadium	Richard Silverwood	10,353
Source: "Super League XIII 2008 – Round 26". Rugby League Project. Retrieved 2009-05-26.

=== Round 27 ===
Home	Score	Away	Match Information
Home	Score	Away	Date and Time	Venue	Referee	Attendance
Wakefield Trinity Wildcats	12–30	Leeds Rhinos	5 September, 20:00 BST	Belle Vue	Steve Ganson	6,448
St Helens R.F.C.	16–16	Wigan Warriors	5 September, 20:00 BST	GPW Recruitment Stadium	Ashley Klein	13,500
Castleford Tigers	16–18	Bradford Bulls	6 September, 18:00 BST	The Jungle	Ian Smith	8,067
Warrington Wolves	20–38	Huddersfield Giants	6 September, 18:00 BST	Halliwell Jones Stadium	Ben Thaler	8,585
Hull Kingston Rovers	36–8	Hull	7 September, 12:00 BST	New Craven Park	Phil Bentham	10,197
Harlequins RL	34–24	Catalans Dragons	7 September, 15:00 BST	The Twickenham Stoop	Richard Silverwood	2,447
Source: "Super League XIII 2008 – Round 27". Rugby League Project. Retrieved 2009-05-26.

== Play-offs ==
The 2008 Super League championship was decided through a play-off system, in which the participants were included according to their league position at the end of 27 regular rounds. The play-off system had no bearing on the minor premiership (otherwise known as the League Leaders' Shield).

=== Format ===
Super League XIII followed the top-six play-off system. It was the seventh year in a row the format had been applied, as well as being the final year before the play-offs were expanded in the 2009 season. Places were granted to the top six teams in the Super League XIII table. Following the final round of matches on the weekend of 5–7 September, all six play-off teams were set (in order of finishing place):

	Team	Pld	W	D	L	PF	PA	PD	Pts
1	St Helens R.F.C.	27	21	1	5	940	457	+483	43
2	Leeds Rhinos	27	21	0	6	863	413	+450	42
3	Catalans Dragons	27	16	2	9	694	625	+69	34
4	Wigan Warriors	27	13	3	11	648	698	-50	29
5	Bradford Bulls	27	14	0	13	705	625	+80	28
6	Warrington Wolves	27	14	0	13	690	713	-23	28

Home field advantage was given by league position at the end of regular rounds, with the lower of the two teams playing at the higher team's ground. The only exception to this was the Grand Final, which was played at Old Trafford following tradition. The top-six system followed double elimination rules for the first and second placed team, meaning whichever of the teams lost in the qualifying semi-final had to lose again before being knocked-out of the play-offs entirely.

=== Bracket ===
Elimination play-offs
13 September 2008
3	Catalans Dragons	46
6	Warrington Wolves	8
12 September 2008
4	Wigan Warriors	30
5	Bradford Bulls	14

Qualifying/Elimination semifinal
19 September 2008
1	St Helens R.F.C.	38
2	Leeds Rhinos	10
20 September 2008
Catalans Dragons	26
Wigan Warriors	50

Elimination final
26 September 2008
Leeds Rhinos	18
Wigan Warriors	14

Grand Final
4 October 2008
St Helens R.F.C.	16
Leeds Rhinos	24

=== Details ===
Home	Score	Away	Match Information
Home	Score	Away	Date and Time	Venue	Referee	Attendance
Elimination play-offs
Wigan Warriors	30–14	Bradford Bulls	12 September, 20:00 BST	Stobart Stadium Halton^{[A]}	Ashley Klein	6,806
Catalans Dragons	46–8	Warrington Wolves	13 September, 18:30 BST	Stade Gilbert Brutus	Steve Ganson	8,442
Qualifying semifinals
St Helens R.F.C.	38–10	Leeds Rhinos	19 September, 20:00 BST	GPW Recruitment Stadium	Ashley Klein	11,407
Elimination semifinal
Catalans Dragons	26–50	Wigan Warriors	20 September, 18:00 BST	Stade Gilbert Brutus	Steve Ganson	9,985
Elimination final
Leeds Rhinos	18–14	Wigan Warriors	26 September, 20:00 BST	Headingley Stadium	Steve Ganson	13,112
2008 Super League Grand Final
St Helens R.F.C.	16–24	Leeds Rhinos	4 October, 18:00 BST	Old Trafford	Ashley Klein	68,810
Sources: Elimination play-offs: Wigan vs Bradford, Catalans vs Warrington; Qualifying Semifinal: St Helens vs Leeds; Elimination Semifinal: Catalans vs Wigan; Elimination Final: Leeds vs Wigan; Grand Final: St Helens vs Leeds.

^{A} Note A: Wigan Warriors vs Bradford Bulls was played at Stobart Stadium Halton due to the JJB Stadium being unavailable due to an association football fixture taking place the following day.

== Progression table ==
- Green cells indicate teams in play-off places at the end of the round. An underlined number indicates the team finished first in the table in that round.
- Note: Table is in round-by-round format, and does not necessarily follow chronological order. Rearranged fixtures are treated as though they were played on their respective rounds' weekends. Rearranged fixtures included:
  - Leeds Rhinos vs Hull Kingston Rovers, Round 4
  - Wigan Warriors vs Huddersfield Giants, Round 16

	Team	Round																										
	Team	1	2	3	4	5	6	7	8	9	10	11	12	13	14	15	16	17	18	19	20	21	22	23	24	25	26	27
1	St. Helens	0	2	4	6	8	8	10	10	10	10	12	14	16	18	20	22	24	26	28	30	32	34	36	38	40	42	43
2	Leeds	2	4	6	8	8	10	12	14	16	16	18	20	22	24	26	28	28	28	30	30	32	34	34	36	38	40	42
3	Catalans Dragons	2	2	2	2	2	4	6	8	9	11	13	15	17	17	19	21	23	25	27	29	31	31	31	32	34	34	34
4	Wigan	2	4	4	6	6	8	8	10	12	14	14	14	14	16	18	18	18	19	21	23	23	23	25	26	28	28	29
5	Bradford	0	2	2	2	4	6	6	8	10	12	12	14	14	16	16	16	16	18	20	20	20	22	22	22	24	26	28
6	Warrington	2	2	4	6	8	8	10	12	12	12	12	12	14	14	14	16	18	18	20	22	24	26	28	28	28	28	28
7	Hull Kingston Rovers	2	4	4	4	4	6	8	8	9	9	11	11	13	13	15	15	15	15	15	15	17	17	19	19	21	21	23
8	Wakefield Trinity	2	2	2	2	4	4	6	6	6	8	10	12	14	14	14	16	18	20	20	20	20	20	20	20	20	22	22
9	Harlequins RL	0	2	4	6	8	8	8	8	10	12	12	12	12	14	14	14	16	16	16	16	16	16	18	20	20	20	22
10	Huddersfield	0	0	2	4	4	4	4	6	7	7	7	7	7	9	9	11	11	13	13	15	15	15	17	19	19	19	21
11	Hull	0	0	2	2	2	4	4	4	5	5	7	9	9	9	9	9	11	11	11	11	13	15	15	15	15	17	17
12	Castleford	0	0	0	0	2	2	2	2	2	4	4	4	4	4	6	6	6	7	7	9	9	11	11	13	13	15	15
