= West Indian cricket team in England in 2007 =

West Indies in England in 2007
	West Indies	England
- Dates: 12 May – 7 July 2007
Captains	Ramnaresh Sarwan	Michael Vaughan

Test series
- Result: England won the 4-match series 3–0
Most runs	Shivnarine Chanderpaul (446)	Kevin Pietersen (466)
Most wickets	Corey Collymore (11)	Monty Panesar (23)
- Player of the series: Monty Panesar (Eng); Shivnarine Chanderpaul (WI)

One Day International series
- Results: West Indies won the 3-match series 2–1
Most runs	Shivnarine Chanderpaul (202)	Owais Shah (138)
Most wickets	Fidel Edwards (10)	Stuart Broad (5); James Anderson (5); Liam Plunkett (5)
- Player of the series: Shivnarine Chanderpaul (WI)

Twenty20 International series
- Results: 2-match series drawn 1–1
Most runs	Marlon Samuels (93)	Paul Collingwood (106)
Most wickets	Dwayne Smith (3); Darren Sammy (3)	James Anderson (3); Ryan Sidebottom (3)

The West Indian cricket team toured England from 12 May to 7 July 2007 as part of the 2007 English cricket season. The tour included four Tests, two Twenty20 international matches and three One Day Internationals. While England dominated the Test series 3–0, including a record victory over the West Indies, the latter took the ODI series 2:1.

== Comparative performances ==
=== Test matches ===
In the ICC Test Championship, England are ranked second and West Indies are ranked eighth, though England's most recent series was a whitewash loss in the Ashes against Australia for the first time since 1921, their first Test series loss since their tour of Pakistan in 2005. West Indies, meanwhile, lost 2–0 to Pakistan in November 2006 as their last Test series, and have not won a Test since April 2005. The last time West Indies won an away Test to a nation currently ranked above them was on their tour of England in 2000 – they also beat Zimbabwe and Bangladesh twice during the intervening seven years.

=== One-Day Internationals ===
The ICC ODI Championship sees England ranked just ahead of West Indies, as seventh and eighth respectively, though West Indies are more competitive in ODIs. They finished fifth and sixth in the Super Eight stage of the recent World Cup, with England finishing ahead of West Indies by virtue of their one-wicket win. West Indies, however, reached the final of the Champions Trophy in October 2006, and defeated India 4–1 in a home series in May. England also acquired one ODI series win in the past year, defeating Australia in the final of the 2007 Commonwealth Bank Series, their first series win abroad since 1998. They were, however, defeated 0–5 at home by Sri Lanka in June, as well as drawing 2–2 with Pakistan.

== Squads ==
This was Peter Moores' first series as England Coach, and Andy Flower, former Zimbabwe wicket-keeper batsman, was his newly appointed assistant. Michael Vaughan had been set to return to Test cricket for his first match in 17 months after captaining England during the World Cup, but an injury to his finger ruled him out of the first Test, and Andrew Strauss was appointed as captain in his place. James Anderson was a late addition to the squad as cover for Andrew Flintoff, though neither eventually played the first Test. Flintoff was also ruled out of playing in the second Test, despite having been named in the squads for both of the first two Tests.

During the first Test Matthew Hoggard suffered an injury, and took no further part in the match after the first West Indian innings, and he was also ruled out of playing in the second Test. His replacement was Ryan Sidebottom, recalled six years after his only previous Test, while Vaughan returned from injury as captain. Owais Shah was dropped to make way for Vaughan. Hoggard was called back to the England squad for the fourth and final Test at Chester-le-Street pending his fitness, while Liam Plunkett was dropped.

During the Fourth Test, Vaughan abruptly announced his resignation from the one-day captaincy, and was replaced by Paul Collingwood. The subsequent squad announcement then saw Vaughan and out-of-form Andrew Strauss dropped in favour of Jonathan Trott and Dimitri Mascarenhas.

For West Indies, Brian Lara had retired from all cricket at the end of the World Cup, and Ramnaresh Sarwan replaced him as captain for this series. Lendl Simmons had been dropped since the tour of Pakistan, and Devon Smith and Sylvester Joseph entered the squad as specialist batsmen. Spinners Omari Banks and Dave Mohammed had been left out for seamers Ravi Rampaul and Darren Sammy.

Sarwan injured his collarbone during the second Test at Headingley, ruling him out of the remainder of the tour. Marlon Samuels was called up as his replacement, while Daren Ganga was named stand-in captain for the remainder of the Test series. There was speculation that the selectors named Chris Gayle as captain of the ODI squad, only for the West Indies Cricket Board to reject the decision and asked the selectors to include Daren Ganga as captain instead.

In the end, Gayle was chosen as one-day captain, with Shivnarine Chanderpaul assuming vice-captaincy duties. Also, one-day specialists Austin Richards, Dwayne Smith and a recalled Simmons were called in to replace Joseph, Ganga and Corey Collymore.

Test squads		One-day squads
England Andrew Strauss (c) Michael Vaughan (c) Matt Prior (wk) James Anderson Ian Bell Paul Collingwood Alastair Cook Andrew Flintoff Steve Harmison Matthew Hoggard Monty Panesar Kevin Pietersen Liam Plunkett Owais Shah Ryan Sidebottom	West Indies Ramnaresh Sarwan (c) Daren Ganga (c) Denesh Ramdin (wk) Dwayne Bravo Shivnarine Chanderpaul Corey Collymore Fidel Edwards Chris Gayle Sylvester Joseph Runako Morton Daren Powell Ravi Rampaul Darren Sammy Marlon Samuels Devon Smith Jerome Taylor	England Paul Collingwood (c) Matt Prior (wk) James Anderson Ian Bell Stuart Broad Alastair Cook Dimitri Mascarenhas Monty Panesar Kevin Pietersen Liam Plunkett Owais Shah Ryan Sidebottom Jonathan Trott Michael Yardy	West Indies Chris Gayle (c) Shivnarine Chanderpaul (vc) Denesh Ramdin (wk) Dwayne Bravo Fidel Edwards Runako Morton Daren Powell Ravi Rampaul Austin Richards Darren Sammy Marlon Samuels Lendl Simmons Dwayne Smith Devon Smith

== Test series ==
=== 1st Test ===
17–21 May
Scorecard

England	v	West Indies
553/5d (142 overs); Matt Prior 126* (128); Daren Powell 2/113 (37 overs)		437 (116.1 overs); Shivnarine Chanderpaul 74 (193); Monty Panesar 6/129 (36.1 overs)
284/8d (66.5 overs); Kevin Pietersen 109 (138); Corey Collymore 3/58 (15 overs)		89/0 (22 overs); Chris Gayle 47* (64)

Match drawn
Lord's, London
Umpires: Rudi Koertzen (SA) and Asad Rauf (Pak)
Player of the match: Alastair Cook (Eng)

- West Indies won the toss and elected to field.
- Only 20 overs played on Day 5 due to rain.

=== 2nd Test ===
25–29 May
Scorecard

England	v	West Indies
570/7d (122.3 overs); Kevin Pietersen 226 (262); Corey Collymore 2/110 (29 overs)		146 (37 overs); Devon Smith 26 (37); Ryan Sidebottom 4/42 (12 overs)
		141 (f/o) (42.1 overs); Dwayne Bravo 52 (74); Ryan Sidebottom 4/44 (15 overs)

England won by an innings & 283 runs
Headingley Cricket Ground, Leeds
Umpires: Rudi Koertzen (SA) and Asad Rauf (Pak)
Player of the match: Kevin Pietersen (Eng)

- England won the toss and elected to bat.
- No play on day 3 due to persistent rain.
- Captain Ramnaresh Sarwan was injured and unable to bat in either West Indies' innings so their innings closed with nine wickets down.

This was West Indies' heaviest defeat in Test cricket. The fourth day was played with the temperature around seven degrees Celsius in the morning; the coldest playing conditions for a Test in England.

=== 3rd Test ===
7–11 June
Scorecard

England	v	West Indies
370 (105.1 overs); Ian Bell 97 (191); Corey Collymore 3/60 (25 overs)		229 (52.4 overs); Shivnarine Chanderpaul 50 (78); Monty Panesar 4/50 (16.4 overs)
313 (85.3 overs); Alastair Cook 106 (216); Darren Sammy 7/66 (21.3 overs)		394 (132.5 overs); Shivnarine Chanderpaul 116* (257); Monty Panesar 6/137 (51.5 overs)

England won by 60 runs
Old Trafford, Manchester
Umpires: Billy Bowden (NZ) and Aleem Dar (Pak)
Player of the match: Monty Panesar (Eng)

- England won the toss and elected to bat.

England, looking to take an unassailable lead in the series, batted first, sending Andrew Strauss and Alastair Cook to the wicket, but Strauss was dismissed in single figures, his fourteenth innings without making it past 50, plumb lbw by Jerome Taylor. Captain Michael Vaughan joined Cook and held the fence until lunch, with Cook reaching the fifty just before the end of the session with the total on the 112.

Twelve overs after lunch yielded three wickets and 20 runs. Vaughan, seeking centuries in successive Test matches for the first time since the 2002–03 Ashes, was clean bowled for 42 by Corey Collymore, Kevin Pietersen was caught by Bravo off Collymore, while Cook was bowled by debutant Darren Sammy. Paul Collingwood met with Ian Bell for the fifth-wicket partnership, though Bell was the dominant partner as the two made 32 in twelve overs before Taylor struck to leave England at 166 for five. However, the last five provided more than the top five, largely due to Ian Bell who made 97, three short of his seventh Test century, leaving him with a batting average of 84 batting at six in Test cricket. The tenth-wicket also did better than their batting averages would suggest, with Monty Panesar and Ryan Sidebottom both passing 14 in a 32-run partnership before Fidel Edwards bowled Panesar. Extras, with 47, was the third-highest scorer behind Bell and Cook.

With just three overs before lunch, the West Indies made six runs in the first over before an unpredictable over from Steve Harmison, who conceded six runs with wides before delivering his first legal delivery of the Test. However, in a 9-ball over, he did get Daren Ganga out lbw for 6. During the lunch break, West Indies lodged a complaint against Harmison who had unwittingly contravened Law 17 by practising on the match strip before the innings. The complaint was denied

Harmison conceded 15 more runs, as well as six byes and two leg-byes, in three overs after lunch, but Liam Plunkett struck with his third ball and West Indies were two down for 49. Devon Smith, Runako Morton, Shiv Chanderpaul and Dwayne Bravo all provided passed 20 runs, with Smith and Chanderpaul having the staying power to bat more than an hour, and at 216 for four West Indies were 56 ahead of the English score at the fall of the fifth wicket. However, in the space of 43 balls West Indies lost six wickets, with Ryan Sidebottom and Monty Panesar splitting them evenly and conceding 13 runs in the process. Once again, extras was a near-top-scorer, only eight runs short of Chanderpaul's 50.

Andrew Strauss failed to proved himself again with a second ball lbw, falling for successive double-digit scores for the first time in 35 Test matches, leaving No. 3 Vaughan to effectively open once more. With the total on 28, and both batsmen with two fours to their name, Denesh Ramdin threw up the ball after an appeal off Cook, who scurried for a single in the confusion. Cook was awarded a run, though as the ball hadn't hit bat and he wasn't caught behind, it was eventually a bye. Then, Ramdin let slip a sitter through his legs which went on to hit his helmet, boosting the English with a mandatory five penalty runs before the second day's play ended.

England, having achieved a lead of 141 on first innings, pushed onwards on the third day, losing one wicket in each of the first two sessions, though they had the benefit of West Indies' fielding being between "amateurish and abysmal" according to Cricinfo journalist Andrew McGlashan. Vaughan fell in the forties once again, a return catch for Darren Sammy's second Test wicket, while Kevin Pietersen fell to a bizarre dismissal when West Indian all-rounder Dwayne Bravo delivered a 70 mph bouncer, knocking off Pietersen's helmet which fell onto the stumps, leaving Pietersen out hit wicket. After tea, Gayle broke through to have Cook lbw for 106, before Sammy took six wickets in a seven-over spell to end with figures of seven for 66, the second best by a West Indies bowler on debut, and the best by a debutant in 57 years. Among the wickets was Bell's for two, causing his average at six to drop between 75. The fourth innings had only 8 overs in which Gayle scored a quick four, but Harmison continued the Test's string of early dismissals trapping Ganga plumb for a duck. This didn't stop the West Indies attacking to their target of 455 as 3 more fours were hit, despite two massive appeals from Panesar. The Windies batted slowly and carefully over the two days and ended up falling only 61 runs short of winning the match. If they had reached the total it would have been the highest fourth innings total ever to win a Test match. Shivnarine Chanderpaul top scored with 116 not out.

=== 4th Test ===
15–19 June
Scorecard

West Indies	v	England
287 (97.1 overs); Shivnarine Chanderpaul 136* (257); Ryan Sidebottom 5/88 (29 overs)		400 (100 overs); Paul Collingwood 128 (188); Fidel Edwards 5/112 (23 overs)
222 (64 overs); Shivnarine Chanderpaul 70 (163); Monty Panesar 5/46 (16 overs)		111/3 (21.4 overs); Michael Vaughan 48* (51)

England won by 7 wickets
Riverside Ground, Chester-le-Street
Umpires: Billy Bowden (NZ) and Aleem Dar (Pak)
Player of the match: Shivnarine Chanderpaul (WI)

- England won the toss and elected to field.
- No play on day 1 and a delayed start on days 2 and 5 due to rain.

== T20I series ==
=== 1st T20I ===
28 June
Scorecard

West Indies; 208/8 (20 overs)	v	England; 193/7 (20 overs)
Devon Smith 61 (34); James Anderson 2/37 (4 overs)		Paul Collingwood 79 (41); Dwayne Smith 3/24 (4 overs)

West Indies won by 15 runs
The Oval, London
Umpires: Peter Hartley (Eng) and Nigel Llong (Eng)
Player of the match: Paul Collingwood (Eng)

- West Indies won the toss and elected to bat.

=== 2nd T20I ===
29 June
Scorecard

West Indies; 169/7 (20 overs)	v	England; 173/5 (19.4 overs)
Chris Gayle 61 (37); Paul Collingwood 2/21 (2 overs)		Owais Shah 55* (35); Ravi Rampaul 2/39 (4 overs)

England won by 5 wickets
The Oval, London
Umpires: Ian Gould (Eng) and Nigel Llong (Eng)
Player of the match: Owais Shah (Eng)

- West Indies won the toss and elected to bat.
- Lendl Simmons (WI) made his T20I debut.

== ODI series ==
=== 1st ODI ===
1 July
Scorecard

England; 225 (49.5 overs)	v	West Indies; 146 (39.5 overs)
Ian Bell 56 (75); Fidel Edwards 5/45 (10 overs)		Shivnarine Chanderpaul 53* (100); Stuart Broad 3/20 (9 overs)

England won by 79 runs
Lord's, London
Umpires: Brian Jerling (SA) and Nigel Llong (Eng)
Player of the match: Fidel Edwards (WI)

- West Indies won the toss and elected to field.
- Play stopped after 42.4 overs due to rain.

Fidel Edwards claimed his second ODI 5-wicket haul; the 8th ODI 5-wicket haul at Lord's.

=== 2nd ODI ===
4 July
Scorecard

West Indies; 278/5 (50 overs)	v	England; 217 (46 overs)
Shivnarine Chanderpaul 116* (122); Stuart Broad 2/49 (10 overs)		Matt Prior 52 (73); Ravi Rampaul 4/41 (10 overs)

West Indies won by 61 runs
Edgbaston Cricket Ground, Birmingham
Umpires: Brian Jerling (SA) and Nigel Llong (Eng)
Player of the match: Shivnarine Chanderpaul (WI)

- England won the toss and elected to field.
- Play stopped after 33 overs in West Indies innings due to rain.
- Play stopped after 14 overs and after 40 overs in England's innings due to rain.

=== 3rd ODI ===
7 July
Scorecard

West Indies; 289/5 (50 overs)	v	England; 196 (44.2 overs)
Runako Morton 82* (89); Liam Plunkett 3/59 (10 overs)		Owais Shah 51 (66); Daren Powell 4/40 (10 overs)

West Indies win by 93 runs
Trent Bridge, Nottingham
Umpires: Mark Benson (Eng) and Brian Jerling (SA)
Player of the match: Daren Powell (WI)

- West Indies won the toss and elected to bat.
- Chris Gayle (WI) passed 6,000 ODI runs when he reached 34.
- Paul Collingwood (Eng) passed 3,000 ODI runs when he reache 28.

England started well getting the early wicket of Devon Smith in the third over, but a good partnership between Chris Gayle and Shivnarine Chanderpaul, producing a second-wicket partnership of 77 gave West Indies a strong platform. England then got two quick wickets of Chanderpaul and Samuels in the space of 15 deliveries to put the game in the balance. West Indies solidified their position, however, with Runako Morton and Chris Gayle putting on 85 for the fourth wicket. Quick batting from Dwayne Bravo (42 runs from 24 balls) ensured that the West Indies set a good score of 289/5 at the end of the innings and England needed 290 runs to win.

== Tour matches ==
=== West Indians v Somerset ===
12–14 May
Scorecard

West Indians	v	Somerset
237/4 (48.4 overs); Runako Morton 103* (118); Steffan Jones 3/74 (18.4 overs)

Match drawn
County Ground, Taunton
Umpires: Steven Garratt (Eng) and Roy Palmer (Eng)

- West Indians won the toss and elected to bat.
- No play on day 2 or 3 due to rain.
- Somerset selected 12 players and the West Indians selected 13 (11 batting, 11 fielding).

=== West Indians v Marylebone Cricket Club ===
1–3 June
Scorecard

Marylebone Cricket Club	v	West Indians
260 (99.3 overs); Shaaiq Choudhry 54* (143); Jerome Taylor 5/43 (18 overs)		534/8d (129.1 overs); Runako Morton 201 (246); Simon Butler 3/121 (29.3 overs)
64/5 (24 overs); Paul Dixey 17 (48); Darren Sammy 2/14 (6 overs)

Match drawn
The Racecourse, Durham
Umpires: John Holder (Eng) and David Millns (Eng)

- Marylebone Cricket Club won the toss and elected to bat.
- Simon Butler and Shaaiq Choudhry (both MCC) made their first-class debuts.

=== West Indians v England Lions ===
21 June
Scorecard

England Lions; 174/6 (24 overs)	v	West Indians; 178/3 (23.1 overs)
Vikram Solanki 38 (26); Marlon Samuels 3/16 (5 overs)		Denesh Ramdin 73 (52); James Anderson 1/25 (5 overs)

West Indies won by 7 wickets
New Road, Worcester
Umpires: Rob Bailey (Eng) and Nigel Cowley (Eng)

- England Lions won the toss and elected to bat.
- Play reduced to 24 overs due to rain.
- Ruel Brathwaite (WI) made his List A debut.

=== West Indians v Derbyshire ===
24 June
Scorecard

Derbyshire; 135/6 (20 overs)	v	West Indians; 84 (15.4 overs)
Simon Katich 31 (28); Chris Gayle 2/15 (2 overs)		Austin Richards 25 (33); Tom Lungley 4/11 (2.4 overs)

Derbyshire won by 51 runs
County Cricket Ground, Derby
Umpires: Richard Illingworth (Eng) and Tim Robinson (Eng)

- Derbyshire won the toss and elected to bat.
- Dan Birch (Derbys), Daren Powell, Ravi Rampaul and Lendl Simmons (all WI)

=== West Indians v PCA Masters XI ===
26 June
Scorecard

West Indians; 198/1 (20 overs)	v	PCA Masters XI; 142 (19.4 overs)
Devon Smith 77* (53); Nathan Astle 1/29 (3 overs)		Azhar Mahmood 41 (26); Marlon Samuels 4/19 (4 overs)

West Indies won by 56 runs
Arundel Castle Cricket Club Ground, Arundel
Umpires: Martin Bodenham (Eng) and Neil Mallender (Eng)

- West Indians won the toss and elected to bat.

== West Indies in Ireland ==
Following the completion of their tour to England, the West Indies will play in a Four-Nations ODI tournament in Ireland, where they will play One Day Internationals against the hosts, the Netherlands and Scotland.

== Records ==
- When five English batsmen recorded centuries during the 1st Test at Lords, it was the first time that this had taken place since 1938.
- Matt Prior's debut score of 126 was the first time an English wicket-keeper had scored a century on his début.
- England's win in the second Test by an innings and 283 runs was the West Indies' heaviest defeat in Test cricket.
- The fourth day of the second Test was played with the temperature around seven degrees Celsius in the morning; the coldest playing conditions for a Test in England.
- Play on the fourth day of the third Test saw the highest number of extras in a Test match in England, and the second highest ever. By the end of the Test, poor fielding by the West Indies and inconsistent bowling by both sides had added 167 to the cumulative run total, which included 51 byes, 45 leg byes, 27 no-balls and 29 wides.
- With England's defeat of the West Indies in the third Test, Michael Vaughan became the most successful England Test captain, having won 21 out of 35 the Test matches in which he has led his team.
- Shivnarine Chanderpaul ended the three test series with an average of 148.66, surpassing Donald Bradman's average of 126.50 set in 1930, to set a new record for the highest average by an overseas player during a tour of England.
