= Alastair Cook =

English cricketer (born 1984)

Sir Alastair Cook CBE
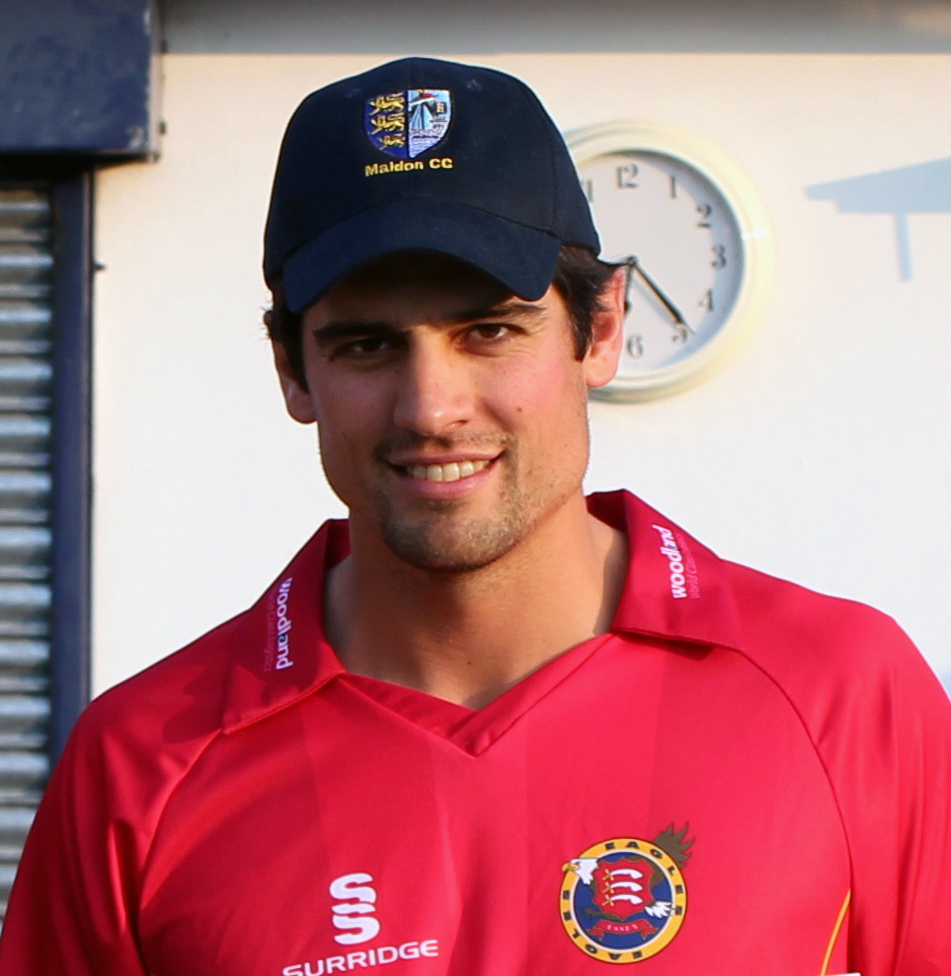
- Cook in 2014

Personal information
- Full name: Alastair Nathan Cook
- Born: 25 December 1984 (age 41); Gloucester, Gloucestershire, England
- Nickname: Cookie, Chef, Captain Cook
- Height: 6 ft 2 in (188 cm)
- Batting: Left-handed
- Bowling: Right-arm slow seam
- Role: Opening batsman

International information
- National side: England (2006–2018)
- Test debut (cap 630): 1 March 2006 v India
- Last Test: 7 September 2018 v India
- ODI debut (cap 196): 28 June 2006 v Sri Lanka
- Last ODI: 16 December 2014 v Sri Lanka
- ODI shirt no.: 26
- T20I debut (cap 24): 28 June 2007 v West Indies
- Last T20I: 15 November 2009 v South Africa
- T20I shirt no.: 26

Domestic team information
- Years: Team
- 2002: Bedfordshire
- 2003: Essex Cricket Board
- 2003–2023: Essex (squad no. 26)

Career statistics
Competition	Test	ODI	FC	LA
Matches	161	92	352	178
Runs scored	12,472	3,204	26,643	6,510
Batting average	45.35	36.40	46.41	39.93
100s/50s	33/57	5/19	74/125	13/38
Top score	294	137	294	137
Balls bowled	18	–	294	18
Wickets	1	–	7	0
Bowling average	7.00	–	32.00	–
5 wickets in innings	0	–	0	–
10 wickets in match	0	–	0	–
Best bowling	1/6	–	3/13	–
Catches/stumpings	175/–	36/–	386/–	73/–
Medal record
Men's cricket
Representing England
ICC Champions Trophy
Runner-up	2013 England and Wales
- Source: ESPNcricinfo, 29 September 2023

Sir Alastair Nathan Cook (born 25 December 1984) is an English commentator and a former cricketer and captain of the England Test and One-Day International (ODI) cricket teams. Known for his compact technique and ability to bat for long periods, Cook is widely regarded as one of the greatest batters of his era and one of the greatest opening batsman of all time. He is the sixth-highest Test run scorer of all time and second-highest run scorer for England. He is England's second most-capped Test batsman and captained the England team in 59 Tests, as well as in 69 ODIs. He was also the youngest player to score 12,000 test runs. Cook retired from Test cricket in September 2018 and played for Essex in English domestic cricket until 2023, while also working for the BBC radio programme Test Match Special.

Cook played for Essex's Academy and made his debut for the first XI in 2003. He played in several of England's youth teams from 2000 until his call up to the Test team in 2006. Cook was called up to the England national team in India as a last-minute replacement for Marcus Trescothick and debuted, aged 21, with a century. He went on to score 1,000 runs in his maiden year and made centuries in his first Test matches against India, Pakistan, the West Indies and Bangladesh.

Cook was appointed captain of the Test team after Andrew Strauss's retirement on 29 August 2012. After England's 2016 tour of Bangladesh and India, he stepped down as Test captain. Cook retired from international cricket after the 2018 series against India, and from all forms of cricket in October 2023. Cook was appointed MBE in 2011 and promoted to CBE in 2016 for services to cricket. In the 2019 New Year Honours, Cook was appointed a Knight Bachelor for services to cricket. On the occasion of England's 1000th Test in August 2018, Cook was named in the country's greatest Test XI by the ECB. In 2023, Cook was inducted into the ICC Cricket Hall of Fame.

== Early life and education ==
Cook was born in Gloucester; his mother Stephanie is a teacher from Swansea, while his father Graham worked as a telecommunications engineer and enjoyed village cricket. Cook is a keen musician: by the age of eight he was learning the clarinet. He became a boarding pupil at St Paul's Cathedral School in London, an independent school connected to the cathedral, as a chorister, with a rigorous schedule of rehearsals.

When he was a boy, his family lived in Wickham Bishops, a village near Witham in central Essex. During his summer holidays, Cook played cricket for nearby Maldon Cricket Club, and by the age of 11 he was already playing in the adult Third XI. He played sporadically for Maldon over seven years, with an average of 168 in his final year. He is now an honorary life member of the club.

Aged 13, Cook's musical flair led him to become a boarding pupil at Bedford School, an independent school for boys in the county town of Bedford. He sang, played the clarinet to grade eight and learned to play piano and saxophone. Music was soon eclipsed when the Marylebone Cricket Club (MCC) came to play against the Bedford School XI. The visiting team were a man short and drafted the 14-year-old new boy to play against his school, and Cook scored a century.

Over the next four years, he hit 17 centuries and two double-hundreds to total 4,396 runs at an average of 87.90, captaining the cricket team in his final year as well as being President of the Music Society. He also gained three A-Levels and nine GCSEs. In his final year at Bedford in 2003, he scored 1,287 runs for the school, including two unbeaten double-hundreds, averaging 160.87 to take the school record. After his international success, Cook returned for an Old Boys' match at Bedford in 2008, playing for the Head Master's Ultimate XI.

== Domestic cricket ==
=== Debut (2003–2005) ===
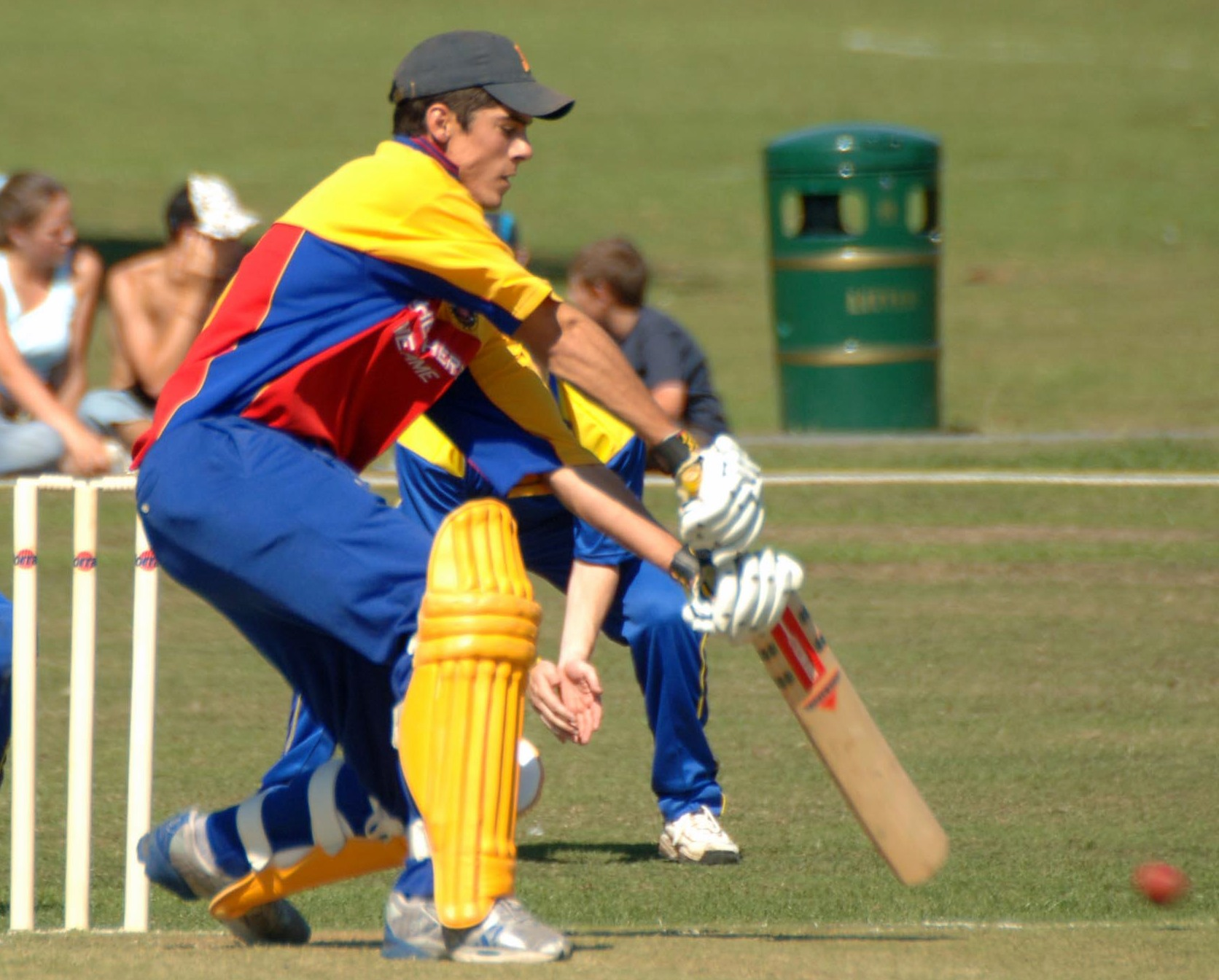
Cook batting in 2005

Having been a member of the Essex Academy since the age of 16, Cook was given his first-class debut for Essex against Nottinghamshire County Cricket Club on leaving school at the end of the 2003 season; put in to field he aided the first dismissal with a catch before scoring just 13 runs in his first innings but pushed Essex to a nine wicket victory with 69 not out in the second. Despite Essex's relegation being assured, Cook still battled away with an opening stand of 122 opposite Will Jefferson in the second innings of his second match, against Warwickshire. In the six innings in which he participated he quickly racked up three half centuries at an average of 47.80.

Having secured his place as opener in the county team, he made his maiden first-class century against Leicestershire in May 2004 with 126 opposite Jefferson's 128 in an opening stand of 265, Essex's third-highest, but the team failed to secure promotion. He was brought in as opening batsman for the MCC in 2005 season's opener against County Champions Warwickshire. With a century in the first innings and 97 in the second, Cook helped secure victory in a match destined for a draw. The season opener would not be Cook's only highlight for the year: as the Ashes approached, Australia were touring the counties and in a two-day match (which did not count towards his first-class statistics) Cook scored a double century and went on to take the first wicket of Justin Langer with a catch in the drawn match days after being awarded PCA Young Cricketer of the Year.

A further highlight of the season saw Cook help Essex to achieve one of Durham's two defeats of the season, scoring 107 of Essex's 245 before taking his maiden first-class wicket, followed by another two, with his off-spin. Cook played in every first-class match for Essex and also helped them clinch the Totesport League Title for the first time in 20 years. The end of the season saw Cook finish with an average of 48.03 in the County Championship, hitting four centuries.

=== Essex and England (2006–2018) ===
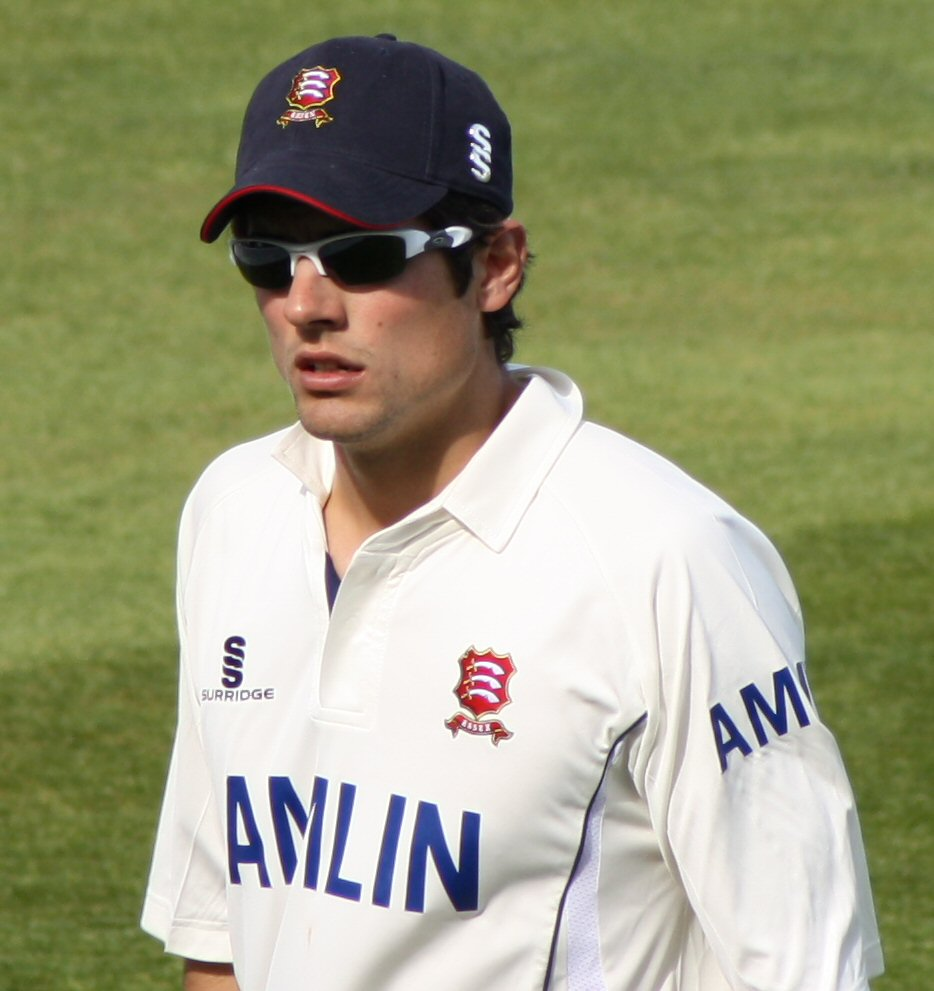
Cook playing for Essex in 2010

After his England call up, Cook's appearances at Essex significantly reduced. In the County Championship he appeared in only three matches, making two hundreds and another two fifties in his five innings, topping the season averages with an inflated 141.3. Similarly in the Cheltenham & Gloucester Trophy he appeared only three times and again topped the batting averages, only being out once with a top score of 91 and average of 148. He scored less favourably in his one Twenty20 Cup appearance, scoring only nine runs.

In the 2007 season, for Essex alone his first-class average was only 58.8 from three appearances, making two hundreds but countering this with one duck and he made a similar century/duck appearance in the (formerly C&G) Friends Provident Trophy during his 5 matches averaging 38.4. The back to back Totesport/Pro40 champions saw Cook make only one appearance in that competition, scoring 81 not out, before being relegated. They won Division Two and were promoted the following season, though Cook only provided 11 runs in one innings during the tournament.

Despite his international commitments Cook managed to participate in at least one match of each tournament averaging 36.16 in three County Championship matches and 15 in his one Twenty20 match. Given time off the South Africa One-Day series, Cook fared better in the FP Trophy with 45.3 from 3 matches including contributing the second-highest in the final at Lord's to seal the trophy.

The 2009 English season featured an early Test series against the West Indies where, despite being in the Test team, Cook joined Essex in a tour match. He scored 76 not out in the second innings before the match was rained off, stopping Essex pressing for victory. Before the Test series, he helped Essex force the follow on against Kent in the County Championship but faltered with his team, scoring only 4 in the second innings to lose by 192 runs.

After the Test series, Cook was omitted from the one day team leaving him free to play for Essex. He joined them in their bid to defend their Friends Provident Trophy matching Varun Chopra's 65 in a 124 run partnership against Lancashire to gain a place in the semi-final. He and his team could not recreate the same form for the semi-final, at the same location against the same team three days later, after being caught from a running catch by Sajid Mahmood, seeing the team lose by 67 runs. Having been knocked out of the FP Trophy, the team turned to the Twenty20 Cup. Making only his fourth appearance in the tournament since 2005, Cook hit 80 off 56 balls in a match against Kent that was rained off.

While his England partner, Bopara scored 45 against Sussex, Cook only scored one but made up for this with a 60 run partnership with Bopara days later to put Essex top of the table. Despite averaging 49 from these four games, Cook felt he was a long way from the international squad. In his last performance before joining the Ashes squad, Cook scored a 57 ball century, and batted throughout the whole innings as they beat Surrey, but without Cook and Bopara, the team were knocked out after two successive losses.

=== Post-England ===
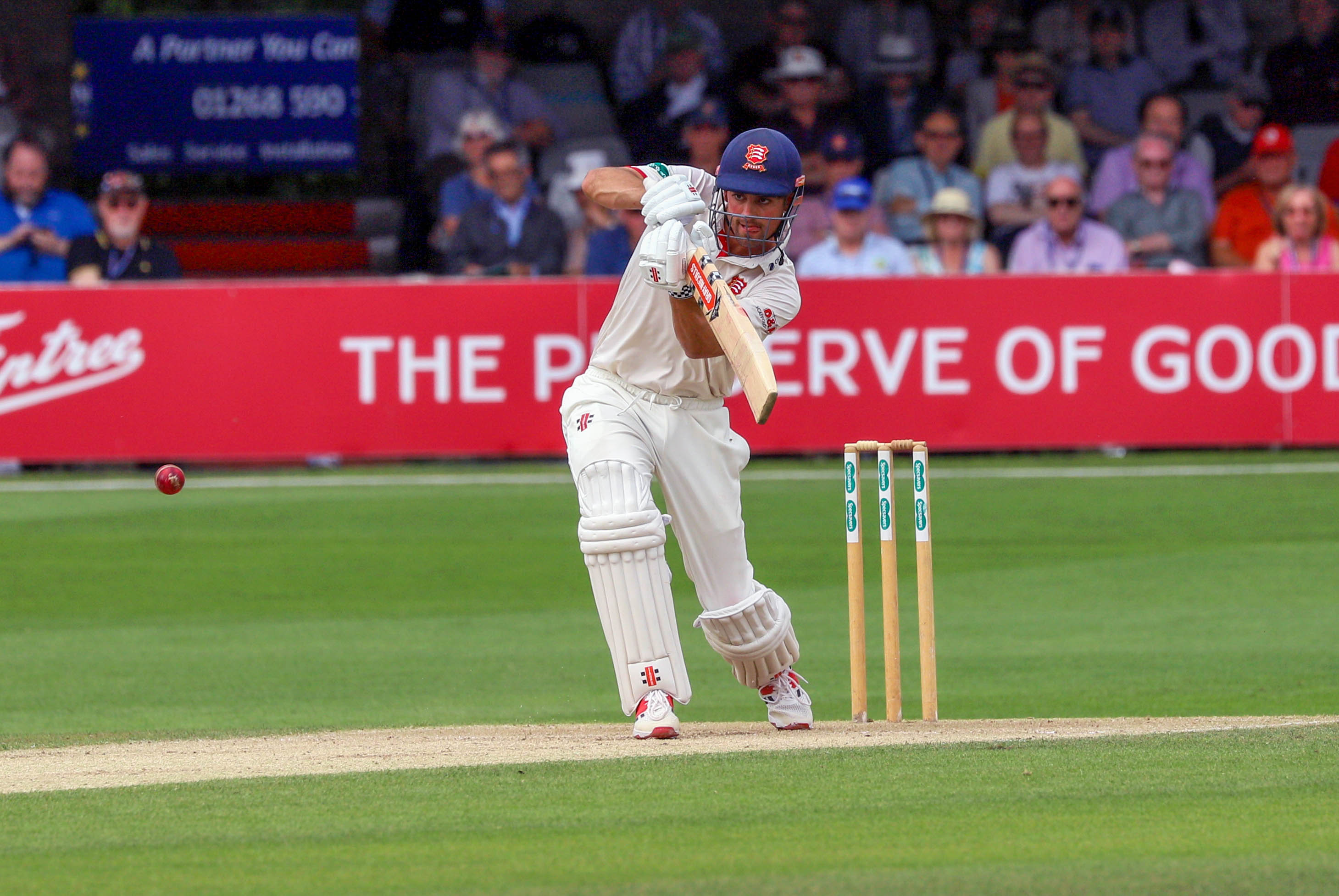
Cook batting for Essex in 2019

When Cook retired from international cricket in 2018, he stated that he would continue to play for Essex, signing a three-year contract with them. In the 2019 County Championship season Cook helped Essex to win the title In August 2020, during the 2020 Bob Willis Trophy, Cook scored his 24,000th run in first-class cricket. In April 2022, on the opening day of the 2022 County Championship, Cook scored his 70th century in first-class cricket.

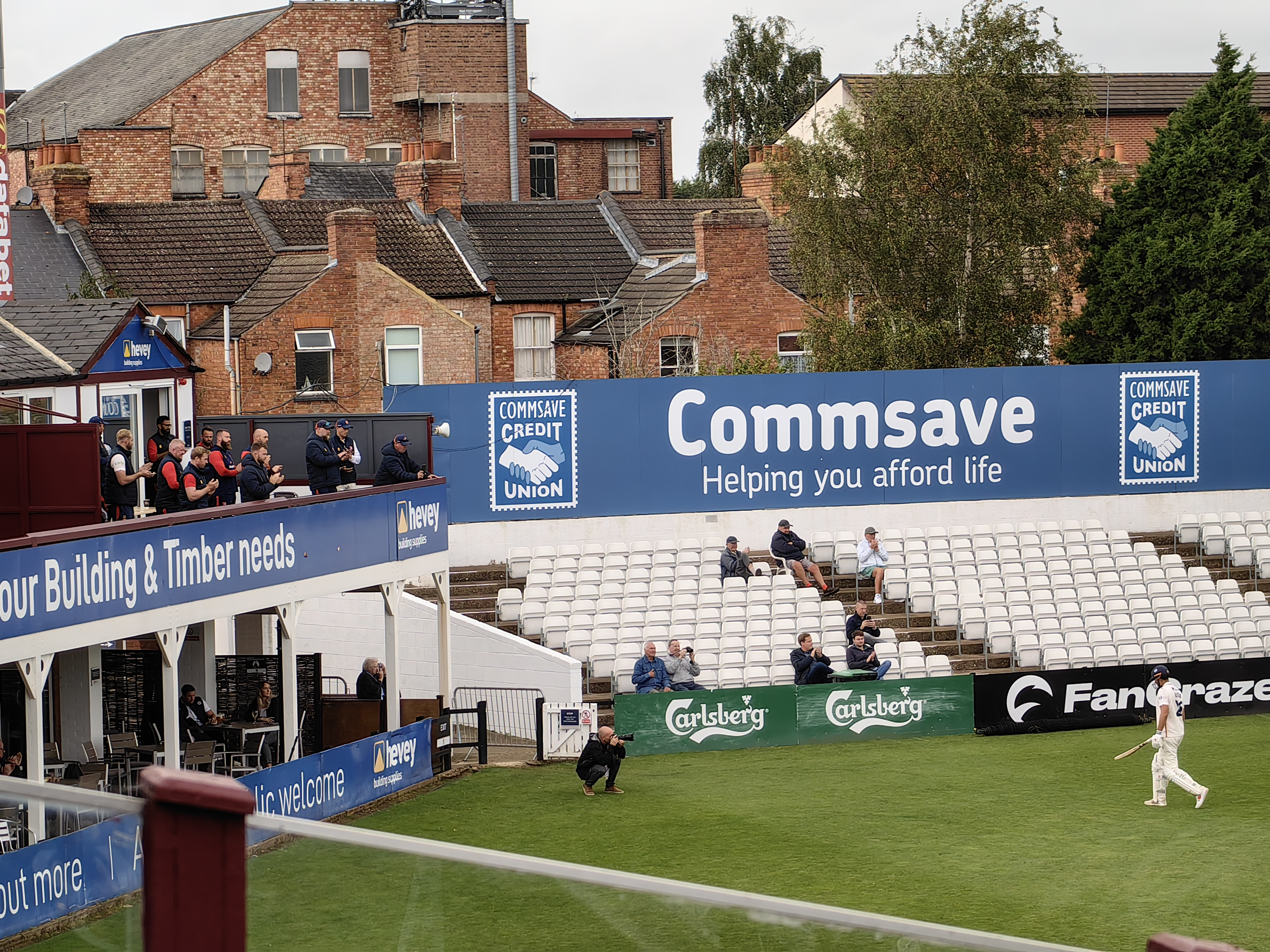
Cook leaving the field after his final innings vs Northants CCC

== England youth ==
Cook had his first taste of international cricket playing the U15 World Cup in 2000. Three years later Cook was called up to the England Under-19 team for their tour of South Africa. After it was decided Samit Patel had enough responsibility batting and bowling, Cook was appointed captain of the team the following year, 2004. His first call of duty was the U19 World Cup in the West Indies where he guided England through the group stages and on past the Super League stage, including an unbeaten century-each partnership with Patel against New Zealand, and continued a 100% win record with 87 over eventual winners Pakistan before falling short in the semi-final against the West Indies. He went on from there to captain them in a U19 Test win over Bangladesh before taking the One-Day series too. His career with the Under 19 team was cut short when Kevin Pietersen was called up to replace Andrew Flintoff in the main team, leaving a spot in England A tour of Sri Lanka for Cook.

After the 2005 domestic season he was part of the intake for the ECB National Academy, but this was interrupted as he flew to Pakistan to cover the squad for Michael Vaughan's knee injury. After not being used in the first XI he travelled back with the academy to the West Indies in the new year scoring 101 in a two-day match against Antigua before youth cricket came to an abrupt halt for Cook.

== England ==
=== 2006: India and Sri Lanka ===
Cook was included in the ECB National Academy in the winter of 2005–06. The academy's tour of the West Indies was cut short on 24 February for Cook who only appeared in the first innings, scoring only 6, before being called up, alongside James Anderson and Owais Shah, to the England tour of India to replace captain Michael Vaughan, who was suffering from a knee injury, and opener Marcus Trescothick, who was suffering from stress. Unlike Shah and Anderson, Cook was welcomed straight into the England XI and made his Test debut aged 21, days after he had flown in from the West Indies. He made an instant impact, opening with Andrew Strauss and scoring a half century in the first innings before being bowled just before tea on the first day for 60 runs from 160 balls being the second top scorer after 134 from Paul Collingwood. During the second innings, he went on to score 104 not out before England declared, making him the sixteenth Englishman to score a century on his debut Test and an even more exclusive list of five to score 100 and 50 in their first Test. His hundred was also the 3,000th century in Test cricket. An impending declaration forced Cook to play quickly to bring up the century; regardless, the match was drawn. After a mediocre outing in the losing second Test, scoring 17 and 2, he missed the Third Test due to a stomach illness and was omitted from the one-day series.

Returning home, Cook was again selected for the first XI during Sri Lanka's tour. For his debut match at Lord's, Cook was shuffled down to third to make way for the returning Trescothick. However, he still walked to the crease alongside his teammate as Strauss fell at the stroke of lunch. Cook and Trescothick put on 127 in their partnership as Trescothick made a century while Cook later stumbled just before at 89; there was no second innings as England enforced the follow-on but were one wicket away from victory, with Cook being targeted among others for two significant dropped catches. Cook's first taste of victory came in the second Test, guiding the team past the target of 78 in the second innings with an unbeaten 34 alongside Andrew Flintoff furthering the reputation of his calm, meticulous style of play against the dangerous spin of Muttiah Muralitharan who took 4–29. Although not initially selected for the one-day series, Cook made his limited overs debut in the fourth match scoring 39 from 38 balls in a bright spot of an otherwise dour England performance hampered by injuries.

=== 2006: Pakistan and Australia ===
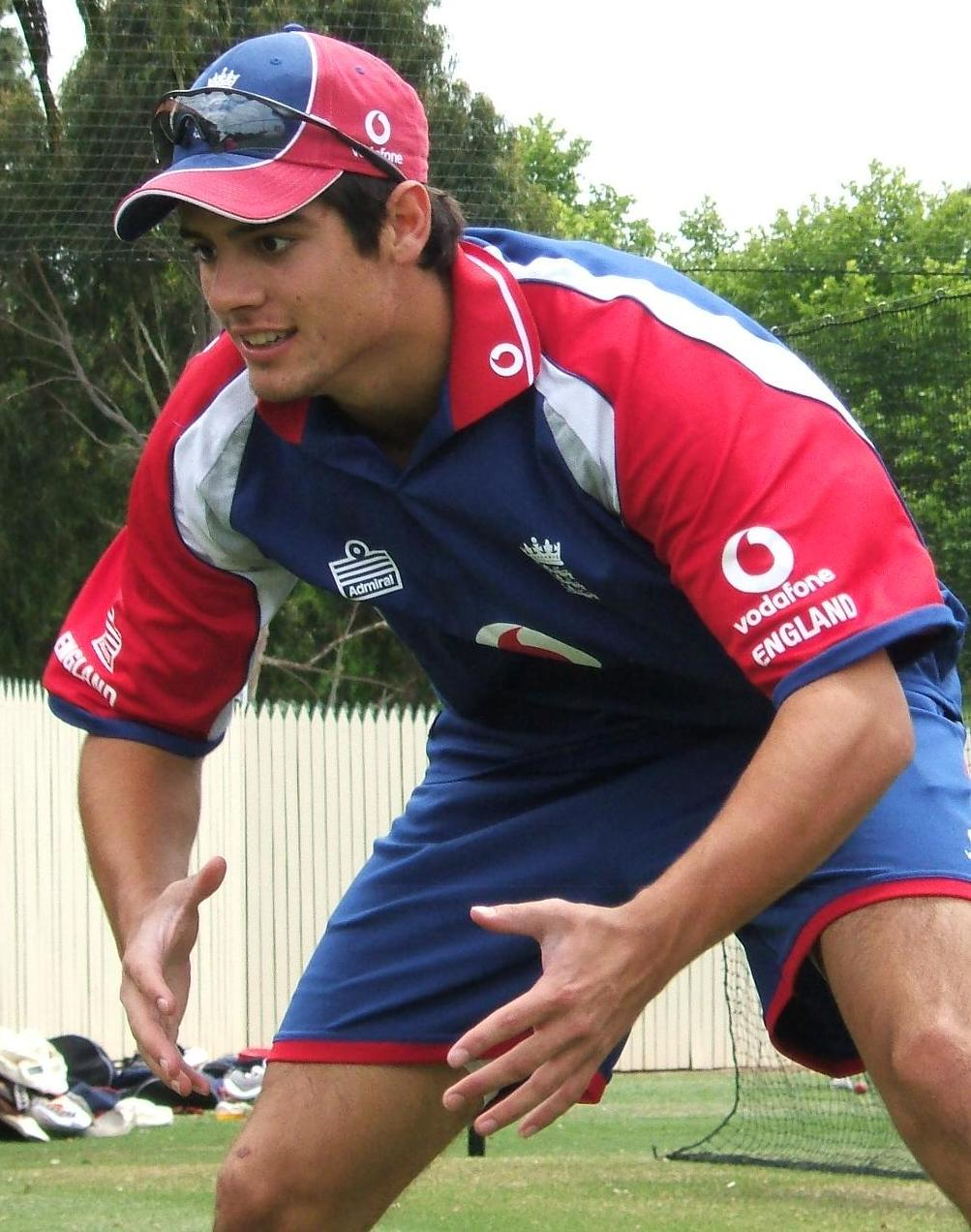
Cook in catching practice during the 2006–07 Ashes tour

At the start of the following series against Pakistan, Cook recorded his second Test century, gaining him a spot on the boards at Lord's alongside Ian Bell and Collingwood. He and Bell both recorded back to back centuries by the following Test at Old Trafford as well as Cook scoring his then-career best 127 in an innings defeat over Pakistan. In what now seemed a pattern, Cook's century came up while partnering with Collingwood as with his previous two. In the controversial forfeited Test, sometimes called Ovalgate, Cook contributed a first innings top score of 40 and second best 83 before Pakistan refused to return to the field. This score secured Cook's tally of runs, 403, as the second-highest scorer for England and third overall in the series. Once again Cook was overlooked in the one day series. At the end of the season he was again awarded the Young Player of the Year award as well as being shortlisted for ICC Emerging Player of the Year.

As well as the one day series against Pakistan, Cook was overlooked for the 2006 Champions Trophy squad. However, he was named for the 2006–07 Ashes series touring party and when Trescothick pulled out once again due to stress, Cook re-earned a spot as an opener for the foreseeable future. In the disastrous 5 Test whitewash, Cook failed to impress in the first two Tests, but during a two-day warm-up he retired with a century and afterwards remained adamant that he and England would make a turn around in the series. With England desperately chasing 577 runs, or a draw to not lose the Ashes, Cook stayed at the crease for over six hours, lasting almost all of the fourth day to earn his maiden Ashes century (119) before being caught behind off Glenn McGrath just shy of three overs before the close of play. This was his fourth Test century before turning 22, no England player had scored more than two by the same age. With only three other batsmen scoring double figures, England lost the Test and the Ashes and despite only having an average of 27.6 runs, Cook scored one of only three English centuries on the tour and also on 28 December 2006 in Melbourne, Cook scored his thousandth Test run, the second cricketer to do this in their maiden year, after Mark Taylor.

For his performances in 2006, he was named in the World Test XI by Cricinfo.

=== 2007: West Indies, India and Sri Lanka ===
Cook's results in international matches
	Matches	Won	Lost	Drawn	Tied	No result
Test	135	57	41	36	0	–
ODI	92	44	44	-	2	2
T20I	4	2	2	–	-	-

After being omitted for the Twenty20 International against Australia and the 2007 World Cup, Cook found himself once again in favour for the home series against West Indies. Starting at Lord's, Cook found himself among four centurions in the opening innings with Collingwood opposite him once again, being one of only five Englishmen to hit as many centuries in 15 Tests and recorded another half century in the following innings to win his first Man of The Match award. After another half century in the second Test, Cook recorded another half century/century combination in the two innings at Old Trafford, his first innings sixty equating to the team's win margin. Cook was selected for his first Twenty20 International against the West Indies, in a losing effort where he scored 15 runs from 16 balls. This was followed by a disappointing one-day series for Cook, and England, who averaged 22 in 3 matches.

The following home series against India saw Cook continue his fine Test form despite England not winning a Test. He was the third-highest scoring Englishman with an average of 37. In the first Test, Cook made scores of 36 and 17 as the match ended in a draw. During the first day of the second Test at Trent Bridge, Cook became the youngest English player to rack up 1,500 Test runs eclipsing the record held by David Gower. In the first innings of the third Test, Cook made his biggest score of the series, 61 and followed this up with 43 in the second innings to help England secure a draw. Cook played in six of the seven ensuing one-day matches, scoring his maiden ODI century in the first match alongside Ian Bell's 126 not out guiding England to a 104 win victory that propped up England's first one-day series victory since 2005. After two ducks, Cook was dropped in the final, decisive match.

After being omitted from the World Twenty20 Cook rejoined England in Sri Lanka making an outstanding contribution in both forms of the game. Starting with another ODI series victory, Cook battled with a stomach virus to top score 47 in a losing match and went on to be the second-highest scoring batsmen in the series behind Chamara Silva with 155. Cook also picked up his first ODI Man of The Match award in the fourth game after scoring 80 to help England win by five wickets. After an unsuccessful first Test, Cook went on to be the top scoring Test batsmen for England too, scoring two half centuries in the second Test and 118 in the third match, at an average of 46. Up until this tour, Cook had held a strange record of having more Test centuries than half centuries but this century marked his last until March 2009 and Cook came under increasing criticism for his lack of ability to convert fifties to hundreds at the top of the order, yet maintained an average in the low forties.

=== 2008: New Zealand, South Africa and India ===
England's tour of the antipodes continued with the tour of New Zealand and Cook made a great start in the warm up matches, making a half century followed by an unbeaten 138 the following day in limited overs matches. His style was still considered too slow for the following two Twenty20 Internationals and he failed to continue his form in the first ODI where he fell for 11 as part of an England collapse. The second match saw a similar collapse by England where Cook's 52 was the only real contribution until he was run out by regular Essex team-mate Ravi Bopara. The fourth one-day match saw Cook and Phil Mustard prop up the innings with an opening stand of 158 before both being dismissed in successive balls, leading to a tied match.

Although normally known for his slow but focussed repose with the bat, the first Test against New Zealand gave Cook a chance making three sharp catches in the first innings and mirroring his efforts with three even more spectacular catches in the second innings, the first two off Ryan Sidebottom who then went on to make a hat-trick with a final LBW, the match itself saw England collapse in the second innings for 110 with Cook being the only other player besides Ian Bell to make it into double figures. Incidentally, Cook's other catch in the second innings was also off Sidebottom to dismiss New Zealand captain Daniel Vettori, a feat the pair reproduced in the second innings of the second Test and again in the first innings of the third Test. His batting meanwhile began its long road of decline scoring no more than sixty in the two Tests and falling for only two runs in the final match, though in the second Test he did secure another English record being the youngest Englishman at just over 23 years, to score 2,000 Test runs – again eclipsing Gower; two days later he recorded his first Test six after 2047 runs, including 233 boundaries, after an accidental top edge and ruined his chances of beating Vijay Manjrekar's 2,308 record.

Back home in England Cook failed to reproduce his legacy of Lord's centuries. Scoring 61 in the only England innings of the first Test which was his only score over fifty from the four innings in England's successful series. His poor form in the long format led to him being omitted for the Twenty20 series and all but the final one-day match.

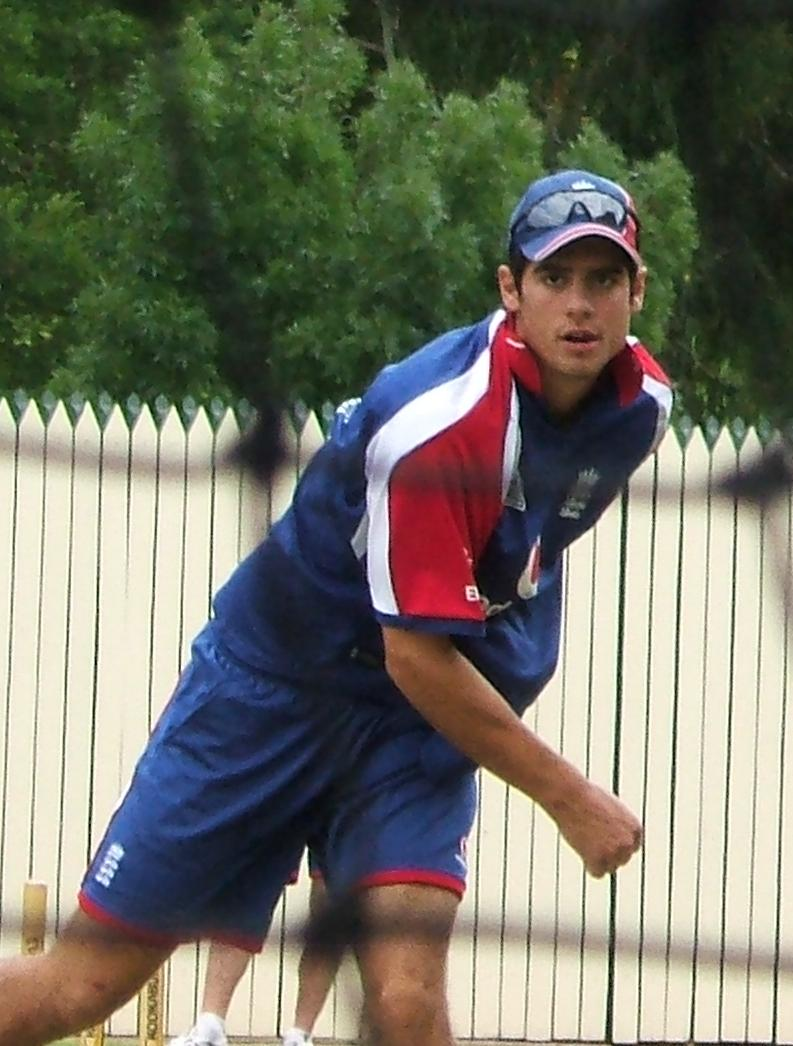
Cook bowled his first Test over against South Africa at Lord's.

With a year to go before the 2009 Ashes, it was imperative for Cook to cement his position as opener in the home series against South Africa. Again, at Lord's, Cook made his way comfortably to a half-century before being dismissed for 60. A high team score, together with a benevolent wicket, saw the fifth day bring Cook's first Test over as a bowler: he conceded just one run. Cook fell in one innings of each Test between fifty and a hundred, amassing the considerable average of 47 for the series.

Once again Cook found himself omitted from the Twenty20 and one-day team both for the home series against South Africa as well as the majority of the away series in India, where a string of poor England performances saw him called up for the fifth and ultimately the final match after the terrorist attacks in Mumbai. When the Tests arrived, Cook continued to notch a half-century in one innings of each match, but was outshone by opening partner Strauss's centuries.

=== 2009: West Indies and Australia ===
After India, England toured the West Indies under the new captaincy of Andrew Strauss after Pietersen's brief tenure ended in controversy. Cook was shown still to have the selectors' confidence despite his lack of centuries when he was given the unofficial vice-captaincy before the tour began. The title gave him a boost: he went on to score two fifties in the first warm-up match, retiring out in the second innings but contrasted that with a duck in the next tour match. Similarly, in the First Test he scored four and another duck.

After the third Test was abandoned due to the poor quality of the surface, Cook was again beleaguered by his perennial problem: he scored two half centuries against opening partner Strauss's 169. He seemed to have put it behind him in the first innings of the next Test, however, as he and Strauss put on a record opening stand of 229. Strauss was bowled first for 169 as Cook reached the nineties but fell shortly thereafter for 94. After two days' batting on a benign pitch, the West Indies declared on 749 for nine in response to England's 600 for six. Put back in with one day to spare, Strauss fell for 33, but, after 38 innings' and fifteen months' waiting, Cook finally arrived at his eighth Test century, and went on to pass his highest score with an unbeaten 139 before play ended in a draw. During this innings, Cook also became the youngest Englishman to pass 3,000 Test runs.

England returned home, only to face the West Indies once more. The Second Test took the teams to the Riverside in Durham where, on a benign surface, Cook battled through the first day. After Strauss fell in the morning session, Cook began a partnership with Ravi Bopara, who had recently been promoted to third in the batting order. Over the first day, the two navigated a slow partnership, both strike rates remaining under 55, but, once Cook reached his ninth Test century, Bopara matched it with his own, culminating in a 213-run partnership at Bopara's fall in the closing overs of the day; Cook ended unbeaten on 126. After the second day of play was completely washed out, Cook recorded his first Test 150 and subsequently his then-highest score of 160. Omitted from the World Twenty20 competition, Cook returned to Essex for two moderate county matches but impressive Twenty20 games.

Despite being the only Englishman to score a century, or even more than 50, in the first innings of England's warm up match against Warwickshire, in the first Ashes Test at Cardiff, Cook was the lowest scoring recognised batsman, scoring 10 and 6 – caught in the gully in the first innings, and trapped LBW by Mitchell Johnson in the second. Cook bounced back in the second Test at Lord's, batting through to the afternoon session, as he and his captain Andrew Strauss (who scored 161) set the record for the highest opening English partnership at Lord's with 196, Cook initially scored faster than Strauss but fell short of another Lord's century, trapped again by Johnson for 95.

This partnership, along with Strauss' anchoring throughout the innings, led England to a total of 425 and enabled them to gain a 210-run first-innings lead, aided by three catches from Cook off James Anderson and Stuart Broad. Batting quickly in the second innings to force victory, Cook scored 32 from 54 balls before again falling LBW but providing enough for England to cement their first victory over Australia at Lord's since 1934 and second since 1896.

After this high, the series took a severe downturn for Cook as his only appearance in the third Test was a duck. With no second innings to redeem himself, pressure began to mount on Cook for the fourth Test at Headingley where he anchored himself through half the team before being dismissed half-way through the first innings for only 30, a score which would only be topped by wicket-keeper Matt Prior as England collapsed to Australia's seam attack, bowled out for 102. Though the team batted better in the second innings Cook again was the fifth man out for another 30 as England succumbed to an innings defeat, with Australia levelling the series needing only to draw at the Oval to retain the Ashes. During the fortnight break Cook was among a quintet of players released into the County Championship to increase their form alongside.

In the first-class match against Middlesex both he and Bopara failed in the first innings, with scores of 4 and 1, but Cook top scored in the second innings with 64 to push Essex towards victory. Of the five released, Cook was among three picked for the final and decisive Oval Test and didn't start well being dismissed with only 12 runs on the board, ten of them his. However, in the field Cook was part of Australia's first innings collapse, taking two catches off Graeme Swann to dismiss the top scoring opener Simon Katich and the penultimate wicket of Stuart Clark. Working with a 172 run lead on the second evening, Strauss and Cook's steady partnership was ended prematurely with Cook dismissed for 9 in his final innings of the series. Despite this Cook ended the series on something of a high in his fielding position at short leg, taking a catch off Steve Harmison's second wicket in two balls for the penultimate wicket and then taking the winning catch of a leading edge from the defiant Michael Hussey for 121 off Swann to seal the Ashes victory.

=== 2009–10: South Africa and Bangladesh ===
Cook made his return to international Twenty20 cricket during the tour of South Africa in 2009–10. After scoring 11 runs in the first match, Cook was handed the captaincy after Paul Collingwood picked up an injury prior to the second match but led them to an 84 run loss after posting only 26. In the second Test he scored a patient 118 after being saved by a third umpire referral at 64. This, along with a century from Ian Bell, gave England their only Test win of the drawn series with an innings margin. Despite a meagre performance in the rest of the series, it was quickly announced that England's 2010 tour against Bangladesh would see Strauss rested, with Cook taking on the captaincy role in the Test and One-Day teams as, what national selector Geoff Miller, "an audition for future engagements".

In his first Test as captain in Chittagong, Cook led the team to a win, despite a strong rearguard from Bangladesh, with the top score in both innings. Scoring a century in the first, in the second innings he accumulated 4,000 Test which coincided with teammate Collingwood achieving the same. At 25 years, 79 days Cook became the youngest Englishman to reach this amount and the second youngest worldwide after Indian veteran Sachin Tendulkar who was 24 years, 224 days old. In the second Test, Cook scored the winning runs in a nine wicket win, having scored another century. By virtue of being captain, Cook returned to England's ODI squad for the first time since 2008 and led the team as an opening batsmen to a three win whitewash with respectable scores.

After England's successful tour of Bangladesh, Bangladesh came to tour England with Strauss returning as captain and Cook being omitted once more for the short format. Cook was unable to reproduce the good form he showed as captain, making scores of seven and 23 in the first Test before being dismissed for 29 in the second Test between the two teams.

=== 2010–11: Pakistan and Australia ===
Later in the summer Pakistan toured England also. In the first Test Cook was unimpressive, making scores of 8 and twelve, although England went on to win the match by 354 runs. Cook's form did not improve in the next match where he made scores of 17 and four. It took until the fifth Test of the summer and the third Test against Pakistan for Cook to pass 50, scoring 110 in a losing cause against Pakistan. Before then, he had come in for much scrutiny, especially regarding his technique outside off-stump, and many considered his place to be under-threat. His timely century secured his place for the last Test, although he only scored 10 in an innings win by England, further putting his place into question heading into the winter tour of Australia.

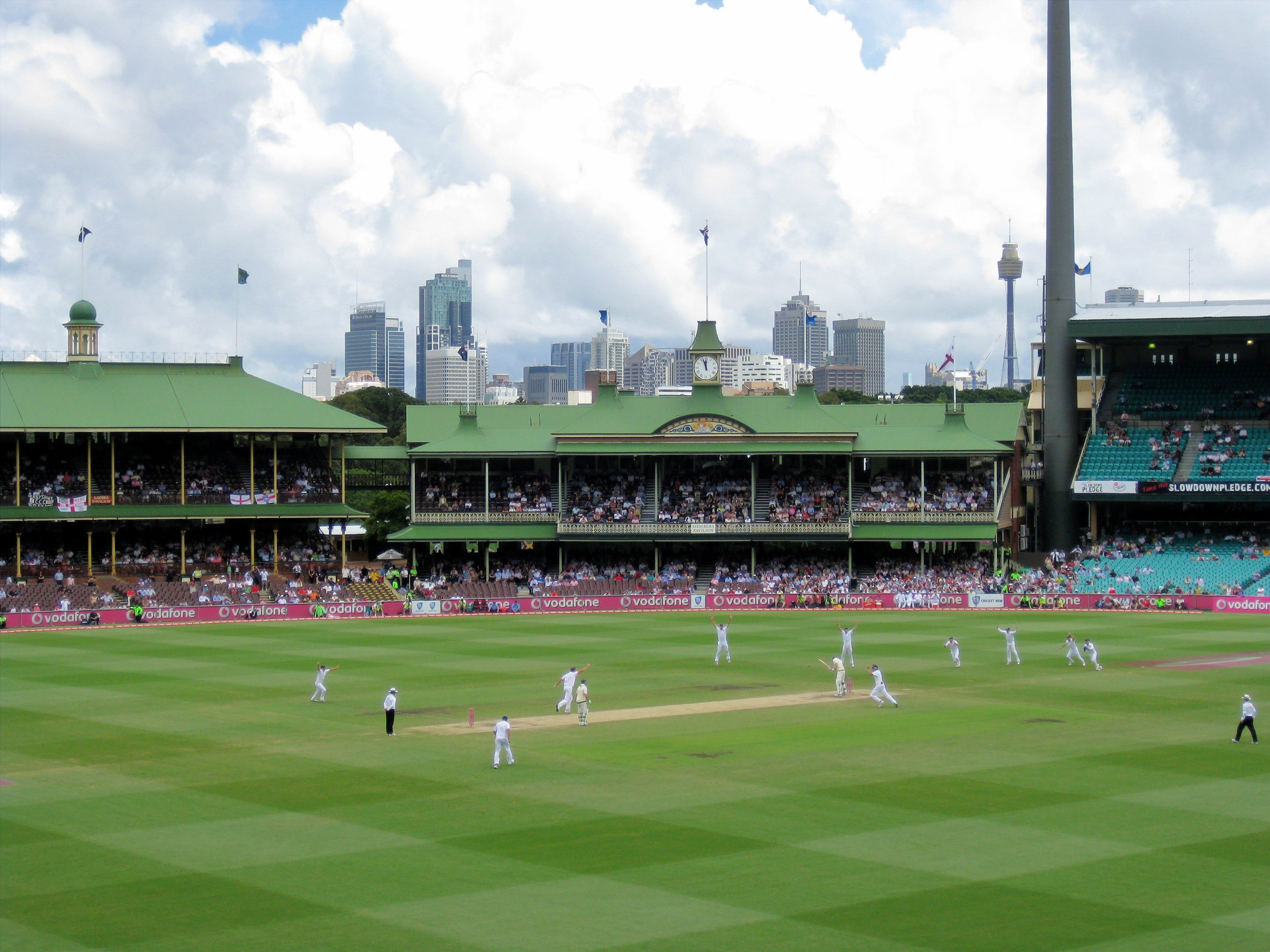
Cook and his fellow England teammates celebrate in the field as Chris Tremlett takes the winning wicket in the 2010–11 Ashes series.

Although there were still concerns about Cook's form and technique ahead of the 2010–11 Ashes series, Cook answered his critics in the best way possible. Following a century in one of the warm-up games, Cook opened his series account with 67 as England won the toss and batted at the Gabba in Brisbane. After surrendering a first-innings deficit of 221, Cook fought back with fellow-opener Strauss and Jonathan Trott. Strauss scored 110 as England scored 188 for the first wicket. With this partnership, Cook and Strauss became England's highest scoring opening partners across their four years together, beating an eighty-year-old record set by Jack Hobbs and Herbert Sutcliffe; albeit taking 44 more innings to do so. Cook was joined by Trott and they scored an unbeaten partnership of 329; Cook recorded his first double-century in first-class cricket, finishing on 235 not out, and Trott scored 135 not out before England declared on 517–1. Cook's 235* overtook Don Bradman's record score at the ground and several other records were set in that innings.

In the second Test at Adelaide, Cook scored another century, his 15th, which saw him match Bradman in scoring 15 centuries before his 26th birthday. Cook broke Wally Hammond's record of runs scored without being out and Nasser Hussain's record of most minutes at the crease without being out, before being caught behind off an inside edge for 148 after over 1,000 minutes of being at the crease.

Cook, along with his teammates in a losing effort, performed poorly in the third Test but contributed to an innings victory in the fourth, becoming the series' leading run scorer after scoring 82. In the fifth and final Test, Cook twice survived being given out by debutant Michael Beer, the first from a no ball and the second (at 99 runs) after the third umpire confirmed the onfield decision that the ball had not carried. Eventually caught by Michael Hussey, his score of 189 saw him reach 5,000 Test runs in his career while in the series alone he amounted over 36 hours at the crease, a world record in a five Test series and an English record even including six Test series, as well as scoring 766 runs to become England's second-highest series scorer behind 906 by Wally Hammond 80 years previous. At the end of the final Test, Cook was presented with both the Man of the Match and Man of the Series awards.

Cook in the 2010–11 Ashes series
No.	Venue	1st inns	2nd inns	Match result
1	Brisbane	67 (168)	235* (428)	Match drawn
2	Adelaide	148 (269)		England won by inns & 71 runs
3	Perth	32 (63)	13 (16)	Australia won by 267 runs
4	Melbourne	82 (152)		England won by inns & 157 runs
5	Sydney	189 (342)		England won by inns & 83 runs
Total		766 runs, ave. 127.66, 3 centuries, 2 fifties		

=== 2011: World Cup, Sri Lanka and India ===
Following England's quarter-final departure from the 2011 World Cup, Andrew Strauss resigned the ODI captaincy and Cook was named his successor, despite not having featured in an ODI since leading the team in Bangladesh. In addition to Cook's promotion, seam bowler Stuart Broad was named captain of the Twenty20 team and England went into the home series with Sri Lanka with different captains for each format of the game.

In the Test series against Sri Lanka Cook made 133 in the first Test of the series to help England take a 1–0 lead. His good form continues into the next match where he made scores of 96 and 106. In the final match of the series Cook made 55 in his only innings of the match, meaning he had scored two centuries and two half centuries in his four innings. Cook's first game as full-time captain against Sri Lanka at the Oval saw England victorious by 110 runs. England went on to win the series 3–2, with Cook top scoring for England in the series with 298 runs in five matches. This performance also led to an ODI player of the series award.

Cook was expected to be a key player when England met India, with the series winners taking over the world number one spot. Although Cook failed to make a significant score in the first game, England won the match to go 1–0 up. Cook only scored seven runs in the entire match in the next game, although England again won to go 2–0 up. In the third match of the series Cook hit a brilliant 294 to help England win the game by an innings and clinch the World's number one spot. In the final match of the series he made 34 as England won the series 4–0. In the second ODI Cook made an unbeaten 80 to help guide England to victory. After making scores of 23 and 12 in the next two matches, Cook finished off the series in good form, making 50 in the final game as England won by six wickets.

For his performances in 2011, he was named in the World Test XI by the ICC and Cricinfo.

England then travelled to India for a limited overs series overseas. Cook scored 60 in the first match but England lost by 126 runs. He scored just 13 runs in the next three games, which included being dismissed for a duck. In the final match of the series he returned to form, making 60. However, England again lost and suffered a 5–0 series defeat.

=== 2012: Pakistan, Sri Lanka and West Indies ===
In the winter of 2012, England struggled in Test matches in the sub continent. They were beaten by Pakistan in the first match of the series, with Cook being dismissed for single figures in both innings. He made 94 in the next game, the only time he passed 50 in the tour, but it was not enough to prevent England losing the match and going 2–0 down. Cook was out cheaply in the first innings as England were again bowled out for less than 200, and although he made 49 in the next innings it wasn't enough to prevent another England defeat.

In the first Test against Sri Lanka England's form showed no sign of improving and they lost the first match of the series, with Cook being dismissed for a duck in the first innings. With the pressure on England going into the final match of the two Test series, Cook returned to his best, making 94 in the first innings before hitting an unbeaten 49 to help England level the series at 1–1.

Back at home against the West Indies, Cook continued to perform well, hitting a half century in the first match of the series. England went on to win the match by five wickets. They also won the next match of the series, with Cook performing well and making an unbeaten 43 in England's second innings to help guide them to victory. The final match of the series ended in a draw. After being dismissed for a duck in the first ODI, Cook made a superb 112 in the second to help England win the match by 8 wickets.

=== 2012–13: South Africa and India ===
England struggled in the three match series against South Africa, eventually losing the series 2–0. Cook started the series well, making yet another century in the first innings of the first match between the two teams. However, he was dismissed for a duck in the second innings as South Africa took a 1–0 lead. The next match ended in a draw, with Cook making decent contributions, despite failing to pass fifty. The third match was over shadowed when Kevin Pietersen was dropped following an argument with senior England players. Cook scored just ten runs in the match as England lost to lose the series 2–0 and lose their spot at the top of the Test rankings. Cook had an unsuccessful ODI series, the only 50 he made coming in the final match of the series. England lost the match and series finished 2–2.

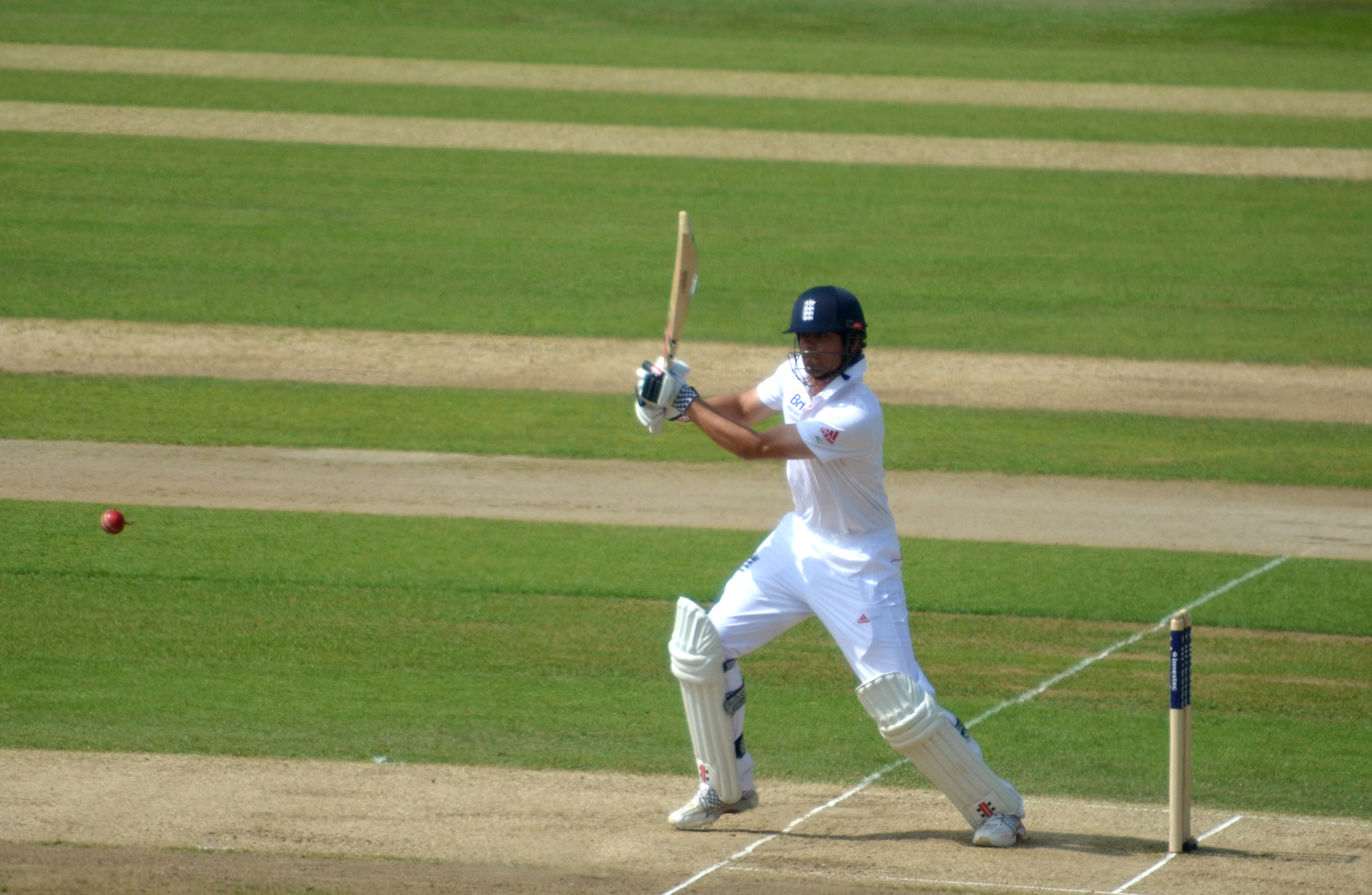
Cook batting during the third Test during the 2013 Ashes in England. England won the series 3–0; it was Cook's first Ashes series as captain.

On 29 August 2012, Cook became England's Test captain after previous Test captain Andrew Strauss retired from all forms of cricket.

Cook, who captained England in Bangladesh for two Tests in a previous series, took charge of England for the Test series against India in the winter of 2012. In each of the first three Tests – the first a defeat and the second a ten-wicket victory – he scored a century. This, together with a century in each of the aforementioned two Tests in Bangladesh, gave Cook five centuries in five Tests as captain, a record number. His scores on the tour also included 119 and 97 in the warm-up matches. The ten-wicket victory in the second Test was lauded by the media as one of England's greatest victories, and Cook's run of hundreds brought him level with the English Test record for most centuries. On 6 December 2012, Cook became England's leading scorer of centuries after making a hundred against India in Kolkata.

On 7 December 2012 he captained England to its first Test series victory on Indian soil since 1984–85, as well as overtaking Mike Gatting as England's highest ever run scorer in India For his performances in 2012, he was named both in the World Test XI and ODI XI by the ICC. He was also named in the World Test XI by the Cricinfo.

Cook continued his impressive form in the ODI series, scoring 75 in the first match, which helped England win the game. Cook was less impressive in the next two games as India took a lead in the series after winning both games. Cook made 74 in the fourth game but England still lost and India took an unassailable 3–1 series lead. England won the last game meaning the series had finished 3–2 to India, meaning the tour was seen as a success and the transition from Strauss to Cook was seen as a smooth one.

=== 2013: New Zealand and Champions Trophy ===
After the tour of India, Cook led England in New Zealand. In the second ODI, Cook hit 78 to guide England to victory and level the series 1–1. England clinched the series by winning the decider, in which Cook made 46 to secure the series for England. In the first Test match, Cook made a century to help England battle to a draw after a poor showing in the first innings. Cook was not at his best in the final two games of the two, although the nature of the wickets meant that the batsmen found it easy to score runs, and so the series ended 0–0. Despite the pitches, many had expected England to win the series and the draw was seen as a disappointment.

Cook led England in the 2013 Champions trophy, and they won their first game against Australia. It was also Cook's first game as captain against Australia. Cook made 59 against Sri Lanka, but England lost the game meaning they were not assured of their place in the next round. Cook top scored with 64 as England narrowly beat New Zealand to book their place in the semi-final. After beating South Africa in the semi-finals, England played India in the final in what turned out to be a rain-affected match. Despite restricting India to 129 in 20 overs, England lost the match by 5 runs, leaving them as runners-up. Cook was named as part of the 'Team of the Tournament' by Cricinfo.

In the first Test against New Zealand on home soil, Cook got made good starts in both innings but was unable to convert these scores past fifty. Despite this England won the Test match. In the second match, Cook returned to form, making 130 and leading England to a 2–0 series win. This meant that England remained undefeated in Test series under Cook, winning two and drawing one. Cook played in the ODI series, despite calls for him to be rested ahead of the Ashes. He made scores of 30, 34 and 0 in the three match series, with England losing 2–1.

=== 2013–14: Back-to-back Ashes series ===
The 2013 home Ashes series marked Cook's first Ashes series as captain. England went into the series as strong favourites, with Australia recently having parted company with their coach. England won the first Test, with Cook making 50 in England's second innings to help them set Australia a competitive target to win the game. They were bowled out for 296, meaning England won the match by 14 runs. Although Cook only managed 20 runs in the next match, England cruised to victory, winning by 347 runs. The third match ended in a draw, with Cook scoring 62 in the first innings, but being dismissed for a duck in the second. The fourth Test saw England win the series after winning the match and taking a 3–0 series lead. The final match ended in a draw, with Cook failing to pass fifty in either of his innings. Despite this, Cook was generally praised for the way he had led the team. In the ODI series, Cook and Flower decided to rest several of England's Test players to ensure they were fit for the series in Australia. Cook himself played no part in the series, being replaced in the team by Michael Carberry.

England and Cook suffered a complete whitewash when they travelled to Australia for the 2013–14 Ashes series. They were heavily defeated in the first Test, losing by 381 runs. Cook top-scored in England's second innings with 65 but it wasn't enough as England slumped to defeat. The second match saw a similar humiliation as England lost by 218 runs. England surrendered the urn after losing the third Test, giving Australia a 3–0 series lead. Cook, playing in his 100th Test match, made 72 in the first innings but was dismissed for a platinum duck in the second as England lost their third straight match by over 100 runs. The fourth Test saw Cook make another 50, but it wasn't enough to prevent another heavy defeat. England lost the final match and the series 5–0, with questions being asked of Cook's captaincy. Cook captained England in the ODI series but was unable to make a big contribution as England went 3–0 down. Cook scored 44 in the fourth match as England finally won their first game of the tour. However, they went on to lose the series 4–1. Upon returning from Australia, Andy Flower resigned but Cook vowed to continue as captain and was later backed by the ECB to help to mould a new England team.

For his performances in 2013, he was named as captain of the World Test XI by the ICC.

=== 2014: Sri Lanka and India ===
Cook continued in his role as captain for the home series against Sri Lanka. In the first ODI of the series he made just 11 runs. He followed this up with an unbeaten 30 in the third match and guided England to a ten wicket victory. He was out for just one in the next match as Sri Lanka levelled the series at 2–2. In the deciding match Cook made 56, his first half century of the summer, although it was not enough to prevent England losing the series 3–2.

Cook continued to struggle for form in the Test series against Sri Lanka, scoring 17 and 28 as England drew the game. Cook was also criticised for not declaring earlier and not giving his bowlers enough time to win the game. England lost the next match, with Cook again failing to pass fifty in either innings, with his high score in the match being 33 in the second innings.

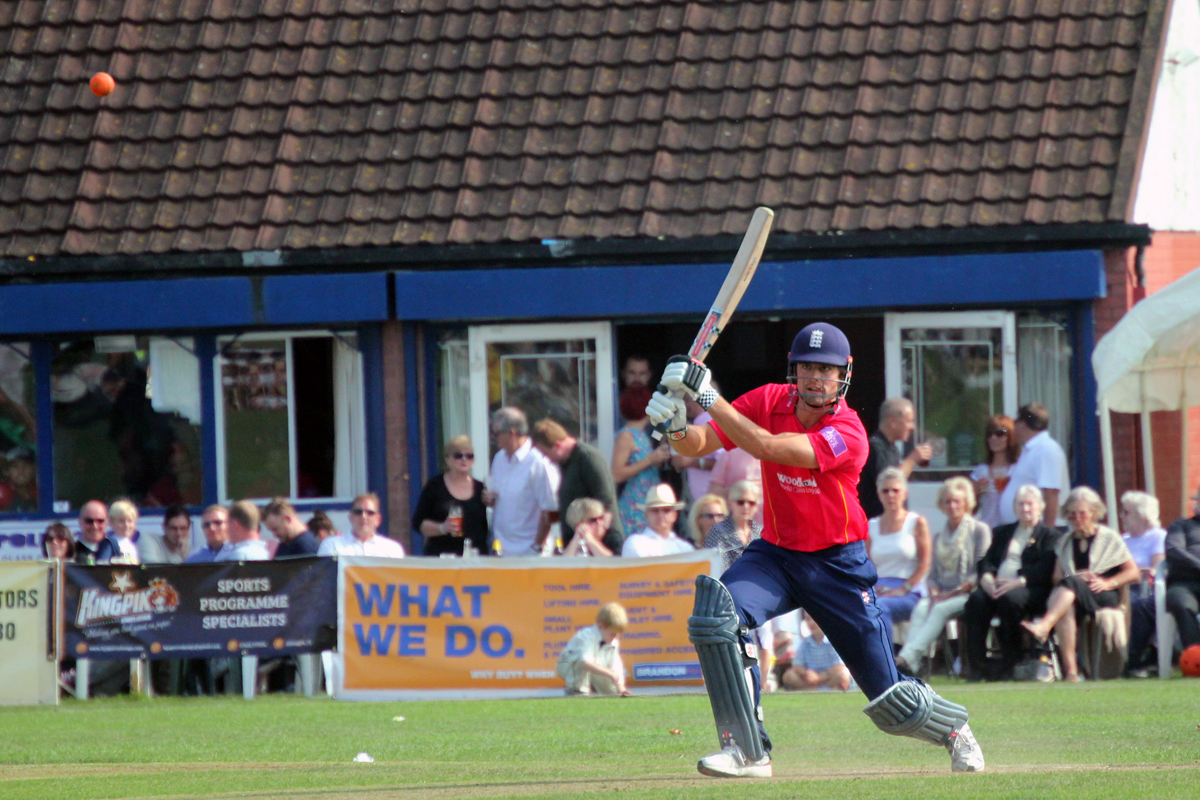
Cook batting for Essex in 2014

Cook went into the Test series against India under pressure following the defeat to Sri Lanka. In the first Test he scored just five runs. However, as the match edged towards a draw, he collected his maiden Test wicket of Ishant Sharma when he was bowling medium pace. Cook's poor form continued in the second Test when he made scores of 10 and 22 as England lost the game to go 1–0 down in the series. On 27 July, in the third Test against India at the Rose Bowl, Cook scored 95 in the first innings which showed that he was getting back in form with confidence before getting out to Ravindra Jadeja. He then went on to score 70 not out in second innings before declaring as England won the match to level the series. Although he only made 17 in the next match, his captaincy was praised as England won the game by an innings to take a 2–1 series lead. Cook made 79 in the final match of the series, which England again won to seal the series 3–1.

Following the win, Cook revealed he had considered his position as captain but was convinced by his wife to continue. After the first match of the ODI series was rained off, Cook made 19 in the second ODI as England suffered a defeat. They went 2–0 down in the series after losing the next game, although Cook batted well, making 44. He made just 9 in the next match as India clinched the series 3–0. Following the defeat questions were asked over Cook's role in the ODI team. However, the team bounced back to win the final game of the series in convincing fashion, with Cook making 46.

Cook captained England for the ODI tour of Sri Lanka. However, he did not perform well in the first two matches, making scores of 10 and 22 as England lost both games. England won the third match, with Cook making 34, although he was later banned for the next game due to a slow over rate. In the fifth match he scored 20, as England won to keep the series alive. However, they lost the last two games, with Cook making scores of 1 and 32. The 5–2 series defeat lead to questions over Cook's leadership of the team.

On 19 December 2014, Cook was removed as one-day captain, and replaced by Eoin Morgan. This was primarily due to his poor form in ODI cricket.

=== 2015: West Indies and New Zealand ===
Cook continued his captaincy of the Test team, having not scored a century since May 2013. In the first Test of the three-Test series, Cook registered scores of only 11 and 13, in an otherwise strong performance from England. The match finished in a draw. Cook took advantage of favourable batting conditions in the following Test, making 76 in an opening partnership of 125 in England's first innings with Jonathan Trott. It was England's first century opening partnership since March 2013, and Cook's innings took him past Alec Stewart to become England's second-highest run-scorer in Tests. In the second innings, Cook made 59* in a comfortable run chase to win the Test by nine wickets and help England to secure 1–0 lead in the three match series. In the third Test in Barbados, Cook scored 105 in England's first innings, his first Test century in almost two years. However he made only 4 in the second innings, as England slumped to 123 all out. West Indies comfortably chased the runs they needed to gain a victory, making the final result for the series 1–1.

The English team then welcomed the Black Caps in May, with the first Test of the two-match series at Lord's. In the first Test, Cook continued his resurgence with his 27th century in Tests, scoring 162 in the second innings as England ultimately made 478 all out. England went on to win the game by 124 runs to go 1–0 up in the series. Cook continued his good form in the second Test. He made 75 in England's first innings as they posted 350 to equal New Zealand's first innings score. New Zealand were able to build up a big lead in their second innings, and although Cook made 56 in the final innings in the match, England lost the match by 199 runs and the series finished tied at 1–1. During the second Test, he became England's leading run scorer in Test matches, as well as the first England player to score 9,000 runs in Tests and the first to score 1,000 Test runs against five different nations.

=== 2015 Ashes ===
Cook captained England in the 2015 Ashes series, and although England won the first game, Cook could only manage scores of 20 in the first innings and 12 in the second. England lost the second Test by 405 runs, but Cook was one of the few England batsman to show any resistance, scoring 96 in England's first innings. With the series level Cook made 34 in England's first innings of the third Test and England went on to win the game by eight wickets. England won the fourth Test by an innings and 78 runs, meaning Cook only needed to bat once, scoring 43 in England's first innings. With the Ashes won, Cook was praised for his captaincy and he gave an emotional interview following the victory. England lost the final match of the series, but Cook was again one of few England batsmen to show any resistance with the bat as he scored 85 in their second innings. Despite the loss, England won the series 3–2 and Cook celebrated his second Ashes win as captain.

=== 2015: Pakistan ===
Cook scored his third double-century and 28th Test ton (263) against Pakistan in first Test at Abu Dhabi in October 2015 in 836 minutes: the longest innings by an Englishman and 3rd longest of all time, facing 528 balls. In doing so he also became the all-time highest non-Asian run-scorer in Asia, overtaking Jacques Kallis' 2,039 runs. Despite Cook's brilliant innings, England were unable to force a victory, running out of time after bad light stopped play. In the second Test Cook scored 65 in the first innings as England posted 242. With England chasing down a big target to win in the second innings, Cook could only manage 10 and Pakistan won the match by 127 runs. England need to win the third Test to have any chance of drawing the series and despite taking a first innings lead which Cook contributed 49 to, Pakistan batted well in the second innings and England were dismissed for 256 in their second innings, meaning they lost the series 2–0, despite Cook scoring 63.

For his performances in 2015, he was named as captain of the World Test XI by the ICC. He was also named in the Test XI by ESPNCricinfo and Cricbuzz.

=== 2015/16: South Africa ===
In the Test series against South Africa, Cook made a duck in the first innings of the first Test, but England recovered to post 303. England went on to win the game by 241 runs thanks to a strong bowling performance. In the second Test Cook again failed to make a major impression, scoring just 35 runs in the entire match in what proved to be a high scoring draw. Cook started to show some form in the third Test. He scored 43 in England's second innings total of 74–3, as England won the game by seven wickets after dismissing South Africa for just 83 in their second innings. In the final Test of the series, which England had already won, Cook made 76 in the first innings. However, England collapsed in the second innings and only made 101, with Cook being dismissed for five. Despite this, England won the series 2–1 with Cook captaining England to the historic victory.

=== 2016: Sri Lanka ===
In the first Test against Sri Lanka, Cook could only make 16 but England went on to win the match by an innings and 88 runs. In the second Test, he created history on 30 May 2016 in the second Test against Sri Lanka to become the youngest batsman to score 10000 Test runs beating Sachin Tendulkar's 11-year-old record. The 31-year-old broke the record on the fourth day of the second Test match against Sri Lanka at Chester Le Street. He became the 12th international cricketer to reach the landmark and the first Englishman. He scored 47 in England's second innings to help England to a convincing nine wicket victory. In the first innings of the third Test, he scored 85 to help England to 416. He came in down the order for England's second innings after being injured in the field and made an unbeaten 49. Rain on the final day meant the match finished in a draw, with England winning the series 2–0.

=== 2016: Pakistan ===
Cook broke India great Sunil Gavaskar’s record of 9,607 for the most runs as a Test opener while making 81 against Pakistan in the first Test at Lord's. However, Cook could only make eight in the second innings and England lost the opening Test by 75 runs. On 22 July 2016, Alastair Cook equalled Don Bradman's record of having hit 29 Test centuries when he scored 105 on the opening day of the 2nd Test against Pakistan at Old Trafford. He chose not to enforce the follow-on when England were far ahead in the second Test – but was vindicated by an England victory, with Cook scoring an unbeaten 76 in England's second innings. In the third Test he made scores of 45 and 66 and England won by 141 runs to go 2–1 up in the series. However, England lost the final match, with Cook scoring 35 in the first innings before making seven in the second innings as England lost by 10 wickets and the series ended in a 2–2 tie.

=== 2016: Bangladesh ===
In the first Test against Bangladesh, Cook scored 4 in the first innings and then made 12 in the second. Despite his low scores, England won by 21 runs. In the second Test Cook made 14 in the first innings, and although he made 59 in the second, England were bowled out for 164 to lose the match by 108 runs and draw the series 1–1.

=== 2016: India ===
In the first Test against India Cook made 21 in the first innings before making 130 in England's second innings total of 260/3, although England were unable to force a victory, with the match ending in a draw. In the second Test he made 2 in the first innings, before going on to score 54 in England's second innings total of 158, as England lost by 246 runs. In the third Test, Cook made 27 in the first innings before making 12 in the second innings, as England lost the match by eight wickets. In the fourth Test Cook made 46 in England's first innings total of 400, but was out for 18 in the second innings as England were bowled out for 195 and lost the match by an innings and 36 runs. In the final Test, Cook made 10 in the first innings as England scored 477, but India gained a first innings lead after scoring 759/7. Cook made 49 in England's second innings as they were dismissed for 207 to lose by an innings and 75 runs. A month and half after the end of the series, Cook stood down as Test captain, having captained the team in an English record of 59 Tests.

For his performances in 2016, he was named as captain of the World Test XI by the ICC.

=== 2017: South Africa ===
The first Test at Lord's was Cook's first under the new captain, Joe Root. Cook didn't score a century in the series but was reliable with three 50s. England won the 4 Test series 3–1 with the only loss at Trent Bridge. Cook's top scored in the second innings there with 42, with no other England batsmen offering much resistance.

=== 2017–18 Ashes ===
Cook's form slump that had continued through the 2017–18 Ashes, where he had not scored a half-century in 10 innings, finally came to an end with 104* from 166 balls by the end of day two of the Boxing Day Ashes Test in Melbourne. He went on to carry his bat with a double century and put England into a lead of over 100, finishing with 244 not out, the highest Test score by an opener who has carried the bat. In December 2018 this record was bettered by New Zealand's Tom Latham, in his score of 264* vs Sri Lanka. Cook passed 12,000 Test runs at the remarkably young age of 33 years and 10 days old in the following Test defeat in Sydney, losing the Ashes 4–0. This marked his final Ashes series, and final Test outside England.

=== 2018: Pakistan, India and international retirement ===
After a score of 70 of the first match of the home series against Pakistan, Cook had another slump in form, scoring a total of 155 more runs in 5 further matches Pakistan and India. On 3 September 2018, after the conclusion of the fourth Test, Cook announced that his twelve-year international career would end at the conclusion of the series against India. On the fourth day of the fifth Test (after resuming on an overnight score of 46*), Cook made a score of 147 and in doing so became the fifth batsman to score a century in his first and last Test match and the second batsman to score twin fifties in his first and last Test. When he reached 76 during the innings, he overtook Kumar Sangakkara to become the fifth-highest run-scorer and the highest-scoring left-hander in Test history.

== Outside cricket ==
Cook has written a column in The Daily Telegraph and Metro. He used his skill with the saxophone to contribute to Freefonix, a CBBC animated series with music-based adventures. Cook has donated his time to various charities including taking part in The Great City Race for Breakthrough Breast Cancer and modelled naked alongside fellow cricketers James Anderson and Stuart Broad to help raise awareness for testicular cancer on behalf of the Everyman Campaign. He is also an active patron of the David Randall Foundation, a charity that carries the name of his childhood friend and opening partner at Maldon CC & Essex age group teams. Much of the proceeds from his 2014 Benefit Year went to this charity.

In December 2011, Cook married Alice Hunt, whom he had known since childhood. The couple have two daughters and one son. He was allowed to miss two tour games in Bangladesh to be present at the birth of the second child in October 2016.

Cook helps maintain a farm near Leighton Buzzard, and has described farming and cricket as the two passions in his life, stating that "They are both my passions and not many people can say what they do for their job or their life is what they love doing all the time". Cook is a fan of hunting and deer stalking.

Cook published his autobiography (Sir Alastair Cook: My Autobiography) in September 2019 with Penguin Books.

== Achievements ==
=== Test cricket ===
==== Records ====
- Youngest Englishman to score 2,000, 3,000, 4,000, and 5,000 Test runs.
- Youngest player (from any country) to score 6,000, 7,000, 8,000, 9,000, 10,000, 11,000 and 12,000 runs in Test cricket.
- Second opener (after Indian opener Sunil Gavaskar) to reach over 10,000 Test runs, first opener to reach over 11,000 and 12,000 Test runs.

Timeline:

- March 2006: 16th Englishman to score a century on his debut, 5th to combine it with a half century.
- December 2006: Only Englishman to score 4 centuries before his 22nd birthday.
- May 2007: Only Englishman (second worldwide) to score 1,000 runs in maiden year.
- December 2007: Only Englishman to score 7 centuries before his 23rd birthday.
- February 2009: England's record opening stand against West Indies (229 with Andrew Strauss).
- November 2010: England's record partnership in Australia, world record partnership and innings at the Gabba (329 with Jonathan Trott, 235 not out).
- December 2010: England's record for runs scored and time spent at the crease between dismissals (383 runs in 1,053 minutes).
- January 2011: World record for time spent batting in a five Test series, second most series runs by an Englishman (2,171 minutes, 766 runs).
- December 2012: Most Test centuries for England (broke the record at 23 centuries).
- December 2012: First captain worldwide to score a century in first five Tests.
- December 2012: England's highest run-scorer in India (866 runs).
- May 2015: Most Test runs for England (broke the record at 8,901 runs).
- August 2015: First England cricketer to be involved in 50 Test wins.
- October 2015: Longest England Test innings (836 minutes), 3rd longest of all time.
- October 2015: Became the all-time highest non-Asian run-scorer in Asia.
- October 2016: England's most capped player in Tests, surpassing Alec Stewart's record of 134.
- November 2016: England's most capped Test captain, surpassing Mike Atherton's record of 54.
- November 2016: Most Test centuries by England skipper, surpassing Graham Gooch's record of 11.
- December 2017: sixth-highest run-scorer in Test cricket, surpassing Brian Lara's record of 11,953 runs and reaching 12,000 Test runs.
- June 2018: Most consecutive Test matches of all time, surpassing Allan Border's record of 153.
- September 2018: fifth-highest run-scorer in Test cricket and became the highest Test run-scorer among left-handers, surpassing Kumar Sangakkara's record of 12,400 runs. He also became only the fifth batsman to score centuries in both his first and last Test match.
- In 2024, he became the 33rd England player to be honored in the ICC Hall of Fame, joining the ranks of WG Grace, Shane Warne, Brian Lara, Ian Botham, and Viv Richards.

=== International recognition ===
- 2003
  - NBC Denis Compton Award
- 2004
  - NBC Denis Compton Award
- 2005
  - NBC Denis Compton Award
  - CWC Young Cricketer of the Year
  - PCA Young Cricketer of the Year
- 2006
  - NBC Denis Compton Award
  - PCA Young Cricketer of the Year
- 2011
  - Freedom of the City of London
  - Member of the Order of the British Empire (MBE)
  - ICC Test Player of The Year
  - ICC World Test XI opening batsman
- 2012
  - Wisden Cricketers of the Year
  - ICC World Test XI opening batsman
  - ICC World ODI XI opening batsman
- 2013
  - ICC World Test XI captain
- 2015
  - ICC World Test XI captain
- 2016
  - Commander of the Order of the British Empire (CBE)
  - ICC World Test XI captain
- 2019
  - Knight Bachelor
