= 2007 English cricket season =

County Championship
- Champions: Sussex
- Runners-up: Durham
- Most runs: Mark Ramprakash (2,026)
- Most wickets: Mushtaq Ahmed (90)

Friends Provident Trophy
- Champions: Durham Dynamos
- Runners-up: Hampshire Hawks
- Most runs: Phil Mustard (484)
- Most wickets: Ottis Gibson (22)

NatWest Pro40
- Champions: Worcestershire Royals
- Runners-up: Nottinghamshire Outlaws
- Most runs: Phil Mustard (409)
- Most wickets: Tim Murtagh (22)

Twenty20 Cup
- Champions: Kent Spitfires
- Runners-up: Gloucestershire Gladiators
- Most runs: Luke Wright (346)
- Most wickets: Chris Schofield (17)

PCA Player of the Year
- Ottis Gibson

Wisden Cricketers of the Year
- Ian Bell; Shivnarine Chanderpaul; Ottis Gibson; Zaheer Khan; Ryan Sidebottom

The 2007 English cricket season was the 108th in which the County Championship had been an official competition. It began on Saturday 14 April 2007 with the match between MCC and the 2006 county champions Sussex at Lord's. Sussex went on to win the County Championship.

The West Indies toured England to compete in the Wisden Trophy test series which England won 3-0 and India defeated England 1–0 in the Pataudi Trophy.

== Roll of honour ==
Test series

- England v West Indies: 4 Tests – England won 3–0.
- England v India: 3 Tests – India won 1–0.

ODI series

- England v West Indies: 3 ODI's – West Indies won 2–1.
- England v India: 7 ODI's – England won 4–3.

Twenty20 Internationals

- England v West Indies: 2-match series tied 1–1.

County Championship

- Champions: Sussex
- Division Two winners: Somerset

Friends Provident Trophy

- Winners: Durham – Runners-up: Hampshire

Pro40 (National League)

- Division One winners: Worcestershire
- Division Two winners: Durham

Twenty20 Cup

- Winners: Kent – Runners-up: Gloucestershire

Minor Counties Championship

- Winners: Cheshire – Runners-up: Northumberland

MCCA Knockout Trophy

- Winners: Suffolk – Runners-up: Cheshire

Second XI Championship

- Winners: Sussex

Second XI Trophy

- Winners: Middlesex 2nd XI – Runners-up: Somerset 2nd XI

Middlesex won by 1 run.

Wisden Cricketers of the Year

- Ian Bell, Shivnarine Chanderpaul, Ottis Gibson, Ryan Sidebottom, Zaheer Khan

== Domestic competition tables ==
=== County Championship ===
Division One

P	Team	Pld	W	L	Tie	D	Aban	Bat	Bowl	Deduct	Pts	Promoted / Relegated
1	Sussex	16	7	3	0	5	1	37	43	0	202	
2	Durham	16	7	5	0	4	0	38	47	1.5	197.5	
3	Lancashire	16	5	2	0	8	1	40	44	0	190	
4	Surrey	16	5	4	0	6	1	41	40	1	178	
5	Hampshire	16	5	3	0	8	0	32	43	0	177	
6	Yorkshire	16	4	4	0	8	0	49	38	0	175	
7	Kent	16	3	5	0	7	1	43	36	0	153	
8	Warwickshire	16	2	5	0	9	0	40	35	0	139	Relegated to Championship Division 2
9	Worcestershire	16	1	8	0	5	2	18	35	0	95	Relegated to Championship Division 2

Last updated: 22 September 2007
Source: https://cricketarchive.com/Archive/Events/Tables/LV_County_Championship_2007.html
Rules for classification: 1^{st} points; 2^{nd} matches won; 3^{rd} fewest defeats
P = Position; Pld = Matches played; W = Matches won; L = Matches lost; Tie = Matches tied; D = Matches drawn; Aban = Matches abandoned; Deduct = Points deducted; Pts = Points
Division Two

P	Team	Pld	W	L	Tie	D	Aban	Bat	Bowl	Deduct	Pts	Promoted / Relegated
1	Somerset	16	10	1	0	5	0	65	41	0	266	Promoted to Championship Division 1
2	Nottinghamshire	16	6	3	0	7	0	60	43	0.5	214.5	Promoted to Championship Division 1
3	Middlesex	16	6	2	0	8	0	35	43	1.5	192.5	
4	Essex	16	6	4	0	6	0	40	36	2	182	
5	Northamptonshire	16	5	5	0	6	0	44	38	0	176	
6	Derbyshire	16	3	5	0	8	0	30	44	1	147	
7	Gloucestershire	16	3	5	0	8	0	32	37	3.5	139.5	
8	Leicestershire	16	2	8	0	5	1	32	35	4	115	
9	Glamorgan	16	1	9	0	5	1	26	37	8.5	92.5	

Last updated: 22 September 2007
Source: https://cricketarchive.com/Archive/Events/Tables/LV_County_Championship_2007.html
Rules for classification: 1^{st} points; 2^{nd} matches won; 3^{rd} fewest defeats
P = Position; Pld = Matches played; W = Matches won; L = Matches lost; Tie = Matches tied; D = Matches drawn; Aban = Matches abandoned; Deduct = Points deducted; Pts = Points

=== Friends Provident Trophy ===
Friends Provident Trophy Tables
North Conference

P	Team	Pld	W	L	Tie	NR	Aban	Pts	Net Run Rate
1	Durham	9	7	2	0	0	0	14	0.87
2	Warwickshire	9	6	1	0	0	2	14	0.71
3	Nottinghamshire	9	6	2	0	0	1	13	0.80
4	Worcestershire	9	4	3	0	2	0	10	0.21
5	Yorkshire	9	4	3	0	1	1	10	0.09
6	Leicestershire	9	4	3	0	0	2	10	-0.31
7	Lancashire	9	3	5	0	0	1	7	-0.63
8	Derbyshire	9	2	6	0	0	1	5	-0.25
9	Northamptonshire	9	1	6	0	0	2	4	-0.73
10	Scotland	9	1	7	0	1	0	3	-1.05

Source: https://cricketarchive.com/Archive/Events/Tables/Friends_Provident_Trophy_2007.html
Rules for classification: 1^{st} points; 2^{nd} matches won; 3^{rd} net run rate
P = Position; Pld = Matches played; W = Matches won; L = Matches lost; Tie = Matches tied; NR = No result in matches started; Aban = Matches abandoned; Pts = Points; NRR = Net Run Rate

South Conference

P	Team	Pld	W	L	Tie	NR	Aban	Pts	Net Run Rate
1	Hampshire	9	6	1	1	0	1	14	0.32
2	Essex	9	6	2	0	0	1	13	1.05
3	Gloucestershire	9	6	2	0	0	1	13	0.13
4	Kent	9	5	3	0	0	1	11	0.89
5	Surrey	9	4	3	0	0	2	10	0.78
6	Somerset	9	4	3	1	0	1	10	0.20
7	Middlesex	9	3	5	0	0	1	7	-0.38
8	Sussex	9	2	5	0	1	1	6	-0.69
9	Glamorgan	9	0	6	0	1	2	3	-1.42
10	Ireland	9	0	6	0	0	3	3	-1.79

Source: https://cricketarchive.com/Archive/Events/Tables/Friends_Provident_Trophy_2007.html
Rules for classification: 1^{st} points; 2^{nd} matches won; 3^{rd} net run rate
P = Position; Pld = Matches played; W = Matches won; L = Matches lost; Tie = Matches tied; NR = No result in matches started; Aban = Matches abandoned; Pts = Points; NRR = Net Run Rate

=== Twenty20 Cup ===
Twenty20 Cup – Group Tables
North Division

P	Team	Pld	W	L	Tie	NR	Aban	Pts	Net Run Rate
1	Nottinghamshire	8	4	1	0	0	3	11	0.88
2	Lancashire	8	3	1	0	0	4	10	0.86
3	Yorkshire	8	4	3	0	0	1	9	-0.05
4	Leicestershire	8	2	1	0	2	3	9	-0.14
5	Durham	8	1	4	0	1	2	5	-0.58
6	Derbyshire	8	0	4	0	1	3	4	-1.10

Source: https://cricketarchive.com/Archive/Events/Tables/Twenty20_Cup_2007.html
Rules for classification: 1^{st} points; 2^{nd} matches won; 3^{rd} net run rate
P = Position; Pld = Matches played; W = Matches won; L = Matches lost; Tie = Matches tied; NR = No result in matches started; Aban = Matches abandoned; Pts = Points; NRR = Net Run Rate

Mid/West/Wales Division

P	Team	Pld	W	L	Tie	NR	Aban	Pts	Net Run Rate
1	Warwickshire	8	5	2	0	0	1	11	0.23
2	Gloucestershire	8	4	2	0	0	2	10	0.99
3	Worcestershire	8	3	2	0	0	3	9	-0.59
4	Northamptonshire	8	2	3	0	0	3	7	0.06
5	Somerset	8	3	5	0	0	0	6	-0.21
6	Glamorgan	8	1	4	0	0	3	5	-0.66

Source: https://cricketarchive.com/Archive/Events/Tables/Twenty20_Cup_2007.html
Rules for classification: 1^{st} points; 2^{nd} matches won; 3^{rd} net run rate
P = Position; Pld = Matches played; W = Matches won; L = Matches lost; Tie = Matches tied; NR = No result in matches started; Aban = Matches abandoned; Pts = Points; NRR = Net Run Rate

South Division

P	Team	Pld	W	L	Tie	NR	Aban	Pts	Net Run Rate
1	Sussex	8	5	2	0	0	1	11	0.18
2	Kent	8	4	2	1	1	0	10	0.32
3	Surrey	8	4	4	0	0	0	8	0.81
4	Essex	8	3	4	0	1	0	7	-0.37
5	Middlesex	8	2	3	0	1	2	7	-0.20
6	Hampshire	8	1	4	1	1	1	5	-1.12

Source: https://cricketarchive.com/Archive/Events/Tables/Twenty20_Cup_2007.html
Rules for classification: 1^{st} points; 2^{nd} matches won; 3^{rd} net run rate
P = Position; Pld = Matches played; W = Matches won; L = Matches lost; Tie = Matches tied; NR = No result in matches started; Aban = Matches abandoned; Pts = Points; NRR = Net Run Rate

Twenty20 Cup – Finals Day
Semi-finals

4 August 2007
scorecard

Lancashire; 148/6	v	Gloucestershire; 152/2
Steven Croft 33; Mark Hardinges 2/16 (4)		Craig Spearman 86; Muttiah Muralitharan 1/21 (4)

Gloucestershire won by 8 wickets
Edgbaston, Birmingham
Umpires: Jeremy Lloyds and Peter Willey
Player of the match: Craig Spearman

4 August 2007
scorecard

Sussex; 140	v	Kent; 141/5
Murray Goodwin (38); Lasith Malinga 3/30 (3.4)		Rob Key (68*); Michael Yardy 1/9 (2)

Kent won by 5 wickets
Edgbaston, Birmingham
Umpires: Nigel Llong and Neil Mallender
Player of the match: Rob Key

Final

4 August 2007
scorecard

Gloucestershire; 146/8	v	Kent; 147/6
Hamish Marshall (65); Ryan McLaren 3/22 (4) inc. hat-trick		Matt Walker (45); Mark Hardinges 2/24 (4)

Kent won by 4 wickets
Edgbaston, Birmingham
Umpires: Neil Mallender and Peter Willey
Player of the match: Ryan McLaren

== Annual reviews ==
- Playfair Cricket Annual 2008
- Wisden Cricketers' Almanack 2008
