= Owais Shah =

English cricketer (born 1978)

Personal information
- Full name: Owais Alam Shah
- Born: 22 October 1978 (age 48); Karachi, Sindh, Pakistan
- Nickname: Ace
- Height: 6 ft 1 in (1.85 m)
- Batting: Right-handed
- Bowling: Right-arm off break
- Role: Batsman

International information
- National side: England (2001–2009)
- Test debut (cap 632): 18 March 2006 v India
- Last Test: 6 March 2009 v West Indies
- ODI debut (cap 163): 10 June 2001 v Australia
- Last ODI: 2 October 2009 v Australia
- ODI shirt no.: 3 (prev. 69)
- T20I debut (cap 27): 28 June 2007 v West Indies
- Last T20I: 30 August 2009 v Australia
- T20I shirt no.: 3

Domestic team information
- Years: Team
- 1995–2010: Middlesex
- 2009: Delhi Daredevils
- 2009/10: Wellington
- 2010: Kolkata Knight Riders
- 2010/11–2012/13: Cape Cobras
- 2011: Kochi Tuskers Kerala
- 2011–2013: Essex
- 2011/12–2013/14: Hobart Hurricanes
- 2012–2013: Rajasthan Royals
- 2013: Dhaka Gladiators
- 2014–2015: Hampshire
- 2014: Jamaica Tallawahs
- 2015: Sylhet Super Stars

Career statistics
Competition	Test	ODI	T20I	FC
Matches	6	71	17	252
Runs scored	269	1,834	347	16,357
Batting average	26.90	30.56	24.78	41.94
100s/50s	0/2	1/12	–/1	45/79
Top score	88	107*	55*	203
Balls bowled	30	193	–	2,266
Wickets	0	7	–	26
Bowling average	–	26.28	–	57.88
5 wickets in innings	0	0	–	0
10 wickets in match	0	0	–	0
Best bowling	0/12	3/15	–	3/33
Catches/stumpings	2/–	21/–	5/–	200/–
- Source: ESPNcricinfo, 26 April 2016

Owais Alam Shah (born 22 October 1978) is a former England cricketer. A middle-order batsman, he played for Middlesex from 1995 to 2010 and Essex from 2011 to 2013 before announcing his retirement from first-class cricket. He played Twenty20 cricket for Hampshire in 2014 and 2015. He also represented England in all forms of the game.

Between 2001 and 2009, he played 71 ODIs and 17 Twenty20 Internationals. He also played 6 Tests, starting with a strong 88 on debut against India in 2006, however opportunities were limited and he did not make his third appearance until 2009 against the West Indies in 2008–09. With Michael Vaughan retired and Ian Bell dropped, Shah had the opportunity to claim the number three position for himself, however a weak series saw him dropped in favour of Ravi Bopara.

He also represented the Indian Premier League team Kolkata Knight Riders during the 2009 and 2010 seasons before being bought by Kochi Tuskers Kerala for the following two seasons, and had a short stint at the Wellington Firebirds in New Zealand. After Kochi Tuskers were excluded from the 2012 season, he played for Rajasthan Royals in IPL 5.

== Early career ==
Shah was born in Karachi, Sindh, Pakistan on 22 October 1978; a cricketing prodigy as an adolescent, Owais Shah began his career playing cricket for Wycombe House Cricket Club, breaking a number of club records. Owais scored a league 154 for the senior first XI when aged only 12. He won numerous awards for the club including the Ken Barrington National Cup. His maturity at a young age allowed him to work his way through both the England Youth and Middlesex Cricket County System. He made his first-class debut at age 17 in 1996 and won the NBC Denis Compton Award in 1997. In early 1998 he captained England to victory in the Under 19's World Cup in South Africa, and the following season he was captain of the England Under-19 cricket team for their "Test" match series at home against Pakistan. His selection for the England 'A' team that toured Australia in late 1998 at the age of 17 suggested he was on the verge of a call-up to England's Test side. However, two poor seasons followed, and despite being capped in 2000, by the end of that season—in which he made under 500 first-class runs—he could no longer command a place in the Middlesex first team. However, he made a return to form in 2001, averaging 41.60 and making his ODI debut against Australia at Bristol. Later that summer, he made 62 against Pakistan, and in 2001 Shah was named by the Cricket Writers' Club as their Young Cricketer of the Year. Owais attended Isleworth and Syon School for Boys and Lampton School (Hounslow) for A Levels and is a university graduate.

== Return to international cricket ==
Despite a fairly solid start to his international career, Shah could not produce the required consistency of form, making just one more fifty in ten innings from 2001/02 to 2002/03. He also suffered from a perception that his fielding was below par, something close to unforgivable in the modern one-day game, and he was dropped from the England side without having had a chance at Test cricket. In 2004, a year of success with the bat (1,336 runs at 53.44) was tempered by the loss of his Middlesex captaincy in mid-season after some poor results.

2005 brought much-improved returns, as he was top-scorer of the First Division of the County Championship with two weeks left to play, having made 1578 runs at an average of 65.75. At the end of the county season in September, Shah was being talked of as a possibility for England's winter tours of Pakistan and India.

He was selected for the England 'B' team tour of the West Indies that winter, but was called up to the squad for the first-team tour of India after England suffered several injuries. He made his Test debut in the third Test at Mumbai on 18 March 2006, making 88 in his first Test innings.

He returned to the England Test squad, after 15 months out, for the first Test match against the West Indies at his home ground of Lord's; however, he scored 6 and 4 in the two innings, in an otherwise productive England batting line-up. He was dropped from the squad for the second Test following captain Michael Vaughan's return to fitness.

Shah was, however, brought back for the ODI series, including two Twenty20 Internationals. While making little contribution with the bat in the first match, in which England were defeated, Shah hit a match winning 55 off 35 deliveries in the second, with England drawing the Twenty20 series 1–1. He was later made man of the match. He has changed his game somewhat in recent times, and is not the classical batsman that he was in his early years; however, he still possesses a wide range of shots, with the pull shot and the fierce slap through extra cover being the most prominent.

His maiden ODI century came against India at The Oval on 5 September 2007, when he made 107* off 95 balls. Later in the same match, he bowled in an ODI for the first time, and with his 17th delivery, took his first ODI wicket, the victim being the Indian captain Rahul Dravid. Shah toured Sri Lanka with England in late 2007, and then played in the ODI series against New Zealand in early 2008. While he had a disappointing ODI series, he top-scored with 96 in the first warm-up match to enhance his claims to the Test squad.

In July 2008 he helped Middlesex win the Twenty20 Cup with a match winning innings in the final with 75 runs scored off just 35 balls, the highlight of which was three successive sixes over mid-wicket off Kent off-spinner James Tredwell.

After the retirement of captain Michael Vaughan during summer 2008, Shah had a chance to claim a place on the tour to the West Indies. Although Ian Bell played the first Test at 3, he was dropped and replaced by Shah for the remainder of the Test series. Shah only managed one half-century, although he did reach 13,000 first-class runs during the third Test, and was not chosen for the summer Tests against West Indian cricket team in England in 2009 and Australia.

He had a poor ODI series against Australia in 2009, failing to record a score of higher than 44 in all seven matches. Going into the 2009 ICC Champions Trophy, he was under severe pressure for his place, but scored another 44 in the opening match against Sri-Lanka, before a match-winning 98 in the second group game against hosts South Africa. This came too late though, as Shah was not included in any of England's squads for the tour to South Africa. Despite still having a central contract and later being included in the England Performance Squad for the 2010 home series, he was not included in any of the final squads and did not represent England during 2010.

Middlesex announced on 31 August 2010 that they would not be renewing Shah's contract at the end of the 2010 season.

== Indian Premier League ==
With England players free to participate in the second season of the Indian Premier League, Owais Shah was signed by the Delhi Daredevils for $275,000 during their second player auction. He was then traded to Kolkata Knight Riders in exchange of Moises Henriques. He was bought by the new team Kochi Tuskers Kerala for $200,000 and played for them in the fourth season of the IPL. In IPL 5 he played for Rajasthan Royals

== Wellington Firebirds ==
On 31 August 2009 it was announced that the Wellington Firebirds had signed Shah for their domestic Twenty20 competition in December 2009. He was recommended by his former Middlesex colleague Stephen Fleming.

== Cape Cobras ==
Shah played for the Cape Cobras in South Africa winning the first-class, one day and Pro20 competitions during his stay.

== Coaching career ==
Shah served as interim head coach of United Arab Emirates national team from November 2016 to January 2017, when he was succeeded by Dougie Brown. The sole major tournament for the UAE during that time was the 2017 Desert T20 Challenge. In November 2020, he was selected by the Dambulla Viiking as the head coach for the inaugural edition of the Lanka Premier League.
