= Shaaiq Choudhry =

English cricketer

Personal information
- Full name: Shaaiq Hussain Choudhry
- Born: 3 November 1985 (age 41); Rotherham, South Yorkshire, England
- Batting: Right-handed
- Bowling: Slow left-arm orthodox

Domestic team information
- Years: Team
- 2010–2014: Worcestershire (squad no. 28)
- FC debut: 1 June 2007 MCC v West Indians
- LA debut: 19 July 2010 Worcestershire v Sussex

Career statistics
Competition	FC	LA	T20
Matches	11	22	11
Runs scored	306	163	61
Batting average	25.50	18.11	30.50
100s/50s	0/3	0/0	0/0
Top score	75	39	26*
Balls bowled	1,000	618	156
Wickets	17	14	6
Bowling average	27.82	46.14	30.33
5 wickets in innings	0	0	0
10 wickets in match	0	0	0
Best bowling	4/38	4/54	2/24
Catches/stumpings	6/–	7/–	0/–
- Source: Cricinfo, 25 May 2013

Shaaiq Choudhry (born 1985) is an English cricketer who has played for Worcestershire County Cricket Club. A right-handed batsman and slow left-arm orthodox bowler, he made his first-class debut in 2007 playing for Marylebone Cricket Club in a three-day match as part of the West Indies tour of England in 2007.Shaaiq in his spare time enjoys playing local Yorkshire league cricket because it makes him feel like he is still relevant, recently scoring 109* for £500 against the world's greatest cricket club CACC, which turned out to only be in vain as CACC ended up boxing the opposition out with a ball to spare :)

== Career ==
=== Debut ===
Born 3 November 1985 in Rotherham, South Yorkshire, Choudhry made his debut for Marylebone Cricket Club as a 21-year-old against the West Indies. Batting at eight, Choudhry top scored for the MCC with a score of 54 not out in 143 balls helping MCC to 260. Choudhry also bowled 12 overs without success in a drawn match.

=== County cricket ===
From 2007 until 2010, Choudhry was contracted at Warwickshire, despite playing in a host of second XI matches he left the club in 2010 without making a single senior appearance. In May 2010, Choudhry was given an eight-week trial with Worcestershire. During his trial, Choudhry played in a drawn County Championship game against Sussex at Hove where he made a then career best 63 in the first innings, helping Worcestershire towards a first innings score of 464. He then claimed the wicket of Ed Joyce in the Sussex innings. Choudhry signed a one-year contract with Worcestershire following a successful trial with the club.

The day after the contract was agreed, Choudhry made his T20 debut in a loss against Durham. Choudhry made his List A debut for Worcestershire in July against Sussex where he made 39 and was wicketless in a heavy 159 run loss. In late August 2010, Choudhry took one wicket and scored the winning run with 21 not out in a victory against Unicorns. On 1 September 2010, Choudhry claimed his best one day bowling figures of 4–54 against Surrey. Choudhry claimed the wicket of England international Kevin Pietersen with a caught and bowled in his one-day debut for Surrey after he joined on a months loan from Hampshire as Worcestershire won by 90 runs. In April 2011, Choudhry also claimed two wickets in a loss against Middlesex. Choudhry took 2–24 in a one-day match against Northamptonshire at New Road in a seven wicket victory for Worcestershire.
