= Simon Butler (cricketer) =

English cricketer

Personal information
- Full name: Simon Max Butler
- Born: 2 October 1984 (age 42); High Wycombe, Buckinghamshire, England
- Batting: Right-handed
- Bowling: Right-arm medium

Domestic team information
- Years: Team
- 2007: Marylebone Cricket Club

Career statistics
Competition	First-class
Matches	2
Runs scored	36
Batting average	18.00
100s/50s	–/–
Top score	21*
Balls bowled	236
Wickets	5
Bowling average	33.60
5 wickets in innings	–
10 wickets in match	–
Best bowling	3/121
Catches/stumpings	–/–
- Source: Cricinfo, 27 October 2018

Simon Max Butler (born 2 October 1984) is a former English first-class cricketer.

Born at High Wycombe, Butler attended Cardiff University, where he played minor matches for Cardiff UCCE. In one such match against Leeds/Bradford UCCE in 2007, Butler scored 167, which was the highest score that year by a university batsman. In that same year, Butler made two appearances in first-class cricket for the Marylebone Cricket Club against the touring West Indians at Durham, and Sri Lanka A at Arundel. He scored a total of 36 runs in these matches, as well as taking 5 wickets. He played Second XI cricket for Middlesex, Leicestershire, and Nottinghamshire, but was unable to force his way into their starting elevens. He also played Hawke Cup cricket in New Zealand for North Otago in late 2008 and early 2009.
