= Wycombe House Sports and Social Club =

Private members club in Isleworth, London, England

- Formation: 1888
- Type: Private Members Club
- Purpose: Cricket; Darts; Table tennis; Tennis
- Location: Jersey Road, Isleworth - London, England
- Coordinates: 51.4883°N 0.340278°W
- Chairman: Kam Patel (as of 2021)
- Website: https://wycombehouse.club

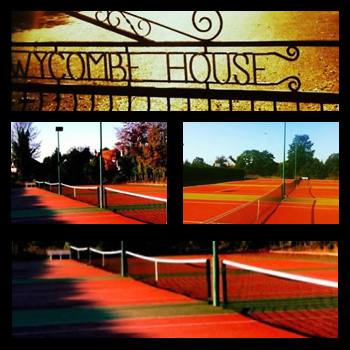

Wycombe House Sports and Social Club is a private members club in Isleworth, West London. It was founded in 1888 and is one of the oldest remaining private members multi-sport and social clubs in the world.

== History ==
The club was formed by members of the Hammersmith Branch of the YMCA at the end of 1888. The name 'Wycombe House' is derived from the name of the YMCA's Hammersmith Road headquarters – a large house with extensive grounds which appears to have dated back to at least the mid eighteenth century and may have originally been the farmhouse of Stonehills farm, long ago demolished.

The club's first ground was a pitch on Wormwood Scrubs rented from London County Council and it later played on other rented grounds in West London before arriving at its present ground in 1939.

The ground was requisitioned during World War II as a farm for livestock. Sport restarted in 1948. The club purchased the freehold in 1978 and inaugurated a new clubhouse in 1981.

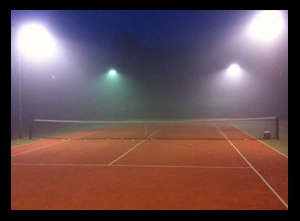
Wycombe House Tennis Courts at Night

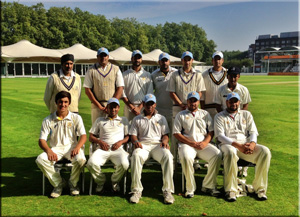
Wycombe House victory at Lords (Marylebone Cricket Club) in a prestigious match against The Cross Arrows.

== The Cricket Section ==
Wycombe House Cricket Club is a Clubmark cricket club having the national accreditation awarded by Sport England. These standards include safeguarding and protecting children and young people and club management.

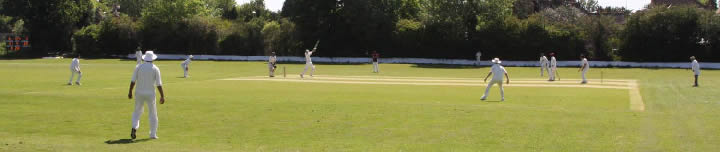

The Wycombe House Cricket Clubs under 13's (Colts) were National Champions in 1987, 1992 and 1999. in 1992 the Colts had a clean sweep winning the Area and County Leagues at all age groups, becoming the first winners of the County Victor Ludorum Cup, which they again won in 1999 and 2000.

Some members have gone on to play for England, Middlesex, Worcestershire, Somerset, Essex, Kent, Middlesex Colts, Middlesex Schools, England Schools and MMC, Middlesex and England Young Cricketers.

== The Social Section ==
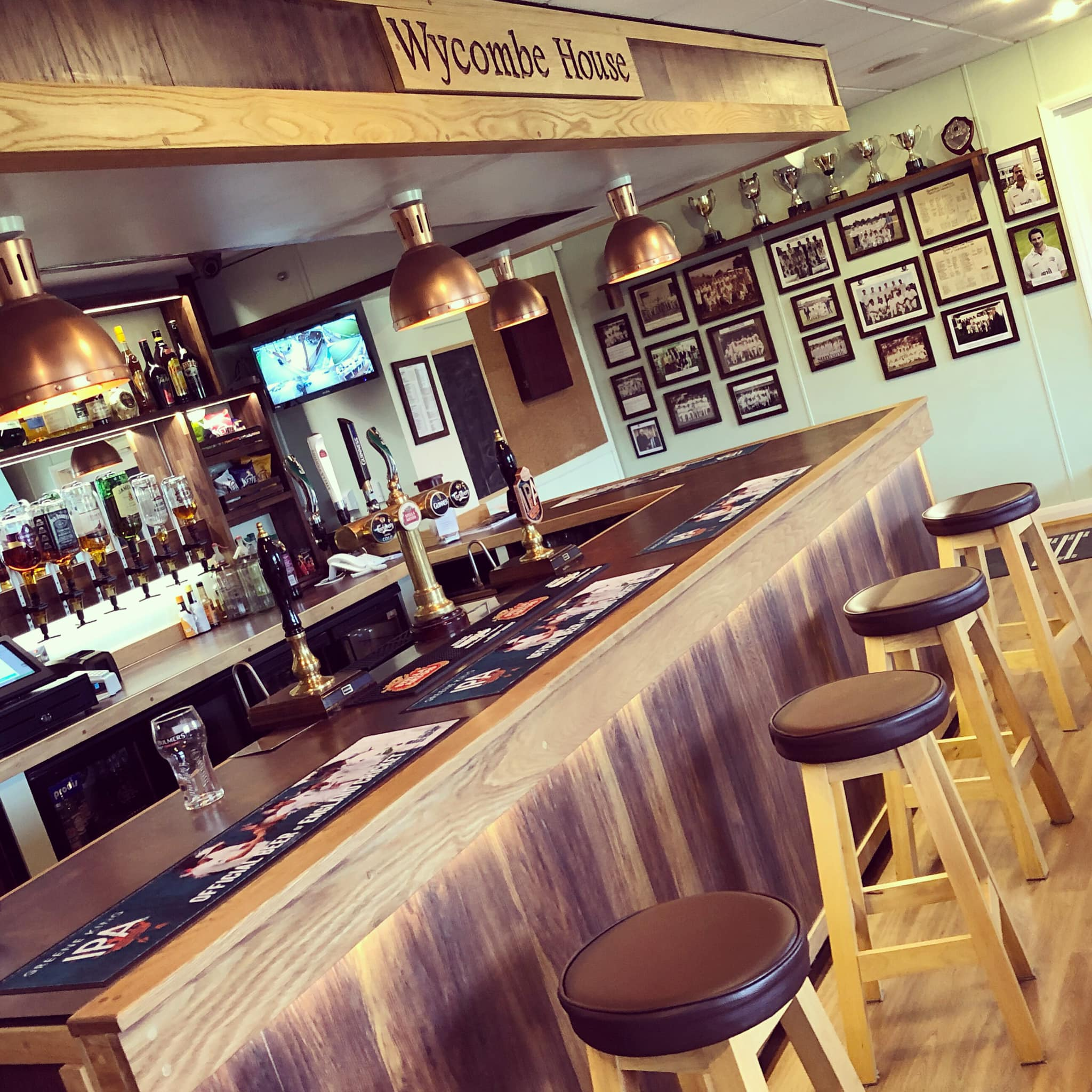
Wycombe House Bar

Wycombe House Social Club has a large bar area where events throughout the year include Quiz Nights, BBQ's, Dinners and Karaoke Nights

== The Table Tennis Section ==
This section were the South West Middlesex League Champions in 1972–73, 1973–74, 1974–75, 1975–76, 1995–96, 1996–97, 1999–2000, 2000–2001 as well as Cup Winners: 1972–73, 1973–74, 1990–91, 1993–94, 2002–03, 2004–05

== The Tennis Section ==
Wycombe House Lawn Tennis Club is the tennis section formed in 1930 and which played on grass courts until 1984, when hard courts were laid. In 2011 the courts became Matchplay II carpet surfaces.

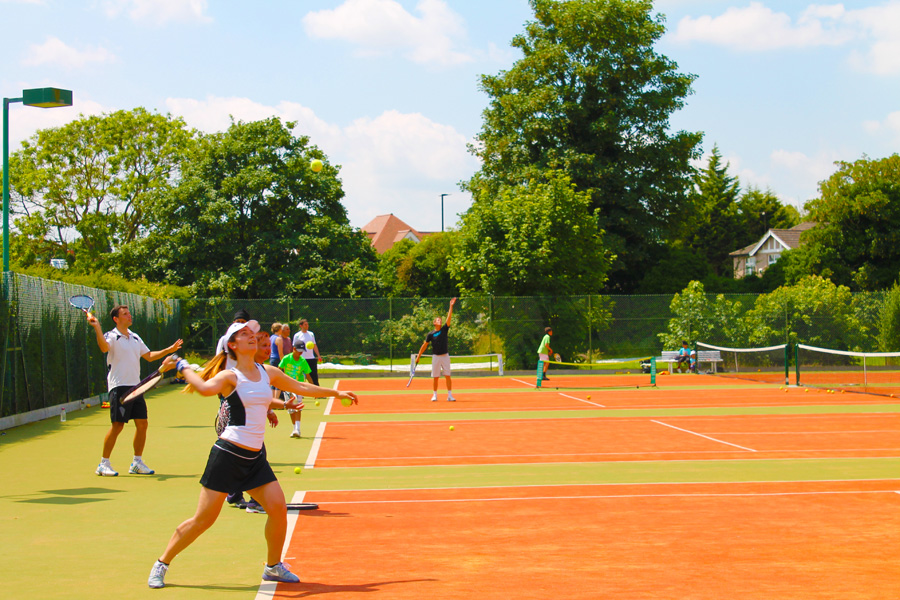

Floodlighting in 1992 considerably extended hours and membership. The tennis club competes competitively in the Middlesex county league with three men's teams, one ladies team, one mixed team and two veterans teams.

== Membership ==
A prospective member must be proposed by one member and elected by the majority of the management committee. The name and address of person proposed for election shall, for not less than two days before the election, be displayed on the Club notice board. The decision of the committee as to the election is final.

== Affiliations ==
- Club Cricket Conference (CCC)
- England & Wales Cricket Board (ECB)
- Middlesex Cricket Board (MCB)
- Middlesex Colts Association (MCA)
- Lawn Tennis Association (LTA)
- Middlesex County Lawn Tennis Association (MCLTA)
