= Ryan Sidebottom =

English cricketer (born 1978)

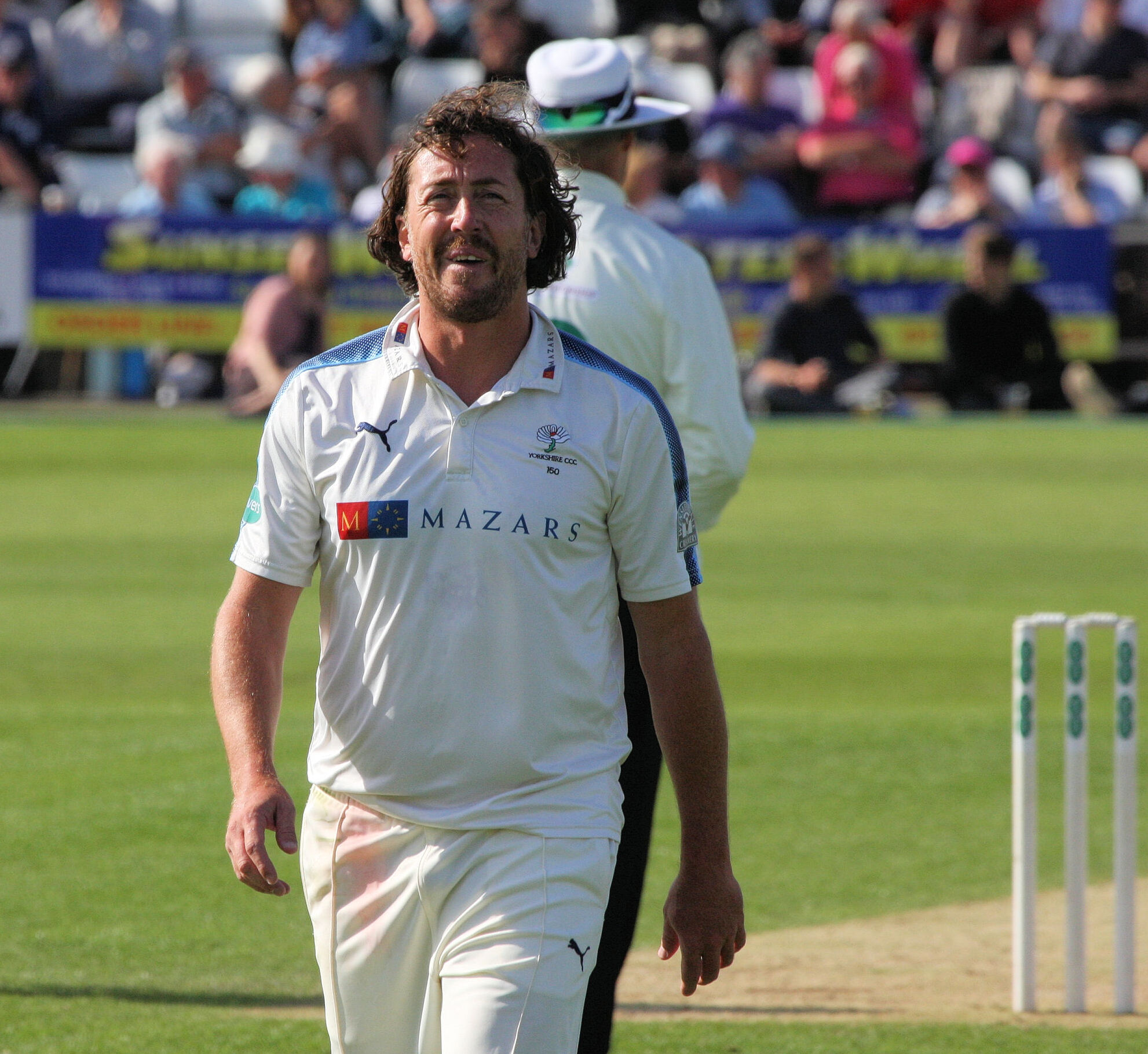
- Sidebottom in 2017

Personal information
- Full name: Ryan Jay Sidebottom
- Born: 15 January 1978 (age 48); Huddersfield, West Yorkshire
- Height: 1.96 m (6 ft 5 in)
- Batting: Left-handed
- Bowling: Left-arm fast-medium
- Role: Bowler
- Relatives: Arnie Sidebottom (father)

International information
- National side: England (2001–2010)
- Test debut (cap 604): 17 May 2001 v Pakistan
- Last Test: 14 January 2010 v South Africa
- ODI debut (cap 168): 7 October 2001 v Zimbabwe
- Last ODI: 28 February 2010 v Bangladesh
- ODI shirt no.: 18

Domestic team information
- Years: Team
- 1997–2003: Yorkshire
- 2003–2010: Nottinghamshire
- 2011–2017: Yorkshire (squad no. 11)

Career statistics
Competition	Test	ODI	FC	LA
Matches	22	25	230	186
Runs scored	313	133	2,684	552
Batting average	15.65	13.30	13.90	11.04
100s/50s	0/0	0/0	0/3	0/0
Top score	31	24	61	32
Balls bowled	4,812	1,277	39,204	8,226
Wickets	79	29	762	198
Bowling average	28.24	35.82	23.80	30.97
5 wickets in innings	5	0	31	2
10 wickets in match	1	0	4	0
Best bowling	7/47	3/19	7/37	6/40
Catches/stumpings	5/–	6/–	64/–	39/–
- Source: ESPNcricinfo, 28 September 2017

Ryan Jay Sidebottom (born 15 January 1978) is a former England international cricketer who played domestic cricket for Yorkshire and Nottinghamshire and retired in 2017, after taking more than 1,000 career wickets. He is the only player in the last 15 years (as of 2017) to win 5 county championships and also won the 2010 ICC World Twenty20 with England.

He was primarily a left-arm fast-medium bowler. Sidebottom played his first Test match in 2001 against Pakistan, but failed to take a wicket and was dropped for six years. In 2007, he was brought back into the side following an injury to Matthew Hoggard and took four wickets in his first innings. He went on to become a prolific bowler for England over the next two years, though injuries saw him lose his place in the Test side in 2009. He retired from international duty on 20 September 2010, after playing 22 Tests for England and winning the 2010 ICC World Twenty20.

He took the 37th Test cricket hat-trick in his 11th match for England against New Zealand, becoming the 11th English player to do so, on 8 March 2008, and on 23 March, he took his third five-wicket haul in the same series, breaking the previous record for an Englishman in New Zealand.

He is a former pupil of King James's Grammar School, Almondbury, Huddersfield. He has two children, a daughter, Indiana Nell, and a son, Darley Jack with his first wife Kate. He now lives with his second wife Madeleine and her son Louis. His father, Arnie Sidebottom, was also a cricketer, and played one Test match for England in 1985 against Australia, as well as playing professional football.

== Career ==
Sidebottom started playing as a young boy for Holmfirth Cricket Club and Kirkburton Cricket Club in his native West Yorkshire, his father being the club professional at the former . He made his debut for his native Yorkshire in 1997. The winner of the NBC Denis Compton Award two years running, (in 1999 and 2000), he finished as the leading domestic English-bowler at the end of 2000, conceding only 12.5 runs for each of his 24 wickets, and capping this with a nomination for Cricketer of the Year by the Cricket Writers' Club. Injury problems took away much of his 2000 season, but, during the winter, Sidebottom toured the West Indies with England A, taking 16 wickets at a bowling average of 16.81. He made his international debut the following summer against Pakistan in place of Matthew Hoggard. He played in two ODIs in October 2001 against Zimbabwe.

Sidebottom left Yorkshire to join Nottinghamshire at the end of the 2003 season, having taken 163 wickets for Yorkshire at an average of 25.12. At Nottinghamshire, he took 50 wickets in both the 2005 and 2006 seasons, helping them to the County Championship title in 2005. He has won five County Championships in total; he won the title with Yorkshire in 2001, 2014 and 2015 after returning to the county of his birth, and with Nottinghamshire in 2005 and 2010.

He sports a flamboyant hairstyle which has led to the dressing room nickname of "Sexual Chocolate". Sidebottom's long hair indirectly led to a second nickname, "Stringfellow", after a hapless Henry Blofeld repeatedly confused him with long-haired nightclub impresario Peter Stringfellow during the first Test match against New Zealand in 2008.

On 22 February 2017, Sidebottom announced that he would be retiring from first-class cricket in all formats, commencing at the end of the 2017 County Championship. He now runs a Cricket Academy and Foundation.

Sidebottom was appointed bowling consultant for Surrey, on 14 March 2018.

In 2019, Sidebottom appeared on the eleventh series of Dancing on Ice alongside professional skater Brandee Malto. Following a skate-off against Melody Thornton and Jane Danson, Sidebottom and Danson were eliminated in Week 7.

He considers his career behind him, with no direct participation in cricket aside from competitive veterans' leagues.

== International Test career ==
=== Debut—Pakistan 2001 ===
Sidebottom made his international Test debut at Lord's in May 2001, as England took on Pakistan. Batting first, England made 391 and in reply, Pakistan made 203 and 179, with the away side sinking to an innings and 9 run defeat. Sidebottom contributed four with the bat and finished with figures of 0–38 and 0–26.

=== West Indies 2007 ===
Following this match, Sidebottom had to wait another six years before being recalled to play in the England side to face the West Indies in the second Test in May 2007, following the injury to Matthew Hoggard in the opening match. His first Test victim was Chris Gayle, trapped leg before wicket, and Daren Ganga, Dwayne Bravo and Corey Collymore soon followed, as he finished with figures of 4–42. The West Indies followed on, and Sidebottom again impressed, taking the wickets of four of the top order batsmen, ending with 4–44. The hosts eventually won by a record innings and 283 runs.

In the third Test, Sidebottom contributed a useful 23 over the two innings and finished with match figures of 3–101 as England won by 60 runs. In the final match of the series, he took his first international five wicket haul during the West Indies' first innings, finishing with 5–88, hit an unbeaten 26 in England's reply, and then bowled fifteen overs for 40 runs, with no reward, as the hosts won by 7 wickets and wrapped up a 3–0 series victory.

=== India 2007 ===
Following these excellent performances, Sidebottom was included in the England squad to take on India in the second 2007 summer series. In the first Test, he again impressed, taking 4–65 as India struggled to 201. He then followed that in the second innings with 2–42 as the match fizzled out into a draw, with England just one wicket from victory. As England slumped to a seven wicket defeat in the second Test, Sidebottom finished with figures of 1–75 (at an economy of 2.08) and 0–23. However, he was deemed extremely unlucky only to finish with one wicket as he found copious amounts of swing and troubled a number of batsmen. Ashley Giles remarked, "One wicket in the first innings did not do his excellent bowling justice." He also made 18* and 25* with the bat, as he began to establish himself as a competent and reliable number 9.

In the final Test of the summer, and the third of the series against India, Sidebottom bowled a controlled 32 overs for 93 runs, taking the wicket of Dinesh Karthik as the visitors amassed 664. However, he injured himself and did not bowl another ball in the match. Whilst batting, he fell for 2 in the first innings and was 3* at the end of the second, as the hosts held out for a draw. This could not stop India recording a 1 – 0 series win.

=== Sri Lanka 2007/08 ===
Sidebottom had an up down series in the tour of Sri Lanka. In the One Day International series, he took 12 wickets in five matches but struggled in the Test matches taking five wickets in three tests at a disappointing average of 63.60. Sri Lanka won the Test series 1–0 and England won the One Day Series 3–2.

=== New Zealand 2007/2008 ===
Sidebottom then accompanied the England team on their tour of New Zealand. Over the five ODI matches he took six wickets at an average of 34.16, behind only Stuart Broad's eight wickets at 25.75. He did not make much impact with the bat, however, scoring six runs in total and averaging only three, much overshadowed by fellow bowler Broad's average of 52.00.

In the first Test match, Sidebottom started the first day the pick of the England bowlers, taking two wickets. The first innings ended on Day 2, Sidebottom with 4 wickets in total, 2 wickets from the last 2 balls of the innings. Despite missing out on a hat-trick with the first ball of the second innings (after forcing Jeetan Patel to edge his shot to Andrew Strauss, then cleaning Chris Martin for a duck), he went on to take the 37th Test cricket hat-trick, and the first in 2 years, in New Zealand's second innings. Dismissing Stephen Fleming (caught by Alastair Cook) with the final ball of his ninth over, he then dismissed Mathew Sinclair (also caught by Alastair Cook) and Jacob Oram (lbw) with the first two balls of his tenth over. With the dismissal of Oram he also claimed his second five wicket haul in an England Test match and when he went on to dismiss Kyle Mills and Daniel Vettori he recorded his first Test match ten wicket match.

Sidebottom went on to take another two five wicket hauls, resulting in one five-for in each Test of the series (including a first-class personal best of 7/47 in the first innings of the third Test), breaking the previous record for an England bowler in New Zealand. His spell was nominated to be the Best Test Bowling Performance of 2008 by ESPNCricinfo. As a result of his superb form within the series, taking 24 wickets to double the next best effort of Monty Panesar and Chris Martin who each took 11, he was voted Man of The Match and Series after the final Test.

Thanks to this performance in the above-mentioned series he was ranked sixth on the ICC Test Bowling Rankings, the highest ranking English bowler for 5 years. For his performances in 2008, he was named in the World Test XI by ICC. On 25 June, he was involved in a controversial incident, colliding with New Zealand batsman Elliot in a 50 over match. He was subsequently left out of the second Test against New Zealand.

He retired from international cricket on 20 September 2010. On the subject of his time with the England team, Sidebottom said "If I look back on my international career I have achieved more than I could ever have dreamed. I have had a truly fantastic period of my life with England. Winning the Twenty20 World Cup in the West Indies, my Test debut at Lords, a Test hat-trick against New Zealand, plus a Man of the Series award, are just a few of the highlights."
