= August 2007 in sports =

<<	August 2007					>>
Su	Mo	Tu	We	Th	Fr	Sa
			1	2	3	4
5	6	7	8	9	10	11
12	13	14	15	16	17	18
19	20	21	22	23	24	25
26	27	28	29	30	31
India; Sports

This list shows notable sports-related deaths, events, and notable outcomes that occurred in August of 2007.

== Deaths ==
- 31: Gay Brewer
- 28: Antonio Puerta
- 22: Butch van Breda Kolff
- 17: Eddie Griffin
- 15: Sam Pollock
- 13: Phil Rizzuto

== Sporting seasons ==
- American football
  - NCAA Division I
- Auto racing 2007:
  - Formula One
  - Champ Car
  - NASCAR NEXTEL Cup
  - NASCAR Busch Series
  - NASCAR Craftsman Truck Series
  - World Rally Championship
  - IRL
  - GP2
  - V8 Supercar
  - Rolex Sports Car Series
  - American Le Mans Series
  - FIA GT
  - Le Mans Series
  - Japan Le Mans Challenge
- Baseball 2007
  - Chinese Professional Baseball League (Taiwan)
  - Major League Baseball
- Basketball 2007:
  - NCAA Philippines
  - UAAP (Philippines)
- Canadian football:
  - Canadian Football League
- Cricket 2007:
  - England
- Cycling
  - UCI ProTour
- Football (soccer) 2006–07:
  - Argentina
  - Major League Soccer
- Football (soccer) 2007–08:
  - England
- Golf:
  - 2007 PGA Tour
  - 2007 European Tour
  - 2007 LPGA Tour
- Lacrosse 2007:
  - Major League Lacrosse
- Motorcycle racing 2007:
  - Motorcycle GP
- Rugby league 2007:
  - Super League XII
- Rugby union 2007:
  - Air New Zealand Cup
  - Australian Rugby Championship
- Shooting 2007:
  - 2007 ISSF World Cup
- Speedway:
  - Speedway Grand Prix

== 31 August 2007 (Friday) ==
- Basketball:
  - Philippine NCAA basketball tournament 2007
    - Juniors: San Beda Red Cubs 98–96 Letran Squires
    - Seniors: San Beda Red Lions 87–84 Letran Knights
    - After the second game, Letran players and San Beda supporters engaged in a brawl at the Araneta Coliseum (ABS-CBN News)

== 30 August 2007 (Thursday) ==
- American football:
  - NCAA Division I Top 25:
    - (2) LSU 45, Mississippi State 0
    - (10) Louisville 73, Murray State 10
    - (16) Rutgers 38, Buffalo 3
    - (24) Boise State 56, Weber State 7
- Basketball:
  - FIBA Americas Championship 2007 quarterfinals at Las Vegas
    - Uruguay and Canada are eliminated from contention, although Canada qualifies for the pre-Olympic qualifying tournament.

== 29 August 2007 (Wednesday) ==
- Basketball:
  - FIBA Americas Championship 2007 quarterfinals at Las Vegas
    - Mexico and Venezuela are eliminated from contention.
- Football (soccer)
  - 2007 SuperLiga finals at The Home Depot Center, Carson, California
    - Los Angeles Galaxy 1–1 C.F. Pachuca, C.F. Pachuca wins 4–3 on penalties

== 28 August 2007 (Tuesday) ==
- Basketball:
  - FIBA Americas Championship 2007 quarterfinals at Las Vegas

== 27 August 2007 (Monday) ==
- National Football League:
  - Bad Newz Kennels dog fighting investigation: Michael Vick pleads guilty to federal dog fighting charges and apologizes to fans. (AP via Yahoo)
- Major League Baseball:
  - In a complete housecleaning, the Houston Astros fire both manager Phil Garner and General Manager Tim Purpura. Cecil Cooper will take over as manager for the remainder of the season and team president Tal Smith will add interim GM duties until a replacement is named. Smith was previously Astros General Manager from 1975 through 1980. (Houston Chronicle)
  - The Cleveland Indians turn a 5–4–3 triple play in the seventh inning of their 8–3 win over the Minnesota Twins. It's the Indians' first triple play since 1992 and first on a ground ball since 1981. (AP via Yahoo)
- Basketball:
  - FIBA Americas Championship 2007 quarterfinals at Las Vegas
    - Argentina and USA secured berths for the semifinals.

== 26 August 2007 (Sunday) ==
- Football (soccer)
  - 2007 ONGC Nehru Cup at India
    - India 3–0 Kyrgyzstan
  - The 2007–08 Serie "A" season begins in Italy.
- Auto racing:
  - Formula One: Turkish Grand Prix in Istanbul, Turkey.
  (1) Felipe Massa (Brazil) (2) Kimi Räikkönen (Finland) (3) Fernando Alonso (Spain)
  - Champ Car: Belgian Champ Car Grand Prix in Heusden-Zolder, Belgium.
  (1) Sébastien Bourdais (France) (2) Bruno Junqueira (Brazil) (3) Graham Rahal (United States)
  - IRL: Motorola Indy 300 in Sonoma, California.
  (1) Scott Dixon (New Zealand) (2) Hélio Castroneves (Brazil) (3) Dario Franchitti (United Kingdom)
- Cricket
  - South African cricket team in Zimbabwe in 2007
    - South Africa 323/9 (50 ov.) beat Zimbabwe 295/7 (50 ov.) by 28 runs
      - South Africa win the series 3–0.
  - 2007–08 ICC Intercontinental Cup
    - Ireland 524/8 (dec) beat Bermuda 192 & 186 by an innings and 146 runs
      - Points: Ireland 20, Bermuda 0.
- Baseball
  - 2007 Little League World Series Championship Game
  (United States) (Georgia (U.S. state)) Warner Robins, Georgia 3, (Japan) Tokyo Kitasuna 2 (8 innings)
- Basketball
  - FIBA Americas Championship 2007 at Las Vegas
    Panama and The Virgin Islands are eliminated from the tournament.

== 25 August 2007 (Saturday) ==
- Basketball
  - FIBA Africa Championship 2007 at Angola
    - Final: Angola 86–72 Cameroon
  - FIBA Americas Championship 2007 at Las Vegas
    - Group A: Uruguay 82–79 Puerto Rico
    - Group A: Argentina 104–83 Mexico
    - Group B: United States 113–63 Canada
    - Group B: Brazil 93–89 Virgin Islands
- Auto racing:
  - NASCAR: Sharpie 500 in Bristol, Tennessee.
  (1) Carl Edwards (2) Kasey Kahne (3) Clint Bowyer
  Edwards wins his second race of the season, and clinches a spot in the Chase for the NEXTEL Cup. Matt Kenseth and Tony Stewart also clinch spots in the Chase.
- Cricket:
  - South African cricket team in Zimbabwe in 2007
    - South Africa 251/2 (39.1 overs) beat Zimbabwe 247/7 (50 overs) by 8 wickets

== 24 August 2007 (Friday) ==
- National Football League
  - The National Football League suspends Atlanta Falcons quarterback Michael Vick indefinitely and without pay after his guilty plea to criminal charges stemming from a dogfighting ring.
- Cricket:
  - Indian cricket team in England in 2007
    - India 329/7 (50 ov.) beat England 320/8 by 9 runs.
      - India and England are tied 1–1 with 5 to play.
      - Dimitri Mascarenhas scores his first ODI fifty
- Basketball:
  - FIBA Oceania Championship 2007 at Australia
    - Non-bearing game: New Zealand 67–58 Australia
  - FIBA Africa Championship 2007 at Angola
    - 3rd place: Cape Verde 53–51 Egypt
    - 5th place: Nigeria 83–82 Tunisia
  - FIBA Americas Championship 2007 at Las Vegas
    - Group A: Panama 95–90 Mexico
    - Group A: Argentina 87–75 Puerto Rico
    - Group B: Canada 93–83 Virgin Islands
    - Group B: Brazil 101–75 Venezuela

== 23 August 2007 (Thursday) ==
- Basketball:
  - FIBA Americas Championship 2007 at Las Vegas
    - Group A: Argentina 90–69 Uruguay
    - Group A: Puerto Rico 108–67 Panama
    - Group B: Canada 80–73 Venezuela
    - Group B: United States 123–59 Virgin Islands
  - FIBA Africa Championship 2007 at Angola
    - Semifinals
      - Angola 93–60 Cape Verde
      - Cameroon 58–52 Egypt
    - Classification games
      - 7th place: Central African Republic 69–63 Ivory Coast
      - 9th place: Senegal 79–68 Morocco
      - 11th place: Mali 78–74 Rwanda
      - 13th place: South Africa 97–85 Mozambique
      - 15th place: DR Congo 92–84 Liberia

== 22 August 2007 (Wednesday) ==
- Football (soccer) 2008 UEFA European Football Championship qualifying
  - Group A: Finland 2–1 Kazakhstan
  - Group A: Belgium 3–2 Serbia
  - Group A: Armenia 1–1 Portugal
  - Group D: San Marino 0–1 Cyprus
  - Group E: Estonia 2–1 Andorra
  - Group F: Northern Ireland 3–1 Liechtenstein
- Cricket
  - South African cricket team in Zimbabwe in 2007
    - South Africa 210/5 (46.5 ov.) beat Zimbabwe 206 (50 ov.) by 5 wickets
- Basketball:
  - FIBA Oceania Championship 2007 at Australia
    - Australia 93–67 New Zealand, Australia win best-of-3 series, 2–0, and clinch a berth in the 2008 Olympic tournament.
  - FIBA Americas Championship 2007 at Las Vegas
    - Group A: Uruguay 88–84 (OT) Panama
    - Group A: Mexico 100–89 Puerto Rico
    - Group B: Brazil 75–67 Canada
    - Group B: United States 112–69 Venezuela
- Major League Baseball:
  - In the first game of a doubleheader, the Texas Rangers set a modern-era (post-1900) MLB single-game record by scoring 30 runs in a 30–3 rout of the Baltimore Orioles at Oriole Park at Camden Yards. With a 9–7 victory in the second game, the Rangers also set the record for runs by a single team in a doubleheader, with 39. It is the first time a team has scored at least 30 runs since 1897.

== 21 August 2007 (Tuesday) ==
- Auto racing:
  - NASCAR: 3M Performance 400 in Brooklyn, Michigan (postponed from August 19 due to rain).
  (1) Kurt Busch (2) Martin Truex Jr. (3) Jimmie Johnson

Kurt Busch wins in a green-white-checker finish after Greg Biffle spun out with two laps remaining. Jeff Gordon and Denny Hamlin became the first to clinch spots in the Chase for the NEXTEL Cup.

- NFL:
  - The Kansas City Chiefs and running back Larry Johnson agreed to a five-year, $43.2 million (US) contract.
- College football:
  - After seven decades playing at the Miami Orange Bowl, the Miami Hurricanes will move after the 2007 season to Dolphin Stadium in nearby Miami Gardens, Florida. (AP via ESPN.com)
- Cricket
  - Indian cricket team in England in 2007
    - England 288/2 (50 ov.) beat India 184 (50 ov.) by 104 runs
- Basketball: FIBA Africa Championship 2007 quarterfinals at Angola

== 20 August 2007 (Monday) ==
- National Football League:
  - The lead attorney for Atlanta Falcons quarterback Michael Vick announces that Vick will plead guilty in a plea bargain to federal charges stemming from an investigation into his dog fighting activities. (Fox News (USA))
- Major League Baseball:
  - Against the Kansas City Royals, Chicago White Sox closer Bobby Jenks gives up a single to the first batter he faces, Joey Gathright. The hit ends Jenks' streak of consecutive batters retired at 41. Jenks, who had not allowed a base runner since July 17, remains tied with Jim Barr for the Major League record for consecutive batters retired. Jenks picks up the save in the Sox' 4–3 win.

== 19 August 2007 (Sunday) ==
- Baseball:
  - Minnesota Twins pitcher Johan Santana strikes out 17 batters in eight innings against the Texas Rangers to set a franchise record for strikeouts in a game. Twins closer Joe Nathan adds two strikeouts in the ninth and combines with Santana in a two-hit shutout. Minnesota wins, 1–0. (AP via Yahoo)

== 18 August 2007 (Saturday) ==
- Softball: 2007 Junior League World Series at Kirkland, Washington:
  - Maunabo, Puerto Rico def. Westchester–Del Rey, California 16–6.
- Baseball: 2007 Junior League World Series at Taylor, Michigan:
  - Pearl City, Hawaii def. Makati, Philippines 6–2.
- Basketball: FIBA Oceania Championship 2007 at Australia
  - Australia 79–67 New Zealand, Australia leads best-of-3 series, 1–0.

== 15 August 2007 (Wednesday) ==
- Basketball
  - Referee Tim Donaghy pleads guilty to two federal charges related to the investigation regarding betting on NBA games. (USA Today)(History and the Headlines)

== 14 August 2007 (Tuesday) ==
- Baseball:
  - Atlanta Braves manager Bobby Cox is ejected in the fifth inning of the Braves' 5–4 win over the San Francisco Giants. The ejection is the 132nd of Cox's career, breaking the record set by John McGraw more than 70 years ago. (AP via Yahoo)

== 13 August 2007 (Monday) ==
- Baseball:
  - Hall of Fame member and longtime New York Yankees shortstop and announcer Phil Rizzuto dies at the age of 89 in a nursing home in West Orange, New Jersey. (AP via Yahoo)
- Cricket:
  - Indian cricket team in England in 2007
    - 3rd Test-5th Day:India 664 & 180/6 (dec) drew England 345 & 369/6 (110 ov.)
      - India win the Test series 1–0.
        - This is India's first Test series win in England since 1986.
        - this is England's first home test series loss since 2001 against the Australians.
  - 2007–08 ICC Intercontinental Cup
    - Bermuda 183 lead Netherlands 152/0 (37 ov.) by 31 runs

== 12 August 2007 (Sunday) ==
- Golf: PGA Championship
  - Tiger Woods wins his 13th major championship by 2 strokes, over Woody Austin, with a four-day total of 272 (−8).
- Auto racing:
  - NASCAR: Centurion Boats at The Glen in Watkins Glen, New York.
  (1) Tony Stewart (2) Denny Hamlin (3) Jimmie Johnson

Stewart takes advantage of a spinout by leader Jeff Gordon with two laps remaining to win.

  - Champ Car: Grand Prix of Road America in Elkhart Lake, Wisconsin, USA.
  (1) Sébastien Bourdais (France) (2) Dan Clarke (United Kingdom) (3) Graham Rahal (United States)
- Cricket:
  - Indian cricket team in England in 2007
    - 3rd Test-4th Day:India 664 & 180/6 (dec) lead England 345 & 56/0 (20 ov.) by 444 runs
  - 2007–08 ICC Intercontinental Cup
    - Ireland 473/7 (110 ov.) drew Scotland 314
      - Points:Ireland 9, Scotland 3.
- Major League Baseball
  - Detroit Tigers right fielder Magglio Ordóñez hits two home runs in the same inning, part of an eight-run second inning that propelled the Tigers to an 11–6 victory over the Oakland Athletics. He led off the second inning with a solo home run, then hit a three-run home run on his second at-bat of the inning. He is the second Tiger to accomplish the feat—the first was hall-of-famer Al Kaline, who did it in 1955 against the Athletics (who represented Kansas City at the time). For the game, Ordóñez went 2-for-3 with 2 walks.

== 11 August 2007 (Saturday) ==
- Auto racing:
  - IRL: Meijer Indy 300 in Sparta, Kentucky.
  (1) Tony Kanaan (Brazil) (2) Scott Dixon (New Zealand) (3) A. J. Foyt IV (United States)
- Cricket:
  - Indian cricket team in England in 2007
    - 3rd Test-3rd Day:India 664 lead England 326/9 (96 ov.) by 338 runs
  - 2007–08 ICC Intercontinental Cup
    - Scotland 314 leads Ireland 179/4 (44 ov.) by 135 runs.
      - No play on day 3.
- Football:
  - Opening Day of the 2007–08 English Premier League season.
- Golf: PGA Championship
  - Sergio García is disqualified after signing an incorrect scorecard following the 3rd round. The scorecard, kept by playing partner Boo Weekley, showed a par 4 on the 17th hole, but his actual score was a 5. Tiger Woods held a 3 stroke lead, over Stephen Ames, with a three-day total of 203(−7).
- Rugby union: 2007 Rugby World Cup warm-ups
  - England 15–21 France at Twickenham, London
  - Scotland 31–21 Ireland at Murrayfield, Edinburgh

== 10 August 2007 (Friday) ==
- Cricket:
  - Indian cricket team in England in 2007
    - 3rd Test-2nd Day:India 664 lead England 24/1 (8 ov.) by 640 runs
      - Anil Kumble scores his maiden test century.
  - 2007–08 ICC Intercontinental Cup
    - Scotland 314 leads Ireland 179/4 (44 ov.) by 135 runs

== 9 August 2007 (Thursday) ==
- Cricket:
  - Indian cricket team in England in 2007
    - 3rd Test-1st Day:India 316/4 (90 ov.) lead England by 316 runs
  - 2007–08 ICC Intercontinental Cup
    - Scotland 183/7 (101 ov.) leads Ireland by 183 runs

== 7 August 2007 (Tuesday) ==
- Tennis:
  - East West Bank Classic WTA Tournament
    - Sania Mirza beat Martina Hingis 6–2, 2–6, 6–4 to enter the quarterfinals of the event.
- Cricket
  - Twenty20 World Championship
    - Lalchand Rajput appointed manager of Indian team for the championship.
- Baseball:
  - Barry Bonds home run chase
    - Bonds hits his 756th career home run in the fifth inning of the San Francisco Giants' game against the Washington Nationals at AT&T Park. Bonds hits the 435-foot shot to right-center field against pitcher Mike Bacsik in the bottom of the fifth inning with one out at 8:51 PM PDT to pass Hank Aaron. Bonds was greeted at home plate by his family, his teammates, and his godfather, Willie Mays. The AT&T Park video board then displayed a videotaped message of congratulations from Aaron, who had earlier expressed disinterest in Bonds' chase. The Nationals, though, came back and won the game by a score of 8–6.
    - The man who caught the historic ball was identified as Matt Murphy, a 22-year-old from Queens, New York who is a fan of the New York Mets and was on a stopover en route to Australia. Murphy caught the ball, survived a near-riot and was given a police escort. (Newsday.com)

== 6 August 2007 (Monday) ==
- Cricket
  - Twenty20 World Championship: Indian squad announced. Mahendra Singh Dhoni named captain. Yusuf Pathan given chance.
  - Indian cricket team in England in 2007: Indian squad announced. Rahul Dravid named captain. Munaf Patel recalled and Sreesanth left out.

== 5 August 2007 (Sunday) ==
- Baseball: New York Mets pitcher Tom Glavine wins his 300th game, giving up two runs on six hits in 6 1/3 innings in the Mets' 8–3 win over the Chicago Cubs. He is the 23rd — and perhaps last — pitcher to reach the milestone. (AP via Yahoo)
- Auto racing:
  - Formula One: Hungarian Grand Prix in Budapest, Hungary.
  (1) Lewis Hamilton (United Kingdom) (2) Kimi Räikkönen (Finland) (3) Nick Heidfeld (Germany)
  - NASCAR: Pennsylvania 500 in Long Pond, Pennsylvania.
  (1) Kurt Busch (2) Dale Earnhardt Jr. (3) Denny Hamlin
  - IRL: Firestone Indy 400 in Brooklyn, Michigan.
  (1) Tony Kanaan (Brazil) (2) Marco Andretti (United States) (3) Scott Sharp (United States)
- Football (soccer):
  - FA Community Shield:
    - Manchester United 1–1 Chelsea, Manchester United win 3–0 on penalties.
- Women's Golf:
  - Lorena Ochoa wins the Women's British Open at the Old Course at St Andrews for her first major championship. Ochoa shot +1 for a 4-day total of 287 (−5) and a 4 stroke victory over Jee Young Lee and Maria Hjorth.
- Basketball:
  - FIBA Asia Championship Final round at Tokushima, Japan:
    - 7th place: Qatar 86–82 Japan
    - 5th place: Jordan 97–74 Chinese Taipei
    - 3rd place: South Korea 80–76 Kazakhstan
    - Final: Iran 74–69 Lebanon
  - FIBA Under-19 World Championship for Women at Bratislava, Slovakia:
    - Final: United States 99–57 Sweden

== 4 August 2007 (Saturday) ==
- Major League Baseball:
  - Barry Bonds ties Hank Aaron as the all-time leader with 755 home runs to lead off the 2nd inning against the San Diego Padres' Clay Hensley.
  - Alex Rodriguez becomes the youngest player in MLB history to hit 500 career home runs at 32 years and 8 days in a 16–8 victory by the New York Yankees over the Kansas City Royals.
- Basketball:
  - FIBA Asia Championship at Tokushima, Japan:
    - Classification games:
      - 15th place: India 82–77 United Arab Emirates
      - 13th place: Hong Kong 72–66 Kuwait
      - 11th place: Syria 108–79 Indonesia
      - 9th place: Philippines 78–76 China
    - Semifinals:
      - Lebanon 76–74 South Korea – Fadi El Khatib top-scored with 32 points as Korea turned the ball over on their last two possessions to halt their own run.
      - Iran 75–62 Kazakhstan – The Kazakhs were daunted with 7–26 first quarter score to prevent further incursions.
- Rugby union: 2007 Rugby World Cup warm-ups
  - England 62–5 Wales at Twickenham, London
  - Argentina 70–14 Chile at CASI, Buenos Aires
- Cricket:
  - 2007–08 ICC Intercontinental Cup
    - Scotland 452 beat Netherlands 255 & 138 by an innings and 59 runs
- Swimming:
  - Dara Torres wins the 50-meter freestyle competition at the 2007 United States National Swimming Championships, becoming, at age 40, the oldest American to win a championship in US history.

== 3 August 2007 (Friday) ==
- Major League Baseball
  - Detroit Tigers infielder Neifi Pérez is suspended for 80 games by Major League Baseball for failing a third drug test.

== 2 August 2007 (Thursday) ==
- Basketball:
  - FIBA Asia Championship quarterfinals at Tokushima, Japan:
    - Group E: Qatar 87–74 Chinese Taipei
    - Group E: Lebanon 82–60 Iran
      - Lebanon wins group E; both teams advance to the semifinals.
    - Group F: Kazakhstan 75–73 South Korea – Clutch free-throws by Anton Ponomarev kept the Kazakhs in contention.
      - With Japan's defeat of Jordan, both Kazakhstan and Korea advance to the semifinals.
    - Group F: Japan 71–68 Jordan – Jordan's Rashiem Wright missed a three-pointer that could've put the game into overtime.
      - Jordan is eliminated from championship contention.
- Major League Baseball
  - A game between the Minnesota Twins and the Kansas City Royals scheduled for today at the Hubert H. Humphrey Metrodome in Minneapolis, is postponed due to the collapse of the I-35W Mississippi River bridge. The game the previous day began less than an hour after the actual collapse, but officials told the Twins to proceed with that game because cancelling would have sent thousands of vehicles onto the roads and hampered rescue efforts. The groundbreaking ceremony for the new Twins ballpark has also been postponed. (ESPN)

== 1 August 2007 (Wednesday) ==
- Basketball:
  - FIBA Asia Championship quarterfinals at Tokushima, Japan:
    - Group E: Lebanon 95–64 Chinese Taipei
    - Group E: Iran 95–87 Qatar
      - Lebanon and Iran advance to the semifinals.
      - Qatar and Chinese Taipei are eliminated from championship contention.
    - Group F: Jordan 82–73 Kazakhstan
    - Group F: South Korea 93–83 Japan
      - Japan is eliminated from championship contention.
