= September 2007 in sports =

<<	September 2007					>>
Su	Mo	Tu	We	Th	Fr	Sa
						1
2	3	4	5	6	7	8
9	10	11	12	13	14	15
16	17	18	19	20	21	22
23	24	25	26	27	28	29
30
Sports

This list shows notable sports-related deaths, events, and notable outcomes that occurred in September of 2007.

== Deaths ==
- 29 : Gyula Zsivótzky
- 26 : Bill Wirtz
- 15 : Colin McRae
- 14 : Benny Vansteelant
- 11 : Ian Porterfield

== Sporting seasons ==
- American football
  - NCAA Division I
  - National Football League
- Auto racing 2007:
  - Formula One
  - Champ Car
  - NASCAR NEXTEL Cup
  - NASCAR Busch Series
  - NASCAR Craftsman Truck Series
  - World Rally Championship
  - GP2
  - V8 Supercar
  - American Le Mans Series
  - FIA GT
  - Le Mans Series
  - Japan Le Mans Challenge
  - A1 Grand Prix
- Baseball 2007
  - Chinese Professional Baseball League (Taiwan)
  - Major League Baseball
  - Nippon Professional Baseball
- Basketball 2007:
  - UAAP (Philippines) Semifinal
- Canadian football:
  - Canadian Football League
- Cricket 2007:
  - England
- Cycling
  - UCI ProTour
- Football (soccer) 2006–07:
  - Major League Soccer
- Football (soccer) 2007–08:
  - England
  - Italy
  - Germany
  - Spain
  - France
  - Argentina
  - Denmark
- Golf:
  - 2007 PGA Tour
  - 2007 European Tour
  - 2007 LPGA Tour
- Ice hockey 2007–08
  - National Hockey League
- Lacrosse 2007:
  - Major League Lacrosse
- Motorcycle racing 2007:
  - Motorcycle GP
- Rugby league 2007:
  - Super League XII
- Rugby union 2007:
  - Air New Zealand Cup
  - Australian Rugby Championship
  - Currie Cup
- Shooting 2007:
  - 2007 ISSF World Cup
- Speedway:
  - Speedway Grand Prix

== 30 September 2007 (Sunday) ==
- Major League Baseball: National League playoff races
  - Florida Marlins 8, New York Mets 1
  - Philadelphia Phillies 6, Washington Nationals 1
    - The Mets complete their historic September collapse, and the Phillies win the NL East. They will play the wild card winner in the NL Division Series.
  - Milwaukee Brewers 11, San Diego Padres 6
  - Colorado Rockies 4, Arizona Diamondbacks 3
    - The Padres and Rockies finish in a tie for the NL wild card. The teams will meet in Denver in a one-game playoff, with the winner to meet the Phils in the NLDS.
    - Even though they lost on the last day of the season, the D-backs still clinch the NL West title. They will go against the Chicago Cubs in their playoff series.
- Auto racing:
  - Formula One: Japanese Grand Prix at Oyama, Japan:
  (1) Lewis Hamilton (United Kingdom) (2) Heikki Kovalainen (Finland) (3) Kimi Räikkönen (Finland)
  - NEXTEL Cup: LifeLock 400 at Kansas City, Kansas:
  (1) Greg Biffle (2) Clint Bowyer (3) Jimmie Johnson
  - The Chase for the NEXTEL Cup standings are rocked in a race that was red-flagged twice due to rain, shortened by 85 miles due to darkness, and finished under caution. Of the 12 drivers in the Chase, seven finished 29th or worse. The day started with the top six drivers separated by 28 points; now, the only drivers within 100 points of new Chase leader Johnson are Jeff Gordon and Bowyer.
- American football:
  - National Football League Week 4:
    - Green Bay Packers 23, Minnesota Vikings 16
      - Brett Favre completes a touchdown pass to Greg Jennings in the first quarter to become the sole owner of the career passing TD record, surpassing Dan Marino. Favre would later go on to throw another touchdown, putting the total at 422 as the Green Bay Packers go 4–0 for the first time since 1998.
    - Oakland Raiders 35, Miami Dolphins 17
      - Daunte Culpepper rushes for three touchdowns and passes for two; the Raiders rush for 299 yards.
    - Buffalo Bills 17, New York Jets 14
      - Buffalo rookie quarterback Trent Edwards and a defense that picks off Chad Pennington twice in the fourth quarter lead the Bills to their first win.
    - Atlanta Falcons 26, Houston Texans 16
      - Quarterback Joey Harrington paces the Falcons, completing 23 of 29 passes for 223 yards and two touchdowns.
    - Detroit Lions 37, Chicago Bears 27
      - The surprising 3–1 Lions set a league record with 34 fourth-quarter points, including returns of an interception and an onside kick for touchdowns; new Bears starting quarterback Brian Griese throws three interceptions.
    - Cleveland Browns 27, Baltimore Ravens 13
      - Derek Anderson throws two first-quarter touchdowns, and the Browns defense holds Baltimore to 13 points on eight Baltimore drives into Cleveland territory.
    - Dallas Cowboys 35, St. Louis Rams 7
      - Tony Romo throws for 331 yards and three touchdown and runs for a fourth score.
    - Tampa Bay Buccaneers 20, Carolina Panthers 7
      - The Bucs defense makes things miserable for backup Panthers quarterback David Carr and his offense; Carr throws for only 155 yards on 41 attempts.
    - Seattle Seahawks 23, San Francisco 49ers 3
      - With starting QB Alex Smith out with an early injury, 49ers second-stringer Trent Dilfer completes only 12 of 33 passes, throws two interceptions and is sacked five times.
    - Kansas City Chiefs 30, San Diego Chargers 16
      - Tyron Brackenridge, a rookie free agent defensive back on the Chiefs, returns a Philip Rivers fumble 50 yards for a touchdown in the fourth quarter.
    - Arizona Cardinals 21, Pittsburgh Steelers 14
      - The Cardinals go ahead in the fourth quarter when Steve Breaston returns a punt 73 yards for a touchdown; Arizona's defense sacks Ben Roethlisberger four times and forces two costly interceptions.
    - Indianapolis Colts 38, Denver Broncos 20
      - A banged-up Colts team scores on six of its last eight possessions, including three Peyton Manning touchdown passes and one Manning TD sneak.
    - New York Giants 16, Philadelphia Eagles 3
  - College football polls:
    - LSU takes over the top ranking in the AP Poll from USC after the Trojans' sloppy 27–24 win over Washington. USC remains atop the Coaches and Harris Polls, with LSU second. USC becomes the first team to lose the #1 ranking in either poll after a victory since 2002. ESPN.com
    - After a tumultuous week that saw 10 of last week's Top 25 lose to lower-ranked or unranked teams, the remainder of the poll is completely overhauled, with only one team (Nebraska) holding down the same position in the AP Poll as last week. Highlights:
      - Cal, Ohio State, and Wisconsin rise to #3 through #5 in all three polls.
      - Two weeks after earning the school's first ranking in history, South Florida enters the top 10, at #6 AP/#9 Coaches/#10 Harris.
      - Boston College enters the top 10 for the first time since 1992 (#7 AP/#6 Coaches and Harris).
      - Kentucky enters the top 10 for the first time since 1977 (#8 AP and Coaches/#7 Harris).
- Basketball:
  - FIBA Africa Championship for Women at Dakar, Senegal
    - Final: Mali 65–58 Senegal
      - Mali qualifies to Olympics; Senegal qualifies to the pre-Olympic wildcard tournament.
    - Third place: Angola 73–58 Mozambique
      - Angola qualifies to the pre-Olympic wildcard tournament.
  - FIBA Americas Championship for Women at Valdivia, Chile
    - Final: United States 101–71 Cuba
      - USA qualifies to Olympics; Cuba qualifies to the pre-Olympic wildcard tournament.
    - Third place: Brazil 73–41 Argentina
      - Both teams qualify to the pre-Olympic wildcard tournament.
  - UAAP men's basketball semifinal at Quezon City, Philippines.
    - La Salle 65–60 Ateneo
      - More than 23,000 people inside the Araneta Coliseum saw the Green Archers defeat the Blue Eagles in a knockout game to determine University of the East's Finals opponent.
- Football (soccer):
  - 2007 FIFA Women's World Cup in China
  - Final:
    - Germany 2–0 Brazil, Shanghai
  - Third-place playoff
    - Norway 1–4 United States, Shanghai
  - Germany become the first women's soccer side to successfully defend a major championship.
- Golf:
  - The United States team defeats the International team 19 1/2–14 1/2 in the Presidents Cup in Montréal. This is the first time that Team USA has won the Presidents Cup outside the USA. Mike Weir gives his fellow Canadians a consolation prize by defeating world #1 Tiger Woods 1-up in their singles match.
  - Team Great Britain & Ireland win The Seve Trophy for the third consecutive meeting, defeating Team Continental Europe 16 1/2–11 1/2 in the Republic of Ireland.
- Rugby league: NRL Grand Final
  - Melbourne Storm 34–8 Manly-Warringah Sea Eagles at Telstra Stadium
- Rugby union: 2007 Rugby World Cup in France
  - Pool D: France 64–7 Georgia at Marseille
  - Pool D: Ireland 15–30 Argentina at Paris
    - Argentina secure top spot in pool D, and assure themselves of a meeting with Scotland in Paris next Sunday. France book an appointment in Cardiff with New Zealand next Saturday.
  - Pool A: South Africa 64–15 United States at Montpellier

== 29 September 2007 (Saturday) ==
- Major League Baseball:
  - American League:
    - Boston Red Sox 6, Minnesota Twins 4
    - Kansas City Royals 4, Cleveland Indians 3
      - Boston clinches the No. 1 seed in the AL playoffs; Cleveland is No. 2.
  - National League playoff races:
    - New York Mets 13, Florida Marlins 0
      - John Maine carries a no-hitter into the eighth inning, and the Mets stop their slide in a game that featured a bench-clearing brawl in the fifth inning.
    - Washington Nationals 4, Philadelphia Phillies 2
      - The Phillies fall back into a tie with the Mets for the NL East lead. If the teams remain tied after Sunday's season-closing games, they will meet in a one-game playoff Monday in Philadelphia.
    - Milwaukee Brewers 4, San Diego Padres 3 (11 innings)
      - Tony Gwynn Jr. victimizes his father's former team with a two-out triple off Trevor Hoffman in the bottom of the ninth to tie the game, and the Brewers go on to win. The Padres' loss gives Arizona both the NL West title and home-field advantage throughout the NL playoffs.
    - Colorado Rockies 11, Arizona Diamondbacks 1
      - The Rockies remain alive in the wild-card race.
- American football:
  - NCAA Division I FBS AP Top 25:
    - (1) USC 27, Washington 24
      - The Trojans outgain the Huskies, 463 yards to 188, but Washington remains in the game until the end due to USC miscues.
    - (2) LSU 34, Tulane 9
    - Colorado 27, (3) Oklahoma 24
      - The Buffaloes score 17 unanswered points to tie the game, then win on a last-second 45-yard field goal by Kevin Eberhart.
    - Auburn 20, (4) Florida 17
      - Wes Byrum kicks the game-winning 43-yard field goal as the Tigers top the Gators for the second-straight year.
    - (6) California 31, (11) Oregon 24
      - With seconds remaining, Golden Bears cornerback Marcus Ezeff forces Ducks wide receiver Cameron Colvin to fumble the ball on Cal's 1-yard line. The ball goes into and out of the end zone, resulting in a touchback and Cal win.
    - Kansas State 41, (7) Texas 21
      - The Wildcats return a punt, kickoff and one of Colt McCoy's four interceptions for touchdowns.
    - (8) Ohio State 30, Minnesota 7
    - (9) Wisconsin 37, Michigan State 34
    - Maryland 34, (10) Rutgers 24
      - Maryland puts up 246 rushing yards on the Scarlet Knights and wins despite an injury to starting quarterback Jordan Steffy.
    - (12) Boston College 24, Massachusetts 14
    - Georgia Tech 13, (13) Clemson 3
      - The Tigers miss four field goals, fumble a kickoff and have a punt blocked.
    - (14) Kentucky 45, Florida Atlantic 17
      - Andre' Woodson's major-college record for most consecutive pass attempts without an interception ends at 325, but he also throws for a career-high five TDs.
    - (15) Georgia 45, Mississippi 17
    - (16) South Carolina 38, Mississippi State 21
    - (17) Virginia Tech 17, North Carolina 10
      - The Hokies offense sputters, but the defense comes up with key takeaways and fourth-down stops.
    - (19) Hawaiʻi 48, Idaho 20
    - Illinois 27, (21) Penn State 20
      - The Nittany Lions' Anthony Morelli is intercepted as he threw for the end zone on the last play of the game, giving Ron Zook's surprise Illini a 5–1 record.
    - Florida State 21, (22) Alabama 14
    - (23) Arizona State 41, Stanford 3
    - (24) Cincinnati 52, San Diego State 23
    - (25) Nebraska 35, Iowa State 17
- Basketball:
  - FIBA Oceania Championship for Women at Dunedin, New Zealand:
    - Final Australia 87–46 New Zealand – New Zealand qualify for the 2008 Olympics since Australia already qualified by virtue of winning at the 2006 FIBA World Championship for Women.
  - UAAP basketball Finals at Manila.
    - Juniors: La Salle 98–92 (OT) Ateneo, La Salle wins series, 2–0
    - Women: Ateneo 62–58 UP, Ateneo wins series, 2–0
- Australian rules football:
  - Australian Football League Grand Final:
    - Geelong 24.19 (163) def. Port Adelaide 6.8 (44) at the Melbourne Cricket Ground.
- Cricket:
  - Australian cricket team in India in 2007-08
    - 1st ODI-match abandoned
- Football (soccer):
  - Portsmouth 7–4 Reading
    - This is the highest-scoring match in the history of the English Premier League.
- Ice hockey:
  - National Hockey League season openers:
    - Los Angeles Kings 4–1 Anaheim Ducks
- Rugby league:
  - Super League Play-Offs: Elimination Semi-Final
    - Hull F.C. 18–21 Wigan Warriors at KC Stadium
- Rugby union: 2007 Rugby World Cup in France
  - Pool B: Australia 37–6 Canada at Bordeaux
  - Pool B: Wales 34–38 Fiji at Nantes
    - In a classic game and major shock, Wales fail to get past the pool stage for the first time ever, while Fiji set up a quarter-final match against South Africa.
  - Pool C: New Zealand 85–8 Romania at Toulouse
  - Pool C: Scotland 18–16 Italy at Saint-Étienne

== 28 September 2007 (Friday) ==
- American football:
  - NCAA Division I FBS AP Top 25:
    - (18) South Florida 21, (5) West Virginia 13
      - The Bulls, a team that has only played Division I football for 10 years, take a 21–3 lead and never look back to give West Virginia its first loss of the year. To add injury to insult, Mountaineers quarterback and Heisman Trophy candidate Pat White suffers an injury in the 2nd quarter that caused him to leave the game.
- Major League Baseball:
  - American League playoff races:
    - Boston Red Sox 5, Minnesota Twins 2
    - Baltimore Orioles 10, New York Yankees 9 (10 innings)
      - The Yankees take a 9–6 lead into the bottom of the ninth, but Mariano Rivera blows the save, and Melvin Mora's bunt single in the 10th drives in the winning run and clinches the AL East for the Bosox. The Division Series are now set, with Boston playing Los Angeles and the Yankees playing Cleveland.
  - National League playoff races:
    - Philadelphia Phillies 6, Washington Nationals 0
    - Florida Marlins 7, New York Mets 4
      - The Phillies take a one-game lead in the NL East, and the Mets fall 2 games behind San Diego in the wild-card race with two games to play.
    - Chicago Cubs 6, Cincinnati Reds 0
    - San Diego Padres 6, Milwaukee Brewers 3
      - With the Brewers' loss, the Cubs win the NL Central. The Padres take a 2-game lead over the Mets for the wild card.
    - Arizona Diamondbacks 4, Colorado Rockies 2
      - The Diamondbacks end the Rockies' 11-game winning streak, stay one game ahead of San Diego, and clinch a playoff berth.
  - Other news:
    - The Houston Astros name interim manager Cecil Cooper as their permanent manager and sign him to a two-year contract. (AP via Yahoo)
- Rugby league:
  - Super League Play-Offs: Qualification Match
    - St. Helens 10–8 Leeds Rhinos at Knowsley Road
- Rugby union: 2007 Rugby World Cup in France
  - Pool A: England 36–20 Tonga at Paris
    - In a winner-take-all showdown for second place and a quarterfinal date against Australia, England win comfortably, with Paul Sackey scoring two tries.

== 27 September 2007 (Thursday) ==
- Major League Baseball playoff races:
  - American League:
    - Minnesota Twins 5, Boston Red Sox 4
    - New York Yankees 3, Tampa Bay Devil Rays 1
      - The Bosox slip to a 2-game lead over the Yankees in the AL East; their magic number remains 2.
  - National League:
    - St. Louis Cardinals 3, New York Mets 0
    - Philadelphia Phillies 6, Atlanta Braves 4
      - The Phillies reach a tie for first place in the NL East for the first time this season. Philadelphia first baseman Ryan Howard strikes out twice; his first strikeout, his 196th on the season, breaks Adam Dunn's record for most strikeouts in a season.
    - Florida Marlins 6, Chicago Cubs 4
      - The Cubbies are swept for the series and the season by the last-place Marlins, but their lead in the NL Central stays at 2 games thanks to the Brewers' loss.
    - San Diego Padres 9, Milwaukee Brewers 5
      - The Padres end the day as they began it—1 game behind the D-backs in the NL West, and 1 game ahead in the wild card race.
    - Arizona Diamondbacks 8, Pittsburgh Pirates 0
      - Starting pitcher Micah Owings not only throws 6 1/3 scoreless innings, but also goes 4-for-4 with three doubles and three RBI as the D-backs maintain their lead in the NL West.
    - Colorado Rockies 10, Los Angeles Dodgers 4
      - The Rockies extend their franchise-record winning streak to 11, but stay 2 games behind the division-leading D-backs and 1 game back of the wild card-leading Padres.
- Basketball:
  - UAAP men's basketball semifinal at Quezon City.
    - Ateneo 65–64 La Salle
      - Ateneo forces a knockout game.
- Football (soccer):
  - 2007 FIFA Women's World Cup Semifinal in China
    - United States 0–4 Brazil, Hangzhou
      - Brazil ends the USA's 51-match unbeaten streak, handing them their first loss under current coach Greg Ryan. It is also the worst loss in the history of the US women's team.
      - After the match, US goalkeeper Hope Solo, whom Ryan had benched in favor of veteran Briana Scurry, causes controversy by criticizing both Ryan's coaching decisions and Scurry's performance.

== 26 September 2007 (Wednesday) ==
- Major League Baseball playoff races:
  - American League:
    - Boston Red Sox 11, Oakland Athletics 6
    - New York Yankees 12, Tampa Bay Devil Rays 4
    - Detroit Tigers 9, Minnesota Twins 4
      - The Red Sox retain their 3-game over the Yankees in the AL East and cut their magic number to 2. By winning, the Bronx Bombers eliminate the Tigers and assure themselves a spot in the postseason.
  - National League:
    - Washington Nationals 9, New York Mets 6
    - Philadelphia Phillies 5, Atlanta Braves 2
      - The Phillies close to within 1 game of the Mets in the NL East, and remain a game back in the wild card race.
    - Florida Marlins 7, Chicago Cubs 4
    - St. Louis Cardinals 7, Milwaukee Brewers 3
      - Although the Cubs lose their 9th straight matchup against the Marlins over the last two seasons, they keep their 2-game lead over the Brewers in the NL Central.
    - Pittsburgh Pirates 5, Arizona Diamondbacks 1
      - The D-backs' lead in the NL West drops to 1 game over the Padres and 2 over the surging Rockies.
    - San Diego Padres 11, San Francisco Giants 3
      - The Padres retain their 1-game lead over the Phillies and Rockies for the wild card.
    - Colorado Rockies 2, Los Angeles Dodgers 0
      - The Rockies continue their recent surge with their franchise-record 10th straight win.
- Basketball:
  - Philippine NCAA basketball tournament Finals at the Araneta Coliseum
    - Juniors: (1) San Sebastian 88–83 Letran (2), San Sebastian wins series, 2–0
    - Seniors: (1) San Beda 74–64 Letran (2), San Beda wins series, 2–0
- Rugby union: 2007 Rugby World Cup in France
  - Pool A: Samoa 25–21 United States at Saint-Étienne
    - The USA fight back from being 22–3 down at half time, but both countries fail to progress from the group stage.
  - Pool D: Georgia 30–0 Namibia at Lens
    - Georgia's first ever win in the Rugby World Cup.
- Football (soccer):
  - 2007 FIFA Women's World Cup Semifinal in China
    - Germany 3–0 Norway, Tianjin

== 25 September 2007 (Tuesday) ==
- Major League Baseball playoff races:
  - American League:
    - Boston Red Sox 7, Oakland Athletics 3
    - Tampa Bay Devil Rays 7, New York Yankees 6, 10 innings
    - Detroit Tigers 8, Minnesota Twins 0
      - Tampa Bay catcher Dioner Navarro's walk-off home run gives the Red Sox a 3-game lead in the AL East and keeps the Tigers mathematically alive for a wild-card spot.
  - National League:
    - Washington Nationals 10, New York Mets 9
    - Atlanta Braves 10, Philadelphia Phillies 6
      - The Mets remain 2 games ahead of the Phillies in the NL East. With the Padres and the Rockies both winning, the Phillies are now tied with the Rockies at a game back in the wild card race.
    - Florida Marlins 4, Chicago Cubs 2
    - Milwaukee Brewers 9, St. Louis Cardinals 1
      - The Brewers close to within 2 games of the Cubs in the NL Central. Also, the Brewers' Prince Fielder becomes the youngest player ever to hit 50 homers in a season, and also joins his father Cecil as the only father-and-son duo to do so.
    - Pittsburgh Pirates 6, Arizona Diamondbacks 5
      - The D-backs give the teams chasing them in the NL West a chance to close the gap.
    - San Diego Padres 6, San Francisco Giants 4
      - The Padres claw back in the top of the 9th to beat the Giants, keeping their one-game lead in the wild card race intact.
    - Colorado Rockies 9, Los Angeles Dodgers 7
      - The streaking Rockies win their 9th straight, tying a franchise record. They are now tied with the Phillies at one game back in the wild card race.
- American football:
  - A grand jury in Surry County, Virginia indicts Michael Vick and three co-defendants on state charges related to a dog fighting ring operated on a Vick-owned property in the county. (AP via ESPN.com)
- Rugby union: 2007 Rugby World Cup in France
  - Pool B: Canada 12–12 Japan at Bordeaux
  - Pool C: Romania 14–10 Portugal at Toulouse

== 24 September 2007 (Monday) ==
- Major League Baseball playoff races:
  - American League:
    - Minnesota Twins 2, Detroit Tigers 0
      - The Twins leave the Tigers on the brink of elimination from the wild-card race.
    - Toronto Blue Jays 4, New York Yankees 1
      - The Yankees drop to 2 games behind the idle Boston Red Sox in the AL East, but the Twins' victory now means that a Yanks win or a Tigers loss puts the Bronx Bombers in the postseason.
  - National League:
    - Washington Nationals 13, New York Mets 4
      - The Mets' lead over the idle Philadelphia Phillies in the NL East drops to 2 games.
    - Milwaukee Brewers 13, St. Louis Cardinals 5
      - The Brewers close to within 3 games of the idle Chicago Cubs in the NL Central.
    - San Francisco Giants 9, San Diego Padres 4
      - The Padres drop into a tie for the wild-card lead with Philadelphia.
- American football:
  - College football polls:
    - USC and LSU remain 1–2 in both the AP and Coaches polls. The identities of the top nine teams in both polls remain the same, with minor shuffling below the top two. Other highlights:
    - After defeating Arkansas, Kentucky reach #14 AP/#15 Coaches, their highest ranking since 1977.
    - Cincinnati is ranked for the first time since 1976.
    - Arizona State becomes the fourth school that first-year coach Dennis Erickson has guided into the polls. Only Lou Holtz (five) has led more schools into the rankings.
  - National Football League Week 3:
    - Tennessee Titans 31, New Orleans Saints 14
      - Last year's NFC runner-up falls to 0–3, with Drew Brees throwing four interceptions, one of which was returned for a touchdown, and losing a fumble. Vince Young throws two TD passes for the Titans.
- Cricket
  - 2007 ICC World Twenty20 Final
    - India 157/5 (20 ov.) beat Pakistan 152 all out (19.3 ov.) by 5 runs

== 23 September 2007 (Sunday) ==
- Major League Baseball playoff races:
  - American League:
    - Cleveland Indians 6, Oakland Athletics 2
    - Detroit Tigers 7, Kansas City Royals 2
      - The Indians' win clinches the AL Central. The Tigers remain alive, barely, in the wild-card race.
    - Los Angeles Angels 7, Seattle Mariners 4
      - The Angels clinch the AL West.
    - Tampa Bay Devil Rays 5, Boston Red Sox 4
    - New York Yankees 7, Toronto Blue Jays 5
      - The Yankees move within 1 1/2 games of Boston.
  - National League:
    - New York Mets 7, Florida Marlins 6, 11 innings
    - Washington Nationals 5, Philadelphia Phillies 3
      - The Phillies' loss in the last game at RFK Stadium puts them 2 1/2 games behind the Mets in the NL East.
    - Atlanta Braves 7, Milwaukee Brewers 4
    - Chicago Cubs 8, Pittsburgh Pirates 0
      - The Cubs widen their lead in the NL Central to 3 1/2 games over the slumping Brewers.
    - Los Angeles Dodgers 7, Arizona Diamondbacks 1
    - Colorado Rockies 7, San Diego Padres 3
      - The Rockies' eighth-straight win brings them within 4 games of Arizona in the NL West and 1 1/2 games of San Diego in the wild-card chase. The game is the least of the Padres' losses, as left fielder Milton Bradley is lost for the season with a torn ACL suffered when his manager Bud Black spun him to the ground to keep him from confronting umpire Mike Winters.
- Auto racing:
  - NASCAR Chase for the NEXTEL Cup: Dodge Dealers 400 at Dover, Delaware
  (1) Carl Edwards (United States) (2) Greg Biffle (United States) (3) Dale Earnhardt Jr. (United States)
- American football:
  - National Football League Week 3:
    - Philadelphia Eagles 56, Detroit Lions 21
      - The Eagles get their first win of the season, with Donovan McNabb throwing for 381 yards and four first-half touchdowns. Kevin Curtis was on the receiving end for 221 yards and three TDs, while Brian Westbrook had over 100 yards of both rushing and receiving and the other three Philly TDs.
    - New York Jets 31, Miami Dolphins 28
      - Chad Pennington comes back from injury to throw for two touchdowns and run for another; Jets kick returner Leon Washington returns a kickoff for another touchdown.
    - New England Patriots 38, Buffalo Bills 7
      - Tom Brady goes 22-for-28 for 291 yards and four touchdowns as the Pats roll again.
    - Baltimore Ravens 26, Arizona Cardinals 23
      - Replacing an ineffective Matt Leinart, Kurt Warner leads the Cardinals back from a 23–6 fourth-quarter deficit, but Matt Stover hits a 46-yard field goal to win the game for Baltimore.
    - Tampa Bay Buccaneers 24, St. Louis Rams 3
      - The Bucs hold St. Louis quarterback Marc Bulger to 116 yards and intercept him three times.
    - Pittsburgh Steelers 37, San Francisco 49ers 16
      - The 3–0 Steelers rush for 205 yards and score touchdowns on a kickoff and an interception return.
    - Indianapolis Colts 30, Houston Texans, 24
      - The Colts hold an injury-depleted Texan offense to 40 rushing yards and pick off Houston quarterback Matt Schaub twice in the third quarter.
    - Green Bay Packers 31, San Diego Chargers 24
      - Brett Favre throws three touchdown passes to put himself level with Dan Marino on the all-time NFL list for career TD passes, with 420.
    - Kansas City Chiefs 13, Minnesota Vikings 10
      - Damon Huard hits Chiefs receiver Dwayne Bowe with the game-winning 16-yard touchdown pass, while the Kansas City defense frustrates Vikings backup quarterback Kelly Holcomb.
    - Oakland Raiders 26, Cleveland Browns 24
      - A week after a timeout just before the snap nullified a game-winning Raiders field goal, Oakland coach Lane Kiffin uses the same strategy to nullify Phil Dawson's would-be successful attempt at a game-winning field goal. Raiders defensive tackle Tommy Kelly blocks the ensuing attempt.
    - Jacksonville Jaguars 23, Denver Broncos 14
      - Jacksonville's defense shuts down the Broncos' running game and ends the Broncos attempt at a comeback with an interception.
    - Seattle Seahawks 24, Cincinnati Bengals 21
      - Matt Hasselbeck throws for three touchdowns, including the game-winner to Nate Burleson with 1 minute left.
    - New York Giants 24, Washington Redskins 17
      - The Redskins get a first-down on New York's 1-yard line in the final minute, but a successful goal-line stand from the Giants defense seals the team's first win.
    - Carolina Panthers 27, Atlanta Falcons 20
      - Joey Harrington tallies 361 passing yards and two touchdowns for the Falcons, but Carolina wins thanks to a solid running game and three costly penalties against Falcons cornerback DeAngelo Hall.
    - Dallas Cowboys 34, Chicago Bears 10
      - The Cowboys, who go to 3–0 for the first time since 1999, blow open a tight game in the second half as Tony Romo finishes with 329 yards passing and two TDs.
- Basketball:
  - UAAP men's basketball first round at Quezon City.
    - Ateneo 69–64 UST
      - Ateneo advances to the semifinals.
- Cycling: 2007 Vuelta a España
  - Denis Menchov of Russia wins his second Vuelta a España by 3:31 over Spain's Carlos Sastre. Another Spaniard, Samuel Sánchez, takes the final spot on the podium.
- Football (soccer):
  - 2007 FIFA Women's World Cup Quarterfinals in China
    - Norway 1–0 China, Wuhan
    - Brazil 3–2 Australia, Tianjin
- Rugby league: NRL Preliminary Final
  - Melbourne Storm 26–10 Parramatta Eels at Telstra Dome
- Rugby union: 2007 Rugby World Cup in France
  - Pool B: Australia 55–12 Fiji at Montpellier
  - Pool C: Scotland 0–40 New Zealand at Edinburgh, Scotland

== 22 September 2007 (Saturday) ==
- Baseball:
  - The Boston Red Sox beat the Tampa Bay Devil Rays 8–6 and become the first team to clinch a spot in the playoffs.
- American football:
  - NCAA Division I FBS AP Top 25:
    - (1) USC 47, Washington State 14
    - (2) LSU 28, (12) South Carolina 16
      - The Tigers outgain the Gamecocks on the ground, 287 yards to 16, in a downpour in Baton Rouge. Kicker Colt David scores on a fake field goal pass from Matt Flynn.
    - (3) Florida 30, Mississippi 24
      - Tim Tebow runs for 168 yards and two touchdowns and throws for two more in an otherwise uninspiring performance by the defending champs.
    - (5) West Virginia 48, East Carolina 7
    - (6) California 45, Arizona 27
    - (7) Texas 58, Rice 14
    - (8) Ohio State 58, Northwestern 7
    - (9) Wisconsin 17, Iowa 13
    - Michigan 14, (10) Penn State 9
      - Mike Hart carries the ball 44 times for 153 yards as Michigan beats Penn State for the ninth straight time.
    - (13) Oregon 55, Stanford 31
    - (14) Boston College 37, Army 17
    - (15) Clemson 42, NC State 20
    - (22) Georgia 26, (16) Alabama 23 (OT)
      - After a made field goal from Alabama's Leigh Tiffin, Matthew Stafford throws a touchdown pass on the Dawgs' first play in overtime to give Nick Saban his first home loss with the Tide.
    - (17) Virginia Tech 44, William & Mary 3
    - Syracuse 38, (18) Louisville 35
      - Orange quarterback Andrew Robinson throws for 428 yards and four touchdowns in a massive upset. His counterpart, Brian Brohm, racks up 555 passing yards in a losing effort.
    - (19) Hawaiʻi 66, Charleston Southern 10
    - (21) Kentucky 42, Arkansas 29
      - The Wildcats score 21 unanswered points in the fourth quarter to win their SEC road opener for the first time since 1984. Wildcats quarterback Andre' Woodson breaks Trent Dilfer's major-college record for most consecutive pass attempts without an interception, with his total now standing at 296.
    - (23) South Florida 37, North Carolina 10
    - (24) Nebraska 41, Ball State 40
      - The Huskers survive a late scare, which included a dropped pass in the open field and a 55-yard field goal that went wide left as time expired, to beat a plucky Cardinals side.
    - (25) Missouri 38, Illinois State 17
  - Other notable games:
    - Michigan State 31, Notre Dame 14 — The Fighting Irish go to 0–4 for the first time in school history, and "Sparty" wins its 6th successive game at Notre Dame Stadium.
    - Wofford 42, Appalachian State 31 — The 17-game winning streak of the Division I FCS top-ranked Mountaineers, the longest in NCAA Division I, ends.
- Basketball:
  - UAAP basketball Finals at Manila.
    - Juniors: La Salle 76–74 Ateneo , La Salle leads series, 1–0
    - Women: La Salle 64–60 UP , Ateneo leads series, 1–0
- Football (soccer):
  - 2007 FIFA Women's World Cup Quarterfinals in China
    - Germany 3–0 North Korea, Wuhan
    - United States 3–0 England, Tianjin
- Rugby league:
  - NRL Preliminary Final
    - Manly-Warringah Sea Eagles 28–6 North Queensland Cowboys at Sydney Football Stadium
  - Super League Play-Offs
    - Hull F.C. 22–16 Huddersfield Giants at KC Stadium
- Rugby union: 2007 Rugby World Cup in France
  - Pool A: South Africa 30–25 Tonga at Lens
  - Pool A: England 44–22 Samoa at Nantes
  - Pool D: Argentina 63–3 Namibia at Marseille
- Cricket
  - 2007 Twenty20 World Championship
    - Semifinals
      - Pakistan 147/4 (18.5 ov.) beat New Zealand 143/8 (20 ov.) by 6 wickets
      - India 188/5 (20 ov.) beat Australia 173/7 (20 ov.)

== 21 September 2007 (Friday) ==
- American football:
  - NCAA Division I FBS AP Top 25:
    - (4) Oklahoma 62, Tulsa 21
- Major League Baseball:
  - Houston Astros 6, St. Louis Cardinals 3
    - The Houston Astros eliminate the defending World Series champion Cardinals from playoff contention, and assures Major League Baseball of a new world champion for the seventh year in a row (the 2000 New York Yankees remain the last team to repeat as World Series champions).
- Rugby league: Super League Play-Offs
  - Bradford Bulls 30–31 Wigan Warriors at Grattan Stadium, Odsal
    - Wigan, who only qualified for the play-offs in the last weekend of the season after a surprise win against minor premiers St. Helens, come back from a 30–6 deficit in the last 20 minutes and eliminate Bradford. (Super League)
- Rugby union: 2007 Rugby World Cup in France
  - Pool D: France 25–3 Ireland at Saint-Denis
    - Two late tries to Vincent Clerc helps France comfortably defeat Ireland 25–3 in front of 80,000 spectators in the Stade de France and avoid being knocked out of the tournament. BBC Sport

== 20 September 2007 (Thursday) ==
- American football:
  - NCAA Division I FBS AP Top 25:
    - Miami (FL) 34, (20) Texas A&M 17
- Cycling:
  - Floyd Landis is officially stripped of his win in the 2006 Tour de France and banned from competition for two years after an arbitration panel finds him guilty of doping during the 2006 Tour. He has 30 days to appeal to the Court of Arbitration for Sport. (AP via ESPN.com)
- Football (soccer):
  - José Mourinho resigns as manager of Chelsea "by mutual consent" after a breakdown in his relations with the club hierarchy. The club and Mourinho agree to a £20 million buyout of the remaining three years of his contract. (ESPNSoccernet)
  - 2007 FIFA Women's World Cup in China
    - Group C: Canada 2–2 Australia, Chengdu
    - Group C: Ghana 2–7 Norway, Hangzhou
    - Group D: New Zealand 0–2 China, Tianjin
    - Group D: Denmark 0–1 Brazil, Hangzhou
      - Norway and Australia advance to the knockout rounds from Group C, while Brazil and China advance from Group D.
- Rugby union: 2007 Rugby World Cup in France
  - Pool B: Wales 72 – 18 Japan at Cardiff, Wales
- Cricket
  - 2007 Twenty20 World Championship
    - Super Eights
      - Group E
        - India 153/5 (20 ov.) beat South Africa 116/9 (20 ov.) by 37 runs
          - India and New Zealand go on to the semifinals while South Africa and England are knocked out
      - Group F
        - Australia 102/0 (10.2 ov.) beat Sri Lanka 101 (19.3 ov.) by 10 wickets
        - Pakistan 141/6 (19 ov.) beat Bangladesh 140 (19.4 ov.) by 4 wickets
          - Pakistan and Australia go on to the semifinals while Sri Lanka and Bangladesh are knocked out

== 19 September 2007 (Wednesday) ==
- Basketball:
  - Philippine NCAA basketball tournament 2007 Finals at the Araneta Coliseum
    - Juniors: (1) San Sebastian 90–72 Letran (2), San Sebastian leads series, 1–0
    - Seniors: (1) San Beda 76–68 Letran (2), San Beda leads series, 1–0
- Cricket
  - 2007 Twenty20 World Championship
    - Super Eights
      - Group E
        - South Africa 158/4 (19.1 ov.) beat New Zealand 153/8 (20 ov.) by 6 wickets
        - India 218/4 (20 ov.) beat England 200/6 (20 ov.) by 18 runs
          - Yuvraj Singh hits six sixes off a Stuart Broad over.
- Rugby union: 2007 Rugby World Cup in France
  - Pool C: Italy 31–5 Portugal at Paris

== 18 September 2007 (Tuesday) ==
- Football (soccer):
  - 2007 FIFA Women's World Cup in China
    - Group B: North Korea 1–2 Sweden, Tianjin
    - Group B: Nigeria 0–1 United States, Shanghai
      - The USA and Korea DPR advance to the quarterfinals.
  - 2007–08 UEFA Champions League group stage first matches in groups A, B, C and D
    - Group A: Marseille 2–0 Beşiktaş
    - Group A: Porto 1–1 Liverpool
    - Group B: Chelsea 1–1 Rosenborg
    - Group B: Schalke 04 0–1 Valencia
    - Group C: Real Madrid 2–1 Werder Bremen
    - Group C: Olympiacos 1–1 Lazio
    - Group D: Milan 2–1 Benfica
    - Group D: Shakhtar Donetsk 2–0 Celtic
- Rugby union: 2007 Rugby World Cup in France
  - Pool C: Scotland 42–0 Romania at Edinburgh, Scotland
- Cricket
  - 2007 Twenty20 World Championship
    - Super Eights
      - Group E
        - New Zealand 164/9 (20 ov.) beat England 159/8 (20 ov.) by 5 runs
      - Group F
        - Pakistan 165/4 (19.1 ov.) beat Australia 164/7 (20 ov.) by 6 wickets
        - Sri Lanka 147/5 (20 ov.) beat Bangladesh 83 (15.5 ov.) by 64 runs

== 17 September 2007 (Monday) ==
- American football:
  - College football polls:
    - USC and LSU remain 1–2 in both the AP and Coaches polls. Florida, third in last week's Coaches Poll, rises to third in the AP Poll after its 59–20 thrashing of Tennessee. Other highlights:
    - Alabama enters both polls for the first time since 2005.
    - Kentucky enters the polls for the first time since 1984 after defeating Louisville.
    - South Florida is ranked for the first time in school history.
  - National Football League Week 2:
    - Washington Redskins 20, Philadelphia Eagles 12
      - Redskins safety LaRon Landry seals the win by knocking the ball out of Kevin Curtis' hands on a late fourth down deep in Washington territory.
- Baseball:
  - Frank Thomas hits three home runs in a game for the second time in his career in the Toronto Blue Jays' 6–1 win over the Boston Red Sox. That and the New York Yankees' 8–5 win against Baltimore shrink the Sox's lead in the AL East to 3 1/2 games.
- Basketball:
  - UAAP men's basketball tournament 2007 knockout game at the Araneta Coliseum.
    - UST 80–69 FEU
      - The University of Santo Tomas clinch the last bus to the playoffs as Far Eastern University is eliminated from contention.
- Football (soccer):
  - 2007 FIFA Women's World Cup in China (all times local, UTC+8)
    - Group A: Argentina 1–6 England, Chengdu
    - Group A: Japan 0–2 Germany, Hangzhou
  - England and Germany advance to the knockout rounds.

== 16 September 2007 (Sunday) ==
- Auto racing:
  - Formula One: Belgian Grand Prix at Spa, Belgium:
  (1) Kimi Räikkönen (Finland) (2) Felipe Massa (Brazil) (3) Fernando Alonso (Spain)
  - NASCAR Chase for the NEXTEL Cup: Sylvania 300 in Loudon, New Hampshire.
  (1) Clint Bowyer (United States) (2) Jeff Gordon (United States) (3) Tony Stewart (United States)
- American football:
  - National Football League Week 2:
    - Pittsburgh Steelers 26, Buffalo Bills 3
      - The Steelers hold Buffalo to 121 passing yards — and only 9 in the first half — and nine first downs.
    - Houston Texans 34, Carolina Panthers 21
      - The Texans score two touchdowns in 8 seconds of the third quarter; Houston is now 2–0 for the first time in team history.
    - Jacksonville Jaguars 13, Atlanta Falcons 7
      - David Garrard leads two fourth-quarter scoring drives; the Falcons give up seven sacks and miss two field goals.
    - Tampa Bay Buccaneers 31, New Orleans Saints 14
      - Tampa Bay goes up 28–0 on two touchdowns each by Joey Galloway and Carnell Williams, then cruises to a victory. New Orleans falls to 0–2.
    - Green Bay Packers 35, New York Giants 13
      - Brett Favre throws three touchdown passes — two in the fourth quarter — to set an NFL record with his 149th career win.
    - San Francisco 49ers 17, St. Louis Rams 16
      - Dante Hall's muff of a punt in the fourth quarter gives Joe Nedney the chance to kick what turns out to be the game-winning field goal.
    - Cleveland Browns 51, Cincinnati Bengals 45.
      - In his first game as the Browns' regular quarterback, Derek Anderson throws for five touchdowns, while Jamal Lewis rushes for 215 yards in the shootout. Carson Palmer racks up 401 yards and six scores in a losing effort.
    - Indianapolis Colts 22, Tennessee Titans 20
      - Vince Young nearly rallies the Titans back from a 22–13 deficit, but the Colts defense tightens just in time to end Tennessee's would-be game-winning drive in the last minute.
    - Detroit Lions 20, Minnesota Vikings 17, OT
      - An injured Jon Kitna gutsily leads the Lions to Jason Hanson's game-winning field goal after a Minnesota fumble.
    - Dallas Cowboys 37, Miami Dolphins 20
      - The Cowboys intercept Dolphins quarterback Trent Green four times.
    - Arizona Cardinals 23, Seattle Seahawks 20
      - A late Matt Hasselbeck fumble sets up Neil Rackers' game-winning 41-yard field goal.
    - Baltimore Ravens 20, New York Jets 13
      - Ray Lewis picks off a Kellen Clemens pass in the end zone to end the Jets' comeback bid.
    - Denver Broncos 23, Oakland Raiders 20, OT
      - What appears to be Sebastian Janikowski's game-winning field goal is waved off when officials rule the Broncos had called time-out before the snap. Janikowski's second attempt strikes the upright, while Jason Elam is true on a 23-yarder shortly thereafter.
    - Chicago Bears 20, Kansas City Chiefs 10
      - Two big Devin Hester punt returns pace the Bears to a 17–0 lead they don't give up.
    - New England Patriots 38, San Diego Chargers 14
      - The Pats put last week's spying controversy behind them, with Tom Brady completing 25 of his 31 passes for three TDs, two of them to Randy Moss.
- Baseball:
  - Jim Thome of the Chicago White Sox becomes the 23rd Major League Baseball player to hit his 500th career home run, hitting a two-run walk-off shot off Dustin Moseley to give the Chisox a 9–7 win over the Los Angeles Angels in Chicago. Thome is the third player this season to reach 500 homers, a first in MLB history, and he is also the first to reach 500 homers with a walk-off homer. (AP via ESPN)
- Basketball:
  - EuroBasket 2007 in Spain
    - Championship: Russia 60–59 Spain
      - J. R. Holden, after stripping Pau Gasol of the ball, scores the winning shot with 2 seconds left. Fellow Russian Andrei Kirilenko is tournament MVP.
    - Third place: Lithuania 78–69 Greece
    - Fifth place: Germany 80–71 Croatia
    - Seventh place: Slovenia 88–74 France
    - Russia receives a direct berth in the 2008 Olympics. Since Spain already qualified for Beijing by winning the 2006 FIBA World Championship, Lithuania also books a place in Beijing. Greece, Germany, Croatia, and Slovenia advance to the pre-Olympic qualifying tournament.
- Golf:
  - PGA Tour: Tiger Woods runs away with THE TOUR Championship in Atlanta, finishing at 257 (23 under par) and winning by 8 shots over Mark Calcavecchia and Zach Johnson. Woods wins $1.26 million for winning the tournament, and earns a $10 million retirement annuity as the inaugural winner of the FedEx Cup as PGA Tour season champion.
  - LPGA and Ladies European Tour: Team United States wins the Solheim Cup 16–12 over Team Europe in Sweden, going 8–3–1 on the final day of singles matches and winning the Cup for only the second time ever in Europe. This came a day after television commentator Dottie Pepper called Team USA "chokin' freakin' dogs" in a comment that accidentally went over the air.
  - Amateur men's golf: Team USA wins the Walker Cup 12 1/2–11 1/2 over Team Great Britain and Ireland in Northern Ireland. This is Team USA's first win in this event on the other side of the Atlantic since 1991.
- Rugby union: 2007 Rugby World Cup in France
  - Pool A: Samoa 15–19 Tonga at Montpellier
  - Pool B: Fiji 29–16 Canada at Cardiff, Wales
  - Pool D: France 87–10 Namibia at Toulouse

== 15 September 2007 (Saturday) ==
- American football:
  - NCAA Division I FBS AP Top 25:
    - (1) USC 49, (14) Nebraska 31
    - (2) LSU 44, Middle Tennessee 0
    - (3) Oklahoma 54, Utah State 3
    - (5) Florida 59, (22) Tennessee 20
      - Tim Tebow throws for two touchdowns and rushes for two more.
    - (6) Texas 35, Central Florida 32
      - The Knights open the new Bright House Networks Stadium by throwing a scare into the Longhorns, but Texas wins on a 46-yard Jamaal Charles touchdown.
    - (7) Wisconsin 45, The Citadel 31
      - P. J. Hill's four touchdowns prevent the Badgers from falling, like Michigan two weeks ago, to a lower-division team.
    - (8) California 42, Louisiana Tech 12
    - Kentucky 40, (9) Louisville 34
      - Andre' Woodson throws for four TD passes, including the game-winner with 28 seconds remaining, to give the Wildcats their first win over a top-10 team since 1977.
    - (10) Ohio State 33, Washington 14
    - Utah 44, (11) UCLA 6
      - Utes quarterback Tommy Grady throws four touchdowns in the Utes' embarrassment of the Bruins.
    - (12) Penn State 45, Buffalo 24
    - (13) Rutgers 59, Norfolk State 0
    - (21) Boston College 24, (15) Georgia Tech 10
    - Alabama 41, (16) Arkansas 38
    - (17) South Carolina 38, South Carolina State 3
    - (18) Virginia Tech 28, Ohio 7
    - (19) Oregon 52, Fresno State 21
    - (20) Clemson 38, Furman 10
    - (23) Georgia 45, Western Carolina 16
    - (24) Hawaiʻi 49, UNLV 14
    - (25) Texas A&M 54, Louisiana-Monroe 14
  - Other games:
    - Michigan 38, Notre Dame 0
- Basketball:
  - EuroBasket 2007 in Spain
    - Semifinals
      - Spain 82–77 Greece
      - Russia 86–74 Lithuania
        - Russia book their place in the 2008 Olympics. With Spain already qualified for Beijing as reigning world champions, the winner of the third-place match tomorrow between Greece and Lithuania will also book a place in Beijing, with the loser going to the pre-Olympic qualifying tournament.
    - Classification round
      - Croatia 86–69 France
      - Germany 69–65 Slovenia
        - Croatia and Germany also book places in the pre-Olympic qualifying tournament. They will be joined by the winner of the seventh-place match tomorrow between France and Slovenia.
- Figure skating:
  - 2007 Junior Grand Prix Vienna Cup
    - Ice Dancing:
      Gold: (United States) Emily Samuelson / Evan Bates
      Silver: (Russia) Maria Monko / Ilia Tkachenko
      Bronze: (Italy) Isabella Pajardi / Stefano Caruso
      Samuelson and Bates have earned a spot to the Junior Grand Prix Final. They are the first to do so.
    - Men's singles:
      Gold: (United States) Brandon Mroz
      Silver: (China) Guan Jinlin
      Bronze: (Russia) Artem Borodulin
- Football (soccer):
  - 2007 FIFA Women's World Cup in China (all times local, UTC+8)
    - Group C: Canada 4–0 Ghana, Hangzhou
    - Group D: Denmark 2–0 New Zealand, Wuhan
    - Group C: Norway 1–1 Australia, Hangzhou
    - Group D: China 0–4 Brazil, Wuhan
- Rugby union: 2007 Rugby World Cup in France
  - Pool B: Wales 20–32 Australia at Cardiff, Wales
  - Pool C: New Zealand 108–13 Portugal at Lyon
  - Pool D: Ireland 14–10 Georgia at Bordeaux
    - Ireland narrowly avoid a sensational defeat by Georgia, a country with only eight rugby pitches and fewer than 300 registered players, trailing by 10 points to 7 at one stage.

== 14 September 2007 (Friday) ==
- Basketball:
  - EuroBasket 2007 in Spain — quarterfinals
    - Croatia 72–74 Lithuania
    - Greece 63–62 Slovenia
- Figure skating:
  - 2007 Junior Grand Prix Vienna Cup
    - Ladies singles:
      Gold: (United States) Rachael Flatt
      Silver: (United States) Kristine Musademba
      Bronze: (Finland) Jenni Vähämaa
- Football (soccer):
  - 2007 FIFA Women's World Cup in China
    - Group A: Argentina 0–1 Japan at Shanghai
    - Group B: United States 2–0 Sweden at Chengdu
    - Group A: Germany 0–0 England, Shanghai
    - Group B: North Korea 2–0 Nigeria, Chengdu
- Rugby union: 2007 Rugby World Cup in France
  - Pool A: England 0–36 South Africa at Saint-Denis
- Cricket
  - 2007 Twenty20 World Championship
    - Group B
      - Australia 136/2 (14.5 ov.) beat England 135 (20 ov.) by 8 wickets
        - Zimbabwe is knocked out of the tournament
    - Group C
      - Sri Lanka 260/6 (20 ov.) beat Kenya 88 (19.3 ov.) by 172 runs
        - This is the biggest margin of victory (runs) in a Twenty20 International
        - Sri Lanka also scored the highest innings total in a Twenty20 International
        - Kenya is knocked out of the tournament
    - Group D
      - India 141/9 (20 ov.) tie Pakistan 141/7 (20 ov.). India wins the bowl out 3–0.
        - Scotland is knocked out of the tournament.

== 13 September 2007 (Thursday) ==
- American football:
  - NCAA Division I FBS AP Top 25:
    - (4) West Virginia 31, Maryland 14
  - National Football League
    - The New England Patriots, confirmed to have spied on the New York Jets' signals with a secret video camera in their season opener, have been fined $250,000 as a team, with their coach, Bill Belichick, being fined $500,000. Also, if they make the playoffs this year, they forfeit their first-round draft pick, but if they miss the playoffs, they forfeit their second- and third-round picks.
- Basketball:
  - EuroBasket 2007 in Spain — quarterfinals
    - Russia 75–71 France
    - Spain 83–55 Germany
  - UAAP men's basketball tournament 2007 elimination round at the Araneta Coliseum.
    - FEU 74–64 UST
      - Far Eastern University avoids elimination as they force the defending champions University of Santo Tomas in a do-or-die affair to determine which team will advance to the playoffs.
    - UE 92–84 La Salle (OT)
      - The University of the East clinches the first finals berth as they sweep the elimination round, the first time a team was able to do so since 1993, by beating De La Salle University-Manila in a mostly tightly fought contest.
- Cricket:
  - 2007 Twenty20 World Championship
    - Group A
      - Bangladesh 165/4 (18 ov.) beat West Indies 164/8 (20 ov.) by 6 wickets
        - West Indies are eliminated from the tournament. Bangladesh and South Africa go on to the super eights
    - Group B
      - England 188/9 (20 ov.) beat Zimbabwe 138/7 (20 ov.) by 50 runs
    - Group D
      - Match between India and Scotland is abandoned
        - Pakistan go on to the super eights.
- Formula One:
  - Formula One team McLaren have been excluded from the 2007 Formula One Constructors Championship and are to pay a fine of $100 million dollars as part of the 2007 Formula One espionage controversy.

== 12 September 2007 (Wednesday) ==
- Basketball:
  - EuroBasket 2007 in Spain — qualifying phase; teams advancing to the quarterfinals are in **bold**
    - Group F: **Germany** 67–58 Italy
    - Group F: **France** 85–64 Turkey
    - Group F: **Lithuania** 80–61 **Slovenia**
  - Philippine NCAA basketball tournament 2007 semifinals at the Araneta Coliseum; teams advancing to the Finals in bold.
    - Juniors: **(1) San Sebastian** 85–74 JRU (4)
    - Juniors: (3) San Beda 96–86 Letran (2)
    - Seniors: **(2) Letran** 70–61 JRU (3)
    - Seniors: **(1) San Beda** 74–64 Mapua (4)
- Football (soccer)
  - 2008 UEFA European Football Championship qualifying
    - Group A: Finland 0–0 Poland
    - Group A: Kazakhstan 2–2 Belgium
    - Group A: Portugal 1–1 Serbia
    - Group B: Lithuania 2–1 Faroe Islands
    - Group B: France 0–1 Scotland
    - Group B: Ukraine 1–2 Italy
    - Group C: Norway 2–2 Greece
    - Group C: Bosnia and Herzegovina 0–1 Moldova
    - Group C: Turkey 3–0 Hungary
    - Group D: Slovakia 2–5 Wales
    - Group D: Cyprus 3–0 San Marino
    - Group D: Czech Republic 1–0 Republic of Ireland
    - Group E: Andorra 0–6 Croatia
    - Group E: England 3–0 Russia
    - Group E: North Macedonia 1–1 Estonia
    - Group F: Iceland 2–1 Northern Ireland
    - Group F: Denmark 4–0 Liechtenstein
    - Group F: Spain 2–0 Latvia
    - Group G: Slovenia 1–0 Belarus
    - Group G: Bulgaria 3–0 Luxembourg
    - Group G: Albania 0–1 Netherlands
    The match ends before all the designated injury time is played when a hooligan throws a rudimentary flash grenade that injured Ryan Babel after the lone goal was scored by Ruud van Nistelrooy.
  - 2007 FIFA Women's World Cup in China (all times local, UTC+8)
    - Group C: Australia 4–1 Ghana, Hangzhou
    - Group D: Brazil 5–0 New Zealand, Wuhan
    - Group C: Norway 2–1 Canada, Hangzhou
    - Group D: China 3–2 Denmark, Wuhan
- Cricket:
  - 2007 Twenty20 World Championship
    - Group B
      - Zimbabwe 139/5 (19.5 ov.) beat Australia 138/9 (20 ov.) by 5 wickets
    - Group C
      - New Zealand 74/1 (7.4 ov.) beat Kenya 73 (16.5 ov.) by 9 wickets
        - Kenya's total of 73 is the lowest total ever in a Twenty20 International
    - Group D
      - Pakistan 171/9 (20 ov.) beat Scotland 120 (19.5 ov.)
- Rugby union: 2007 Rugby World Cup in France
  - Pool A: United States 15–25 Tonga at Montpellier
  - Pool B: Japan 31–35 Fiji at Toulouse
  - Pool C: Italy 24–18 Romania at Marseille

== 11 September 2007 (Tuesday) ==
- American football:
  - Doctors say injured Buffalo Bills tight end Kevin Everett has moved his arms and legs and, contrary to earlier predictions, is likely to recover his ability to walk. (AP via WHAM-TV)
  - The Cleveland Browns trade starting quarterback Charlie Frye to the Seattle Seahawks for a sixth-round draft pick and re-sign QB Ken Dorsey. Rookie QB Brady Quinn moves up to second on the depth chart behind Derek Anderson (Clevelandbrowns.com).
- Basketball:
  - EuroBasket 2007 in Spain – qualifying phase; teams advancing to the quarterfinals are in **bold**
    - Group E: **Russia** 83–70 **Croatia**
    - Group E: **Greece** 85–67 Portugal
    - Group E: **Spain** 99–73 Israel
- Football (soccer): 2007 FIFA Women's World Cup in China
  - Group B: United States 2–2 North Korea, Chengdu
    - Heather O'Reilly scores in the 69th minute to tie the game for the US, who needed a critical save by Hope Solo in extra time to preserve the point against North Korea.
  - Group A: England 2–2 Japan, Shanghai
    - Aya Miyama scores both goals for her team on free kicks, one in the final minute of extra time to steal a point for Japan. Kelly Smith scores both goals for England in the final ten minutes of regulation play.
  - Group B: Sweden 1–1 Nigeria, Chengdu
    - Cynthia Uwak scores the equalizer in the 82nd minute and earns the underdog Nigeria a critical point in Group B, considered by most to be the Cup's Group of Death.
- Rugby union: 2007 Rugby World Cup in France
  - Pool D: Argentina 33–3 Georgia at Lyon
- Cricket
  - 2007 Twenty20 World Championship
    - Group A
      - South Africa 208/2 (17.4 ov.) beat West Indies 205/6 (20 ov.) by 8 wickets
        - Chris Gayle becomes the first person to score a century in an official International Twenty20.
- Swimming:
  - Tunisian swimmer **Oussama Mellouli** was stripped of his 2007 world championship title for **doping** by the Court of Arbitration for Sport in Lausanne, Switzerland. He was also given an 18-month suspension, made retroactive to 30 November 2006. This means, that while he loses two worlds championship medals from **2007 World Aquatics Championships** held in Melbourne in March 2007, he will be eligible to compete at the 2008 Summer Olympics in Beijing.
    With his 2007 results vacated, he loses the historic distinction of having become the first Arab competitor to win a world swimming championship (800 m freestyle). Przemysław Stańczyk (pl:Przemysław Stańczyk) of Poland takes over as reigning world champion. The other affected Melbourne result is 400 m freestyle. In sum, two Australians move up from bronze to silver, and an Italian and a Russian gain bronze medals instead of 4. places.

== 10 September 2007 (Monday) ==
- American football – National Football League:
  - The NFL is investigating an accusation that the New England Patriots violated league rules by bringing video camera equipment to the New York Jets sideline in order to steal signs from them during their Week 1 game.
  - Buffalo Bills tight end Kevin Everett is recovering after emergency surgery to stabilize the neck injury he sustained in the Bills' Week 1 loss to the Denver Broncos. Doctors stated that his spinal cord, injured between the third and fourth cervical vertebrae, was not severed, but that his chance of a full recovery are slim. Everett was conscious and alert following his injury up until entering surgery, and is aware of his situation. They will know more about his long-term prognosis in another 2–3 days.
  - NFL Week 1 (Monday Night Football):
    - Cincinnati Bengals 27, Baltimore Ravens 20
    The Ravens commit six turnovers, including an end-zone interception with 1:13 left.
    - San Francisco 49ers 20, Arizona Cardinals 17
    49ers quarterback Alex Smith leads an improbable 87-yard touchdown drive during the final three minutes to win the game.
- Basketball:
  - EuroBasket 2007 in Spain – qualifying phase; teams that have secured a quarterfinal berth are in **bold**
    - Group F: Italy 84–75 Turkey (OT)
    - Group F: **Lithuania** 88–73 **France**
    - Group F: **Slovenia** 77–47 Germany
- Football (soccer):
  - 2007 FIFA Women's World Cup in China
    - Group A: Germany 11–0 Argentina in Shanghai
      - The competition opens with the most one-sided match in the history of the competition, with Birgit Prinz and Sandra Smisek both scoring hat tricks for the defending champions.

== 9 September 2007 (Sunday) ==
- Tennis:
  - 2007 U.S. Open - Men's Singles
    - (Switzerland) Roger Federer d. (Serbia) Novak Djokovic, 7–6 ^{(7–4)}, 7–6 ^{(7–2)}, 6–4
- American football:
  - National Football League Week 1:
    - Washington Redskins 16, Miami Dolphins 13 (OT)
    The Redskins' running tandem of Clinton Portis and Ladell Betts wear down the Dolphins; Washington wins the overtime coin toss and drives to the winning Shaun Suisham field goal.
    - Carolina Panthers 27, St. Louis Rams 13
    The Rams lead at halftime, but two costly Steven Jackson fumbles shift the momentum to Carolina for good.
    - New England Patriots 38, New York Jets 14
    In his first game as a Patriot, Randy Moss catches nine passes for 183 yards and a touchdown.
    - Pittsburgh Steelers 34, Cleveland Browns 7
    Ben Roethlisberger throws four touchdown passes; the Browns give up six sacks in the first half.
    - Green Bay Packers 16, Philadelphia Eagles 13
    Two muffed punts by the Eagles lead to 10 Green Bay points, including the game-winning 42-yard field goal by rookie Mason Crosby.
    - Houston Texans 20, Kansas City Chiefs 3
    Mario Williams has two sacks and returns a fumble 38 yards for a touchdown.
    - Minnesota Vikings 24, Atlanta Falcons 3
    The Vikings return two Joey Harrington passes for touchdowns in the fourth quarter.
    - Tennessee Titans 13 Jacksonville Jaguars 10
    The Titans rush for 272 yards, with Chris Brown picking up 175 of them.
    - Denver Broncos 15, Buffalo Bills 14
    With the clock about to expire, the Broncos manage to snap the ball for Jason Elam's 42-yard winning kick.
    Bills tight end Kevin Everett suffers a cervical spinal injury in a head-to-head collision with Broncos wide receiver Domenik Hixon, whom he was tackling on a kickoff return. He was evacuated from the field via ambulance, and underwent emergency surgery in an attempt to prevent quadriplegia.
    - Seattle Seahawks 20, Tampa Bay Buccaneers 6
    The Bucs take an early lead with two early field goals, but fail to score the rest of the game.
    - San Diego Chargers 14, Chicago Bears 3
    LaDainian Tomlinson rushes for a touchdown, and passes for the Chargers' other.
    - Detroit Lions 36, Oakland Raiders 21
    Kicking proves vital as Jason Hanson of the Lions makes three field goals while Sebastian Janikowski of the Raiders misses all three of his FG attempts.
    - Dallas Cowboys 45, New York Giants 35
      - Tony Romo throws for 345 yards and four touchdowns on 24 passes and runs for a fifth touchdown. Eli Manning also has a four-touchdown game but leaves due to injury, as do Giants running back Brandon Jacobs and defensive end Osi Umenyiora.
- Auto racing:
  - Formula One: Italian Grand Prix at Monza, Italy:
  (1) Fernando Alonso (Spain) (2) Lewis Hamilton (United Kingdom) (3) Felipe Massa (Brazil)
  - IRL: Peak Antifreeze Indy 300 in Joliet, Illinois.
  (1) Dario Franchitti (United Kingdom) (2) Scott Dixon (New Zealand) (3) Sam Hornish Jr. (United States)
  Franchitti wins both the race and the season championship.
- Basketball:
  - EuroBasket 2007 in Spain – qualifying phase; teams that have secured a quarterfinal berth are in **bold**
    - Group E: Portugal 94–85 Israel
    - Group E: Greece 81–78 Croatia
    - Group E: **Spain** 81–69 **Russia**
- Figure skating:
  - 2007 Junior Grand Prix Harghita Cup
    - Men's singles:
      Gold: (United States) Adam Rippon
      Silver: (Russia) Ivan Bariev
      Bronze: (Japan) Takahito Mura
    - Ice dancing:
      Gold: (Canada) Vanessa Crone / Paul Poirier
      Silver: (Russia) Ekaterina Riazanova / John Guerreiro
      Bronze: (Russia) Ksenia Monko / Kirill Khaliavin
- Rugby union: 2007 Rugby World Cup in France
  - Pool A: South Africa 59–7 Samoa at Parc des Princes, Paris
    - Bryan Habana scores four tries for the Springboks.
  - Pool B: Wales 42–17 Canada at Nantes
  - Pool C: Scotland 56–10 Portugal at Saint-Étienne
  - Pool D: Ireland 32–17 Namibia at Bordeaux
- Field hockey
  - 2007 Men's Hockey Asia Cup
    - India beats South Korea 7–2 to life Asia Cup Hockey.

== 8 September 2007 (Saturday) ==
- Tennis:
  - 2007 U.S. Open - Women's Singles
    - (Belgium) **Justine Henin** def. (Russia) Svetlana Kuznetsova 6–1 6–3
- American football:
  - NCAA Division I FBS AP Top 25:
    - (2) LSU 48, (9) Virginia Tech 7
    - (3) West Virginia 48, Marshall 23
    - (4) Florida 59, Troy 31
    - (5) Oklahoma 51, Miami (FL) 13
    - (5) Wisconsin 20, UNLV 13
    - (7) Texas 34, (19) TCU 13
    - (10) California 34, Colorado State 28
    - South Carolina 16, (11) Georgia 12
    - (12) Ohio State 20, Akron 2
    Ohio State leads only 3–2 at halftime but goes on to win with defense. The Zips get only three first downs and are forced to punt a school-record 14 times.
    - (13) UCLA 27, BYU 17
    - (14) Penn State 31, Notre Dame 10
    - (16) Nebraska 20, Wake Forest 17
    A late end-zone interception helps the Cornhuskers avoid a major upset.
    - South Florida 26, (17) Auburn 23 (OT)
    - (20) Hawaiʻi 45, Louisiana Tech 44 (OT)
    - (21) Georgia Tech 69, Samford 14
    - Washington 24, (22) Boise State 10
    The Huskies end the Broncos' 14-game winning streak, which had been the nation's longest.
    - (23) Texas A&M 47, Fresno State 45 (3 OT)
    - (24) Tennessee 39, Southern Miss 19
    - (25) Clemson 49, UL-Monroe 26
  - Other games:
    - Oregon 39, Michigan 7
      - The Ducks provide the Wolverines their most-lopsided loss since 1968. Ducks quarterback Dennis Dixon throws for three touchdowns and runs for a fourth.
- Auto racing:
  - NASCAR: Chevy Rock & Roll 400 near Richmond, Virginia.
  (1) Jimmie Johnson (2) Tony Stewart (3) David Ragan
  Johnson wins his sixth race of the season, and his second in a row. Kevin Harvick and Clint Bowyer clinch the last two spots in the Chase for the NEXTEL Cup.
- Basketball:
  - EuroBasket 2007 in Spain – qualifying phase; teams securing a quarterfinal berth are in **bold**
    - Group F: France 78–66 Germany
    - Group F: **Lithuania** 79–74 Italy
    - Group F: **Slovenia** 66–51 Turkey
- Figure skating:
  - 2007 Junior Grand Prix Harghita Cup
    - Ladies singles:
      Gold: (United States) Chrissy Hughes
      Silver: (Russia) Alena Leonova
      Bronze: (Japan) Rumi Suizu
- Football (soccer) 2008 UEFA European Football Championship qualifying
  - Group A: Serbia 0–0 Finland
  - Group A: Portugal 2–2 Poland
  - Group B: Scotland 3–1 Lithuania
  - Group B: Georgia 1–1 Ukraine
  - Group B: Italy 0–0 France
  - Group C: Hungary 1–0 Bosnia and Herzegovina
  - Group C: Malta 2–2 Turkey
  - Group C: Moldova 0–1 Norway
  - Group D: Wales 0–2 Germany
  - Group D: San Marino 0–3 Czech Republic
  - Group D: Slovakia 2–2 Republic of Ireland
  - Group E: England 3–0 Israel
  - Group E: Russia 3–0 North Macedonia
  - Group E: Croatia 2–0 Estonia
  - Group F: Latvia 1–0 Northern Ireland
  - Group F: Iceland 1–1 Spain
  - Group F: Sweden 0–0 Denmark
  - Group G: Luxembourg 0–3 Slovenia
  - Group G: Belarus 1–3 Romania
  - Group G: Netherlands 2–0 Bulgaria
- Rugby union: 2007 Rugby World Cup in France
  - Pool A: England 28 – 10 United States at Lens
  - Pool B: Australia 91 – 3 Japan at Lyon
  - Pool C: New Zealand 76 – 14 Italy at Marseille
- Cricket:
  - Indian cricket team in England in 2007
    - England 188/3 (36.2 ov.) beat India 187 (47.3 ov.) by 7 wickets
    England win the 7-match series 4–3.
- 2007 Pacific Games in Apia, Samoa:
  - 20,000 people attend the closing ceremony.

== 7 September 2007 (Friday) ==
- American football:
  - NCAA Division I FBS AP Top 25:
    - (15) Rutgers 41, Navy 24
    Rutgers RB Ray Rice runs for two touchdowns and catches another en route to becoming the school's all-time leading rusher. The Scarlet Knights' defense also intercepts Navy QB Kaipo-Noa Kaheaku-Enhada three times.
- Basketball:
  - EuroBasket 2007 in Spain – qualifying phase; teams securing a quarterfinal berth are in **bold**
    - Group E: **Russia** 78–65 Portugal
    - Group E: Israel 80–75 Croatia
    - Group E: Spain 76–58 Greece
- Cricket:
  - Pakistan Cricket Board bans Shoaib Akhtar for an indefinite period for the alleged brawl with his teammate Mohammad Asif
- Rugby union: 2007 Rugby World Cup in France
  - Pool D: France 12–17 Argentina at Stade de France, Saint-Denis
  Los Pumas, who were opening the Rugby World Cup against the host nation for the third time in a row, take a 17–9 lead into the half and hold on to surprise Les Bleus.

== 6 September 2007 (Thursday) ==
- American football:
  - National Football League Kickoff Game:
    - Indianapolis Colts 41, New Orleans Saints 10:
    Colts receivers burn a former teammate, cornerback Jason David, for three touchdowns as Indianapolis begins its title defense.
  - NCAA Division I FBS AP Top 25:
    - (8) Louisville 58, Middle Tennessee 42
    Anthony Allen sets a Cardinals record with 275 rushing yards on 34 attempts and scores two touchdowns. (AP via Yahoo)

== 5 September 2007 (Wednesday) ==
- Baseball:
  - Playing as the designated hitter due to an ankle injury, New York Yankees slugger Alex Rodriguez hits two home runs in the seventh inning of the Yanks' 10–2 win over the Seattle Mariners. Rodriguez is the first Yankee to accomplish the feat since 1977. (AP via Yahoo)
- Basketball:
  - EuroBasket 2007 in Spain (teams qualifying for second group phase in **bold**)
    - Group A: **Israel** 87–83 Serbia
    - Group A: **Russia** 61–53 **Greece**
    - Group B: **Portugal** 77–67 Latvia
    - Group B: **Croatia** 85–84 **Spain**
    - Group C: **Lithuania** 84–80 **Germany**
    - Group C: **Turkey** 80–72 Czech Republic
    - Group D: **Slovenia** 67–66 **France**
    - Group D: **Italy** 79–70 Poland
- Cricket:
  - Indian cricket team in England in 2007
    - 6th ODI:India 317/8 (49.4 ov.) beat England 316/6 (50 ov.) by 2 wickets

== 4 September 2007 (Tuesday) ==
- American football: 2007 NCAA Division I FBS rankings
  - The top three positions in both the AP and Coaches Polls remain the same from last week, with USC and LSU 1–2 in both polls, West Virginia holding steady at #3 in the AP Poll, and Florida remaining #3 in the Coaches Poll.
  - After their shocking loss to Appalachian State, Michigan drops from #5 to completely out of the Top 25 in both polls. No team has had a greater drop out of the AP Poll in one week since the AP Poll was expanded to 25 teams in 1989. (AP via ESPN.com) (USA Today)
- Basketball:
  - EuroBasket 2007 in Spain
    - Group A: Russia 90–56 Israel
    - Group A: Greece 68–67 Serbia (OT)
    - Group B: Croatia 90–68 Portugal
    - Group B: Spain 93–77 Latvia
    - Group C: Lithuania 95–75 Czech Republic
    - Group C: Germany 79–49 Turkey
    - Group D: France 69–62 Italy
    - Group D: Slovenia 70–52 Poland
    - All of today's winners, except for Croatia, secure passage to the second group phase.

== 3 September 2007 (Monday) ==
- American football
  - NCAA Division I FBS AP Top 25:
    - Clemson 24, (19) Florida State 18
- Major League Baseball:
  - The New York Mets' Pedro Martínez becomes the 15th pitcher to reach 3000 career strikeouts, reaching the mark by striking out Cincinnati Reds pitcher Aaron Harang in the second inning of the Mets' 10–4 win in Cincinnati. In his first major-league appearance since rotator cuff surgery immediately after the 2006 season, Martínez goes five innings and picks up the win. (AP via ESPN.com)
- Basketball:
  - EuroBasket 2007 in Spain
    - Group A: Russia 73–65 Serbia
    - Group A: Greece 76–66 Israel
    - Group B: Latvia 85–77 Croatia
    - Group B: Spain 82–56 Portugal
    - Group C: Germany 83–78 Czech Republic (OT)
    - Group C: Lithuania 86–69 Turkey
    - Group D: France 74–66 Poland
    - Group D: Slovenia 69–68 Italy

== 2 September 2007 (Sunday) ==
- Auto racing:
  - NASCAR: Sharp Aquos 500 in Fontana, California.
  (1) Jimmie Johnson (2) Carl Edwards (3) Kyle Busch
  Johnson wins his fifth race of the season, and clinches a spot in the Chase for the NEXTEL Cup. Busch and Jeff Burton also clinch spots in the Chase.
  - Champ Car: Dutch Champ Car Grand Prix in Assen, Netherlands.
  (1) Justin Wilson (United Kingdom) (2) Jan Heylen (Belgium) (3) Bruno Junqueira (Brazil)
  - IRL: Detroit Indy Grand Prix in Sparta, Kentucky.
  (1) Tony Kanaan (Brazil) (2) Danica Patrick (United States) (3) Dan Wheldon (United Kingdom)
- Basketball:
  - FIBA Americas Championship 2007 at Las Vegas
    - Championship: United States 118–81 Argentina
    - Third place: Puerto Rico 111–107 Brazil
- Cricket:
  - Indian cricket team in England in 2007
    - 5th ODI: India 324/6 (50 ov.) beat England 242/8 (39 ov.) by 38 runs (D/L)
- Figure skating:
  - 2007 Junior Grand Prix Lake Placid
    - Ice dancing:
      Gold: (United States) Emily Samuelson / Evan Bates
      Silver: (Canada) Joanna Lenko / Mitchell Islam
      Bronze: (United States) Pilar Bosley / John Corona
    - Pairs:
      Gold: (Canada) Olivia Jones / Donald Jackson
      Silver: (Canada) Carolyn MacCuish / Andrew Evans
      Bronze: (Russia) Anastaisa Khodkova / Pavel Sliusarenko
    - Ladies singles:
      Gold: Mirai Nagasu
      Silver: Alexe Gilles
      Bronze: Angela Maxwell
      This is the third consecutive United States sweep of the Junior Ladies medals at an ISU-organized event.

== 1 September 2007 (Saturday) ==
- Figure skating:
  - 2007 Junior Grand Prix Lake Placid
    - Men's singles:
      Gold: (United States) Armin Mahbanoozadeh
      Silver: (United States) Austin Kanallakan
      Bronze: (Russia) Artem Grigoriev
- American football
  - NCAA Division I FBS Week One:
    - In one of the biggest upsets in college football history, the Football Championship Subdivision's Appalachian State Mountaineers defeat the Michigan Wolverines 34–32 at Michigan Stadium. Michigan, ranked fifth in the Football Bowl Subdivision, has a field goal blocked on the last play. The Mountaineers, who have won the past two FCS titles, become the first FCS (formerly Division I-AA) team to defeat a ranked FBS (formerly Division I-A) opponent since the creation of the subdivisions in 1978. (AP via ''Albany Times-Union'')
    - Fourth-ranked Texas is held to 21 points by the Sun Belt Conference's Arkansas State Indians. Longhorns quarterback Colt McCoy throws two interceptions in the 21–13 win.
    - Florida crushes Western Kentucky, 49–3, in the first game of the Gators' national title defense.
    - After a ceremony in memory of the victims of the Virginia Tech massacre, the ninth-ranked Hokies defeat East Carolina, 17–7, despite being held to 33 rushing yards.
    - Twelfth-ranked California beats No. 15 Tennessee, 45–31, and No. 18 Auburn tops Kansas State, 23–13
    - All other AP Top 25 teams playing Saturday blow out their opponents.
- Major League Baseball:
  - Starting pitcher Clay Buchholz, in his second career start, pitches a no-hitter, leading the Boston Red Sox to a 10–0 win over the Baltimore Orioles at Fenway Park. He is only the second pitcher to get a no-hitter within his first two career starts since 1900, after Wilson Álvarez in 1991. He threw nine strikeouts, and gave up three walks and hit one batter.
- Basketball:
  - FIBA Americas Championship 2007 semifinals at Las Vegas
    - Argentina 91–80 Brazil
    - United States 135–91 Puerto Rico
    - Argentina and the United States advance to the finals, therefore qualifying for the 2008 Summer Olympics in Beijing.
    - Brazil and Puerto Rico are eliminated from contention. However, as teams that exited in the semifinal round, Brazil and Puerto Rico join fifth-place finisher Canada in qualifying for the pre-Olympic qualifying tournament.
