= 2008 Camping World RV 400 presented by Coleman =

2008 Camping World RV 400
Race details
- Race 29 of 36 in the 2008 NASCAR Sprint Cup Series season
- 2008 Camping World RV presented by Coleman program cover
- Date: September 28, 2008
- Official name: Camping World RV 400
- Location: Kansas Speedway, Kansas City, Kansas
- Course: Permanent racing facility
- Course length: 2.414 km (1.5 miles)
- Distance: 267 laps, 400.5 mi (644.542 km)
- Weather: Temperatures reaching a high of 86 °F (30 °C); wind speeds up to 8 miles per hour (13 km/h)
- Average speed: 133.549 miles per hour (214.926 km/h)

Pole position
Driver	Jimmie Johnson	Hendrick Motorsports

Most laps led
Driver	Jimmie Johnson	Hendrick Motorsports
- Laps: 124

Winner
No. 48	Jimmie Johnson	Hendrick Motorsports

Television in the United States
- Network: ABC
- Announcers: Jerry Punch, Andy Petree and Rusty Wallace

The 2008 Camping World RV 400 presented by Coleman, was the twenty-ninth race of the 2008 NASCAR Sprint Cup season and also served as the third race in the 2008 Chase for the Sprint Cup. Jimmie Johnson of Hendrick Motorsports won the race.

== Summary ==
The 400.5 miles (644.5 km) race, not to be confused with the Camping World RV 400 at Dover, Delaware, was held on September 28 at the 1.5 miles (2.4 km) Kansas Speedway in Kansas City, Kansas. ABC carried the race beginning at 1 pm US EDT and MRN along with Sirius Satellite Radio had radio coverage starting at 1:15 pm US EDT.

=== Pre-Race News ===
- The big story came a week earlier, as the speedway, owned by International Speedway Corporation has won a coveted casino license. Plans are to bring the Hard Rock Hotel and Casino, a rock-and-roll themed casino overlooking Turn Two to be built on the property, and also add a second race to a future NASCAR Sprint Cup season no later than 2011 by taking one of the dates from one of the ISC-owned tracks.
- In a somewhat unexpected surprising move, A. J. Allmendinger is out of the Team Red Bull #84 Toyota after the season, and it is expected that Scott Speed will replace him.
- NASCAR will honor the legacy of actor and former Sprint Cup Series co-owner Paul Newman this weekend with a moment of silence during the pre-race ceremonies. Newman co-owned what is now the #12 car in the 1990s before selling it to Roger Penske.

== Qualifying ==
Juan Pablo Montoya claimed the pole position for the race; however, in post-race inspection, he was disqualified and placed 43rd because of illegal shock absorbers with a higher than usual gas pressure. As a result, Jimmie Johnson, who finished second in the qualifying, was awarded the pole position.

RANK	DRIVER	NBR	CAR	TIME	SPEED	
1	Jimmie Johnson	48	Chevrolet	31.394	172.007	
2	Mark Martin	8	Chevrolet	31.438	171.767	
3	Matt Kenseth	17	Ford	31.456	171.668	
4	Elliott Sadler	19	Dodge	31.482	171.527	
5	Martin Truex, Jr.	1	Chevrolet	31.518	171.331	
6	Paul Menard	15	Chevrolet	31.549	171.162	
7	Bill Elliott	21	Ford	31.581	170.989	*
8	Kasey Kahne	9	Dodge	31.623	170.762	
9	Brian Vickers	83	Toyota	31.623	170.762	
10	Casey Mears	5	Chevrolet	31.625	170.751	
11	Dale Earnhardt, Jr.	88	Chevrolet	31.628	170.735	
12	David Ragan	6	Ford	31.650	170.616	
13	Jeff Gordon	24	Chevrolet	31.670	170.508	
14	A.J. Allmendinger	84	Toyota	31.672	170.498	
15	Ryan Newman	12	Dodge	31.695	170.374	
16	Jamie McMurray	26	Ford	31.717	170.256	
17	Reed Sorenson	41	Dodge	31.718	170.250	
18	Greg Biffle	16	Ford	31.730	170.186	
19	Patrick Carpentier	10	Dodge	31.754	170.057	*
20	Marcos Ambrose	47	Ford	31.755	170.052	*
21	Bobby Labonte	43	Dodge	31.820	169.705	
22	Kyle Petty	45	Dodge	31.854	169.523	*
23	Sam Hornish, Jr.	77	Dodge	31.862	169.481	*
24	Clint Bowyer	07	Chevrolet	31.889	169.337	
25	Tony Raines	70	Chevrolet	31.889	169.337	*
26	Dave Blaney	22	Toyota	31.892	169.321	
27	Kyle Busch	18	Toyota	31.905	169.252	
28	Joey Logano	96	Toyota	31.910	169.226	*
29	Michael Waltrip	55	Toyota	31.923	169.157	
30	Denny Hamlin	11	Toyota	31.926	169.141	
31	Kurt Busch	2	Dodge	31.936	169.088	
32	David Gilliland	38	Ford	31.970	168.908	
33	Travis Kvapil	28	Ford	31.980	168.856	
34	Carl Edwards	99	Ford	31.989	168.808	
35	Regan Smith	01	Chevrolet	31.991	168.797	
36	Kevin Harvick	29	Chevrolet	32.000	168.750	
37	Jeff Burton	31	Chevrolet	32.056	168.455	
38	Scott Riggs	66	Chevrolet	32.085	168.303	
39	Joe Nemechek	78	Chevrolet	32.090	168.277	*
40	Michael McDowell	00	Toyota	32.096	168.245	*
41	Robby Gordon	7	Dodge	32.123	168.104	
42	David Reutimann	44	Toyota	32.155	167.937	OP
43	Tony Stewart	20	Toyota	32.281	167.281	OP
44	Johnny Sauter	08	Dodge	32.379	166.775	*
45	Juan Pablo Montoya	42	Dodge			OP

OP: qualified via owners points

PC: qualified as past champion

PR: provisional

QR: via qualifying race

* - had to qualify on time

Failed to qualify: Michael McDowell (#00), Johnny Sauter (#08).

== Race recap ==
The top three drivers the Chase finished 1-2-3 as Johnson beat Carl Edwards and Greg Biffle. This race was well known for its spectacular finish between Jimmie Johnson and Carl Edwards, where Edwards charged into the inside of Johnson in turn 3. The turn was too wide, causing Edwards' car to not turn completely at full speed, and hit the wall, where Johnson passed him. Johnson ducked to the apron and Edwards followed, but Johnson beat him by two car lengths.

== Results ==
POS	ST	#	DRIVER	SPONSOR / OWNER	CAR	LAPS	MONEY	STATUS	LED	PTS
1	1	48	Jimmie Johnson	Lowe's (Rick Hendrick)	Chevrolet	267	364411	running	124	195
2	34	99	Carl Edwards	Office Depot (Jack Roush)	Ford	267	259575	running	31	175
3	18	16	Greg Biffle	3M / Sherwin Williams (Jack Roush)	Ford	267	180100	running	0	165
4	13	24	Jeff Gordon	DuPont (Rick Hendrick)	Chevrolet	267	184786	running	0	160
5	3	17	Matt Kenseth	DeWalt (Jack Roush)	Ford	267	164866	running	49	160
6	36	29	Kevin Harvick	Shell / Pennzoil (Richard Childress)	Chevrolet	267	156411	running	0	150
7	37	31	Jeff Burton	AT&T Mobility (Richard Childress)	Chevrolet	267	150558	running	0	146
8	12	6	David Ragan	AAA Insurance (Jack Roush)	Ford	267	114550	running	0	142
9	14	84	A.J. Allmendinger	Red Bull (Dietrich Mateschitz)	Toyota	267	102850	running	0	138
10	4	19	Elliott Sadler	Garmin (Gillett Evernham Motorsports)	Dodge	267	137120	running	0	134
11	30	11	Denny Hamlin	FedEx Freight (Joe Gibbs)	Toyota	267	133816	running	1	135
12	24	07	Clint Bowyer	Jack Daniel's (Richard Childress)	Chevrolet	267	110825	running	0	127
13	11	88	Dale Earnhardt, Jr.	National Guard / AMP Energy (Rick Hendrick)	Chevrolet	267	104475	running	0	124
14	10	5	Casey Mears	Carquest / Kellogg's (Rick Hendrick)	Chevrolet	267	108675	running	29	126
15	9	83	Brian Vickers	Red Bull (Dietrich Mateschitz)	Toyota	267	102150	running	0	118
16	15	12	Ryan Newman	Alltel (Roger Penske)	Dodge	267	136775	running	0	115
17	16	26	Jamie McMurray	Crown Royal (Jack Roush)	Ford	267	102250	running	0	112
18	2	8	Mark Martin	U.S. Army (Dale Earnhardt, Inc.)	Chevrolet	266	126108	running	0	109
19	40	44	David Reutimann	UPS (Michael Waltrip)	Toyota	266	91250	running	1	111
20	42	42	Juan Pablo Montoya	Texaco / Havoline (Chip Ganassi)	Dodge	266	120808	running	0	103
21	8	9	Kasey Kahne	Budweiser (Gillett Evernham Motorsports)	Dodge	266	119841	running	0	100
22	32	38	David Gilliland	Ford. Drive One. (Yates Racing)	Ford	266	107308	running	0	97
23	25	70	Tony Raines	Haas Automation (Gene Haas)	Chevrolet	266	86100	running	0	94
24	21	43	Bobby Labonte	Cheerios / Betty Crocker (Petty Enterprises)	Dodge	266	124761	running	0	91
25	7	21	Bill Elliott	Motorcraft (Wood Brothers)	Ford	266	102770	running	0	88
26	17	41	Reed Sorenson	Target (Chip Ganassi)	Dodge	266	113739	running	0	85
27	6	15	Paul Menard	Menards / Super Clean (Dale Earnhardt, Inc.)	Chevrolet	266	93825	running	0	82
28	27	18	Kyle Busch	M&M's (Joe Gibbs)	Toyota	266	100125	running	1	84
29	19	10	Patrick Carpentier	LifeLock (Gillett Evernham Motorsports)	Dodge	266	86425	running	3	81
30	31	2	Kurt Busch	Miller Lite (Roger Penske)	Dodge	265	84675	running	0	73
31	26	22	Dave Blaney	Caterpillar (Bill Davis)	Toyota	265	100633	running	0	70
32	35	01	Regan Smith	DEI / Principal Financial Group (Dale Earnhardt, Inc.)	Chevrolet	265	89275	running	0	67
33	23	77	Sam Hornish, Jr.	Penske Truck Rental (Roger Penske)	Dodge	265	126650	running	0	64
34	33	28	Travis Kvapil	Hitachi Power Tools (Yates Racing)	Ford	264	109039	running	0	61
35	29	55	Michael Waltrip	NAPA Auto Parts (Michael Waltrip)	Toyota	264	94908	running	1	63
36	20	47	Marcos Ambrose	Little Debbie Snacks (Tad Geschickter)	Ford	264	80450	running	0	55
37	39	7	Robby Gordon	Menards (Robby Gordon)	Dodge	264	99863	running	0	52
38	43	78	Joe Nemechek	Furniture Row Racing (Barney Visser)	Chevrolet	263	80000	running	0	49
39	28	96	Joey Logano	DLP HDTV / Nebraska Furniture (Jeff Moorad)	Toyota	263	87800	running	0	46
40	41	20	Tony Stewart	Home Depot (Joe Gibbs)	Toyota	260	128336	running	0	43
41	22	45	Kyle Petty	Wells Fargo (Petty Enterprises)	Dodge	257	88922	running	0	40
42	38	66	Scott Riggs	State Water Heaters (Gene Haas)	Chevrolet	235	79205	running	0	37
43	5	1	Martin Truex, Jr.	Bass Pro Shops / Tracker Boats (Dale Earnhardt, Inc.)	Chevrolet	229	110425	transmission	27	39
