= 2007 Checker Auto Parts 500 =

2007 Checker Auto Parts 500 Presented by Pennzoil
Race details
- Race 35 of 36 in the 2007 NASCAR Nextel Cup Series season
- Map of the Phoenix International Raceway
- Date: November 11, 2007
- Official name: Checker Auto Parts 500
- Location: Phoenix International Raceway, Avondale, Arizona
- Course: Permanent racing facility
- Course length: 1.000 miles (1.609 km)
- Distance: 312 laps, 312 mi (502.115 km)
- Average speed: 102.989 miles per hour (165.745 km/h)

Pole position
Driver	Carl Edwards	Roush Fenway Racing
- Time: 27.114

Most laps led
Driver	Matt Kenseth	Roush Fenway Racing
- Laps: 93

Winner
No. 48	Jimmie Johnson	Hendrick Motorsports

Television in the United States
- Network: ABC
- Announcers: Jerry Punch, Rusty Wallace, and Andy Petree

The 2007 Checker Auto Parts 500 presented by Pennzoil, the next to last race of the 2007 NASCAR Nextel Cup season and the 2007 Chase for the Nextel Cup ran on Sunday, November 11, 2007, at Phoenix International Raceway in the Phoenix suburb of Avondale, Arizona. This race was the final race of sixteen to feature NASCAR's template known as the Car of Tomorrow, which was utilized full-time beginning with the 2008 season.

== Qualifying ==
With a lap of 27.114 seconds at a speed of 132.773 mph, Carl Edwards won his first pole of the season and third of his career. Fellow Chase driver Martin Truex Jr. started alongside him in second. Spring race winner Jeff Gordon started third, hometown hero J. J. Yeley took fourth, points leader Jimmie Johnson started sixth, and defending winner Kevin Harvick started 34th. Out of the open-wheel imports, IndyCar Series champion Sam Hornish Jr. made his first Cup race on speed, starting 26th, Patrick Carpentier, who is taking over for Scott Riggs, qualified 24th, and Jacques Villeneuve made his second Cup race, starting 27th.

Failed to Qualify: Michael Waltrip (#55), A. J. Allmendinger (#84), Ward Burton (#4), John Andretti (#49), Dale Jarrett (#44), David Reutimann (#00)

NOTE: This was the first time in 2007 where all three Michael Waltrip Racing cars had missed a race.

== Results ==
Top Ten Results: (NOTE: Chase drivers are in bold italics.)

Pos.	No.	Driver	Car	Team
1.	#48	**Jimmie Johnson**	Chevrolet	Hendrick Motorsports
2.	#16	Greg Biffle	Ford	Roush Fenway Racing
3.	#17	**Matt Kenseth**	Ford	Roush Fenway Racing
4.	#20	**Tony Stewart**	Chevrolet	Joe Gibbs Racing
5.	#12	Ryan Newman	Dodge	Penske Racing
6.	#29	**Kevin Harvick**	Chevrolet	Richard Childress Racing
7.	#1	**Martin Truex Jr.**	Chevrolet	Dale Earnhardt Incorporated
8.	#5	**Kyle Busch**	Chevrolet	Hendrick Motorsports
9.	#31	**Jeff Burton**	Chevrolet	Richard Childress Racing
10.	#24	**Jeff Gordon**	Chevrolet	Hendrick Motorsports

Previous race: 2007 Dickies 500	Nextel Cup Series; 2007 season	Next race: 2007 Ford 400
