= 2008 Chase for the Sprint Cup =

The 2008 Chase for the Sprint Cup was contested in the final ten races of the 2008 NASCAR Sprint Cup Series to determine a champion. The Chase began with the Sylvania 300 on September 14, 2008, at New Hampshire Motor Speedway and ended with the Ford 400 on November 16, 2008, at Homestead-Miami Speedway. The 2008 Chase was won by Jimmie Johnson, his third consecutive championship.

From 2004 through 2007, the championship system was known as the "Chase for the Nextel Cup", but with the 2005 merger of Sprint and Nextel, the name of the series became known as the Sprint Cup Series in 2008.

== Drivers ==
Chase Standings
PL	Seed	Driver	Pts	Behind	P	W	T5	T10	DNF
1	3	Jimmie Johnson	6,073	Leader	5	6	13	20	1
2	9	Greg Biffle	5,924	(−149)	2	2	11	15	3
3	7	Jeff Burton	5,921	(−152)	0	2	7	17	2
4	2	Carl Edwards	5,875	(−168)	1	6	15	23	2
5	5	Clint Bowyer	5,831	(−242)	0	1	5	15	0
6	11	Kevin Harvick	5,817	(−256)	0	0	6	16	0
7	10	Jeff Gordon	5,798	(−275)	3	0	11	16	5
8	8	Tony Stewart	5,735	(−338)	0	1	10	15	3
9	4	Dale Earnhardt Jr.	5,694	(−379)	1	1	10	15	1
10	12	Matt Kenseth	5,665	(−408)	0	0	8	18	3
11	6	Denny Hamlin	5,653	(−420)	1	1	10	16	3
12	1	Kyle Busch	5,628	(−445)	2	8	16	18	2

=== Seeding ===
Seedings at the start of The Chase
Seed	Driver	P
1	Kyle Busch	5,080
2	Carl Edwards	5,050^{♦}
3	Jimmie Johnson	5,040
4	Dale Earnhardt Jr.	5,010
5	Clint Bowyer	5,010
6	Denny Hamlin	5,010
7	Jeff Burton	5,010
8	Tony Stewart	5,000
9	Greg Biffle	5,000
10	Jeff Gordon	5,000
11	Kevin Harvick	5,000
12	Matt Kenseth	5,000

♦ – Edwards was docked the ten-point winner's bonus as a result of a violation found during post-race inspection at the UAW-Dodge 400 in Las Vegas.

Regular season standings with seeding change
PL	Driver	₧	Behind	+/-
1	Ky. Busch	3,878	Leader	N/C
2	Edwards	3,671	(−207)	N/C
3	Johnson	3,576	(−302)	N/C
4	Earnhardt Jr.	3,488	(−390)	N/C
5	J. Burton	3,384	(−394)	-2
6	Stewart	3,285	(−493)	-2
7	Harvick	3,283	(−495)	-4
8	Biffle	3,280	(−498)	-1
9	Hamlin	3,235	(−543)	+3
10	J. Gordon	3,221	(−657)	N/C
11	Kenseth	3,132	(−746)	-1
12	Bowyer	3,116	(−762)	+7

== Schedule ==
Date	Race	Track	2007 winner	2008 winner
September 14	Sylvania 300	New Hampshire Motor Speedway; Loudon, New Hampshire	Clint Bowyer	Greg Biffle
September 21	Camping World RV 400	Dover International Speedway; Dover, Delaware	Carl Edwards	Greg Biffle
September 28	Camping World RV 400 presented by Coleman	Kansas Speedway; Kansas City, Kansas	Greg Biffle≠	Jimmie Johnson
October 5	AMP Energy 500	Talladega Superspeedway; Talladega, Alabama	Jeff Gordon	Tony Stewart
October 11	Bank of America 500 ^{♣}	Lowe's Motor Speedway; Concord, North Carolina	Jeff Gordon	Jeff Burton
October 19	TUMS QuikPak 500	Martinsville Speedway; Martinsville, Virginia	Jimmie Johnson	Jimmie Johnson
October 26	Pep Boys Auto 500	Atlanta Motor Speedway; Hampton, Georgia	Jimmie Johnson	Carl Edwards
November 2	Dickies 500 ^{♣}	Texas Motor Speedway; Fort Worth, Texas	Jimmie Johnson	Carl Edwards
November 9	Checker Auto Parts 500	Phoenix International Raceway; Avondale, Arizona	Jimmie Johnson	Jimmie Johnson
November 16	Ford 400 ^{♣}	Homestead-Miami Speedway; Homestead, Florida	Matt Kenseth	Carl Edwards

≠ — Non-qualifier for the 2007 Chase.
Italics denotes non-qualifier for 2008 chase.
♣ – Denotes night race or race that will start in the late afternoon and finish at night.

== Television ==
This marked the second year of exclusive national television coverage of the Chase for the Sprint Cup on ABC. Dr. Jerry Punch remained in the play-by-play position, with Andy Petree in one color commentary position, but there were changes in the booth and host position.

Brent Musburger and Suzy Kolber were out in the host position, and former MRN Radio, TNT and NBC play-by-play voice Allen Bestwick took their place after spending the 2007 season on pit road. Joining him were 1989 NASCAR series champion Rusty Wallace and JTG Daugherty Racing owner and former Cleveland Cavaliers center Brad Daugherty in the on-site studio, while 1999 series champion Dale Jarrett took Wallace's spot in the broadcast booth and Shannon Spake replaced Bestwick on pit road, joining Jamie Little, Dave Burns and Mike Massaro.

== Results ==
NOTE: Actual race finish in parentheses.

=== Race One: 2008 Sylvania 300 ===
Results:

1. Greg Biffle (1)
2. Jimmie Johnson (2)
3. Carl Edwards (3)
4. Jeff Burton (4)
5. Dale Earnhardt Jr. (5)
6. Tony Stewart (8)
7. Denny Hamlin (9)
8. Kevin Harvick (10)
9. Clint Bowyer (12)
10. Jeff Gordon (14)
11. Kyle Busch (35)
12. Matt Kenseth (40)

Point Standings:

1. Carl Edwards 5,220 ₧ (leader via tiebreaker with Johnson, six wins)
2. Jimmie Johnson tied
3. Greg Biffle −30
4. Dale Earnhardt Jr. -50 (fourth via tiebreak with Burton, more top 5 finishes)
5. Jeff Burton −50
6. Denny Hamlin −72
7. Tony Stewart −77
8. Kyle Busch −78
9. Clint Bowyer −83
10. Kevin Harvick −86
11. Jeff Gordon −99
12. Matt Kenseth −177

=== Race Two: 2008 Camping World RV 400 ===
Results:

1. Greg Biffle (1)
2. Matt Kenseth (2)
3. Carl Edwards (3)
4. Jimmie Johnson (5)
5. Kevin Harvick(6)
6. Jeff Gordon (7)
7. Clint Bowyer (8)
8. Jeff Burton (9)
9. Tony Stewart (11)
10. Dale Earhnhardt Jr. (24)
11. Denny Hamlin (39)
12. Kyle Busch (43)

Points:

1. Carl Edwards, 5,390 ₧, leader
2. Jimmie Johnson −10 (Second via tiebreaker with Biffle, four wins)
3. Greg Biffle −10
4. Jeff Burton −82
5. Kevin Harvick −101
6. Clint Bowyer −106
7. Tony Stewart −113
8. Jeff Gordon −118
9. Dale Earhnardt Jr. -129
10. Matt Kenseth −167
11. Denny Hamlin, −193
12. Kyle Busch, −210

=== Race Three: 2008 Camping World RV 400 presented by Coleman ===
Results:

1. Jimmie Johnson (1)
2. Carl Edwards (2)
3. Greg Biffle (3)
4. Jeff Gordon (4)
5. Matt Kenseth (5)
6. Kevin Harvick (6)
7. Jeff Burton (7)
8. Denny Hamlin (11)
9. Clint Bowyer (12)
10. Dale Earnhardt Jr. (13)
11. Kyle Busch (28)
12. Tony Stewart (40)

Points:

1. Jimmie Johnson, 5,575 ₧, leader
2. Carl Edwards, −10
3. Greg Biffle, −30
4. Jeff Burton, −121
5. Kevin Harvick, −136
6. Jeff Gordon, −143
7. Clint Bowyer, −164
8. Dale Earnhardt Jr., −190
9. Matt Kenseth, −192
10. Denny Hamlin, −243
11. Tony Stewart, −255
12. Kyle Busch, −311

=== Race Four: 2008 AMP Energy 500 ===
Results:

1. Tony Stewart (1)
2. Jeff Burton (4)
3. Clint Bowyer (5)
4. Jimmie Johnson (9)
5. Kyle Busch (15)
6. Kevin Harvick (20)
7. Greg Biffle (24)
8. Matt Kenseth (26)
9. Dale Earnhardt Jr. (28)
10. Carl Edwards (29)
11. Jeff Gordon (38)
12. Denny Hamlin (39)

Points:

1. Jimmie Johnson, 5,718 ₧, leader
2. Carl Edwards, −72
3. Greg Biffle, −77
4. Jeff Burton, −99
5. Clint Bowyer, −152
6. Kevin Harvick, −171
7. Tony Stewart, −203
8. Jeff Gordon, −232
9. Matt Kenseth, −245
10. Dale Earnhardt Jr., −249
11. Kyle Busch, −331
12. Denny Hamlin, −335

=== Race Five: 2008 Bank of America 500 ===
Results:

1. Jeff Burton (1)
2. Kyle Busch (4)
3. Jimmie Johnson (6)
4. Greg Biffle (7)
5. Jeff Gordon (8)
6. Tony Stewart (11)
7. Clint Bowyer (12)
8. Kevin Harvick (13)
9. Denny Hamlin (16)
10. Carl Edwards (33)
11. Dale Earnhardt Jr. (36)
12. Matt Kenseth (41)

Points:

1. Jimmie Johnson, 5,878 ₧, leader
2. Jeff Burton, −69
3. Greg Biffle, −86
4. Carl Edwards, −168
5. Clint Bowyer, −185
6. Kevin Harvick, −207
7. Tony Stewart, −228
8. Jeff Gordon, −245
9. Kyle Busch, −326
10. Dale Earnhardt Jr., −354
11. Matt Kenseth, −360
12. Denny Hamlin, −380

=== Race Six: 2008 TUMS QuikPak 500 ===
Results:

1. Jimmie Johnson (1)
2. Dale Earnhardt Jr. (2)
3. Carl Edwards (3)
4. Jeff Gordon (4)
5. Denny Hamlin (5)
6. Kevin Harvick (7)
7. Matt Kenseth (8)
8. Clint Bowyer (9)
9. Greg Biffle (12)
10. Jeff Burton (17)
11. Tony Stewart (26)
12. Kyle Busch (29)

Points:

1. Jimmie Johnson, 6,073 ₧, leader
2. Greg Biffle, −149
3. Jeff Burton, −152
4. Carl Edwards, −198
5. Clint Bowyer, −242
6. Kevin Harvick, −256
7. Jeff Gordon, −275
8. Tony Stewart, −338
9. Dale Earnhardt Jr., −379
10. Matt Kenseth, −408
11. Denny Hamlin, −420
12. Kyle Busch, −445

== See also ==
- 2008 NASCAR Sprint Cup Series
- 2008 NASCAR Nationwide Series
- 2008 NASCAR Craftsman Truck Series

Preceded by 2007 Chase for the Nextel Cup	NASCAR seasons 2008	Succeeded by 2009 Chase for the Sprint Cup
