= South African cricket team in Zimbabwe in 2007 =

South Africa in Zimbabwe in 2007
	South Africa	Zimbabwe
- Dates: 22 August – 26 August 2007
Captains	Graeme Smith	Prosper Utseya

One Day International series
- Results: South Africa won the 3-match series 3–0
Most runs	de Villiers 170; Smith 170; Gibbs 111	Taibu 172; Taylor 105; Masakadza 85
Most wickets	Morkel 4 Steyn 3 van der Wath 3	Utseya 3 Chigumbura 3 Brent 3
- Player of the series: AB de Villiers

The South African cricket team toured Zimbabwe for three One Day Internationals in August 2007. The tour will see both teams in action for the first time since the 2007 Cricket World Cup, and will be played two weeks before the start of the 2007 Twenty20 World Championship to be held by the South Africans. South Africa's A team will also be touring, playing against a Zimbabwean Select XI on two occasions for First-class matches.

== Squads ==
South Africa Graeme Smith (c) Gulam Bodi Loots Bosman AB de Villiers (wk) Jean-Paul Duminy Herschelle Gibbs Albie Morkel Morné Morkel Makhaya Ntini Vernon Philander Shaun Pollock Dale Steyn Thandi Tshabalala Johan van der Wath	South Africa A Boeta Dippenaar (c) Yusuf Abdullah Hashim Amla Johan Botha Andrew Hall Paul Harris Imraan Khan Charl Langeveldt André Nel Justin Ontong Alviro Petersen Ashwell Prince Thami Tsolekile (wk) Morne van Wyk Friedel de Wet	Zimbabwe Prosper Utseya (c) Gary Brent Regis Chakabva Elton Chigumbura Graeme Cremer Keith Dabengwa Timycen Maruma Hamilton Masakadza Stuart Matsikenyeri Christopher Mpofu Tawanda Mupariwa Vusi Sibanda Tatenda Taibu (wk) Brendan Taylor Prosper Tsvanhu Sean Williams

- Players greyed out withdrew from the squad.

== Matches ==
=== First ODI ===
22 August
(scorecard)

Zimbabwe; 206 (50 overs)	v	South Africa; 210/5 (46.4 overs)
Gary Brent 59* (82); Elton Chigumbura 59 (74); Vernon Philander 2/15 (8 overs)		AB de Villiers 63 (85); Gulam Bodi 51 (99); Graeme Smith 50 (57); Prosper Utseya 2/32 (10 overs)

South Africa won by 5 wickets
Queens Sports Club, Bulawayo
Umpires: Steve Davis and Russell Tiffin
Player of the match: Gary Brent

=== Second ODI ===
25 August
(scorecard)

Zimbabwe; 247/7 (50 overs)	v	South Africa; 251/2 (39.1 overs)
Sean Williams 54 (50); Stuart Matsikenyeri 52 (51); Dale Steyn 3/65 (10 overs)		Herschelle Gibbs 111 (100); Graeme Smith 96 (99); Sean Williams 1/10 (2.1 overs)

South Africa won by 8 wickets
Harare Sports Club, Harare
Umpires: Steve Davis and Russell Tiffin
Player of the match: Herschelle Gibbs

=== Third ODI ===
26 August
(scorecard)

South Africa; 323/9 (50 overs)	v	Zimbabwe; 295/7 (50 overs)
AB de Villiers 107 (89); Albie Morkel 97 (104); Gary Brent 3/58 (9 overs)		Tatenda Taibu 107* (103); Johan van der Wath 2/50 (8 overs)

South Africa win by 28 runs
Harare Sports Club, Harare
Umpires: Kevan Barbour and Steve Davis
Player of the match: AB de Villiers

== South Africa A tour ==
South Africa A also toured Zimbabwe, playing two First-class matches against a Zimbabwean Select XI.

=== South Africa A v Zimbabwe Select XI - first First-class match ===
9 - 12 August
(Scorecard)

Zimbabwe Select XI	v	South Africa A
242 (99 overs); Vusi Sibanda 68 (148); Tatenda Taibu 63* (167); Charl Langeveldt 4/62 (24 overs); Andrew Hall 3/29 (14 overs)		280 (71.3 overs); Justin Ontong 101 (86); Boeta Dippenaar 77 (146); Gary Brent 4/48 (14 overs); Christopher Mpofu 3/39 (8.3 overs)
169 (77 overs); Stuart Matsikenyeri 67* (108); Paul Harris 4/38 (28 overs); Andrew Hall 3/38 (14 overs)		132/2 (37.2 overs); Morne van Wyk 63* (101)

South Africa A won by 8 wickets
Harare Sports Club, Harare
Umpires: Kevan Barbour and Ian Robinson

=== South Africa A v Zimbabwe Select XI - second First-class match ===
15 - 18 August
(Scorecard)

South Africa A	v	Zimbabwe Select XI
542/7d (160.2 overs); Boeta Dippenaar 189 (337); Hashim Amla 142 (295); Justin Ontong 70 (98)		155 (73.3 overs) Paul Harris 5/67 (32 overs); André Nel 3/23 (16 overs)
		168 (f/o) (72.2 overs) Paul Harris 4/77 (31 overs); André Nel 3/18 (16 overs)

South Africa A won by an innings and 219 runs
Queens Sports Club, Bulawayo
Umpires: Kevan Barbour and Russell Tiffin
