= 2007 Chase for the Nextel Cup =

The 2007 Chase for the Nextel Cup was the ten-race playoffs which concluded the 2007 NASCAR Nextel Cup season. It began with the Sylvania 300 on September 16, 2007, at New Hampshire Motor Speedway and ended with the Ford 400 on November 18 of the same year at Homestead-Miami Speedway, with Jimmie Johnson winning the 2007 NASCAR Nextel Cup Championship.

The entry requirements for the Chase changed this year. Previously, the top ten drivers in the points standings and anyone else within 400 points of the leader after the Chevy Rock and Roll 400 would qualify for the Chase. This year, the top twelve drivers in the points standings after the Chevy Rock and Roll 400 automatically qualified for the Chase with each drivers' point total reset to 5,000 points, with a ten-point bonus for each race won during the first 26 races. In addition, as NASCAR makes the full-time transition to the Car of Tomorrow, half of the races used the new template, and the other half used the older template, which was officially retired from Cup competition following the Ford 400. The title "Chase for the Nextel Cup" was also retired, as the season ending playoff will be renamed the "Chase for the Sprint Cup" in 2008.

== Final standings ==
Pos	Seed	Driver	Car	S	P	W	T5	T10	DNF	Winnings (USD)	Pts/(Behind)
1	1	(California) **Jimmie Johnson**	#48 Chevrolet	36	4	10	20	24	4	$7,646,421	**6,723**/ **2007 Champion**
2	2	(California) **Jeff Gordon**	#24 Chevrolet	36	7	6	21	30	1	$7,148,662	6,696 (-77)
3	12	(Kansas) **Clint Bowyer**	#07 Chevrolet	36	2	1	5	17	0	$4,215,869	6,377 (-346)
4	8	(Wisconsin) **Matt Kenseth**	#17 Ford	36	0	2	13	22	4	$6,485,629	6,298 (-425)
5	9	(Nevada) **Kyle Busch**	#5 Chevrolet	36	0	1	11	20	2	$4,685,518	6,293 (-430)
6	3	(Indiana) **Tony Stewart**	#20 Chevrolet	36	0	3	11	23	4	$6,396,751	6,242 (-481)
7	5	(Nevada) **Kurt Busch**	#2 Dodge	36	1	2	6	14	3	$5,287,846	6,231 (-492)
8	10	(Virginia) **Jeff Burton**	#31 Chevrolet	36	0	1	9	18	3	$6,015,667	6,231 (-492)
9	4	(Missouri) **Carl Edwards**	#99 Ford	36	1	3	11	15	4	$4,611,967	6,222 (-501)
10	11	(California) **Kevin Harvick**	#29 Chevrolet	36	0	1	4	15	0	$7,494,593	6,199 (-524)
11	7	(New Jersey) Martin Truex Jr.	#1 Chevrolet	36	1	1	7	14	4	$5,003,881	6,164 (-559)
12	6	(Virginia) Denny Hamlin	#11 Chevrolet	36	1	1	12	18	1	$4,983,814	6,143 (-580)

Key: S-Starts; P-Poles; W-Wins; T5-Top 5 finishes; T10-Top 10 finishes; DNF-Did not finish; Pts-Points.
NOTES:'
1. The original seedings saw Edwards placed fourth ahead of Kurt Busch based on most second-place finishes, while Denny Hamlin was seeded sixth based on the same criteria, followed by Truex, Kenseth, Kyle Busch, Jeff Burton and Harvick, with further tiebreakers based on third-place finishes, etc.
2. Kurt Busch by most wins finished in seventh place ahead of Jeff Burton.
3. Those in boldface were invited to the 2007 Nextel Cup Banquet November 30 in New York.

=== Standings Plus/Minus Through The Chase ===
Driver	Seed	1		2		3		4		5		6		7		8		9		10		Final
Driver	Seed	Chg	Std	Chg	Std	Chg	Std	Chg	Std	Chg	Std	Chg	Std	Chg	Std	Chg	Std	Chg	Std	Chg	Std	**Std**	**Chg**
Jimmie Johnson	**1**	n/c	**1**	-2	3	+2	**1**	-1	2	n/c	2	n/c	2	n/c	2	+1	**1**	n/c	**1**	n/c	**1**	**1**	n/c
Jeff Gordon	2	n/c	2	+1	**1**	-1	2	+1	**1**	n/c	**1**	n/c	**1**	n/c	**1**	-1	2	n/c	2	n/c	2	2	n/c
Tony Stewart	3	n/c	3	+1	2	-2	4	n/c	4	n/c	4	n/c	4	-1	5	-1	6	+1	5	-1	6	6	-3
Carl Edwards	4	-4	8	+2	6	-1	7	+1	6	+1	5	n/c	5	+1	4	-1	5	-4	9	n/c	9	9	-5
Kurt Busch	5	-7	12	+1	11	+2	9	+2	7	n/c	7	-3	10	+1	9	n/c	9	-1	10	+3	7	7	-2
Denny Hamlin	6	-3	9	-3	12	n/c	12	+3	9	n/c	9	+1	8	-2	10	-1	11	-1	12	n/c	12	12	-6
Martin Truex Jr.	7	+1	6	-1	7	-1	8	-2	10	-1	11	n/c	11	-1	12	n/c	12	+1	11	n/c	11	11	-4
Matt Kenseth	8	+1	7	-3	10	-1	11	n/c	11	-1	12	n/c	12	+1	11	+1	10	+4	6	+2	4	4	+4
Kyle Busch	9	+4	5	+1	4	-2	6	-2	8	+2	6	n/c	6	n/c	6	+2	4	n/c	4	-1	5	5	-4
Jeff Burton	10	-1	11	+3	8	-2	10	-2	12	+2	10	+1	9	+1	8	+1	7	-1	8	n/c	8	8	+2
Kevin Harvick	11	+1	10	+1	9	+4	5	n/c	5	-3	8	+1	7	n/c	7	-1	8	+1	7	-3	10	10	+1
Clint Bowyer	12	+8	4	-1	5	+2	3	n/c	3	n/c	3	n/c	3	n/c	3	n/c	3	n/c	3	n/c	3	3	+9

Chg = Change in position. n/c = No change in position. Std = Standing After Race

=== Standings at beginning of Chase ===
1. Jimmie Johnson, 5,060 points, leader
2. Jeff Gordon, 5,040, -20
3. Tony Stewart, 5,030, -30
4. Carl Edwards, 5,020, -40
5. Kurt Busch, 5,020, -40
6. Denny Hamlin, 5,010, -50
7. Martin Truex, Jr., 5,010, -50
8. Matt Kenseth, 5,010, -50
9. Kyle Busch, 5,010, -50
10. Jeff Burton, 5,010, -50
11. Kevin Harvick, 5,010, -50
12. Clint Bowyer, 5,000, -60

=== Standings at end of the "regular season" ===
At the conclusion of the "regular season" (the 2007 Chevy Rock & Roll 400), these were the point standings before the Chase adjustments were made. Also indicated are how far up or down in the standings a driver went when the Chase points were awarded:

1. Jeff Gordon, 3,849 pts., leader, down one spot.
2. Tony Stewart, -312 pts, down one spot.
3. Denny Hamlin, -359, down three spots.
4. Jimmie Johnson, -410 pts., up three spots.
5. Matt Kenseth, -419 pts., down three spots.
6. Carl Edwards, -427 pts., up two spots.
7. Jeff Burton, -521 pts., down three spots.
8. Kyle Busch, -547 pts., down one spot.
9. Clint Bowyer, -670 pts., down three spots.
10. Kurt Busch, -689 pts. and two wins, up five spots.
11. Martin Truex, Jr., -689 pts. and one win, up four spots.
12. Kevin Harvick, -694 pts., up one spot.

== Races ==
Drivers in italics did not qualify for the 2007 Chase.

Date	Race	Track	2006 winner	2007 winner	Car
September 16	Sylvania 300	New Hampshire Motor Speedway; Loudon, New Hampshire	Kevin Harvick	Clint Bowyer	CoT
September 23	Dodge Dealers 400	Dover International Speedway; Dover, Delaware	Jeff Burton	Carl Edwards	CoT
September 30	LifeLock 400	Kansas Speedway; Kansas City, Kansas	Tony Stewart≠	Greg Biffle	S
October 7	UAW Ford 500	Talladega Superspeedway; Talladega, Alabama	Brian Vickers≠	Jeff Gordon	CoT
October 13	Bank of America 500	Lowe's Motor Speedway; Concord, North Carolina	Kasey Kahne	Jeff Gordon	S
October 21	Subway 500	Martinsville Speedway; Martinsville, Virginia	Jimmie Johnson	Jimmie Johnson	CoT
October 28	Pep Boys Auto 500	Atlanta Motor Speedway; Hampton, Georgia	Tony Stewart≠	Jimmie Johnson	S
November 4	Dickies 500	Texas Motor Speedway; Justin, Texas	Tony Stewart≠	Jimmie Johnson	S
November 11	Checker Auto Parts 500	Phoenix International Raceway; Avondale, Arizona	Kevin Harvick	Jimmie Johnson	CoT
November 18	Ford 400	Homestead-Miami Speedway; Homestead, Florida	Greg Biffle≠	Matt Kenseth	S

KEY: S — Standard. CoT — Car of Tomorrow.
≠ — Did not qualify for 2006 Chase.

=== Race results ===
(NOTE: Actual finish is in parentheses.)

==== Race 1 - 2007 Sylvania 300 ====
Finishing Order

1. Clint Bowyer (1)
2. Jeff Gordon (2)
3. Tony Stewart (3)
4. Kyle Busch (4)
5. Martin Truex Jr. (5)
6. Jimmie Johnson (6)
7. Matt Kenseth (7)
8. Carl Edwards (12)
9. Denny Hamlin (15)
10. Kevin Harvick (17)
11. Jeff Burton (18)
12. Kurt Busch (25)

Standings after race:

1. Jimmie Johnson, 5,210, Leader via most wins tiebreaker.
2. Jeff Gordon, 5,210
3. Tony Stewart, 5,200, -10
4. Clint Bowyer, 5,195, -15
5. Kyle Busch, 5,175, -35
6. Martin Truex Jr., 5,170, -40
7. Matt Kenseth, 5,156, -54
8. Carl Edwards, 5,147, -63
9. Denny Hamlin, 5,128, -82
10. Kevin Harvick, 5,122, -88
11. Jeff Burton, 5,119, -91
12. Kurt Busch, 5,108, -102

==== Race 2 - 2007 Dodge Dealers 400 ====
Finishing Order

1. Carl Edwards (1) ·
2. Kyle Busch (5)
3. Jeff Burton (7)
4. Tony Stewart (9)
5. Jeff Gordon (11)
6. Clint Bowyer (12)
7. Martin Truex Jr. (13)
8. Jimmie Johnson (14)
9. Kevin Harvick (20)
10. Kurt Busch (29)
11. Matt Kenseth (35)
12. Denny Hamlin (38)

Standings after race (before penalty):

1. Jeff Gordon, 5,340
2. Tony Stewart, 5,338, -2
3. Carl Edwards, 5,337, -3
4. Jimmie Johnson, 5,336, -4
5. Kyle Busch, 5,330, -10
6. Clint Bowyer, 5,322, -18
7. Martin Truex Jr., 5,294, -46
8. Jeff Burton, 5,265, -75
9. Kevin Harvick, 5,225, -115
10. Matt Kenseth, 5,224, -116
11. Kurt Busch, 5,189, -151
12. Denny Hamlin, 5,182, -158

Standings after race (after penalty):

1. Jeff Gordon, 5,340, leader
2. Tony Stewart, 5,338, -2
3. Jimmie Johnson, 5,336, -4
4. Kyle Busch, 5,330, -10
5. Clint Bowyer, 5,322, -18
6. Carl Edwards, 5,312, -28
7. Martin Truex Jr., 5,294, -46
8. Jeff Burton, 5,265, -75
9. Kevin Harvick, 5,225, -115
10. Matt Kenseth, 5,224, -116
11. Kurt Busch, 5,189, -151
12. Denny Hamlin, 5,182, -158

==== Race 3 - 2007 LifeLock 400 ====
Finishing order

1. Clint Bowyer (2)
2. Jimmie Johnson (3)
3. Jeff Gordon (4)
4. Kevin Harvick (6)
5. Kurt Busch (11)
6. Denny Hamlin (29)
7. Matt Kenseth (35)
8. Jeff Burton (36)
9. Carl Edwards (37)
10. Martin Truex Jr. (38)
11. Tony Stewart (29)
12. Kyle Busch (41)

Standings after race:

1. Jimmie Johnson, 5,506, leader
2. Jeff Gordon, 5,505, -1
3. Clint Bowyer, 5,492, -14
4. Tony Stewart, 5,384, -17
5. Kevin Harvick, 5,380, -126
6. Kyle Busch, 5,370, -136
7. Carl Edwards, 5,346, -142
8. Martin Truex Jr., 5,348, -158
9. Kurt Busch, 5,379, -177
10. Jeff Burton, 5,370, -186
11. Matt Kenseth, 5,287, -219
12. Denny Hamlin, 5,258, -248

==== Race 4 - 2007 UAW-Ford 500 ====
Finishing order

1. Jeff Gordon (1)
2. Jimmie Johnson (2)
3. Denny Hamlin (4)
4. Kurt Busch (7)
5. Tony Stewart (8)
6. Clint Bowyer (11)
7. Carl Edwards (14)
8. Kevin Harvick (20)
9. Matt Kenseth (26)
10. Kyle Busch (36)
11. Martin Truex Jr. (42)
12. Jeff Burton (43)

Standings after race:

1. Jeff Gordon 5,690, leader
2. Jimmie Johnson 5,681, -9
3. Clint Bowyer 5,627, -63
4. Tony Stewart 5,536, -154
5. Kevin Harvick 5,488, -202
6. Carl Edwards 5,485, -205
7. Kurt Busch 5,475, -215
8. Kyle Busch 5,430, -260
9. Denny Hamlin 5,428, -262
10. Martin Truex Jr. 5,390, -300
11. Matt Kenseth 5,372, -318
12. Jeff Burton 5,354, -336

==== Race 5 - 2007 Bank of America 500 ====
Finishing order

1. Jeff Gordon (1)
2. Clint Bowyer (2)
3. Kyle Busch (3)
4. Jeff Burton (4)
5. Carl Edwards (5)
6. Tony Stewart (7)
7. Jimmie Johnson (14)
8. Martin Truex Jr. (17)
9. Denny Hamlin (20)
10. Kurt Busch (26)
11. Kevin Harvick (33)
12. Matt Kenseth (34)

Standings after race:

1. Jeff Gordon 5880, leader
2. Jimmie Johnson 5,812, -68
3. Clint Bowyer 5,802, -78
4. Tony Stewart 5,682, -198
5. Carl Edwards 5,640, -240
6. Kyle Busch 5,600, -280
7. Kurt Busch 5,565, -315
8. Kevin Harvick 5,552, -328
9. Denny Hamlin 5,531, -349
10. Jeff Burton 5,514, -366
11. Martin Truex Jr. 5,502, -378
12. Matt Kenseth 5,438, -442

==== Race 6 - 2007 Subway 500 ====
Finishing order

1. Jimmie Johnson (1)
2. Jeff Gordon (3)
3. Kyle Busch (4)
4. Matt Kenseth (5)
5. Denny Hamlin (6)
6. Clint Bowyer (9)
7. Kevin Harvick (10)
8. Carl Edwards (11)
9. Jeff Burton (12)
10. Tony Stewart (13)
11. Martin Truex Jr. (19)
12. Kurt Busch (31)

Standings after race:

1. Jeff Gordon 6055, leader
2. Jimmie Johnson 6002, -53
3. Clint Bowyer 5940, -115
4. Tony Stewart 5806, -249
5. Carl Edwards 5770, -285
6. Kyle Busch 5764, -290
7. Kevin Harvick 5686, -369
8. Denny Hamlin 5681, -374
9. Jeff Burton 5646, -409
10. Kurt Busch 5635, -420
11. Martin Truex Jr. 5608, -447
12. Matt Kenseth 5593, -462

==== Race 7 - 2007 Pep Boys Auto 500 ====
Finishing order

1. Jimmie Johnson (1)
2. Carl Edwards (2)
3. Matt Kenseth (4)
4. Jeff Burton (5)
5. Clint Bowyer (6)
6. Jeff Gordon (7)
7. Kurt Busch (8)
8. Kevin Harvick (15)
9. Kyle Busch (20)
10. Denny Hamlin (24)
11. Tony Stewart (30)
12. Martin Truex Jr. (31)

Standings after race:

1. Jeff Gordon 6201, leader
2. Jimmie Johnson 6192, -9
3. Clint Bowyer 6090, -111
4. Carl Edwards 5940, -261
5. Tony Stewart 5879, -322
6. Kyle Busch 5873, -328
7. Kevin Harvick 5809, -392
8. Jeff Burton 5801, -400
9. Kurt Busch 5782, -419
10. Denny Hamlin 5777, -424
11. Matt Kenseth 5752, -448
12. Martin Truex Jr. 5688, -513

NOTE: Drivers in Italics are mathematically eliminated from winning the championship.

==== Race 8 - 2007 Dickies 500 ====
Finishing order

1. Jimmie Johnson (1)
2. Matt Kenseth (2)
3. Martin Truex Jr. (3)
4. Kyle Busch (4)
5. Jeff Burton (6)
6. Jeff Gordon (7)
7. Kurt Busch (8)
8. Kevin Harvick (10)
9. Tony Stewart (11)
10. Clint Bowyer (19)
11. Carl Edwards (26)
12. Denny Hamlin (29)

Standings after race:

1. Jimmie Johnson 6382, leader
2. Jeff Gordon 6352, -30
3. Clint Bowyer 6201, -181
4. Kyle Busch 6043, -339
5. Carl Edwards 6025, -357
6. Tony Stewart 6009, -373
7. Jeff Burton 5951, -431
8. Kevin Harvick 5943, -439
9. Kurt Busch 5929, -453
10. Matt Kenseth 5928, -454
11. Denny Hamlin 5858, -524
12. Martin Truex Jr. 5858, -524

NOTES: 1. Drivers in Italics are mathematically eliminated from winning the championship.
2. Carl Edwards and Tony Stewart were mathematically eliminated when Jimmie Johnson started the 2007 Checker Auto Parts 500

==== Race 9 - 2007 Checker Auto Parts 500 ====
Finishing order

1. Jimmie Johnson (1)
2. Matt Kenseth (3)
3. Tony Stewart (4)
4. Kevin Harvick (6)
5. Martin Truex Jr. (7)
6. Kyle Busch (8)
7. Jeff Burton (9)
8. Jeff Gordon (10)
9. Clint Bowyer (11)
10. Kurt Busch (12)
11. Denny Hamlin (16)
12. Carl Edwards (42)

Standings after race:

1. Jimmie Johnson 6572, leader
2. Jeff Gordon 6486, -86
3. Clint Bowyer 6331, -241
4. Kyle Busch 6185, -387
5. Tony Stewart 6169, -403
6. Matt Kenseth 6103, -469
7. Kevin Harvick 6093, -479
8. Jeff Burton 6089, -483
9. Carl Edwards 6067, -505
10. Kurt Busch 6056, -516
11. Martin Truex, Jr. 6009, -593
12. Denny Hamlin 5973, -599

NOTE: Drivers in italics are mathematically eliminated from winning the championship.

==== Race 10 - 2007 Ford 400 ====
Finishing order

1. Matt Kenseth (1)
2. Kurt Busch (2)
3. Denny Hamlin (3)
4. Jeff Gordon (4)
5. Carl Edwards (5)
6. Martin Truex Jr. (6)
7. Jimmie Johnson (7)
8. Jeff Burton (8)
9. Kevin Harvick (19)
10. Kyle Busch (20)
11. Tony Stewart (30)
12. Clint Bowyer (39)

Final standings:

1. Jimmie Johnson, 6,723 pts, 2007 Series Champion
2. Jeff Gordon, -77 pts
3. Clint Bowyer, -346 pts
4. Matt Kenseth, -425 pts
5. Kyle Busch, -430 pts
6. Tony Stewart, -481 pts
7. Kurt Busch, -492 pts*
8. Jeff Burton, -492 pts
9. Carl Edwards, -501 pts
10. Kevin Harvick, -524 pts
11. Martin Truex Jr., -559 pts
12. Denny Hamlin, -580 pts

* - Kurt Busch finished one place ahead of Jeff Burton based on most wins (Two wins vs. one).

== Television ==
ABC carried the entire Chase for the Nextel Cup in 2007, marking the first time that the entire Chase was carried on network television. (In previous years, it had been on a combination of NBC and TNT.) The commentators for ABC were Jerry Punch and Rusty Wallace, who are joined by newcomer Andy Petree, a former team owner and Dale Earnhardt's crew chief in 1993 and 1994. The hosts were Brent Musburger (race) and Suzy Kolber (studio).

== See also ==
- 2007 NASCAR Nextel Cup Series
- 2007 NASCAR Busch Series
- 2007 NASCAR Craftsman Truck Series

== External links and sources ==
- Official NASCAR site
- RacingOne
- Jayski's Silly Season Site
- Speed Channel
- ThatsRacin.com
- RacinFreek.com hosted by Freewebs.com

Preceded by 2006 Chase for the Nextel Cup	NASCAR seasons 2007	Succeeded by 2008 Chase for the Sprint Cup
