= May 2007 in sports =

| << | May 2007 | | | | | >> |
| Su | Mo | Tu | We | Th | Fr | Sa |
| | | 1 | 2 | 3 | 4 | 5 |
| 6 | 7 | 8 | 9 | 10 | 11 | 12 |
| 13 | 14 | 15 | 16 | 17 | 18 | 19 |
| 20 | 21 | 22 | 23 | 24 | 25 | 26 |
| 27 | 28 | 29 | 30 | 31 |
India; Sports

This list shows notable sports-related deaths, events, and notable outcomes that occurred in May of 2007.

== Deaths ==
- 30: Dave Balon
- 28: Marquise Hill
- 27: Percy Sonn
- 7: Diego Corrales
- 5: Jeremy Williams

== Sporting seasons ==
- Auto racing 2007:
  - Formula One
  - Champ Car
  - NASCAR NEXTEL Cup
  - NASCAR Busch Series
  - NASCAR Craftsman Truck Series
  - World Rally Championship
  - IRL
  - GP2
  - V8 Supercar
  - Rolex Sports Car Series
  - American Le Mans Series
  - FIA GT
  - Le Mans Series
- Baseball 2007
  - Chinese Professional Baseball League (Taiwan)
  - Major League Baseball
- Basketball 2007:
  - National Basketball Association
    - NBA playoffs
  - PBA Fiesta Conference
- Cricket 2007:
  - England
- Cycling
  - UCI ProTour
- Football (soccer) 2006–07:
  - England (general)
  - Scotland (general)
  - Argentina
- Golf:
  - 2007 PGA Tour
  - 2007 European Tour
  - 2007 LPGA Tour
- Ice hockey 2006–07:
  - National Hockey League
    - Stanley Cup playoffs
- Lacrosse 2007:
  - Major League Lacrosse
- Motorcycle racing 2007:
  - Motorcycle GP
- Rugby league 2007:
  - Super League XII
- Rugby union 2007:
  - 2006–07 TOP 14
  - 2006–07 IRB Sevens
- Shooting 2007:
  - 2007 ISSF World Cup
- Speedway:
  - Speedway Grand Prix
- Volleyball 2007:
  - 2006–07 CEV Champions League
  - 2006–07 CEV Women's Champions League

== 31 May 2007 (Thursday) ==
- Basketball:
  - Florida Gators head coach Billy Donovan has accepted a five-year, $27.5-million contract to become the head coach of the Orlando Magic. In doing so, he turns down a seven-year extension with unknown terms rumored to range from $3–$3.75m per year from the Gators. (Orlando Sentinel) (ESPN.com)
  - NBA Playoffs: Eastern Conference Finals:
    - Cleveland Cavaliers 109, Detroit Pistons 107, 2OT, Cleveland leads series 3–2
    In one of the most-impressive performances in playoff history, LeBron James scores 29 of the 30 points the Cavs score in the game's last 16 minutes. He finishes with 48 points, including a game-winning layup with 2.2 seconds left in the second overtime to win the game. (AP via Yahoo)
- American football:
  - A group of investors, including dot-com billionaire and NBA team owner Mark Cuban, announces that they are exploring the possibility of creating a professional Football league that would compete with the National Football League. Among the few details are the intention to play on Fridays, and a preliminary designation for the league of "UFL". There are no details on when they would begin play. (ESPN.com)
- Cricket:
  - 2007 ICC World Cricket League Division Three
    - Semifinals
      - Argentina 103/6 (34.2 ov.) beat Cayman Islands 102 (39.3 ov.) by 4 wickets
      - Uganda 204/9 (49.2 ov.) beat Papua New Guinea 203/6 (50 ov.) by 1 wicket
    - Plate Semifinals
      - Tanzania 195 (50 ov.) beat Fiji 127 (48.2 ov.) by 26 runs
      - Italy 146 (45 ov.) beat Hong Kong 195 (50 ov.) by 49 runs

== 30 May 2007 (Wednesday) ==
- Ice hockey:
  - Stanley Cup playoffs: Stanley Cup Finals:
    - Anaheim Ducks 1, Ottawa Senators 0. Anaheim leads series 2–0
    Samuel Påhlsson scores the game's only goal with 5:44 left in regulation. The Senators manage only 16 shots on goal.
- Basketball:
  - NBA Playoffs: Western Conference Finals:
    - San Antonio Spurs 109, Utah Jazz 84, San Antonio wins series 4–1
- Cricket:
  - 2007 ICC World Cricket League Division Three
    - Papua New Guinea 135/2 (33.1 ov.) beat Italy 134/9 (50 ov.) by 8 wickets
    - Argentina 46/0 (5 ov.) beat Fiji 44 (21.2 ov.) by 10 wickets
    - Uganda 153 (48.3 ov.) beat Cayman Islands 127 (48.2 ov.) by 26 runs
    - Tanzania 165/5 (46.1 ov.) beat Hong Kong 161 (47.2) by 5 wickets

== 29 May 2007 (Tuesday) ==
- Cricket:
  - West Indian cricket team in England in 2007
    - 2nd Test-5th Day: West Indies vs. England
- Basketball:
  - NBA Playoffs: Eastern Conference Finals:
    - Cleveland Cavaliers 91, Detroit Pistons 87, Series tied, 2–2.
    The Cavs overcome another disastrous third quarter thanks to LeBron James, who scores 14 of his 25 points in the final period.

== 28 May 2007 (Monday) ==
- Cricket:
  - West Indian cricket team in England in 2007
    - 2nd Test-4th Day: England 570/7 (dec) beat West Indies 146 & 141 (42.1 ov.) by an innings and 283 runs.
    This is West Indies's heaviest test defeat. The previous heaviest was an innings and 237 runs. England leads series 1–0
  - 2007 ICC World Cricket League Division Three
    - Argentina 92/5 beat Papua New Guinea 91 by 5 wickets
    - Italy 186/9 beat Fiji 149 by 37 runs
    - Uganda 70/6 beat Tanzania 64 by 4 wickets
    - Cayman Islands 70/2 beat Hong Kong 67 by 8 wickets
    - Cayman Islands and Uganda qualify for the Semifinals. Tanzania and Hong Kong are eliminated.
- Football (soccer):
  - English Championship League playoff final:
    - Derby County secure the final promotion place to the Premier League for the 2007–08 season by beating West Bromwich Albion 1–0.
- Ice hockey:
  - Stanley Cup playoffs: Stanley Cup Finals:
    - Anaheim Ducks 3, Ottawa Senators 2, Anaheim leads series 1–0
- Basketball:
  - NBA Playoffs: Western Conference Finals:
    - San Antonio Spurs 91, Utah Jazz 79, San Antonio leads series 3–1
  - Southeast Asia Basketball Association Championship at Ratchaburi, Thailand:
    - Philippines emerge on the top of the leaderboard as they qualify for the upcoming 2007 FIBA Asia Championship at Tokushima, Japan. Indonesia, by virtue of second place, qualifies too.
- NFL Football
  - New England Patriots defensive end Marquise Hill is found dead after a personal watercraft accident on Lake Pontchartrain the previous night. A woman that was on his watercraft with him was rescued, but Hill disappeared during the initial rescue attempt. Neither were wearing a life vest. The cause of death was ruled an accidental drowning, as drugs and alcohol were not found in his system during his autopsy.

== 27 May 2007 (Sunday) ==
- Auto racing:
  - Formula One: Monaco Grand Prix in Monte Carlo, Monaco.
  (1) Fernando Alonso (Spain) (2) Lewis Hamilton (United Kingdom) (3) Felipe Massa (Brazil)
  - IRL: The Indianapolis 500 in Speedway, Indiana
  (1) Dario Franchitti (United Kingdom) (2) Scott Dixon (New Zealand) (3) Hélio Castroneves (Brazil)
  - NASCAR NEXTEL Cup: The Coca-Cola 600 in Concord, North Carolina
  (1) Casey Mears (2) J. J. Yeley (3) Kyle Petty
- Basketball:
  - NBA Playoffs: Eastern Conference Finals:
    - Cleveland Cavaliers 88, Detroit Pistons 82, Detroit leads series, 2–1.
    LeBron James scores 32 points, including a late three-pointer that all but ices the game.
- Cricket:
  - Indian cricket team in Bangladesh in 2007
    - 2nd Test-3rd Day: India 610/3 (dec) beat Bangladesh 118 & 253 (57.3 ov.) by an innings and 239 runs India win series 1–0
  - West Indian cricket team in England in 2007
    - 2nd Test-3rd Day: England 570/7 (dec) lead West Indies 146 & 22/2 (9 ov.) by 402 runs. Rain prevented play on Day Three.
  - 2007 ICC World Cricket League Division Three
    - Italy 175/9 (50 ov.) beat Argentina 174 (50 ov.) by 1 run
    - Papua New Guinea 142/9 (49.5 ov.) beat Fiji 138 by 1 wicket
    - Cayman Islands 210/0 (45.4 ov.) beat Tanzania 206/6 (50 ov.) by 10 wickets
    - Uganda 219/5 (50 ov.) beat Hong Kong 129 (36.5 ov.) by 90 runs
  - International Cricket Council president Percy Sonn dies at age 57 in Cape Town, South Africa after complications from colon cancer.
- Football (soccer):
  - FIFA rules that no future international matches may be played at an altitude of over 2,500 metres (8,200 ft). (FIFA)

== 26 May 2007 (Saturday) ==
- Lacrosse:
  - The Duke lacrosse team beats Cornell, 12–11, to advance to Monday's NCAA Division I championship. The Blue Devils will play Johns Hopkins, who defeated Delaware, 8–3.
- Mixed martial arts:
  - UFC 71: Quinton "Rampage" Jackson defeats "The Iceman" Chuck Liddell to win the Ultimate Fighting Championship Light Heavyweight Title by KO (punches) at 1:53 of the first round.
- Cricket:
  - Indian cricket team in Bangladesh in 2007
    - 2nd Test-2nd Day: India 610/3 (dec) lead Bangladesh 58/5 (16 ov.) by 552 runs
  - West Indian cricket team in England in 2007
    - 2nd Test-2nd Day: England 570/7 (dec) lead West Indies 146 & 22/2 (9 ov.) by 402 runs
- Basketball:
  - NBA Playoffs: Western Conference Finals:
    - Utah Jazz 109, San Antonio Spurs 83, San Antonio leads series, 2–1
- Rugby union:
  - Internationals:
    - South Africa 58–10 England at Vodacom Park, Bloemfontein – The Springboks manhandle a depleted England side missing over 30 front-line players due to injuries, illness and club commitments. This is the largest Springboks win in the history of the series. (BBC)
    - Australia 29–23 Wales at Telstra Stadium, Sydney – Wallabies substitute Stephen Hoiles scores a try after the siren to deny Wales their first win on Australian soil since 1969. (BBC)
    - Argentina 22–20 Ireland at Estadio B. G. Estanislao López, Santa Fe – Felipe Contepomi gives Los Pumas the win with a last-minute drop goal, denying Ireland their first-ever win in Argentina. (BBC)
  - 2007 IRB Pacific Nations Cup:
    - Fiji 30–15 Japan
  - 2006–07 Top 14 season:
    - Stade Français Paris finish at the top of the standings, with Toulouse, ASM Clermont Auvergne and Biarritz Olympique making the semi-finals.

== 25 May 2007 (Friday) ==
- Cricket:
  - Indian cricket team in Bangladesh in 2007
    - 2nd Test-1st Day: India 326/0 (90 ov.) lead Bangladesh by 326 runs
  - West Indian cricket team in England in 2007
    - 2nd Test-1st Day: England 366/5 (85 ov.) lead West Indies by 366 runs
- Cycling:
  - Bjarne Riis, winner of the 1996 Tour de France, admits to having used the banned drugs EPO, cortisone, and growth hormone from 1993 to 1998. The current general manager of Team CSC offered to give back his Tour de France crown. (BBC)
- NHL:
  - Former NHL player Rick Tocchet, currently on leave as an assistant coach with the Phoenix Coyotes, pleads guilty in a New Jersey court to charges stemming from his running of a sports betting ring. State authorities have not indicated whether they will seek jail time for Tocchet. (AP via ESPN)

== 24 May 2007 (Thursday) ==
- Basketball:
  - NBA Playoffs: Eastern Conference Finals: Detroit Pistons 79, Cleveland Cavaliers 76, Detroit leads series, 2–0
    - Criticized for passing up a potential game-winning shot in Game 1, LeBron James misses a would-be go-ahead shot in the final seconds of Game 2. Larry Hughes gets the rebound but misses an open 10-foot jumper.

== 23 May 2007 (Wednesday) ==
- Football (soccer):
  - 2006–07 UEFA Champions League Final at Olympic Stadium, Athens.
    - (England) Liverpool 1–2 (Italy) A.C. Milan: Filippo Inzaghi scores both of his team's goals as Milan win their seventh European Cup (AP via Yahoo), and advance to 2007 FIFA Club World Cup.
- Rugby league:
  - 2007 Rugby League State of Origin series, Game 1 – Suncorp Stadium, Brisbane
    - Queensland 25 – 18 New South Wales, Queensland leads series, 1–0
- Cricket:
  - 2006 ICC Intercontinental Cup Final:
    - Ireland 352 beat Canada 92 & 145 (36.5 ov.) by an innings and 115 runs

== 22 May 2007 (Tuesday) ==
- Basketball:
  - NBA Playoffs: Western Conference Finals:
    - San Antonio Spurs 105, Utah Jazz 96, San Antonio leads series, 2–0
  - 2007 NBA draft Lottery: The Portland Trail Blazers win the first overall pick; the Seattle SuperSonics settle for the second overall pick. The Atlanta Hawks, Memphis Grizzlies, Boston Celtics and Milwaukee Bucks round out the first six picks.
- Cricket:
  - Indian cricket team in Bangladesh in 2007
    - 1st Test-5th Day: India 387/8 (dec) & 100/6 (dec) drew Bangladesh 238 & 104/2 (28 ov.) Series tied 0–0
  - 2007 Abu Dhabi Series
    - 3rd ODI: Sri Lanka 296/9 (50 ov.) beat Pakistan 181 (42.5 ov.) by 115 runs Pakistan win series 2–1
- Ice hockey:
  - Stanley Cup playoffs: Western Conference Finals:
    - Anaheim Ducks 4, Detroit Red Wings 3, Anaheim wins series 4–2
- American football
  - The NFL names Arlington, Texas as the host city for Super Bowl XLV in the year 2011, beating out Indianapolis, Indiana and Glendale, Arizona.

== 21 May 2007 (Monday) ==
- Basketball
  - 2007 NBA Playoffs: Eastern Conference finals:
    - Detroit Pistons 79, Cleveland Cavaliers 76, Detroit leads series, 1–0
- Cricket:
  - Indian cricket team in Bangladesh in 2007
    - 1st Test-4th Day: India 387/8 (dec) & 44/2 (14 ov.) lead Bangladesh 238 by 193 runs
  - West Indian cricket team in England in 2007
    - 1st Test-5th Day: England 553/5 (dec) & 284/8 (dec) drew West Indies 437 & 89/0 (22 ov.) Series tied at 0–0

== 20 May 2007 (Sunday) ==
- Basketball:
  - NBA Playoffs: Western Conference Finals:
    - San Antonio Spurs 108, Utah Jazz 100, San Antonio leads series, 1–0
  - FIBA Asia Champions Cup 2007 Semifinals at Tehran, Iran:
    - Final: (Iran) Saba Battery 84, (Syria) Al Jalaa 75
    Saba raced ahead in the first quarter but Al Jalaa trimmed down the lead until the third quarter when another Saba run gave the game out of reach. Saba won its first championship at home as Al Jalaa was beaten in the final for the second consecutive year..
    - Third-place: (Qatar) Al Rayyan 95, (Philippines) San Miguel 75
    In the first tournament of a Philippine team in Asian competition, San Miguel finished fourth as the Qataris lead from start to finish to win their second consecutive third-place finish.
- Cricket:
  - Indian cricket team in Bangladesh in 2007
    - 1st Test-3rd Day: India 384/6 (97 ov.) lead Bangladesh by 384 runs. day washed out due to rain
  - West Indian cricket team in England in 2007
    - 1st Test-4th Day: England 553/5 (dec) & 284/8 (dec) lead West Indies 437 & 7/0 (2 ov.) by 394 runs
  - 2007 Abu Dhabi Series
    - 2nd ODI: Pakistan 313/9 (50 0v.) beat Sri Lanka 215 (39.5 ov.) by 98 runs Pakistan lead series 2–0
- Lacrosse
  - World Indoor Lacrosse Championships in Halifax, Nova Scotia, Canada
    - Bronze medal match: United States defeats England 17–10
    - Gold medal match: Canada defeats Iroquois 15–14 in OT
- Ice hockey:
  - Stanley Cup playoffs: Conference Finals:
    - Anaheim Ducks 2, Detroit Red Wings 1, OT, Anaheim leads series, 3–2
- Rugby union:
  - Heineken Cup Final @ Twickenham, London.
    - (England) Leicester Tigers 9–25 London Wasps (England)
    The Tigers, winners of this season's Guinness Premiership and EDF Energy Cup, are denied a treble.

== 19 May 2007 (Saturday) ==
- Auto racing:
  - NASCAR NEXTEL Cup: The NEXTEL All-Star Challenge at Concord, North Carolina
  (1) Kevin Harvick (2) Jimmie Johnson (3) Mark Martin
- Lacrosse
  - World Indoor Lacrosse Championships in Halifax, Nova Scotia, Canada
    - Fifth Place match: Scotland defeats Australia 14–8
    - Semi-final match 1: Iroquois defeats United States 14–4
    - Semi-final match 2: Canada defeats England 24–8
- Cricket:
  - Indian cricket team in Bangladesh in 2007
    - 1st Test-2nd Day: India 384/6 (97 ov.) lead Bangladesh by 384 runs
  - West Indian cricket team in England in 2007
    - 1st Test-3rd Day: West Indies 363/7 (98 ov.) trail England 553/5d (142 overs) by 190 runs
- Basketball:
  - FIBA Asia Champions Cup 2007 Semifinals at Tehran, Iran:
    - (Syria) Al Jalaa 109, (Philippines) San Miguel 77
    - (Iran) Saba Battery 76, (Qatar) Al Rayyan 71
- Football (soccer):
  - FA Cup Final 2007:
    - At the newly redesigned Wembley Stadium in Wembley, North London, Chelsea F.C. beat Manchester United F.C. 1–0 in extra time after a 116th minute goal by Didier Drogba.
  - German Bundesliga 2006–07:
    - With a 2–1 home win over Energie Cottbus, VfB Stuttgart win their first Bundesliga title in 15 years.
  - Italian Serie B 2006–07:
    - Ten months after suffering a forced relegation as a result of the Serie A scandal, Juventus secure their return to Serie A with a 5–1 away win over Arezzo.
- Ice hockey:
  - Stanley Cup playoffs: Conference Finals:
    - Ottawa Senators 3, Buffalo Sabres 2, Ottawa wins series 4–1
- Rugby union:
  - Super 14 Final 2007
    - The Bulls become the first South African team to win the Super 14, defeating the Sharks with an 80th minute "after the hooter" try to Bryan Habana. Derick Hougaard kicked the following conversion to give the Bulls a 20–19 victory. (Reuters via stuff.co.nz)
- Horse racing:
  - Curlin wins the 132nd Preakness Stakes at Pimlico Race Course in Baltimore, Maryland, USA. Kentucky Derby winner Street Sense finishes second by a head. Thus, once again, horse racing's longest losing streak is extended to 29 years since Affirmed became the last Triple Crown winner.

== 18 May 2007 (Friday) ==
- Basketball
  - 2007 NBA Playoffs
    - Cleveland Cavaliers 88, New Jersey Nets 72, Cleveland wins series 4–2
    - San Antonio Spurs 114, Phoenix Suns 106, San Antonio wins series 4–2
  - The Houston Rockets fire head coach Jeff Van Gundy. (AP via Yahoo)
  - FIBA Asia Champions Cup 2007 Quarterfinals at Tehran, Iran:
    - (Philippines) San Miguel 95, (Lebanon) Blue Stars 81
    - (Qatar) Al Rayyan 86, (Kazakhstan) Astana Tigers 75
    - (Syria) Al Jalaa 102, (India) Young Cagers 79
- Lacrosse
  - World Indoor Lacrosse Championships in Halifax, Nova Scotia, Canada
    - Seventh Place match: Czech Republic defeats Ireland 22–5
    - Quarterfinal match 1: England defeats Australia 15–11
    - Quarterfinal match 2: United States defeats Scotland 17–9
- Cricket:
  - Indian cricket team in Bangladesh in 2007
    - 1st Test-1st Day: India 295/3 (77 ov.) lead Bangladesh by 295 runs
  - West Indian cricket team in England in 2007
    - 1st Test-2nd Day: England 553/5 (142 ov.) lead West Indies by 553 runs
  - 2007 Abu Dhabi Series
    - 1st ODI: Pakistan 239/5 (42 ov.) beat Sri Lanka 235/9 (50 ov.) by 5 wickets. Pakistan lead series 1–0

== 17 May 2007 (Thursday) ==
- Ice hockey:
  - Stanley Cup playoffs: Conference Finals:
    - Anaheim Ducks 5, Detroit Red Wings 3, Series tied 2–2
- Cricket:
  - West Indian cricket team in England in 2007
    - 1st Test-1st Day: England 200/3 lead West Indies by 200 runs
- Basketball: 2007 NBA Playoffs
  - Conference Semifinals
    - Detroit Pistons 95, Chicago Bulls 85, Detroit wins series, 4–2

== 16 May 2007 (Wednesday) ==
- Basketball:
  - NBA conference semifinals:
    - New Jersey Nets 83, Cleveland Cavaliers 72, Cleveland leads series, 3–2
    - San Antonio Spurs 88, Phoenix Suns 85, San Antonio leads series, 3–2
- Baseball:
  - Major League Baseball owners approve the sale of the Atlanta Braves from Time Warner Inc. to Liberty Media Corp. (AP via Yahoo)
- Football (soccer):
  - 2006–07 UEFA Cup Final @ Hampden Park, Glasgow.
    - (Spain) Espanyol 2–2 Sevilla (Spain) (aet)
    Sevilla win 3–1 on penalties to become only the second club ever to win the UEFA Cup two years in succession.
- Ice hockey:
  - Stanley Cup playoffs: Conference Finals:
    - Buffalo Sabres 3, Ottawa Senators 2, Ottawa leads series 3–1

== 15 May 2007 (Tuesday) ==
- Basketball: 2007 NBA Playoffs
  - Conference Semifinals
    - Chicago Bulls 108, Detroit Pistons 92, Detroit leads series, 3–2
    - Golden State Warriors 87, Utah Jazz 100, Utah wins series 4–1
- Ice hockey:
  - Stanley Cup playoffs: Conference Finals:
    - Detroit Red Wings 5, Anaheim Ducks 0, Detroit leads series, 2–1
- Cricket:
  - Indian cricket team in Bangladesh in 2007
    - 3rd ODI: India vs. Bangladesh No result. Match rained out. India win series 2–0
  - Australian cricket team in Zimbabwe 2007
    - Tour cancelled because the Australian government had security fears. The possibility of playing on a neutral venue was also destroyed, this time by the Mugabe regime.
- Major League Baseball
  - The Tampa Bay Devil Rays begin a series at The Ballpark at Disney's Wide World of Sports Complex outside Orlando, Florida, hosting the Texas Rangers. It is the first time that regular-season Major League baseball has been played in the Orlando area.

== 14 May 2007 (Monday) ==
- Ice hockey:
  - Stanley Cup playoffs: Conference Finals:
    - Ottawa Senators 1, Buffalo Sabres 0, Ottawa leads series, 3–0
- Basketball: 2007 NBA Playoffs
  - Conference Semifinals:
    - Cleveland Cavaliers 87, New Jersey Nets 85, Cleveland leads series, 3–1
    - Phoenix Suns 104, San Antonio Spurs 98, Phoenix ties series, 2–2

== 13 May 2007 (Sunday) ==
- Baseball:
  - Rookie Fred Lewis of the San Francisco Giants hits for the cycle in the Giants' 15–2 win over the Colorado Rockies.
- Auto racing:
  - Formula One: Spanish Grand Prix in Barcelona, Spain.
  (1) Felipe Massa (Brazil) (2) Lewis Hamilton (United Kingdom) (3) Fernando Alonso (Spain)
  - NASCAR NEXTEL Cup: The Dodge Avenger 500 at Darlington, South Carolina (postponed from May 12 due to rain)
  (1) Jeff Gordon (2) Denny Hamlin (3) Jimmie Johnson
- Basketball: 2007 NBA Playoffs
  - Conference Semifinals
    - Chicago Bulls 102, Detroit Pistons 87, Detroit leads series, 3–1
    - Utah Jazz 115, Golden State Warriors 101, Utah leads series 3–1
- Football (soccer):
  - Last day of the English Premiership Season 2006–07
    - Manchester United finish on top with 89 points.
    - Sheffield United, Charlton Athletic and Watford are all relegated to the Championship.
    - Birmingham City and Sunderland will join the Premiership next season after being promoted from the Championship.
    - One other team will be promoted to the Premiership out of Derby County, Southampton, West Bromwich Albion or Wolverhampton Wanderers. This will be determined by the final Championship playoff on 28 May.
- Ice hockey:
  - Stanley Cup playoffs: Conference Finals:
    - Anaheim Ducks 4, Detroit Red Wings 3, OT, Series tied 1–1
  - 2007 IIHF World Championship:
    - Canada 4, Finland 2: The Canadians go up 3–0 on power play goals by tournament MVP Rick Nash and Eric Staal and an equal-strength goal from Colby Armstrong. The Finns mount a comeback attempt in the third that ends in an empty-net clincher by Nash. (Official score sheet)

== 12 May 2007 (Saturday) ==
- Lacrosse
  - National Lacrosse League Champion's Cup at the Jobing.com Arena in Glendale, Arizona, USA:
    - Rochester Knighthawks beat Arizona Sting, 13–11, capturing the Cup, and finishing with a combined regular season and playoff record of 17–2. John Grant Jr. was awarded Champion's Cup MVP. Including the championship game, the Knighthawks have won 15 straight games.
- Auto racing:
  - IRL: Hélio Castroneves wins pole position for the 2007 Indianapolis 500.
- Basketball: 2007 NBA Playoffs
  - Conference Semifinals:
    - New Jersey Nets 96, Cleveland Cavaliers 85, Cleveland leads series, 2–1
    - San Antonio Spurs 108, Phoenix Suns 101, San Antonio leads series, 2–1
- Ice hockey:
  - Stanley Cup playoffs: Conference Finals:
    - Ottawa Senators 4, Buffalo Sabres, 3, 2OT, Ottawa leads series, 2–0
- Cricket:
  - Indian cricket team in Bangladesh in 2007
    - 2nd ODI: India 284/8 (49/49 ov.) beat Bangladesh 238/9 (49/49 ov.) 46 runs. India win series 2–0

== 11 May 2007 (Friday) ==
- Basketball: 2007 NBA Playoffs
  - Conference Semifinals
    - Golden State Warriors 125, Utah Jazz 105, Utah leads series, 2–1
- Ice hockey:
  - Stanley Cup playoffs: Conference Finals:
    - Detroit Red Wings 2, Anaheim Ducks 1, Detroit leads series 1–0

== 10 May 2007 (Thursday) ==
- Basketball:
  - 2007 NBA Playoffs Conference Semifinals
    - Detroit Pistons 81, Chicago Bulls 74, Detroit leads series, 3–0
  - ESPN reports that Dirk Nowitzki of the Dallas Mavericks will be announced as NBA MVP on May 15. (ESPN)
- Auto racing:
  - NASCAR driver Dale Earnhardt Jr. announces that he will be leaving DEI, the team founded by his late father, at the end of the 2007 season. AP via Yahoo!
- Ice hockey:
  - Stanley Cup playoffs: Conference Finals:
    - Ottawa Senators 5, Buffalo Sabres 2, Ottawa leads series 1–0
- Cricket:
  - Indian cricket team in Bangladesh in 2007
    - 1st ODI:India 251/5 (46/47 ov.) beat Bangladesh 250/7 (47/47 ov.) by 5 wickets. India lead series 1–0

== 9 May 2007 (Wednesday) ==
- Basketball: 2007 NBA Playoffs
  - Conference Semifinals
    - Utah Jazz 127, Golden State Warriors 117, Jazz lead series, 2–0

== 8 May 2007 (Tuesday) ==
- Basketball: 2007 NBA Playoffs
  - Conference Semifinals
    - Cleveland Cavaliers 102, New Jersey Nets 92. Cavaliers lead series, 2–0
    - Phoenix Suns 101, San Antonio Spurs 81. Series tied, 1–1
- Snooker:
  - 2007 World Snooker Championship at The Crucible Theatre in Sheffield, England:
    - In the early hours of the morning (local time), at the end of the latest finish for a World Championship final at The Crucible, Scotland's John Higgins beats England's Mark Selby 18–13 to claim the title for his second time. The match winner won £220,000, the loser, £110,000.

== 7 May 2007 (Monday) ==
- Basketball:
  - NBA Playoffs: Conference Semifinals:
    - Detroit Pistons 108, Chicago Bulls 87. Pistons lead series, 2–0
    - Utah Jazz 116, Golden State Warriors 112. Jazz lead series, 1–0
- Ice hockey:
  - Stanley Cup playoffs: Conference Semi Finals:
    - Detroit Red Wings 2, San Jose Sharks 0, Detroit wins series 4–2
- Snooker:
  - Day 2 of 2 of final of the 2007 World Snooker Championship at The Crucible Theatre in Sheffield, England:
    - In one of the most dramatic World Championship finals ever, Mark Selby makes an amazing fightback against John Higgins, starting the day behind by 12 frames to 4, getting back to 14–13 in the first-to-18-frames match as the match proceeds past midnight.

== 6 May 2007 (Sunday) ==
- Baseball:
  - Roger Clemens signs with the New York Yankees, for whom he played from 1999 to 2003. The one-year contract will pay him about $18.5 million, a pro-rated sum. (AP via Yahoo)
- Auto racing:
  - NASCAR NEXTEL Cup: Jim Stewart 400 at Richmond, Virginia (postponed from May 5 due to rain)
  (1) Jimmie Johnson (2) Kyle Busch (3) Denny Hamlin
- Basketball:
  - Euroleague Final Four at Olympic Indoor Hall, Athens:
    - Championship: (Greece) Panathinaikos 93–91 CSKA Moscow (Russia) – The Greens, playing at home, have six players score in double figures, and hold on to dethrone the defending champions. (Euroleague)
    - Third place: (Spain) TAU Cerámica 74–76 Unicaja Málaga (Spain) – In an all-Spanish affair, the Andalusians come back from a 10-point deficit entering the final quarter, beating the Basques on a layup by Marcus Brown with 1.2 seconds left. (Euroleague)
  - 2007 NBA Playoffs Conference Semifinals:
    - New Jersey Nets 77, Cleveland Cavaliers 81, Cavaliers lead series 1–0
    - San Antonio Spurs 111, Phoenix Suns 106, Spurs lead series 1–0
- Football (soccer):
  - FA Premier League: Manchester United win the Premiership title for 2007 after rival contenders Chelsea and Arsenal draw 1–1. (BBC)
- Ice hockey:
  - Stanley Cup playoffs: Conference Semi Finals:
    - Buffalo Sabres 5, New York Rangers 4, Sabres win series 4–2
- Snooker:
  - Day 1 of 2 of final of the 2007 World Snooker Championship at The Crucible Theatre in Sheffield, England:
    - John Higgins leads Mark Selby by 12 frames to 4 with 19 frames still to play.

== 5 May 2007 (Saturday) ==
- Basketball:
  - NBA Playoffs:
    - Conference Semifinals: Detroit Pistons 95, Chicago Bulls 69. Pistons lead series, 1–0
    - First Round: Utah Jazz 103, Houston Rockets 99. Jazz win series, 4–3
- Boxing: "The World Awaits" pay-per-view at the MGM Grand Garden Arena, Las Vegas, Nevada:
  - (United States) Floyd Mayweather Jr. beats (United States) Oscar De La Hoya to win the World Boxing Council super-welterweight title via split decision. Mayweather remained unbeaten.
  - (Philippines) Rey Bautista beat (Argentina) Sergio Manuel Medina via unanimous decision.
- Horse racing:
  - Street Sense wins the 2007 Kentucky Derby at Churchill Downs in Louisville, Kentucky USA
- Ice hockey:
  - Stanley Cup playoffs: Conference Semi Finals:
    - Ottawa Senators 3, New Jersey Devils 2. Senators win series 4–1
    - Detroit Red Wings 4, San Jose Sharks 1. Red Wings lead series 3–2

== 4 May 2007 (Friday) ==
- Basketball:
  - Euroleague semifinals at Olympic Indoor Hall, Athens:
    - (Russia) CSKA Moscow 62–50 Unicaja Málaga (Spain) – The defending champions break open a tight defensive struggle with a 14–0 run in the fourth quarter. (Euroleague)
    - (Greece) Panathinaikos 67–53 TAU Cerámica (Spain) – Playing on their home floor, the Greens send a partisan crowd home happy, while leaving the Basque side trophy-less in their third consecutive Final Four trip. (Euroleague)
  - NBA Playoffs First Round:
    - New Jersey Nets 98, Toronto Raptors 97, Nets win series 4–2
- Ice hockey
  - Stanley Cup playoffs: Conference Semi Finals:
    - Buffalo Sabres 2, New York Rangers 1, OT. Sabres lead series 3–2
- Football (soccer):
  - The Football League: Leeds United A.F.C. are placed into Administration and purchased by Leeds United Football Club Limited, controversially chaired by Ken Bates. Leeds United automatically suffer a 10-point deduction for going into Administration, ensuring their relegation to Football League 1 next season. History of Leeds United A.F.C.

== 3 May 2007 (Thursday) ==
- Basketball:
  - NCAA: The men's basketball rules committee of the National Collegiate Athletic Association votes to move the three-point line back 1 foot to 20 feet, 9 inches. If approved by the rules oversight committee on May 25, the change will go into effect in the 2008–09 season. Women's basketball will continue to use the 19'9" line. (AP via Yahoo)
  - NBA Playoffs: First Round:
    - Golden State Warriors 111, Dallas Mavericks 86, Warriors win series 4–2.
    - The Warriors become the first #8 seed to beat a #1 seed in an NBA best-of-seven series.
- Football (soccer):
  - 2006–07 UEFA Cup Semi-finals, second leg.
    - (Germany) Werder Bremen 1–2 Espanyol (Spain) (first leg: 0–3) (aggregate score 1–5)
    - (Spain) Sevilla 2–0 Osasuna (Spain) (first leg: 0–1) (aggregate score 2–1).
- Ice hockey
  - Stanley Cup playoffs: Conference Semi Finals:
    - Anaheim Ducks 2, Vancouver Canucks 1, 2OT, Ducks wins series 4–1

== 2 May 2007 (Wednesday) ==
- Tennis:
  - At Palma de Mallorca, Rafael Nadal defeats Roger Federer, 7–5, 4–6, 7–6 (10), on a specially designed tennis court, half grass and half clay.
- Football (soccer):
  - 2006–07 UEFA Champions League Semi Finals, second leg.
    - (Italy) A.C. Milan 3–0 Manchester United (England) (aggregate score 5–3)
- Ice hockey:
  - Stanley Cup playoffs: Conference Semi Finals:
    - Ottawa Senators 3, New Jersey Devils 2, Senators lead series 3–1
    - Detroit Red Wings 3, San Jose Sharks 2 OT, Series tied 2–2
- Basketball:
  - NBA Playoffs: First Round:
    - San Antonio Spurs 93, Denver Nuggets 78, Spurs win series 4–1
    - Phoenix Suns 119, Los Angeles Lakers 110, Suns win series 4–1
    - After winning both of their Game 5s at home, the Suns and the Spurs will face each other at the Conference Semifinals.

== 1 May 2007 (Tuesday) ==
- Football (soccer):
  - 2006–07 UEFA Champions League Semi Finals, second leg.
    - (England) Liverpool 1–0 Chelsea (England) (aggregate score 1–1 after extra time)
    - Liverpool win 4–1 on penalties.
- Ice hockey
  - Stanley Cup playoffs: Conference Semi Finals:
    - New York Rangers 2, Buffalo Sabres 1, Series tied 2–2
    - Anaheim Ducks 3, Vancouver Canucks 2 OT, Ducks lead series 3–1
