= July 2007 in sports =

<<	July 2007					>>
Su	Mo	Tu	We	Th	Fr	Sa
1	2	3	4	5	6	7
8	9	10	11	12	13	14
15	16	17	18	19	20	21
22	23	24	25	26	27	28
29	30	31
India; Sports

This list shows notable sports-related deaths, events, and notable outcomes that occurred in July of 2007.

== Deaths ==
- 30: Bill Walsh
- 26: Skip Prosser
- 22: Mike Coolbaugh
- 22: Rollie Stiles
- 14: John Ferguson Sr.

== Sporting seasons ==
- Auto racing 2007:
  - Formula One
  - Champ Car
  - NASCAR NEXTEL Cup
  - NASCAR Busch Series
  - NASCAR Craftsman Truck Series
  - World Rally Championship
  - IRL
  - GP2
  - V8 Supercar
  - Rolex Sports Car Series
  - American Le Mans Series
  - FIA GT
  - Le Mans Series
  - Japan Le Mans Challenge
- Baseball 2007
  - Chinese Professional Baseball League (Taiwan)
  - Major League Baseball
- Basketball 2007:
  - NCAA Philippines
  - UAAP (Philippines)
- Canadian football:
  - Canadian Football League
- Cricket 2007:
  - England
- Cycling
  - UCI ProTour
- Football (soccer) 2006–07:
  - Argentina
  - Major League Soccer
- Golf:
  - 2007 PGA Tour
  - 2007 European Tour
  - 2007 LPGA Tour
- Lacrosse 2007:
  - Major League Lacrosse
- Motorcycle racing 2007:
  - Motorcycle GP
- Rugby league 2007:
  - Super League XII
- Shooting 2007:
  - 2007 ISSF World Cup
- Speedway:
  - Speedway Grand Prix

== Days of the month ==
=== 31 July 2007 (Tuesday) ===
- Baseball:
  - The Boston Red Sox acquire former Cy Young Award-winning pitcher Éric Gagné from the Texas Rangers in exchange for pitcher Kason Gabbard and two minor-league outfielders. (AP via Yahoo)
  - The Rangers also trade first baseman Mark Teixeira and pitcher Ron Mahay to the Atlanta Braves for rookie catcher Jarrod Saltalamacchia and four minor-leaguers. (AP via Yahoo)
- Basketball:
  - National Basketball Association:
    - The Boston Celtics trade seven players to the Minnesota Timberwolves for 10-time all-star Kevin Garnett. It is the first time in NBA history so many players have been traded for a single player. The Timberwolves will receive Al Jefferson, Ryan Gomes, Gerald Green, Sebastian Telfair, Theo Ratliff, and 2 first-round daft picks. (AP via Yahoo)

- FIBA Asia Championship quarterfinals at Tokushima, Japan:

- Group E: Iran 76–64 Chinese Taipei
- Group E: Lebanon 90–68 Qatar
- Group F: South Korea 70–65 Jordan
- Group F: Kazakhstan 93–85 Japan

- Cricket:
  - Indian cricket team in England in 2007
    - 2nd Test-5th Day:India 481 & 73/3 (24.1 ov.) England 198 & 355 beat by 7 wickets
      - India leads series 1–0.

=== 30 July 2007 (Monday) ===
- Basketball: FIBA Asia Championship at Tokushima, Japan:
  - Group A: Iran 77–68 China
  - Group A: Jordan 84–76 Philippines
    - Jordan advances to the quarterfinals.
  - Group B: Lebanon 105–64 United Arab Emirates
    - Lebanon advances to the quarterfinals.
  - Group B: Japan 101–48 Kuwait
  - Group C: India 72–66 Indonesia
  - Group C: Qatar 76–69 Kazakhstan
    - Qatar wins Group C.
  - Group D: Chinese Taipei 98–81 Hong Kong
    - Chinese Taipei advances to the quarterfinals.
  - Group D: South Korea 89–79 Syria
- American football
  - Head coach Bill Walsh, who led the San Francisco 49ers to three Super Bowls in 10 seasons in the 1980s and created the modern West Coast offense, dies after a battle with leukemia at his home in Stanford, California, at the age of 75. (ESPN)
- Cricket:
  - Indian cricket team in England in 2007
    - 2nd Test-4th Day:England 198 & 355 lead India 481 & 10/0 (3 ov.) by 63 runs

=== 29 July 2007 (Sunday) ===
- Baseball: July 29 – Cal Ripken Jr. and Tony Gwynn were inducted into the Baseball Hall of Fame.
- Auto racing:
  - NASCAR: Allstate 400 at The Brickyard in Speedway, Indiana.
  (1) Tony Stewart (2) Juan Pablo Montoya (Colombia) (3) Jeff Gordon
  - Champ Car: San Jose Grand Prix in San Jose, California, USA.
  (1) Robert Doornbos (Netherlands) (2) Neel Jani (Switzerland) (3) Oriol Servia (Spain)
- Cycling: 2007 Tour de France – Stage 20 – Marcoussis – Paris-Champs-Élysées (146 km)
  - Alberto Contador (Spain) (DSC) wins the Tour in 91 hours and 26 seconds, 23 seconds ahead of Cadel Evans (Australia) and 31 seconds ahead of Levi Leipheimer (United States) . This was Contador's first attempt at the Tour. (leTour.fr)
- Basketball: FIBA Asia Championship at Tokushima, Japan:
  - Group A: Philippines 79–74 China
    - China is eliminated from championship contention.
  - Group A: Iran 60–54 Jordan
  - Group B: United Arab Emirates 69–68 Kuwait – Rashid Alrabah's missed lay-up at the buzzer gave the game to UAE.
    - Kuwait is eliminated from championship contention.
  - Group B: Japan 77–67 Lebanon
  - Group C: Qatar 97–74 Indonesia
  - Group C: Kazakhstan 86–45 India
    - India and Indonesia are eliminated from championship contention.
    - Qatar and Kazakhstan advance to the quarterfinals.
  - Group D: Hong Kong 104–100 Syria – Yi Ting Lo's freethrow gave the game out of reach for the Syrians.
    - Syria is eliminated from championship contention.
  - Group D: South Korea 85–70 Chinese Taipei
- Football (soccer): 2007 AFC Asian Cup finals
  - Iraq 1–0 Saudi Arabia at Jakarta
- Cricket:
  - Indian cricket team in England in 2007
    - 2nd Test-3rd Day:India 481 lead England 198 & 43/0 (16 ov.) by 240 runs

=== 28 July 2007 (Saturday) ===
- Cycling: 2007 Tour de France – Stage 19 – Cognac – Angoulême (55 km) Individual time trial
  - (leTour.fr)
- Basketball: FIBA Asia Championship at Tokushima, Japan:
  - Group A: Jordan 78–65 China
  - Group A: Iran 75–69 Philippines – in the only non-blowout game on the first day, the Philippines cut the Iranian lead from 16 to one point but a technical foul on Philippine coach Chot Reyes after the two-minute warning turned the tide in favor of the Iranians.
  - Group B: Japan 109–66 United Arab Emirates
  - Group B: Lebanon 104–59 Kuwait
  - Group C: Qatar 106–49 India
  - Group C: Kazakhstan 107–53 Indonesia
  - Group D: South Korea 107–67 Hong Kong
  - Group D: Chinese Taipei 99–60 Syria
- Cricket:
  - Indian cricket team in England in 2007
    - 2nd Test-2nd Day:India 254/3 (79 ov.) lead England 198 by 55 runs
- Football (soccer): 2007 AFC Asian Cup third-place match
  - South Korea 0–0 (aet) Japan at Palembang
    - South Korea won via penalties, 6–5.

=== 27 July 2007 (Friday) ===
- Baseball: Barry Bonds hits his 754th career home run in the first inning against the Florida Marlins at AT&T Park.
- Cycling: 2007 Tour de France – Stage 18 – Cahors – Angoulême (211 km)
  - (leTour.fr)
- Cricket:
  - Indian cricket team in England in 2007
    - 2nd Test-1st Day:England 169/7 (55 ov.) lead India by 169 runs

=== 26 July 2007 (Thursday) ===
- College basketball: Wake Forest men's head coach Skip Prosser dies of an apparent heart attack. (AP via Yahoo)
- Cricket: Former Indian fast bowler Javagal Srinath's name is not included in the ICC match referees list for the upcoming Twenty20 World Championship to be contested in South Africa
- Cycling: 2007 Tour de France – Stage 17 – Pau – Castelsarrasin (188 km)
  - (leTour.fr)

=== 25 July 2007 (Wednesday) ===
- Auto racing: NASCAR NEXTEL Cup team Robert Yates Racing announces it will merge operations with Champ Car stalwart Newman/Haas/Lanigan Racing.
- Cycling: 2007 Tour de France – Stage 16 – Orthez – Gourette–Col d'Aubisque (218 km)
  - Yellow jersey wearer Michael Rasmussen (Denmark) wins the stage. (leTour.fr) Shortly afterwards, his Rabobank team announces it has withdrawn him from the Tour for violation of team rules, linked to his prior failure to notify the team's directeur sportif of his whereabouts and missing several doping tests. He had been previously kicked off the Danish national cycling team for the same reason. (ESPN)
  - Italian rider Cristian Moreni is announced to have failed a doping test after Stage 11. At the end of Stage 16, he is led away for questioning by French police, who also conduct a raid on the hotel used that day by his Cofidis team. The team pulls out of the Tour.(Fox News)
- Football (soccer): 2007 AFC Asian Cup semifinals
  - Iraq 0–0 (aet) South Korea at Kuala Lumpur
    - Iraq won via penalties, 4–3.
  - Saudi Arabia 3–2 Japan at Hanoi
- Basketball: Philippine NCAA end of first round of eliminations:
  - Colegio de San Juan de Letran 70, San Beda College 69
  - José Rizal University 74, College of Saint Benilde 63
  - Both Letran and San Beda finished on top of the standings with 5–1 records; host JRU and San Sebastian College – Recoletos finished tied for third at 3–3. Trailing are Mapua and University of Perpetual Help with 2–4 records and St. Benilde with 1–5.
- Cricket:
  - Bangladesh cricket team in Sri Lanka in 2007
    - 3rd ODI:Sri Lanka 196 (39.5/40 ov.) beat Bangladesh 157 (37.1/40 ov.) by 39 runs

=== 24 July 2007 (Tuesday) ===
- Auto racing: NASCAR NEXTEL Cup teams DEI and Ginn Racing officially merge with the #01 team with Mark Martin, Regan Smith and Aric Almirola joining DEI and the points earned by the #13 car transferred to the DEI #15 team driven by Paul Menard.
- Basketball: NBA commissioner David Stern says the scandal involving former official Tim Donaghy is an isolated incident. (AP via Yahoo)
- Cycling: 2007 Tour de France:
  - On the final rest day, it was announced that XDS Astana Team has withdrawn their entire team after it was discovered that two-time stage winner Alexander Vinokourov (Kazakhstan) had been found guilty of blood doping after a test. (letour.fr)
- Baseball:
  - Houston Astros second baseman Craig Biggio, who had collected his 3,000th hit on June 28, announces that he will retire at the end of the 2007 MLB season. (MLB.com)

=== 23 July 2007 (Monday) ===
- Baseball: In his first game since being diagnosed with lymphoma last year, Boston Red Sox pitcher Jon Lester gives up two runs on five hits in six innings in Boston's 6–2 win over the Cleveland Indians. (Ticker via Yahoo)
- Cycling: 2007 Tour de France – Stage 15 – Foix – Loudenvielle (196 km)
  - (leTour.fr)
- American football: NFL commissioner Roger Goodell orders Atlanta Falcons quarterback Michael Vick not to report to training camp while he continues to face charges of illegal dog fighting and animal abuse. (AP via Yahoo)
- Cricket:
  - Indian cricket team in England in 2007
    - 1st Test-5th Day:England 298 & 282 drew India 201 & 282/9 (96 ov.)

=== 22 July 2007 (Sunday) ===
- Baseball: Mike Coolbaugh, first-base coach with the Tulsa Drillers of the Double-A Texas League, dies after getting hit in the head with a line drive at a game in North Little Rock, Arkansas. (AP via Yahoo)
- Auto racing:
  - Formula One: European Grand Prix at Nürburg, Germany.
  (1) Fernando Alonso (Spain) (2) Felipe Massa (Brazil) (3) Mark Webber (Australia)
  - IRL: Honda 200 at Troy Township, Morrow County, Ohio.
  (1) Scott Dixon (New Zealand) (2) Dario Franchitti (United Kingdom) (3) Hélio Castroneves (Brazil)
  - Champ Car: West Edmonton Mall Grand Prix in Edmonton, Alberta, Canada.
  (1) Sébastien Bourdais (France) (2) Justin Wilson (United Kingdom) (3) Graham Rahal (United States)
- Cycling: 2007 Tour de France – Stage 14 – Mazamet – Plateau-de-Beille (197 km)
  - (leTour.fr)
- Golf: 2007 Open Championship
  - Pádraig Harrington (Republic of Ireland) defeats Sergio García (Spain) in a four-hole playoff to win the Open Championship in Carnoustie, Scotland. Harrington becomes the first European-based player to win the claret jug since Paul Lawrie won in 1999, also in a playoff at Carnoustie Golf Links.
- Cricket:
  - Indian cricket team in England in 2007
    - 1st Test-4th Day:England 298 & 282 leads India 201 & 137/3 (41 ov.) by 243 runs
- Football (soccer): 2007 AFC Asian Cup quarterfinals
  - Iran 0–0 (aet) South Korea at Kuala Lumpur
    - South Korea won via penalties, 4–2.
  - Saudi Arabia 2–1 Uzbekistan at Jakarta
- Basketball: FIBA Under-19 World Championship at Serbia
  - Final: Serbia 74–69 United States
  - Third-place: France 75–67 Brazil
- English billiards: World Professional Billiards Championship in England:
  - Final: Mike Russell (England) 2166–1710 Chris Shutt (England)

=== 21 July 2007 (Saturday) ===
- Cycling: 2007 Tour de France – Stage 13 – Albi (54 km) Individual time trial
  - (leTour.fr)
- Rugby union:
  - 2007 Tri Nations
    - New Zealand 26–12 Australia at Eden Park, Auckland — Dan Carter's seven penalties lead the All Blacks to their third consecutive Tri Nations crown. They also retain the Bledisloe Cup.
- Cricket:
  - Indian cricket team in England in 2007
    - 1st Test-3rd Day:England 298 & 77/2 (27 ov.) leads India 201 by 174 runs
- Football (soccer): 2007 AFC Asian Cup quarterfinals
  - Japan 1–1 (aet) Australia at Hanoi
    - Japan won via penalties, 4–3.
  - Iraq 2–0 Vietnam at Bangkok

=== 20 July 2007 (Friday) ===
- Basketball:
  - The National Basketball Association acknowledges that the FBI is investigating whether referee Tim Donaghy bet on NBA games, including those he officiated.(AP via Yahoo!)
  - Philippine Basketball Association Fiesta Conference Finals at the Cuneta Astrodome, Pasay:
    - Alaska Aces 99, Talk 'N Text Phone Pals 96, Alaska wins series, 4–3
- Cycling: 2007 Tour de France – Stage 12 – Montpellier – Castres (179 km)
  - (leTour.fr)
- Cricket:
  - Indian cricket team in England in 2007
    - 1st Test-2nd Day:England 298 lead India 145/4 (57 ov.) by 153 runs
  - Bangladesh cricket team in Sri Lanka in 2007
    - Sri Lanka 234/6 (50 ov.) beat Bangladesh 164 (40.3 ov.) by 70 runs

=== 19 July 2007 (Thursday) ===
- Cycling: 2007 Tour de France – Stage 11 – Marseille – Montpellier (182.5 km)
  - (leTour.fr)
- Cricket:
  - Indian cricket team in England in 2007
    - 1st Test-1st Day:England 268/4 lead India by 268 runs
- Baseball:
  - Barry Bonds hits two home runs, but his San Francisco Giants lose to the Chicago Cubs, 9–8. The two home runs give Bonds 71 multi-home run games in his career, one behind the record of 72 hit by Babe Ruth, and gives him 753 home runs for his career, two behind the record of Henry Aaron. Bonds's season total of 19 home runs also surpasses the record of 18 home runs hit by Carlton Fisk in a year in which the player turned at least 43 years old. He is two home runs behind Fisk's record of 70 home runs hit by a player after he turned 40.
- Poker: 2007 World Series of Poker Main Event:
  - Jerry Yang defeats Tuan Lam in the final hand of the Main Event with a miracle Six of Hearts on the river to complete a five-through-nine straight and overcome Lam's pair of Queens to claim the $8.25 million (US) first prize.
- Cycling: 2007 Tour de France – Stage 10 – Tallard – Marseille (229 km)
  - (leTour.fr)

=== 17 July 2007 (Tuesday) ===
- Auto racing:
  - NASCAR NEXTEL Cup team Ginn Racing makes a major shakeup:
    - They release drivers Sterling Marlin and Joe Nemechek;
    - Closes down the shop for their #13 car due to a lack of sponsorship;
    - Announced Regan Smith will move into the #14 car for the rest of the 2007 season;
    - Sign former Joe Gibbs Racing driver Aric Almirola to drive part-time for the rest of the season with Mark Martin in the #01 car. Ginn Racing Press Release
- Cycling: 2007 Tour de France – Stage 9 – Val-d'Isère – Briançon (159.5 km)
  - (leTour.fr)
- National Football League
  - A federal grand jury indicts Atlanta Falcons quarterback Michael Vick and three other men on charges of running a dogfighting operation. (AP via Yahoo)
  - The Miami Dolphins release quarterback Daunte Culpepper. (AP via Yahoo)

=== 16 July 2007 (Monday) ===
- Cricket
  - Zimbabwe has been dropped out of the ICC Test Championship because they only played 8 Tests in the last 3 years. The annual update of the Test Championship that gets rid of all results that happened before the last three years to make the table reflect current form which usually happens every August 1 happened now because there are no Test Series to be completed ahead of that date. Revised Standings and Full Story

=== 15 July 2007 (Sunday) ===
- Football (soccer): 2007 Copa América final at Venezuela:
  - Brazil 3–0 Argentina at Maracaibo
- Auto racing:
  - IRL: Firestone Indy 200 at Gladeville, Tennessee (postponed from July 14).
  (1) Scott Dixon (New Zealand) (2) Dario Franchitti (United Kingdom) (3) Danica Patrick (United States)
  - NASCAR: USG Sheetrock 400 at Joliet, Illinois.
  (1) Tony Stewart (2) Matt Kenseth (3) Carl Edwards

Stewart breaks his 20-race losing streak with the win.

- Cycling: 2007 Tour de France – Stage 8 – Le Grand-Bornand – Tignes (165 km)
  - Michael Rasmussen (Rabobank) wins the stage in 4:49:40 and takes the lead both in the general classification and the mountains classification, finishing the stage ahead of Iban Mayo (Saunier Duval–Prodir) (+2'47") and Alejandro Valverde (Caisse d'Epargne). In the GC, Rasmussen leads in 39:37:42, 43 seconds ahead of Linus Gerdemann, 2'39" ahead of Mayo, and 2'51" ahead of Valverde. Rest day tomorrow. (leTour.fr)
- Basketball: Manila Invitational at the Araneta Coliseum, Quezon City
  - Final: Philippines 87–81 Lebanon
  - Third-place game: Syria 90–85 China
- American football
  - World Cup – Kawasaki, Japan:
    - Final: (United States) USA 23–20 Japan (OT)
- Cricket:
  - Quadrangular Series in Ireland in 2007
    - 6th ODI:Ireland 222/7 (50 ov.) beat Scotland 199 (49.3 ov.) by 23 runs
      - West Indies won the quadrangular series by 1 point.
- Baseball:
  - The Philadelphia Phillies become the first MLB franchise to lose 10,000 games, falling to the St. Louis Cardinals by a score of 10–2.

=== 14 July 2007 (Saturday) ===
- Football (soccer): 2007 Copa América third place match at Venezuela:
  - Mexico 3–1 Uruguay at Caracas
- Cycling: 2007 Tour de France – Stage 7 – Bourg-en-Bresse – Le Grand-Bornand (197 km)
  - In the first mountain stage of this year's tour, Linus Gerdemann (T-Mobile) wins the stage and becomes the new leader of the general classification with a stage time of 4:53:13, followed today by Iñigo Landaluze (Euskaltel–Euskadi) in +40" and David de la Fuente (Saunier Duval–Prodir) in +1'39". In the GC, Gerdemann leads in 34:43:40, ahead of Landaluze (+1'24") and de la Fuente (+2'45"). Previous leader Fabian Cancellara goes down to 108th place. (leTour.fr)
- Cricket:
  - Bangladesh cricket team in Sri Lanka in 2007
    - 3rd Test-4th Day: Sri Lanka 500/4 (dec) beat Bangladesh 131 & 176 (59 ov.) by an innings and 193 runs. Sri Lankan off spinner Muttiah Muralitharan becomes the second bowler in history, after Shane Warne, to collect 700 Test wickets.
- Rugby union:
  - 2007 Tri Nations
    - New Zealand 33–6 South Africa at Jade Stadium, Christchurch — The All Blacks score three tries in the last 12 minutes to pull away from what was widely considered a Springboks "B" side. This sets up a winner-take-all showdown between the All Blacks and the Australia Wallabies on July 21 in Auckland, with the Tri Nations crown and the Bledisloe Cup at stake.
- American football:
  - World Cup – Kawasaki, Japan:
    - 5th Place Game: France 0–3 South Korea
    - 3rd Place Game: Sweden 0–7 Germany

=== 13 July 2007 (Friday) ===
- The Fifteenth Pan American Games begin in Rio de Janeiro, Brazil. (Official Website)
- Cycling: 2007 Tour de France – Stage 6 – Semur-en-Auxois – Bourg-en-Bresse (200 km)
  - In the last stage before the tour will enter the Alps, Tom Boonen (Quick-Step–Innergetic) sprints to his first stagewin of the Tour in two years. He finished in 5h 20'29" followed by Óscar Freire (Rabobank) and Erik Zabel (Team Milram). Boonen takes over the lead in the Points classification and the top 5 of the General classification remains unchanged. (leTour.fr)

=== 12 July 2007 (Thursday) ===
- Cycling: 2007 Tour de France – Stage 5 – Chablis – Autun (182.5 km)
  - Filippo Pozzato (Liquigas) won the stage in a time of 4:39:01 followed by Óscar Freire (Rabobank) and Daniele Bennati (Lampre–Fondital) in the same time. In the GC Fabian Cancellara (Team CSC) keeps wearing the yellow jersey with a total time of 24h 28'66", followed by Andreas Klöden (Astana Team) and Pozatto takes 3rd place. Alexander Vinokourov crashed before the final climb of the day and lost precious time in his attempt to win the Tour this year. (leTour.fr)
- Cricket:
  - Bangladesh cricket team in Sri Lanka in 2007
    - 3rd Test-2nd Day:Bangladesh 131 lead Sri Lanka 30/0 (8.4 ov.) by 101 runs
  - Quadrangular Series in Ireland in 2007
    - West Indies 165/6 (29.5/30 ov.) beat Scotland 152/7 (30/30 ov.) by 4 wickets (D/L)
- American football:
  - World Cup – Kawasaki, Japan:
    - Sweden 0–48 Japan
    - (United States) USA 33–7 Germany

=== 11 July 2007 (Wednesday) ===
- Football (soccer): 2007 Copa América semifinals at Venezuela:
  - Mexico 0–3 Argentina at Puerto Ordaz
- Cycling: 2007 Tour de France – Stage 4 – Villers-Cotterêts – Joigny (193 km)
  - Thor Hushovd (Crédit Agricole) wins the stage in 4:37:47, followed by Robert Hunter (Barloworld), and Óscar Freire (Rabobank) in the same time. In the GC, Fabian Cancellara (Team CSC) retains the yellow jersey for another day, in 19:49:55, followed by Hushovd (+29"), Andreas Klöden (Astana Team) (+33") and David Millar (Saunier Duval–Prodir) in +41".(leTour.fr)
- Cricket:
  - Bangladesh cricket team in Sri Lanka in 2007
    - 3rd Test-1st Day:Bangladesh 72/4 (29 ov.) lead Sri Lanka by 72 runs
  - Quadrangular Series in Ireland in 2007
    - Ireland 210/8 (50 ov.) beat Netherlands 209/6 (50 ov.) by 1 run

=== 10 July 2007 (Tuesday) ===
- Football (soccer): 2007 Copa América semifinals at Venezuela:
  - Uruguay 2–2 (aet) Brazil at Maracaibo
    - Brazil won via penalties, 4–5.
- Cycling: 2007 Tour de France – Stage 3 – Waregem – Compiègne (236 km)
  - The longest stage in this year's Tour is won by Fabian Cancellara (Team CSC) in 6:36:15, who retains the yellow jersey with a total time of 15:12:08 in the GC. Erik Zabel (Team Milram) and Danilo Napolitano (Lampre–Fondital) finished the stage in the same time. In the GC, Cancellara is pursued by Andreas Klöden (Astana Team) in +33", David Millar (Saunier Duval–Prodir) in +41", George Hincapie (Discovery Channel) in +43", and Bradley Wiggins (Cofidis), also in +43". (leTour.fr)
- Baseball:
  - Major League Baseball All-Star Game at AT&T Park, San Francisco, California
    - American League 5, National League 4. Ichiro Suzuki of the Seattle Mariners earns MVP honors with a 3-for-3 performance, capped off with the first inside-the-park home run in All-Star Game history.
- Basketball:
  - William Jones Cup at Taipei, Republic of China:
    - (Japan) Universiade team 102–101 (OT) Jordan
    - Lebanon 85–77 Qatar – Lebanon takes second place honors
    - Kazakhstan 107–90 Philippines – Despite losing the game, the Philippines takes third place honors after a logjam of teams with 5–4 records since the Philippines beat all of their opponents with 5–4 records
    - Iran 91–74 Athletes in Action (United States)
    - Korea 82–59 Chinese Taipei – Korea gave the Taiwanese a taste of what will happen at the Asian Championships in which they're bracketed at the same group.
- Cricket:
  - Quadrangular Series in Ireland in 2007:
    - 1st ODI:West Indies 82/0 (14.3 ov.) beat Netherlands 80 (31.2 ov.) by 10 wickets
- American football:
  - World Cup – Kawasaki, Japan:
    - Sweden 16–14 France
    - (United States) USA 77–0 South Korea

=== 9 July 2007 (Monday) ===
- Baseball:
  - 2007 State Farm Home Run Derby: Vladimir Guerrero of the Los Angeles Angels wins, defeating Alex Ríos of the Toronto Blue Jays in the final round.
- Basketball:
  - William Jones Cup at Taipei, Republic of China:
    - Lebanon 82–74 Universiade team (Japan)
    - Jordan 72–71 Iran – Jordan clinch their first William Jones Cup championship.
    - Philippines 88–80 Qatar
    - South Korea 81–78 Kazakhstan
    - Chinese Taipei 83–72 Athletes in Action (United States)
- Cycling: 2007 Tour de France – Stage 2 – Dunkerque – Ghent (168.5 km)
  - Gert Steegmans (QSI) outsprints his teammate Tom Boonen to win the stage finishing in their native Belgium in 3:48:22. A massive pile-up involving some 170 of the riders 2 km from the finish line means that the whole peloton get the same time, as allowed by the rules as they were within 3 km of the finish. In the GC, Fabian Cancellara retains the yellow jersey for the third day, with a time of 8:36:13. (leTour.fr)

=== 8 July 2007 (Sunday) ===
- Football (soccer): 2007 Copa América quarterfinals at Venezuela:
  - Mexico 6–0 Paraguay at Maturín
  - Argentina 4–0 Peru at Barquisimeto
- Auto racing:
  - Formula One: British Grand Prix at Silverstone, England.
  (1) Kimi Räikkönen (Finland) (2) Fernando Alonso (Spain) (3) Lewis Hamilton (United Kingdom)
  - Champ Car: Grand Prix of Toronto in Toronto, Ontario, Canada.
  (1) Will Power (Australia) (2) Neel Jani (Switzerland) (3) Justin Wilson (United Kingdom)
  - IRL: Camping World Watkins Glen Grand Prix at Watkins Glen, New York.
  (1) Scott Dixon (New Zealand) (2) Sam Hornish Jr. (United States) (3) Dario Franchitti (United Kingdom)
- Cycling: 2007 Tour de France – Stage 1 – London – Canterbury (203 km)
  - Robbie McEwen (Predictor-Lotto), at the back of the peloton with 5 km to go, surges through in the last 100 metres to win the stage in 4:39:01, followed by Thor Hushovd (Crédit Agricole) and Tom Boonen (QSI). In the GC, Fabian Cancellara (Team CSC) retains the yellow jersey as leader of the general classification in 4:47:51, followed by Andreas Klöden (Astana Team) in +13", David Millar (Saunier Duval–Prodir) in +21" (leading the King of the Mountains competition), George Hincapie (Discovery Channel Pro Cycling Team) in +23", and Bradley Wiggins (Cofidis) in +23". (leTour.fr)
- Basketball:
  - William Jones Cup at Taipei, Republic of China:
    - (United States) Athletes in Action 108–83 Universiade team (Japan)
    - Lebanon 73–69 Korea
    - Iran 82–60 Kazakhstan
    - Philippines 82–64 Chinese Taipei – ESPN Star Sports' coverage being produced by its Taiwanese unit was cut off to give way to the British Grand Prix when Chinese Taipei was trailing by 20 points with 3 minutes to go in the fourth quarter.
    - Jordan 91–85 Qatar
- Major League Baseball:
  - The Philadelphia Phillies defeat the Colorado Rockies, 6–5, to temporarily avoid becoming the first MLB team to lose 10,000 games in its history before the 2007 All-Star Break. During the game, the Phillies players all came out and assisted the grounds crew at Coors Field in placing the tarp over the infield when high winds whipped the tarp out of control, lifting many of the groundskeepers off the ground, some as high as 10 feet (3.0 meters). No one was hurt.
- Tennis: 2007 Wimbledon Gentlemen's Singles Final:
  - (Switzerland) Roger Federer def. (Spain) Rafael Nadal 7–6(7), 4–6, 7–6(3), 2–6, 6–2

=== 7 July 2007 (Saturday) ===
- Football (soccer): 2007 Copa América quarterfinals at Venezuela:
  - Uruguay 4–1 Venezuela at San Cristóbal
  - Brazil 6–1 Chile at Puerto la Cruz
- Baseball:
  - Pitcher Érik Bédard of the Baltimore Orioles faces the minimum 27 batters and strikes out 15 in a 3–0 win over the Texas Rangers. Bédard gives up two hits, both of which are followed by double plays. (AP via Yahoo)
- Auto racing:
  - NASCAR Nextel Cup: Pepsi 400 at Daytona Beach, Florida.
  (1) Jamie McMurray (2) Kyle Busch (3) Kurt Busch

The photo finish (0.05 seconds) is the second closest in NASCAR history.

- Cycling: 2007 Tour de France – Prologue – London (7.9 km) Individual time trial
  - GC: 1. Fabian Cancellara (Team CSC) 8'50"; 2. Andreas Klöden (Astana Team) +13"; 3. George Hincapie (Discovery Channel Pro Cycling Team) +23"; 4. Bradley Wiggins (Cofidis) +23" (leTour.fr)
- Basketball:
  - William Jones Cup at Taipei, Republic of China:
    - Jordan 72–68 Lebanon
    - (United States) Athletes in Action 92–78 Kazakhstan
    - Philippines 89–79 Iran
    - Korea 102–58 Universiade team (Japan)
    - Chinese Taipei 75–70 Qatar
- Cricket:
  - West Indian cricket team in England in 2007
    - 3rd ODI:West Indies 289/5 (50 ov.) beat England 196 (44.2 ov.) by 93 runs
      - Chris Gayle goes past 6000 career ODI runs.
      - West Indies win the series 2–1 with none to play.
- Rugby union:
  - 2007 Tri Nations
    - Australia 25–17 South Africa at Telstra Stadium, Sydney — The Springboks, fielding what was widely thought to be a "B team", score two tries in the first seven minutes and take a 17–0 lead after 16 minutes. The Wallabies come back to give longtime icons George Gregan and Stephen Larkham a win in their last game for the Wallabies on Australian soil.
- Tennis: 2007 Wimbledon, London, England
  - Ladies' Singles Final:
    - (23) (United States) Venus Williams def. (18) (France) Marion Bartoli, 6–4, 6–1
  - Men's Singles Semifinals:
    - (1) (Switzerland) Roger Federer def. (12) (France) Richard Gasquet, 7–5, 6–3, 6–4
    - (2) (Spain) Rafael Nadal def. (4) (Serbia) Novak Djokovic, 3–6, 6–1, 4–1 ret. (inj)

=== 6 July 2007 (Friday) ===
- Baseball:
  - The Minnesota Twins sweep a doubleheader against the Chicago White Sox, 20–14 and 12–0. Minnesota's 32 runs are the most scored by a team in a doubleheader since 1939. Justin Morneau hits three home runs in Game 2. (AP via Yahoo)
- Basketball:
  - William Jones Cup at Taipei, Republic of China:
    - Qatar 86–68 Universiade team (Japan)
    - (United States) Athletes in Action 81–70 Lebanon
    - Jordan 74–70 Philippines
    - Iran 68–61 Korea
    - Chinese Taipei 72–64 Kazakhstan
- Tennis: 2007 Wimbledon, London, England
  - Ladies' Singles Semifinals:
    - (23) (United States) Venus Williams def. (6) (Serbia) Ana Ivanovic, 6–2, 6–4
    - (18) (France) Marion Bartoli def. (1) (Belgium) Justine Henin, 1–6, 7–5, 6–1

=== 5 July 2007 (Thursday) ===
- Basketball:
  - William Jones Cup at Taipei, Republic of China:
    - Qatar 80–70 Kazakhstan
    - Iran 86–59 Universiade team (Japan)
    - Jordan 69–66 Athletes in Action (United States)
    - Philippines 88–84 Korea
    - Chinese Taipei 78–77 (OT) Lebanon – Lebanon's Fadi El Khatib missed two freethrows at the end of regulation to set up a three-pointer by Lin Chih-jay at the buzzer. At the end of OT, a put-back by Tsun Wen-Din after a missed three-pointer by Chen Hsin-an put them ahead 78–77; Rony Fahed missed a field-goal to win the game for the Taiwanese.
- Cricket:
  - Bangladesh cricket team in Sri Lanka in 2007
    - 2nd Test, 3rd Day: Sri Lanka 451/6 (dec) beat Bangladesh 62 & 299 (86.2 ov.) by an innings and 90 runs

=== 4 July 2007 (Wednesday) ===
- Competitive eating:
  - 92nd Nathan's Hot Dog Eating Contest at Coney Island, New York City:
    - Joey Chestnut of San Jose, California upsets six-time champion Takeru Kobayashi by downing a record 66 hot dogs and buns in 12 minutes. (AP via Forbes)
- Basketball:
  - William Jones Cup at Taipei, Republic of China:
    - Lebanon 90–77 Kazakhstan
    - Qatar 74–72 Iran
    - (Japan) Universiade team 86–84 Philippines – The Philippines had another collapse at the end game as Yusuke Otada converted a layup via a fastbreak after a turnover with a second remaining.
    - (United States) Athletes in Action 79–65 Korea
    - Jordan 81–62 Chinese Taipei
- Cricket:
  - Bangladesh cricket team in Sri Lanka in 2007
    - 2nd Test, 2nd Day: Sri Lanka 451/6 (dec) lead Bangladesh 62 & 69/4 (14 ov.) by 320 runs
      - Bangladesh collapse to their lowest ever test score in the first innings
  - West Indian cricket team in England in 2007
    - West Indies 278/5 (50 ov.) beat England 217 (46 ov.) by 61 runs
- Rugby league:
  - In the final match of the 2007 State of Origin, New South Wales avoid a series whitewash by defeating Queensland 18–4 at Suncorp Stadium in Brisbane. Queensland had already secured the series win with victories in the first two matches.
- Winter Olympic Games
  - Sochi, Russia is awarded the 2014 Winter Olympics.

=== 3 July 2007 (Tuesday) ===
- 2007 America's Cup:
  - America's Cup holders (Switzerland) Alinghi (SUI-100) retain the Cup in Valencia, Spain, defeating Emirates Team New Zealand (NZL-92) by 1 second to secure a 5–2 victory in the best-of-nine final.
- Baseball:
  - Barry Bonds home run record chase:
    - Bonds hits career home run No. 751, a two-run shot off Aaron Harang, in the first inning of the San Francisco Giants' 7–3 loss to the Cincinnati Reds at Great American Ball Park. He is now four homers shy of Hank Aaron.
- Basketball:
  - William Jones Cup at Taipei, Republic of China:
    - (United States) Athletes in Action 106–68 Qatar
    - Kazakhstan 96–61 Universiade team (Japan)
    - Korea 71–65 Jordan
    - Lebanon 65–62 Philippines
    - Iran 85–69 Chinese Taipei

=== 2 July 2007 (Monday) ===
- Baseball:
  - MLB:
    - New York Yankees pitcher Roger Clemens achieves his 350th win in a 5–1 victory over the Minnesota Twins.
- Basketball:
  - William Jones Cup at Taipei, Republic of China:
    - Jordan 63–61 Kazakhstan
    - Lebanon 80–71 Iran
    - Korea 70–69 Qatar – Kim Min-soo tipped in Yang Dong-guen's missed layup as the buzzer sounded to give Korea the come-from-behind win.
    - Philippines 72–67 Athletes in Action (United States)
    - Chinese Taipei 90–77 Universiade team (Japan)

=== 1 July 2007 (Sunday) ===
- Golf
  - U.S. Women's Open
    - Cristie Kerr won her first major championship with a two-stroke victory over Angela Park and Lorena Ochoa.
- Auto racing:
  - Formula One: French Grand Prix at Magny-Cours.
  (1) Kimi Räikkönen (Finland) (2) Felipe Massa (Brazil) (3) Lewis Hamilton (United Kingdom)
  - Champ Car: Grand Prix of Mont-Tremblant in Saint-Jovite, Quebec, Canada.
  (1) Robert Doornbos (Netherlands) (2) Sébastien Bourdais (France) (3) Will Power (Australia)
  - NASCAR Nextel Cup: Lenox Industrial Tools 300 at Loudon, New Hampshire.
  (1) Denny Hamlin (2) Jeff Gordon (3) Martin Truex Jr.
- Cricket:
  - Pakistan in Scotland
    - Match abandoned without a ball bowled
  - 2007 Future Cup
    - India 152/4 (30.2/31 ov.) beat South Africa 148/7 (31/31 ov.) by 6 wickets
  - West Indian cricket team in England in 2007
    - England 225 (49.5 ov.) beat West Indies 146 (39.5 ov.) by 79 runs
  - 2007–08 ICC Intercontinental Cup
    - Netherlands 297 & 310 beat Canada 337/9 (dec) & 225 (70 ov.) by 45 runs
- Ice hockey
  - NHL
    - Beginning of free agency, allowing teams to offer contracts, and sign free agents.
