= June 2007 in sports =

<<	June 2007					>>
Su	Mo	Tu	We	Th	Fr	Sa
					1	2
3	4	5	6	7	8	9
10	11	12	13	14	15	16
17	18	19	20	21	22	23
24	25	26	27	28	29	30
India; Sports

This list shows notable sports-related deaths, events, and notable outcomes that occurred in June of 2007.

== Deaths ==
- 24: Chris Benoit
- 23: Rod Beck
- 19: Terry Hoeppner
- 11: Ray Mears
- 4: Clete Boyer
- 4: Bill France Jr.

== Sporting seasons ==
- Auto racing 2007:
  - Formula One
  - Champ Car
  - NASCAR NEXTEL Cup
  - NASCAR Busch Series
  - NASCAR Craftsman Truck Series
  - World Rally Championship
  - IRL
  - GP2
  - V8 Supercar
  - Rolex Sports Car Series
  - American Le Mans Series
  - FIA GT
  - Le Mans Series
  - Japan Le Mans Challenge
- Baseball 2007
  - Chinese Professional Baseball League (Taiwan)
  - Major League Baseball
- Basketball 2007:
  - NCAA Philippines
  - PBA Fiesta Conference Playoffs
- Cricket 2007:
  - England
- Cycling
  - UCI ProTour
- Football (soccer) 2006–07:
  - England (general)
  - Scotland (general)
  - Argentina
  - Major League Soccer
- Golf:
  - 2007 PGA Tour
  - 2007 European Tour
  - 2007 LPGA Tour
- Lacrosse 2007:
  - Major League Lacrosse
- Motorcycle racing 2007:
  - Motorcycle GP
- Rugby league 2007:
  - Super League XII
- Shooting 2007:
  - 2007 ISSF World Cup
- Speedway:
  - Speedway Grand Prix

== Days of the month ==
=== 30 June 2007 (Saturday) ===
- Auto racing:
  - IRL: The SunTrust Indy Challenge in Richmond, Virginia
  (1) Dario Franchitti (United Kingdom) (2) Scott Dixon (New Zealand) (3) Dan Wheldon (United Kingdom)
- Rugby union: Tri Nations
  - Australia 20–15 New Zealand at Melbourne Cricket Ground, Melbourne. The Wallabies come back from a 15–6 halftime deficit to stun the world's top-ranked team.

=== 29 June 2007 (Friday) ===
- National Football League: The league announces that NFL Europa, its European developmental league, will be immediately shut down after 16 years of operation. (NFL)
- Cricket:
  - West Indian cricket team in England in 2007
    - 2nd T20:England 173/5 (19.3 ov.) beat West Indies 169/7 (20 ov.) by 5 wickets Series tied 1–1 with none to play.
  - 2007 Future Cup
    - India 227/4 (49.1 ov.) beats South Africa 226/6 (50 ov.) by 6 wickets. Series tied 1–1 with one more to play.
    Sachin Tendulkar passes 15,000 career ODI runs in this match.
- Major League Baseball
  - Baltimore Orioles first baseman Aubrey Huff hits for the cycle, becoming the third Orioles player ever to do so, joining Brooks Robinson and Cal Ripken Jr. He is also the first Oriole to hit one at home in Baltimore, Maryland, hitting a triple in the first inning, a double in the third, a home run in the fifth and a single in the seventh at Oriole Park at Camden Yards. The Orioles lost the game, however, to the Los Angeles Angels of Anaheim, 9–7.
  - San Francisco Giants outfielder Barry Bonds hits his 750th home run in the eighth inning off Liván Hernández in a 6–4 loss to the Arizona Diamondbacks.

=== 28 June 2007 (Thursday) ===
- Canadian Football League:
  - Bashir Levingston of the Toronto Argonauts returns a missed field goal from the back of the 20-yard end zone and traverses the 110-yard field for a 129-yard touchdown, the longest play in the history of professional gridiron football. (TSN)
- Major League Baseball:
  - Toronto Blue Jays designated hitter Frank Thomas hit his 500th career home run, a three-run shot, in the first inning of their game at the Metrodome in Minneapolis against the Minnesota Twins' Carlos Silva. He is the 21st member of the 500 home run club. The Twins won the game, 8–5.
  - Houston Astros second baseman Craig Biggio collects his 3000th career hit, a seventh-inning single off the Colorado Rockies' Aaron Cook at Minute Maid Park in Houston. Biggio was thrown out trying to stretch the hit to a double. He is the 27th member of the 3000-hit club, and only the ninth player to record all 3000 hits with the same club. This was the third of his five hits in the game, tying his career record. The Astros won 8–5 on Carlos Lee's walk-off grand slam in the 11th inning, with Biggio on third base at the time of the shot.
- 2007 NBA draft in Madison Square Garden, New York City
  - Greg Oden was the number one pick by the Portland Trail Blazers, with the Seattle SuperSonics getting Kevin Durant as the second overall choice.
- Cricket:
  - Bangladeshi cricket team in Sri Lanka in 2007
    - 1st Test-4th Day: Sri Lanka 577/6 (dec) beat Bangladesh 89 & 254 (87.1 ov.) by an innings and 234 runs
  - West Indian cricket team in England in 2007
    - 1st T20:West Indies 208/8 (20 ov.) beat England 193/7 (20 ov.) by 15 runs
- Football (soccer):
  - 2007 Copa América in Venezuela
    - Group C
      - Paraguay 5–0 Colombia
      - Argentina 4–1 United States

=== 27 June 2007 (Wednesday) ===
- Cricket:
  - Bangladesh cricket team in Sri Lanka in 2007
    - 1st Test-3rd Day: Sri Lanka 577/6 (dec) leads Bangladesh 89 & 233/5 (82.3 ov.) by 255 runs
- Football (soccer):
  - 2007 Copa América in Venezuela
    - Group B
      - Ecuador 2–3 Chile
      - Brazil 0–2 Mexico
- Major League Baseball:
  - Philadelphia Phillies first baseman Ryan Howard hit his 100th career home run – a 505-foot three-run blast into the Ashburn Alley at Citizens Bank Park – becoming the fastest player to reach that milestone (325 games). However, the Phillies lost to the Cincinnati Reds, 9–6.

=== 26 June 2007 (Tuesday) ===
- Cricket:
  - Bangladesh cricket team in Sri Lanka in 2007
    - 1st Test-2nd Day: Sri Lanka 577/6 (dec) leads Bangladesh 89 & 3/0 (3 ov.) by 485 runs
  - 2007 Future Cup
    - 1st ODI: South Africa 245/6 (49.3 ov.) beat India 242/8 (50 ov.) by 4 wickets
      - South Africa leads the 3 ODI series 1–0 with 2 to play.
- Football (soccer):
  - 2007 Copa América in Venezuela
    - Group A
      - Uruguay 0–3 Peru
      - Venezuela 2–2 Bolivia

=== 25 June 2007 (Monday) ===
- Cricket:
  - Bangladesh cricket team in Sri Lanka in 2007
    - 1st Test-1st Day: Bangladesh 89 trails Sri Lanka 227/3 (51 ov.) by 138 runs
- American football:
  - The Chicago Bears waive defensive tackle Tank Johnson three days after he is arrested in Gilbert, Arizona on suspicion of driving while impaired. (NY Times)

=== 24 June 2007 (Sunday) ===
- Soccer:
  - 2007 CONCACAF Gold Cup Final:
    - United States 2:1 Mexico
- Auto racing:
  - NASCAR Nextel Cup: Toyota/SaveMart 350 at Infineon Raceway.
  (1) Juan Pablo Montoya (Colombia) (2) Kevin Harvick (3) Jeff Burton
  Montoya wins his first Nextel Cup race since moving from Formula One.
  - IRL: The Iowa Corn Indy 250 in Newton, Iowa
  (1) Dario Franchitti (United Kingdom) (2) Marco Andretti (United States) (3) Scott Sharp (United States)
  - Champ Car: Grand Prix of Cleveland in Cleveland, Ohio, USA.
  (1) Paul Tracy (Canada) (2) Robert Doornbos (Netherlands) (3) Neel Jani (Switzerland)
- Baseball:
  - Major League Baseball interleague play:
    - Toronto Blue Jays pitcher Dustin McGowan, who had won only five games before in his career, carries a no-hit bid into the ninth inning against the Colorado Rockies. He finishes with a one-hit, one-walk shutout.
  - 2007 College World Series:
    - The Oregon State Beavers defeat the North Carolina Tar Heels, 9–3, to clinch the best-of-three finals series and win their second straight College World Series. (AP via Yahoo)
- Cricket:
  - 2007 Future Cup
    - South Africa 173/4 (31 ov.) beat Ireland 131 (30.5 ov.) by 42 runs
- Basketball:
  - Spanish ACB Finals
    - Real Madrid 83–71 Winterthur FCB, Real Madrid wins championship series, 3–1

=== 23 June 2007 (Saturday) ===
- Rugby union: Tri Nations
  - South Africa 21–26 New Zealand at ABSA Stadium, Durban
- Cricket:
  - 2007 Future Cup
    - India 171/1 (34.5 ov.) beat Ireland 193 (50 ov.) by 9 wickets (D/L)

=== 22 June 2007 (Friday) ===
- Ice hockey:
  - 2007 NHL entry draft in Columbus, Ohio:
    - The Chicago Blackhawks select American right wing Patrick Kane of the Ontario Hockey League's London Knights with the first pick.

=== 20 June 2007 (Wednesday) ===
- Baseball:
  - Texas Rangers designated hitter Sammy Sosa hits the 600th home run of his career, becoming only the fifth player in Major League Baseball history to pass the milestone. He hit the shot off of Jason Marquis in the fifth inning of a game against the Chicago Cubs, for whom he hit 545 homers in 13 seasons. The ball went into the Rangers bullpen and was caught by relief pitcher Akinori Otsuka. The Rangers won the game, 7–3. (AP via ESPN)
- Football (soccer):
  - CONMEBOL 2007 Copa Libertadores final
    - (Brazil) Grêmio 0–2 Boca Juniors (Argentina) (aggregate 0–5) (Report)
    Boca Juniors win their sixth championship title and advance to the 2007 FIFA Club World Cup.
  - The Netherlands national under-21 football team reach the final of the UEFA U-21 Championship 2007. Their semi-final against England under-21 ends in 1–1 after extra time. After a shoot-out of 32 penalties (a record in international tournaments) The Netherlands win 13–12.

=== 19 June 2007 (Tuesday) ===
- Cricket:
  - West Indian cricket team in England in 2007
    - 4th Test-5th Day: England 400 & 111/3 (21.4 ov.) beat West Indies 287 & 222 by 7 wickets.
    - England win the Test series 3–0

=== 18 June 2007 (Monday) ===
- Baseball:
  - The Baltimore Orioles fire manager Sam Perlozzo and name Dave Trembley interim manager. The Orioles are 128–172 in his 2 1/2 years at the helm, and were at the bottom of the American League East Division when they let him go.
- Cricket:
  - West Indian cricket team in England in 2007
    - 4th Test-4th Day: England 400 lead West Indies 287 & 83/3 (19.2 ov.) by 30 runs

=== 17 June 2007 (Sunday) ===
- Golf:
  - Ángel Cabrera of Argentina, who had never won a PGA Tour event, wins the U.S. Open by one stroke over Tiger Woods and Jim Furyk at Oakmont Country Club in Oakmont, Pennsylvania.
- Auto racing:
  - Formula One: United States Grand Prix at the Indianapolis Motor Speedway.
  (1) Lewis Hamilton (United Kingdom) (2) Fernando Alonso (Spain) (3) Felipe Massa (Brazil)
  - 24 Hours of Le Mans
  Audi drivers Marco Werner, Emanuele Pirro, and Frank Biela defeat newcomers Peugeot with the second straight win for the diesel-powered #1 R10 prototype, covering 369 laps for the company's seventh win in eight years. Binnie Motorsport's #31 Lola–Zytek wins in the LMP2 class, Aston Martin Racing's #009 DBR9 defeats Corvette in GT1, and the #76 IMSA Performance Matmut Porsche leads over Ferrari in the GT2 class.
  - NASCAR NEXTEL Cup: The Citizens Bank 400 in Brooklyn, Michigan
  (1) Carl Edwards (2) Martin Truex Jr. (3) Tony Stewart
- Cricket:
  - West Indian cricket team in England in 2007
    - 4th Test-3rd Day: West Indies 287 (97.1 ov.) lead England 121/4 (34 ov.) by 166 runs
- Football (soccer): La Liga
  - Real Madrid secure their first league championship in four years when they defeat Real Mallorca on the last day of the season by 3–1, edging out FC Barcelona who beat relegated Gimnàstic 5–1 because of Real's better head-to-head record.

=== 16 June 2007 (Saturday) ===
- Rugby union:
  - Tri Nations
    - South Africa 22–19 Australia at Newlands, Cape Town
  - Internationals
    - New Zealand 64–13 Canada at Waikato Stadium, Hamilton
- Cricket:
  - West Indian cricket team in England in 2007
    - 4th Test-2nd Day:West Indies 132/4 (40.4 ov.) lead England by 132 runs
- Baseball: US Major Leagues
  - A benches-clearing brawl ensues after San Diego Padres pitcher Chris Young hits Chicago Cubs center fielder Derrek Lee with a pitch. Young, Lee, Padres pitcher Jake Peavy and Cubs hitting coach Gerald Perry are all ejected. The incident overshadowed 7 1/3 innings of no-hit ball by Carlos Zambrano, who suffered a 1–0 complete-game loss for the Cubs after a ninth-inning home run by Russell Branyan.

=== 15 June 2007 (Friday) ===
- American football:
  - Utah Blaze (AFL) wide receiver and former NFL player Justin Skaggs passes away due to complications from brain cancer. He was taken in for emergency surgery the previous day after his brain tumors expanded and built intracranial pressure, and he rapidly deteriorated from there. He never awoke, and was rendered brain dead. He was 28.
- NCAA College baseball
  - The 2007 College World Series gets underway at Johnny Rosenblatt Stadium in Omaha, Nebraska. Eight NCAA Division I baseball teams compete for the national championship. The event runs until June 25.
- Cricket:
  - West Indian cricket team in England in 2007
    - 4th Test-1st Day:No play, rained out

=== 14 June 2007 (Thursday) ===
- Basketball:
  - 2007 NBA Finals: San Antonio Spurs 83, Cleveland Cavaliers 82, San Antonio wins series, 4–0
    - The Spurs win their fourth NBA title in nine seasons. The Cavs mount a furious rally at the beginning of the fourth quarter to go ahead by three, but San Antonio pulls away thanks to Manu Ginóbili, who scores 13 of his team-leading 27 points in the last 5:24. Tony Parker, who scores 24 in game 4, is named MVP of the finals.
- Ice hockey:
  - Sidney Crosby of the Pittsburgh Penguins wins the Hart Memorial Trophy as the most-valuable player in the 2006–07 National Hockey League season. Teammate Evgeni Malkin wins the Calder Memorial Trophy as the league's top rookie. Martin Brodeur takes the Vezina Trophy as top goaltender for the third time, while Nicklas Lidström of the Detroit Red Wings wins his fifth James Norris Memorial Trophy as the league's top defenceman. Vancouver Canucks coach Alain Vigneault receives the Jack Adams Award as coach of the year.

=== 12 June 2007 (Tuesday) ===
- Basketball:
  - 2007 NBA Finals: San Antonio Spurs 75, Cleveland Cavaliers 72, San Antonio leads series, 3–0
- Major League Baseball:
  - Justin Verlander of the Detroit Tigers pitches a no-hitter against the Milwaukee Brewers, winning the game 4–0. (MLB.com)

=== 11 June 2007 (Monday) ===
- Cricket:
  - West Indian cricket team in England in 2007
    - 3rd Test-5th Day:England 370 & 313 beat West Indies 229 & 394 by 60 runs
    - England wins series, leading 2–0 with one test to play.

=== 10 June 2007 (Sunday) ===
- Basketball:
  - 2007 NBA Finals:
    - San Antonio Spurs 103, Cleveland Cavaliers 92, San Antonio leads series 2–0
    With LeBron James in foul trouble and the Spurs' frontcourt dominant in the paint, San Antonio takes a 28-point lead in the first half and holds on to go up 2–0. (AP via Yahoo)
- Tennis: French Open, Paris, France
  - Men's Singles final:
    - (2) (Spain) Rafael Nadal def. (1) (Switzerland) Roger Federer, 6–3, 4–6, 6–3, 6–4
- Auto racing:
  - Formula One: Canadian Grand Prix in Montreal, Quebec.
  (1) Lewis Hamilton (United Kingdom) (2) Nick Heidfeld (Germany) (3) Alexander Wurz (Austria)
  - NASCAR NEXTEL Cup: The Pocono 500 in Long Pond, Pennsylvania
  (1) Jeff Gordon (2) Ryan Newman (3) Martin Truex Jr.
  - Champ Car: Grand Prix of Portland in Portland, Oregon, USA.
  (1) Sébastien Bourdais (France) (2) Justin Wilson (United Kingdom) (3) Robert Doornbos (Netherlands)
- Cricket:
  - West Indian cricket team in England in 2007
    - 3rd Test-4th Day:England 370 & 313 lead West Indies 229 & 301/5 (98 ov.) by 153 runs

=== 9 June 2007 (Saturday) ===
- Auto racing:
  - IRL: The Bombardier Learjet 550 in Fort Worth, Texas
  (1) Sam Hornish Jr. (United States) (2) Tony Kanaan (Brazil) (3) Danica Patrick (United States)
- Cricket:
  - West Indian cricket team in England in 2007
    - 3rd Test-3rd Day:England 370 & 313 lead West Indies 229 & 22/1 (8 ov.) by 432 runs
- Horse Racing:
  - Belmont Stakes:
    - Rags to Riches defeats Preakness Stakes winner Curlin by a head to become the first filly to win the Belmont since 1905. (New York Racing Association)
- Tennis: French Open, Paris, France
  - Women's Singles final:
    - (1) (Belgium) Justine Henin def. (7) (Serbia) Ana Ivanovic, 6–1, 6–2
- Rugby union:
  - Internationals
    - Argentina 24–6 Italy at Malvinas Argentinas, Mendoza
    - Australia 49–0 Fiji at Subiaco Oval, Perth
    - New Zealand 61–10 France at Westpac Stadium, Wellington
    - South Africa 35–8 Samoa at Ellis Park, Johannesburg
  - French Top 14 Final:
    - Stade Français 23–18 Clermont at Stade de France, Saint-Denis

=== 8 June 2007 (Friday) ===
- Tennis: French Open, Paris, France
  - Men's Singles semifinals:
    - (1) (Switzerland) Roger Federer def. (4) (Russia) Nikolay Davydenko, 7–5, 7–6 (7–5), 7–6 (9–7)
    - (2) (Spain) Rafael Nadal def. (6) (Serbia) Novak Djokovic, 7–5, 6–4, 6–2
- Football (soccer):
  - UEFA holds a hearing on the fan attack incident that occurred during the Euro 2008 qualifying match between Denmark and Sweden on June 2. They officially disqualify Denmark and award the match to Sweden, 3–0. In addition, Denmark was fined CHF100,000 (€61,000), and will be forced to play its next four home Euro 2008 qualifier matches at least 250 km away from Copenhagen. Its next home qualifier, against Liechtenstein, will be held behind closed doors. Christian Poulsen, who threw the punch against a Swedish player that led to his expulsion and the fan attack, will be suspended for three games.
- Cricket:
  - West Indian cricket team in England in 2007
    - 3rd Test-2nd Day:England 370 & 34/1 (6 ov.) lead West Indies 229 by 175 runs
- NCAA College sports
  - The University of Florida re-signs its football and basketball head coaches. Urban Meyer will be paid $3.25 million per year for six years, and Billy Donovan will be paid $3.5 million per year for six years. Both contracts have options for a seventh year. The deals come a week after Donovan signed on to coach the Orlando Magic, then later asked for the deal to be rescinded. They are now the highest paid college football/basketball coaching tandem in NCAA history.

=== 7 June 2007 (Thursday) ===
- Baseball:
  - Boston Red Sox pitcher Curt Schilling comes within one out of his first no-hitter. Shannon Stewart breaks up Schilling's bid with a single. Schilling then retires Mark Ellis to preserve a 1–0 shutout win. The only other A's base-runner of the evening reached on an error. (AP via Yahoo)
- Basketball:
  - NBA Finals Game 1 at SBC Center, San Antonio, Texas:
    - San Antonio Spurs 85, Cleveland Cavaliers 76, San Antonio leads series 1–0
    San Antonio's tough defense holds LeBron James to four field goals in 16 attempts, while Tony Parker and Tim Duncan lead the Spurs with 27 and 24 points, respectively. (AP via Yahoo)
  - After agreeing to rescind their contract with Billy Donovan, the Orlando Magic sign Stan Van Gundy to replace Brian Hill as their head coach. Donovan will return to the Florida Gators, though the Magic will retain his NBA rights for five years. The Magic will give the Miami Heat a second-round draft pick in exchange for Van Gundy's rights.
- Tennis: French Open, Paris, France
  - Women's Singles semifinals:
    - (1) (Belgium) Justine Henin def. (4) (Serbia) Jelena Janković, 6–4, 6–2
    - (7) (Serbia) Ana Ivanovic def. (2) (Russia) Maria Sharapova, 6–4, 6–2
- Soccer: Recopa Sudamericana, Porto Alegre, Brazil
  - Internacional (Brazil) defeat Pachuca (Mexico) 4–0 in Porto Alegre, erasing a 2–1 first-leg deficit to claim the trophy by a 5–2 aggregate score.
- Cricket:
  - West Indian cricket team in England in 2007
    - 3rd Test-1st Day:England 296/7 (86 ov.) lead West Indies by 296 runs

=== 6 June 2007 (Wednesday) ===
- Football (soccer) 2008 UEFA European Football Championship qualifying
  - Group A: Kazakhstan 1–1 Azerbaijan
  - Group A: Finland 2–0 Belgium
  - Group A: Armenia 1–0 Poland
  - Group B: Faroe Islands 0–2 Scotland
  - Group B: France 1–0 Georgia
  - Group B: Lithuania 0–2 Italy
  - Group C: Norway 4–0 Hungary
  - Group C: Bosnia and Herzegovina 1–0 Malta
  - Group C: Greece 2–1 Moldova
  - Group D: Germany 2–1 Slovakia
  - Group E: Andorra 0–2 Israel
  - Group E: Croatia 0–0 Russia
  - Group E: Estonia 0–3 England
  - Group F: Sweden 5–0 Iceland
  - Group F: Liechtenstein 0–2 Spain
  - Group F: Latvia 0–2 Denmark
  - Group G: Bulgaria 2–1 Belarus
  - Group G: Luxembourg 0–3 Albania
  - Group G: Romania 2–0 Slovenia
- Ice hockey:
  - Stanley Cup playoffs: Stanley Cup Finals:
    - Anaheim Ducks 6, Ottawa Senators 2, Anaheim wins series, 4–1
      - Scott Niedermayer wins the Conn Smythe Trophy as MVP of the playoffs.
      - The Ducks' Chris Pronger becomes the newest member of the Triple Gold Club, formalized last month by the International Ice Hockey Federation. The Club consists of individuals who have won the Stanley Cup along with gold medals at the Olympics and World Championships.
- Cricket:
  - 2007 Afro-Asia Cup
    - 1st ODI: Asia XI 317/9 (50 ov.) beat Africa XI 283 (47.5 ov.) by 34 runs
- Tennis: French Open, Paris, France
  - Men's Singles quarterfinals:
    - (2) (Spain) Rafael Nadal def. (23) (Spain) Carlos Moyá, 6–4, 6–3, 6–0
    - (6) (Serbia) Novak Djokovic def. (Russia) Igor Andreev, 6–3, 6–3, 6–3
- Yachting:
  - Louis Vuitton Cup 2007
    - Race 5: Emirates Team New Zealand beat Luna Rossa (Italy) to win the Louis Vuitton Cup 5–0 and the right to challenge Alinghi (Switzerland) for the America's Cup

=== 5 June 2007 (Tuesday) ===
- Tennis: French Open, Paris, France
  - Men's Singles quarterfinals:
    - (1) (Switzerland) Roger Federer def. (9) (Spain) Tommy Robredo, 7–5, 1–6, 6–1, 6–2
    - (4) (Russia) Nikolay Davydenko def. (19) (Argentina) Guillermo Cañas, 7–5, 6–4, 6–4
  - Women's Singles quarterfinals:
    - (1) (Belgium) Justine Henin def. (8) (United States) Serena Williams, 6–4, 6–3
    - (2) (Russia) Maria Sharapova def. (9) (Russia) Anna Chakvetadze, 6–3, 6–4
    - (7) (Serbia) Ana Ivanovic def. (3) (Russia) Svetlana Kuznetsova, 6–0, 3–6, 6–1
    - (4) (Serbia) Jelena Janković def. (6) (Czech Republic) Nicole Vaidišová, 6–3, 7–5
- Cricket:
  - 2007 Afro-Asia Cup
    - Only Twenty20: Asia XI 110/4 (15.5 ov.) beat Africa XI 109/8 (20 ov.) by 6 wickets

=== 4 June 2007 (Monday) ===
- Baseball:
  - Oakland Athletics second baseman Mark Ellis hits for the cycle in Oakland's 5–4 extra-inning win against the Boston Red Sox.
- Auto racing:
  - NASCAR NEXTEL Cup: The Autism Speaks 400 in Dover, Delaware (postponed from June 3 due to rain)
  (1) Martin Truex Jr. (2) Ryan Newman (3) Carl Edwards
- Ice hockey:
  - Stanley Cup playoffs: Stanley Cup Finals:
    - Anaheim Ducks 3, Ottawa Senators 2, Anaheim leads series 3–1
    Two Andy McDonald goals in a one-minute span give the Ducks the lead for good in the second period.

=== 3 June 2007 (Sunday) ===
- Auto racing:
  - IRL: The A.J. Foyt 225 in West Allis, Wisconsin
  (1) Tony Kanaan (Brazil) (2) Dario Franchitti (United Kingdom) (3) Dan Wheldon (United Kingdom)
- Rugby union:
  - In the final event of the 2006–07 IRB Sevens World Series, the Edinburgh Sevens, season leaders Fiji are upset 21–14 in the Cup quarterfinals by Wales, opening the door for New Zealand to win the series with a Cup win, which they proceed to do by defeating Samoa 34–5 in the final.

=== 2 June 2007 (Saturday) ===
- Basketball:
  - 2007 NBA Playoffs Eastern Conference finals:
    - Cleveland Cavaliers 98, Detroit Pistons 82, Cleveland wins series, 4–2
    Little-known rookie Daniel Gibson scores 31 points — 19 of them in the fourth quarter — to lead the Cavs to their first NBA Finals.
- Football (soccer):
  - 2008 UEFA European Football Championship qualifying
    - Group A: Kazakhstan 1–2 Armenia
    - Group A: Finland 0–2 Serbia
    - Group A: Belgium 1–2 Portugal
    - Group A: Azerbaijan 1–3 Poland
    - Group B: Faroe Islands 1–2 Italy
    - Group B: Lithuania 1–0 Georgia
    - Group B: France 2–0 Ukraine
    - Group C: Bosnia and Herzegovina 3–2 Turkey
    - Group C: Norway 4–0 Malta
    - Group C: Greece 2–0 Hungary
    - Group D: Wales 0–0 Czech Republic
    - Group D: Germany 6–0 San Marino
    - Group E: Russia 4–0 Andorra
    - Group E: North Macedonia 1–2 Israel
    - Group E: Estonia 0–1 Croatia
    - Group F: Iceland 1–1 Liechtenstein
    - Group F: Denmark 0–3 Sweden
    (Game abandoned in the 89th minute after a Danish fan attacked the referee who had just awarded a penalty to Sweden. At the time of the abandonment, the game was tied, 3–3. Sweden was awarded the match after an investigation, June 8.)
    - Group F: Latvia 0–2 Spain
    - Group G: Albania 2–0 Luxembourg
    - Group G: Slovenia 1–2 Romania
    - Group G: Belarus 0–2 Bulgaria
  - FIFA International friendly: United States 4–1 China
- Horse racing:
  - Favoured Authorized wins The Derby by five lengths, giving his jockey Frankie Dettori his first win in the race in 15 attempts. (BBC)
- Ice hockey:
  - Stanley Cup playoffs: Stanley Cup Finals:
    - Ottawa Senators 5, Anaheim Ducks 3, Anaheim leads series, 2–1
- Rugby union:
  - Internationals
    - Argentina 16–0 Ireland at José Amalfitani Stadium, Buenos Aires
    - Australia 31–0 Wales at Suncorp Stadium, Brisbane
    - New Zealand 42–11 France at Eden Park, Auckland
    - South Africa 55–22 England at Loftus Versfeld, Pretoria
    - Uruguay 5–29 Italy at Gran Parque Central, Montevideo
  - Edinburgh Sevens:
    - Fiji, New Zealand, Samoa and, in a surprise, the homestanding Scotland top the four pools. Current season leaders Fiji need only defeat Wales in their Cup quarterfinal tomorrow to secure the season crown.
- Cricket
  - 2007 ICC World Cricket League Division Three
    - Final
      - Uganda 241/8 (50 ov.) beat Argentina 150 (46.3 ov.) by 91 runs
    - 3rd Place
      - Papua New Guinea 263/6 (50 ov.) beat Cayman Islands 240/9 (50 ov.) by 23 runs
    - 5th Place
      - Hong Kong 242/6 (50 ov.) beat Tanzania 113 (33.1 ov.) by 129 runs
    - 7th Place
      - Italy 124/4 (33 ov.) beat Fiji 123 by 6 wickets

=== 1 June 2007 (Friday) ===
- NHL Ice hockey
  - The Pittsburgh Penguins name 19-year-old Sidney Crosby their new captain, making him the youngest in NHL history.
- NCAA College baseball
  - The 2007 NCAA Division I baseball tournament gets underway at 16 locations throughout the United States. The 64 team tournament will culminate with 8 teams in the 2007 College World Series.
- Football (soccer):
  - In the first international match played at the newly refurbished Wembley Stadium, London, England draw 1–1 with Brazil in a friendly.
