= Cyclone Akash =

North Indian Ocean cyclonic storm in 2007

Cyclonic Storm Akash
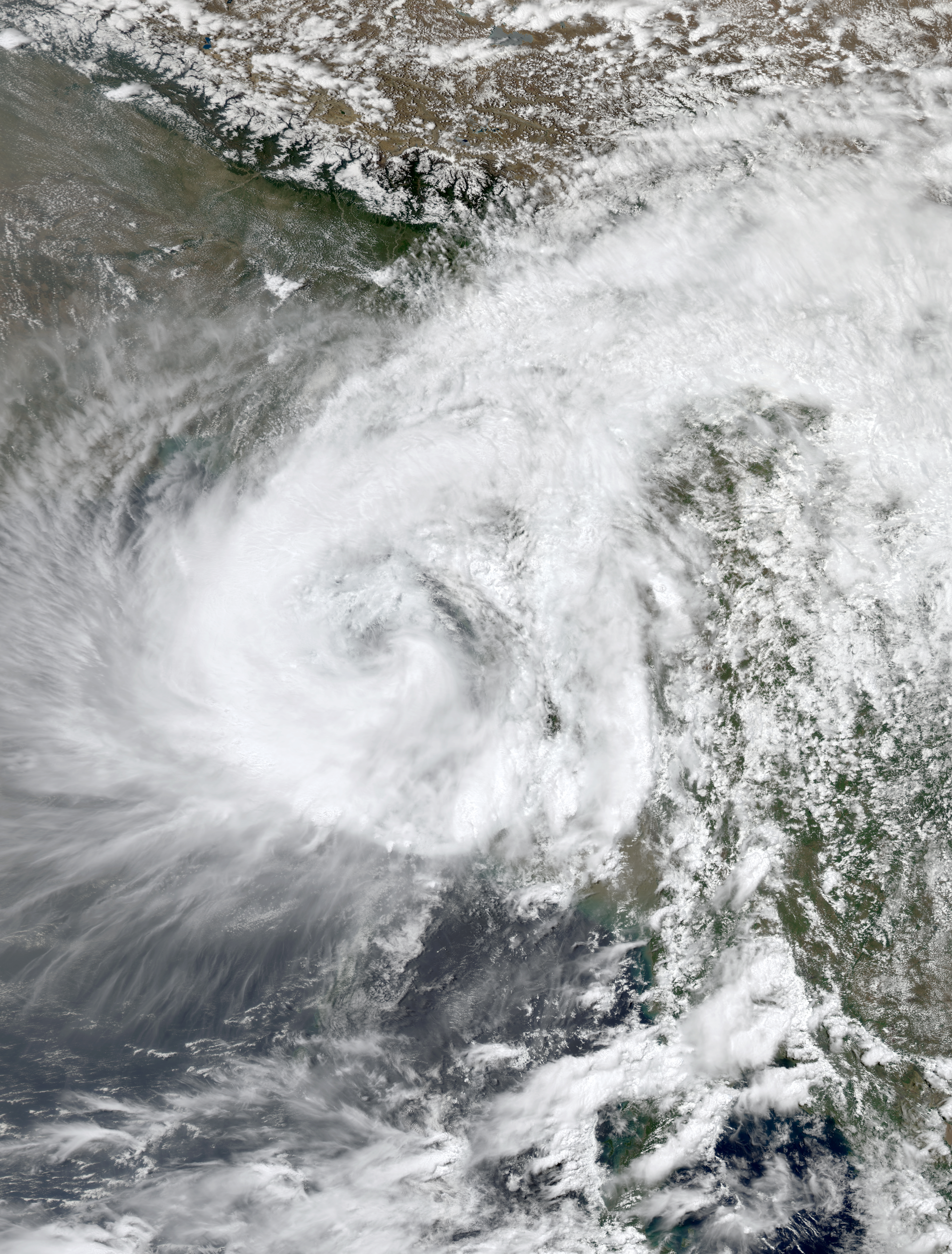
- Akash on May 14

Meteorological history
- Formed: May 12, 2007
- Dissipated: May 15, 2007

Cyclonic storm
- 3-minute sustained (IMD)
- Highest winds: 85 km/h (50 mph)
- Lowest pressure: 988 hPa (mbar); 29.18 inHg

Category 1-equivalent tropical cyclone
- 1-minute sustained (SSHWS/JTWC)
- Highest winds: 120 km/h (75 mph)
- Lowest pressure: 976 hPa (mbar); 28.82 inHg

Overall effects
- Fatalities: 14 direct
- Damage: $982 million (2007 USD)
- Areas affected: Bangladesh, Andaman Islands, Nicobar Islands, Burma
- IBTrACS
- Part of the 2007 North Indian Ocean cyclone season

Cyclonic Storm Akash (Note: The name Akash (Hindi: आकाश; [äː.käːʃ]) was contributed by India and means "sky" in Hindi.) (JTWC designation: 01B) was the first named tropical cyclone of the 2007 North Indian Ocean cyclone season. Warned by both India Meteorological Department (IMD) and Joint Typhoon Warning Center (JTWC), it formed from an area of disturbed weather on the Bay of Bengal on May 12, and gradually organized as it drifted northward. An eye began to develop as it approached land, and after reaching peak 3-min sustained winds of 85 km/h (55 mph) it struck about 115 km (71 mi) south of Chittagong in Bangladesh. Akash rapidly weakened over land, and advisories were discontinued on May 15.

The storm initially brought heavy rainfall to the Andaman and Nicobar Islands. Upon striking Bangladesh, Cyclonic Storm Akash produced a moderate storm tide, along with strong winds and heavy rains. The storm left dozens of boats missing, with three fisherman confirmed killed and another 50 missing. Near the coast, thousands of houses were damaged from the flooding caused by the storm. In Burma, the storm tide caused some coastal flooding. In all, 14 people were killed and damages amounted to US$982 million.

== Meteorological history ==
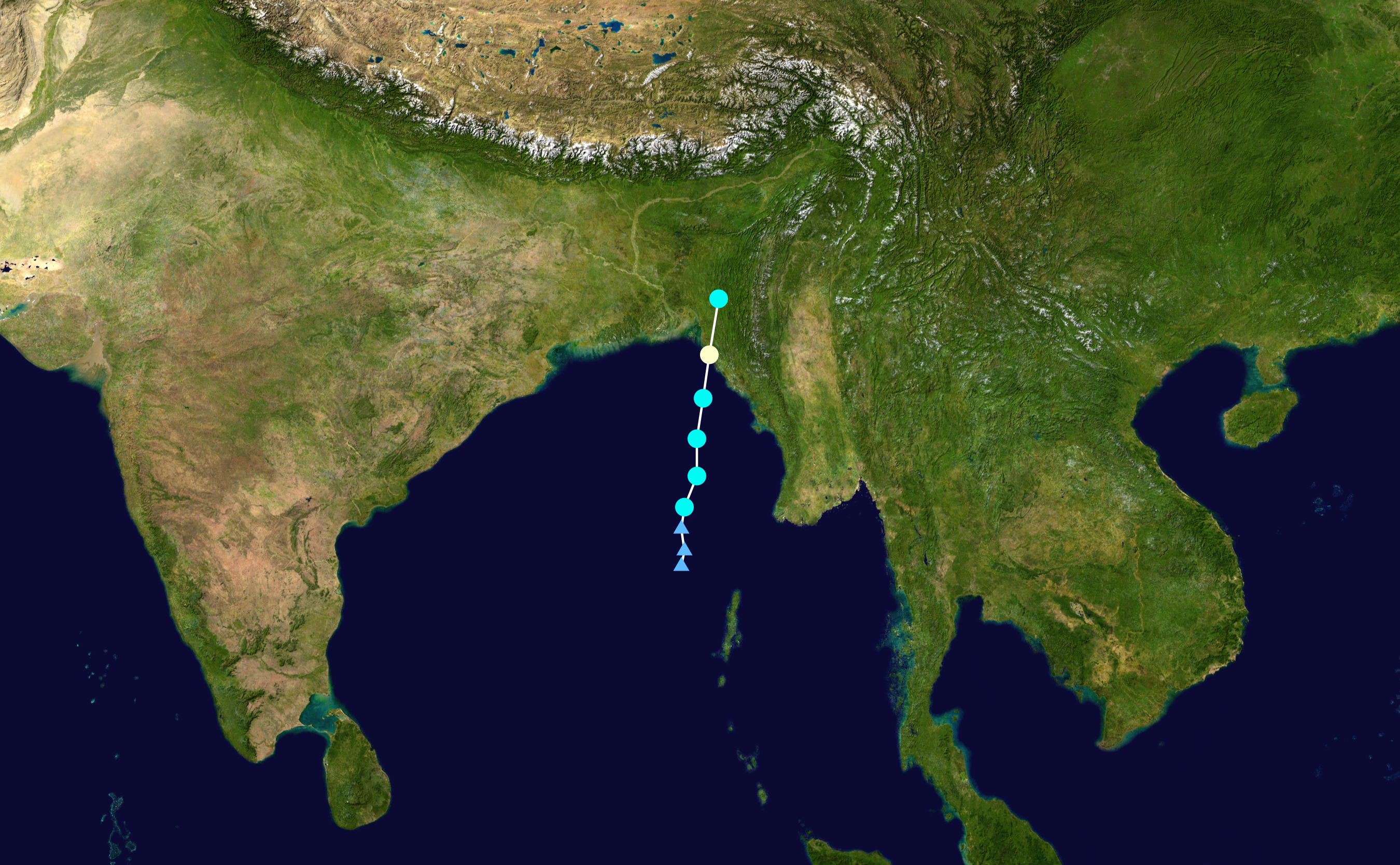
Map plotting the storm's track and intensity, according to the Saffir–Simpson scale Map key Saffir–Simpson scale Tropical depression (≤38 mph, ≤62 km/h) Tropical storm (39–73 mph, 63–118 km/h) Category 1 (74–95 mph, 119–153 km/h) Category 2 (96–110 mph, 154–177 km/h) Category 3 (111–129 mph, 178–208 km/h) Category 4 (130–156 mph, 209–251 km/h) Category 5 (≥157 mph, ≥252 km/h) Unknown Storm type Tropical cyclone Subtropical cyclone Extratropical cyclone, remnant low, tropical disturbance, or monsoon depression

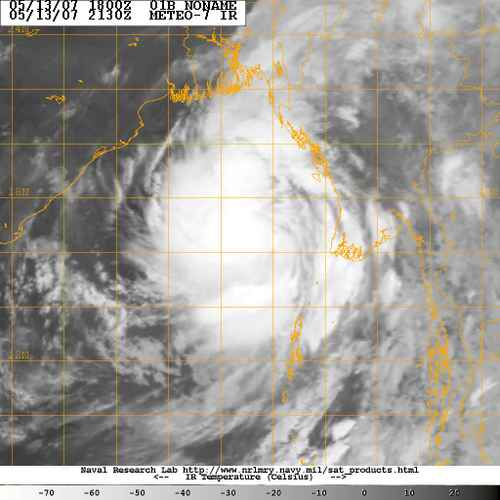
Image of Tropical Cyclone 01B (Akash) right after formation

During the second week of May, low pressures persisted across the Bay of Bengal. An area of convection developed on May 11, and the next day the India Meteorological Department (IMD) classified it as a depression. The system drifted northward, and initially moderate wind shear kept the deep convection on the periphery of the consolidating low-level circulation center. Gradually, banding features developed along the eastern semicircle, and with decreasing amounts of wind shear the system organized further. By May 13, the pressure had dropped to 1000 mbar as wind shear levels dropped significantly. An anticyclone developed over the system, while a mid-latitude trough over northeastern India provided favorable outflow. Convection continued to consolidate around the low-level circulation, and with well-defined banding features and a central dense overcast over the center of circulation, the Joint Typhoon Warning Center (JTWC) upgraded it to Tropical Cyclone 01B at 1121 UTC on May 13 while located about 545 km (339 mi) west-northwest of Yangon, Burma.

Upon first being upgraded, the storm tracked steadily northward due to a break in a mid-level ridge. Early on May 14, IMD upgraded the system to deep depression status, and six hours later classified it as Cyclonic Storm Akash after attaining 3-min sustained winds of 40 mph (65 km/h). Akash continued to organize, with deep convection wrapping fully around the low-level circulation. An eye began to form as the storm approached land, and at 1800 UTC on May 14 JTWC estimated 1-min sustained winds of 120 km/h (75 mph). Officially, Akash attained peak 3-min sustained winds of 85 km/h (55 mph) and a minimum central pressure of 988 hPa. Additionally, meteorologists in Burma estimated Akash peaked with winds of 160 km/h (100 mph). As it interacted with the mid-latitude westerlies, it began to become extratropical. Shortly after reaching peak winds, Akash made landfall about 115 km (71 mi) south of Chittagong. The storm weakened rapidly as it continued inland, and early on May 15 IMD issued its final advisory on the system; shortly thereafter, JTWC discontinued advisories. The name was contributed by India, Akash means Sky in Hindi language.

== Preparations ==
In its daily tropical weather outlook, the India Meteorological Department warned fishermen on the Andaman and Nicobar Islands to not go into the ocean due to the anticipated rough seas. Upon the cyclone approaching the coast of Bangladesh, officials canceled all flights to and from the Shah Amanat International Airport in Chattogram. Additionally, authorities at the port of Chittagong worked to protect cargo ships from the storm, and it was ultimately closed for a period of 19 hours. In preparation for Akash, officials advised coastal residents to evacuate further inland; about 80,000 total residents left for emergency shelters. About 40,000 Red Cross volunteers were prepared to aid those potentially affected.

== Impact ==
Wettest tropical cyclones and their remnants in Bangladesh Highest-known totals
| Precipitation | | | Storm | Location | Ref. |
| Rank | mm | in | Storm | Location | Ref. |
|---|---|---|---|---|---|
| 1 | 1,051.2 | 41.39 | Komen 2015 | Chittagong | |
| 2 | ~300 | ~12.00 | Rashmi 2008 | | |
| 3 | 280 | 11.02 | Monsoon Depression — Sep. 2004 | Barisal | |
| 4 | 253 | 10.00 | Viyaru 2013 | Patuakhali | |
| 5 | 227.2 | 8.94 | Trop. Depression — Oct. 2004 | Rangpur | |
| 6 | 220.0 | 8.66 | Bhola 1970 | Maya Bandar | |
| 7 | 200 | 7.87 | Sidr 2007 | | |
| 8 | 130 | 5.11 | Aila 2009 | Chittagong | |
| 9 | 129 | 5.07 | Bijli 2009 | | |
| 10 | 53 | 2.13 | Akash 2007 | | |

The India Meteorological Department estimated winds of 45–55 km/h (28–34 mph) affected the Andaman and Nicobar Islands, though no land reports were received. In Sittwe in Burma, the storm produced a storm tide of 3 m (9.8 ft), which flooded coastal areas.

In Chittagong, about 115 km (71 mi) north of where Akash moved ashore, surface stations reported peak winds of 37 km/h (23 mph) and a pressure of 996.8 hPa. Near its landfall location, Akash produced high tides that flooded coastal areas with up to 1.5 m (4.9 ft) of water, destroying at least 30 businesses. The cyclone destroyed 205 houses and left an additional 845 damaged. Akash caused moderate crop damage near the coast, including 2 hectares (4.9 acres) of destroyed lands of shrimp farms. Heavy precipitation was reported, with one station reporting a total of 53 mm (2.1 in); the rainfall caused flooding in inland areas. The heavy rains, caused by outer bands of the cyclone before it made landfall, limited play in Chittagong in the third One Day International cricket match between India and Bangladesh, before the match was abandoned. Strong winds caused power outages throughout Cox's Bazar District, and downed about 200 trees on St. Martin's Island. The cyclone left a total of 10 boats unaccounted for, with about 50 fishermen missing. In total, three fisherman were confirmed killed, all on St. Martin's Island, with two people left hospitalized. The passage of Cyclone Akash left many people homeless. Initially there was no response from the government. In all, 14 people were killed by Akash and damages amounted to US$982 million.

== See also ==
- List of tropical cyclone records
- Cyclone Mora
