= 2007 Abu Dhabi Series =

	Pakistan	Sri Lanka
- Dates: 18 May – 22 May 2007
Captains	Shoaib Malik	Mahela Jayawardene

One Day International series
- Results: Pakistan won the 3-match series 2–1
Most runs	Shoaib Malik (117)	Mahela Jayawardene (162)
Most wickets	Umar Gul (5)	Farveez Maharoof (6)
- Player of the series: Mahela Jayawardene (Sri Lanka) and Shahid Afridi (Pakistan)

The Abu Dhabi Series, also known as the Warid Cricket Series, was a cricket tournament, contested between Pakistan and Sri Lanka, from 18 to 22 May 2007. It was hosted on neutral soil, all 3 ODIs being played at the Sheikh Zayed Cricket Stadium in Abu Dhabi, UAE. It will be the first matches played by either side since the conclusion of the 2007 Cricket World Cup. Pakistan went on to win the series 2-1, only losing the final match of the series. All 3 matches were Day/Night matches.

== Squad lists ==
Pakistan	Sri Lanka
Shoaib Malik (c)	Mahela Jayawardene (c)
Kamran Akmal (wk)	Prasanna Jayawardene (wk)
Shahid Afridi	Ishara Amerasinghe
Fawad Alam	Malinga Bandara
Iftikhar Anjum	Tillakaratne Dilshan
Mohammad Asif	Dilhara Fernando
Salman Butt	Sanath Jayasuriya
Umar Gul	Chamara Kapugedera
Mohammad Hafeez	Kaushal Lokuarachchi
Yasir Hameed	Farveez Maharoof
Imran Nazir	Lasith Malinga
Abdul Razzaq	Ruchira Perera
Abdur Rehman	Chamara Silva
Mohammad Sami	Upul Tharanga
Najaf Shah	Malinda Warnapura
Mohammad Yousuf	

=== Squad changes ===
==== Pakistan ====
Following the retirement of Inzamam-ul-Haq after Pakistan's shock World Cup Group Stage exit, Pakistan named Shoaib Malik as ul-Haq's successor as captain. Younis Khan and Shoaib Akhtar were both dropped - Akhtar for his fitness, whilst Khan is playing English county cricket with Yorkshire County Cricket Club. Salman Butt was recalled to the team after 9 months out of the side.

==== Sri Lanka ====
Only nine of the fifteen players in the Sri Lankan squad who were present for their 2007 World Cup campaign are in the squad for the Abu Dhabi Series - Russel Arnold retired following the World Cup, whilst Muttiah Muralitharan, Kumar Sangakkara and Chaminda Vaas were all rested in order to be given the opportunity to play for their respective English county cricket teams. Young bowler Nuwan Kulasekara was dropped from the side, as well as former captain Marvan Atapattu, with Sri Lanka Cricket explaining they wanted to give experience to younger players, such as Malinda Warnapura who had earlier impressed for Sri Lanka A.

==== Coaches ====
Both teams had experienced recent changes in coaches: Pakistan's coach Bob Woolmer died in the West Indies following the team's exit from the World Cup - the investigation into his death, amidst claims of murder, is still ongoing. No full-time coach had been named before the series, although there has been speculation as to current Bangladesh coach Dav Whatmore taking over once he steps down at the end of India's tour of Bangladesh. Sri Lanka's coach Tom Moody announced his intention to leave Sri Lanka and return to Australia to coach the Western Warriors following the series.

== ODI series ==
=== 1st ODI ===
18 May 2007
(scorecard)

Sri Lanka; 235/9 (50 overs)	v	Pakistan; 239/5 (42 overs)
Farveez Maharoof 69* (54); Umar Gul 3/61 (10 overs)		Shahid Afridi 73* (34); Farveez Maharoof 1/47 (8 overs); Malinga Bandara 1/69 (10 overs)

Pakistan win by 5 wickets
Sheikh Zayed Cricket Stadium, Abu Dhabi, UAE
Umpires: Suresh Shastri (IND) and Mark Benson (ENG)
Player of the match: Shahid Afridi (PAK)

=== 2nd ODI ===
20 May 2007
(scorecard)

Pakistan; 313/9 (50 overs)	v	Sri Lanka; 215 (39.5 overs)
Salman Butt 74 (81); Yasir Hameed 50 (53); Malinga Bandara 3/56 (10 overs)		Mahela Jayawardene 61 (69); Shahid Afridi 3/37 (10 overs)

Pakistan win by 98 runs
Sheikh Zayed Cricket Stadium, Abu Dhabi, UAE
Umpires: Suresh Shastri (IND) and Russell Tiffin (ZIM)
Player of the match: Salman Butt (PAK)

=== 3rd ODI ===
22 May 2007
(scorecard)

Sri Lanka; 296/9 (50 overs)	v	Pakistan; 181 (42.5 overs)
Mahela Jayawardene 83 (81); Iftikhar Anjum 3/53 (10 overs)		Shoaib Malik 79* (85); Dilhara Fernando 3/20 (7 overs)

Sri Lanka win by 115 runs
Sheikh Zayed Cricket Stadium, Abu Dhabi, UAE
Umpires: Mark Benson (ENG) and Russell Tiffin (ZIM)
Player of the match: Dilhara Fernando (SRI)

- Pakistan won the series 2-1
