= Indian cricket team in Bangladesh in 2007 =

Indians in Bangladesh in 2007
	India	Bangladesh
- Dates: 10 May – 29 May 2007
Captains	Rahul Dravid	Habibul Bashar

Test series
- Result: India won the 2-match series 1–0
Most runs	Sachin Tendulkar (254)	Mashrafe Mortaza (151)
Most wickets	Zaheer Khan (8)	Mashrafe Mortaza (6); Mohammad Rafique (6)
- Player of the series: Sachin Tendulkar (India)

One Day International series
- Results: India won the 3-match series 2–0
Most runs	Mahendra Singh Dhoni (127)	Javed Omar (91)
Most wickets	Dinesh Mongia (3); Ramesh Powar (3); Piyush Chawla (3)	Syed Rasel (4)
- Player of the series: Mahendra Singh Dhoni (India)

The Indian cricket team toured Bangladesh for two Test matches and three One Day Internationals in May 2007. The first match was played on 10 May, the first of three ODIs with India defeating Bangladesh by five wickets – less than two months after Bangladesh shocked India by defeating them by five wickets in the World Cup, leading to India's early exit from the competition. India completed the series win with a steady 46-run win, thanks largely in part to Gautam Gambhir's century. The third match was abandoned due to intermittent rain, resulting in a waterlogged pitch – brought on largely in part due to Cyclone Akash which had hit south Bangladesh earlier that day. Leading run scorer of the ODI series and Indian wicket-keeper Mahendra Singh Dhoni took home the player of the series award following a return to form with the bat and 3 dismissals behind the stumps. In the second test match Mohammad Ashraful scored the fastest test fifty in just 27 delivery.

The Test series ended in a 1–0 win for India; the first Test was affected by rain, helping Bangladesh secure a draw despite two declarations by India and a 149-run lead on first innings, but in the second Test India only lost three wickets in their three-day innings win.

== Squad lists ==
ODI Squads		Test Squads	
Bangladesh	India	Bangladesh	India
Habibul Bashar (c)	Rahul Dravid (c)	Habibul Bashar (c)	Rahul Dravid (c)
Mushfiqur Rahim (wk)	Virender Sehwag (vc)	Khaled Mashud (wk)	Sachin Tendulkar (vc)
Aftab Ahmed	Mahendra Singh Dhoni (wk)	Mohammad Ashraful	Sourav Ganguly
Mohammad Ashraful	Piyush Chawla	Enamul Haque Jr	Mahendra Singh Dhoni (wk)
Shakib Al Hasan	Gautam Gambhir	Shakib Al Hasan	Wasim Jaffer
Shahadat Hossain	Dinesh Karthik	Shahadat Hossain	Dinesh Karthik
Tamim Iqbal	Zaheer Khan	Mehrab Hossain Jr	Zaheer Khan
Mashrafe Mortaza	Dinesh Mongia	Tushar Imran	Anil Kumble
Javed Omar	Munaf Patel	Mashrafe Mortaza	V. V. S. Laxman
Shahriar Nafees	Ramesh Powar	Shahriar Nafees	Munaf Patel
Mohammad Rafique	R. P. Singh	Javed Omar	Rajesh Pawar
Syed Rasel	Yuvraj Singh	Mohammad Rafique	Ramesh Powar
Abdur Razzak	Shanthakumaran Sreesanth	Syed Rasel	Ishant Sharma
Farhad Reza	Manoj Tiwary	Rajin Saleh	R. P. Singh
	Robin Uthappa		V. R. V. Singh
			Yuvraj Singh
			Shanthakumaran Sreesanth

== Series and pre-series events ==
=== India ===
- 4 April 2007: Greg Chappell resigns from his post of Indian national team coach.
- 7 April 2007: Rahul Dravid retained as the Captain of the Test and ODI squad for three series, starting with India's tour of Bangladesh.
- 7 April 2007: Ravi Shastri appointed as the coach of the Indian team for the Bangladesh tour. Venkatesh Prasad and Robin Singh appointed as coaches for bowling and fielding respectively.
- 20 April 2007: Sachin Tendulkar and Sourav Ganguly rested from the ODI squad but retained in the test squad. Harbhajan Singh, Irfan Pathan and Ajit Agarkar were dropped from both the squads. Virender Sehwag was dropped from the test squad but retained in the ODI squad. Three Debutants for the tour – Manoj Tiwari and Piyush Chawla in the ODI squad and Rajesh Pawar in the test squad.
- 8 May 2007: Manoj Tiwari's shoulder injury during practice in Dhaka sidelines hims for the ODI series. No replacements were sought by the team.
- 15 May 2007: S Sreesanth returns home with a calf muscle injury. RP Singh was retained as his replacement.
- 17 May 2007: Sachin Tendulkar was appointed vice-captain of the Indian test team for the Bangladesh series on the eve of the first Test match.
- 17 May 2007: Munaf Patel leaves the tour on the first day of the first Test following injury. Ishant Sharma is called up to replace him.

=== Bangladesh ===
- 20 April 2007: Bangladesh national cricket coach Dav Whatmore resigns from his post effective at the end of the India tour of Bangladesh.
- 30 April 2007: Mohammad Ashraful is appointed as the vice-captain for the ODI squad. The selectors announce only the ODI squad and take a decision to name the Test squad after the end of the ODI series.
- 12 May 2007: Bangladesh announce their test squad side following the loss of the ODI series. Aftab Ahmed, Abdur Razzak dropped alongside wicket-keeper Mushfiqur Rahim who has been replaced by veteran Khaled Mashud, who had been left out of the World Cup team.

== ODI series ==
=== 1st ODI ===
10 May 2007
(scorecard)

Bangladesh; 250/7 (47/47 overs)	v	India; 251/5 (46/47 overs)
Javed Omar 80 (117); Dinesh Mongia 3/49 (10 overs)		MS Dhoni 93* (106); Shakib Al Hasan 2/43 (9 overs)

India won by 5 wickets (D/L)
Sher-e-Bangla Cricket Stadium, Dhaka
Umpires: Asoka de Silva (SRI) and Nadir Shah (Ban)
Player of the match: MS Dhoni (IND)

- Match reduced to 47 overs a side due to rain; Duckworth-Lewis revised target to win: 251 runs in 47 overs for India.

=== 2nd ODI ===
12 May 2007
(scorecard)

India; 284/8 (49 overs)	v	Bangladesh; 238/9 (49 overs)
Gautam Gambhir 101 (113); Mohammad Rafique 3/59 (10 overs)		Habibul Bashar 43 (88); Piyush Chawla 3/37 (10 overs)

India won by 46 runs (D/L)
Sher-e-Bangla Cricket Stadium, Dhaka
Umpires: Asoka de Silva (SL) and Enamul Haque (Ban)
Player of the match: Gautam Gambhir (Ind)

- Match reduced to 49 overs a side due to rain; Duckworth-Lewis revised target to win: 285 runs in 49 overs for Bangladesh.

Gautam Gambhir's 101 was the first century to be made at the Sher-e-Bangla Mirpur Stadium and went on to help India to make the highest team total scored on the ground.

=== 3rd ODI ===
15 May 2007
Scorecard

India	v	Bangladesh

No result
Zohur Ahmed Chowdhury Stadium, Chittagong
Umpires: Asoka de Silva (SL) and Enamul Haque (Ban)

- Match abandoned due to rain.

The pitch was washed out due to heavy rain from the previous two days, along with heavy winds from Cyclone Akash taking their toll on the ground conditions. Four and a half hours after the planned start time the umpires called off the match, anticipating another 2 hours from 13:00 (BST) would be needed – not leaving enough time for the minimum of 20 overs each to be played. The presentation of awards, including most wickets taken (picked up by Syed Rasel of Bangladesh), most runs scored and player of the series (both won by MS Dhoni of India), were handed out at the ground later in the day.

== Test series ==
=== 1st test ===
18–22 May 2007
Scorecard

India	v	Bangladesh
387/6d (97 overs); Sachin Tendulkar 101 (169); Mashrafe Mortaza 4/97 (24.5 overs)		238 (68.2 overs); Mashrafe Mortaza 79 (91); VRV Singh 3/45 (17 overs)
100/6d (24 overs); Sachin Tendulkar 31 (50); Mohammad Rafique 3/27 (8 overs)		104/2 (28 overs); Javed Omar 52* (80); Ramesh Powar 1/16 (7 overs)

Match drawn
Zohur Ahmed Chowdhury Stadium, Chittagong
Umpires: Billy Doctrove (WI) and Daryl Harper (Aus)
Player of the match: Mashrafe Mortaza (Ban)

- Only one session played on day 2 due to a wet outfield.
- Day 3 washed out due to heavy rain.
- Delayed start to day 5 due to heavy rain.
- Shakib Al Hasan (Ban) and Ramesh Powar (Ind) made their Test debuts.

=== 2nd test ===
25–29 May 2007
Scorecard

India	v	Bangladesh
610/3d (153 overs); Wasim Jaffer 138* (229); Mohammad Rafique 2/181 (45 overs)		118 (37.2 overs); Shakib Al Hasan 30 (47); Zaheer Khan 5/34 (10 overs)
		253 (57.3 overs); Mashrafe Mortaza 70; Ramesh Powar 3/33 (16 overs)

India won by an innings and 239 runs
Sher-e-Bangla Cricket Stadium, Dhaka
Umpires: Billy Doctrove (WI) and Daryl Harper (Aus)
Player of the match: Zaheer Khan (Ind)

- Ishant Sharma (Ind) made his Test debut.
