= International cricket in 2007 =

Cricket season

The 2007 international cricket season was between April and September 2007.

== Season overview ==
International tours
Start date	Home team	Away team	Results [Matches]		
Start date	Home team	Away team	Test	ODI	T20I
10 May 2007	Bangladesh	India	0–1 [2]	0–2 [3]	—
17 May 2007	England	West Indies	3–0 [4]	1–2 [3]	1–1 [2]
25 June 2007	Sri Lanka	Bangladesh	3–0 [3]	3–0 [3]	—
1 July 2007	Scotland	Pakistan	—	0–0 [1]	—
19 July 2007	England	India	0–1 [3]	4–3 [7]	—
16 August 2007	Scotland	India	—	0–1 [1]	—
22 August 2007	Zimbabwe	South Africa	—	0–3 [3]	—
Other international series
Start date	Series			Winners	
18 May 2007	(United Arab Emirates) Abu Dhabi Series			Pakistan	
5 June 2007	(India) Afro-Asia Cup			Asia XI	
23 June 2007	(Northern Ireland) Future Cup			India	
3 July 2007	(Scotland) Future Friendship Cup			N/A	
10 July 2007	(Republic of Ireland) Quadrangular Series			West Indies	
Minor tours
Start date	Home team	Away team	Results [Matches]		
Start date	Home team	Away team	First-class		ODI
28 June 2007	Canada	Netherlands	0–1 [1]		0–1 [2]
13 August 2007	Netherlands	Bermuda	1–0 [1]		2–0 [2]
Minor tournaments
Start date	Tournament			Winners	
27 May 2007	(Australia) ICC World Cricket League Division Three			Uganda	

== Pre-season rankings ==
ICC Test Championship 28 January 2007
Rank	Team	Matches	Points	Rating
1	Australia	43	5807	135
2	England	47	5344	114
3	Pakistan	38	4092	108
4	India	38	4056	107
5	Sri Lanka	36	3686	102
5	South Africa	42	4274	102
7	New Zealand	28	2602	93
8	West Indies	33	2378	72
9	Zimbabwe	15	415	28
10	Bangladesh	22	48	2
Reference: ICC, 28 January 2007

ICC ODI Championship 29 April 2007
Rank	Team	Matches	Points	Rating
1	Australia	54	7038	130
2	South Africa	43	5313	124
3	New Zealand	45	5103	113
4	Sri Lanka	53	5879	111
5	Pakistan	36	5450	110
6	India	50	5320	95
7	England	43	4457	104
8	West Indies	47	4666	99
9	Bangladesh	42	1892	45
10	Ireland	11	317	29
11	Zimbabwe	36	779	22
12	Kenya	11	0	0
Reference: ICC, 29 April 2007

== May ==
=== India in Bangladesh ===
No.	Date	Home captain	Away captain	Venue	Result
ODI series
ODI 2582	10 May	Habibul Bashar	Rahul Dravid	Sher-e-Bangla Cricket Stadium, Dhaka	India by 5 wickets
ODI 2583	12 May	Habibul Bashar	Rahul Dravid	Sher-e-Bangla Cricket Stadium, Dhaka	India by 46 runs
ODI 2583a	15 May	Habibul Bashar	Rahul Dravid	Bir Shrestha Shahid Ruhul Amin Stadium, Chittagong	Match abandoned
Test series
Test 1832	18–22 May	Habibul Bashar	Rahul Dravid	Bir Shrestha Shahid Ruhul Amin Stadium, Chittagong	Match drawn
Test 1833	25–29 May	Habibul Bashar	Rahul Dravid	Sher-e-Bangla Cricket Stadium, Dhaka	India by an innings and 239 runs

=== West Indies in England ===
No.	Date	Home captain	Away captain	Venue	Result
Test series
Test 1831	17–21 May	Andrew Strauss	Ramnaresh Sarwan	Lord's, London	Match drawn
Test 1834	25–29 May	Michael Vaughan	Ramnaresh Sarwan	Headingley, Leeds	England by an innings and 283 runs
Test 1835	7–11 June	Michael Vaughan	Daren Ganga	Old Trafford, Manchester	England by 60 runs
Test 1836	15–19 June	Michael Vaughan	Daren Ganga	Riverside Ground, Chester-le-Street	England by 7 wickets
T20I series
T20I 15	28 June	Paul Collingwood	Chris Gayle	The Oval, London	West Indies by 15 runs
T20I 16	29 June	Paul Collingwood	Chris Gayle	The Oval London	England by 5 wickets
ODI series
ODI 2594	1 July	Paul Collingwood	Chris Gayle	Lord's, London	England by 79 runs
ODI 2597	4 July	Paul Collingwood	Chris Gayle	Edgbaston, Birmingham	West Indies by 61 runs
ODI 2598	7 July	Paul Collingwood	Chris Gayle	Trent Bridge, Nottingham	West Indies by 93 runs

=== Abu Dhabi Series ===
No.	Date	Sri Lanka captain	Pakistan captain	Venue	Result
ODI series
ODI 2584	18 May	Mahela Jayawardene	Shoaib Malik	Sheikh Zayed Cricket Stadium, Abu Dhabi	Pakistan by 5 wickets
ODI 2585	20 May	Mahela Jayawardene	Shoaib Malik	Sheikh Zayed Cricket Stadium, Abu Dhabi	Pakistan by 98 runs
ODI 2586	22 May	Mahela Jayawardene	Shoaib Malik	Sheikh Zayed Cricket Stadium, Abu Dhabi	Sri Lanka by 115 runs

=== World Cricket League Division Three ===
==== Group stage ====
27–6 May June in Darwin, Australia.

Group A
Pos	Team	Pld	W	L	T	NR	Pts	NRR
1	Argentina	3	2	1	0	0	4	1.200
2	Papua New Guinea	3	2	1	0	0	4	0.176
3	Italy	3	2	1	0	0	4	−0.139
4	Fiji	3	0	3	0	0	0	−1.361

Group B
Pos	Team	Pld	W	L	T	NR	Pts	NRR
1	Uganda	3	3	0	0	0	6	1.493
2	Cayman Islands	3	2	1	0	0	4	1.030
3	Tanzania	3	1	2	0	0	2	−0.767
4	Hong Kong	3	0	3	0	0	0	−1.926

No.	Date	Team 1	Team 2	Venue	Result
Match 1	27 May	Papua New Guinea	Fiji	Power Park, Darwin	Papua New Guinea by 1 wicket
Match 2	27 May	Italy	Argentina	Gardens Oval, Darwin	Italy by 1 run
Match 3	27 May	Uganda	Hong Kong	Kahlin Oval, Darwin	Uganda by 90 runs
Match 4	27 May	Cayman Islands	Tanzania	Tracy Village, Darwin	Cayman Islands by 10 wickets
Match 5	28 May	Papua New Guinea	Argentina	Gardens Oval, Darwin	Argentina by 5 wickets
Match 6	28 May	Fiji	Italy	Marrara Oval No. 1, Darwin	Italy by 37 runs
Match 7	28 May	Uganda	Tanzania	Nightcliff Oval, Darwin	Uganda by 4 wickets
Match 8	28 May	Hong Kong	Cayman Islands	Power Park, Darwin	Cayman Islands by 8 wickets
Match 9	30 May	Papua New Guinea	Italy	Nightcliff Oval, Darwin	Papua New Guinea by 8 wickets
Match 10	30 May	Fiji	Argentina	Kahlin Oval, Darwin	Argentina by 10 wickets
Match 11	30 May	Uganda	Cayman Islands	Marrara Oval No. 1, Darwin	Uganda by 26 runs
Match 12	30 May	Hong Kong	Tanzania	Tracy Village, Darwin	Tanzania by 5 wickets

==== Plate Championship ====
No.	Date	Team 1	Team 2	Venue	Result
Plate Semi–Finals
P SF1	31 May	Italy	Hong Kong	Tracy Village, Darwin	Hong Kong by 49 runs
P SF2	31 May	Fiji	Tanzania	Marrara Oval No. 1, Darwin	Tanzania by 3 wickets
Plate seventh place playoff
7th place	2 June	Italy	Fiji	Nightcliff Oval, Darwin	Italy by 6 wickets
Plate Final
5th place	2 June	Hong Kong	Tanzania	Power Park Darwin	Hong Kong by 129 runs

==== Championship ====
No.	Date	Team 1	Team 2	Venue	Result
Semi-Finals
SF1	31 May	Argentina	Cayman Islands	Gardens Oval, Darwin	Argentina by 4 wickets
SF2	31 May	Papua New Guinea	Uganda	Kahlin Oval, Darwin	Uganda by 1 wicket
Third place playoff
3rd place	2 June	Papua New Guinea	Cayman Islands	Marrara Oval No. 1, Darwin	Papua New Guinea by 23 runs
Final
Final	2 June	Argentina	Uganda	Gardens Oval, Darwin	Uganda by 91 runs

== June ==
=== Australian in Zimbabwe ===
The Australian team were due to play 3 ODIs in Zimbabwe, but the tour was cancelled in mid-May by their government following John Howard's order. Howard proclaimed the tour going ahead would be an "enormous propaganda boost" to Robert Mugabe. Cricket Australia was considering the option of holding the planned matches in a neutral location, but the Zimbabwean government quickly ruled out the possibility of the matches being played outside of Zimbabwe. On 15 May, the tour was officially cancelled.

=== Afro-Asia Cup ===
No.	Date	Home captain	Away captain	Venue	Result
T20
T20	5 June	Shoaib Malik	Tanmay Mishra	M. Chinnaswamy Stadium, Bangalore	Asia by 6 wickets
ODI series
ODI 2587	6 June	Mahela Jayawardene	Justin Kemp	M. Chinnaswamy Stadium, Bangalore	Asia by 34 runs
ODI 2588	9 June	Mahela Jayawardene	Justin Kemp	M.A. Chidambaram Stadium, Chennai	Asia by 31 runs
ODI 2589	10 June	Mahela Jayawardene	Justin Kemp	M.A. Chidambaram Stadium, Chennai	Asia by 13 runs

=== Future Cup ===
No.	Date	Team 1	Team 2	Venue	Result
ODI series
ODI 2590	23 June	Ireland	India	Civil Service Cricket Club, Belfast	India by 9 wickets
ODI 2591	24 June	Ireland	South Africa	Civil Service Cricket Club, Belfast	South Africa by 42 runs
ODI 2592	26 June	India	South Africa	Civil Service Cricket Club, Belfast	South Africa by 4 wickets
ODI 2593	29 June	India	South Africa	Civil Service Cricket Club, Belfast	India by 6 wickets
ODI 2595	1 July	India	South Africa	Civil Service Cricket Club, Belfast	India by 6 wickets

=== Bangladesh in Sri Lanka ===
No.	Date	Home captain	Away captain	Venue	Result
Test series
Test 1837	25–29 June	Mahela Jayawardene	Mohammad Ashraful	R. Premadasa Stadium, Colombo	Sri Lanka by an innings and 234 runs
Test 1838	3–7 July	Mahela Jayawardene	Mohammad Ashraful	P. Saravanamuttu Stadium, Colombo	Sri Lanka by an innings and 90 runs
Test 1839	11–15 July	Mahela Jayawardene	Mohammad Ashraful	Asgiriya Stadium, Kandy	Sri Lanka by an innings and 193 runs
ODI series
ODI 2605	20 July	Mahela Jayawardene	Mohammad Ashraful	P. Saravanamuttu Stadium, Colombo	Sri Lanka by 70 runs
ODI 2606	22 July	Mahela Jayawardene	Mohammad Ashraful	R. Premadasa Stadium, Colombo	Sri Lanka by 5 wickets
ODI 2607	24 July	Mahela Jayawardene	Mohammad Ashraful	R. Premadasa Stadium, Colombo	Sri Lanka by 39 runs

== July ==
=== Pakistan in Scotland ===
No.	Date	Home captain	Away captain	Venue	Result
ODI
ODI 2595a	1 July	Ryan Watson	Shoaib Malik	The Grange Cricket Club, Edinburgh	Match abandoned

=== Future Friendship Cup ===
No.	Date	Pakistan captain	India captain	Venue	Result
ODI
ODI 2595b	3 July	Shoaib Malik	Rahul Dravid	Titwood, Glasgow	Match abandoned

=== Netherlands in Canada ===
Netherlands played a 2 ODI series in Canada, as well as a First-class match as a part of the 2007–08 ICC Intercontinental Cup.

No.	Date	Home captain	Away captain	Venue	Result
ODI series
ODI 2596	3 July	Ashish Bagai	Jeroen Smits	Toronto Cricket, Skating and Curling Club, Toronto	Netherlands by 117 runs
ODI 2597a	4 July	Ashish Bagai	Jeroen Smits	Toronto Cricket, Skating and Curling Club, Toronto	Match abandoned

=== Quadrangular Series in Ireland ===
Pos	Team	Pld	W	L	T	NR	BP	Pts	NRR
1	West Indies	3	2	0	0	1	1	11	2.521
2	Ireland	3	2	0	0	1	0	10	0.240
3	Scotland	3	0	2	0	1	0	2	−0.310
4	Netherlands	3	0	2	0	1	0	2	−1.637

ODI tournament
No.	Date	Team 1	Team 2	Venue	Result
ODI 2599	10 July	Netherlands	West Indies	Clontarf Cricket Club Ground, Dublin	West Indies by 10 wickets
ODI 2600	11 July	Ireland	Netherlands	Civil Service Cricket Club, Belfast	Ireland by 1 run
ODI 2601	12 July	West Indies	Scotland	Clontarf Cricket Club Ground, Dublin	West Indies by 4 wickets
ODI 2602	13 July	Scotland	Netherlands	Civil Service Cricket Club, Belfast	Match abandoned
ODI 2603	14 July	Ireland	West Indies	Clontarf Cricket Club Ground, Dublin	Match abandoned
ODI 2604	15 July	Ireland	Scotland	Civil Service Cricket Club, Belfast	Ireland by 23 runs

=== India in England ===
No.	Date	Home captain	Away captain	Venue	Result
Test series
Test 1840	19–23 July	Michael Vaughan	Rahul Dravid	Lord's, London	Match drawn
Test 1841	27–31 July	Michael Vaughan	Rahul Dravid	Trent Bridge, Nottingham	India by 7 wickets
Test 1842	9–13 August	Michael Vaughan	Rahul Dravid	The Oval, London	Match drawn
ODI series
ODI 2611	21 August	Paul Collingwood	Rahul Dravid	The Rose Bowl, Southampton	England by 104 runs
ODI 2613	24 August	Paul Collingwood	Rahul Dravid	County Cricket Ground, Bristol	India by 9 runs
ODI 2616	27 August	Paul Collingwood	Rahul Dravid	Edgbaston, Birmingham	England by 42 runs
ODI 2617	30 August	Paul Collingwood	Rahul Dravid	Old Trafford, Manchester	England by 3 wickets
ODI 2618	2 September	Paul Collingwood	Rahul Dravid	Headingley, Leeds	India by 38 runs (D/L)
ODI 2619	5 September	Paul Collingwood	Rahul Dravid	The Oval, London	India by 2 wickets
ODI 2620	8 September	Paul Collingwood	Rahul Dravid	Lord's, London	England by 7 wickets

== August ==
=== India in Scotland ===
No.	Date	Home captain	Away captain	Venue	Result
ODI
ODI 2608	16 August	Ryan Watson	Rahul Dravid	Titwood, Glasgow	India by 7 wickets

=== Bermuda in the Netherlands ===
No.	Date	Home captain	Away captain	Venue	Result
ODI series
ODI 2609	18 August	Jeroen Smits	Irving Romaine	Hazelaarweg, Rotterdam	Netherlands by 172 runs
ODI 2610	20 August	Jeroen Smits	Irving Romaine	Hazelaarweg, Rotterdam	Netherlands by 8 wickets

=== South Africa in Zimbabwe ===
No.	Date	Home captain	Away captain	Venue	Result
ODI series
ODI 2612	22 August	Prosper Utseya	Graeme Smith	Queens Sports Club, Bulawayo	South Africa by 5 wkts
ODI 2614	25 August	Prosper Utseya	Graeme Smith	Harare Sports Club, Harare	South Africa by 8 wkts
ODI 2615	26 August	Prosper Utseya	Graeme Smith	Harare Sports Club, Harare	South Africa by 28 runs

== See also ==
- 2007 in cricket
- International Cricket Series News
