= October 2007 in sports =

<<	October 2007					>>
Su	Mo	Tu	We	Th	Fr	Sa
	1	2	3	4	5	6
7	8	9	10	11	12	13
14	15	16	17	18	19	20
21	22	23	24	25	26	27
28	29	30	31
Sports

This list shows notable sports-related deaths, events, and notable outcomes that occurred in October of 2007.

== Deaths ==
- 29: Christian d'Oriola
- 21: Max McGee
- 20: Jim Mitchell
- 8: John Henry (horse)
- 7: Norifumi Abe
- 1: Al Oerter
- 1: Chris Mainwaring

== Sporting seasons ==
- American football
  - NCAA Division I FBS
  - National Football League
- Auto racing 2007:
  - Champ Car
  - NASCAR NEXTEL Cup
  - NASCAR Busch Series
  - NASCAR Craftsman Truck Series
  - World Rally Championship
  - V8 Supercar
  - Le Mans Series
  - A1 Grand Prix
- Baseball 2007
  - Major League Baseball
  - Nippon Professional Baseball
  - Chinese Professional Baseball League (Taiwan)
- Basketball 2007
  - British Basketball League
  - Euroleague
  - National Basketball Association
  - Philippine Basketball Association
    - Philippine Cup
- Canadian football:
  - Canadian Football League
- Cricket 2007:
  - England
- Cycling
  - UCI ProTour
- Association football (soccer) 2006–07:
  - Major League Soccer
- Association football (soccer) 2007–08:
  - England
  - Italy
  - Germany
  - Spain
  - France
  - Argentina
  - Denmark
- Golf:
  - 2007 LPGA Tour
- Ice hockey 2007–08
  - National Hockey League
- Rugby union:
  - 2007:
    - Air New Zealand Cup
    - Australian Rugby Championship
    - Currie Cup
  - 2007–08:
    - English Premiership
    - Celtic League
    - Top 14

== 31 October 2007 (Wednesday) ==
- Baseball:
  - 2007 Japan Series
    - Game 4: Chunichi Dragons 4, Hokkaido Nippon Ham Fighters 2. Dragons lead series 3–1.
- Basketball:
  - 2007–08 NBA season – Season Openers
    - Indiana Pacers 119, Washington Wizards 110 (OT)
    - Orlando Magic 102, Milwaukee Bucks 83
    - Toronto Raptors 106, Philadelphia 76ers 97
    - New Jersey Nets 112, Chicago Bulls 103
    - Dallas Mavericks 92, Cleveland Cavaliers 74
    - San Antonio Spurs 104, Memphis Grizzlies 101
    - New Orleans Hornets 104, Sacramento Kings 90
    - Denver Nuggets 120, Seattle SuperSonics 103

== 30 October 2007 (Tuesday) ==
- Baseball:
  - 2007 Japan Series
    - Game 3: Chunichi Dragons 9, Hokkaido Nippon Ham Fighters 1. Dragons lead series 2–1.
  - Major League Baseball:
    - The New York Yankees sign Joe Girardi to a three-year contract as the team's new manager. (ESPN.com)
    - Grady Little resigns as Los Angeles Dodgers manager amid rumors that former Yankees manager Joe Torre will soon be signed. (ESPN.com)
- Basketball:
  - 2007–08 NBA season – Season Openers
    - San Antonio Spurs 106, Portland Trail Blazers 97
    - Utah Jazz 117, Golden State Warriors 96
    - Houston Rockets 95, Los Angeles Lakers 93
- Football (soccer):
  - FIFA announces that Brazil will host the 2014 FIFA World Cup and Germany will host the 2011 FIFA Women's World Cup.

== 29 October 2007 (Monday) ==
- American football
  - National Football League Week 8:
    - Green Bay Packers 19, Denver Broncos 13 (OT)
      - Brett Favre connects with Greg Jennings for an 82-yard touchdown pass on the first play from scrimmage in overtime.
- Rugby union:
  - Jake White, who coached South Africa to the 2007 Rugby World Cup title, resigns as Springboks head coach, effective at the end of 2007. (South African Rugby Union)
- Cricket:
  - South African cricket team in Pakistan in 2007–08
    - South Africa 233/9 (50 ov.) beat Pakistan 219 (46.3 ov.) by 14 runs

== 28 October 2007 (Sunday) ==
- American football
  - National Football League Week 8:
    - Philadelphia Eagles 23, Minnesota Vikings 16
    - Cleveland Browns 27, St. Louis Rams 20
    - New York Giants 13, Miami Dolphins 10 (at Wembley Stadium in London)
    - Pittsburgh Steelers 24, Cincinnati Bengals 13
    - Tennessee Titans 13, Oakland Raiders 9
    - Indianapolis Colts 31, Carolina Panthers 7
      - The Colts become the first team since the 1929–31 Green Bay Packers to start three straight seasons 7–0. Quarterback Peyton Manning throws two touchdowns to break Johnny Unitas' franchise record for career touchdown passes.
    - Detroit Lions 16, Chicago Bears 7
    - Jacksonville Jaguars 24, Tampa Bay Buccaneers 23
    - San Diego Chargers 35, Houston Texans 10
    - Buffalo Bills 13, New York Jets 3
    - New Orleans Saints 31, San Francisco 49ers 10
    - New England Patriots 52, Washington Redskins 7
      - The Patriots go to 8–0, setting up a matchup between two unbeaten teams when they travel to Indianapolis next week.
  - In the same week, Peyton Manning and Tom Brady become the first quarterbacks to have beaten 31 of the 32 current NFL teams. Obviously, since both are with their original team, neither have beaten their own team.
- Auto racing:
  - NASCAR: Pep Boys Auto 500 at Hampton, Georgia:
  (1) Jimmie Johnson (2) Carl Edwards (3) Reed Sorenson
- Baseball:
  - 2007 World Series:
    - Game 4: Boston Red Sox 4, Colorado Rockies 3:
      - The Red Sox win their second World Series in four years. Series Most Valuable Player Mike Lowell scores from second on a Jason Varitek single in the fifth, then hits a solo home run in the seventh to give the Sox a 3–0 lead. Homers by Colorado's Brad Hawpe and Garrett Atkins, sandwiching a solo shot by Boston's Bobby Kielty, close the gap to 4–3. But Red Sox closer Jonathan Papelbon pitches 1 2/3 innings for his third save of the series. Red Sox win series 4–0.
  - 2007 Japan Series:
    - Game 2: Chunichi Dragons 8, Hokkaido Nippon Ham Fighters 1. Series even 1–1.
  - Other news:
    - Scott Boras, the agent for Alex Rodriguez, announces that A-Rod will exercise his option to void the last four years of his contract with the New York Yankees and will become a free agent.

== 27 October 2007 (Saturday) ==
- American football
  - NCAA Division I FBS AP Top 25:
    - (1) Ohio State 37, (24) Penn State 17
    - (5) Oregon 24, (9) USC 17
    - (6) West Virginia 31, (25) Rutgers 3
    - (7) Arizona State 31, (18) California 20
    - (20) Georgia 42, (9) Florida 30 at Jacksonville Municipal Stadium (Florida vs. Georgia Football Classic)
    - Connecticut 22, (11) South Florida 15
      - The Huskies defeat a ranked team for the first time in 11 attempts as a Division I-A/FBS team.
    - (12) Kansas 19, Texas A&M 11
      - The Jayhawks go to 8–0 for the first time since 1909.
    - (13) Missouri 42, Iowa State 28
    - Mississippi State 31, (14) Kentucky 14
    - Tennessee 27, (15) South Carolina 24 (OT)
    - (16) Hawaiʻi 50, New Mexico State 13
    - (17) Texas 28, Nebraska 25
    - (19) Michigan 34, Minnesota 10 (Little Brown Jug)
    - NC State 29, (21) Virginia 24
    - (23) Auburn 17, Mississippi 3
- Baseball:
  - 2007 World Series
    - Game 3: Boston Red Sox 10, Colorado Rockies 5. The Bosox slay the "Dragon Slayer" Josh Fogg with six runs in the third inning, let the Rockies back in the game with a five-run sixth, but pull away. The Sox are led on offense by Jacoby Ellsbury, the first rookie since 1936 with four hits in a Series game, and Dustin Pedroia, with three hits of his own. Red Sox lead series 3–0.
  - 2007 Japan Series
    - Game 1: Hokkaido Nippon Ham Fighters 3, Chunichi Dragons 1. Fighters lead series 1–0.
- Football (soccer):
  - MLS Cup 2007 – Conference Semifinals, first leg
    - New England Revolution 0–0 New York Red Bulls
    - Chivas USA 0–1 Kansas City Wizards
    - Houston Dynamo 0–1 FC Dallas
- Horse racing: 2007 Breeders' Cup at Monmouth Park
  - Curlin wins the Breeders' Cup Classic in a powerful stretch drive, defeating his major rivals for U.S. Horse of the Year honors in Street Sense and Lawyer Ron. For the second straight year, a Breeders' Cup race is marred by tragedy, as European star George Washington shatters an ankle in the Classic and is put down on the track. Other winners:
  - Juvenile Fillies — Indian Blessing
  - Juvenile — War Pass
  - Filly & Mare Turf — Lahudood
  - Sprint — Midnight Lute
  - Turf Mile — Kip Deville
  - Distaff — Ginger Punch
  - Turf — English Channel
- Rugby union:
  - 2007 Currie Cup Final
    - Free State Cheetahs 20–18 Golden Lions at Bloemfontein

== 26 October 2007 (Friday) ==
- Horse racing: 2007 Breeders' Cup at Monmouth Park
  - Filly & Mare Sprint — Maryfield
  - Juvenile Turf — Nownownow
  - Dirt Mile — Corinthian

== 25 October 2007 (Thursday) ==
- American football: NCAA Division I FBS AP Top 25:
  - (2) Boston College 14, (8) Virginia Tech 10
    - Amidst rainy conditions in Blacksburg, the Eagles score two touchdowns in the last three minutes to overcome one of their major hurdles to an undefeated season.
- Baseball: 2007 World Series
  - Game 2: Boston Red Sox 2–1 Colorado Rockies, Red Sox lead series 2–0.
    - Mike Lowell proves to be the difference-maker for the Red Sox, scoring on a Jason Varitek sacrifice fly in the 4th inning and then driving David Ortiz in with a double in the 5th. Matt Holliday provides four of the Rockies' five hits, but is picked off at first in the 8th inning by Jonathan Papelbon. Papelbon and Hideki Okajima, who first relieved Curt Schilling, combined for 3 2/3 innings of shutout relief, only giving up one hit to Holliday.
- Football (soccer):
  - MLS Cup 2007 – Conference Semifinals, first leg
    - D.C. United 0–1 Chicago Fire

== 24 October 2007 (Wednesday) ==
- Baseball: 2007 World Series
  - Game 1: Boston Red Sox 13–1 Colorado Rockies, Red Sox lead series, 1–0.
    - Dustin Pedroia leads off with a home run and the Sox never look back, handing the Rockies their first loss in ten games. Josh Beckett strikes out nine while giving up only one run in seven innings on the mound, while his counterpart Jeff Francis only lasted four innings, allowing six runs off ten hits.

== 22 October 2007 (Monday) ==
- American football
  - National Football League Week 7:
    - Indianapolis Colts 29, Jacksonville Jaguars 7
      - The Colts become the third team in NFL history to start three consecutive seasons at 6–0. Both David Garrard (sprained ankle) and Maurice Jones-Drew (sprained knee) were knocked out of the game for the Jags.
- Major League Baseball:
  - Tony La Russa agrees to a two-year deal to stay on as manager of the St. Louis Cardinals. (AP via ESPN.com)
- Football (soccer):
  - Despite only one loss out of 55 matches, Greg Ryan is sacked as coach of the USA women's national team. (AP via ESPNsoccernet)

== 21 October 2007 (Sunday) ==
- American football
  - National Football League Week 7:
    - Detroit Lions 23, Tampa Bay Buccaneers 16
    - Tennessee Titans 38, Houston Texans 36
      - The Titans blow a 32–7 fourth-quarter lead, but are rescued by their kicker Rob Bironas, who kicks the winning field goal as time expires. The winning field goal was his eighth of the game, setting an NFL record.
    - Washington Redskins 21, Arizona Cardinals 19
    - New England Patriots 49, Miami Dolphins 28
      - Tom Brady throws five of his six touchdown passes in the first half as the Pats romp.
    - New York Giants 33, San Francisco 49ers 15
    - Buffalo Bills 19, Baltimore Ravens 14
    - New Orleans Saints 22, Atlanta Falcons 16
    - Cincinnati Bengals 38, New York Jets 31
    - Kansas City Chiefs 12, Oakland Raiders 10
    - Chicago Bears 19, Philadelphia Eagles 16
    - Seattle Seahawks 33, St. Louis Rams 6
    - Dallas Cowboys 24, Minnesota Vikings 14
    - Denver Broncos 31, Pittsburgh Steelers 28
      - The Steelers come back from a 28–14 fourth-quarter deficit, but Jason Elam kicks the game-winning field goal as time expires.
- Auto racing:
  - Formula One: Brazilian Grand Prix at Interlagos, São Paulo:
  (1) Kimi Räikkönen (Finland) (2) Felipe Massa (Brazil) (3) Fernando Alonso (Spain) .
  Lewis Hamilton finishes 7th in the final race of the season, with the result that Kimi Räikkönen wins the Drivers Championship with 110 points, followed by Hamilton and Alonso, both on 109 points.
  - NASCAR: Subway 500 at Martinsville, Virginia:
  (1) Jimmie Johnson (2) Ryan Newman (3) Jeff Gordon
  This race sees 21 cautions, with more than one-fourth of the race (127 out of 506 laps) run under yellow, and ends with a caution during an overtime lap. Johnson's win closes his deficit to teammate Gordon in the Chase to 53 points.
  - Champ Car: Lexmark Indy 300 at Surfers Paradise, Queensland, Australia:
  (1) Sébastien Bourdais (France) (2) Justin Wilson (United Kingdom) (3) Bruno Junqueira (Brazil)
  The win wraps up Bourdais' fourth consecutive title.
  - Motorcycle GP: Malaysian motorcycle Grand Prix at Sepang, Malaysia:
  (1) Casey Stoner (Australia) (2) Marco Melandri (Italy) (3) Dani Pedrosa (Spain)
  - V8 Supercar: V8 Supercar Challenge at Surfers Paradise, Queensland, Australia:
  (1) Garth Tander (Australia) (2) Russell Ingall (Australia) (3) Jason Richards (New Zealand)
- Baseball:
  - 2007 American League Championship Series Game 7:
    - Boston Red Sox 11, Cleveland Indians 2. The Bosox punch their ticket to the World Series, led on offense by Dustin Pedroia, who hits a two-run homer in the seventh inning to break open a close game, and a three-run double in the eighth to help put the game out of reach. Daisuke Matsuzaka pitches five innings, and Hideki Okajima and Jonathan Papelbon each pitch two innings of scoreless relief. Red Sox win series 4–3.
- Rugby union: 2007 IRB Awards
  - IRB International Player of the Year: Bryan Habana, South Africa
  - IRB International Team of the Year: South Africa
  - IRB International Coach of the Year: Jake White, South Africa
  - IRB Sevens Player of the Year: Afeleke Pelenise, New Zealand
  - IRB Sevens Team of the Year: New Zealand
  - IRPA Try of the Year: Takudzwa Ngwenya, United States
  - For other awards, see the main IRB Awards article.

== 20 October 2007 (Saturday) ==
- American football
  - NCAA Division I FBS AP Top 25:
    - (1) Ohio State 24, Michigan State 17
    - (4) Oklahoma 17, Iowa State 7
    - (5) LSU 30, (18) Auburn 24
    - Vanderbilt 17, (6) South Carolina 6
    - (7) Oregon 55, Washington 34
    - (14) Florida 45, (8) Kentucky 37
    - (9) West Virginia 38, Mississippi State 13
    - UCLA 30, (10) California 21
    - (13) USC 38, Notre Dame 0
    - (15) Kansas 19, Colorado 14
    - (15) Missouri 41, (22) Texas Tech 10
    - (19) Texas 31, Baylor 10
    - Alabama 41, (20) Tennessee 17
    - Pittsburgh 24, (23) Cincinnati 17
    - (24) Michigan 27, Illinois 17
    - Oklahoma State 41, (25) Kansas State 39
- Baseball:
  - 2007 American League Championship Series Game 6:
    - Boston Red Sox 12, Cleveland Indians 2 — J. D. Drew hits a grand slam in the first inning to open the scoring, and the Bosox go on to blow out the Tribe and force Game 7. Series even 3–3.
- Rugby union:
  - 2007 Rugby World Cup Final: England 6–15 South Africa at Paris – Saint Denis
    - A hard-fought kicking game results in the Springboks winning their first World Cup since 1995, although England supporters will regret a disallowed try when the score was 3–9.
  - 2007 Air New Zealand Cup Final:
    - Auckland 23–14 Wellington at Eden Park
- Cricket:
  - Australian cricket team in India in 2007–08
    - Only T20:India 167/3 (18.1 ov.) beat Australia 166/5 (20 ov.) by 7 wickets
  - South African cricket team in Pakistan in 2007–08
    - 2nd ODI:Pakistan 265/9 (50 ov.) beat South Africa 240 (49.3 ov.) by 25 runs

== 19 October 2007 (Friday) ==
- Rugby union: 2007 Rugby World Cup:
  - Bronze Final: France 10–34 Argentina at Paris
    - In a rematch of the opening game of the Rugby World Cup, Argentina repeat their victory over hosts France to take overall third place in the competition and world rankings, their best result ever.

== 18 October 2007 (Thursday) ==
- Baseball:
  - 2007 American League Championship Series Game 5:
    - Boston Red Sox 7, Cleveland Indians 1 — Josh Beckett strikes out 11 in eight innings of work, Manny Ramírez puts the Bosox ahead to stay in the third inning with a long single that barely missed being a homer, and the Red Sox pull away late to bring the series back to Fenway Park. Indians lead series 3–2.
  - Non-playoff news:
    - After the New York Yankees offer their manager Joe Torre a one-year contract for US$5 million—a one-third pay cut from what he made in 2007—he chooses to resign after a 12-year tenure as manager in which he led the Yankees to the playoffs every season. (AP and ESPN.com)
- American football:
  - NCAA Division I FBS AP Top 25:
    - Rutgers 30, (2) South Florida 27
- Cricket:
  - South African cricket team in Pakistan in 2007–08:
    - South Africa 294/5 (50 ov.) beat Pakistan 249 (46.3 ov.) by 45 runs

== 16 October 2007 (Tuesday) ==
- Baseball: 2007 MLB Postseason
  - 2007 American League Championship Series
    - Cleveland Indians 7, Boston Red Sox 3
      - The Indians score all of their runs in a fifth inning extended when Red Sox first baseman Kevin Youkilis drops a foul ball. Youkilis, David Ortiz and Manny Ramírez hit consecutive home runs in the sixth, but the Indians bullpen turns in another solid performance to close the game. Paul Byrd picks up the win for the Tribe. Indians lead series, 3–1
- Cricket:
  - Australian cricket team in India in 2007–08
    - India 195/8 (46 ov.) beat Australia 193 (41.3 ov.) by 2 wickets

== 15 October 2007 (Monday) ==
- American football:
  - National Football League Week 6:
    - New York Giants 31, Atlanta Falcons 10
      - Eli Manning throws for 303 yards and two touchdowns as the Giants win their fourth straight game.
- Baseball: 2007 MLB Postseason
  - 2007 American League Championship Series
    - Cleveland Indians 4, Boston Red Sox 2: Kenny Lofton opens the scoring with a two-run homer. The Indians go ahead on an Asdrúbal Cabrera RBI single. Tribe starter Jake Westbrook and gives up only a two-run homer to Jason Varitek, while Cleveland's defense backs him up with three double plays. Indians lead series, 2–1.
  - 2007 National League Championship Series
    - Colorado Rockies 6, Arizona Diamondbacks 4: The Rockies get all their runs in the fourth inning, including a three-run shot from Matt Holliday, and hold on for the win and their first World Series appearance ever. Rockies win series 4–0.

== 14 October 2007 (Sunday) ==
- American football
  - National Football League Week 6:
    - Minnesota Vikings 34, Chicago Bears 31
      - Vikings running back Adrian Peterson rushes for 224 yards and three touchdowns. In addition, Peterson racked up a rookie record 361 all-purpose yards.
    - Cleveland Browns 41, Miami Dolphins 31
    - Green Bay Packers 17, Washington Redskins 14
    - Kansas City Chiefs 27, Cincinnati Bengals 20
    - Philadelphia Eagles 16, New York Jets 9
    - Tampa Bay Buccaneers 13, Tennessee Titans 10
    - Jacksonville Jaguars 37, Houston Texans 17
    - Baltimore Ravens 22, St. Louis Rams 3
    - Carolina Panthers 25, Arizona Cardinals 10
      - Vinny Testaverde, signed this week by the Panthers, becomes the oldest starting quarterback to win a game in NFL history. He also extends his record of consecutive seasons with at least one touchdown pass to 21.
    - New England Patriots 48, Dallas Cowboys 27
    - San Diego Chargers 28, Oakland Raiders 14
    - New Orleans Saints 28, Seattle Seahawks 17
- Auto racing:
  - A1 Grand Prix: A1 Grand Prix of Nations, Czech Republic at Brno Circuit, Czech Republic:
  (1) Jonny Reid (New Zealand) (2) Jeroen Bleekemolen (Netherlands) (3) Neel Jani (Switzerland)
  - MotoGP: Australian Grand Prix at Phillip Island, Australia:
  (1) Casey Stoner (Australia) (2) Loris Capirossi (Italy) (3) Valentino Rossi (Italy)
  - WRC: Rallye de France at Corsica, France:
  (1) Sébastien Loeb (France) (2) Marcus Grönholm (Finland) (3) Dani Sordo (Spain)
- Baseball: 2007 MLB Postseason
  - 2007 National League Championship Series
    - Colorado Rockies 4, Arizona Diamondbacks 1 — Yorvit Torrealba's three-run homer in the bottom of the sixth gives the Rockies their winning margin and puts them on the verge of their first-ever World Series appearance. Rockies lead series 3–0.
- Golf: Lorena Ochoa wins the LPGA Samsung World Championship in Palm Desert, California by four shots over Mi Hyun Kim, and in the process clinches her second straight LPGA Player of the Year award.
- Rugby union: 2007 Rugby World Cup Semi-finals:
  - SF2: South Africa 37–13 Argentina at Paris – Saint Denis
- Football (soccer):
  - 2010 FIFA World Cup qualification (CONMEBOL):
    - Colombia 0–0 Brazil
  - 2007 Military World Games:
    - Prelim Match: India beats Afghanistan 1–0 at AOC Grounds, Secunderabad, India
- Handball: 2007 Military World Games at Hyderabad, India
  - Prelim Match: India draws with Turkey 30–30
  - Prelim Match: South Korea beats Greece 30–28
- Cricket:
  - Australian cricket team in India in 2007–08
    - Australia 317/8 (50 ov.) beat India 299/7 (50 ov.) by 18 runs

== 13 October 2007 (Saturday) ==
- American football
  - NCAA Division I FBS AP Top 25:
    - (17) Kentucky 43, (1) LSU 37 (3 OT)
      - This is the first time since 2003 that a top-ranked team has lost a regular-season game.
    - Oregon State 31, (2) California 28
      - For the first time since 1996, both of the two top-ranked teams lose on the same day.
    - (3) Ohio State 48, Kent State 3
    - (4) Boston College 27, Notre Dame 14
    - (5) South Florida 64, UCF 12
    - (6) Oklahoma 41, (11) Missouri 31
    - (7) South Carolina 21, North Carolina 15
    - (9) Oregon 53, Washington State 7
    - (10) USC 20, Arizona 13
    - (12) Virginia Tech 43, Duke 14
    - Arizona State 44, Washington 20
    - Louisville 28, (15) Cincinnati 24
    - Iowa 10, (18) Illinois 6
    - Penn State 38, (19) Wisconsin 7
    - (20) Kansas 58, Baylor 10
    - (22) Auburn 9, Arkansas 7
    - (23) Texas 56, Iowa State 3
    - (24) Georgia 20, Vanderbilt 17
    - (25) Tennessee 33, Mississippi State 21
- Auto racing:
  - NASCAR: Bank of America 500 at Concord, North Carolina:
  (1) Jeff Gordon (2) Clint Bowyer (3) Kyle Busch
- Baseball: 2007 MLB Postseason
  - 2007 American League Championship Series
    - Cleveland Indians 13, Boston Red Sox 6 (11 innings)
      - After a back-and-forth first six innings, which ended with the teams tied at 6, no one scores until the Tribe explode for seven runs in the top of the 11th. This is the biggest score for one team in one extra inning in postseason history. Series even at 1–1.
  - Non-postseason news:
    - ESPN reports that Dusty Baker has signed a three-year deal to manage the Cincinnati Reds.
- Football
  - UEFA Euro 2008 qualifying
    - Group A
      - Armenia 0 – 0 Serbia
      - Poland 3 – 1 Kazakhstan
      - Belgium 0 – 0 Finland
      - Azerbaijan 0 – 2 Portugal
    - Group B
      - Scotland 3 – 1 Ukraine
      - Faroe Islands 0 – 6 France
      - Italy 2 – 0 Georgia
    - Group C
      - Hungary 2 – 0 Malta
      - Moldova 1 – 1 Turkey
      - Greece 3 – 2 Bosnia and Herzegovina
    - Group D
      - Slovakia 7 – 0 San Marino
      - Cyprus 3 – 1 Wales
      - Republic of Ireland 0 – 0 Germany
        Germany qualify for Euro 2008 Final tournament.
    - Group E
      - England 3 – 0 Estonia
      - Croatia 1 – 0 Israel
    - Group F
      - Iceland 2 – 4 Latvia
      - Liechtenstein 0 – 3 Sweden
      - Denmark 1 – 3 Spain
    - Group G
      - Belarus 0 – 1 Luxembourg
      - Romania 1 – 0 Netherlands
      - Slovenia 0 – 0 Albania
  - 2010 FIFA World Cup qualification (CONMEBOL):
    - Uruguay 5 – 0 Bolivia
    - Argentina 2 – 0 Chile
    - Ecuador 0 – 1 Venezuela
    - Peru 0 – 0 Paraguay
- Rugby league: Super League Grand Final
  - St. Helens 6–33 Leeds Rhinos at Old Trafford
- Rugby union:
  - 2007 Rugby World Cup Semi-finals:
    - SF1: England 14–9 France at Paris – Saint Denis
      - A tense match saw England take the lead six minutes from the end of the match. England go through to their second successive World Cup final, next weekend.
  - Australian Rugby Championship Grand Final
    - Central Coast Rays 20–12 Melbourne Rebels at Bluetongue Central Coast Stadium
- Cricket:
  - English cricket team in Sri Lanka in 2007–08
    - Sri Lanka 211 (48.1 ov.) beat England 104 (29.1 ov.) by 107 runs

== 12 October 2007 (Friday) ==
- American football
  - NCAA Division I FBS AP Top 25:
    - (16) Hawaiʻi 42, San Jose State 35 (OT)
- Baseball: 2007 MLB Postseason
  - 2007 American League Championship Series
    - Boston Red Sox 10, Cleveland Indians 3 — Josh Beckett gives up a first-inning homer to Travis Hafner, but settles down to give up only three more hits in 6 innings of work. In the meantime, the Bosox light up CC Sabathia for 8 runs in 4⅓ innings and win easily. Red Sox lead series 1–0.
  - 2007 National League Championship Series
    - Colorado Rockies 3, Arizona Diamondbacks 2 (11 innings), Rockies lead series 2–0
  - Non-playoff news:
    - An attorney for the firm representing MLB in its ongoing steroids investigation announces that former U.S. Senator George Mitchell will likely issue his report by the end of 2007. (AP via Yahoo!)
    - The Baltimore Orioles fire pitching coach Leo Mazzone, who in two seasons in Baltimore was unable to duplicate his enormous success from 1990 to 2005 in the same role with the Atlanta Braves. (AP via Yahoo!)
- Cricket
  - South African cricket team in Pakistan in 2007–08
    - 2nd Test-South Africa 357 & 305/4 (dec) drew Pakistan 206 & 316/4

== 11 October 2007 (Thursday) ==
- American football
  - NCAA Division I FBS AP Top 25:
    - Wake Forest 24, (21) Florida State 21
- Baseball: 2007 MLB Postseason
  - 2007 National League Championship Series
    - Colorado Rockies 5, Arizona Diamondbacks 1. The Rockies draw first blood in the NLCS in a game interrupted when Diamondbacks fans threw water bottles and other debris on the field to protest an interference call. Rockies lead series 1–0.
  - Non-postseason news:
    - Longtime Atlanta Braves general manager John Schuerholz steps aside in favor of his right-hand man, Frank Wren. Schuerholz will remain team president.
- Mixed martial arts:
  - UFC star Randy Couture announces his resignation from the promotion. This comes shortly after Fedor Emelianenko announces he will fight for the Russian M-1 Mixfight promotion. (Sherdog.com via ESPN.com)
- Cricket
  - Australian cricket team in India in 2007–08
    - Australia 149/1 (25.5 ov.) beat India 148 (39.4 ov.) by 9 wickets

== 10 October 2007 (Wednesday) ==
- Golf:
  - After nearly three decades on USA Network, American cable television rights to the opening two rounds of The Masters are transferred to ESPN in an announcement made at Augusta National Golf Club.

== 9 October 2007 (Tuesday) ==
- National Football League:
  - An arbitrator rules that Michael Vick must repay the Atlanta Falcons nearly US$20 million in signing bonuses paid by the team since 2004. The players union will appeal to the United States District Court for the District of Minnesota, which has had jurisdiction over all disputes between the league and union since a 1987 antitrust suit filed by the union. (AP via ESPN.com)

== 8 October 2007 (Monday) ==
- Athletics:
  - Marion Jones chooses not to wait for the International Olympic Committee to strip her of her five medals from the 2000 Summer Olympics, returning them to officials from the United States Olympic Committee, who will forward them to the IOC. She also accepts a two-year competition ban, and agrees to forfeit all her results since September 1, 2000. (AP via ESPN.com)
- Cricket:
  - Australian cricket team in India in 2007–08
    - 4th ODI-India 291/4 (50 overs) beats Australia 283/7 (50 overs) by 8 runs in Chandigarh.
- National Football League:
  - Dallas Cowboys 25, Buffalo Bills 24
    - The Bills return two of Tony Romo's five interceptions for touchdowns and also score on a kickoff return. But after a Patrick Crayton touchdown reception, a missed two-point conversion and a successful onside kick, Nick Folk kicks a 53-yard field goal as time expires.
  - The Carolina Panthers announce starting quarterback Jake Delhomme will have season-ending surgery on his elbow. (AP via Yahoo)
  - Seattle Seahawks fullback Mack Strong, who has a spinal cord injury, announces his retirement. (AP via Yahoo)
- Baseball: 2007 MLB Postseason:
  - 2007 American League Division Series:
    - Cleveland Indians 6, New York Yankees 4 Cleveland wins series, 3–1.
      - Paul Byrd gets the win, giving up 2 runs in 5 innings. The Yankees hit three home runs, but all of them are solo shots. The Indians advance to face the Boston Red Sox in the 2007 American League Championship Series.

== 7 October 2007 (Sunday) ==
- Auto racing:
  - Formula One: Chinese Grand Prix at Shanghai, China:
  (1) Kimi Räikkönen (Finland) (2) Fernando Alonso (Spain) (3) Felipe Massa (Brazil)
  - NASCAR: UAW-Ford 500 at Talladega, Alabama:
  (1) Jeff Gordon (2) Jimmie Johnson (3) Dave Blaney
  - V8 Supercar: Bathurst 1000 at Mount Panorama, Australia:
  (1) Craig Lowndes (Australia) & Jamie Whincup (Australia) (2) James Courtney (Australia) & David Besnard (Australia) (3) Steven Johnson (Australia) & Will Davison (Australia)
  - WRC: Rally Catalunya at Catalunya, Spain:
  (1) Sébastien Loeb (France) (2) Daniel Sordo (Spain) (3) Marcus Grönholm (Finland)
- National Football League Week 5
  - Tennessee Titans 20, Atlanta Falcons 13
    - The Titans defense returns a Joey Harrington interception for a touchdown, then holds the Falcons on a goal-line stand late in the fourth quarter.
  - Jacksonville Jaguars 17, Kansas City Chiefs 7
    - The Chiefs gain only 10 yards on the ground and score their only points on the last play of the game.
  - Arizona Cardinals 34, St. Louis Rams 31
    - Former Ram Kurt Warner throws for 190 yards and a touchdown and runs for another after starting Cardinals quarterback Matt Leinart leaves with a broken collarbone
  - New England Patriots 34, Cleveland Browns 17
    - Cleveland quarterback Derek Anderson's three first-half interceptions help the Pats to a 20–0 halftime lead they don't abandon.
  - Carolina Panthers 16, New Orleans Saints 13
    - David Carr overcomes injury to lead a comeback win that ends in a John Kasay 52-yard field goal as time expires.
  - New York Giants 35, New York Jets 24
    - The Giants go ahead when Plaxico Burress turns a short pass into a 53-yard touchdown, then stem the Jets' comeback attempt when Aaron Ross returns a Chad Pennington interception for a score.
  - Pittsburgh Steelers 21, Seattle Seahawks 0
    - The Steelers hold the ball for nearly 25 minutes of the second half thanks to the running of Willie Parker and Najeh Davenport
  - Washington Redskins 34, Detroit Lions 3
    - Jason Campbell has a solid game for the Redskins, but his Detroit counterpart, Jon Kitna, is made miserable by Washington's pass rush.
  - Houston Texans 22, Miami Dolphins 19
    - Kris Brown ties a league record with three field goals of more than 50 yards, including the 57-yard game-winner.
  - Indianapolis Colts 33, Tampa Bay Buccaneers 14
    - Backup Indianapolis running back Kenton Keith runs for 121 yards and two touchdowns.
  - San Diego Chargers 41, Denver Broncos 3
    - San Diego bowls over their hosts with big games from running backs Michael Turner and LaDainian Tomlinson.
  - Baltimore Ravens at San Francisco 49ers
    - Three Matt Stover field goals provide the winning margin in a defensive battle.
  - Chicago Bears 27, Green Bay Packers 20
- Baseball: 2007 MLB Postseason:
  - 2007 American League Division Series:
    - Boston Red Sox 9, Los Angeles Angels of Anaheim 1: Curt Schilling throws seven shutout innings and David Ortiz and Manny Ramírez contribute back-to-back home runs. Boston wins series 3–0.
    - New York Yankees 8, Cleveland Indians 4. Cleveland leads series 2–1
- Basketball:
  - UAAP men's basketball Finals at Quezon City, Philippines.
    - La Salle 73–64 East, La Salle wins series, 2–0
      - After a 14–0 UE sweep of the elimination round, comebacking La Salle (which was suspended last year) sweeps the finals series in a big upset to win their seventh UAAP championship and extend UE's championship drought to 22 years.
- Rugby union: 2007 Rugby World Cup Quarter-finals:
  - QF3: South Africa 37–20 Fiji at Marseille
  - QF4: Argentina 19–13 Scotland at Paris – Saint Denis
    - Argentina make the semifinals of the World Cup for the first time ever, meeting the Springboks next weekend.
- Cricket
  - English cricket team in Sri Lanka in 2007–08
    - 3rd ODI-England 164/8 (46.5/48 ov.) beat Sri Lanka 164 (41.1/48 ov.) by 2 wickets (D/L)

== 6 October 2007 (Saturday) ==
- American football
  - NCAA Division I FBS AP Top 25:
    - (1) LSU 28, (9) Florida 24
      - An 8-minute, 11-second Tigers drive that features two fourth-down conversions ends with the game-winning touchdown by Jacob Hester.
    - Stanford 24, (2) USC 23
      - In an upset considered by some to surpass Appalachian State's upset of Michigan earlier this season, a TD pass with 54 seconds left from Tavita Pritchard to Mark Bradford and the ensuing point-after give Stanford the lead, and the defense holds on to hand the Trojans their first home loss since 2001.
    - (4) Ohio State 23, (23) Purdue 7
    - Illinois 31, (5) Wisconsin 26
      - Behind 160 yards and two TDs on the ground from Rashard Mendenhall, the Illini go to 3–0 in the Big Ten for the first time since 1990, and end the Badgers' Division I-leading winning streak at 14.
    - (6) South Florida 35, Florida Atlantic 23
    - (7) Boston College 55, Bowling Green 24
    - (10) Oklahoma 28, (19) Texas 21 (Red River Shootout)
      - Sooners quarterback Sam Bradford's three touchdowns lead Oklahoma to the win.
    - Tennessee 35, (12) Georgia 14
    - (13) West Virginia 55, Syracuse 14
    - (15) Virginia Tech 41, (22) Clemson 23
    - (16) Hawaiʻi 52, Utah State 37
    - (17) Missouri 41, (25) Nebraska 6
    - (18) Arizona State 23, Washington State 20
    - (20) Cincinnati 28, (21) Rutgers 23
    - Kansas 30, (24) Kansas State 24
  - Other significant games:
    - Notre Dame 20, UCLA 6 — The Irish, who entered the game at 0–5 for the first time in school history, surprise UCLA on the road.
- Baseball: 2007 MLB Postseason
  - 2007 National League Division Series
    - Arizona Diamondbacks 5, Chicago Cubs 1. Diamondbacks win series 3–0.
    - Colorado Rockies 2, Philadelphia Phillies 1. Rockies win series 3–0.
      - The Rockies win their first post season series in franchise history.
- Boxing: Bouts at Mandalay Bay Resort and Casino, Las Vegas, Nevada
  - (Philippines) Manny Pacquiao def. (Mexico) Marco Antonio Barrera via unanimous decision to retain the WBC international super featherweight title.
  - (United States) Vicente Escobedo def. (Mexico) Miguel Angel Munguia via unanimous decision in a junior lightweight bout.
  - (Mexico) Librado Andrade def. (United States) Yusaf Mack via technical knockout on a super middleweight bout.
  - (United States) Stephen Forbes def. (Mexico) Francisco Bojado via split decision in a junior welterweight bout.
- Rugby union: 2007 Rugby World Cup Quarter-finals:
  - QF1: Australia 10–12 England at Marseille
  - QF2: New Zealand 18–20 France at Cardiff
    - In an astonishing pair of results, two of the three Southern Hemisphere powerhouses of rugby are surprisingly eliminated from the competition, setting up an England-France semifinal next weekend. This is the first time that New Zealand have ever failed to reach the semifinals of the Rugby World Cup.

== 5 October 2007 (Friday) ==
- Ice hockey:
  - National Hockey League season openers:
    - Columbus Blue Jackets 4, Anaheim Ducks 0
    - Carolina Hurricanes 4, Pittsburgh Penguins 1
    - New York Islanders 6, Buffalo Sabres 4
    - Washington Capitals 3, Atlanta Thrashers 1
    - Dallas Stars 4, Boston Bruins 1
    - San Jose Sharks 3, Vancouver Canucks 1
- Baseball: 2007 MLB Postseason
  - 2007 American League Division Series
    - Cleveland Indians 2, New York Yankees 1 (11 innings) Indians lead series, 2–0
      - Travis Hafner drives in Kenny Lofton with a single off Luis Vizcaíno to cap off a pitcher's duel between Andy Pettitte and Fausto Carmona. Carmona allowed three hits over nine innings, one of those hits being a solo homer from Melky Cabrera.
    - Boston Red Sox 6, Los Angeles Angels 3. Red Sox lead series 2–0
      - Manny Ramírez hits a three-run walk-off homer to put the Red Sox on the verge of advancing to the ALCS.
- Rugby league: Super League Final Eliminator
  - Leeds Rhinos 36–6 Wigan Warriors at Headingley
- Cricket:
  - South African cricket team in Pakistan in 2007–08
    - South Africa 450 & 264/7 (dec) beat Pakistan 291 & 263 by 160 runs
  - Australian cricket team in India in 2007–08
    - Australia 290/7 (50 ov.) beat India 243 (47.4 ov.) by 47 runs

== 4 October 2007 (Thursday) ==
- Athletics: Track star Marion Jones of United States/Belize has acknowledged using the anabolic steroid THG as she prepared for the 2000 Summer Olympics in Sydney, where she won five medals, three gold and two bronze. Having previously sternly denied the use of any performance-enhancing drugs, Jones might now lose her Sydney medals. (Washington Post)
- American football:
  - NCAA Division I FBS AP Top 25:
    - (11) South Carolina 38, (8) Kentucky 23
- Basketball:
  - UAAP men's basketball Finals at Quezon City, Philippines.
    - La Salle 64–63 East, La Salle leads series, 1–0
      - La Salle deals UE their first loss of the season as they lead 1–0 in the best-of-3 finals.
- Ice hockey:
  - National Hockey League season openers:
    - New York Rangers 5, Florida Panthers 2
    - Tampa Bay Lightning 3, New Jersey Devils 1
    - Nashville Predators 4, Colorado Avalanche 0
    - Minnesota Wild 1, Chicago Blackhawks 0
    - Philadelphia Flyers 3, Calgary Flames 2
    - Edmonton Oilers 3, San Jose Sharks 2, SO
    - Phoenix Coyotes 3, St. Louis Blues 2,
- Baseball: 2007 MLB Postseason
  - 2007 American League Division Series
    - Cleveland Indians 12, New York Yankees 3 Indians lead series 1–0
      - Yankees starter Chien-Ming Wang gave up 8 earned runs on 9 hits in 4 2/3 innings, including home runs by Asdrúbal Cabrera and Víctor Martínez. Kenny Lofton went 3-for-4 for the Indians, driving in 4 runs.
  - 2007 National League Division Series
    - Colorado Rockies 10, Philadelphia Phillies 5 Rockies lead series, 2–0.
      - After taking a 3–2 lead in the 2nd, the Phillies are done in by a fourth-inning grand slam from Kaz Matsui. Matsui finishes a single short of hitting for the cycle.
    - Arizona Diamondbacks 8, Chicago Cubs 4, Diamondbacks lead series, 2–0
      - Chris Young hits a three-run homer and scores twice, and Justin Upton scores twice on a hit and two walks, powering the D-backs offense. Doug Davis strikes out eight in 5 2/3 innings of work.
  - Before their game, the players of the Colorado Rockies voted to give a full playoff share to the family of Tulsa Drillers first base coach Mike Coolbaugh, who died in July after being struck in the neck by a line drive foul ball.
- Cricket:
  - English cricket team in Sri Lanka in 2007–08
    - England 234/8 (50 ov.) beat Sri Lanka 169 (44.3 ov.) by 65 runs

== 3 October 2007 (Wednesday) ==
- Football (soccer):
  - 2007 Lamar Hunt U.S. Open Cup Final
    - New England Revolution 3 – 2 FC Dallas
- Ice hockey:
  - National Hockey League season openers:
    - Montreal Canadiens 3, Carolina Hurricanes 2 (OT)
    - Detroit Red Wings 3, Anaheim Ducks 2 (shootout)
    - Ottawa Senators 4, Toronto Maple Leafs 3 (OT)
    - Colorado Avalanche 4, Dallas Stars 3
- Baseball: 2007 MLB Postseason
  - 2007 American League Division Series
    - Boston Red Sox 4, Los Angeles Angels of Anaheim 0 Red Sox lead series, 1–0.
      - Home runs from David Ortiz and Kevin Youkilis pace the Sox, while Josh Beckett pitches the first playoff complete game shutout for Boston since Luis Tiant did it in 1975.
  - 2007 National League Division Series
    - Colorado Rockies 4, Philadelphia Phillies 2 Rockies lead series, 1–0.
      - A three-run second inning for Colorado puts Jeff Francis up early for seven strong innings on the mound. Aaron Rowand and Pat Burrell hit successive homers in a losing cause.
    - Arizona Diamondbacks 3, Chicago Cubs 1 D-backs lead series, 1–0.
      - Brandon Webb pitches seven innings with nine strikeouts and one run allowed, and Stephen Drew and Mark Reynolds provide run support via solo home runs to give the Snakes an early edge.
  - Non-playoff news:
    - Walt Jocketty is out as general manager of the St. Louis Cardinals "by mutual decision". Jocketty's departure leaves the future of Tony La Russa as Cardinals manager in question; Jocketty hired La Russa in 1996, and La Russa's contract is expiring. (AP via Yahoo!)

== 2 October 2007 (Tuesday) ==
- College football:
  - Memphis 24, Marshall 21.
    - Playing with heavy hearts following the murder of reserve defensive end Taylor Bradford, the Tigers win in this Conference USA matchup at home.
- Major League Baseball Awards
  - Carlos Peña of the Tampa Bay Devil Rays and Dmitri Young of the Washington Nationals are awarded the MLB Comeback Player of the Year Award for the American League and National League, respectively.
- Cricket
  - Australian cricket team in India in 2007–08
    - 2nd ODI:Australia 306/6 (50 ov.) beat India 222 (47.3 ov.) by 84 runs at Kochi in second of seven match series.
  - South African cricket team in Pakistan in 2007–08
    - 1st Test-2nd Day: South Africa 450 lead Pakistan 127/5 (40 ov.) by 323 runs

== 1 October 2007 (Monday) ==
- Major League Baseball Postseason
  - One-game playoff for the National League Wild Card: Colorado Rockies 9, San Diego Padres 8 (13 innings)
    - After a 2-run Scott Hairston home run in the top half of the 13th puts the Padres up 8–6, Matt Holliday ties the score with a triple and scores the winning run on a sacrifice fly to clinch the Rockies' second playoff appearance.
    - Since one-game playoff stats count toward regular season statistics, Matt Holliday clinches the National League RBI title (137). He had already clinched the batting average title (.340).
  - "Rally Monday" was held in the seven playoff cities, as well as San Diego and Denver, for fans to show their support to the teams entering the Division Series this week.
- American football
  - National Football League Week 4
    - New England Patriots 34, Cincinnati Bengals 13
- Cricket
  - English cricket team in Sri Lanka in 2007–08
    - 1st ODI:Sri Lanka 269/7 (50 ov.) beat England 150 (34.5 ov.) by 119 runs
