= Contepomi =

Contepomi is a surname. Notable people with the surname include:

- Felipe Contepomi (born 1977), Argentine rugby union coach and former player
- Manuel Contepomi (born 1977), Argentine retired rugby union player
- Bebe Contepomi (born 1970), Argentine journalist and TV host
