= 2007 Rugby World Cup knockout stage =

The knockout stage of the 2007 Rugby World Cup began on 6 October with a quarter-final between Australia and England and concluded on 20 October with the final, at the Stade de France in Saint-Denis, Paris, between England and South Africa, their second meeting in this tournament.

South Africa were the first team to qualify for the knockout stage, when they beat Tonga 30–25 in their penultimate Pool A game.

This was the first Rugby World Cup tournament to have its semi-finalists coming from only two pools (Pools A and D), and the finalists coming from just one pool (Pool A). The top two representative nations of each of pools B and C were eliminated in the quarter-finals.

== Summary ==
Quarter-finals
6 October – Marseille
Australia	10
England	12
6 October – Cardiff
New Zealand	18
France	20
7 October – Marseille
South Africa	37
Fiji	20
7 October – Saint-Denis
Argentina	19
Scotland	13

Semi-finals
13 October – Saint-Denis
England	14
France	9
14 October – Saint-Denis
South Africa	37
Argentina	13

Final
20 October – Saint-Denis
England	6
South Africa	15
Third place
19 October – Paris
France	10
Argentina	34

== Quarter-finals ==
=== Australia vs England ===
6 October 2007
15:00

Australia	10–12	England
Try: Tuqiri 33' c Con: Mortlock (1/1); Pen: Mortlock (1/4) 7'	Report	Pen: Wilkinson (4/7) 23', 26', 52', 60'

Stade Vélodrome, Marseille
Attendance: 59,102
Referee: Alain Rolland (Ireland)

FB	15	Chris Latham
RW	14	Adam Ashley-Cooper	(substituted off) 64'
OC	13	Stirling Mortlock (c)
IC	12	Matt Giteau
LW	11	Lote Tuqiri
FH	10	Berrick Barnes
SH	9	George Gregan
N8	8	Wycliff Palu	(substituted off) 76'
OF	7	George Smith	(substituted off) 64'
BF	6	Rocky Elsom			(substituted off) 64'
RL	5	Daniel Vickerman	28' to 30'
LL	4	Nathan Sharpe
TP	3	Guy Shepherdson	(substituted off) 64'
HK	2	Stephen Moore	(substituted off) 73'
LP	1	Matt Dunning
Replacements:
HK	16	Adam Freier	(substituted in) 73'
PR	17	Al Baxter	(substituted in) 64'
LK	18	Hugh McMeniman	(substituted in) 28'	(substituted off) 30'	(substituted in) 64'
N8	19	Stephen Hoiles	(substituted in) 76'
FL	20	Phil Waugh	(substituted in) 64'
FH	21	Julian Huxley
WG	22	Drew Mitchell	(substituted in) 64'
Coach:
(Australia) John Connolly

FB	15	Jason Robinson
RW	14	Paul Sackey
OC	13	Mathew Tait
IC	12	Mike Catt	(substituted off) 64'
LW	11	Josh Lewsey
FH	10	Jonny Wilkinson
SH	9	Andy Gomarsall	22' to 28'
N8	8	Nick Easter	(substituted off) 69'
OF	7	Lewis Moody	(substituted off) 66'
BF	6	Martin Corry
RL	5	Ben Kay
LL	4	Simon Shaw
TP	3	Phil Vickery (c)	(substituted off) 59'
HK	2	Mark Regan	(substituted off) 52'
LP	1	Andrew Sheridan
Replacements:
HK	16	George Chuter	(substituted in) 52'
PR	17	Matt Stevens	(substituted in) 59'
N8	18	Lawrence Dallaglio	(substituted in) 69'
FL	19	Joe Worsley	(substituted in) 66'
SH	20	Peter Richards	(substituted in) 22'	(substituted off) 28'
FH	21	Toby Flood	(substituted in) 64'
CE	22	Dan Hipkiss
Coach:
(England) Brian Ashton

Man of the Match:
Andrew Sheridan (England)

Touch judges:
Paul Honiss (New Zealand)
Nigel Owens (Wales)
Television match official:
Marius Jonker (South Africa)
Fourth official:
Steve Walsh (New Zealand)
Fifth official:
Alan Lewis (Ireland)

Notes

- This was England's third consecutive World Cup win against Australia, following victories in the 1995 quarter-final and 2003 Final, and gave them a 3-2 head-to-head winning World Cup record against the Wallabies. Furthermore, England remained the only team to record a Rugby World Cup win over the Wallabies since South Africa beat them in the opening match of the 1995 World Cup.
- Jonny Wilkinson's 12 points in this game took him past Gavin Hastings' record of 227 World Cup points.

=== New Zealand vs France ===
6 October 2007
21:00

New Zealand	18–20	France
Try: McAlister 17' c So'oialo 63' m Con: Carter (1/1); Pen: Carter (2/2) 14', 31'	Report	Try: Dusautoir 54' c Jauzion 69' c Con: Beauxis (1/1); Élissalde (1/1); Pen: Beauxis (2/3) 40+', 46'

Millennium Stadium, Cardiff
Attendance: 71,669
Referee: Wayne Barnes (England)

FB	15	Leon MacDonald
RW	14	Joe Rokocoko
OC	13	Mils Muliaina
IC	12	Luke McAlister	(yellow card) 46'
LW	11	Sitiveni Sivivatu
FH	10	Dan Carter		(substituted off) 56'
SH	9	Byron Kelleher		(substituted off) 56'
N8	8	Rodney So'oialo
OF	7	Richie McCaw (c)
BF	6	Jerry Collins		(substituted off) 64'
RL	5	Ali Williams
LL	4	Keith Robinson		(substituted off) 42'
TP	3	Carl Hayman
HK	2	Anton Oliver		(substituted off) 56'
LP	1	Tony Woodcock
Replacements:
HK	16	Andrew Hore		(substituted in) 56'
PR	17	Neemia Tialata
LK	18	Chris Jack		(substituted in) 42'
FL	19	Chris Masoe		(substituted in) 64'
SH	20	Brendon Leonard		(substituted in) 56'
FH	21	Nick Evans		(substituted in) 56'	(substituted off) 71'
CE	22	Isaia Toeava			(substituted in) 71'
Coach:
(New Zealand) Graham Henry

FB	15	Damien Traille
RW	14	Vincent Clerc
OC	13	David Marty
IC	12	Yannick Jauzion
LW	11	Cédric Heymans	(substituted off) 69'
FH	10	Lionel Beauxis	(substituted off) 68'
SH	9	Jean-Baptiste Élissalde
N8	8	Julien Bonnaire
OF	7	Thierry Dusautoir
BF	6	Serge Betsen	(substituted off) 5'
RL	5	Jérôme Thion
LL	4	Fabien Pelous	(substituted off) 52'
TP	3	Pieter de Villiers
HK	2	Raphaël Ibañez (c)	(substituted off) 52'
LP	1	Olivier Milloud	(substituted off) 41'
Replacements:
HK	16	Dimitri Szarzewski	(substituted in) 52'
PR	17	Jean-Baptiste Poux	(substituted in) 41'
LK	18	Sébastien Chabal	(substituted in) 52'
N8	19	Imanol Harinordoquy	(substituted in) 5'
FH	20	Frédéric Michalak	(substituted in) 68'
WG	21	Christophe Dominici	(substituted in) 69'
FB	22	Clément Poitrenaud
Coach:
(France) Bernard Laporte

Man of the Match:
Luke McAlister (New Zealand)

Touch judges:
Tony Spreadbury (England)
Jonathan Kaplan (South Africa)
Television match official:
Chris White (England)
Fourth official:
Stuart Dickinson (Australia)
Fifth official:
Tim Hayes (Wales)

Notes

- This was New Zealand's worst World Cup finish; they had never before failed to reach the semi-finals.

=== South Africa vs Fiji ===
7 October 2007
15:00

South Africa	37–20	Fiji
Try: Fourie 13' m Smit 35' m Pietersen 51' c Smith 70' c James 80' c Con: Montgomery (3/5); Pen: Steyn (1/1) 8'; Montgomery (1/2) 63'	Report	Try: Delasau 57' c Bobo 59' c Con: Bai (2/2); Pen: Bai (2/2) 26', 44'

Stade Vélodrome, Marseille
Attendance: 55,943
Referee: Alan Lewis (Ireland)

FB	15	Percy Montgomery
RW	14	JP Pietersen
OC	13	Jaque Fourie
IC	12	François Steyn
LW	11	Bryan Habana
FH	10	Butch James
SH	9	Fourie du Preez
N8	8	Danie Rossouw	(substituted off) 50'
BF	7	Juan Smith
OF	6	Schalk Burger
RL	5	Victor Matfield
LL	4	Bakkies Botha	53' to 58'		(substituted off) 75'
TP	3	Jannie du Plessis
HK	2	John Smit (c)
LP	1	Os du Randt	(substituted off) 53'
Replacements:
HK	16	Gary Botha
PR	17	Gurthro Steenkamp	(substituted in) 53'
LK	18	Johannes Muller	(substituted in) 53'	(substituted off) 58'	(substituted in) 75'
FL	19	Wikus van Heerden	(substituted in) 50'
SH	20	Ruan Pienaar
FH	21	André Pretorius
CE	22	Wynand Olivier
Coach:
(South Africa) Jake White

FB	15	Norman Ligairi
RW	14	Vilimoni Delasau
OC	13	Kameli Ratuvou		(substituted off) 64'
IC	12	Seru Rabeni	(yellow card) 51'
LW	11	Sereli Bobo
FH	10	Seremaia Bai
SH	9	Mosese Rauluni (c)
N8	8	Sisa Koyamaibole
OF	7	Akapusi Qera		(substituted off) 71'
BF	6	Semisi Naevo
RL	5	Ifereimi Rawaqa
LL	4	Kele Leawere		(substituted off) 73'
TP	3	Henry Qiodravu		(substituted off) 55'
HK	2	Sunia Koto		(substituted off) 71'
LP	1	Graham Dewes
Replacements:
HK	16	Bill Gadolo		(substituted in) 71'
PR	17	Jone Railomo		(substituted in) 55'
CE	18	Aca Ratuva		(substituted in) 71'
LK	19	Wame Lewaravu		(substituted in) 73'
SH	20	Jone Daunivucu
FH	21	Waisea Luveniyali
CE	22	Gabiriele Lovobalavu		(substituted in) 64'
Coach:
(Fiji) Ilie Tabua

Man of the Match:
Juan Smith (South Africa)

Touch judges:
Steve Walsh (New Zealand)
Paul Honiss (New Zealand)
Television match official:
Nigel Owens (Wales)
Fourth official:
Marius Jonker (South Africa)
Fifth official:
Alain Rolland (Ireland)

Notes

- This was Fiji's first quarter-final appearance since the inaugural competition in 1987.

=== Argentina vs Scotland ===
7 October 2007
21:00

Argentina	19–13	Scotland
Try: Longo Elía 33' c Con: F. Contepomi (1/1); Pen: F. Contepomi (3/4) 23', 29', 43'; Drop: Hernández (1/4) 54'	Report	Try: Cusiter 63' c Con: Paterson (1/1); Pen: Parks (1/2) 16'; Paterson (1/1) 38'

Stade de France, Saint-Denis
Attendance: 76,866
Referee: Joël Jutge (France)

FB	15	Ignacio Corleto
RW	14	Lucas Borges
OC	13	Manuel Contepomi	(substituted off) 67'
IC	12	Felipe Contepomi
LW	11	Horacio Agulla
FH	10	Juan Martín Hernández
SH	9	Agustín Pichot (c)
N8	8	Gonzalo Longo
OF	7	Juan Martín Fernández Lobbe
BF	6	Lucas Ostiglia	(substituted off) 55'
RL	5	Patricio Albacete
LL	4	Ignacio Fernández Lobbe	(substituted off) 51'
TP	3	Martín Scelzo	(substituted off) 57'
HK	2	Mario Ledesma
LP	1	Rodrigo Roncero
Replacements:
HK	16	Alberto Vernet Basualdo
PR	17	Omar Hasan	(substituted in) 57'
LK	18	Rimas Álvarez Kairelis	(substituted in) 51'
FL	19	Juan Manuel Leguizamón	(substituted in) 55'
SH	20	Nicolás Fernández Miranda
FH	21	Federico Todeschini
CE	22	Hernán Senillosa	(substituted in) 67'
Coach:
(Argentina) Marcelo Loffreda

FB	15	Rory Lamont	(substituted off) 68'
RW	14	Sean Lamont
OC	13	Simon Webster
IC	12	Rob Dewey	(substituted off) 41'
LW	11	Chris Paterson
FH	10	Dan Parks
SH	9	Mike Blair	(substituted off) 57'
N8	8	Simon Taylor
OF	7	Ally Hogg	(substituted off) 57'
BF	6	Jason White (c)
RL	5	Jim Hamilton	(substituted off) 57'
LL	4	Nathan Hines
TP	3	Euan Murray
HK	2	Ross Ford	(substituted off) 68'
LP	1	Gavin Kerr	(substituted off) 57'
Replacements:
HK	16	Scott Lawson	(substituted in) 68'
PR	17	Craig Smith	(substituted in) 57'
LK	18	Scott MacLeod	(substituted in) 57'
FL	19	Kelly Brown	(substituted in) 57'
SH	20	Chris Cusiter	(substituted in) 57'
CE	21	Andrew Henderson	(substituted in) 41'
FB	22	Hugo Southwell	(substituted in) 68'
Coach:
(Scotland) Frank Hadden

Man of the Match:
Gonzalo Longo Elía (Argentina)

Touch judges:
Chris White (England)
Stuart Dickinson (Australia)
Television match official:
Jonathan Kaplan (South Africa)
Fourth official:
Tony Spreadbury (England)
Fifth official:
Wayne Barnes (England)

Notes

- Argentina's win took them into their first ever World Cup semi-final. Scotland had been seeking to reach their second semi-final, after a fourth-place finish in 1991.

== Semi-finals ==
=== England vs France ===
13 October 2007
21:00

England	14–9	France
Try: Lewsey 2' m Pen: Wilkinson (2/3) 47', 75'; Drop: Wilkinson (1/4) 78'	Report	Pen: Beauxis (3/3) 8', 18', 44'

Stade de France, Saint-Denis
Attendance: 80,283
Referee: Jonathan Kaplan (South Africa)

FB	15	Jason Robinson
RW	14	Paul Sackey
OC	13	Mathew Tait
IC	12	Mike Catt	(substituted off) 69'
LW	11	Josh Lewsey	(substituted off) 40'
FH	10	Jonny Wilkinson
SH	9	Andy Gomarsall	(substituted off) 71'
N8	8	Nick Easter	(substituted off) 69'
OF	7	Lewis Moody	(substituted off) 54'
BF	6	Martin Corry
RL	5	Ben Kay
LL	4	Simon Shaw
TP	3	Phil Vickery (c)	(substituted off) 56'
HK	2	Mark Regan	(substituted off) 66'
LP	1	Andrew Sheridan
Replacements:
HK	16	George Chuter	(substituted in) 66'
PR	17	Matt Stevens	(substituted in) 56'
N8	18	Lawrence Dallaglio	(substituted in) 69'
FL	19	Joe Worsley	(substituted in) 54'
SH	20	Peter Richards	(substituted in) 71'
FH	21	Toby Flood	(substituted in) 69'
CE	22	Dan Hipkiss	(substituted in) 40'
Coach:
(England) Brian Ashton

FB	15	Damien Traille
RW	14	Vincent Clerc
OC	13	David Marty
IC	12	Yannick Jauzion
LW	11	Cédric Heymans	(substituted off) 61'
FH	10	Lionel Beauxis	(substituted off) 51'
SH	9	Jean-Baptiste Élissalde
N8	8	Julien Bonnaire
OF	7	Thierry Dusautoir
BF	6	Serge Betsen	(substituted off) 67'
RL	5	Jérôme Thion
LL	4	Fabien Pelous	(substituted off) 25'
TP	3	Pieter de Villiers	(substituted off) 66'
HK	2	Raphaël Ibañez (c)	(substituted off) 51'
LP	1	Olivier Milloud
Replacements:
HK	16	Dimitri Szarzewski	(substituted in) 51'
PR	17	Jean-Baptiste Poux	(substituted in) 66'
LK	18	Sébastien Chabal	(substituted in) 25'
N8	19	Imanol Harinordoquy	(substituted in) 67'
FH	20	Frédéric Michalak	(substituted in) 51'
WG	21	Christophe Dominici	(substituted in) 61'
FB	22	Clément Poitrenaud
Coach:
(France) Bernard Laporte

Man of the Match:
Mike Catt (England)

Touch judges:
Paul Honiss (New Zealand)
Marius Jonker (South Africa)
Television match official:
Stuart Dickinson (Australia)
Fourth official:
Nigel Owens (Wales)
Fifth official:
Alain Rolland (Ireland)

Notes

- Josh Lewsey's try, scored after 79 seconds, was the fastest in any match in the knockout stage of a Rugby World Cup and is thought to be the fastest try in England's history.
- Jonny Wilkinson extended his World Cup points record to 243.

=== South Africa vs Argentina ===
14 October 2007
21:00

South Africa	37–13	Argentina
Try: Du Preez 7' c Habana (2) 32' c, 76' c Rossouw 40' c Con: Montgomery (4/4); Pen: Montgomery (3/3) 17', 71', 75'	Report	Try: M. Contepomi 45' c Con: F. Contepomi (1/1); Pen: F. Contepomi (2/4) 15', 30'

Stade de France, Saint-Denis
Attendance: 77,055
Referee: Steve Walsh (New Zealand)

FB	15	Percy Montgomery
RW	14	JP Pietersen		(substituted off) 76'
OC	13	Jaque Fourie
IC	12	François Steyn		(substituted off) 76'
LW	11	Bryan Habana
FH	10	Butch James		(substituted off) 76'
SH	9	Fourie du Preez
N8	8	Danie Rossouw		(substituted off) 75'
BF	7	Juan Smith	(yellow card) 78'
OF	6	Schalk Burger
RL	5	Victor Matfield
LL	4	Bakkies Botha		21' to 29'		(substituted off) 76'
TP	3	CJ van der Linde
HK	2	John Smit (c)		(substituted off) 76'
LP	1	Os du Randt		44' to 49'		(substituted off) 72'
Replacements:
HK	16	Bismarck du Plessis		(substituted in) 76'
PR	17	Jannie du Plessis		(substituted in) 44'	(substituted off) 49'	(substituted in) 72'
LK	18	Johannes Muller		(substituted in) 21'	(substituted off) 29'	(substituted in) 76'
N8	19	Bobby Skinstad		(substituted in) 75'
SH	20	Ruan Pienaar		(substituted in) 76'
FH	21	André Pretorius		(substituted in) 76'
CE	22	Wynand Olivier		(substituted in) 76'
Coach:
(South Africa) Jake White

FB	15	Ignacio Corleto
RW	14	Lucas Borges
OC	13	Manuel Contepomi		(substituted off) 65'
IC	12	Felipe Contepomi	(yellow card) 79'
LW	11	Horacio Agulla
FH	10	Juan Martín Hernández
SH	9	Agustín Pichot (c)
N8	8	Gonzalo Longo
OF	7	Juan Martín Fernández Lobbe
BF	6	Lucas Ostiglia		(substituted off) 65'
RL	5	Patricio Albacete
LL	4	Ignacio Fernández Lobbe		(substituted off) 53'
TP	3	Martín Scelzo		(substituted off) 34'
HK	2	Mario Ledesma
LP	1	Rodrigo Roncero
Replacements:
HK	16	Alberto Vernet Basualdo
PR	17	Omar Hasan		(substituted in) 34'
LK	18	Rimas Álvarez Kairelis		(substituted in) 53'
FL	19	Juan Manuel Leguizamón		(substituted in) 65'
SH	20	Nicolás Fernández Miranda
FH	21	Federico Todeschini
CE	22	Gonzalo Tiesi		(substituted in) 65'
Coach:
(Argentina) Marcelo Loffreda

Man of the Match:
Danie Rossouw (South Africa)

Touch judges:
Alan Lewis (Ireland)
Chris White (England)
Television match official:
Tony Spreadbury (England)
Fourth official:
Joël Jutge (France)
Fifth official:
Wayne Barnes (England)

Notes

- With his second try in this match, Bryan Habana equalled Jonah Lomu's single-tournament record of eight tries.

== Bronze final: France vs Argentina ==
19 October 2007
21:00

France	10–34	Argentina
Try: Poitrenaud 69' c Con: Beauxis (1/1); Pen: Élissalde (1/1) 18'	Report	Try: F. Contepomi (2) 28' c, 77' c Hasan 32' c Martín Aramburú 53' m Corleto 65' m Con: F. Contepomi (3/5); Pen: F. Contepomi (1/1) 21'

Parc des Princes, Paris
Attendance: 45,958
Referee: Paul Honiss (New Zealand)

FB	15	Clément Poitrenaud
RW	14	Aurélien Rougerie		(substituted off) 62'
OC	12	David Marty		(substituted off) 70'
IC	13	David Skrela
LW	11	Christophe Dominici
FH	10	Frédéric Michalak
SH	9	Jean-Baptiste Élissalde		(substituted off) 55'
N8	8	Imanol Harinordoquy
OF	7	Thierry Dusautoir		(substituted off) 42'
BF	6	Yannick Nyanga
RL	5	Jérôme Thion		(substituted off) 62'
LL	4	Lionel Nallet
TP	3	Nicolas Mas
HK	2	Raphaël Ibañez (c)	(yellow card) 40+'	(substituted off) 50'
LP	1	Jean-Baptiste Poux
Replacements:
HK	16	Sébastien Bruno		(substituted in) 42'
PR	17	Pieter de Villiers
LK	18	Sébastien Chabal		(substituted in) 62'
FL	19	Rémy Martin		(substituted in) 50'
SH	20	Pierre Mignoni		(substituted in) 55'
FH	21	Lionel Beauxis		(substituted in) 70'
WG	22	Vincent Clerc		(substituted in) 62'
Coach:
(France) Bernard Laporte

FB	15	Ignacio Corleto		(substituted off) 74'
RW	14	Federico Martín Aramburú
OC	13	Manuel Contepomi		(substituted off) 62'
IC	12	Felipe Contepomi		70' to 77'
LW	11	Horacio Agulla
FH	10	Juan Martín Hernández
SH	9	Agustín Pichot (c)
N8	8	Gonzalo Longo
OF	7	Juan Martín Fernández Lobbe
BF	6	Martín Durand		(substituted off) 62'
RL	5	Patricio Albacete
LL	4	Rimas Álvarez Kairelis	(yellow card) 40+'	(substituted off) 71'
TP	3	Omar Hasan		(substituted off) 71'
HK	2	Alberto Vernet Basualdo
LP	1	Rodrigo Roncero		(substituted off) 79'
Replacements:
HK	16	Eusebio Guiñazu		(substituted in) 79'
PR	17	Marcos Ayerza		(substituted in) 71'
LK	18	Esteban Lozada		(substituted in) 71'
N8	19	Juan Manuel Leguizamón	(yellow card) 63'	(substituted in) 62'
SH	20	Nicolás Fernández Miranda		(substituted in) 70'	(substituted off) 77'
FH	21	Federico Todeschini		(substituted in) 74'
CE	22	Hernán Senillosa		(substituted in) 62'
Coach:
(Argentina) Marcelo Loffreda

Man of the Match:
Agustín Pichot (Argentina)

Touch judges:
Stuart Dickinson (Australia)
Nigel Owens (Wales)
Television match official:
Marius Jonker (South Africa)
Fourth official:
Wayne Barnes (England)
Fifth official:
Chris White (England)

External videos
- Rugby World Cup 2007: Third Place Playoff – France v Argentina on YouTube

Notes

- This was referee Paul Honiss's 45th test, breaking the record he had previously shared with Derek Bevan of Wales. This record would be surpassed by Jonathan Kaplan in 2008.
- French centre David Marty played outside centre despite wearing the #12, David Skrela played inside centre with the #13.
- This was the first occasion in Rugby World Cup history where two teams who had played each other in the pool stage met each other later on in the same tournament.

== Final: England vs South Africa ==
20 October 2007
21:00

England	6–15	South Africa
Pen: Wilkinson (2/2) 13', 44'	Report	Pen: Montgomery (4/4) 7', 16', 40', 51'; Steyn (1/2) 62'

Stade de France, Saint-Denis
Attendance: 80,430
Referee: Alain Rolland (Ireland)

FB	15	Jason Robinson	(substituted off) 47'
RW	14	Paul Sackey
OC	13	Mathew Tait
IC	12	Mike Catt	(substituted off) 51'
LW	11	Mark Cueto
FH	10	Jonny Wilkinson
SH	9	Andy Gomarsall
N8	8	Nick Easter	(substituted off) 65'
OF	7	Lewis Moody	(substituted off) 63'
BF	6	Martin Corry
RL	5	Ben Kay
LL	4	Simon Shaw
TP	3	Phil Vickery (c)	(substituted off) 41'
HK	2	Mark Regan	(substituted off) 63'
LP	1	Andrew Sheridan
Replacements:
HK	16	George Chuter	(substituted in) 63'
PR	17	Matt Stevens	(substituted in) 41'
N8	18	Lawrence Dallaglio	(substituted in) 65'
FL	19	Joe Worsley	(substituted in) 63'	(substituted off) 71'
SH	20	Peter Richards		(substituted in) 71'
FH	21	Toby Flood	(substituted in) 51'
CE	22	Dan Hipkiss	(substituted in) 47'
Coach:
(England) Brian Ashton

FB	15	Percy Montgomery
RW	14	JP Pietersen
OC	13	Jaque Fourie
IC	12	François Steyn
LW	11	Bryan Habana
FH	10	Butch James
SH	9	Fourie du Preez
N8	8	Danie Rossouw	(substituted off) 72'
BF	7	Juan Smith
OF	6	Schalk Burger
RL	5	Victor Matfield
LL	4	Bakkies Botha
TP	3	CJ van der Linde
HK	2	John Smit (c)	72' to 77'
LP	1	Os du Randt
Replacements:
HK	16	Bismarck du Plessis	(substituted in) 72'	(substituted off) 77'
PR	17	Jannie du Plessis
LK	18	Johannes Muller
FL	19	Wikus van Heerden	(substituted in) 72'
SH	20	Ruan Pienaar
FH	21	André Pretorius
CE	22	Wynand Olivier
Coach:
(South Africa) Jake White

Man of the Match:
Victor Matfield (South Africa)

Touch judges:
Joël Jutge (France)
Paul Honiss (New Zealand)
Television match official:
Stuart Dickinson (Australia)
Fourth official:
Alan Lewis (Ireland)
Fifth official:
Steve Walsh (New Zealand)

Notes

- Jonny Wilkinson's six points in this game made him the leading points scorer in World Cups with 249 points.
- Percy Montgomery finished as the tournament's leading points scorer, with 105 points.
- This was the second occasion in Rugby World Cup history where two teams who had played each other in the pool stage met each other later on in the same tournament, and the first time it had happened in the final.
