= Manuel D'Ornellas =

Peruvian lawyer and journalist

Manuel D'Ornellas (1937–1999) was a Peruvian lawyer and distinguished journalist. He was known as "Manu", was born in San Sebastian, Spain, the son of Peruvian and Spanish parents on April 29, 1937. However, he always held Peruvian nationality, but not Spanish, as his father enrolled him at birth at the Peruvian Consulate. He died in Montevideo in 1999.

D'Ornellas was born in San Sebastian, Spain, to Baron Manuel d'Ornellas y Pardo and Pilar Suárez de Salazar. D'Ornellas lived in Buenos Aires, where he was educated at Colegio Santa Maria, Colegio Cardenal Newman and the University of Buenos Aires.

In 1960, he married Princess Monika Radziwiłł Czartoryska, granddaughter of the Polish princes Franciszek Pius Radziwiłł and Adam Ludwik Czartoryski.

He was Commercial Attaché at the Peruvian Embassy in Buenos Aires between 1960 and 1962.
