= Colegio Cardenal Newman =

Cardinal Newman College
- Colegio Cardenal Newman

Location
- Boulogne Sur Mer, San Isidro Partido; Argentina
- Coordinates: 34.4865°S 58.5622°W

Information
- Type: Private secondary school
- Motto: Certa Bonum Certamen (Fight the Good Fight)
- Religious affiliation: Roman Catholic (Congregation of Christian Brothers)
- Established: 29 March 1948; 78 years ago
- Administrator: Marcelo Trohavcic
- Director: Alberto Olivero
- Head teacher: Liliana Facciola
- Gender: Coeducational
- Language: Spanish, English
- Website: cardenal-newman.edu

Colegio Cardenal Newman or Cardinal Newman College is Catholic, bilingual, day, co-educational primary and secondary school in Boulogne Sur Mer, San Isidro Partido, Buenos Aires Province, Argentina, in Greater Buenos Aires.

== Values ==
All its students are expected to complete seven IGCSE exams (Cambridge University) in year 10 and receive an International Baccalaureate diploma in their last year at school. The college is located in the area of San Isidro. It was founded by the Irish Christian Brothers who still provide staff. The motto of the college is "Fight the Good Fight" (in Latin: Certa Bonum Certamen) which is taken from St. Paul's first letter to Timothy in which Paul writes "fight the good fight of faith to win for yourself eternal life" (Timothy 6:12)." The Christian Brothers seek to educate men with the vision of his founder, Edmund Ignatius Rice (1762–1844). "Honesty, loyalty, solidarity, and deep moral values; give them the strength to fight for good causes, with honor and moral integrity". The college is an important centre for Rugby union in Argentina and Club Newman has close connections with it.

According to the newspaper Perfil, the college's bilingual and Catholic education, as well as its high tuition and monthly fees, has made it an elite school since its foundation and it remained as of 2015 one of the most expensive private schools in Argentina.

== Origins ==
The college was founded in 1948 as the result of many years' effort by the Irish immigrant community in Argentina to obtain a pastoral and education ministry from the Irish Catholic Church. The Passionists had arrived in the mid-19th century and one of their priests, Father Fahy, who had established a boys’ school in 1860, suggested then that the Christian Brothers should take it over. However, this request was refused by the order because they were concentrating their efforts in the United States and, later, in Australia and New Zealand, where much greater numbers of Irish people had migrated. In 1946, Father Dominic Moore, provincial of the Passionist Order, visited the Superior of the Christian Brothers in Dublin, and once again promoted a new foundation in Argentina. His request was accepted, and in November 1947, Brothers Joseph Ignatius Doorley (founder of various schools in USA) and Cornelius O’Reilly arrived in Buenos Aires. Father Moore found a suitable building in Belgrano 1548 and the new school was named after Cardinal Newman. Colegio Cardenal Newman was opened on the Belgrano site on 29 March 1948. The national education programme in Spanish was followed during the morning, allowing the afternoons to be devoted to English. Brother Alphonsus L. Pakenham was the first Rector. He presided over a community of 7 brothers, 8 lay teachers, and 148 students, 27 of whom were boarders. In 1949 the roll increased to 200 boys and there "would have been more had there been more vacancies". The Christian Brothers encouraged the playing of Rugby Union and so began a great tradition at the college which led also to the founding of Club Newman in 1975.

== Development ==
In 1971 the college changed its location to San Isidro. The ample campus included large classrooms, spaces for extracurricular activities and sports. The school continues to promote rugby union and to value its connection with Club Newman. The membership of that club consists mostly of alumni of the school and their families. Although traditionally a boys' school, the college decided in 2021 to become co-educational over time.

There have been complaints by former pupils of significant sexual abuse at the college.

== Rectors ==
- Brother Alphonsus L. Pakenham, (1948)
- Br. Hayes
- Br. John Burke
- Br. O'Brien
- Br. Gallagher
- Br. Derham
- Br. Finnegan
- Br. Keohane
- Sr. Alberto Olivero

== Notable alumni ==
=== Academic ===
- Carlos Rodríguez Braun, professor of History of Economic Thought at the Universidad Complutense, Madrid

=== Art and Music ===
- Eugenio Cesar Aleman, (born in 1953 in Buenos Aires), also known as Chapete; drummer of the pop group Los Helicópteros. He is also an architect
- Guillermo Carlos Cazenave, (born September 18, 1955 in Buenos Aires) musician and writer resident in Europe for more than four decades; also a journalist, specialized in many different musical styles
- Donald Clifton McCluskey, (born July 9, 1946 in Buenos Aires), popularly known as Donald. Pop and ballad singer, who achieved fame in the 1960s and 1970s. He is also a lawyer
- Francisco Prati, (born in 1953 in Buenos Aires), first drummer of the famous folk-pop group Sui Generis. He is also an architect
- Federico Peralta Ramos (29 January 1939 - 30 August 1992), Mar del Plata, Argentina, artist, representative of dadaism and of the avant-garde of the sixties.
- Juan Forn, writer.

=== Business ===
- Carlos Miguens Bemberg (born 1949), Argentine businessman (mainly brewing and mining)
- Nicolas Caputo, Argentine businessman (mainly construction), cousin of Luis Caputo and friend of Mauricio Macri
- Francisco de Narváez Steuer (born 22 September 1953), businessman and politician; from 2007 to 2017 he was involved with television and multi-media companies; Deputy in the House of Deputies of the National Congress of Argentina for the province of Buenos Aires (2005–2015)

=== Law ===
- Alberto B. Bianchi (born Buenos Aires, 1954), Argentinian legal scholar; constitutionalist

=== Media ===
- Carlos José (Bebe) Contepomi, known by his alias "Bebe" (Buenos Aires, September 28, 1970), Argentine journalist, writer and media presenter, specialising in popular music
- Carlos Campolongo, (born Buenos Aires, July 13, 1947), journalist, psychologist and lawyer

=== Military and police ===
- Gustavo Héctor Arribas (born 25 November 1958) Director of the General Directorate of the Federal Intelligence Agency (AFI) of Argentina (10 December 10, 2015 – present) (appointed by Mauricio Macri)

=== Politics and public service ===
- Enrique Avogadro (born Buenos Aires, October 25, 1976), politician; Minister of Culture of the City of Buenos Aires (12 December 2017 – present)
- Sergio Gaete (9 September 1939 - 21 December 2005), born in Santiago, Chile - lawyer, academic, and Chilean politician, Minister of State in the cabinet of General Augusto Pinochet
- Manuel D'Ornellas (1937–1999), Peruvian diplomat, lawyer and journalist
- Mauricio Macri, President of Argentina (2015 – 2019)
- Alfonso Prat-Gay - Minister of the Economy of Argentina (2015 - 2016)
- Jorge Alberto Triaca Jr, economist, appointed by Mauricio Macri as Minister of Labour, Employment and Social Security of Argentina (2015 – 2018)

=== Sport ===
- Marcos Ayerza, professional rugby union player
- Felipe Contepomi, professional rugby union player and coach
- Manuel Contepomi - professional rugby player
- Agustín Gosio, professional rugby union player
- Julián Montoya, professional rugby union player
