= Guillermo Carlos Cazenave =

Argentine musician

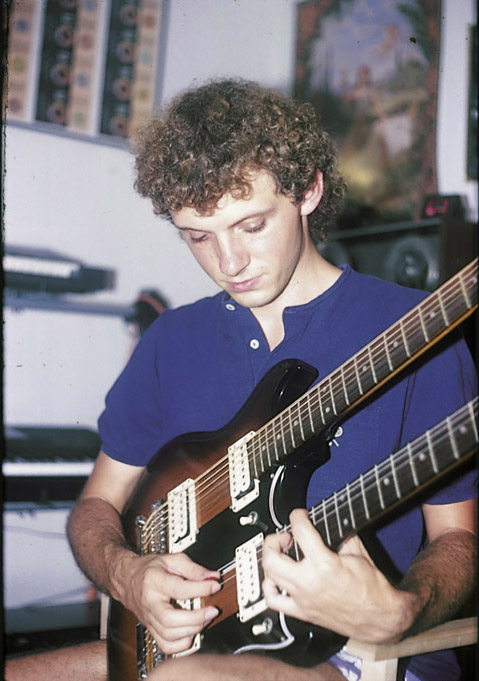
- Born: September 18, 1955 (age 70); Buenos Aires, Argentina
- Occupations: Musician; record producer; composer
- Musical career
- Genres: New-age; folk; cosmic; space music
- Instruments: guitar, keyboards, drums
- Years active: 1969–present
- Labels: RTVEMúsica; Astral Music
- Website: guillermocazenave.com

Guillermo Carlos Cazenave (born September 18, 1955) is an Argentine musician who has been living in Europe for more than four decades, in London, Sitges (Barcelona) and near Collioure (Southern France). He is also known as Guill Cazenave. He is also an author and journalist, specialized in many different musical styles.

== Early years ==
Guill started making music from a very young age; when he was 7, his grandmother from the Isle of Skye gave him a bagpipe.

In 1963, his older siblings travelled to New York. A while later they returned to Argentina with the first albums by the Beatles, and Guillermo, after seeing the band The Dave Clark Five on television, started playing the drums in 1965, later to study with the drummer and percussionist Sam Lerman.

In 1969, Guillermo started his first pop band with two classmates from the Colegio Cardenal Newman in Buenos Aires, making his debut with a performance at a party, in September of the same year.

At the same time, he continued his drumming studies with the recognised master Alberto Alcalá, percussionist of the Orchestra of the Teatro Colón, to continue experimenting with other different styles under the teachings of Droopy Gianello, drummer of Arco Iris, a folk-rock band led by Gustavo Santaolalla.

Cazenave recorded his first songs using his brother's Toshiba 2 track tape recorder. It was with it that he recorded several of his demos, using guitar, flute and his voice, in a Celtic-folk style, probably influenced by his beginnings playing the bagpipes.

In 1973, Cazenave graduated from high school and travelled to the US where he continued composing and recording songs both in Spanish and English, thanks to his bilingual studies at the Newman College.

In 1974, back in Buenos Aires, he made his first professional recording at the ION Recording Studios, with the pianist Antonio Marzochi and the guitarist Kelo Palacios, for a play that was performed for the first time at the San Martín Theatre. Not long after that, Guill returned to New York, and stayed there until May 1977, when he emigrated to Europe, staying for long periods of time between London and Sitges, where he established contact and made friends with musicians such as Anthony Phillips and Miguel Abuelo.

== From folk and pop to space music ==
In Sitges in 1983, Guill created the first Spanish new age music record label, and started selling his music on magazines like Integral, Karma 7 and Popular 1.

Between 1984 and 1999, Guillermo Cazenave produced more than 50 albums and sold around 300,000 copies of his work, mainly in the alternative market. It was very common to find him at congresses, symposiums and festivals. He often appeared on the Spanish media, and travelled and performed in countries such as France, England, US or Mexico.

In the late 90s, he relocated to the Cathar Country in the South of France, near Montségur, and began a period of temporary retirement with just the occasional appearance, and few CDs released. In 2007, after an impasse of several years, he reappeared with his album Ser, and with the novel "La Noche del Grial" ("The Night of the Grail"), with prologues by Jean-Luc Robin and Javier Sierra, in which he narrates his experiences in that area.

In 2008, Cazenave started performing live again, giving talks at congresses, recording new albums, writing for magazines like Más Allá de la Ciencia (Beyond Science), where he managed the music section, or in Universo Holístico (Holistic Universe), and appearing on radio programs like Espacio en Blanco, by his friend Miguel Blanco Medrano, in the Spanish national radio (Radio Nacional de España), in a section called From the Cathar Country.

Cazenave has recorded with renowned musicians in different styles and tendencies, such as the British oboist Ronald Lloyd; the ex member of Genesis and guitarist Anthony Phillips, the pop musician Jeremy Morris, the rock pioneer in Argentina Litto Nebbia, and many other skilled artists and friends.

The diversity of his work, which includes new age, pop-rock, Celtic fusion and even classical music, makes Guill's career and style difficult to classify. His production currently goes beyond one thousand registered pieces, and more than 80 albums in the market, as well as several books and innumerable video productions.

== The musician of the spheres ==
Cazenave's music has already travelled through space during the last trip of the Space Shuttle Endeavour, on May 16, 2011. His "Fly High" was one of the pieces chosen by the astronauts and technicians.

During the last trip of the Endeavour Shuttle, with the mission of installing some equipment to receive radiation from outer space and investigate the origins of the universe; the six astronauts in the crew of the spaceship, along with numerous NASA technicians, selected 50 musical compositions to take and listen to during the trip.

Among greatest hits and classics of all times, like Wonderful World by Louis Armstrong, Imagine by John Lennon and unforgettable songs by U2, Rolling Stones and other English-speaking countries, they selected "Fly High" (Vuela Alto) by the musician Guillermo Cazenave, composed in 1996 for his album "Here" (Aquí).

Cazenave also receive a diploma from the NASA, along with a few congratulating lines by John Shannon, Program Manager of the Space Shuttle, saying: "You are now, with your music, part of the rich history of our program since the times of the Apollo."

== Author ==
As a writer, these are some of his most recent books: La Noche del Grial (The Night of the Grail, currently in the process of being translated into English), published by Mandala Ediciones (Madrid), Música para una Nueva Era (Music for a New Age) by Kier (Buenos Aires), or El Sonido del Universo (The Sound of the Universe), with its two first editions being published by Indigo in Barcelona.

== Discography ==
- The Millbrook Tapes (1980)
- Tales of former times (compilation)
- Demos-Le (1969–99)
- Vikings (1983)
- Arkanos (1983)
- Zodiac Music (1984)
- Kabbalah (1985)
- Flying (1993)
- Kontact (1993)
- Surfing GAIA (1993)
- Vivo Vien (2003)
- éL eS syD -Syd Barrett Tribute (2009)
- The Meadows of Englewood -with Anthony Phillips- (1996)
- Spanish Impromptu -with Steven Halpern- (1994)
- BBC Recordings (1998–99)
- Tower (2001)
- Aquí (1996)
- Two Suns -with Jeremy Morris- (2002)
- The Live Radio Sessions -with Anthony Phillips- (1999)
- Pack (2000)
- Parthenon -with Ronald Lloyd- (2004)
- Duplex -duets with friends & colleagues- (2004)
- Ser (2007)
- Two Seconds -with Jeremy Morris- (2008)
- Guita-Ra (2009)
- The Meadows of Englewood XV Anniversary -CD + DVD with Anthony Phillips- (2012)
- 1000Agros (2021)
- The Classical Collection Vol. 1 (2023)
- Subur -Sitges Demos 1979-83- (2023)
