= Paul Honiss =

- Born: Paul Gerard Honiss; 18 June 1963 (age 63)
- School: St John's College

Rugby union career
Refereeing career
Years	Competition	Apps
1999–2007	Rugby World Cup	
1997–2008	Test Matches	46

Paul Gerard Honiss (born 18 June 1963) is a retired rugby union referee from Hamilton, New Zealand.

Honiss held the record of the most test matches refereed (46) when he retired as an international rugby union referee in July 2008. That record has since been surpassed by Jonathan Kaplan. He first started refereeing in 1984, making his international referee debut in a 1997 Rugby World Cup qualifier between Tahiti and the Cook Islands.

Honiss was subsequently selected to officiate at the 1999 Rugby World Cup in Wales, and the 2003 Rugby World Cup in Australia. He was also selected as a referee for the 2007 Rugby World Cup in France.

During the 2007 World Cup Honiss equaled Welshman Derek Bevan's record for most Tests as a referee when he took charge of his 44th Test, a Pool D match between Argentina and Ireland on 30 September. He surpassed Bevan when he presided over the third-place match between Argentina and France on 19 October.

His final match in charge was between Australia and France, at Suncorp Stadium in Brisbane, Australia, with the home team winning 40–10.

== Trivia ==
A hockey and tennis court in Saint John's College of Hamilton, New Zealand is named after his father Paul Honiss, an old boy of the school's predecessor Marist Brothers High School.
