= South African cricket team in Pakistan in 2007–08 =

International cricket tour

South Africa in Pakistan in 2007–08
	South Africa	Pakistan
- Dates: 27 September – 29 October 2007
Captains	Graeme Smith	Shoaib Malik

Test series
- Result: South Africa won the 2-match series 1–0
Most runs	Jacques Kallis (421)	Younis Khan (265)
Most wickets	Paul Harris (12)	Abdur Rehman (11)
- Player of the series: Jacques Kallis (SA)

One Day International series
- Results: South Africa won the 5-match series 3–2
Most runs	Graeme Smith (228)	Mohammad Yousuf (286)
Most wickets	Makhaya Ntini (12)	Iftikhar Anjum (12)
- Player of the series: Mohammad Yousuf (Pak)

The South Africa cricket team toured Pakistan for two Test matches and five One Day Internationals in October 2007.

South Africa won the Test series 1-0 and the ODI series 3-2.

== Squads ==
Tests		ODIs	
Pakistan	South Africa	Pakistan	South Africa
Shoaib Malik (c)	Graeme Smith (c)	Shoaib Malik (c)	Graeme Smith (c)
Kamran Akmal (wk)	Hashim Amla	Kamran Akmal (wk)	Johan Botha
Mohammad Asif	Mark Boucher (wk)	Shahid Afridi	Mark Boucher (wk)
Salman Butt	AB de Villiers	Mohammad Asif	AB de Villiers
Umar Gul	JP Duminy	Salman Butt	JP Duminy
Mohammad Hafeez	Herschelle Gibbs	Umar Gul	Herschelle Gibbs
Iftikhar Anjum	Paul Harris	Mohammad Hafeez	Jacques Kallis
Faisal Iqbal	Jacques Kallis	Iftikhar Anjum	Justin Kemp
Danish Kaneria	Morné Morkel	Khalid Latif	Charl Langeveldt
Misbah-ul-Haq	André Nel	Misbah-ul-Haq	Albie Morkel
Abdur Rehman	Makhaya Ntini	Imran Nazir	André Nel
Taufeeq Umar	Shaun Pollock	Abdur Rehman	Makhaya Ntini
Yasir Hameed	Ashwell Prince	Shoaib Akhtar	Vernon Philander
Younis Khan	Dale Steyn	Sohail Tanvir	Shaun Pollock
Mohammad Yousuf		Yasir Hameed	
		Younis Khan	
		Mohammad Yousuf	

- Mohammad Hafeez was replaced by Khalid Latif after the first two ODIs, Shoaib Akhtar was added to the squad for the final ODI.

== Tour matches ==
=== First-class: Pakistan Cricket Board Patron's XI v South Africans ===
27–29 September 2007
Scorecard

South Africans	v	Pakistan Cricket Board Patron's XI
467 (136 overs); Mark Boucher 109* (184); Rizwan Ahmed 7/144 (37 overs)		302/8 (98 overs); Rizwan Ahmed 56 (103); Paul Harris 3/75 (32 overs)

Match drawn
National Bank of Pakistan Sports Complex, Karachi
Umpires: Saleem Badar (Pak) and Shakeel Khan (Pak)

- Pakistan Cricket Board Patron's XI won the toss and elected to field.

=== 50-over: Pakistan Cricket Board XI v South Africans ===
16 October 2007
Scorecard

South Africans; 328/4 (45 overs)	v	Pakistan Cricket Board XI; 152 (31.3 overs)
AB de Villiers 113* (95); Abdur Rauf 2/84 (9 overs)		Mansoor Amjad 42 (37); Albie Morkel 3/22 (4.3 overs)

South Africans won by 176 runs
Bagh-e-Jinnah, Lahore
Umpires: Asad Rauf (Pak) and Zameer Haider (Pak)

- Pakistan Cricket Board XI won the toss and elected to field.
- Ahmed Shehzad and Umar Amin (Pakistan Cricket Board XI) made their List A debuts.

== Test series ==
=== 1st Test ===
1–5 October 2007
Scorecard

South Africa	v	Pakistan
450 (136.3 overs); Jacques Kallis 155 (249); Abdur Rehman 4/105 (31 overs)		291 (97.3 overs); Shoaib Malik 73 (170); Paul Harris 5/73 (36 overs)
264/7d (89 overs); Jacques Kallis 100* (201); Abdur Rehman 4/105 (38 overs)		263 (84.5 overs); Younis Khan 126 (160); Dale Steyn 5/56 (15 overs)

South Africa won by 160 runs
National Stadium, Karachi
Umpires: Mark Benson (Eng) and Simon Taufel (Aus)
Player of the match: Jacques Kallis (SA)

- South Africa won the toss and elected to bat.
- Abdur Rehman (Pak) made his Test debut.

=== 2nd Test ===
8–12 October 2007
Scorecard

South Africa	v	Pakistan
357 (125.1 overs); Ashwell Prince 63 (132); Danish Kaneria 4/114 (43.1 overs)		206 (63 overs); Kamran Akmal 52 (64); Makhaya Ntini 3/42 (8 overs)
305/4d (110.3 overs); Graeme Smith 133 (296); Abdur Rehman 2/112 (42 overs)		316/4 (107 overs); Younis Khan 130 (246); Paul Harris 2/60 (40 overs)

Match drawn
Gaddafi Stadium, Lahore
Umpires: Mark Benson (Eng) and Simon Taufel (Aus)
Player of the match: Jacques Kallis (SA)

- South Africa won the toss and elected to bat.
- This was Inzamam-ul-Haq's last test match.

== ODI series ==
=== 1st ODI ===
18 October 2007
Scorecard

South Africa; 294/5 (50 overs)	v	Pakistan; 249 (46.3 overs)
AB de Villiers 103* (95); Shahid Afridi 1/48 (10 overs)		Mohammad Yousuf 53 (75); Makhaya Ntini 4/69 (9 overs)

South Africa won by 45 runs
Gaddafi Stadium, Lahore
Umpires: Billy Bowden (NZ) and Nadeem Ghauri (Pak)
Player of the match: AB de Villiers (SA)

- South Africa won the toss and elected to bat.
- Sohail Tanvir (Pak) made his ODI debut.

=== 2nd ODI ===
21 October 2007

Pakistan; 265/9 (50 overs)	v	South Africa; 240 (49.3 overs)
Mohammad Yousuf 117 (143); Albie Morkel 2/43 (9 overs)		Graeme Smith 65 (96); Iftikhar Anjum 3/43 (10 overs)

Pakistan won by 25 runs
Gaddafi Stadium, Lahore
Umpires: Asad Rauf (Pak) and Billy Bowden (NZ)
Player of the match: Mohammad Yousuf (Pak)

- Pakistan won the toss and elected to bat.

=== 3rd ODI ===
23 October 2007

South Africa; 197 (49.2 overs)	v	Pakistan; 202/4 (48.1 overs)
Graeme Smith 48 (68); Iftikhar Anjum 3/33 (8 overs)		Mohammad Yousuf 58* (113); Albie Morkel 5/30 (9.1 overs)

Pakistan won by 6 wickets
Iqbal Stadium, Faisalabad
Umpires: Billy Bowden (NZ) and Zameer Haider (Pak)
Player of the match: Shahid Afridi (Pak)

- South Africa won the toss and elected to bat.

=== 4th ODI ===
26 October 2007
Scorecard

Pakistan; 230/9 (50 overs)	v	South Africa; 233/3 (37.4 overs)
Younis Khan 82 (110); Johan Botha 2/41 (8 overs)		Shaun Pollock 90 (84); Iftikhar Anjum 2/27 (5.4 overs)

South Africa won by 7 wickets
Multan Cricket Stadium, Multan
Umpires: Aleem Dar (Pak) and Billy Bowden (NZ)
Player of the match: Shaun Pollock (SA)

- Pakistan won the toss and elected to bat.

=== 5th ODI ===
29 October 2007
Scorecard

South Africa; 233/9 (50 overs)	v	Pakistan; 219 (46.3 overs)
Jacques Kallis 86 (130); Shoaib Akhtar 4/43 (9 overs)		Younis Khan 58 (65); Makhaya Ntini 4/61 (9 overs)

South Africa won by 14 runs
Gaddafi Stadium, Lahore
Umpires: Billy Bowden (NZ) and Nadeem Ghauri (Pak)
Player of the match: Makhaya Ntini (SA)

- South Africa won the toss and elected to bat.
