= Australian cricket team in India in 2007 =

	Australia	India
- Dates: 29 September – 20 October 2007
Captains	Ricky Ponting	MS Dhoni

One Day International series
- Results: Australia won the 7-match series 4–2
Most runs	Andrew Symonds (365)	Sachin Tendulkar (278)
Most wickets	Mitchell Johnson (14)	S. Sreesanth (9)
- Player of the series: Andrew Symonds (Aus)

Twenty20 International series
- Results: India won the 1-match series 1–0
Most runs	Ricky Ponting (76)	Gautam Gambhir (63)
Most wickets	Michael Clarke (1)	Irfan Pathan (2)
- Player of the series: Gautam Gambhir (Ind)

The Australian cricket team toured India from 29 September to 20 October 2007. Seven ODIs from 29 September to 17 October were played. The series also included a Twenty20 International match played on 20 October, at Mumbai. Australia won the ODI series 4–2, India won the T20I match.

== Squads ==
ODI squads		Twenty20 squads
India	Australia	India	Australia
Mahendra Singh Dhoni (c) & (wk)	Ricky Ponting (c)	Mahendra Singh Dhoni (c) & (wk)	Ricky Ponting (c)
Piyush Chawla	Adam Gilchrist	Ajit Agarkar	Adam Gilchrist (wk)
Rahul Dravid	Nathan Bracken	Gautam Gambhir	Nathan Bracken
Gautam Gambhir	Stuart Clark	Harbhajan Singh	Stuart Clark
Sourav Ganguly	Michael Clarke	Joginder Sharma	Michael Clarke
Harbhajan Singh	Brad Haddin	Dinesh Karthik	Brad Haddin
Dinesh Karthik	Matthew Hayden	Irfan Pathan	Matthew Hayden
Murali Kartik	Ben Hilfenhaus	Yusuf Pathan	Ben Hilfenhaus
Zaheer Khan	Brad Hodge	Virender Sehwag	Brad Hodge
Irfan Pathan	Brad Hogg	Rohit Sharma	Brad Hogg
Ramesh Powar	James Hopes	R. P. Singh	James Hopes
R. P. Singh	Mitchell Johnson	S. Sreesanth	Mitchell Johnson
S. Sreesanth	Brett Lee	Robin Uthappa	Brett Lee
Sachin Tendulkar	Andrew Symonds	Yuvraj Singh	Andrew Symonds
Robin Uthappa	Adam Voges
Yuvraj Singh
Source: ESPNcricinfo. Published: 18 September 2007.	Source: ESPNcricinfo. Published: 24 September 2007.	Source: ESPNcricinfo. Published: 20 October 2007.	Source: ESPNcricinfo. Published: 19 October 2007.

== ODI series ==
=== 1st ODI ===
29 September (D/N)
Scorecard

Australia; 307/7 (50 overs)	v	India; 9/1 (2.4 overs)
Michael Clarke 130 (132); S. Sreesanth 3/55 (10 overs)		Gautam Gambhir 4* (10); Mitchell Johnson 1/1 (1 over)

No result
M. Chinnaswamy Stadium, Bangalore
Umpires: Steve Bucknor (WI) and Suresh Shastri (Ind)

- Australia won the toss and elected to bat.
- Match abandoned after 3.2 overs due to rain.
- MS Dhoni (Ind) captained India for the first time in ODIs.

=== 2nd ODI ===
2 October
Scorecard

Australia; 306/6 (50 overs)	v	India; 222 (47.3 overs)
Brad Haddin 87* (69); S. Sreesanth 3/67 (9 overs)		MS Dhoni 58 (78); Brad Hogg 3/40 (9.3 overs)

Australia won by 84 runs
Nehru Stadium, Kochi
Umpires: Steve Bucknor (WI) and Suresh Shastri (Ind)
Player of the match: Brad Haddin (Aus)

- India won the toss and elected to field.

=== 3rd ODI ===
5 October
Scorecard

Australia; 290/7 (50 overs)	v	India; 243 (47.4 overs)
Andrew Symonds 89 (67); Irfan Pathan 2/57 (10 overs)		Yuvraj Singh 121 (115); Brett Lee 3/37 (8 overs)

Australia won by 47 runs
Rajiv Gandhi International Cricket Stadium, Hyderabad
Umpires: Steve Bucknor (WI) and Suresh Shastri (Ind)
Player of the match: Andrew Symonds (Aus)

- Australia won the toss and elected to bat.
- Ricky Ponting (Aus) became the fifth captain to lead his team in 150 ODIs.

=== 4th ODI ===
8 October
Scorecard

India; 291/4 (50 overs)	v	Australia; 283/7 (50 overs)
Sachin Tendulkar 79 (119); James Hopes 2/43 (9 overs)		Matthew Hayden 92 (92); Harbhajan Singh 2/43 (10 overs)

India won by 8 runs
Sector 16 Stadium, Chandigarh
Umpires: Steve Bucknor (WI) and Suresh Shastri (Ind)
Player of the match: MS Dhoni (Ind)

- India won the toss and elected to bat.
- This was India's first ODI win against Australia in 12 matches, their last win coming in January 2004.
- Sachin Tendulkar (Ind) reached 1,000 runs for a year for the seventh time.
- Matthew Hayden (Aus) reached 1,500 runs for the year, and became the seventh batsman to do so.

=== 5th ODI ===
11 October
Scorecard

India; 148 (39.4 overs)	v	Australia; 149/1 (25.5 overs)
Sachin Tendulkar 47 (74); Mitchell Johnson 5/26 (10 Overs)		Adam Gilchrist 79* (77); RP Singh 1/15 (2 Overs)

Australia won by 9 wickets
IPCL Sports Complex Ground, Vadodara
Umpires: Aleem Dar (Pak) and Amiesh Saheba (Ind)
Player of the match: Mitchell Johnson (Aus)

- India won the toss and elected to bat.
- It was India's lowest total against Australia at home.

=== 6th ODI ===
14 October
Scorecard

Australia; 317/8 (50 overs)	v	India; 299/7 (50 overs)
Andrew Symonds 107* (88); Zaheer Khan 2/62 (10 overs)		Sourav Ganguly 86 (111); Brad Hogg 4/49 (10 overs)

Australia won by 18 runs
Vidharba Cricket Association Ground, Nagpur
Umpires: Aleem Dar (Pak) and Amiesh Saheba (Ind)
Player of the match: Andrew Symonds (Aus)

- Australia won the toss and elected to bat.

=== 7th ODI ===
17 October (D/N)
Scorecard

Australia; 193 (41.3 overs)	v	India; 195/8 (46 overs)
Ricky Ponting 57 (78); Murali Kartik 6/27 (10 overs)		Robin Uthappa 47 (59); Mitchell Johnson 3/30 (10 overs)

India won by 2 wickets
Wankhede Stadium, Mumbai
Umpires: Aleem Dar (Pak) and Amiesh Saheba (Ind)
Player of the match: Murali Kartik (Ind)

- Australia won the toss and elected to bat.
- This was India's first win against Australia batting second, since April 1998.
- Murali Kartik (Ind) returned the third best figures by an India bowler in ODIs, and the best against Australia.
- Adam Gilchrist (Aus) went past 450 dismissals in ODIs.

Murali Karthik took 6 wickets to blow Australia away for just 193, after they got to a good start. India faltered at the start of their reply and fell to 64/6. Robin Uthappa scored 47 but was dismissed LBW to Michael Clarke. In the end, Zaheer Khan and Murali Karthik held their nerves to guide India to victory.

== Only T20 ==
20 October
Scorecard

Australia; 166/5 (20 overs)	v	India; 167/3 (18.1 overs)
Ricky Ponting 76 (53); Irfan Pathan 2/34 (4 overs)		Gautam Gambhir 63 (52); Michael Clarke 1/14 (2 overs)

India won by 7 wickets
Brabourne Stadium, Mumbai
Umpires: Amiesh Saheba (Ind) and Suresh Shastri (Ind)
Player of the match: Gautam Gambhir (Ind)

- Australia won the toss and elected to bat.
- Murali Kartik (Ind) made his T20I debut.

== See also ==
- Australian cricket team in 2007–08
