= Felipe Contepomi =

Argentina international rugby union player & coach

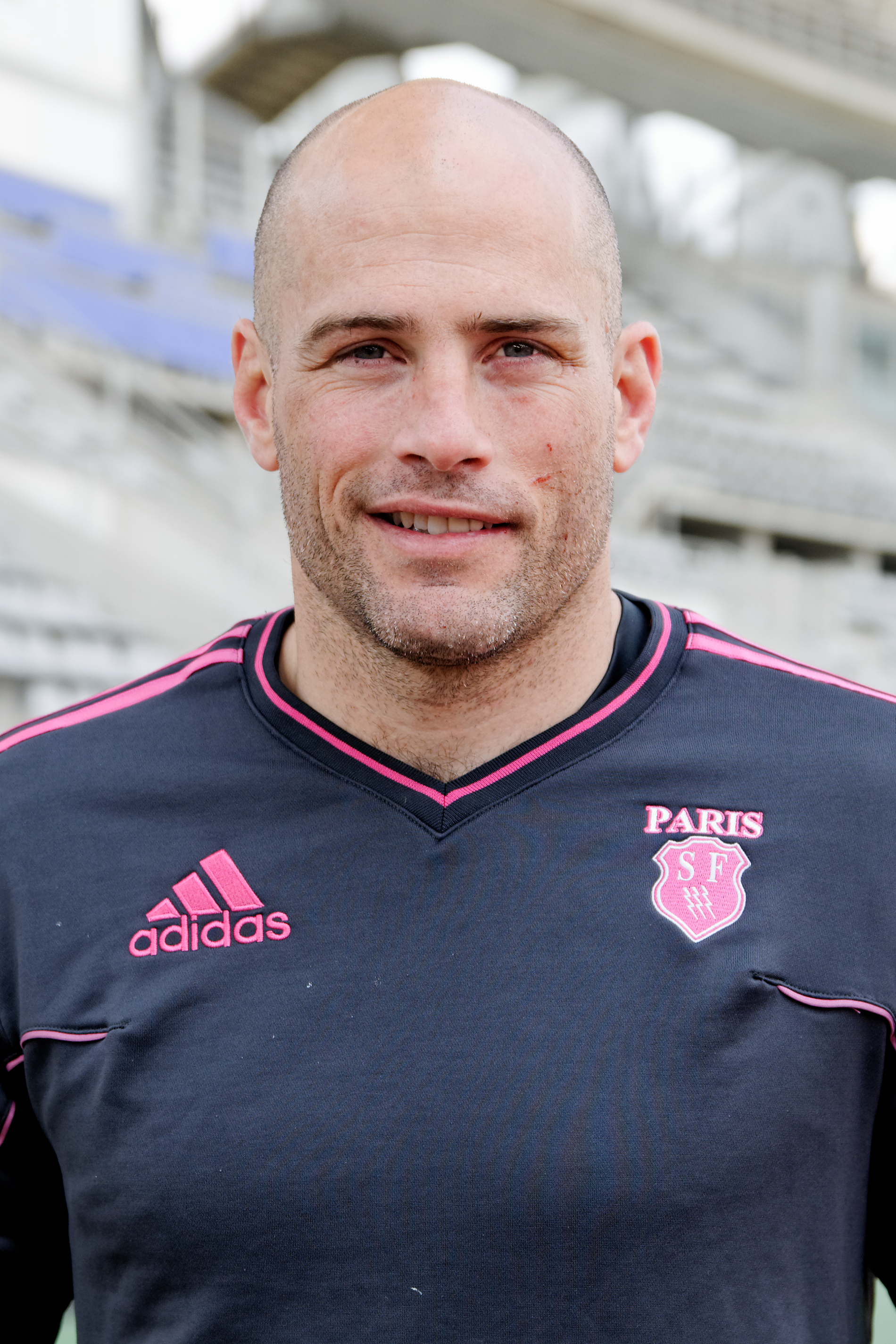
- Contepomi during a training session at Stade Français.
- Born: Felipe Contepomi; 20 August 1977 (age 49) Buenos Aires, Argentina
- Height: 1.80 m (5 ft 11 in)
- Weight: 92 kg (14 st 7 lb)
- School: Colegio Cardenal Newman (Buenos Aires)
- University: Royal College of Surgeons in Ireland
- Notable relative(s): Manuel Contepomi (twin brother), Silvana Contepomi, Juan Pablo Contepomi, Francisco Contepomi, Bebe Contepomi(Famous Radio Person) , Lia Contepomi, Maria Elena Contepomi, Mercedes Villegas, Santiago Villegas, Francisco Villegas, Joaquin Villegas

Rugby union career
- Position(s): Fly-half, Centre
Amateur team(s)
Years	Team	Apps	(Points)
1996–2000	Club Newman		
2003–2004	Carlow RFC		
2005	Lansdowne FC		
2013–14	Club Newman		
Senior career
Years	Team	Apps	(Points)
2001–2003	Bristol	60	(769)
2003–2009	Leinster	116	(1,225)
2009–2011	Toulon	41	(165)
2011–2013	Stade Français	30	(172)
2013–2015	Club Newman		
- Correct as of 12 June 2013
International career
Years	Team	Apps	(Points)
1998–2013	Argentina	87	(651)
- Correct as of 6 October 2013
National sevens team
Years	Team		Comps
1998–2002	Argentina 7s		9
- Correct as of 11 July 2014
Coaching career
- Years: Team
- 2015: Argentina XV (assistant coach)
- 2015–2017: Jaguares (defence coach)
- 2017–2018: Argentina XV
- 2018–2022: Leinster (backs coach)
- 2022–2023: Argentina (assistant coach)
- 2024–: Argentina

Felipe Contepomi (born 20 August 1977) is an Argentine professional rugby coach who is currently the head coach of the Argentine national side.

He was a rugby union footballer who played fly-half or centre; his last club was Club Newman, in the first division of the URBA championship, before signing with professional teams in Europe. He was a key player for Argentina, having played 15 years for the national team. His twin brother Manuel was also a Puma.

Contepomi was inducted into the World Rugby Hall of Fame in November 2017.

== Playing career ==
=== Club rugby ===
Born on 20 August 1977 in Buenos Aires, Contepomi started playing rugby for his secondary school Colegio Cardenal Newman, and then for Club Newman in Buenos Aires. In signed his first professional contract in 2001, signing for English side Bristol before joining Leinster following Bristol's relegation in the 2002–03 Zurich Premiership.

He played a major role in Leinster's run in the 2005–06 Heineken Cup, helping Leinster to a 41–35 win over Cup holders Toulouse, scoring 21 points in the process and winning the man of the match award. That year he was top scorer in both the 2005–06 Celtic League and the Heineken Cup.

In late January 2006, Contepomi's former girlfriend, Paula, gave birth to their daughter, Catalina. Only hours later, Contepomi played for Leinster in the Celtic League match against the Border Reivers, a game in which he went on to score 22 points.

In November of that year, Agustín Pichot said that Contepomi was a better player than All Black fly-half, Dan Carter, the winner of the 2005 IRB International Player of the Year award.

On 31 May 2007, the Royal College of Surgeons in Ireland in Dublin conferred him with the medical degrees of MB BCh BAO (NUI) LRCP&SI. He subsequently worked in Beaumont Hospital, Dublin.

Contepomi won the 2007 Rugby Writers of Ireland Player of the Year award. While playing at Leinster, his nominal 'local club' of origin was Carlow RFC, a provincial side which later got into financial difficulties and is now a minor Junior concern.

Contepomi played a role in the Leinster win over Munster in the Heineken Cup semi-final on 2 May 2009. After scoring a drop goal after 15 minutes in, he was helped off the pitch after suffering a knee injury half an hour in. An MRI scan confirmed he tore his anterior cruciate ligament and was expected to be out of action for 6 months post-op. Almost exactly on schedule, he made his Toulon debut on 21 November against Brive, coming off the bench and scoring a penalty in Toulon's 19–10 win.

In March 2009, it was announced that Contepomi would be leaving Leinster at the end of the season, and that he had signed a 4-year deal to join French side RC Toulon from the 2009–10 Top 14 season. He remained at Toulon for two seasons, before moving to Stade Français in time for the 2011–12 season, before returning home back to Argentina in 2013 ahead of his retirement.

=== International rugby ===
Contepomi was one of the stars of world rugby and was also set to lead the Argentina national team into a new era after being named captain in 2008. The former U19, U21 and Sevens international made his Pumas debut against Chile in 1998 and has been an integral part of Argentine rugby ever since.

Contepomi made his international breakthrough at fly-half and has played much of his rugby in that position. Recently switched to inside centre with Juan Martin Hernandez preferred at No.10.

He was named in José Luis Imhoff and Alex Wyllie's squad for the 1999 Rugby World Cup squad, where the Pumas made the quarter-finals for the first time. Marcelo Loffreda took charge of the national side in 2000 and Contepomi retained his place, eventually nailing down a starting berth in 2001.

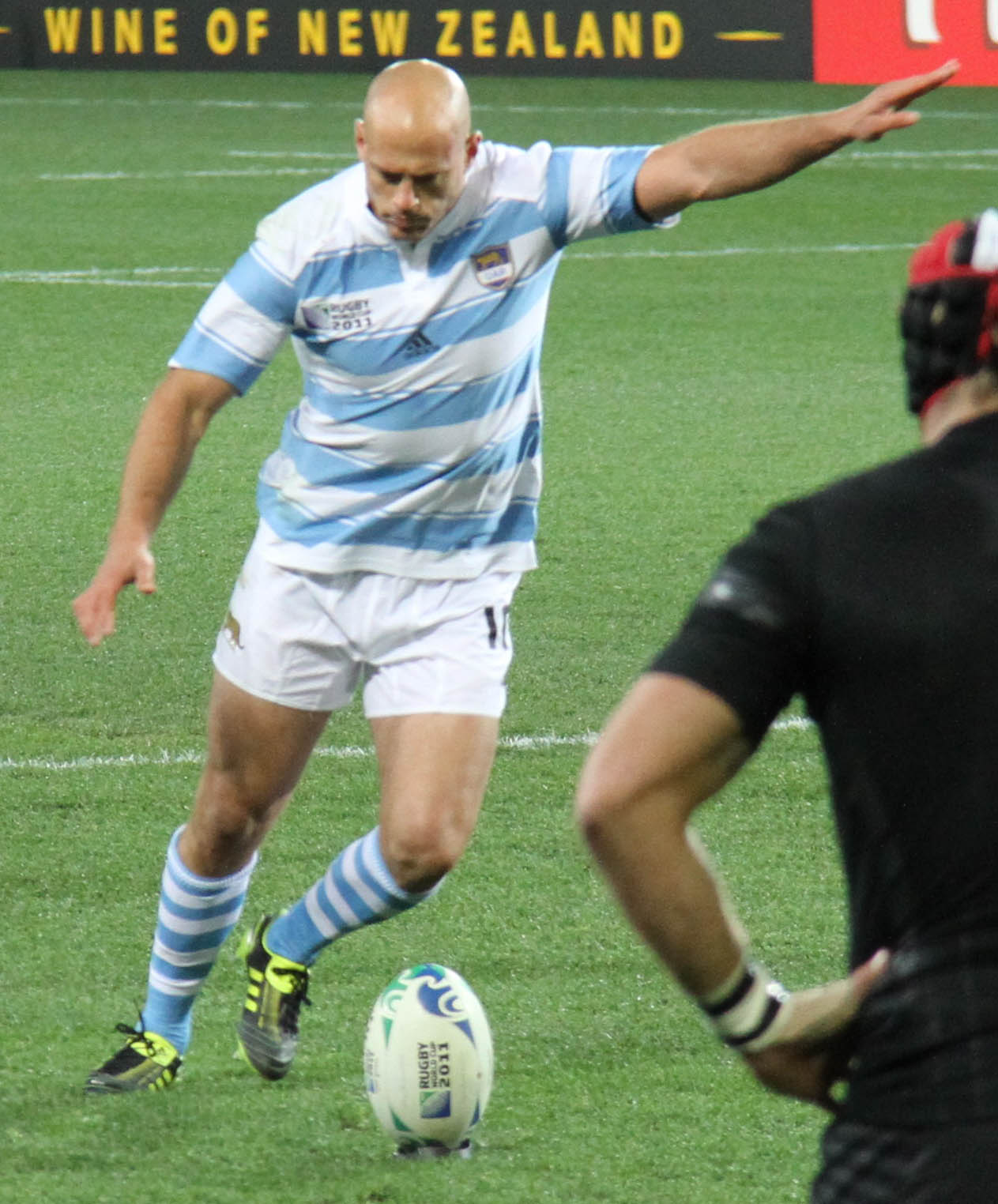
Contepomi taking a kick v England during the 2011 Rugby World Cup

He notably notched a full house on his way to 25 points in the 30–16 victory over Wales in Cardiff on 10 November 2001. He was also part of the 2003 Rugby World Cup squad, featuring in three of the Pumas' pool games as they were forced to play four games in a fortnight.

In 2004, Contepomi weighed in with 14 points as Argentina condemned France to their first defeat at the Stade Vélodrome in Marseille. He also faced the British & Irish Lions in 2005 and at the end of 2006, he was part of the Pumas side that scored their first-ever victory over England at Twickenham.

The Pumas stunned the rugby world with an inspired performance at the 2007 Rugby World Cup in France. Contepomi was a key player throughout the campaign – featuring in all seven matches as the Pumas claimed third place in the sport's global showpiece.

He was the second highest points scorer in the tournament – notably kicking four penalties in the shock opening victory over hosts France and 11 points in both the pool victory over Ireland and the quarter-final against Scotland. Contepomi was nominated by the IRB as one of five candidates for the 2007 International Player of the Year award, which was won by Bryan Habana.

Following the retirement of veteran scrum-half Agustín Pichot, Contepomi was handed the captaincy of the Pumas in 2008 by new coach Santiago Phelan ahead of the opening clash of the year against Scotland.

A knee injury suffered in Leinster's Heineken Cup semi-final victory over Munster in 2009 ruled him out of action for over a year but he returned to Pumas colours in 2010 and won a 31-point haul in their 41–13 victory over Six Nations champions France.

He was part of the Argentine squad for the 2011 Rugby World Cup in New Zealand playing as captain.

Contepomi played his last international game with Argentina on Saturday 5 October 2013 in Rosario, Santa Fe, against Australia during The Rugby Championship. At the time of his retirement, Contepomi achieved the most test matches played for Argentina (87) and the most points scored in international games (651). He worked with his father in their medical practice in Buenos Aires and as an assistant coach in the Super XV for the new Argentine franchise Jaguares (Super Rugby).

== Coaching career ==
Contepomi turned to coaching following his retirement, firstly as an assistant to Ricardo Le Fort for the Argentina XV during the 2015 World Rugby Nations Cup, which late led to him becoming assistant coach for newly formed Super Rugby side Jaguares.

In 2017, he gained his first head coaching appointment, taking on the role for Argentina XV ahead of the 2017 Americas Rugby Championship. In his first season, Argentina XV secured four wins and a draw, seeing the side finish second place behind the United States, before later going onto win the 2017 World Rugby Americas Pacific Challenge. He remained with the national second team in 2018, which like in 2017, finished as runners-up behind the USA in the Americas Rugby Championship.

In June 2018, Contepomi was appointed as the new backs coach for Leinster, succeeding Girvan Dempsey, who moved to Bath.

During his time at Leinster, the Irish team became three-time Pro 14 champions (2019, 2020 and 2021), and then made the United Rugby Championship play-offs in 2022. In addition, Leinster also reached the knock-out stage of the European Cup every season, including the final in 2019 and 2022.

Following the conclusion of the 2021/22 season, Contepomi left Leinster to return to Argentina, taking up the position of attack coach for the national side under newly appointed head coach Michael Cheika. Their first assignment was a historic three-test series against Scotland, which the Pumas won 2–1, in what was a first series victory over the Scots since 1994.

Historic wins over Australia, New Zealand and England followed to close out 2022, before going onto finish fourth in the 2023 Rugby World Cup.

After the World Cup, Michael Cheika chose not to remain on with Argentina, and the union promoted Contempomi up to head coach of the national team in December 2023. During the 2024 Rugby Championship, Contepomi achieved the Pumas' best record, with 3 wins and 3 losses, one against each other Rugby Championship side.

== Statistics ==
=== International matches as head coach ===
Matches as coach of Argentina (2024-)
Match	Date	Opposition	Venue	Score	Competition	Captain	World Ranking
2024
1	6 July	France	Estadio Malvinas Argentinas, Mendoza	13–28	2024 Spring Internationals	Julian Montoya	7th
2	13 July	France	Estadio José Amalfitani, Buenos Aires	33-25	2024 Spring Internationals	Julian Montoya	7th
3	20 July	Uruguay	Estadio Domingo Burgueño, Punta del Este	79-5	2024 Spring Internationals	Marcos Kremer	7th
4	10 August	New Zealand	Wellington Regional Stadium, Wellington	38-30	2024 Rugby Championship	Pablo Matera	7th
5	17 August	New Zealand	Eden Park, Auckland	10-42	2024 Rugby Championship	Julian Montoya	6th
6	31 August	Australia	Estadio Jorge Luis Hirschi, La Plata	19-20	2024 Rugby Championship	Julian Montoya	6th
7	7 September	Australia	Estadio Brigadier General Estanislao López, Santa Fe	67-27	2024 Rugby Championship	Julian Montoya	7th
8	21 September	South Africa	Estadio Único Madre de Ciudades, Santiago del Estero	29-28	2024 Rugby Championship	Julian Montoya	7th
9	28 September	South Africa	Mbombela Stadium, Mbombela	7-48	2024 Rugby Championship	Julian Montoya	6th
10	9 November	Italy	Stadio Friuli, Udine	50-18	2024 Autumn Internationals	Julian Montoya	6th
11	15 November	Ireland	Aviva Stadium, Dublin	19-22	2024 Autumn Internationals	Julian Montoya	5th
12	22 November	France	Stade de France, Saint-Denis	23-37	2024 Autumn Internationals	Julian Montoya	5th
2025
13	20 June	British & Irish Lions	Aviva Stadium, Dublin	28-24	2025 Spring Internationals	Julian Montoya	5th
14	5 July	England	Estadio Jorge Luis Hirschi, La Plata	12-35	2025 Spring Internationals	Julian Montoya	5th
15	12 July	England	Estadio San Juan del Bicentenario, San Juan	17-22	2025 Spring Internationals	Julian Montoya	6th
16	19 July	Uruguay	Estadio Padre Ernesto Martearena, Salta	52-17	2025 Spring Internationals	Julian Montoya	7th
17	16 August	New Zealand	Estadio Mario Alberto Kempes, Córdoba	24-41	2025 Rugby Championship	Julian Montoya	7th
18	23 August	New Zealand	Estadio José Amalfitani, Buenos Aires	29-23	2025 Rugby Championship	Julian Montoya	7th
19	6 September	Australia	Queensland Country Bank Stadium, Townsville	24-28	2025 Rugby Championship	Julian Montoya	7th
20	13 September	Australia	Sydney Football Stadium, Sydney	28-26	2025 Rugby Championship	Julian Montoya	7th
21	27 September	South Africa	Kings Park Stadium, Durban	30-67	2025 Rugby Championship	Julian Montoya	6th
22	4 October	South Africa	Twickenham Stadium, London	27-29	2025 Rugby Championship	Julian Montoya	6th
23	9 November	Wales	Millennium Stadium, Cardiff	52-28	2025 Autumn Internationals	Julian Montoya	6th
23	15 November	Scotland	Murrayfield Stadium, Edinburgh	33-24	2025 Autumn Internationals	Julian Montoya	6th
24	22 November	England	Twickenham Stadium, London	23-27	2025 Autumn Internationals	Julian Montoya	6th

=== Record by country ===
Opponent	Played	Won	Drew	Lost	Win %	For	Against
Australia	4	2	0	2	50	138	101
British & Irish Lions	1	1	0	0	100	28	24
England	3	0	0	3	0	52	84
France	3	1	0	2	33	69	90
Ireland	1	0	0	1	0	19	22
Italy	1	1	0	0	100	50	18
New Zealand	4	2	0	2	50	101	136
South Africa	4	1	0	3	25	93	172
Scotland	1	1	0	0	100	33	24
Uruguay	2	2	0	0	100	131	22
Wales	1	1	0	0	100	52	28
Total	25	12	0	13	48	766	721
Last updated: 24 November 2025

== Honours ==
=== Playing ===
Argentina

- Rugby World Cup
  - Third place: 2007
- South American Rugby Championship
  - Winners: 1998
- Pan American Championship
  - Winners: 2001, 2003

Individual

- IRB Player of the Year
  - Finalist: 2007
- all-time top point scorer
  - Argentina: 651 points

Leinster

- Pro14 / United Rugby Championship
  - Winners: 2019, 2020, 2021
- Heineken Cup
  - Winners: 2009

Stade Français

- European Rugby Challenge Cup
  - Runners-up: 2013

=== Coaching ===
Argentina XV

- World Rugby Nations Cup
  - Runners-up: 2015 (as assistant)
- Americas Rugby Championship
  - Runners-up: 2017, 2018
- World Rugby Americas Pacific Challenge
  - Winners: 2017

Leinster

- Celtic League
  - Winners: 2008
  - Runners-up: 2006
- Heineken Cup
  - Runners-up: 2022

Sporting positions
Preceded by (Australia); Michael Cheika	Argentine national head coach 2024–	Succeeded by Incumbent
