= Manuel Contepomi =

Argentine rugby union footballer

- Born: 20 August 1977 (age 49) Buenos Aires, Argentina
- Height: 1.87 m (6 ft 2 in)
- Weight: 90 kg (14 st 2 lb; 198 lb)
- School: Colegio Cardenal Newman (Buenos Aires)
- Notable relative: Felipe Contepomi (twin brother)

Rugby union career
- Position: Centre
Amateur team(s)
Years	Team	Apps	(Points)
1996-2005, 2007-2008	Newman		
- Correct as of 11 July 2014
Senior career
Years	Team	Apps	(Points)
2005-2006	Bristol		
2006-2007	Rovigo		
- Correct as of 11 July 2014
International career
Years	Team	Apps	(Points)
1998-2007	Argentina	32	(35)
- Correct as of 11 July 2014
National sevens team
Years	Team		Comps
1997-2002	Argentina		10
- Correct as of 11 July 2014

Manuel Contepomi (born 20 August 1977 in Buenos Aires) is an Argentine rugby union footballer. He started playing rugby at his secondary school, Colegio Cardenal Newman, and currently plays for Club Newman in the Unión de Rugby de Buenos Aires competition. He has also made numerous appearances for the Argentina national team. He is the twin brother of fellow Argentine rugby international Felipe Contepomi.

He formerly played for Bristol in the Guinness Premiership and Rovigo in Italy.

Contepomi played for the national under-19 and under-21 Argentina sides in the early years of his career. After making his international debut for Argentina in 1998, he was included in the 1999 Rugby World Cup squad for Wales. He made his second World Cup appearance at the 2003 Rugby World Cup in Australia, and his third at the 2007 Rugby World Cup, in France, where Argentina finished in 3rd place.

== Facts ==
- Manuel Contepomi has received the prestigious Olimpia de Plata for Rugby on two occasions, in 1998 and 2001.
