= Karl Dorrell =

American football player and coach (born 1963)

Biographical details
- Born: December 18, 1963 (age 62); Alameda, California, U.S.

Playing career
- 1983–1986: UCLA
- Position: Wide receiver

Coaching career (HC unless noted)
- 1989: UCF (WR)
- 1990–1991: Northern Arizona (WR coach - promoted to OC/WR in 1991)
- 1992–1993: Colorado (WR)
- 1994: Arizona State (WR)
- 1995–1998: Colorado (OC/WR)
- 1999: Washington (OC/WR)
- 2000–2002: Denver Broncos (WR)
- 2003–2007: UCLA
- 2008–2010: Miami Dolphins (WR)
- 2011: Miami Dolphins (QB)
- 2012–2013: Houston Texans (QB)
- 2014: Vanderbilt (OC/QB)
- 2015–2018: New York Jets (WR)
- 2019: Miami Dolphins (AHC/WR)
- 2020–2022: Colorado

Head coaching record
- Overall: 43–42
- Bowls: 1–4

Accomplishments and honors

Awards
- 2× Pac-12 Coach of the Year (2005, 2020)

Karl James Dorrell (born December 18, 1963) is an American football coach. He has been the head coach for the UCLA Bruins and Colorado Buffaloes, being named the Pac-12 Coach of the Year for both. Dorrell led the UCLA Bruins to five bowl appearances and was the first African American head football coach in their history.

== Early life and playing career ==
Karl attended Helix High School in La Mesa, California, where he played football. He was a two-time all-league selection and an honorable mention All-American as a senior. He led Helix to the CIF San Diego Section second place in 1981.

Karl went on to play football at UCLA, earning four varsity letters in football. He was one of the most successful wide receivers at UCLA with 1,517 receiving yards on 108 receptions. He suffered a shoulder injury in 1984 and was granted an extra year of eligibility by the NCAA. He played on a team that won the Rose Bowl in 1983, 1984, and 1986, and that won the Freedom Bowl in 1986.

During the 1983 season, he was a teammate of quarterback Rick Neuheisel, who would be his eventual successor as UCLA head coach. He caught touchdowns from Neuheisel during the season, including two in the 1984 Rose Bowl.

In the 1986 UCLA vs. USC game, Dorrell was on the receiving end of a play that the Los Angeles Times dubbed "Hail Mary, and in your face." On the last play of the first half, UCLA quarterback Matt Stevens faked a kneeldown, then pulled up and threw a Hail Mary pass, which was tipped into the hands of the flanker, Dorrell, to put the Bruins up 31–0 at the half. They would go on to win 45–20.

Pre-draft measurables
| Height | Weight | Arm length | Hand span | 40-yard dash | 10-yard split | 20-yard split | 20-yard shuttle | Vertical jump | Broad jump | Bench press |
|---|---|---|---|---|---|---|---|---|---|---|
| 5 ft 11 in (1.80 m) | 188 lb (85 kg) | 31 1/4 in (0.79 m) | 9 1/2 in (0.24 m) | 4.67 s | 1.61 s | 2.69 s | 4.44 s | 30.5 in (0.77 m) | 9 ft 4 in (2.84 m) | 8 reps |
All values from NFL Combine

He had a brief career as a player in the NFL with the Dallas Cowboys in the 1987 season, but he was placed on the injured reserve.

== Coaching career ==
=== Assistant coach ===
Dorrell's first job as a coach was in 1988, as a graduate assistant for Terry Donahue at UCLA. That season the Bruins finished the season with a record of 10–2 and defeated the Arkansas Razorbacks in the Cotton Bowl Classic.

In 1989, he became a wide receivers coach at UCF. In 1990 and 1991 he was the offensive coordinator and receivers coach at Northern Arizona. Under his tutelage, the NAU offense set a school record with 255 first downs in 1991, amassing the second-most total offense (4,539 yards) in a season.

From 1992 to 1993, Dorrell coached wide receivers at Colorado. In his first year with the Buffaloes, two of his receivers, Charles Johnson and Michael Westbrook, became just the fourth pair of receivers on the same team in NCAA history to each have over 1,000 receiving yards.

He then served as wide receivers coach at Arizona State in 1994 before returning to Colorado when they hired his former UCLA teammate, Rick Neuheisel, as their head coach. This time, he would serve as wide receivers coach and offensive coordinator from 1995 to 1998. When Neuheisel left Colorado for Washington, he brought four assistant coaches with him – including Dorrell, who served as the Huskies' offensive coordinator and receivers coach in 1999.

In both 1993 and 1999, Dorrell was a recipient of Denver Broncos Minority Coaching Fellowships, which allowed him to spend time in the Broncos' training camp. He would return to the team in 2000 to serve as the receivers coach under head coach Mike Shanahan He held this position for three years, coaching players like Rod Smith, a two-time selection to the NFL's Pro Bowl, and Ed McCaffrey, a one time Pro Bowl selection. With the help of Dorrell, Smith and McCaffrey became only the second wide receiver duo to each catch 100 passes in a single season (2000).

=== UCLA ===
Karl Dorrell was hired as the head coach at UCLA, replacing Bob Toledo, who was released at the end of the 2002 regular season. Between Toledo and Dorrell, Ed Kezirian, an athletic department official who oversees the academics for the football team, served as interim coach for the 2002 Las Vegas Bowl. Under Kezirian, the Bruins won the bowl game over New Mexico, 27–13. Dorrell's hiring as head coach was announced on December 19, 2002, by UCLA athletic director Dan Guerrero. Ed Kezirian remained on the football staff. Dorrell was brought in at UCLA to clean up a program marred by off-the-field problems in the final years of Bob Toledo's tenure.

==== 2003–2004 seasons ====
The UCLA Bruins football team under Dorrell recorded a mark of 6–7 in his first season as head coach in 2003, with an appearance in the Silicon Valley Bowl, and a loss to Fresno State. In 2004, his second season, the team finished with a record of 6–6 an appearance in the Las Vegas Bowl, with a loss to Wyoming.

==== 2005 season ====
In 2005, his third season as head football coach, Dorrell was able get his first win against a ranked opponent, No. 21 Oklahoma, featuring Adrian Peterson.

On October 1, 2005, head coach Tyrone Willingham and his Washington Huskies came to the Rose Bowl for a Pacific-10 Conference game to play UCLA. This was the first time two black head coaches faced each other in a Pac-10 conference game. At the time, Sylvester Croom of Mississippi State was the only other black coach heading an NCAA Division I football program. Dorrell achieved his first win against a top-ten opponent with a 47–40 upset win over No. 10-ranked Washington.

Three Bruin wins in the 2005 season set new school records for biggest comebacks earning the nickname "The Cardiac Kids." They came thanks largely to the heroics of quarterback Drew Olson and tailback Maurice Jones-Drew. In the regular season the Bruins came from down 21 points to win in overtime against both Washington State and Stanford. In the Stanford comeback, the Bruins scored 21 points in the final 7:04 of the fourth quarter. In the 2005 Sun Bowl, the Bruins set the record again by coming back from 22 points down. This also is the Sun Bowl record.

The Bruins were ranked No. 7 in the nation until a 52–14 blowout loss to a 3–8 Arizona team. The Bruins came into the UCLA–USC rivalry last regular season game ranked No. 11. They suffered a 66–19 defeat to the No. 1 2005 USC Trojans football team. This was the largest margin of defeat since the series began in 1929 with a 76–0 defeat. The Bruins finished third in the Pac-10 standings.

On December 30, 2005, his Bruins defeated the Northwestern Wildcats in the 2005 Sun Bowl, 50–38, finishing the season with a 10–2 record. At the end of the 2005 season, Dorrell and fellow UCLA coach Ben Howland received pay bonuses for coaching successful seasons. Karl was named Pac-10 co-coach of the year along with USC head coach Pete Carroll.

==== 2006 season ====
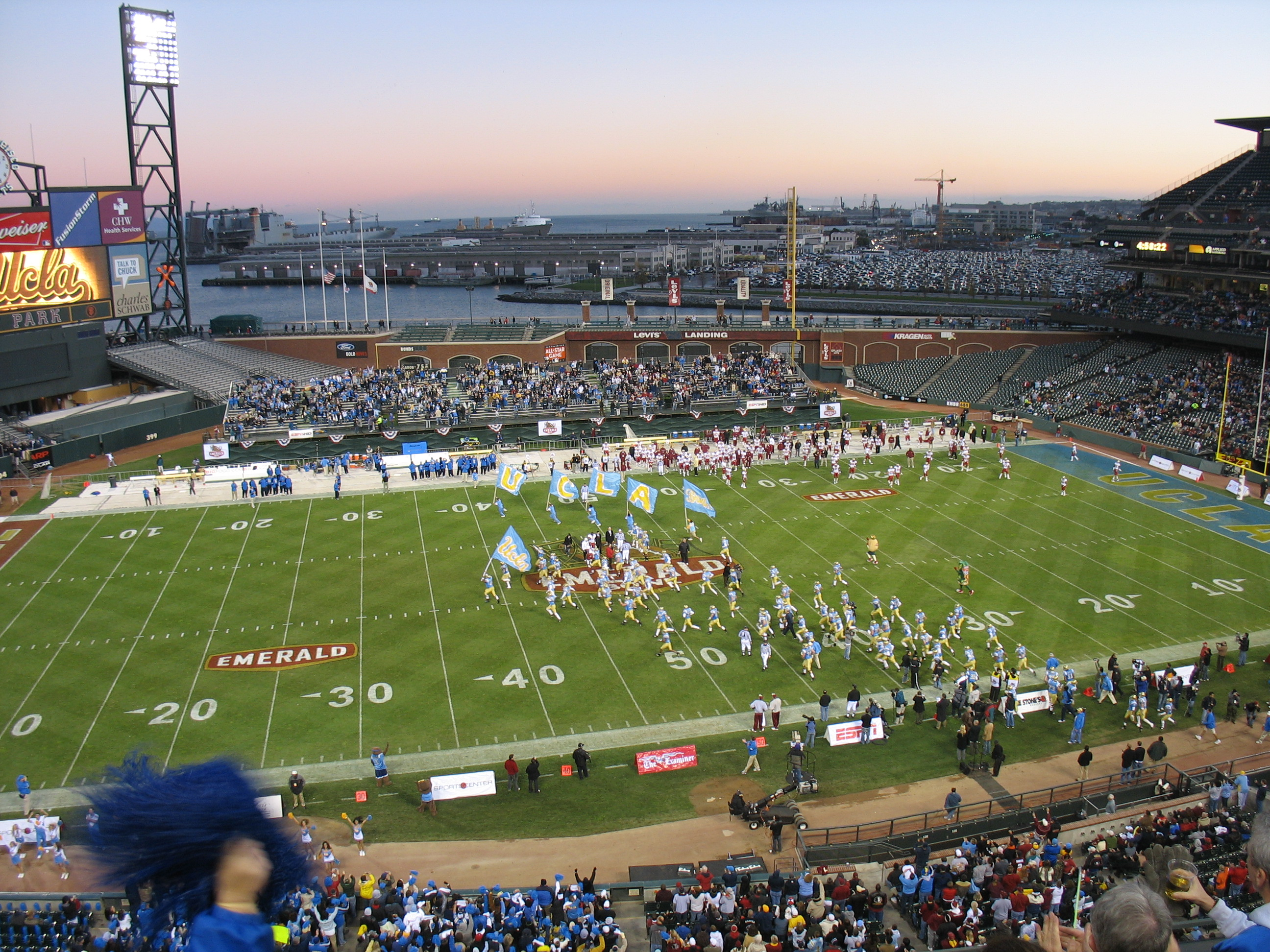
Emerald Bowl, UCLA vs FSU, 2006

In 2006, Dorrell's fourth season, he guided the Bruins to a 7–6 season (5–4 in conference) and a fourth-place Pac-10 finish.

UCLA played its first game at the University of Notre Dame since the 1960s and was leading 17–13, but the Irish scored a touchdown in the final minute to win.

The most notable victory of his coaching career at UCLA was a 13–9 defeat of No. 2-ranked and Bowl Championship Series title-game-bound USC on December 2, 2006. The win kept the Trojans out of the title game and broke a seven-game UCLA losing streak to the Trojans, thereby preserving the Bruins' eight-game win streak over USC from 1991 to 1998 as the longest run in the history of the rivalry. The victory also clinched a winning season for UCLA.

The Bruins played in the Emerald Bowl in San Francisco against a Bobby Bowden-coached Florida State team on December 27, 2006, and lost, 44–27.

==== 2007 season ====
In Dorrell's fifth season at UCLA, with 20 returning starters and a team of his own recruits, hopes were high for the Bruins in 2007. After starting the season with a couple of wins over Stanford and BYU, and achieving a No. 11 AP Poll ranking, however, UCLA stumbled against an injured, winless, and unranked Utah Utes team, 44–6. Four weeks later, Dorrell's Bruins fell again; this time 20–6 to an unranked, winless Notre Dame team. The Bruins did, however, post wins against seemingly more difficult PAC-10 opponents, including a No. 10 Cal team. However; the bad taste of losses to teams the Bruins were favored to beat (including an embarrassing 27–7 loss to Washington State) raised questions about Dorrell's play-calling and ability to motivate his players.

After the Washington State loss, UCLA Athletic Director Dan Guerrero addressed UCLA's inconsistent football performances for the first time, stating "I will be very interested to see how we finish the season. And you can use that." Many took this as a hint that Dorrell's job might be in serious jeopardy. The Bruins would go on to lose to Arizona and Arizona State by a combined score of 58–47, but surprisingly shut out an Oregon Ducks team that a week earlier lost starting quarterback and Heisman Trophy Candidate Dennis Dixon to a knee injury. Heading into the final game of the regular season against crosstown-rival USC, the Bruins still had an outside chance at a Rose Bowl berth that might have saved Dorrell's job; with a victory over USC and some help from Arizona (with a win over ASU), the Bruins could have been the first-ever five-loss team to play in the Rose Bowl. It wasn't to be, however, and the Bruins finished the 2007 Regular season with a miserable offensive performance in a 24–7 loss to USC and a record of 6–6.

On December 3, 2007, Dorrell was fired during a meeting with athletic director Dan Guerrero. He was offered the choice to coach in the Las Vegas Bowl but decided not to. Defensive coordinator DeWayne Walker served as interim coach for the game, where UCLA lost to BYU. UCLA eventually selected Rick Neuheisel, a former UCLA teammate of Dorrell, as his successor.

=== Second stint as assistant coach ===
==== Miami Dolphins (2008–2011) ====
Dorrell interviewed at Duke University and was a finalist along with eventual hire David Cutcliffe for the head coaching position vacated by Ted Roof. He was also dealt as a candidate for the vacant offensive coordinator position for the Houston Texans. Former Texans offensive coordinator Mike Sherman left for Texas A&M University in November 2007. That position, however, eventually went to Kyle Shanahan.

After rumors that he was a candidate to succeed Mike Heimerdinger as Denver Broncos assistant head coach, Dorrell eventually was hired as wide receivers coach for the Miami Dolphins, after having also interviewed with the Kansas City Chiefs.

He was named quarterbacks coach on January 26, 2011.

==== Houston Texans (2012–2013) ====
Dorrell was hired as quarterbacks coach for the Houston Texans in 2012, coaching Matt Schaub through a Pro Bowl season as the Texans went 12–4. He left the team after the 2013 season.

==== Vanderbilt (2014) ====
Dorrell was reunited with newly hired Vanderbilt University head coach Derek Mason, joining his staff as the offensive coordinator in January 2014. Mason was a player at Northern Arizona while Dorrell was coaching there early in his career.

Dorrell' stint with Vanderbilt lasted only one season. Chris Foster of the Los Angeles Times wrote, "Dorrell's West Coast offense did not fare much better in the East than it did in Westwood. The Commodores averaged 17.2 points a game and finished with a 3–9 record."

==== New York Jets (2015–2018) ====
On January 23, 2015, Dorrell was named the New York Jets wide receivers coach. In the 2015 New York Jets season, Dorrell established the Jets elite wide receiver duo of Brandon Marshall and Eric Decker. Both of them had one thousand yard seasons (Decker – 1,027) (Marshall – 1,502**), combined for an NFL record 26 touchdowns as a duo (Marshall – 14*) (Decker – 12) and a total of 189 combined catches (Marshall – 109**) (Decker – 80).

Although the 2016 New York Jets season was a disastrous season for the Jets, the wide receivers were a bright spot in their offense. Although Brandon Marshall declined, and Eric Decker was injured early in the season, third-string wide receiver Quincy Enunwa had a breakout season for the Jets, with 58 catches for 857 yards and 4 touchdowns. Undrafted rookie wide receiver Robby Anderson also had a good season, with 42 receptions, 587 yards and 2 touchdowns.

** = New York Jets record
* = NFL record

==== Second stint with Miami Dolphins (2019) ====
On February 8, 2019, the Miami Dolphins announced they had hired Dorrell as the team's wide receivers coach under new head coach Brian Flores.

=== Colorado Buffaloes ===
On February 23, 2020, Dorrell was named the 27th head coach for the University of Colorado. He signed a five-year, $18 million contract that would pay him $3.2 million for the first year with $200,000 annual raises in subsequent years. Dorrell was named Pac-12 Coach of the Year after the Buffaloes finished the 2020 COVID-shortened season with a winning record (4–1) for the first time at Colorado since 2016.

Following a blowout loss at home to USC in October 2021, a frustrated Dorrell shoved a photojournalist's camera while trotting off the field. The next day, Dorrell apologized for the incident in a statement.

Colorado fired Dorrell and defensive coordinator Chris Wilson on October 2, 2022, after an 0–5 start to the 2022 season. Dorrell's contract buyout was reported to be US$11.4 million, minus money he already had been paid, which reduced that amount to US$8.7 million.

== Family ==
Dorrell and his wife, Kim, have two children, Chandler and Lauren.

== Head coaching record ==
| Year | Team | Overall | Conference | Standing | Bowl/playoffs | Coaches^{#} | AP^{°} |
|---|---|---|---|---|---|---|---|
UCLA Bruins (Pacific-10 Conference) (2003–2007)
| 2003 | UCLA | 6–7 | 4–4 | T–5th | L Silicon Valley | | |
| 2004 | UCLA | 6–6 | 4–4 | T–5th | L Las Vegas | | |
| 2005 | UCLA | 10–2 | 6–2 | 3rd | W Sun | 13 | 16 |
| 2006 | UCLA | 7–6 | 5–4 | 4th | L Emerald | | |
| 2007 | UCLA | 6–6 (Note: Dorrell was fired at the end of the regular season. Defensive coordinator DeWayne Walker was appointed as interim head coach and coached UCLA in the Las Vegas Bowl.) | 5–4 | T–4th | Las Vegas | | |
| UCLA: | | 35–27 | 24–18 | | | | |
Colorado Buffaloes (Pac-12 Conference) (2020–2022)
| 2020 | Colorado | 4–2 | 3–1 | 2nd (South) | L Alamo | | |
| 2021 | Colorado | 4–8 | 3–6 | 5th (South) | | | |
| 2022 | Colorado | 0–5 (Note: Colorado fired Dorrell after five games.) | 0–2 | | | | |
| Colorado: | | 8–15 | 6–9 | | | | |
| Total: | | 43–42 | | | | | |
^{#}Rankings from final Coaches Poll.; ^{°}Rankings from final AP Poll.
