= Pac-12 Conference tournament =

Pac-12 Conference tournament may refer to:

- Pac-12 Conference men's basketball tournament
- Pac-12 Conference women's basketball tournament
- Pac-12 Conference baseball tournament
- Pac-12 Conference softball tournament
