= November 2007 in sports =

<<	November 2007					>>
Su	Mo	Tu	We	Th	Fr	Sa
				1	2	3
4	5	6	7	8	9	10
11	12	13	14	15	16	17
18	19	20	21	22	23	24
25	26	27	28	29	30
Sports

This list shows notable sports-related deaths, events, and notable outcomes that occurred in November of 2007.

== Deaths ==
- 30: Evel Knievel
- 27: Dr. Robert Cade
- 27: Sean Taylor
- 26: Bill Hartack
- 26: Herb McKenley
- 15: Joe Nuxhall
- 5: Nils Liedholm
- 3: Ryan Shay

== Sporting seasons ==
- American football
  - NCAA Division I FBS
  - National Football League
- Auto racing 2007:
  - World Rally Championship
  - V8 Supercar
  - A1 Grand Prix
- Basketball 2007:
  - Australian National Basketball League
  - British Basketball League
  - EuroCup
  - Euroleague
  - National Basketball Association
  - Philippine Basketball Association
    - Philippine Cup
  - Russian Basketball Super League
  - Turkish Basketball League
  - ULEB Cup
- Cricket 2007:
  - England
- Football (soccer) 2007:
  - Brazil
  - Japan
- Football (soccer) 2007–08:
  - UEFA Champions League
  - UEFA Cup
  - England
  - Italy
  - Germany
  - Spain
  - France
  - Argentina
  - Denmark
- Golf 2008:
  - European Tour
- Ice hockey 2007–08
  - National Hockey League
- Rugby union 2007–08:
  - IRB Sevens
  - Heineken Cup
  - English Premiership
  - Celtic League
  - Top 14

== 30 November 2007 (Friday) ==
- Football (soccer)
  - CONMEBOL Copa Nissan Sudamericana 2007 Final, first leg
    - Club América 2 — 3 Arsenal de Sarandí, Estadio Azteca, Mexico City
- Mixed martial arts:
  - Sam Vasquez, a fighter out of Houston, becomes the first MMA fighter to die from injuries sustained in a sanctioned bout in the United States. He collapsed shortly after being knocked out in an October 20 fight, was operated on twice for blood clots in the brain, and then suffered a stroke that left him comatose until his death. (Sherdog.com)

== 29 November 2007 (Thursday) ==
- American football
  - National Football League Week 13:
    - Dallas Cowboys 37, Green Bay Packers 27
      - In the first meeting between 10–1 teams since 1990, the Cowboys prevailed at home as Packers quarterback Brett Favre sat out the second half with a separated left shoulder and a right (throwing arm) elbow injury.

== 28 November 2007 (Wednesday) ==
- Football (soccer):
  - The City of London Police arrest five men in connection with an ongoing investigation into alleged corruption in English football. The arrests are focused on the 2003 transfer of Senegal international Amdy Faye from Auxerre to Portsmouth. The arrested men are Faye, now on loan from Charlton to Rangers; Willie McKay, Faye's agent at the time; current Pompey manager Harry Redknapp; current Portsmouth chief executive Peter Storrie; and former Pompey chairman Milan Mandarić, now chairman at Leicester. (BBC)

== 27 November 2007 (Tuesday) ==
- Football (soccer)
  - International Club Friendly at Telstra Stadium, Sydney, New South Wales, Australia
    - Sydney FC (A-League) 5 – 3 Los Angeles Galaxy (MLS)
      - David Beckham scores on a bending free kick in the first half, but the Galaxy fall in a slugfest in the first match of a two-match tour of Australasia.
- American football:
  - Washington Redskins safety Sean Taylor dies nearly 26 hours after being shot in his Miami-area home. (AP via Yahoo)

== 26 November 2007 (Monday) ==
- American football
  - National Football League Week 11:
    - Pittsburgh Steelers 3, Miami Dolphins 0
      - With the field turned into a murky bog due to heavy rain, the Steelers and Dolphins combine for the lowest-scoring NFL game since 1993. Jeff Reed's 24-yard field goal with 17 seconds left accounts for the only points.
- Cricket
  - Pakistan cricket team in India in 2007–08
    - 1st Test:India 276 (78.4 ov.) & 203/4 (61.1 ov.) beat Pakistan 231 (96.2 ov.) & 247 (83.1 ov.) by 6 wickets

== 25 November 2007 (Sunday) ==
- Canadian football:
  - 95th Grey Cup at the Rogers Centre in Toronto:
    - Saskatchewan Roughriders 23, Winnipeg Blue Bombers 19
      - The Riders win their first Canadian Football League championship since 1989. Defensive back James Johnson is the easy choice for MVP with three interceptions of Bomber quarterback Ryan Dinwiddie. Johnson returns the first pick for a touchdown; his final interception seals the game for Saskatchewan. (TSN)
- American football:
  - National Football League Week 12:
    - Seattle Seahawks 24, St. Louis Rams 19
      - On fourth down, with the ball on Seattle's 1-yard line and 29 seconds to go, backup quarterback Gus Frerotte fumbles the snap and is tackled behind the line of scrimmage.
    - Minnesota Vikings 41, New York Giants 17
      - The Giants' Eli Manning becomes the first NFL quarterback since 1972 to have three interceptions returned for touchdowns in a game.
    - Cleveland Browns 27, Houston Texans 17
      - The Browns' little-regarded pass defense intercepts Matt Schaub twice and holds Andre Johnson to three catches for 37 yards.
    - Tampa Bay Buccaneers 19, Washington Redskins 13
      - The Bucs recover four Washington fumbles in the first 18 minutes and intercept Jason Campbell twice in the fourth quarter.
    - Cincinnati Bengals 35, Tennessee Titans 6
      - Carson Palmer completes 32 of 38 passes for 283 yards and three touchdowns.
    - New Orleans Saints 31, Carolina Panthers 6
      - Drew Brees throws three touchdown passes, while Panthers quarterbacks David Carr and Matt Moore combine to throw three interceptions.
    - Jacksonville Jaguars 36, Buffalo Bills 14
      - Buffalo threatens to tie the game early in the fourth quarter, but the Jags follow a Justin Durant interception with a 59-yard touchdown pass from David Garrard to Reggie Williams
    - Oakland Raiders 20, Kansas City Chiefs 17
      - Living by his motto, "You play to win the game", Chiefs coach Herman Edwards elects to go for it on fourth-and-1 from the Oakland 23 late in the fourth quarter. Running back Kolby Smith fails to cross the line, and Oakland then runs out the clock.
    - San Diego Chargers 32, Baltimore Ravens 14
      - Philip Rivers throws three touchdown passes, while LaDainian Tomlinson rushes for 77 yards to go over 10,000 yards on his career.
    - San Francisco 49ers 37, Arizona Cardinals 31 (OT)
      - Kurt Warner throws for 484 yards, but his fumble in overtime is recovered by 49ers linebacker Tully Banta-Cain in the end zone.
    - Chicago Bears 37, Denver Broncos 34 (OT)
      - Chicago's Devin Hester returns a punt and a kickoff for touchdowns in the second quarter, becoming the first player since the AFL–NFL merger to do both in a quarter. The second return was Hester's tenth return of a kick or punt for a touchdown, breaking Gale Sayers' franchise record.
    - New England Patriots 31, Philadelphia Eagles 28
      - For the first time this year, the Patriots are seriously challenged at home. New England needs a fourth-quarter go-ahead touchdown run from Laurence Maroney and an Asante Samuel end-zone interception to remain undefeated.
  - NCAA Division I FBS BCS Top 25:
    - Missouri takes the No. 1 spot in the BCS rankings, meaning they will almost assuredly make the BCS National Championship Game if they defeat Oklahoma in next week's Big 12 Championship Game. West Virginia moves to No. 2 with one regular-season game against Pitt remaining. Ohio State and Georgia are ranked third and fourth, respectively. Also, for the first time this season, unbeaten Hawaiʻi reaches the #12 spot in the rankings. If the Warriors beat Washington and stay in the top 12, they are guaranteed a BCS at-large bid.
- Football (soccer):
  - Drawings for the 2010 FIFA World Cup Qualifying at Durban, South Africa.
- Cricket
  - New Zealand cricket team in South Africa in 2007–08
    - South Africa 249/8 (50 ov.) beat New Zealand 248/6 (50 ov.) by 2 wickets

== 24 November 2007 (Saturday) ==
- American football
  - NCAA Division I FBS BCS Top 25:
    - (3) Missouri 36, (2) Kansas 28 (Border Showdown)
      - Mizzou takes a 21–0 lead, and holds on to claim a spot in the Big 12 Championship Game.
    - (4) West Virginia 66, (20) Connecticut 21
      - The Mountaineers, who pound out 517 rushing yards, not only earn the Big East's BCS bowl berth, but make a strong statement for a possible berth in the BCS championship game. They will have one more chance to state their case next week in the Backyard Brawl against Pitt.
    - (6) Georgia 31, Georgia Tech 17 (Clean, Old-Fashioned Hate)
    - (8) Virginia Tech 33, (16) Virginia 21 (Commonwealth Cup)
      - The Hokies get the Commonwealth Cup and a rematch with Boston College in the ACC Championship Game.
    - UCLA 16, (9) Oregon 0
    - (10) Oklahoma 49, Oklahoma State 17 (Bedlam Series)
      - The Sooners win going away and book a spot in the Big 12 Championship Game.
    - (12) Florida 45, Florida State 12
      - Tim Tebow makes his final Heisman statement, throwing for three touchdowns and running for two more.
    - (15) Boston College 28, Miami (FL) 14
      - The Eagles pick up their first win over the Hurricanes since Doug Flutie's famous Hail Mary in 1984.
    - (19) Tennessee 52, Kentucky 50 (4 OT)
      - The Vols extend the longest current winning streak between annual opponents in Division I to 23, and book a ticket to the SEC Championship Game against LSU.
    - (21) Clemson 23, South Carolina 21 (The Battle of the Palmetto State)
    - (23) BYU 17, Utah 10 (Holy War)
    - (24) Cincinnati 52, Syracuse 31
    - (25) Auburn 17, Alabama 10 (Iron Bowl)
  - Elsewhere in Division I FBS...
    - UCF 36, UTEP 20
      - With 219 yards, UCF junior running back Kevin Smith earns the fourth-highest single-season rushing total in the history of Division I football. UCF will host the Conference USA Football Championship on December 1 against Tulsa.

== 23 November 2007 (Friday) ==
- American football
  - NCAA Division I FBS BCS Top 25:
    - Arkansas 50, (1) LSU 48 (3 OT) (Battle for the Golden Boot)
      - Darren McFadden further states his Heisman case by running for three touchdowns and throwing for a fourth to lead the Hogs to an upset that ends the Tigers' national title hopes.
    - Texas A&M 38, (13) Texas 30 (Lone Star Showdown)
      - The Aggies' upset win gives Oklahoma the inside track to the Big 12 Championship Game if the Sooners can beat archrivals Oklahoma State tomorrow. Aggies head coach Dennis Franchione resigns immediately after the game.
    - (14) Hawaiʻi 39, (17) Boise State 27
      - The Warriors win the outright WAC title for the first time ever, and keep their hopes of an at-large BCS bowl berth alive. Warriors quarterback Colt Brennan sets NCAA records for career TD passes and career TDs responsible for, and he and Davone Bess tie an NCAA career record for TDs by a QB-receiver combination.
- Athletics:
  - The IAAF officially annuls all of Marion Jones' competition results since September 2000, including her medals at the 2001 World Championships, in the wake of her confession to having used steroids in 2000 and 2001. The IAAF also orders her to repay US$700,000 in earnings from September 2000 forward. (AP via ESPN.com)
- Canadian football
  - 43rd Vanier Cup (CIS Top 10 rankings in parentheses): (3) Manitoba Bisons 28 vs. (4) Saint Mary's Huskies 14 – In the rematch of the 2001 Vanier Cup, the Herd win their first Vanier Cup in 34 years off the effort of quarterback Steve Gronick's two touchdowns and kicker Scott Dixon's four field goals. Hec Crighton Trophy winner Erik Glavic of the Huskies did not participate due to injury, leaving Huskies backup quarterback Ted Abraham, who threw three interceptions in the loss, to start the game. The Bisons end the season as the only undefeated team in Canadian university football.
- Cricket
  - New Zealand cricket team in South Africa in 2007–08 (Twenty20 match in Johannesburg)
    - South Africa 131/7 (19.5 ov.) beat New Zealand 129/7 (20 ov.) by 3 wickets

== 22 November 2007 (Thursday) ==
- Football (soccer):
  - After the England national football team lost to Croatia, eliminating them from Euro 2008, The Football Association (England's national association) fires manager Steve McClaren and his top assistant, Terry Venables.
- American football
  - National Football League Week 12 Thanksgiving Day Games
    - Green Bay Packers 37, Detroit Lions 26
    - Dallas Cowboys 34, New York Jets 3
    - Indianapolis Colts 31, Atlanta Falcons 13
  - NCAA Division I FBS BCS Top 25:
    - (11) USC 44, (7) Arizona State 24

== 21 November 2007 (Wednesday) ==
- Football (soccer):
  - UEFA Euro 2008 qualifying:
    - Group A: Armenia 0 – 1 Kazakhstan
    - Group A: Azerbaijan 0 – 1 Belgium
    - Group A: Serbia 2 – 2 Poland
    - Group A: Portugal 0 – 0 Finland
      - Poland and Portugal qualify from this group.
    - Group B: Georgia 0 – 2 Lithuania
    - Group B: Italy 3 – 1 Faroe Islands
    - Group B: Ukraine 2 – 2 France
      - Italy and France qualify from this group.
    - Group C: Turkey 1 – 0 Bosnia and Herzegovina
    - Group C: Malta 1 – 4 Norway
    - Group C: Hungary 1 – 2 Greece
      - Greece and Turkey qualify from this group.
    - Group D: Cyprus 0 – 2 Czech Republic
    - Group D: Germany 0 – 0 Wales
    - Group D: San Marino 0 – 5 Slovakia
      - Czech Republic and Germany qualify from this group.
    - Group E: Israel 1 – 0 Macedonia
    - Group E: Andorra 0 – 1 Russia
    - Group E: England 2 – 3 Croatia
      - Croatia and Russia qualify from this group.
    - Group F: Spain 1 – 0 Northern Ireland
    - Group F: Denmark 3 – 0 Iceland
    - Group F: Sweden 2 – 1 Latvia
      - Spain and Sweden qualify from this group.
    - Group G: Slovenia 0 – 2 Bulgaria
    - Group G: Belarus 2 – 1 Netherlands
    - Group G: Romania 6 – 1 Albania
      - Romania and the Netherlands qualify from this group.
  - 2008 OFC Cup of Nations
    - New Zealand 4 – 1 Vanuatu
    - New Caledonia 4 – 0 Fiji
  - 2010 World Cup qualifying, CONMEBOL, Round 4
    - Ecuador 5 – 1 Peru
    - Brazil 2 – 1 Uruguay
    - Chile 0 – 3 Paraguay

== 20 November 2007 (Tuesday) ==
- Football (soccer):
  - 2010 World Cup qualifying, CONMEBOL, Round 4
    - Venezuela 5 – 3 Bolivia
    - Colombia 2 – 1 Argentina
- Cricket
  - Sri Lankan cricket team in Australia in 2007–08
    - Australia 524/5 (dec) & 210/2 (dec) beat Sri Lanka 246 & 410 by 96 runs
- Major League Baseball postseason awards:
  - Jimmy Rollins of the Philadelphia Phillies holds off a strong field, including Matt Holliday (Colorado Rockies) and Prince Fielder (Milwaukee Brewers), to be named National League MVP. (MLB.com)
- American college basketball (AP rankings in parentheses):
  - (1) North Carolina 110, South Carolina State 64
  - (2) UCLA 68, (10) Michigan State 63
  - (3) Memphis 84, Arkansas State 63
  - (7) Tennessee 109, Middle Tennessee 40
  - (8) Indiana 95, UNC Wilmington 71
  - Saint Mary's 99, (12) Oregon 87

== 19 November 2007 (Monday) ==
- Major League Baseball postseason awards:
  - Alex Rodriguez of the New York Yankees is the overwhelming choice for American League MVP, earning 26 of a possible 28 first-place votes. (AP via ESPN.com)
- American football
  - National Football League Week 11:
    - Denver Broncos 34, Tennessee Titans 20
  - Michael Vick surrenders to U.S. marshals to begin serving his sentence on federal charges relating to his operation of a dog fighting ring. He will be formally sentenced on December 10. (AP via ESPN.com)
- American college basketball (AP rankings in parentheses):
  - (2) UCLA 71, Maryland 59
  - (10) Michigan State 86, Missouri 83

== 18 November 2007 (Sunday) ==
- American football
  - National Football League Week 11:
    - Indianapolis Colts 13, Kansas City Chiefs 10
      - Colts kicker Adam Vinatieri, who missed a chip-shot field goal that would have won last week's game, misses two more attempts in the first half but redeems himself with a 24-yarder with seconds left to beat Kansas City.
    - Jacksonville Jaguars 24, San Diego Chargers 17
      - Reggie Nelson and Sammy Knight come up with fourth-quarter interceptions for Jacksonville, while quarterback David Garrard, returning from an ankle injury, throws two touchdowns.
    - New York Giants 16, Detroit Lions 10
      - The Lions defense comes up with two late interceptions to seal the win; New York linebacker Mathias Kiwanuka breaks his leg on the second play of the game.
    - Green Bay Packers 31, Carolina Panthers 17
      - Brett Favre throws three more touchdown passes.
    - Tampa Bay Buccaneers 31, Atlanta Falcons 7
      - Byron Leftwich plays poorly in his return from an injury and is benched in favor of Joey Harrington.
    - Arizona Cardinals 35, Cincinnati Bengals 27
      - Arizona cornerback Antrel Rolle returns two Carson Palmer interceptions for touchdowns; a third pick-six is called back due a penalty on the return but nonetheless squelches Cincinnati's comeback attempt.
    - Philadelphia Eagles 17, Miami Dolphins 7
      - A switch to rookie John Beck at quarterback fails to spark the Dolphins, who fall to 0–10.
    - Minnesota Vikings 29, Oakland Raiders 22
      - With star rookie Adrian Peterson sidelined due to injury, replacement running back Chester Taylor rushes for 164 yards and three touchdowns for Minnesota.
    - Houston Texans 23, New Orleans Saints 10
      - In a game billed as the matchup of Reggie Bush and Mario Williams, Williams and the Texans defense carry the day.
    - Cleveland Browns 33, Baltimore Ravens 30 (OT)
      - The Ravens head to the locker room thinking they won the game, 30–27, after Phil Dawson's 51-yard field-goal attempt appears to hit the crossbar and fall short. But the officials reverse their call, saying the ball actually hit the support bar behind the uprights and bounced back onto the field. Dawson then hits a 33-yarder in overtime.
    - New York Jets 19, Pittsburgh Steelers 16 (OT)
    - Dallas Cowboys 28, Washington Redskins 23
    - St. Louis Rams 13, San Francisco 49ers 9
    - Seattle Seahawks 30, Chicago Bears 23
    - New England Patriots 56, Buffalo Bills 10
- American college basketball (AP rankings in parentheses):
  - (1) North Carolina 107, Iona 72
  - (6) Louisville 84, Jackson State 53
  - (8) Indiana 100, Longwood 49
  - New Orleans 65, (21) NC State 63
- Auto racing:
  - V8 Supercar: Tasmania Challenge, at Symmons Plains Raceway, Launceston, Australia:
  (1) Jamie Whincup (Australia) (2) Steve Richards (New Zealand) (3) Mark Winterbottom (Australia)
  The round victory for Jamie Whincup gets his title challenge back on track, with Garth Tander breaking his steering in Race 3, Tander loses his championship lead to Whincup with one round to go.
  - WTCC: Guia Race, at Macau Street Circuit, Macau:
  Race 1(1) Alain Menu (Switzerland) (2) Gabriele Tarquini (Italy) (3) Robert Huff (United Kingdom)
  Race 2(1) Andy Priaulx (United Kingdom) (2) Nicola Larini (Italy) (3) James Thompson (United Kingdom)
  The race two victory was enough for Andy Priaulx to claim his third successive World Championship, while title rival Yvan Muller scored no points for the weekend, losing the title 92–81. A race 2 podium saw James Thompson take third in the title, two points behind Muller.
  - NASCAR: Ford 400 at Homestead, Florida:
  (1) Matt Kenseth (2) Kurt Busch (3) Denny Hamlin
  Jimmie Johnson finishes seventh to secure his second consecutive NASCAR title.
- Canadian football:
  - Canadian Football League division finals:
    - Canadian Football League East Division final: Toronto Argonauts 9 at Winnipeg Blue Bombers 19 – the Bombers join their university counterparts in their trip to Toronto on Keith Stokes' 81-yard touchdown on a punt return. However, they will have to try to win the Grey Cup without starting quarterback Kevin Glenn, who was injured in the game. Backup quarterback Ryan Dinwiddie will start in Toronto.
    - Canadian Football League West Division final: Saskatchewan Roughriders 26 at British Columbia Lions 17 – Saskatchewan scores 16 points on four BC turnovers as well as four Luca Congi field goals to secure their trip to Toronto, where they will play against their Labour Day rivals. They avenge their humiliating 45–18 loss from last year. The Green Riders make their first Grey Cup final since 1997 – when it was held in Toronto.
- Football (soccer):
  - UEFA Euro 2008 qualifying:
    - Group A: Serbia vs Kazakhstan
      - The match rescheduled from yesterday is postponed again, to 24 November. Snow started falling in Belgrade about an hour before yesterdays' scheduled kick-off and there is no let-up predicted for at least 24 hours. Serbia are due to play Poland at home on 21 November, followed by the rescheduled Kazakhstan match next weekend, and need to win both to have a chance of reaching next summers' finals. (UEFA)
  - 2010 World Cup qualifying, AFC, Second Round, second leg
    (teams in bold qualified to 3rd round)
    - **Turkmenistan** 3 – 0 Hong Kong
    - **Syria** 7 – 0 Indonesia
    - Tajikistan 1 – 1 **Singapore**
    - **Thailand** 1 – 0 Yemen
  - 2010 World Cup qualifying, CONMEBOL, Round 3
    - Uruguay 2 – 2 Chile
    - Peru 1 – 1 Brazil
  - MLS Cup 2007, at RFK Stadium, Washington, D.C.
    - New England Revolution 1 – 2 Houston Dynamo
      - The Houston Dynamo become the second ever repeat champions in Major League Soccer history.
- Cricket
  - Pakistan cricket team in India in 2007–08
    - 5th ODI:Pakistan 306/6 (50 overs) beat India 275 (49.5 overs) by 31 runs
  - New Zealand cricket team in South Africa in 2007–08
    - 2nd Test:South Africa 383 beat New Zealand 188 & 136 by an innings and 59 runs

== 17 November 2007 (Saturday) ==
- American football
  - NCAA Division I FBS BCS Top 25:
    - (1) LSU 41, Ole Miss 24
    - (3) Kansas 45, Iowa State 7
    - Texas Tech 34, (4) Oklahoma 27
      - Sooners quarterback Sam Bradford leaves the game with an apparent concussion in the first quarter as Graham Harrell leads the Red Raiders to an upset that throws the Big 12 South race into chaos.
    - (5) Missouri 49, Kansas State 32
    - (6) West Virginia 28, (22) Cincinnati 23
    - (7) Ohio State 14, (21) Michigan 3
      - The Buckeyes win the Big Ten title behind 220 yards from running back Chris Wells and a defense that holds Michigan to 95 yards and seven first downs.
      - Michigan head coach Lloyd Carr is expected to announce his retirement on Monday.
    - (9) Georgia 24, (23) Kentucky 13
    - (10) Virginia Tech 44, Miami (FL) 14
    - (12) Florida 59, Florida Atlantic 20
      - Gators quarterback Tim Tebow becomes the first player in Division I-A/FBS history with at least 20 touchdowns in both rushing and passing in the same season.
    - (17) Boston College 20, (15) Clemson 17
      - The Eagles advance to the ACC Championship Game thanks to Matt Ryan's late 43-yard touchdown pass to Rich Gunnell.
    - (18) Boise State 58, Idaho 14
    - (19) Illinois 41, Northwestern 22 (Sweet Sioux Tomahawk)
    - (20) Tennessee 25, Vanderbilt 24
      - The Volunteers score 16 unanswered points in the fourth quarter to take the lead, then Vandy kicker Bryant Hahnfeldt's would-be game-winning 49-yard field goal hits the upright.
    - (24) Connecticut 30, Syracuse 7
    - (25) Wisconsin 41, Minnesota 34 (Paul Bunyan's Axe)
- Canadian football
  - Canadian Interuniversity Sport national semifinals (CIS Top 10 rankings in parentheses)
    - Uteck Bowl: (1) Laval Rouge-et-Or 2 at (4) Saint Mary's Huskies 24 – In the battle of the winners of five of the last six Vanier Cups, the hometown Huskies, in front of an Atlantic Bowl crowd at Huskies Stadium, shock the number one ranked team in the nation and the number two ranked offense in the nation, ending Laval's winning streak at 14 games. Linebacker Tim St. Pierre is the game's MVP, having two sacks, one forced fumble, and one touchdown in the Huskies' rout, as they avenge their only loss of the season to Laval back in October.
    - Mitchell Bowl: (10) Western Ontario Mustangs 20 at (3) Manitoba Bisons 52 – The undefeated Herd scores 24 unanswered points in the second quarter, rout the Mustangs and advance to meet the Huskies for the first time since 2001, when they met the same opponent that they will meet this year. However, the Bisons did allow a touchdown in the third quarter, ending their run of 245:28 (just over four games) without allowing a touchdown. The Bisons also break their school record for the most points scored in the game, the previous mark having been set the previous week against the Rams.
- Figure skating
  - Tiffany Vise and Derek Trent make history by landing the first throw quadruple salchow jump in international competition. This is the first throw quadruple jump in pair skating.
- Football (soccer):
  - UEFA Euro 2008 qualifying:
    - Group A: Finland 2 – 1 Azerbaijan
    - Group A: Poland 2 – 0 Belgium
    - Group A: Serbia vs Kazakhstan
      - Match postponed due to snow on the pitch. The match will be played at 1400 CET tomorrow.
    - Group A: Portugal 1 – 0 Armenia
      - Poland qualify from the group. Portugal need a draw against Finland next Wednesday to qualify, while Finland must win to qualify.
    - Group B: Scotland 1 – 2 Italy
    - Group B: Lithuania 2 – 0 Ukraine
      - Heartbreak for Scotland as a 91st-minute goal by Christian Panucci means that Italy and France will qualify from this group.
    - Group C: Moldova 3 – 0 Hungary
    - Group C: Norway 1 – 2 Turkey
    - Group C: Greece 5 – 0 Malta
      - Turkey move one point ahead of Norway in 2nd place. Greece has already qualified.
    - Group D: Wales 2 – 2 Republic of Ireland
    - Group D: Germany 4 – 0 Cyprus
    - Group D: Czech Republic 3 – 1 Slovakia
      - Germany and the Czech Republic have already qualified from this group.
    - Group E: Andorra 0 – 2 Estonia
    - Group E: Israel 2 – 1 Russia
    - Group E: Macedonia 2 – 0 Croatia
      - Russia lose out to a 91st-minute goal by Omer Golan which means that Croatia has qualified and England will only need to draw with Croatia next Wednesday at Wembley in order to qualify.
    - Group F: Latvia 4 – 1 Liechtenstein
    - Group F: Northern Ireland 2 – 1 Denmark
    - Group F: Spain 3 – 0 Sweden
      - Spain qualify, while Sweden still need at least a draw against Latvia next Wednesday to qualify. Northern Ireland must defeat Spain, and Latvia defeat Sweden, in which case Northern Ireland will qualify in Sweden's place.
    - Group G: Bulgaria 1 – 0 Romania
    - Group G: Albania 2 – 4 Belarus
    - Group G: Netherlands 1 – 0 Luxembourg
      - Netherlands qualify and join Romania, who qualified earlier.
  - 2010 World Cup qualifying, CAF, preliminary round
    - Comoros 0 – 4 Madagascar
    - Guinea-Bissau 0 – 0 Sierra Leone
  - 2008 OFC Cup of Nations
    - Vanuatu 1 – 2 New Zealand
    - Fiji 3 – 3 New Caledonia
  - 2010 World Cup qualifying, CONMEBOL, Round 3
    - Argentina 3 – 0 Bolivia
    - Colombia 1 – 0 Venezuela
    - Paraguay 5 – 1 Ecuador
- American college basketball (AP rankings in parentheses):
  - (6) Louisville 104, Hartford 69
  - Virginia 75, (17) Arizona 72
  - Siena 79, (20) Stanford 67

== 16 November 2007 (Friday) ==
- American football
  - NCAA Division I FBS BCS Top 25:
    - (16) Hawaiʻi 28, Nevada 26
- American college basketball (AP rankings in parentheses):
  - (3) Memphis 81, Connecticut 70
  - (7) Tennessee 89, Prairie View 75
  - (9) Washington State 74, Idaho 43
  - Providence 67, (18) Arkansas 51
- Football (soccer):
  - 2010 World Cup qualifying, CAF, preliminary round
    - Djibouti 1–0 Somalia. Djibouti advances to Round 1.

== 15 November 2007 (Thursday) ==
- American football
  - NCAA Division I FBS AP Top 25:
    - Arizona 34, (2) Oregon 24
      - The Ducks lose Heisman Trophy candidate Dennis Dixon to a knee injury in the first quarter, and go on to lose their national title hopes in Tucson.
- American college basketball (AP rankings in parentheses):
  - (3) Memphis 63, Oklahoma 53
  - (4) Kansas 92, Washburn 60
  - (5) Georgetown 74, Michigan 52
- Cricket:
  - Pakistan cricket team in India in 2007–08
    - India 260/4 beat Pakistan 255/6 (50 ov.) by 6 wickets
      - Take lead in the five ODI series by (3–1)
- Major League Baseball:
  - Federal prosecutors in San Francisco unseal an indictment of Barry Bonds for perjury and obstruction of justice. He is charged with lying to a federal grand jury that he did not knowingly use performance-enhancing drugs. (AP via ESPN.com)
  - Jake Peavy of the San Diego Padres, winner of the pitcher's Triple Crown in the National League, is unanimously chosen as the league's Cy Young Award winner.
  - Alex Rodriguez decides to stay with the New York Yankees, agreeing in principle to a new 10-year contract worth a reported $275 million. The contract, expected to be drafted and signed in the next few days, is likely to include millions more should he break Bonds' career home run record while with the Yankees. (AP via ESPN.com)

== 14 November 2007 (Wednesday) ==
- Major League Baseball postseason awards:
  - Bob Melvin of the Arizona Diamondbacks (National League) and Eric Wedge of the Cleveland Indians (American League) win the Manager of the Year award for their respective leagues, as awarded by the Baseball Writers' Association of America.
- American college basketball:
  - The Gazelle Group, a Princeton, New Jersey company that operates two major season-opening tournaments, announces that it will launch a new NCAA Division I postseason tournament in March 2008 to be called the College Basketball Invitational. The CBI is intended to compete with the National Invitation Tournament for teams that did not make the NCAA tournament. (AP via ESPN.com)
  - Scores (rankings from AP Poll):
    - (1) North Carolina 72, Davidson 68
    - (7) Tennessee 101, Arkansas-Monticello 44
- National Football League:
  - The league reinstates Ricky Williams after an 18-month suspension due to violation of the league's substance abuse policy. (ESPN.com)
  - The Indianapolis Colts suffer a major blow when star defensive end Dwight Freeney is confirmed to have suffered a Lisfranc fracture of his left foot, which ends his season. (ESPN.com)

== 13 November 2007 (Tuesday) ==
- Major League Baseball postseason awards:
  - CC Sabathia of the Cleveland Indians wins the Cy Young Award in the American League.
- National Football League:
  - Suspended Tennessee Titans cornerback Pacman Jones is reportedly set to accept a plea deal which will see him plead guilty to a misdemeanor and receive one year probation in exchange for testimony regarding a shooting at a Las Vegas strip club. (AP via ESPN.com)
- American college basketball (AP rankings):
  - (2) UCLA 76, Cal State-San Bernardino 41
  - (9) Washington State 86, Boise State 74

== 12 November 2007 (Monday) ==
- American football
  - National Football League Week 10:
    - Seattle Seahawks 24, San Francisco 49ers 0
- American college basketball (AP rankings):
  - (2) UCLA 83, Youngstown State 52
  - (8) Indiana 99, Chattanooga 79
  - (10) Marquette 66, Utah Valley 55
- Cricket
  - Sri Lankan cricket team in Australia in 2007–08
    - Australia 551/4 (dec) beat Sri Lanka 211 & 300 by an innings & 40 runs
- Major League Baseball: Postseason awards
  - Rookies of the Year: American League — Dustin Pedroia, Boston Red Sox; National League — Ryan Braun, Milwaukee Brewers

== 11 November 2007 (Sunday) ==
- American football
  - National Football League Week 10:
    - Denver Broncos 27, Kansas City Chiefs 11
      - The Broncos score two touchdowns in 9 seconds to help lead themselves to a victory.
    - Philadelphia Eagles 33, Washington Redskins 25
    - Jacksonville Jaguars 28, Tennessee Titans 13
    - Pittsburgh Steelers 31, Cleveland Browns 28
      - Ben Roethlisberger throws for two touchdowns and runs for another to lead the Steelers back from a 21–6 deficit.
    - St. Louis Rams 37, New Orleans Saints 29
    - Buffalo Bills 13, Miami Dolphins 10
    - Green Bay Packers 34, Minnesota Vikings 0
      - Brett Favre throws for 351 yards and three TDs, in the process joining Dan Marino as the only quarterbacks to throw for 60,000 yards in their NFL careers. In the meantime, the Pack's defense holds Adrian Peterson to 45 yards.
    - Atlanta Falcons 20, Carolina Panthers 13
    - Cincinnati Bengals 21, Baltimore Ravens 7
    - Arizona Cardinals 31, Detroit Lions 21
      - The Cardinals hold the Lions to minus-18 rushing yards.
    - Dallas Cowboys 31, New York Giants 20
      - Tony Romo throws four touchdown passes as the Cowboys move to 8–1.
    - Chicago Bears 17, Oakland Raiders 6
    - San Diego Chargers 23, Indianapolis Colts 21
      - Darren Sproles returns a kickoff and a punt for Chargers touchdowns, and Peyton Manning throws six interceptions. But Indianapolis still has a chance to win in the final two minutes, until Adam Vinatieri misses a 29-yard field goal.
- American college basketball (AP rankings):
  - (4) Kansas 85, UMKC 62
- Auto racing:
  - NASCAR: Checker Auto Parts 500 at Avondale, Arizona:
  (1) Jimmie Johnson (2) Greg Biffle (3) Matt Kenseth

Johnson wins his fourth straight race, becoming the first driver to do so in the Cup since current teammate Jeff Gordon in 1998, and virtually clinches the NASCAR title. He only has to finish 18th or better in the series finale at Homestead next week to win the title.

- Canadian football
  - Canadian Football League division semifinals:
    - Canadian Football League East Division semifinals: Montreal Alouettes 22 at Winnipeg Blue Bombers 24 – Kicker Troy Westwood kicks the game-winning field goal as time expires. The Blue Bombers will face the Toronto Argonauts in the East final next week in Toronto.
    - Canadian Football League West Division final: Calgary Stampeders 24 at Saskatchewan Roughriders 26 – In the first playoff game in Regina in 19 years, Kerry Joseph passes for 395 yards and rushes for 108, and Luca Congi kicks six field goals to lead the Green Riders into the West final next week in Vancouver.
- Pocket billiards (pool): World 9-ball Championship at Quezon City, Philippines
  - Final: (17) Daryl Peach (England) 17–15 (Philippines) Roberto Gomez
- Cricket:
  - New Zealand cricket team in South Africa in 2007–08
    - South Africa 226 & 422/3 (dec) beat New Zealand 118 & 172 by 358 runs
  - Pakistan cricket team in India in 2007–08
    - India 294/6 (50 ov.) beat Pakistan 248 (47.2 ov.) by 46 runs

== 10 November 2007 (Saturday) ==
- American football
  - NCAA Division I FBS AP Top 25:
    - Illinois 28, (1) Ohio State 21
      - Illini quarterback Juice Williams throws for four touchdown in Illinois' first win over a No. 1-ranked team since 1956.
    - (2) LSU 58, Louisiana Tech 10
    - (4) Kansas 43, Oklahoma State 28
      - The Jayhawks go to 10–0 for the first time since '99... 1899.
    - (5) Oklahoma 52, Baylor 21
    - (6) Missouri 40, Texas A&M 26
    - Maryland 42, (8) Boston College 35
    - (9) Arizona State 24, UCLA 20
    - (10) Georgia 45, (18) Auburn 20
    - (11) Virginia Tech 40, Florida State 21
    - Wisconsin 37, (12) Michigan 21
    - Cincinnati 27, (13) Connecticut 3
    - (14) Texas 59, Texas Tech 43
    - (15) Florida 51, South Carolina 31
    - (16) Hawaiʻi 37, Fresno State 30
    - (17) USC 24, California 17
    - (19) Virginia 48, Miami (FL) 0
      - The Cavaliers humiliate the Hurricanes in their last game at the Orange Bowl.
    - (20) Boise State 52, Utah State 0
    - (21) Clemson 44, Wake Forest 10
    - Mississippi State 17, (22) Alabama 12
    - (23) Penn State 31, Temple 0
    - (24) Tennessee 34, Arkansas 13
    - (25) Kentucky 27, Vanderbilt 20
  - Other significant games:
    - Navy 74, North Texas 62 — The highest-scoring regulation game in any NCAA football division since the NCAA began keeping official records in 1937.
- Canadian football:
  - Canadian Interuniversity Sport conference finals (CIS Top 10 rankings in parentheses):
    - Dunsmore Cup: (8) Concordia Stingers 10 at (1) Laval Rouge-et-Or 35 – The Rouge-et-Or capture their fifth straight Dunsmore Cup and continue their undefeated run that has extended since their loss to the Montreal Carabins in the final game of the 2006 season.
    - Loney Bowl: St. FX X-Men 24 at (4) Saint Mary's Huskies 25 – The Huskies sealed the game on a third-and-one play by Loney Trophy winner Erik Glavin, and will play host to the Rouge-et-Or in the Uteck Bowl.
    - Yates Cup: (10) Western Ontario Mustangs 34 at Guelph Gryphons 21 – Mustangs head coach Greg Marshall wins his 15th Yates Cup (3rd as a coach) en route to the victory as Western scores two touchdowns and two field goals in the second half.
    - Hardy Trophy: (6) Regina Rams 5 at (3) Manitoba Bisons 48 – The Herd capitalizes on six Regina turnovers and come back from a 5–0 deficit to win the game, limiting the Rams to only 19 total yards in the second quarter. They will host the Mitchell Bowl against the Mustangs – their second in 34 years but their first since 2001. The Bisons have now not allowed a touchdown in 210:37 – well over three and a half games.
- American college basketball (AP rankings):
  - (5) Georgetown 68, William & Mary 53
  - Mercer 96, (18) USC 81
    - The Bears spoil O. J. Mayo's regular-season debut, even though the highly touted freshman scores 32.
- Football (soccer):
  - 2010 World Cup qualifying, AFC, Second Round, first leg
    - Hong Kong 0–0 Turkmenistan
  - MLS Cup 2007 – Conference Finals
    - Western Conference: Kansas City Wizards 0–2 Houston Dynamo. Houston advances to the MLS Cup.
- Horse racing:
  - The English flat racing season ends with jockeys Seb Sanders and Jamie Spencer tying for the Jockeys' Championship, with 190 victories each, with Spencer winning the last race of the season. The championship has only previously been tied in 1871 and 1923. (BBC)
- Pocket billiards (pool): World 9-ball Championship at Quezon City, Philippines
  - Quarterfinals:
    - (9) Francisco Bustamante (Philippines) 9–11 (England) Daryl Peach (17)
      - Bustamante's foul on the 19th rack with him leading 10–9 gave the match away to Peach.
    - (12) Mika Immonen (Finland) 7–11 (Hungary) Vilmos Földes
    - Joven Bustamante (Philippines) 8–11 (England) Karl Boyes
    - Kuo Po-cheng (Chinese Taipei) 4–11 (Philippines) Roberto Gomez
  - Semifinals:
    - (17) Daryl Peach (England) 11–2 (Hungary) Vilmos Földes
    - Karl Boyes (England) 4–11 (Philippines) Roberto Gomez

== 9 November 2007 (Friday) ==
- Football (soccer):
  - 2010 World Cup qualifying, AFC, Second Round, first leg
    - Indonesia 1–4 Syria
    - Singapore 2–0 Tajikistan
    - Yemen 1–1 Thailand
- Pocket billiards (pool): World 9-ball Championship at Quezon City, Philippines last 16 matches:
  - (17) Daryl Peach (England) 11–5 (Germany) Harald Stolka
  - (9) Francisco Bustamante (Philippines) 11–2 (Philippines) Alex Pagulayan (8)
  - (12) Mika Immonen (Finland) 11–8 (Canada) Alain Martel
  - Vilmos Földes (Hungary) 11–5 (Chinese Taipei) Lu Hui-tan
  - Satoshi Kawabata (Japan) 9–11 (Philippines) Joven Bustamante
  - (11) Konstantin Stepanov (Russia) 4–11 (England) Karl Boyes
  - Kuo Po-cheng (Chinese Taipei) 11–7 (United States) Corey Deuel (24)
  - (16) Niels Feijen (Netherlands) 0–11 (Philippines) Roberto Gomez
- American college basketball (AP rankings):
  - (2) UCLA 69, Portland State 48
  - (4) Kansas 107, Louisiana-Monroe 78
  - (7) Tennessee 80, Temple 63
  - (10) Washington State 68, Eastern Washington 41

== 8 November 2007 (Thursday) ==
- American football
  - NCAA Division I FBS AP Top 25:
    - (7) West Virginia 38, Louisville 31
- Football (soccer):
  - MLS Cup 2007 – Conference Finals
    - Eastern Conference: Chicago Fire 0–1 New England Revolution. New England advances to MLS Cup.
- Pocket billiards (pool): World 9-ball Championship at Quezon City, Philippines last 32 selected matches:
  - (13) Shane Van Boening (United States) 8–10 (Hungary) Vilmos Földes
  - (30) Lương Chí Dũng (Vietnam) 3–10 (Japan) Satoshi Kawabata
  - (3) Wu Jia-qing (Chinese Taipei) 8–10 (Philippines) Joven Bustamante
  - (7) Chang Jung-lin (Chinese Taipei) 9–10 (United States) Corey Deuel (24)
  - (2) Ralf Souquet (Germany) 2–10 (Netherlands) Niels Feijen (16)
  - (18) Chao Fong-pang (Chinese Taipei) 2–10 (Philippines) Roberto Gomez
- Cricket
  - Pakistan cricket team in India in 2007–08
    - 2nd ODI-Pakistan 322/6 (49.5 ov.) beat India 321/9 (50 ov.) by 4 wickets

== 7 November 2007 (Wednesday) ==
- Pocket billiards (pool): World 9-ball Championship at Quezon City, Philippines last 64 selected matches:
  - (1) Ronato Alcano (Philippines) 6–10 (England) Daryl Peach (17)
  - (4) Yang Ching-shun (Chinese Taipei) 3–10 (Japan) Satoshi Kawabata
  - (6) Efren Reyes (Philippines) 5–10 (Russia) Konstantin Stepanov (11)
  - (21) Lee Vann Corteza (Philippines) 7–10 (Philippines) Jeff de Luna
- American college basketball (rankings from AP Poll):
  - Gardner–Webb 84, (20) Kentucky 68
    - The honeymoon is officially over for new Wildcats coach Billy Gillispie, as the Runnin' Bulldogs, picked to finish eighth in the Atlantic Sun Conference, jump to a 14–0 lead in Lexington and never trail.
- Major League Baseball:
  - The agent for pitching great Roger Clemens told the Houston Astros that Clemens was set to begin a personal-services contract with the team, the strongest indication yet that Clemens would retire. However, Clemens has made no official announcement of his playing future. (ESPN.com)

UEFA Champions league First phase FC Barcelona vs Rangers 2–0

== 6 November 2007 (Tuesday) ==
- American college basketball (rankings from AP Poll):
  - (3) Memphis 80, Richmond 63

== 5 November 2007 (Monday) ==
- Cricket
  - Pakistan cricket team in India in 2007–08
    - India 242/5 (47 ov.) beat Pakistan 237/7 (50 ov.) by 5 wickets.
- American football
  - National Football League Week 9:
    - Pittsburgh Steelers 38, Baltimore Ravens 7
- American college basketball (rankings from AP Poll):
  - (3) Memphis 102, UT-Martin 71

== 4 November 2007 (Sunday) ==
- American football
  - National Football League Week 9:
    - Atlanta Falcons 20, San Francisco 49ers 16
    - Buffalo Bills 33, Cincinnati Bengals 21
    - Detroit Lions 44, Denver Broncos 7
    - Green Bay Packers 33, Kansas City Chiefs 22
    - Minnesota Vikings 35, San Diego Chargers 17
      - The Vikings' Adrian Peterson sets an NFL record with 296 rushing yards, breaking the record set by Jamal Lewis in 2003. Peterson also becomes the first player ever with two 200-yard rushing games in his rookie season. The Chargers' Antonio Cromartie also sets an NFL record, returning a failed field goal attempt 109 yards for a touchdown as the first half ends.
    - New Orleans Saints 41, Jacksonville Jaguars 24
    - Tennessee Titans 20, Carolina Panthers 7
    - Tampa Bay Buccaneers 17, Arizona Cardinals 10
    - Washington Redskins 23, New York Jets 20 (OT)
    - Houston Texans 24, Oakland Raiders 17
    - New England Patriots 24, Indianapolis Colts 20
      - The Pats stay unbeaten after two TD passes from Tom Brady bring them back from a 20–10 fourth-quarter deficit in Indy.
    - Cleveland Browns 33, Seattle Seahawks 30 (OT)
    - Dallas Cowboys 38, Philadelphia Eagles 17
    - Byes: Chicago Bears, Miami Dolphins, New York Giants, St. Louis Rams
- Auto racing:
  - NASCAR: Dickies 500 at Fort Worth, Texas:
  (1) Jimmie Johnson (2) Matt Kenseth (3) Martin Truex Jr.

Johnson takes the lead in the Chase over teammate Jeff Gordon.

== 3 November 2007 (Saturday) ==
- American football
  - NCAA Division I FBS AP Top 25:
    - (1) Ohio State 38, Wisconsin 17
    - Florida State 27, (2) Boston College 17
    - (3) LSU 41, (17) Alabama 34
    - (4) Oregon 35, (6) Arizona State 23
    - (5) Oklahoma 42, Texas A&M 14
    - (8) Kansas 76, Nebraska 39
      - The surprising Jayhawks torch the Huskers for the most points they have ever allowed in a single game, and send them to their first five-game losing streak since 1958.
    - (9) Missouri 55, Colorado 10
    - (10) Georgia 44, Troy 34
    - (13) USC 24, Oregon State 3
    - (14) Texas 38, Oklahoma State 35
    - (15) Michigan 28, Michigan State 24 (Paul Bunyan Trophy)
    - (16) Connecticut 38, Rutgers 19
      - The Huskies go to 8–1 for the first time in school history.
    - (18) Florida 49, Vanderbilt 22
    - (19) Auburn 35, Tennessee Tech 3
    - Cincinnati 38, (20) South Florida 33
    - Virginia 17, (21) Wake Forest 16
    - (22) Boise State 42, San Jose State 7
    - Arkansas 48, (23) South Carolina 36
    - (24) Tennessee 59, UL-Lafayette 7
    - (25) Clemson 47, Duke 10
  - Other significant games:
    - Navy 46, Notre Dame 44 (3 OT) — The Midshipmen beat the Irish for the first time since 1963, ending what had been a 43-game winning streak for the Irish, the longest between two annual opponents in Division I history.
- Auto racing:
  - V8 Supercar: Desert 400, at Bahrain International Circuit, Manama, Bahrain:
  (1) Mark Winterbottom (Australia) (2) James Courtney (Australia) (3) Steven Johnson (Australia)
  Winterbottom wins his first round of the year, but a disaster for series leader Jamie Whincup scoring no points for the round, dropping to third behind Garth Tander and teammate Craig Lowndes.
- Football (soccer):
  - MLS Cup 2007 – Conference Semifinals, second leg
    - New England Revolution 1, New York Red Bulls 0. New England wins 1–0 on aggregate.
    - Kansas City Wizards 0, C.D. Chivas USA 0. Kansas City wins 1–0 on aggregate.

== 2 November 2007 (Friday) ==
- Auto racing:
  - V8 Supercar: Desert 400, Race 1, at Bahrain International Circuit, Manama, Bahrain:
  (1) Mark Winterbottom (Australia) (2) Garth Tander (Australia) (3) Steven Johnson (Australia)
  Championship leader Jamie Whincup is taken out of the race in an incident involving teammate Craig Lowndes and Paul Morris. Tander has regained the series lead.
- Basketball:
  - 2007–08 NBA season – Season Openers
    - Charlotte Bobcats 102, Milwaukee Bucks 99
    - Atlanta Hawks 101, Dallas Mavericks 94
    - Cleveland Cavaliers 110, New York Knicks 106
    - Boston Celtics 103, Washington Wizards 83
    - Denver Nuggets 99, Minnesota Timberwolves 91
    - Los Angeles Clippers 120, Golden State Warriors 114
    - Other NBA news: Clay Bennett, the principal owner of the Seattle SuperSonics, notifies the league that he intends to move the team to Oklahoma City as early as the 2008–09 season. He is currently in litigation to void the team's lease at KeyArena, which runs through the 2009–10 season. (AP via ESPN.com)
- Football (soccer):
  - MLS Cup 2007 – Conference Semifinals, second leg
    - Houston Dynamo 4, FC Dallas 1 (extra time) Houston wins 4–2 on aggregate

== 1 November 2007 (Thursday) ==
- American football
  - NCAA Division I FBS AP Top 25:
    - (11) Virginia Tech 27, Georgia Tech 3
- Baseball:
  - 2007 Japan Series
    - Game 5: Chunichi Dragons 1, Hokkaido Nippon Ham Fighters 0. Dragons win series 4–1. Series MVP: Norihiro Nakamura, Dragons
  - Major League Baseball:
    - As expected, Joe Torre is hired as manager of the Los Angeles Dodgers, signing a three-year contract. (AP via ESPN.com)
- Basketball:
  - 2007–08 NBA season – Season Openers
    - Detroit Pistons 91, Miami Heat 80
    - Phoenix Suns 106, Seattle SuperSonics 99
- Football (soccer):
  - MLS Cup 2007 – Conference Semifinals, second leg
    - Chicago Fire 2–2 D.C. United. Chicago wins 3–2 on aggregate.
- Tennis:
  - Martina Hingis announces her second retirement from tennis, citing injury problems. She also admits to a positive "A" test for cocaine at Wimbledon this year, but denies having used the drug. (BBC)
