= December 2007 in sports =

<<	December 2007					>>
Su	Mo	Tu	We	Th	Fr	Sa
						1
2	3	4	5	6	7	8
9	10	11	12	13	14	15
16	17	18	19	20	21	22
23	24	25	26	27	28	29
30	31
Sports

This list shows notable sports-related deaths, events, and notable outcomes that occurred in December of 2007.

== Deaths ==
- 29: Phil O'Donnell
- 28: Aidin Nikkhah Bahrami
- 26: Stu Nahan
- 17: Don Chevrier
- 1: Ken McGregor

== Sporting seasons ==
- American football
  - NCAA Division I FBS
  - National Football League
- Auto racing 2007:
  - A1 Grand Prix
- Basketball 2007:
  - Australian National Basketball League
  - British Basketball League
  - EuroCup
  - Euroleague
  - National Basketball Association
  - Philippine Basketball Association
    - Philippine Cup
  - Russian Basketball Super League
  - Turkish Basketball League
  - ULEB Cup
- Cricket 2007:
  - England
- Football (soccer) 2007–08:
  - UEFA Champions League
  - UEFA Cup
  - England
  - Italy
  - Germany
  - Spain
  - France
  - Argentina
  - Denmark
- Golf 2008:
  - PGA Tour
  - European Tour
- Ice hockey 2007–08
  - National Hockey League
- Lacrosse 2008
  - National Lacrosse League
- Rugby union 2007–08:
  - IRB Sevens
  - Heineken Cup
  - English Premiership
  - Celtic League
  - Top 14

== 31 December 2007 (Monday) ==
- American football:
  - NCAA Division I FBS bowl games:
    - Armed Forces Bowl in Fort Worth: California 42, Air Force 36
      - The Golden Bears come back from a 21–0 second-quarter deficit.
    - Sun Bowl in El Paso: Oregon 56, South Florida 21
    - Humanitarian Bowl in Boise: Fresno State 40, Georgia Tech 28
    - Music City Bowl in Nashville: Kentucky 35, Florida State 28
      - It's déjà vu all over again for the Wildcats: For the second straight year, they travel to Nashville for this game, defeat an ACC team coached by a Bowden (last year, it was the Clemson team of son Tommy), see their quarterback André Woodson named game MVP, and finish 8–5. This gives the Cats back-to-back bowl wins for the first time in over 50 years.
    - Insight Bowl in Tempe, Arizona: Oklahoma State 49, Indiana 33
    - Chick-fil-A Bowl in Atlanta: Auburn 23, Clemson 20 (OT)
      - Auburn win in OT after scoring a touchdown, as opposed to Clemson's field goal.

== 30 December 2007 (Sunday) ==
- American football:
  - NCAA Division I FBS bowl games:
    - Independence Bowl in Shreveport, Louisiana: Alabama 30, Colorado 24
  - National Football League Week 16:
    - Cleveland Browns 20, San Francisco 49ers 7
      - Jamal Lewis rushes for 128 yards as the Browns finish the regular season 10–6.
    - Green Bay Packers 34, Detroit Lions 13
      - The 13–3 Packers overwhelm 7–9 Detroit despite resting several key players for all or part of the game.
    - Chicago Bears 33, New Orleans Saints 25
      - Devin Hester breaks his own single-season NFL record with his sixth return of a kick for a touchdown and also scores on a 55-yard pass play; the Saints are eliminated from playoff contention.
    - Houston Texans 42, Jacksonville Jaguars 28
      - Texans kick returner André Davis becomes the seventh player in league history to return two kickoffs for touchdowns in the same game, and Houston finishes with a .500 record for the first time.
    - Carolina Panthers 31, Tampa Bay Buccaneers 23
      - DeAngelo Williams scores two touchdowns and rushes for 121 yards; Vinny Testaverde, playing in his last game, enters on the final play to take a knee.
    - Philadelphia Eagles 17, Buffalo Bills 9
      - Donovan McNabb throws for 345 yards as the Eagles end their year with a three-game winning streak.
    - Cincinnati Bengals 38, Miami Dolphins 25
      - The Dolphins, who allow Carson Palmer 316 passing yards and three touchdowns, tie a league record with their 15th loss of the season. They also became the 8th team to finish a season at 1–15 after the Carolina Panthers in 2001
    - Atlanta Falcons 44, Seattle Seahawks 41
      - Chris Redman throws three touchdown passes in less than 2 minutes in the fourth quarter.
    - Denver Broncos 22, Minnesota Vikings 19 (OT)
      - Needing a win and a Redskins loss to make the playoffs, the Vikings get neither. Tarvaris Jackson leads a comeback in regulation, but his fumble leads to Jason Elam's overtime field goal.
    - Baltimore Ravens 27, Pittsburgh Steelers 21
      - Troy Smith wins his first NFL game against a Steelers team resting several starters.
    - Washington Redskins 27, Dallas Cowboys 6
      - The Redskins win their fourth-straight game to capture a playoff spot. The Cowboys are held to 1-yard rushing, their lowest total in franchise history.
    - New York Jets 13, Kansas City Chiefs 10 (OT)
      - The Chiefs end the year with nine straight losses.
    - San Diego Chargers 30, Oakland Raiders 17
      - The Chargers force four turnovers and clinch the No. 3 seed in the AFC playoffs.
    - Arizona Cardinals 48, St. Louis Rams 19
      - Larry Fitzgerald closes Arizona's best season since 1998 with an 11-reception, 171-yard performance.
    - Tennessee Titans 16, Indianapolis Colts 10
      - Kerry Collins takes over for an injured Vince Young in the third quarter and leads the Titans on three drives that end in Rob Bironas field goals, giving the Titans the final playoff berth.

== 29 December 2007 (Saturday) ==
- Cricket
  - Indian cricket team in Australia in 2007–08
    - 1st Test: Australia 343 (92.4 ov.) & 351/7 dec. (88 ov.) beat India 196 (71.5 ov.) & 161 (74 ov.) by 337 runs
  - West Indian cricket team in South Africa in 2007–08
    - 1st Test: West Indies 408 (133.4 ov.) & 175 (57.4 ov.) beat South Africa 195 (62.1 ov.) & 260 (74.5 ov.) by 128 runs
      - The Windies collect their first Test win ever in South Africa.
- American football:
  - NCAA Division I FBS bowl games:
    - Meineke Car Care Bowl in Charlotte: Wake Forest 24, Connecticut 10
    - Liberty Bowl in Memphis: Mississippi State 10, UCF 3
    - Alamo Bowl in San Antonio: Penn State 24, Texas A&M 17
  - National Football League Week 17:
    - New England Patriots 38, New York Giants 35
      - The Patriots come back from a 12-point deficit in the third quarter, their largest of the year, to become the first team to finish the regular season 16–0. Tom Brady connects with Randy Moss for two touchdown passes, giving Brady the NFL record for most TD passes in a season and Moss the record for most TD receptions in a season.
- Indoor Lacrosse – National Lacrosse League (Week 1):
  - Colorado Mammoth 10, Calgary Roughnecks 9
    - Opening Day

== 28 December 2007 (Friday) ==
- American football:
  - NCAA Division I FBS bowl games:
    - Champs Sports Bowl in Orlando: Boston College 24, Michigan State 21
    - Texas Bowl in Houston: TCU 20, Houston 13
    - Emerald Bowl in San Francisco: Oregon State 21, Maryland 14

== 27 December 2007 (Thursday) ==
- American football:
  - NCAA Division I FBS bowl games:
    - Holiday Bowl in San Diego: Texas 52, Arizona State 34
- Tennis:
  - The Women's Tennis Association reveals that Aboriginal Australian tennis player Evonne Goolagong briefly supplanted Chris Evert as Women's World Number 1 tennis player after the 1976 Virginia Slims at Los Angeles tournament, until May 10, when Evert retook the #1 ranking. She had originally been denied the ranking due to a calculation error.
  - The Association of Tennis Professionals (International Men's Pro Tour) reveals the results of an investigation beginning in August 2007 implicating two top Italian men's professional players, Potito Starace and Daniele Bracciali, in a match betting scandal. Starace, ranked 31st worldwide, was suspended from play for six weeks and fined US$30,000. Bracciali, ranked at 258th, was banned for three months and fined $20,000. Each claimed they were unaware of ATP regulations forbidding gambling.

== 26 December 2007 (Wednesday) ==
- American football:
  - NCAA Division I FBS bowl games
    - Motor City Bowl in Detroit: Purdue 51, Central Michigan 48

== 25 December 2007 (Tuesday) ==
- Basketball – National Basketball Association Christmas Day games:
  - Cleveland Cavaliers 96, Miami Heat 82
  - Portland Trail Blazers 89, Seattle SuperSonics 79
  - Los Angeles Lakers 122, Phoenix Suns 115
    - All home teams win their games.

== 24 December 2007 (Monday) ==
- American football:
  - National Football League Week 16:
    - San Diego Chargers 23, Denver Broncos 3
- Basketball: National Basketball Association
  - Scott Skiles is fired as head coach of the Chicago Bulls after a 9–16 start. Although the Bulls had recovered from worse starts to earn playoff spots in two of the previous three seasons under Skiles, the Bulls management decided it was time for a change.

== 23 December 2007 (Sunday) ==
- American football:
  - NCAA Division I FBS bowl games:
    - Hawaiʻi Bowl in Honolulu: East Carolina 41, Boise State 38
  - National Football League Week 16:
    - New York Giants 38, Buffalo Bills 21
      - The Giants rush for 291 yards and clinch a wild-card berth. Before the game, Bills tight end Kevin Everett, who suffered a career-ending spinal cord injury earlier in the season, visited his teammates' locker room, walking in under his own power.
    - Chicago Bears 35, Green Bay Packers 7
      - The Packers, who botch four punts on a wintry day, lose any chance of winning the top seed in the NFL playoffs.
    - Cincinnati Bengals 19, Cleveland Browns 14
      - Derek Anderson throws four interceptions; the Browns' playoff hopes now ride on an Indianapolis win over Tennessee next week.
    - Detroit Lions 25, Kansas City Chiefs 20
      - The Lions end a six-game losing streak thanks to a 102-yard performance from running back T. J. Duckett.
    - Indianapolis Colts 38, Houston Texans 15
      - Peyton Manning throws for 311 yards and three touchdowns in a game with no playoff implications.
    - Jacksonville Jaguars 49, Oakland Raiders 11
      - Fred Taylor runs for a 62-yard touchdown on the Jaguars' first play, and the Raiders never regain momentum. Jacksonville clinches the No. 5 seed in the AFC.
    - Philadelphia Eagles 38, New Orleans Saints 23
      - Donovan McNabb throws for three touchdowns and helps put a dent in New Orleans' playoff hopes.
    - San Francisco 49ers 21, Tampa Bay Buccaneers 19
      - The 49ers recover from a 13–7 halftime deficit after the playoff-bound Bucs rest some of their starters.
    - Arizona Cardinals 30, Atlanta Falcons 27, OT
      - Anquan Boldin catches 13 passes for 162 yards and two touchdowns; Neil Rackers wins the game with a 31-yard field goal in overtime.
    - Baltimore Ravens at Seattle Seahawks
      - Troy Smith is unimpressive in his first NFL start; the Seahawks take the No. 3 seed in the NFC.
    - Tennessee Titans 10, New York Jets 6
      - Kyle Vanden Bosch has three of the Titans' six sacks; Tennessee makes the playoffs with a win at Indianapolis next week.
    - New England Patriots 28, Miami Dolphins 7
      - Randy Moss catches yet another two Tom Brady touchdown passes; the Patriots become the first 15–0 team in league history. The Dolphins secure the first pick in the 2008 NFL draft.
    - Washington Redskins 32, Minnesota Vikings 21
      - Todd Collins throws for two TDs, Clinton Portis runs for one touchdown and throws for a second, and the Skins put themselves in control of their playoff fate. A win over the Cowboys next week puts the Skins in.
- Basketball:
  - In a 95–90 Los Angeles Lakers win over the New York Knicks at Madison Square Garden, the Lakers' Kobe Bryant becomes the 31st player in NBA history to reach 20,000 career points, and surpasses Wilt Chamberlain as the youngest to reach that milestone.

== 22 December 2007 (Saturday) ==
- Cricket
  - English cricket team in Sri Lanka in 2007–08
    - 3rd Test: Sri Lanka 499/8 dec. (148.5 ov.) drew with England 81 (30.5 ov.) & 215/6 (95 ov.)
- American football:
  - NCAA Division I FBS bowl games:
    - PapaJohns.com Bowl in Birmingham: Cincinnati 31, Southern Miss 21
      - The Bearcats complete their first 10-win season since 1951.
    - New Mexico Bowl in Albuquerque: New Mexico 23, Nevada 0
      - The Lobos pick up their first postseason win since 1961, while holding the Wolf Pack scoreless for the first time since 1980.
    - Las Vegas Bowl in Las Vegas: BYU 17, UCLA 16
      - The Cougars block a field goal on the last play of the game to preserve the win.
  - National Football League Week 16:
    - Dallas Cowboys 20, Carolina Panthers 13
      - The Cowboys eliminate the Panthers from playoff contention; Terrell Owens leaves the game with an ankle injury.

== 21 December 2007 (Friday) ==
- American football:
  - NCAA Division I FBS bowl games:
    - New Orleans Bowl: Florida Atlantic 44, Memphis 27
  - National Football League:
    - Bill Parcells comes back to the NFL, signing a 4-year contract with the Miami Dolphins to become the team's executive vice president of football operations. (AP via ESPN)

== 20 December 2007 (Thursday) ==
- American football:
  - NCAA Division I FBS bowl games:
    - Poinsettia Bowl in San Diego: Utah 35, Navy 32
  - National Football League Week 16:
    - Pittsburgh Steelers 41, St. Louis Rams 24
      - The Steelers clinch a playoff berth, but lose running back Willie Parker to a broken leg in the 1st quarter.
- Ice hockey
  - National Hockey League
    - Marian Gaborik scores 5 goals against the New York Rangers, the most goals scored by a single player in a game since 1996.

== 18 December 2007 (Tuesday) ==
- Rugby union
  - The Australian Rugby Union announces that the Australian Rugby Championship, the country's first attempt to establish a national home-and-away league in the sport, will be scrapped after only one season. The league lost a reported A$4.7 million (US$4.0 million, €2.8 million, £2.0 million) in its only season. (Rugby Heaven)

== 17 December 2007 (Monday) ==
- American football
  - National Football League Week 15:
    - Minnesota Vikings 20, Chicago Bears 13
      - Tarvaris Jackson throws three interceptions and loses a fumble, but the Bears' unproductive offense is unable to capitalize on most of the Vikings' mistakes.

== 16 December 2007 (Sunday) ==
- Football (soccer):
  - 2007 FIFA Club World Cup Finals, Yokohama
    - Third-place game: Étoile Sportive du Sahel 2–2 Urawa Red Diamonds (Urawa Red Diamonds win on penalties).
    - Championship game: Boca Juniors 2–4 A.C. Milan (BBC)
- American football
  - National Football League Week 15:
    - New England Patriots 20, New York Jets 10
      - Tom Brady throws for a season-low 140 yards in windy conditions, but the Patriots score touchdowns off an interception and a blocked punt. New England becomes the second team in NFL history to go 14–0 and clinches the No. 1 seed in the AFC playoffs.
    - Tennessee Titans 26, Kansas City Chiefs 17
      - Roydell Williams catches two touchdown passes to help keep Tennessee alive in the race for a wild-card spot.
    - Tampa Bay Buccaneers 37, Atlanta Falcons 3
      - Micheal Spurlock becomes the first player in Tampa Bay history to return a kickoff for a touchdown.
    - New Orleans Saints 31, Arizona Cardinals 24
      - Drew Brees completes 26 of 30 passes for 315 yards and two touchdowns to keep the Saints' playoff hopes alive.
    - Jacksonville Jaguars 29, Pittsburgh Steelers 22
      - Fred Taylor caps off a 147-yard day with the game-winning 12-yard touchdown, clinching a playoff spot for the Jaguars.
    - Carolina Panthers 13, Seattle Seahawks 10
      - Matt Moore, the fourth quarterback to start a game for the Panthers this year, completes 19 of 27 passes with no interceptions.
    - Miami Dolphins 22, Baltimore Ravens 16
      - Cleo Lemon's 64-yard scoring pass to Greg Camarillo in overtime ends the Dolphins' 16-game losing streak.
    - Green Bay Packers 33, St. Louis Rams 14
      - Brett Favre throws for 227 yards to break Dan Marino's career record for passing yards.
    - Cleveland Browns 8, Buffalo Bills 0
      - Playing in a blizzard, Jamal Lewis picks up 163 yards on 33 carries while the Browns' defense keeps the Bills' running game in check. The Browns remain in the driver's seat for a wild-card berth.
    - Indianapolis Colts 21, Oakland Raiders 14
      - Peyton Manning finishes a 91-yard drive with the go-ahead 20-yard touchdown pass to Anthony Gonzalez late in the game; the Colts clinch a first-round bye in the playoffs.
    - San Diego Chargers 51, Detroit Lions 14
      - The Chargers pick off Jon Kitna five times and clinch the AFC West title.
    - Philadelphia Eagles 10, Dallas Cowboys 6
      - Tony Romo has his worst game as a pro, completing only 13 of 36 passes and throwing three interceptions.
    - Washington Redskins 22, New York Giants 10
      - In a windy Meadowlands, Todd Collins has a mistake-free performance in his first start in 10 years and Clinton Portis runs for 126 yards and a touchdown, putting the Skins back into the playoff hunt.

== 15 December 2007 (Saturday) ==
- American football
  - National Football League Week 15:
    - San Francisco 49ers 20, Cincinnati Bengals 13

== 14 December 2007 (Friday) ==
- Team sports at the 2007 Southeast Asian Games:
  - Baseball:
    - Thailand 5–4 Philippines
      - In the de facto gold medal game, the Thais dethrone the Filipinos.
  - Football (soccer):
    - Men's gold medal game: Myanmar 0–2 Thailand
      - The Thais win their 8th successive men's football gold medal.
- U.S. college football: Division I FCS final at Chattanooga, Tennessee
  - Appalachian State becomes the first team ever to win three straight titles in the division, defeating Delaware 49–21.

== 13 December 2007 (Thursday) ==
- Baseball
  - The 21-month independent investigation commission headed by former U.S. Senate Majority Leader George Mitchell releases its report into the rampant use of performance-enhancing substances in Major League Baseball between the late 1980s and the present. Approximately 70 current and former players are named in the report.
- American football
  - National Football League Week 15:
    - Houston Texans 31, Denver Broncos 13
      - Mario Williams and N.D. Kalu combine for five sacks of Jay Cutler; the Texans keep their slim playoff hopes alive.
- Cricket
  - English cricket team in Sri Lanka in 2007–08
    - 2nd Test: England 351 (126.2 ov.) & 250/3 (77 ov.) drew with Sri Lanka 548/9 dec. (186.5 ov.)
- Football (soccer):
  - 2007 FIFA Club World Cup Semifinal, Yokohama
    - Urawa Red Diamonds 0 – 1 A.C. Milan
- Team sports at the 2007 Southeast Asian Games:
  - Basketball:
    - Men's tournament: Philippines 94–53 Thailand
      - Philippines emerged on top of the standings to win the gold; Indonesia and Malaysia won silver and bronze, respectively.
    - Women's tournament: Malaysia 61–60 Thailand (Overtime)
      - In the battle of undefeated teams, Malaysia nosed out Thailand to win the gold. The Philippines settled for the bronze.
  - Football (soccer):
    - Women's gold medal game: Thailand 2–0 Vietnam
  - Softball:
    - Men's gold medal game: Philippines 11–2 Indonesia
    - Women's gold medal game: Philippines 7–0 Singapore

== 12 December 2007 (Wednesday) ==
- Football (soccer):
  - 2007 FIFA Club World Cup Semifinal, Tokyo
    - Étoile Sportive du Sahel 0 – 1 Boca Juniors

== 11 December 2007 (Tuesday) ==
- American football
  - National Football League
    - Bobby Petrino resigns as the coach of the Atlanta Falcons and returns to the college ranks as the head coach at Arkansas. (ESPN CBS)

== 10 December 2007 (Monday) ==
- Football (soccer):
  - 2007 FIFA Club World Cup Quarterfinal, Toyota City
    - Urawa Red Diamonds 3 – 1 Sepahan
- American football
  - National Football League Week 14:
    - New Orleans Saints 37, Atlanta Falcons 14
      - On the day that Michael Vick was sentenced to nearly two years in federal prison for funding a dog fighting ring in Virginia, the Falcons were simply unable to contain the resurgent Saints offense.

== 9 December 2007 (Sunday) ==
- Football (soccer):
  - 2007 FIFA Club World Cup Quarterfinal, Tokyo
    - Étoile Sportive du Sahel 1 – 0 C.F. Pachuca
- American football
  - National Football League Week 14:
    - Jacksonville Jaguars 37, Carolina Panthers 6
      - Fred Taylor sets a regular-season franchise record for longest run with an 80-yard touchdown in the blowout.
    - Houston Texans 28, Tampa Bay Buccaneers 14
      - Sage Rosenfels, starting at quarterback for the injured Matt Schaub, throws three touchdown passes.
    - Green Bay Packers 38, Oakland Raiders 7
      - Ryan Grant rushes for 156 yards and Will Blackmon returns a punt and a fumble for touchdowns in a game that clinches the NFC North for Green Bay.
    - Dallas Cowboys 28, Detroit Lions 27
      - Tony Romo leads Dallas on a game-winning drive in the final 2:15 that ends with a 16-yard touchdown pass to Jason Witten; the Cowboys clinch the NFC East.
    - Cincinnati Bengals 19, St. Louis Rams 10
      - Rookie quarterback Brock Berlin goes 17-for-28 for 153 yards and an interception in his debut for the Rams, but the hero is Shayne Graham, whose four field goals in the rain win it for the Bengals.
    - Buffalo Bills 38, Miami Dolphins 17
      - Both Fred Jackson and Marshawn Lynch run for 100 yards for the Bills, who hand the Dolphins their 16th-straight loss.
    - San Diego Chargers 23, Tennessee Titans 17 (OT)
      - The Chargers come back from a 17–3 deficit in the fourth quarter to clinch the AFC West. LaDainian Tomlinson rushes for 146 yards, including a 16-yard touchdown in overtime.
    - New York Giants 16, Philadelphia Eagles 13
      - David Akers' 57-yard field-goal attempt hits the upright as time expires.
    - Minnesota Vikings 27, San Francisco 49ers 7
      - 311-pound defensive tackle Kevin Williams returns an interception for a touchdown and Chester Taylor adds an 84-yard rushing score as the Vikings win their fifth-straight game.
    - Seattle Seahawks 42, Arizona Cardinals 21
      - Matt Hasselbeck throws four touchdown passes, Kurt Warner throws five interceptions and the Seahawks clinch their fourth NFC West title in as many years.
    - Denver Broncos 41, Kansas City Chiefs 7
      - Jay Cutler throws a career-high four touchdown passes.
    - New England Patriots 34, Pittsburgh Steelers 13
      - Throwing on almost every down, Tom Brady adds four more touchdown passes to his season total; the Patriots become the fifth team in league history to start the season 13–0.
    - Cleveland Browns 24, New York Jets 18
      - The Jets score three times in the final three minutes but fall short due to a 31-yard touchdown run by Jamal Lewis.
    - Indianapolis Colts 44, Baltimore Ravens 20
      - Peyton Manning throws four TD passes, Joseph Addai runs for two TDs and catches one of Manning's TD passes, and the Colts clinch a playoff berth.
- Boxer Joe Calzaghe is voted the BBC Sports Personality of the Year. Lewis Hamilton finishes second and Ricky Hatton third. The Team Award goes to the England national rugby union team and former football manager Sir Bobby Robson is given the Lifetime Achievement Award.

== 8 December 2007 (Saturday) ==
- Boxing:
  - Bouts at the MGM Grand Las Vegas
    - (United States) Floyd Mayweather Jr. def. (England) Ricky Hatton via a 10th-round technical knockout to retain the WBC welterweight title.
    - (United States) Jeff Lacy def. (United States) Peter Manfredo via unanimous decision.
    - (Mexico) Daniel Ponce de León def. (Mexico) Eduardo Escobedo via unanimous decision to retain the WBO super bantamweight title.
    - (United States) Edner Cherry knocked out (United States) Wes Ferguson in the 6th round.
- College football:
  - Florida quarterback Tim Tebow becomes the first sophomore to win the Heisman Trophy. For the second straight year, Arkansas running back Darren McFadden finishes second in the voting. (AP)
  - Division I FCS semifinals:
    - Delaware 20, Southern Illinois 17
    - Appalachian State 55, Richmond 35
      - Mountaineers QB Armanti Edwards runs for 313 yards, a Division I record for a quarterback in either FBS or FCS, and four touchdowns, and passes for three more TDs to punch ASU's ticket to Chattanooga for a chance at a third straight national title in the division.
- Football (soccer):
  - English Premier League
    - Reading 3 – 1 Liverpool
      - The Royals get their first win ever against one of the "Big Four" English football clubs in just their second Premier League season.

== 7 December 2007 (Friday) ==
- Football (soccer):
  - 2007 FIFA Club World Cup Play-in game, Tokyo
    - Sepahan 3 – 1 Waitakere United

== 6 December 2007 (Thursday) ==
- 2007 Southeast Asian Games:
  - The opening ceremony for the 24th Southeast Asian Games at Nakhon Ratchasima, Thailand was held.
  - With several events already underway (or finished) such as shooting, Thailand leads the medal count with 21 golds, while Singapore has 10 golds.
- American football
  - National Football League Week 14:
    - Washington Redskins 24, Chicago Bears 16
      - Both starting quarterbacks, Jason Campbell and Rex Grossman, are knocked out of the game early with injuries. Todd Collins tosses two touchdowns in a game for the first time in a decade for the Redskins, while Brian Griese throws a touchdown and gives up two interceptions for the Bears.

== 5 December 2007 (Wednesday) ==
- Cricket
  - English cricket team in Sri Lanka in 2007–08
    - 1st Test: Sri Lanka 188 (59.4 ov.) & 442/8 dec. (127.2 ov.) beat England 281 (93.1 ov.) & 261 (94.0 ov.) by 88 runs
  - Pakistan cricket team in India in 2007–08
    - 3rd Test: India 616 (130.0 ov.) & 184/4 dec. (42.4 ov.) drew with Pakistan 456 (151.1 ov.) & 214/4 (77.0 ov.)

== 4 December 2007 (Tuesday) ==
- Cricket
  - English cricket team in Sri Lanka in 2007–08
    - 1st Test, Day 4, stumps: Sri Lanka 188 & 442/8 dec. vs. England 281 & 9/1 (5.0 ov.)
      - Kumar Sangakkara becomes the first batsman to score 150 or more in four consecutive Tests, striking for 152 to lead the hosts, who declare and set England a 350-run target to win.

== 3 December 2007 (Monday) ==
- Cricket
  - English cricket team in Sri Lanka in 2007–08
    - 1st Test, Day 3, stumps: Sri Lanka 188 & 167/2 (52.0 ov) vs. England 281 all out (93.1 ov.)
      - Muttiah Muralitharan bowls Paul Collingwood to become the leading career wicket-taker in Test cricket history. He adds the wicket of Matthew Hoggard to take his career total to 710.
      - Sanath Jayasuriya gives Sri Lanka a boost with the bat at the start of the second innings with 78, which includes six fours from one over, making him only the second batsman to hit six fours in a six-ball over in Test cricket. After today's proceedings, Jayasuriya announces his retirement from Tests, effective at the end of the first Test. He will continue to play ODIs.
- American football
  - National Football League Week 13:
    - New England Patriots 27, Baltimore Ravens 24
      - The Patriots' perfect record is saved when Tom Brady drives New England to the winning score in the closing minutes. Two fourth-down conversions, one on a penalty, are followed by a touchdown pass to Jabar Gaffney.

== 2 December 2007 (Sunday) ==
- Cricket
  - English cricket team in Sri Lanka in 2007–08
    - 1st Test, Day 2, stumps: England 186/6 (63.0 ov.) vs. Sri Lanka 188 all out (59.4 ov.)
      - Sri Lanka off spinner Muttiah Muralitharan takes 4 wickets for 30. His last wicket before rain halted proceedings, an edge by Ravi Bopara caught by Prasanna Jayawardene, ties him with Australian leg spinner Shane Warne for most career Test wickets, at 708.
- American football
  - National Football League Week 13:
    - Minnesota Vikings 42, Detroit Lions 10
      - In its fourth-straight loss, Detroit is outgained on the ground, 216 yards to 23.
    - Seattle Seahawks 28 Philadelphia Eagles 24
      - Philly has the ball deep in Seattle territory late, but Lofa Tatupu's third interception of A. J. Feeley seals the game.
    - San Diego Chargers 24. Kansas City Chiefs 10
      - LaDainian Tomlinson runs for 177 yards and two touchdowns, while the Charger defense sacks K.C. quarterbacks eight times and intercepts them three times.
    - New York Jets 40, Miami Dolphins 13
      - The Dolphins commit five turnovers in falling to 0–12.
    - Indianapolis Colts 28, Jacksonville Jaguars 25
      - Peyton Manning throws four touchdown passes as the Colts take a two-game lead over in Jaguars in the AFC South.
    - Carolina Panthers 31, San Francisco 49ers 14
      - The Panthers win their first home game in more than a year thanks to six 49er turnovers and an adequate performance by Vinny Testaverde.
    - Tennessee Titans 28, Houston Texans 20
      - Vince Young throws for 248 yards and two touchdowns and adds another 44 yards on the ground.
    - St. Louis Rams 28, Atlanta Falcons 16
      - Gus Frerotte tallies 311 passing yards, and Steven Jackson seals the win with a 50-yard touchdown run.
    - Buffalo Bills 17, Washington Redskins 16
      - Aided by an unsportsmanlike conduct penalty on Redskins coach Joe Gibbs, Rian Lindell's fifth field goal in the closing seconds wins the game for Buffalo.
      - In memory of Sean Taylor, who was murdered last Tuesday, the Redskins line up for the first play without a free safety, the position Taylor played.
    - Arizona Cardinals 27, Cleveland Browns 21
      - The Browns' four turnovers lead to 21 Arizona points, including a 71-yard interception return by Roderick Hood.
    - New York Giants 21, Chicago Bears 16
      - The Giants trail by nine late, but Eli Manning, Derrick Ward and Reuben Droughns lead them to a comeback win.
    - Oakland Raiders 34, Denver Broncos 20
      - JaMarcus Russell, sharing time with Josh McCown in his NFL debut, completes four of seven passes for 56 yards. McCown adds three touchdowns, while Justin Fargas rushes for 146 yards.
    - Tampa Bay Buccaneers 27, New Orleans Saints 23
      - After the Saints fumble on a trick play, Josh McCown's brother Luke completes the game-winning touchdown pass to Jerramy Stevens.
    - Pittsburgh Steelers 24, Cincinnati Bengals 10
  - College football: Bowl Championship Series Selection
    - 2008 BCS National Championship Game, January 7, 2008
      - Ohio State vs. LSU
    - 2008 Orange Bowl, January 3, 2008
      - Virginia Tech vs. Kansas
    - 2008 Fiesta Bowl, January 2, 2008
      - Oklahoma vs. West Virginia
    - 2008 Rose Bowl, January 1, 2008
      - USC vs. Illinois
    - 2008 Sugar Bowl, January 1, 2008
      - Hawaiʻi vs. Georgia
- Auto racing:
  - V8 Supercar: Dunlop Grand Finale, at Phillip Island Grand Prix Circuit, Phillip Island, Victoria, Australia:
  (1) Garth Tander (Australia) (2) Todd Kelly (Australia) (3) Jamie Whincup (Australia)
  The round victory for Garth Tander secured his first championship, defeating Jamie Whincup 625 points to 623 after a 14-round, 10-month season. Whincup's teammate Craig Lowndes was third in the championship.
  - Rallying: Rally GB, Wales, Great Britain:
  (1) Mikko Hirvonen (Finland) (2) Marcus Grönholm (Finland) (3) Sébastien Loeb (France)
  Third place for Loeb, just one spot behind title rival Grönholm, is enough for the Citroën driver to wrap up his fourth consecutive world championship, 116 points to 112.

== 1 December 2007 (Saturday) ==
- American football
  - Conference championship games:
    - MAC: Central Michigan 35, Miami (Ohio) 10
    - Conference USA: UCF 44, Tulsa 25
    - ACC: (6) Virginia Tech 30, (11) Boston College 16
      - With two interceptions of Matt Ryan in the last three minutes, the second returned for a score, the Hokies reach the Orange Bowl.
    - SEC: (5) LSU 21, (14) Tennessee 14
      - Late picks also tell the story in Atlanta. Jonathan Zenon breaks a tie with a return of an Erik Ainge pass; Darry Beckwith's interception ends the Vols' comeback attempt. LSU will play in the Sugar Bowl unless it sneaks into the BCS National Championship Game.
    - Big 12: (9) Oklahoma 38, (1) Missouri 17
      - The Sooners throw the Bowl Championship Series into chaos by knocking off the top-ranked Tigers.
  - NCAA Division I FBS other BCS Top 25:
    - Florida Atlantic 38, Troy 32
      - FAU and Troy will share the Sun Belt Conference championship, but FAU wins the conference's automatic bowl bid at the New Orleans Bowl.
    - Pittsburgh 13, (2) West Virginia 9 (Backyard Brawl)
      - With Pat White out for most of the game with a dislocated finger and Steve Slaton a nonfactor due to a suffocating Pitt defense, the Mountaineers are almost assuredly knocked out of the 2008 BCS National Championship Game.
    - (8) USC 24, UCLA 7 (Victory Bell)
      - The Trojans hold the Bruins to 12 rushing yards and win their sixth-consecutive Pac-10 title. USC will play in the Rose Bowl.
    - (12) Hawaiʻi 35, Washington 28
      - A late pick also seals the deal in the islands. Thanks to three lost fumbles, the Warriors fall behind 21–0 in the first quarter, but they fight back to take the lead on a Colt Brennan TD pass to Ryan Grice-Mullen with 44 seconds left, and seal a perfect regular season and ultimately a BCS bowl bid when Ryan Mouton intercepts Jake Locker in the Warriors' end zone with 3 seconds left.
    - (13) Arizona State 20, Arizona 17 (Territorial Cup)
    - Oregon State 38, (17) Oregon 30 (2 OT) (Civil War)
    - (19) BYU 48, San Diego State 27
- Football (soccer)
  - International Club Friendly at Westpac Stadium, Wellington, New Zealand
    - Wellington Phoenix FC (A-League) 1 – 4 Los Angeles Galaxy (MLS)
- Tennis: 2007 Davis Cup final at Portland, Oregon, United States
  - Twin brothers Bob and Mike Bryan defeat Igor Andreev and Nikolay Davydenko 7–6(4), 6–4, 6–2 in doubles to give the USA an insurmountable 3–0 lead over Russia in the Davis Cup final. This is the USA's first Davis Cup win since 1995.
