= David Esquer =

American college baseball coach

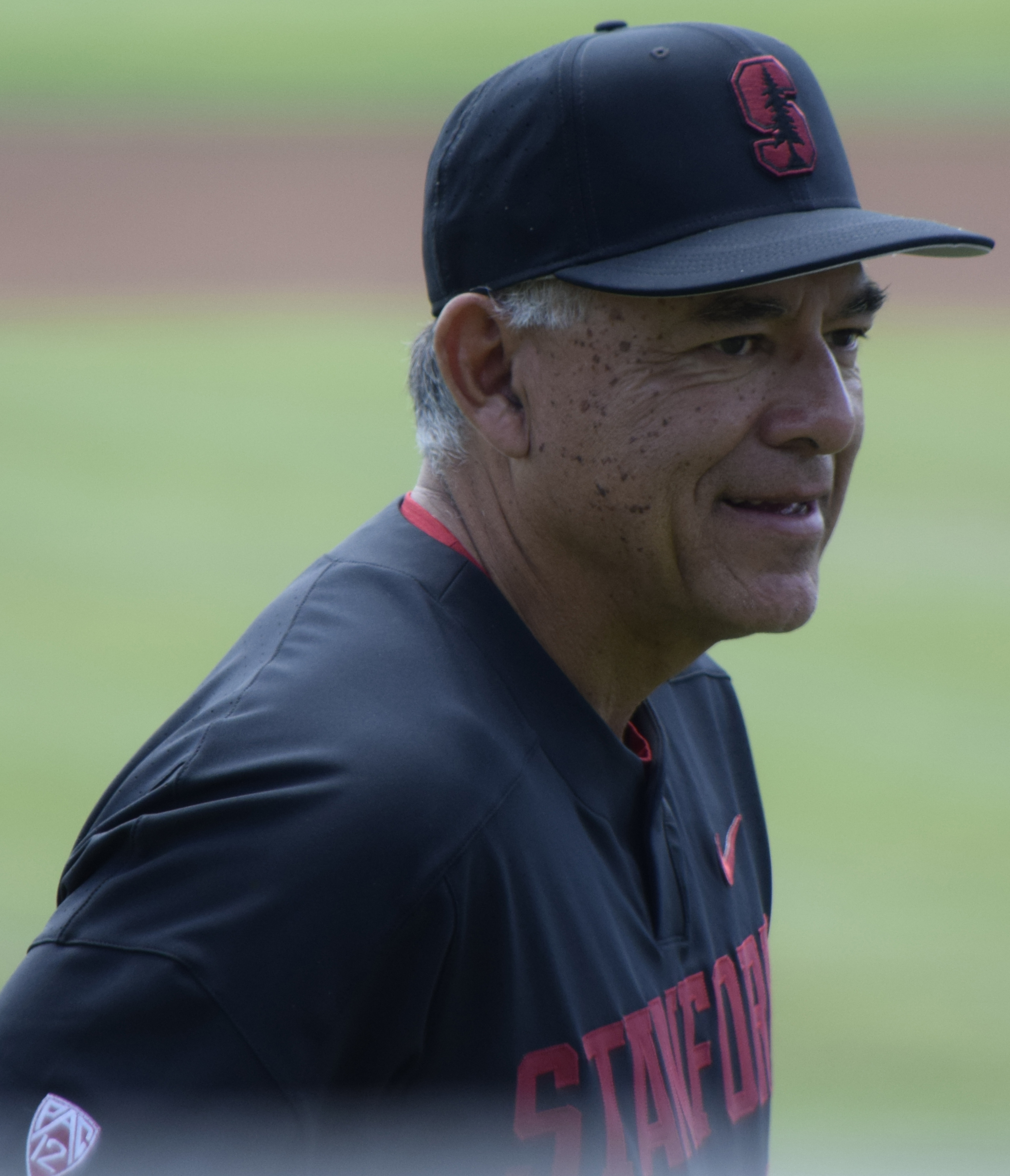
- Esquer with Stanford in 2018

Current position
- Title: Head coach
- Team: Stanford
- Conference: ACC
- Record: 303–176 (.633)

Biographical details
- Born: April 13, 1965 (age 61)

Playing career
- 1984–1987: Stanford
- Position: Shortstop

Coaching career (HC unless noted)
- 1991–1996: Stanford (asst.)
- 1997–1999: Pepperdine (asst.)
- 2000–2017: California
- 2018–present: Stanford

Head coaching record
- Overall: 828–643–2 (.563)
- Tournaments: NCAA: 35–26

Accomplishments and honors

Championships
- 3x Pac-12 regular season (2018, 2022, 2023); Pac-12 tournament (2022); 4x NCAA Regional (2019, 2021–2023)

Awards
- 4× Pac-10/12 Coach of the Year (2001, 2018, 2022, 2023); NCBWA Coach of the Year (2011)

David Charles Esquer (born April 13, 1965) is an American college baseball coach. He is the head coach of the Stanford Cardinal baseball team. He previously served as head coach of the California Golden Bears baseball team from 2000–2017.

== Early life and education ==
Esquer attended Palma High School in Salinas, California where he played basketball, football, and baseball. Esquer was team captain and MVP of the baseball team and was named his high school's athlete of the year. He attended Stanford University and was a starting shortstop for Stanford Cardinal baseball under head coach Mark Marquess and as a senior helped Stanford win the 1987 College World Series, in which he was named to the all-tournament team for hitting .350 with six RBI.

== Professional playing career ==
After graduating from Stanford with a bachelor's degree in economics and a master's degree in sociology in 1987, Esquer played three seasons in the minor league organizations of the Baltimore Orioles, California Angels, and Milwaukee Brewers.

== Coaching career ==
In 1991, Esquer returned to Stanford to become an assistant coach at Stanford under Marquess. After six seasons at Stanford, from 1997 to 1999, Esquer was an assistant coach at Pepperdine handling recruiting, hitting instruction, infield coaching, and third base coach duties.

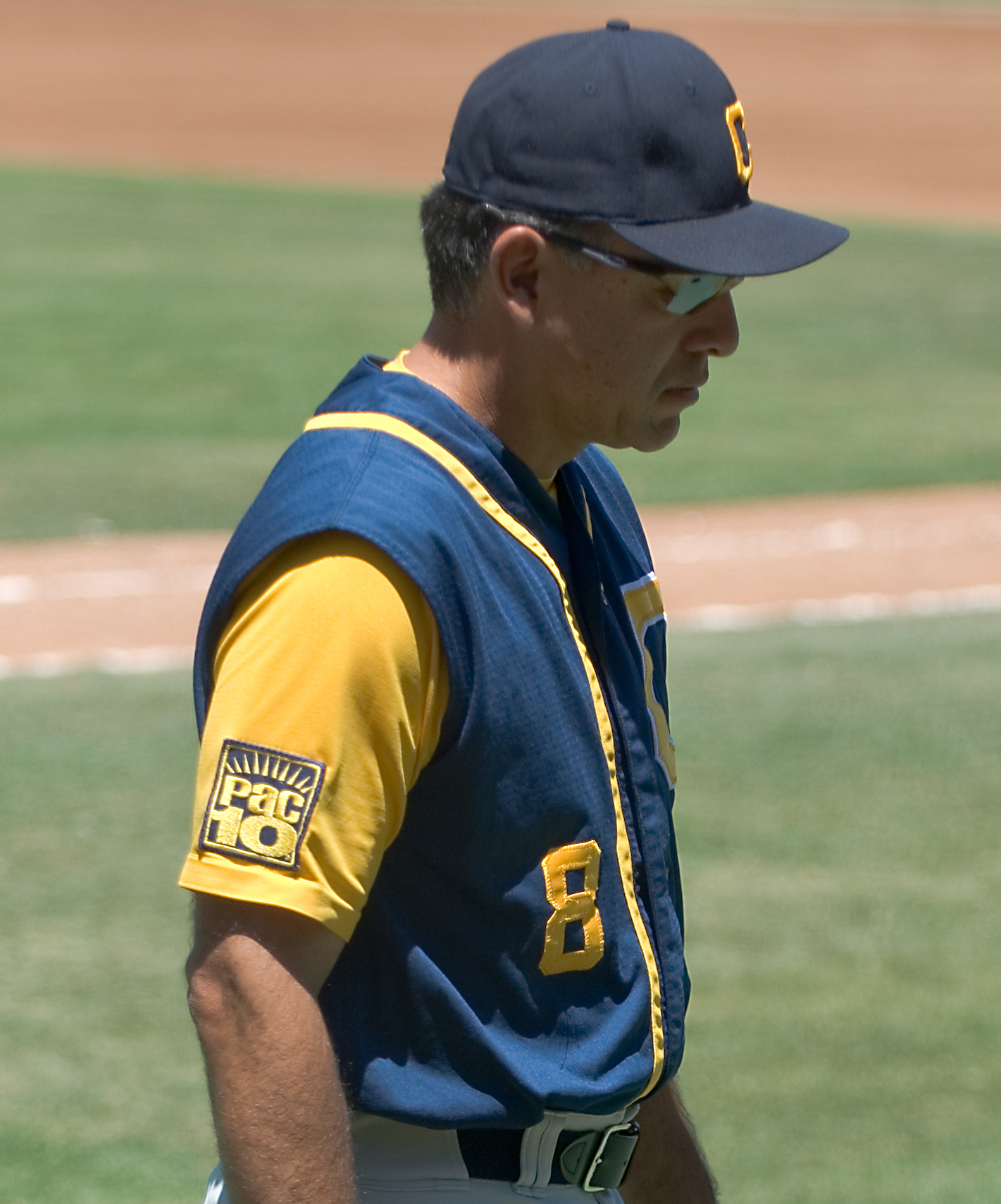
Esquer with Cal in 2007

Beginning in the 2000 season, Esquer was hired as head baseball coach at Cal. In 18 seasons with the Golden Bears, Esquer recorded a record of 525–467–2 (.529), and led the Bears to NCAA Regionals in 2001, 2008, 2010, and 2015, and was named Pacific-10 Conference coach of the year in 2001. In 2011, Esquer led the Bears back to their first College World Series appearance since 1992 and was named national baseball coach of the year by the National Collegiate Baseball Writers Association.

On June 16, 2017, Esquer stepped down from his position at Cal to accept the head baseball coaching position at Stanford, his alma mater.

=== Head coaching record ===
The following is a table of Esquer's yearly records as an NCAA head baseball coach.

Record table
Season	Team	Overall	Conference	Standing	Postseason
California Golden Bears (Pac-10/Pac-12 Conference) (2000–2017)
2000	California	25–28	11-13	5th	
2001	California	34–25	14–10	4th	NCAA Regional
2002	California	29–27	11–13	5th	
2003	California	28–27	10–14	7th	
2004	California	25–31	9–15	T–8th	
2005	California	34–23	13–11	5th	
2006	California	26–28	9–15	9th	
2007	California	29–26	12–12	4th	
2008	California	33–21–2	12–12	5th	NCAA Regional
2009	California	24–29	9–18	9th	
2010	California	29–25	13–14	6th	NCAA Regional
2011	California	38–23	13–13	6th	College World Series
2012	California	29–25	12–18	T–8th	
2013	California	23–31	10–20	T–8th	
2014	California	26–27	13–17	8th	
2015	California	36–21	18–12	T–3rd	NCAA Regional
2016	California	32–21	14–16	T–8th	
2017	California	25–29	15–15	T–5th	
California:		525–467–2 (.529)	218–258 (.458)		
Stanford Cardinal (Pac-12 Conference) (2018–2024)
2018	Stanford	46–12	22–8	1st	NCAA Regional
2019	Stanford	45–14	22–7	2nd	NCAA Super Regional
2020	Stanford	5–11	0–0		Season canceled due to COVID-19
2021	Stanford	39–17	17–10	3rd	College World Series
2022	Stanford	47–18	21–9	1st	College World Series
2023	Stanford	44–20	23–7	1st	College World Series
2024	Stanford	22–33	11–19	8th	Pac-12 Tournament
Stanford:			116–60 (.659)		
Stanford Cardinal (Atlantic Coast Conference) (2025–present)
2025	Stanford	27–25	11–19	13th	ACC Tournament
2026	Stanford	28–26	13–17	12th	
Stanford:		303–176 (.633)	24–36 (.400)		
Total:		828–643–2 (.563)			
National champion Postseason invitational champion Conference regular season champion Conference regular season and conference tournament champion Division regular season champion Division regular season and conference tournament champion Conference tournament champion

== Personal life ==
Esquer and his wife Lynn have two children, Gabrielle and Xavier.

== See also ==
- List of current NCAA Division I baseball coaches
