= Pac-12 Conference Coach of the Year =

Pac-12 Conference Coach of the Year may refer to:

- Pac-12 Conference Baseball Coach of the Year
- Pac-12 Conference Football Coach of the Year
- Pac-12 Conference Men's Basketball Coach of the Year
