= New Zealand cricket team in South Africa in 2007–08 =

2007 cricket tour in South Africa

	New Zealand	South Africa
- Dates: 25 October – 2 December 2007
Captains	Daniel Vettori	Graeme Smith

Test series
- Result: South Africa won the 2-match series 2–0
Most runs	Stephen Fleming (154)	Jacques Kallis (346)
Most wickets	Chris Martin (6)	Dale Steyn (20)
- Player of the series: Dale Steyn (SA)

One Day International series
- Results: South Africa won the 3-match series 2–1
Most runs	Jamie How (181)	Herschelle Gibbs (119)
Most wickets	Kyle Mills (9)	André Nel (4)
- Player of the series: Kyle Mills (NZ)

New Zealand national cricket team toured South Africa from 25 October to 2 December 2007 and played two Test matches, three ODI matches and one T20I match.

== Squads ==
Test Squads		ODI Squads	
South Africa	New Zealand	South Africa	New Zealand
Graeme Smith (c)	Daniel Vettori (c)	Graeme Smith (c)	Daniel Vettori (c)
Mark Boucher (wk)	Brendon McCullum (wk)	Mark Boucher (wk)	Brendon McCullum (wk)
Hashim Amla	Shane Bond (withdrawn)	Johan Botha	Shane Bond
AB de Villiers	Craig Cumming	AB de Villiers	James Franklin (withdrawn)
Herschelle Gibbs	Stephen Fleming	Jean-Paul Duminy	Mark Gillespie
Paul Harris	Peter Fulton (withdrawn)	Herschelle Gibbs	Gareth Hopkins
Jacques Kallis	Mark Gillespie	Jacques Kallis	Jamie How
André Nel	Chris Martin	Charl Langeveldt	Michael Mason
Makhaya Ntini	Michael Mason	Albie Morkel	Kyle Mills
Shaun Pollock	Kyle Mills	André Nel	Jacob Oram
Ashwell Prince	Jacob Oram	Makhaya Ntini	Jeetan Patel
Dale Steyn	Michael Papps	Vernon Philander	Scott Styris
	Jeetan Patel	Shaun Pollock	Ross Taylor
	Scott Styris	Dale Steyn	Lou Vincent
	Ross Taylor	Morne van Wyk	

- Lou Vincent was called up to the Test squad to replace Fulton.
- Iain O'Brien was called up to the Test squad to replace Mills. Mills returned to the Test squad to replace Bond who was injured during the first Test.
- Jamie How was called up to the Test squad on 11 November.
- Chris Martin was called up to the ODI squad to replace Franklin.
- Craig Cumming was called up to the ODI squad on 9 November.

== Test series ==
=== 1st Test ===
8–12 November 2007
Scorecard

South Africa	v	New Zealand
226 (74.3 overs); Herschelle Gibbs 63 (125); Shane Bond 4/73 (17 overs)		118 (41.3 overs); Stephen Fleming 40 (48); Dale Steyn 5/34 (14.3 overs)
422/3d (126 overs); Jacques Kallis 186 (262); Jacob Oram 1/49 (16.4 overs)		172 (51 overs); Daniel Vettori 46* (58); Dale Steyn 5/59 (17 overs)

South Africa won by 358 runs
Wanderers Stadium, Johannesburg
Umpires: Mark Benson (Eng) and Daryl Harper (Aus)
Player of the match: Dale Steyn (SA)

- South Africa won the toss and elected to bat.
- Ross Taylor (NZ) made his Test debut.
- This was Daniel Vettori's first Test as New Zealand captain.
- Jacques Kallis (SA) became the eighth batsman to pass 9,000 runs in Tests.
- This was New Zealand's worst defeat, and South Africa's biggest win in terms of runs in Tests (358), before the latter's 492-run win against Australia in 2018.

=== 2nd Test ===
16–20 November 2007
Scorecard

New Zealand	v	South Africa
188 (56.4 overs); Craig Cumming 48 (107); Dale Steyn 4/42 (14 overs)		383 (97.3 overs); Jacques Kallis 131 (177); Mark Gillespie 5/136 (30 overs)
136 (34.3 overs); Stephen Fleming 54 (85); Dale Steyn 6/49 (10.3 overs)

South Africa won by an innings and 59 runs
SuperSport Park, Centurion
Umpires: Mark Benson (Eng) and Daryl Harper (Aus)
Player of the match: Dale Steyn (SA)

- New Zealand won the toss and elected to bat.
- Mark Gillespie (NZ) made his Test debut.
- Hashim Amla (SA) passed 1,000 runs in Tests.
- Hashim Amla and Jacques Kallis (SA) became the eighth pair to record two consecutive partnerships of more than 200 runs in Tests.
- Jacques Kallis became the first South Africa player to score at least a half-century in eight successive Tests.

== Only T20I ==
23 November 2007
Scorecard

New Zealand; 129/7 (20 overs)	v	South Africa; 131/7 (19.5 overs)
Kyle Mills 33* (24); Shaun Pollock 3/28 (4 overs)		AB de Villiers 52* (45); Jeetan Patel 2/17 (4 overs)

South Africa won by 3 wickets
Wanderers Stadium, Johannesburg
Umpires: Ian Howell (SA) and Brian Jerling (SA)
Player of the match: AB de Villiers (SA)

- South Africa won the toss and elected to field.
- Gareth Hopkins, Jamie How (both NZ) and Dale Steyn (SA) made their T20I debuts

== ODI series ==
=== 1st ODI ===
25 November 2007
Scorecard

New Zealand; 248/6 (50 overs)	v	South Africa; 249/8 (49.5 overs)
Jamie How 90 (124); André Nel 3/46 (10 overs)		AB de Villiers 87 (103); Kyle Mills 5/25 (10 overs)

South Africa won by 2 wickets
Kingsmead, Durban
Umpires: Mark Benson (Eng) and Brian Jerling (SA)
Player of the match: AB de Villiers (SA)

- South Africa won the toss and elected to field.

=== 2nd ODI ===
30 November 2007
Scorecard

South Africa; 209/9 (50 overs)	v	New Zealand; 210/3 (38.4 overs)
Shaun Pollock 52 (75); Kyle Mills 3/43 (8 overs)		Brendon McCullum 81 (85); Charl Langeveldt 1/40 (8 overs)

New Zealand won by 7 wickets
St. George's Park, Port Elizabeth
Umpires: Mark Benson (Eng) and Marais Erasmus (SA)
Player of the match: Jamie How and Brendon McCullum (both NZ)

- South Africa won the toss and elected to bat.

=== 3rd ODI ===
2 December
Scorecard

New Zealand; 238/8 (50 overs)	v	South Africa; 242/5 (45.2 overs)
Mathew Sinclair 73 (78); Charl Langeveldt 2/46 (10 overs)		Herschelle Gibbs 119 (101); Daniel Vettori 3/33 (10 overs)

South Africa won by 5 wickets
Newlands, Cape Town
Umpires: Mark Benson (Eng) and Ian Howell (SA)
Player of the match: Herschelle Gibbs (SA)

- New Zealand won the toss and elected to bat.
