= Pac-12 Conference Baseball Coach of the Year =

- Awarded for: The most outstanding baseball coach in the Pac-12 Conference
- Country: United States
- First award: 1978
- Currently held by: Chip Hale, Arizona

The Pac-12 Conference Coach of the Year is a baseball award given to the Pac-12 Conference's most outstanding coach. From 1978 to 1998, an award was given to the most outstanding Coach in both the North and South divisions. After the 1999 season, the divisions were eliminated.

== Key ==
^{†}	Co-Coaches of the Year
	Awarded one of the following National Coach of the Year awards that year: Collegiate Baseball Coach of the Year (CB); Baseball America Coach of the Year (BA)
Coach (X)	Denotes the number of times the coach had been awarded the Coach of the Year award at that point
*	Elected to the National College Baseball Hall of Fame as a coach but is no longer active
*^	Active coach who has been elected to the National College Baseball Hall of Fame (as a coach)
Conf. W–L	Conference win–loss record for that season
Conf./Div. St.^{T}	Conference/Division standing at year's end (^{T}denotes a tie)
Overall W–L	Overall win–loss record for that season
Season^{‡}	Team won the College World Series

== Winners ==
=== 1999–Present ===
Season	Coach	School	National Coach of the Year Awards	Conf. W–L	Conf. St.	Overall W–L	Reference
1999	Mark Marquess (8)	Stanford	—	19–5	1	50–15	
2000	Pat Murphy	Arizona State	—	17–7	1^{T}	44–15	
2001	David Esquer	California	—	18–6	1	45–19	
2002	Mike Gillespie (4)	Southern California	—	37–24	1	46–14	
2003	Mark Marquess (9)	Stanford	—	18–6	1	51–18	
2004	Gary Adams	UCLA	—	35–29	3	46–14	
2005	Pat Casey (2)	Oregon State	—	19–5	1	46–12	
2006^{‡}	Pat Casey (3)	Oregon State	BA, CB	16–7	1	50–16	
2007	Pat Murphy (2)	Arizona State	—	19–5	1	49–15	
2008	Pat Murphy (3)	Arizona State	—	16–8	1	49–13	
2009	Pat Murphy (4)	Arizona State	—	21–6	1	51–14	
2010	Tim Esmay	Arizona State	—	20–7	1	52–10	
2011	Pat Casey (4)	Oregon State	—	17–10	3	41–19	
2012^{‡}	Andy Lopez	Arizona	CB	20–10	1^{T}	48–17	
2013	Pat Casey (5)	Oregon State	—	24–6	1	52–13	
2014	Lindsay Meggs (1)	Washington	—	21–9	2	41–17	
2015	John Savage	UCLA	—	22–8	1	45–16	
2016	Bill Kinneberg	Utah	—	19–11	1	26–29	
2017	Pat Casey (6)	Oregon State	—	27–3		56–6	
2018	David Esquer (2)	Stanford	—	22–8		46–12	
2019	John Savage (2)	UCLA	—	24–5		52–11	
2020	No winner due to COVID-19 pandemic	—	—	—	—	—	
2021	Jay Johnson	Arizona	—	21–9	1	45–18	
2022	David Esquer (3)	Stanford	—	21–9	1	47–18	
2023	David Esquer (4)	Stanford	—	23–7	1	44–20	
2024	Chip Hale	Arizona	—	20–10	1	TBD	

=== North Division (1978–1998) ===
Season	Coach	School	National Coach of the Year Awards	Conf. W–L	Div. St.	Overall W–L	Reference
1978	Chuck Brayton*	Washington State	—	15–3	1	41–17	
1979	Bob MacDonald	Washington	—	11–5	2	37–13	
1980	Chuck Brayton* (2)	Washington State	—	11–3	1	36–10	
1981	Bob MacDonald (2)	Washington	—	12–6	1	34–18	
1982	Jack Riley	Oregon State	—	16–8	1	29–15	
1983	Jack Riley (2)	Oregon State	—	17–7	1	27–15	
1984	Jack Dunn	Portland State	—	15–6	1^{T}	39–17	
1985	Bob MacDonald (3)	Washington	—	15–9	2	36–12	
1986	Jack Riley (3)	Oregon State	—	18–5	1	39–15	
1987	Chuck Brayton* (3)	Washington State	—	18–6	1	44–19	
1988	Chuck Brayton* (4)	Washington State	—	18–4	1	52–14	
1989	Chuck Brayton* (5)	Washington State	—	16–8	1	37–20	
1990	Bob MacDonald (4)	Washington	—	19–05	3	47–19	
1991	Chuck Brayton* (6)	Washington State	—	14–6	1	37–25	
1992	Bob MacDonald (5)	Washington	—	20–10	3	39–21	
1993	Jack Riley (4)	Oregon State	—	20–10	2	32–18	
1994^{†}	Steve Hertz	Gonzaga	—	13–17	4	29–23	
1994^{†}	Jack Riley (5)	Oregon State	—	22–5	1	35–16	
1995	Steve Farrington	Washington State	—	18–12	1	28–30	
1996	Ken Knutson	Washington	—	16–8	1	30–28	
1997^{†}	Pat Casey	Oregon State	—	18–6	2	38–12-1	
1997^{†}	Ken Knutson (2)	Washington	—	20–4	1	46–20	
1998	Ken Knutson (3)	Washington	—	17–7	1	41–17	

=== South Division (1978–1998) ===
Season	Coach	School	National Coach of the Year Awards	Conf. W–L	Div. St.	Overall W–L	Reference
1978	Rod Dedeaux*	Southern California	—	15–3	1	56–10	
1979	Gary Adams	UCLA	—	21–9	1	43–18	
1980^{‡†}	Jerry Kindall*	Arizona	—	17–13	1^{T}	45–21-1	
1980^{†}	Bob Milano	California	—	17–13	1^{T}	44–23	
1981^{‡}	Jim Brock	Arizona State	—	26–4	1	55–13	
1982	Jim Brock (2)	Arizona State	—	23–5	1	58–15	
1983	Mark Marquess	Stanford	—	20–10	1	41–17-1	
1984	Jim Brock (3)	Arizona State	—	23–7	1	55–20	
1985	Mark Marquess (2)	Stanford	—	23–7	1	47–15	
1986	Gary Adams	UCLA	—	18–6	1	44–19	
1987^{‡}	Mark Marquess (3)	Stanford	BA	21–9	1	53–17	
1988^{‡}	Jim Brock (3)	Arizona State	BA	21–9	1	60–13	
1989	Jerry Kindall (2)	Arizona	—	23–7	1	45–18-1	
1990	Mark Marquess (4)	Stanford	—	24–6	1	59–12	
1991	Mike Gillespie	Southern California	—	23–7	1	46–17-1	
1992^{†}	Jerry Kindall*	Arizona	—	18–12	1	34–23-1	
1992^{†}	Bob Milano	California	—	14–16	5	35–28	
1993	Jim Brock (4)	Arizona State	—	19–11	1	46–20	
1994	Mark Marquess (5)	Stanford	—	21–9	1	36–24	
1995	Mike Gillespie (2)	Southern California	—	21–9	1	49–21	
1996	Mike Gillespie (3)	Southern California	—	24-6	1	44–16-1	
1997	Mark Marquess (6)	Stanford	—	21–0	1	45–20	
1998	Mark Marquess (7)	Stanford	—	22–8	1	42–14-1	

== Winners by school ==
School (year joined)^{a}	Winners	Years
Stanford (1959)	12	1983, 1985, 1987, 1990, 1994, 1997, 1998, 1999, 2003, 2018, 2022, 2023
Oregon State (1964)	11	1982, 1983, 1986, 1993, 1994^{†}, 1997^{†}, 2005, 2006^{†}, 2011, 2013, 2017
Arizona State (1978)	10	1981, 1982, 1984, 1988, 1993, 2000, 2007, 2008, 2009, 2010
Washington (1959)	9	1979, 1981, 1985, 1990, 1992, 1996, 1997^{†}, 1998, 2013
Washington State (1962)	7	1978, 1980, 1987, 1988, 1989, 1991, 1995
Arizona (1978)	6	1980^{†}, 1989, 1992^{†}, 2012, 2021, 2024
Southern California (1959)	5	1978, 1991, 1995, 1996, 2002
UCLA (1959)	5	1979, 1986, 2004, 2015, 2019
California (1959)	3	1980^{†}, 1992^{†}, 2001
Utah (1963)	1	2016
Portland State^{b} (1982)	1	1984
Gonzaga^{c} (1982)	1	1994^{†}

== Footnotes ==
- ^{a} For purposes of this table, the "year joined" reflects the year that each team joined the conference now known as the Pac-12 as currently chartered. Although the Pac-12 claims the Pacific Coast Conference (PCC), founded in 1915, as part of its own history, that conference disbanded in 1959 due to infighting and scandal. That same year, five PCC members established the Athletic Association of Western Universities (AAWU) under a new charter that functions to this day. The Coach of the Year Award was not established until 1978, by which time all of the final members of the PCC except for Idaho were reunited in what was then the Pac-8.
- ^{b} Portland State was an affiliate member of the Pac-10 from 1982 to 1998.
- ^{c} Gonzaga was an affiliate member of the Pac-10 from 1982 to 1995.
