= 2007 Las Vegas Bowl =

2007 Pioneer PureVision Las Vegas Bowl
- 16th Las Vegas Bowl
- Las Vegas Bowl logo
| UCLA Bruins | BYU Cougars |
| (6–6) | (10–2) |
| Pac-10 | Mountain West |
| 16 | 17 |
| Head coach: DeWayne Walker | Head coach: Bronco Mendenhall |
| AP / Coaches / BCS; NR / NR / NR | AP / Coaches / BCS; 19 / 19 / 17 |
| | 1 | 2 | 3 | 4 | Total |
|---|---|---|---|---|---|
| UCLA | 3 | 10 | 0 | 3 | 16 |
| BYU | 3 | 14 | 0 | 0 | 17 |
- Date: December 22, 2007
- Season: 2007
- Stadium: Sam Boyd Stadium
- Location: Whitney, Nevada
- MVP: WR Austin Collie, BYU
- Favorite: BYU by 6
- Referee: Ed Kierce (C-USA)
- Attendance: 40,712
- Payout: US$1,000,000 per team

United States TV coverage
- Network: ESPN
- Announcers: Brad Nessler, Bob Griese, Paul Maguire, and Bonnie Bernstein

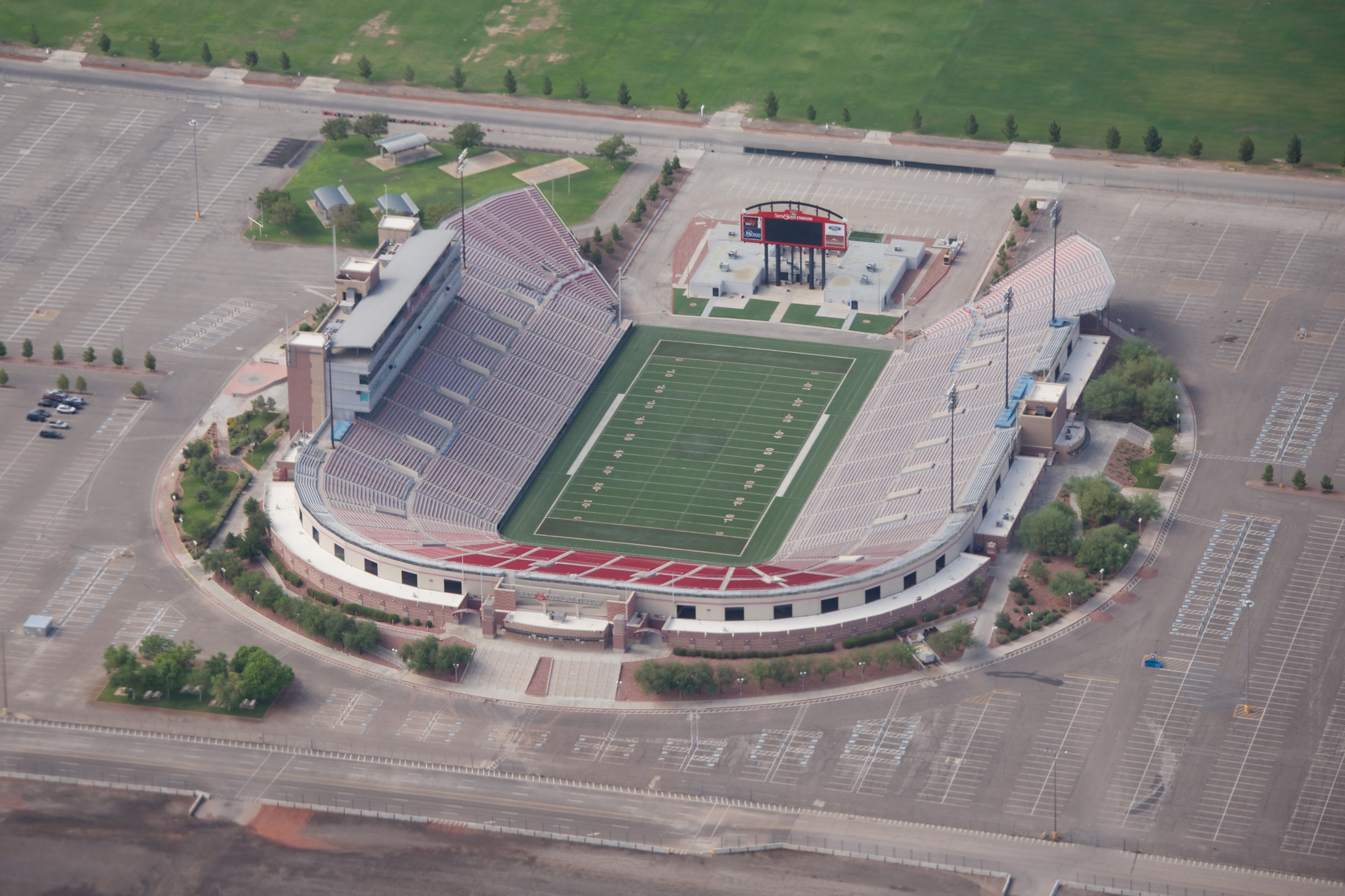
Sam Boyd Stadium in Whitney, Nevada, hosted the Las Vegas Bowl.

The 2007 Pioneer PureVision Las Vegas Bowl was an NCAA-sanctioned Division I post-season college football bowl game between the UCLA Bruins and the Brigham Young University Cougars. The game was played on December 22, 2007, starting at 5 p.m. PST at 40,000-seat Sam Boyd Stadium in Whitney, Nevada, where the bowl has been played since 1992. It was televised on ESPN.

Starting in 2001, the Las Vegas Bowl featured a matchup of teams from the Mountain West Conference (MWC) and Pacific-10 Conference (Pac-10), with organizers having first choice of bowl-eligible teams from the MWC, and the fourth or fifth choice (alternating annually) of bowl-eligible teams from the Pac-10.

== Teams ==
This was the second meeting in the 2007 college football season between the UCLA Bruins and the BYU Cougars. In the first meeting on September 8, 2007, at the Rose Bowl Stadium, the Bruins avoided an upset in a tough game by beating the Cougars, 27–17. UCLA had control of the game in the first half, but BYU made it close in the third quarter. UCLA's pass defense was shaky, giving up 391 yards, and their own passing attack inconsistent, as Ben Olson, a quarterback who transferred from BYU to UCLA, completed only 13 of 28 passes for 126 yards.

On December 3, 2007, following the final regular season game against USC, Los Angeles papers and the Associated Press reported that UCLA Coach Karl Dorrell was fired during a meeting with athletic director Dan Guerrero. Dorrell was offered the choice, but decided not to coach in the Las Vegas Bowl. Defensive coordinator DeWayne Walker served as interim coach for the game.

== Game summary ==
The 2007 Las Vegas Bowl kicked off at Sam Boyd Stadium at 8:12 p.m. EST. UCLA won the coin toss and elected to kick off to BYU to begin the game.

With less than a minute to go in the first half the Cougars had opened up 17–6 lead. Instead of simply downing the ball, the Cougars ran a running play up the middle and RB Harvey Unga fumbled. The Bruins responded by punching the ball in the end zone on the final play of the half. In the second half with the Cougars leading 17–13, the defenses took over. Second-half scoring was limited to a 50-yard field goal by the Bruins' Kai Forbath in the fourth quarter. Forbath then attempted a 28-yarder at the end of the game, but it was blocked by Eathyn Manumaleuna to preserve the Cougars' victory.

Walker's defensive schemes kept the Bruins, who were without their two top quarterbacks and relied on McLeod Bethel-Thompson, in the game. The Bruins size and strength advantage allowed them to dominate the line of scrimmage on both sides of the ball. Ball control was also key: Chris Markey rushed for 117 yards, the most by any BYU opponent in the 2007 season.

Scoring summary

| Quarter | Time | Drive | | | Team | Scoring information | Score | |
| Quarter | Time | Plays | Yards | TOP | Team | Scoring information | UCLA | BYU |
|---|---|---|---|---|---|---|---|---|
| 1 | 08:12 | | 38 | 5:58 | UCLA | 22-yard field goal by Kai Forbath | 3 | 0 |
| 1 | 01:06 | | 51 | 2:26 | BYU | 29-yard field goal by Mitch Payne | 3 | 3 |
| 2 | 10:32 | | 14 | 0:07 | BYU | Austin Collie 40-yard touchdown reception from Max Hall, Mitch Payne kick good | 3 | 10 |
| 2 | 04:44 | | 32 | 3:13 | UCLA | 52-yard field goal by Kai Forbath | 6 | 10 |
| 2 | 01:03 | | 55 | 3:41 | BYU | Michael Reed 13-yard touchdown reception from Max Hall, Mitch Payne kick good | 6 | 17 |
| 2 | 00:00 | | 4 | 0:12 | UCLA | Brandon Breazell 4-yard touchdown reception from McLeod Bethel-Thompson, Kai Forbath kick good | 13 | 17 |
| 4 | 06:24 | | 14 | 3:50 | UCLA | 50-yard field goal by Kai Forbath | 16 | 17 |
| "TOP" = time of possession. For other American football terms, see Glossary of American football. | | | | | | | 17 | 16 |

== Additional notes ==
- The Cougars avenged a 27–17 loss to UCLA in a game played on September 8 at the Bruins' home field, the Rose Bowl in Pasadena, California.
- UCLA left this bowl game without naming a permanent head coach for the 2008 season; Karl Dorrell had been fired on December 4. Rumored candidates as of December 24 included Baltimore Ravens offensive coordinator Rick Neuheisel, Temple head coach Al Golden, and Walker. Oregon head coach Mike Bellotti and Tennessee Titans offensive coordinator Norm Chow had withdrawn their names from consideration.
- The Las Vegas Bowl was an advance sellout for the fifth year in a row.
- The Cougars ended the season with a 10-game winning streak, which after Hawaii's loss to Georgia in the Sugar Bowl became the longest winning streak in the country.
- UCLA later selected a former teammate of Dorrell, Rick Neuheisel, as his successor. DeWayne Walker was retained as the defensive coordinator.
- The UCLA Bruins under Neuheisel and BYU Cougars would meet again in the 2008 regular season at BYU, where the Cougars would defeat the Bruins 59–0. This was the worst loss the Bruins endured since a 76–0 defeat in the very first UCLA–USC rivalry football game (in the year 1929).

== See also ==
- List of college football post-season games that were rematches of regular season games
