= DeWayne Walker =

American gridiron football player and coach (born 1960)

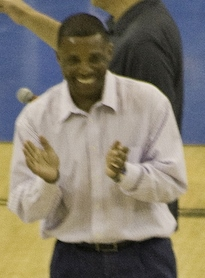
- Walker at UCLA in 2008

Arizona State Sun Devils
- Title: Special Advisor to the Head Coach

Personal information
- Born: December 3, 1960 (age 65); Los Angeles, California, U.S.

Career information
- High school: Pasadena (CA) John Muir
- College: Minnesota
- NFL draft: 1982: undrafted

Career history

Playing
- Edmonton Eskimos (1982); Oakland Invaders (1984); Arizona Outlaws (1985)

Coaching
- Mt. San Antonio (1988–1991) Defensive backs coach; Mt. San Antonio (1992) Defensive coordinator; Utah State (1993); BYU (1994) Cornerbacks coach; Oklahoma State (1995) Defensive coordinator; California (1996–1997) Defensive backs coach; New England Patriots (1998–2000) Defensive backs coach; USC (2001) Defensive backs coach; New York Giants (2002–2003) Defensive backs coach; Washington Redskins (2004–2005) Defensive backs coach; UCLA (2006–2008) Defensive coordinator; New Mexico State (2009–2012) Head coach; Jacksonville Jaguars (2013–2016) Defensive backs coach; Cleveland Browns (2017–2019) Defensive backs coach; Arizona (2021–2022) Cornerbacks coach; Arizona State (2023–2025) Analyst; Arizona State (2026-present) Special Advisor to the HC

Head coaching record
- Career: NCAA: 10–41 (.196)

DeWayne Morris Walker (born December 3, 1960) is an American gridiron football coach and former player. He is currently on the staff for the Arizona State Sun Devils football team. He previously served as the defensive backs coach of the Cleveland Browns of the National Football League (NFL). Walker played college football at the University of Minnesota and professionally in the Canadian Football League (CFL), with Edmonton Eskimos in 1982, and in the United States Football League (USFL), with the Oakland Invaders in 1984 and the Arizona Outlaws in 1985. Walker served as the head football coach at New Mexico State University from 2009 to 2012, compiling a record of 10–41 in four seasons.

== Early life and college ==
Born in Los Angeles, Walker graduated from John Muir High School of Pasadena, California in 1978. Walker attended and played for Pasadena City College for two years before transferring to the University of Minnesota, where he was a two-year starter.

In 1992, Walker completed his Bachelor of Arts in liberal arts at Regents College of the University of the State of New York (now Excelsior University).

== Professional playing career ==
Walker played for the Canadian Football League's Edmonton Eskimos in 1982 and the USFL's Oakland Invaders in 1984 and Arizona Outlaws in 1985.

== Coaching career ==
Walker was Pete Carroll's first hire once he became head coach of the USC Trojans in 2001; Walker oversaw the secondary and had spent the previous three seasons in a similar role with the New England Patriots. When Carroll hired Walker, he noted "He was with me [. . .] in the NFL, and he was able to learn my style and understand my system".

Between USC and coaching the UCLA Bruins, Walker was a secondary coach for the National Football League Washington Redskins and New York Giants. He has also coached for the New England Patriots and at Mount San Antonio College, Utah State, BYU, Oklahoma State and California.

=== UCLA Bruins ===
In December 2006, his defense held the rival USC Trojans under 10 points for the first time since 2001. It helped the Bruins end a seven-game losing streak in the UCLA–USC rivalry.

Following the dismissal of UCLA head coach Karl Dorrell in December 2007, Walker was asked to be the head coach of the Bruins in the 2007 Las Vegas Bowl. Dorrell was offered the opportunity to coach a final game, but declined. The Bruins faced Mountain West Conference champion Brigham Young University, a team they defeated earlier in the season. BYU beat UCLA 17–16 when BYU Cougars defensive lineman Eathyn Manumaleuna blocked a 28-yard field goal as time expired. This left Walker with a 0–1 record as head coach.

After the Las Vegas bowl game, speculations arose on whether Walker would return to the program. Among others, he received an offer to replace Kent Baer as defensive coordinator at the University of Washington. On January 1, 2008, Sporting News columnist Tom Dienhart reported that Walker had accepted the offer. The story, however, turned out to be untrue, as Los Angeles Times reporter Chris Foster reported that Walker would stay at UCLA and remain defensive coordinator for the Bruins. The Sporting News later retracted the story. Walker interviewed for the UCLA Bruin head coaching position and was one of the leading candidates for the position along with Rick Neuheisel, Al Golden of Temple, and Norm Chow. The job eventually went to Neuheisel and Walker remained as defensive coordinator.

=== New Mexico State ===
On December 31, 2008, Walker was named head coach at New Mexico State University. Walker became the second African-American coach in school history and the seventh African-American FBS coach at that time. He resigned as head coach after the 2012 season.

=== Jacksonville Jaguars ===
On January 22, 2013, it was reported that Walker would leave New Mexico State in favor of the defensive backs job with the Jacksonville Jaguars.

== Head coaching record ==
Year	Team	Overall	Conference	Standing	Bowl/playoffs
UCLA Bruins (Pacific-10 Conference) (2007)
2007	UCLA	0–1			L Las Vegas
UCLA:		0–1			
New Mexico State Aggies (Western Athletic Conference) (2009–2012)
2009	New Mexico State	3–10	1–7	T–8th	
2010	New Mexico State	2–10	1–7	8th	
2011	New Mexico State	4–9	2–5	7th	
2012	New Mexico State	1–11	0–6	7th	
New Mexico State:		10–40	4–25		
Total:		10–41			
