= Pac-12 Conference baseball tournament =

- Sport: Baseball
- Conference: Pac-12 Conference
- Number of teams: 9
- Format: Pool Play & Single Elimination
- Current stadium: Scottsdale Stadium
- Current location: Scottsdale, Arizona
- Played: 2022
- Last contest: 2024
- Current Champion: Arizona (1)
- Most championships: Arizona, Oregon & Stanford (1)
- TV partner(s): Pac-12 Network; ESPN2

Sponsors
- Gatorade; GEICO; Jockey; New York Life; Pacific Premier Bank; TicketSmarter; REPREVE; Paycor

Host stadiums
- Scottsdale Stadium (2022−2024); Goss Stadium at Coleman Field (2027-)

Host locations
- Scottsdale, Arizona (2022−2024); Goss Stadium at Coleman Field (2027-)

The Pac-12 Conference baseball tournament is the currently dormant conference tournament in baseball for the Pac-12 Conference. It was most recently played in 2024 as a pool-play tournament with a four-team knockout bracket, and seeding is based on Pac-12 regular season standings. The winner receives the conference's automatic bid to the NCAA Division I baseball tournament.

The Pac-12 was one of the few conferences to not host a conference tournament at the end of the regular season. After several years of consideration, the tournament began in 2022.

After the 2024 season, the Pac-12 lost 10 of its 12 full members to other power conferences, leaving Oregon State and Washington State as the only members. The conference will resume full operation in the 2026–27 school year with nine full members, six of which sponsor baseball, plus incoming affiliate member Dallas Baptist. The conference tournament will resume in 2027 with the tournament scheduled to held at Goss Stadium at Coleman Field, home of the Oregon State Beavers.

== Tournament ==
The Pac-12 Baseball tournament was most recently a pool-play tournament with a four-team knockout bracket, which was held at Scottsdale Stadium in Scottsdale, Arizona from 2022 to 2024. In 2023 and 2024, nine of the 11 Pac-12 schools which field baseball teams qualified for the tournament. (Colorado does not field a team). The winner earned the Pac-12's guaranteed bid to the NCAA Tournament.

On October 20, 2022 the Pac-12 announced it would change the format from a double-elimination tournament by expanding the field to nine teams & switching to pool play. There are three teams in each pool, with each team playing two games in pool play. Pool play takes place on Tuesday, Wednesday and Thursday, with three games per day. Each pool plays a round-robin. The three pool winners advance to the Friday single-elimination semifinals along with one Wild Card team. The Wild Card is determined by the best record of the non-advancing teams. Any tiebreaker is awarded to the highest seeded team. The semifinal matchups pit the highest seed team against the lowest seeded team on one side with the second highest seed and second lowest seed on the other. Teams from the same pool however do not play each other in the semifinals.

Pool A includes seeds #1, #6 and #9 with Pool B made up of seeds #2, #5, and #8. Seeds #3, #4 and #7 compete in Pool C. With every team in the tournament guaranteed two games, teams advancing to Saturday's title game play four games.

== Champions ==
| Year | School | Site | MVP |
|---|---|---|---|
| 2022 | Stanford | Scottsdale Stadium • Scottsdale, Arizona | Garret Forrester, Oregon State |
| 2023 | Oregon | Scottsdale Stadium • Scottsdale, Arizona | Chase Davis, Arizona |
| 2024 | Arizona | Scottsdale Stadium • Scottsdale, Arizona | Mason White, Arizona |

=== By school ===
| School | Championships | Years |
|---|---|---|
| Oregon | 1 | 2023 |
| Stanford | 1 | 2022 |
| Arizona | 1 | 2024 |
| Arizona State | 0 | |
| California | 0 | |
| Oregon State | 0 | |
| UCLA | 0 | |
| USC | 0 | |
| Utah | 0 | |
| Washington | 0 | |
| Washington State | 0 | |
