= Cincinnati–West Virginia rivalry =

American college sports rivalry

- Cincinnati Bearcats West Virginia Mountaineers
- Sport: Football, basketball, others
- First meeting: 1921

Locations of Cincinnati and West Virginia

The Cincinnati–West Virginia rivalry is a college sports rivalry between the University of Cincinnati Bearcats and West Virginia University Mountaineers, which are about 300 miles (480 km) apart. The rivalry dates from their first college football game in 1921, and has continued across all sports, including basketball since 1940. The rivalry intensified while the two schools were conference foes and members of the Big East Conference.

== History ==
College Comparison
	Cincinnati	West Virginia
Founded	1819	1867
Type	Public	Public
Location	Cincinnati, OH	Morgantown, WV
Conference	Big 12	Big 12
Students	44,338	29,933
School colors		
Nickname	Bearcats	Mountaineers
Stadium	Nippert Stadium	Milan Puskar Stadium
Arena	Fifth Third Arena	WVU Coliseum

The schools resumed the rivalry in 2023, while they had not played since West Virginia left the Big East for the Big 12 in 2012. Cincinnati remained in the Big East, which became the American Athletic Conference in 2013. Cincinnati was later invited on September 10, 2021, into the Big 12 Conference, starting in 2023–24 season.

In men's basketball both Gale Catlett and Bob Huggins were successful head coaches at both institutions.

== Football ==
Cincinnati–West Virginia football rivalry
- Cincinnati Bearcats West Virginia Mountaineers
- Sport: Football
- First meeting: October 1, 1921; West Virginia, 50–0
- Latest meeting: October 17, 2026; West Virginia, 45–42
- Next meeting: 2027

Statistics
- Total meetings: 23
- All-time series: West Virginia leads, 19–3–1
- Largest victory: West Virginia, 69–3
- Longest unbeaten streak: West Virginia, 7 (1969–2002)
- Current unbeaten streak: West Virginia, 5 (2010–present)

=== Notable games ===
November 17, 2007: West Virginia had momentum as the No. 5 ranked team in the nation, and Cincinnati was ranked No. 21 after back-to-back wins against ranked opponents No. 20 USF and No. 16 Connecticut. West Virginia was able to hold on for a victory by defeating No. 21 Cincinnati 28–23 to keep its Big East title hopes alive.

November 13, 2009: Cincinnati was undefeated with a 9–0 record and ranked No. 5, the Bearcats seeking a second consecutive Big East Championship. West Virginia was ranked No. 23. Cincinnati would hold off the Mountaineers to remain undefeated, beating West Virginia 24–21, which helped propel Cincinnati to the 2010 Sugar Bowl.

=== Game results ===
Rankings are from the AP Poll (1936–present), CFP Poll (2014–present)

Cincinnati victories	West Virginia victories	Tie games

No.	Date	Location	Winner	Score
1	October 1, 1921	Morgantown, WV	West Virginia	50–0
2	November 4, 1922	Cincinnati, OH	West Virginia	34–0
3	September 26, 1936	Cincinnati, OH	West Virginia	40–6
4	October 14, 1939	Cincinnati, OH	West Virginia	7–0
5	November 9, 1940	Morgantown, WV	Tie	7–7
6	September 13, 1969	Morgantown, WV	West Virginia	57–11
7	September 6, 1980	Morgantown, WV	West Virginia	41–27
8	October 17, 1987	Morgantown, WV	West Virginia	45–17
9	November 5, 1988	Cincinnati, OH	#4 West Virginia	51–13
10	October 21, 1989	Morgantown, WV	#18 West Virginia	69–3
11	October 17, 1990	Morgantown, WV	West Virginia	28–20
12	September 14, 2002	Cincinnati, OH	West Virginia	35–32

No.	Date	Location	Winner	Score
13	September 13, 2003	Morgantown, WV	Cincinnati	15–13
14	November 9, 2005	Cincinnati, OH	#14 West Virginia	38–0
15	November 11, 2006	Morgantown, WV	#10 West Virginia	42–24
16	November 17, 2007	Cincinnati, OH	#5 West Virginia	28–23
17	November 8, 2008	Morgantown, WV	Cincinnati	26–23 ^{OT}
18	November 13, 2009	Cincinnati, OH	#5 Cincinnati	24–21
19	November 13, 2010	Morgantown, WV	West Virginia	37–10
20	November 12, 2011	Cincinnati, OH	West Virginia	24–21
21	November 18, 2023	Morgantown, WV	West Virginia	42–21
22	November 9, 2024	Cincinnati, OH	West Virginia	31–24
23	October 17, 2026	Morgantown, WV	West Virginia	45–42
Series: West Virginia leads 19–3–1

== Men's basketball ==
Cincinnati–West Virginia men's basketball rivalry
- Cincinnati Bearcats West Virginia Mountaineers
- Sport: Basketball
- First meeting: January 17, 1941; West Virginia, 47–43
- Latest meeting: February 5, 2026; West Virginia, 59–54

Statistics
- Total meetings: 27
- All-time series: West Virginia, 15–12
- Longest win streak: Cincinnati, 5 (January 19, 1950 – January 24, 1979)
- Current win streak: West Virginia, 4 (February 2, 2025 – present)

=== Notable games ===
March 14, 1998: In the round of 32 of the 1998 NCAA tournament #2 Seed Cincinnati would take the lead with 7.1 seconds remaining in the second half before the #10 Seed Mountaineers stormed back down the court and took the lead back with their own 3-point shot, upsetting the Bearcats 75–74.

January 30, 2008: In his first game at West Virginia facing his former school, Bob Huggins lost to his former assistant coach Mick Cronin as Cincinnati beat the Mountaineers 62–39 in Morgantown.

=== Game results ===
Rankings are from the AP Poll (1936–present)

Cincinnati victories	West Virginia victories	Tie games

No.	Date	Location	Winner	Score
1	January 21, 1941	Cincinnati, OH	West Virginia	47–43
2	February 15, 1941	Morgantown, WV	West Virginia	55–36
3	January 1, 1949	Cincinnati, OH	Cincinnati	72–62
4	January 29, 1949	Morgantown, WV	West Virginia	81–63
5	January 19, 1950	Cincinnati, OH	No. 20 Cincinnati	69–59
6	February 11, 1950	Morgantown, WV	Cincinnati	69–64^{2OT}
7	February 23, 1976	Cincinnati, OH	No. 18 Cincinnati	66–56
8	February 24, 1978	Cincinnati, OH	No. 18 Cincinnati	96–80
9	January 24, 1979	Morgantown, WV	Cincinnati	79–65
10	March 14, 1998^{A}	Boise, ID	West Virginia	75–74
11	February 4, 2006	Morgantown, WV	No. 11 West Virginia	66–57
12	March 4, 2006	Cincinnati, OH	Cincinnati	78–75
13	January 20, 2007	Cincinnati, OH	Cincinnati	96–83^{OT}
14	March 3, 2007	Morgantown, WV	West Virginia	79–65
15	January 30, 2008	Morgantown, WV	Cincinnati	62–39
16	February 26, 2009	Cincinnati, OH	Cincinnati	65–61
17	February 27, 2010	Morgantown, WV	No. 8 West Virginia	74–68
18	March 11, 2010^{B}	New York, NY	No. 7 West Virginia	54–51
19	January 29, 2011	Cincinnati, OH	West Virginia	66–55
20	January 21, 2012	Morgantown, WV	West Virginia	77–74^{OT}
21	January 31, 2024	Morgantown, WV	West Virginia	69–65
22	March 9, 2024	Cincinnati, OH	Cincinnati	92–56
23	March 12, 2024^{C}	Kansas City, MO	Cincinnati	90–85
24	February 2, 2025	Cincinnati, OH	West Virginia	63–50
25	February 19, 2025	Morgantown, WV	West Virginia	62–59
26	January 6, 2026	Morgantown, WV	West Virginia	62–60
27	February 5, 2026	Cincinnati, OH	West Virginia	59–54
Series: West Virginia leads 15–12

==== Notes ====
^{A}1998 NCAA Round of 32
^{B}2010 Big East men's basketball tournament
^{C}2024 Big 12 men's basketball tournament

== See also ==
- List of NCAA college football rivalry games
