= 2007 Backyard Brawl =

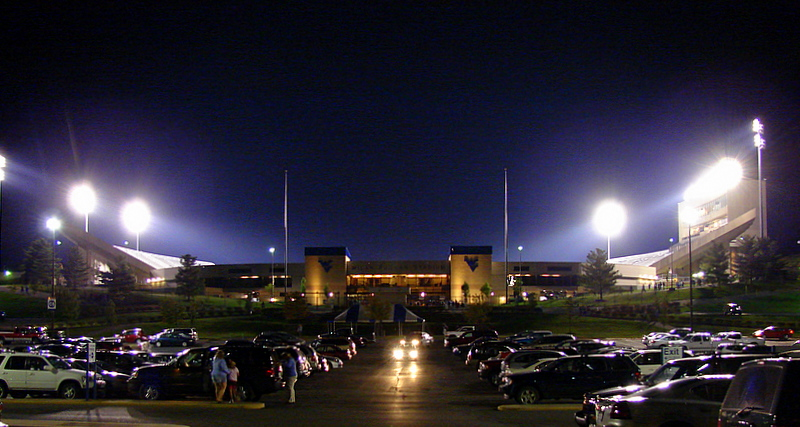
- The game was played at Milan Puskar Stadium in Morgantown, West Virginia
Pittsburgh Panthers	West Virginia Mountaineers
(4–7)	(10–1)
13	9
Head coach: Dave Wannstedt	Head coach: Rich Rodriguez
	AP / Coaches / BCS; 2 / 1 / 2
	1	2	3	4	Total
Pittsburgh	0	3	7	3	13
West Virginia	0	7	0	2	9
- Date: December 1, 2007
- Season: 2007
- Stadium: Mountaineer Field at Milan Puskar Stadium
- Location: Morgantown, West Virginia
- Favorite: West Virginia by 28
- Attendance: 60,100

United States TV coverage
- Network: ESPN
- Announcers: Mike Patrick, Todd Blackledge and Holly Rowe

The 2007 Pittsburgh vs. West Virginia football game, commonly nicknamed "13–9", was a college football game held in Morgantown, West Virginia that marked the 100th Backyard Brawl. Unranked and 4–7 Pittsburgh, a 28½ point underdog, pulled a major upset over archrival West Virginia which, coming into the game, was ranked second in the Bowl Championship Series (BCS) standings and AP poll and first in the Coaches Poll. By upsetting West Virginia in the Mountaineers' regular season and home finale, the Panthers knocked West Virginia out of what had been assured to be their first appearance in a BCS National Championship Game and a shot at their first national championship. The game was one of the most important Backyard Brawls in the series history, one of the biggest upsets in both Pittsburgh and West Virginia history, one of the biggest upsets of the season, and was voted as the "Game of the Year" by ESPNU.

== Game summary ==
The Mountaineers could never get their high-powered offense going against the Panthers and were hurt by fumbles, missed field goals, and an injury to star quarterback Pat White, who missed most of the game after dislocating his thumb in the second quarter. Trailing by one possession late in the fourth quarter, West Virginia twice had the ball in Pitt territory. Despite White's return, the Mountaineers both times failed to convert on fourth down plays. The final Pitt possession saw the underdogs run the ball out of the back of the end zone for an intentional safety as time expired. West Virginia's kicker Pat McAfee missed two field goals in the game and Pitt's kicker Conor Lee missed one.

=== Scoring ===
==== Second quarter ====
- WVU – Jarrett Brown 6 Yd Run (Pat McAfee kick) WVU 7–0
- PITT – Conor Lee 48 Yd field goal WVU 7–3

==== Third quarter ====
- PITT – Pat Bostick 1 Yd Run (Conor Lee kick) PITT 10–7

==== Fourth quarter ====
- PITT – Conor Lee 18 Yd field goal PITT 13–7
- WVU – Ball Through End Zone PITT 13–9

== Aftermath ==
At Pitt's campus in Pittsburgh, large numbers of students began forming in different locations of the Oakland neighborhood. In addition to the crowds, a sofa chair was burned in front of the university's Cathedral of Learning, mocking the WVU tradition of burning couches after big wins. When interviewed in 2017 for an SB Nation 10-year retrospective on the 2007 college football season as a whole, Owen Schmitt, fullback for the 2007 WVU team, apparently still had problems coming to grips with the result, telling the reporter, "And then you get to the fucking last game of the season and blow it against the shittiest fucking team in the fucking world."

Several football recruits that were visiting West Virginia for the game ended up cheering with the Panthers on their sideline by the end of the game. Several of them later decided to play for Pitt over West Virginia. The game was briefly seen as a turning point in Coach Dave Wannstedt's early tenure at Pitt, during which he had struggled and seemingly stagnated. However, Wannstedt resigned following the 2010 regular season. The trickle-down effect of West Virginia being knocked out of the BCS Championship has been speculated to have had a major impact on the bowl placement of many teams and the filling of various head-coaching positions. Most prominently affected was LSU, who slid into WVU's slot and ended up winning the BCS Championship.

The game turned out to have a profound impact on the future of Michigan, which was in the midst of a search to replace retiring coach Lloyd Carr. Two weeks after the loss, Michigan hired Mountaineers coach Rich Rodriguez as Carr's successor. Had West Virginia beaten Pitt, Rodriguez likely would not have left West Virginia and passed up the chance to play for a BCS National Championship, and Michigan would have had to look elsewhere for its coach.

The game was named as the "Game of the Year" by ESPNU and other publications. It was also the first time the Panthers defeated a 2nd-ranked opponent since their 24–20 win over Georgia in the 1982 Sugar Bowl.

West Virginia's season ended on a positive note, however, as it was elected to play in the Fiesta Bowl against the Oklahoma Sooners. The Mountaineers avenged their devastating loss to Pitt with a convincing 48–28 win over the 3rd-ranked Sooners.

Along with #1 Missouri's loss in the Big 12 Championship Game to Oklahoma, West Virginia's loss to Pitt represented the second straight week that both the #1 and #2 teams lost. It was the first time it had happened in consecutive weekends. As a result, Ohio State, who was idle the last 2 weeks, and LSU, who won the SEC Championship Game over Tennessee despite two overtime losses in the regular season, were selected to play in the BCS National Championship Game, with the Tigers winning 38–24.

The teams met again the next season in Pittsburgh, as was usual as the rivalry was an annual one at the time. Pittsburgh again won, this time 19–15, and the teams ended with identical 9–4 records. In 2009, the teams met in Morgantown for the first time since the upset with West Virginia winning 19–16. They met 2 more times in 2010 and 2011, with the Mountaineers winning each of them. With both the Panthers joining the ACC and the Mountaineers joining the Big 12 in 2012, the series was in doubt. In 2015, the two schools agreed to play a 4-game series from 2022 to 2025.

== See also ==
- Year of the Upset and "The Curse of No. 2"
- Backyard Brawl (Pittsburgh–West Virginia football rivalry)
- List of nicknamed college football games and plays
