= 2007 Pittsburgh Panthers football team =

American college football season

2007 Pittsburgh Panthers football
- Conference: Big East Conference
- Record: 5–7 (3–4 Big East)
- Head coach: Dave Wannstedt (3rd season)
- Offensive coordinator: Matt Cavanaugh (3rd season)
- Offensive scheme: Pro-style
- Defensive coordinator: Paul Rhoads (8th season)
- Base defense: 4–3
- Home stadium: Heinz Field

2007 Big East Conference football standings
	Conf.			Overall
Team	W		L	W		L
No. 6 West Virginia $+	5	–	2	11	–	2
Connecticut +	5	–	2	9	–	4
No. 17 Cincinnati	4	–	3	10	–	3
South Florida	4	–	3	9	–	4
Rutgers	3	–	4	8	–	5
Louisville	3	–	4	6	–	6
Pittsburgh	3	–	4	5	–	7
Syracuse	1	–	6	2	–	10
$ – BCS representative as conference champion; + – Conference co-champions; Rankings from AP Poll

The 2007 Pittsburgh Panthers football team represented the University of Pittsburgh in the 2007 NCAA Division I FBS football season. The biggest win of the season took place on December 1 when Pittsburgh defeated rival No. 2 West Virginia, 13–9.

== Schedule ==
Date	Time	Opponent	Site	TV	Result	Attendance	Source
September 1	6:00 p.m.	Eastern Michigan*	Heinz Field; Pittsburgh, PA		W 27–3	36,183	
September 8	12:00 p.m.	Grambling State*	Heinz Field; Pittsburgh, PA		W 34–10	30,852	
September 15	12:00 p.m.	at Michigan State*	Spartan Stadium; East Lansing, MI	ESPN	L 13–17	68,620	
September 22	7:00 p.m.	Connecticut	Heinz Field; Pittsburgh, PA	ESPNU	L 14–34	40,145	
September 29	7:00 p.m.	at Virginia*	Scott Stadium; Charlottesville, VA	ESPNU	L 14–44	60,888	
October 10	8:00 p.m.	Navy*	Heinz Field; Pittsburgh, PA	ESPN	L 45–48 ^{2OT}	30,103	
October 20	12:00 p.m.	No. 23 Cincinnati^{†}	Heinz Field; Pittsburgh, PA (River City Rivalry)	ESPN Plus	W 24–17	33,423	
October 27	12:00 p.m.	at Louisville	Papa John's Cardinal Stadium; Louisville, KY	ESPN Plus	L 17–24	34,792	
November 3	12:00 p.m.	Syracuse	Heinz Field; Pittsburgh, PA (rivalry)	ESPN Plus	W 20–17	31,374	
November 17	12:00 p.m.	at Rutgers	Rutgers Stadium; Piscataway, NJ	ESPN Plus	L 16–20	43,531	
November 24	12:00 p.m.	South Florida	Heinz Field; Pittsburgh, PA	ESPN Plus	L 37–48	31,123	
December 1	7:45 p.m.	at No. 2 West Virginia	Mountaineer Field; Morgantown, WV (Backyard Brawl)	ESPN	W 13–9	60,100	
*Non-conference game; ^{†}Homecoming; Rankings from AP Poll released prior to the game; All times are in Eastern time

== Game summaries ==
=== Eastern Michigan ===
Team	1	2	3	4	Total
E. Michigan	3	0	0	0	3
• Pittsburgh	7	7	7	6	27

- Date: September 1
- Location: Heinz Field

=== Grambling State ===
Team	1	2	3	4	Total
Grambling St	7	3	0	0	10
• Pittsburgh	21	10	3	0	34

- Date: September 8
- Location: Heinz Field
- Game start: 12:00
- TV announcers (ESPN 360): Frank Giardina, John Gregory

=== Michigan State ===
Team	1	2	3	4	Total
Pittsburgh	0	7	3	3	13
• Michigan St	0	14	0	3	17

- Date: September 15
- Location: Spartan Stadium
- Game start: 12:00
- TV announcers (ESPN): Dave Pasch, Andre Ware, Quint Kessenich

=== Connecticut ===
Team	1	2	3	4	Total
• Connecticut	10	17	0	7	34
Pittsburgh	0	7	0	7	14

- Date: September 22
- Location: Heinz Field
- Game start: 7:00
- TV announcers (ESPNU): Dave Armstrong, Mike Gottfried

=== Virginia ===
Team	1	2	3	4	Total
Pittsburgh	0	7	0	7	14
• Virginia	27	3	0	14	44

- Date: September 29
- Location: Scott Stadium
- Game start: 7:00
- TV announcers (ESPNU): Dave Armstrong, Mike Gottfried, Graham Bensinger

=== Navy ===
Team	1	2	3	4	OT	2OT	Total
• Navy	7	14	14	3	7	3	48
Pittsburgh	7	14	10	7	7	0	45

- Date: October 10
- Location: Heinz Field
- Game start: 8:00
- TV announcers (ESPNU): Rece Davis, Lou Holtz, Mark May, Quint Kessenich

=== Cincinnati ===
Team	1	2	3	4	Total
Cincinnati	10	7	0	0	17
• Pittsburgh	3	7	3	11	24

- Date: October 20
- Location: Heinz Field
- Game start: Noon
- TV announcers (ESPN+): Dave Sims, John Congemi, Sarah Kustok

=== Louisville ===
Team	1	2	3	4	Total
Pittsburgh	0	7	0	10	17
• Louisville	7	7	3	7	24

- Date: October 27
- Location: Papa John's Cardinal Stadium
- Game start: Noon
- TV announcers (ESPN+): Dave Sims, John Congemi, Sarah Kustok

=== Syracuse ===
Team	1	2	3	4	Total
Syracuse	0	3	7	7	17
• Pittsburgh	0	10	0	10	20

- Date: November 3
- Location: Heinz Field
- Game start: Noon
- TV announcers (ESPN+): Dave Ryan, Jim Hofher, Sarah Kustok

=== Rutgers ===
Team	1	2	3	4	Total
Pittsburgh	10	0	3	3	16
• Rutgers	10	7	0	3	20

- Date: November 17
- Location: Rutgers Stadium
- Game start: Noon
- TV announcers (ESPN+): Dave Sims, John Congemi, Sarah Kustok

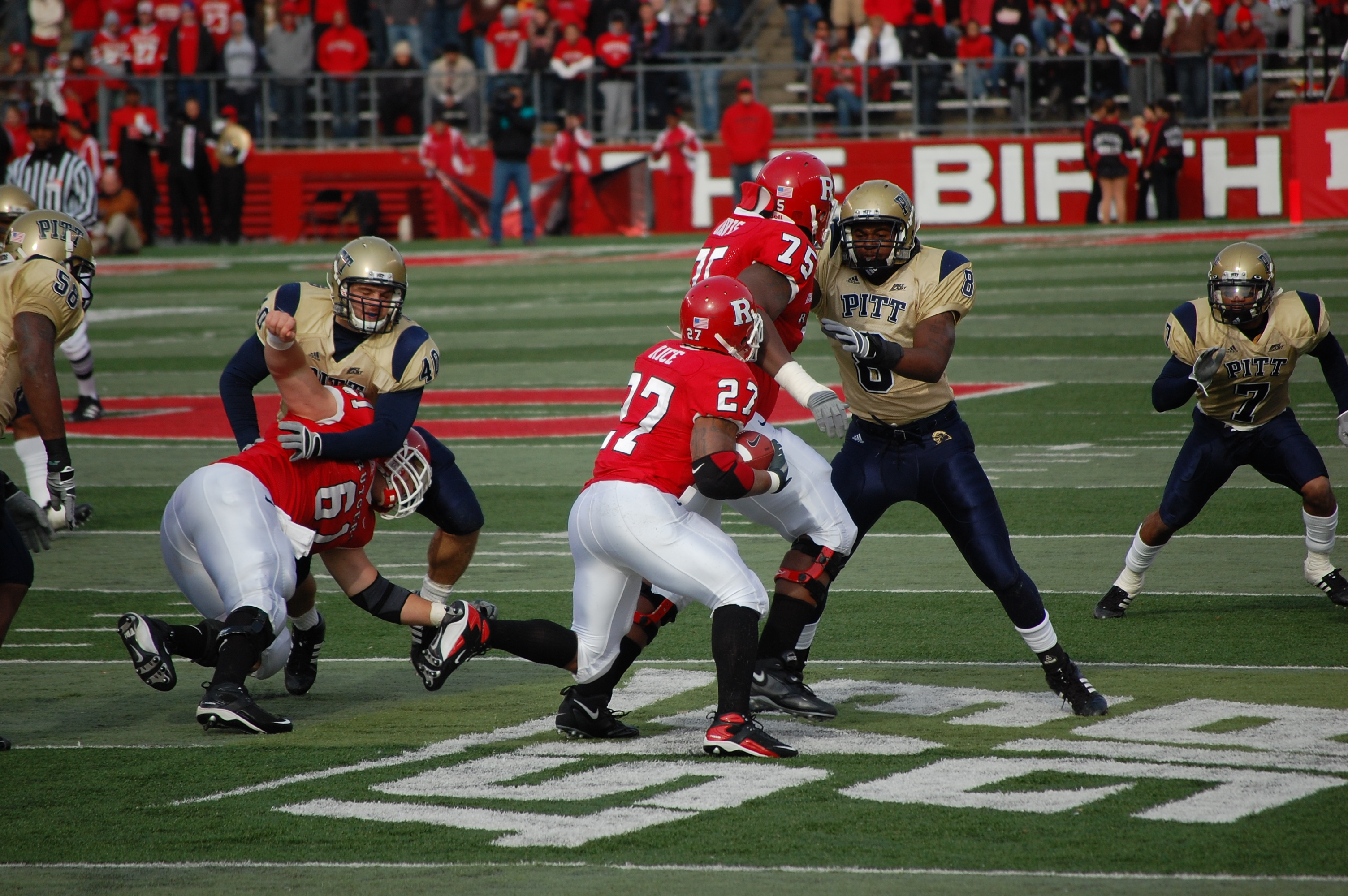
Pitt at Rutgers on November 17, 2007

=== South Florida ===
Team	1	2	3	4	Total
• South Florida	7	3	17	21	48
Pittsburgh	7	7	0	23	37

- Date: November 24
- Location: Heinz Field
- Game start: Noon
- TV announcers (ESPN+): Dave Sims, John Congemi, Sarah Kustok

=== West Virginia ===
Team	1	2	3	4	Total
• Pittsburgh	0	3	7	3	13
West Virginia	0	7	0	2	9

- Date: December 1
- Location: Milan Puskar Stadium
- Game start: 7:45 p.m. EST
- Game attendance: 60,100
- TV announcers (ESPN): Mike Patrick, Todd Blackledge, Holly Rowe

Scoring summary
Q2	1:43	WVU	Brown 6 yard run (McAfee kick)	WVU 7–0
Q2	:00	PITT	Lee 48 yard field goal	WVU 7–3
Q3	9:48	PITT	Bostick 1 yard run (Lee kick)	PITT 10–7
Q4	6:17	PITT	Lee 18 yard field goal	PITT 13–7
Q4	:00	WVU	Safety, Brytus runs out of end zone	PITT 13–9

== Coaching staff ==
2007 Pittsburgh Panthers football staff
Coaching staff: Dave Wannstedt – Head coach; Matt Cavanaugh – Offensive coordinator/quarterbacks; Paul Rhoads – Defensive coordinator/linebackers; Charlie Partridge – Linebackers/special teams; Brian Angelichio – Tight ends; Chris Ball – Secondary; Paul Dunn – Offensive line; Greg Gattuso – Defensive line; Aubrey Hill – Receivers; David Walker – Running backs	Support staff: Chris LaSala – Assistant Athletic Director/football operations; Bob Junko – Director of football operations and Program Enhancement; Joe Perri – Offensive graduate assistant/offensive line; Jeff Hafley – Defensive graduate assistant/Cornerbacks	Strength and conditioning staff: Buddy Morris – Strength and conditioning coach; James Smith – Assistant strength and conditioning coach

== Team players drafted into the NFL ==
Player	Position	Round	Pick	NFL club
Jeff Otah	Tackle	1	19	Carolina Panthers
Mike McGlynn	Tackle	4	109	Philadelphia Eagles
Kennard Cox	Defensive back	7	251	Buffalo Bills
