= 2007 West Virginia Mountaineers football team =

American college football season

2007 West Virginia Mountaineers football

Big East co-champion Fiesta Bowl champion Lambert-Meadowlands Trophy

Fiesta Bowl, W 48–28 vs. Oklahoma
- Conference: Big East Conference

Ranking
- Coaches: No. 6
- AP: No. 6
- Record: 11–2 (5–2 Big East)
- Head coach: Rich Rodriguez (7th season; regular season); Bill Stewart (interim; bowl game)
- Offensive coordinator: Calvin Magee (4th season)
- Offensive scheme: Spread option
- Defensive coordinator: Jeff Casteel (6th season)
- Base defense: 3–3–5
- Home stadium: Milan Puskar Stadium

2007 Big East Conference football standings
	Conf.			Overall
Team	W		L	W		L
No. 6 West Virginia $+	5	–	2	11	–	2
Connecticut +	5	–	2	9	–	4
No. 17 Cincinnati	4	–	3	10	–	3
South Florida	4	–	3	9	–	4
Rutgers	3	–	4	8	–	5
Louisville	3	–	4	6	–	6
Pittsburgh	3	–	4	5	–	7
Syracuse	1	–	6	2	–	10
$ – BCS representative as conference champion; + – Conference co-champions; Rankings from AP Poll

The 2007 West Virginia Mountaineers football team represented West Virginia University as a member of the Big East Conference during the 2007 NCAA Division I FBS football season. The Mountaineers compiled an overall record of 11–2 with a mark of 5–2 in conference play, sharing the Big East with Connecticut. West Virginia was invited the Fiesta Bowl, where the Mountaineers defeated No. 3-ranked Oklahoma. The Mountaineers were led during the regular season by Rich Rodriguez in his seventh and final season as head coach. On December 16, he announced that he was leaving West Virginia to become the head football coach at the University of Michigan. Assistant head coach Bill Stewart was appointed as interim head coach for the bowl game. The team played home games at Milan Puskar Stadium in Morgantown, West Virginia.

West Virginia rose to the No. 2 in the AP poll and the Bowl Championship Series (BCS) standings and No. 1 in the Coaches Poll of the 2007 NCAA Division I FBS football rankings before the team's season finale against Pittsburgh, which the Mountaineers lost 13–9, knocking them out of contention for the 2008 BCS National Championship Game. West Virginia won the Lambert-Meadowlands Trophy, awarded to the best college football team in the Eastern United States.

== Schedule ==
Date	Time	Opponent	Rank	Site	TV	Result	Attendance
September 1	3:30 p.m.	Western Michigan*	No. 3	Milan Puskar Stadium; Morgantown, WV	ESPN Plus	W 62–24	60,563
September 8	11:00 a.m.	at Marshall*	No. 3	Joan C. Edwards Stadium; Huntington, WV (Friends of Coal Bowl)	ESPN2	W 48–23	40,383
September 13	7:30 p.m.	at Maryland*	No. 4	Byrd Stadium; College Park, MD (rivalry)	ESPN	W 31–14	53,107
September 22	12:00 p.m.	East Carolina*	No. 5	Milan Puskar Stadium; Morgantown, WV	ESPN2	W 48–7	60,021
September 28	8:00 p.m.	at No. 18 South Florida	No. 5	Raymond James Stadium; Tampa, FL	ESPN2	L 13–21	67,018
October 6	12:00 p.m.	at Syracuse	No. 13	Carrier Dome; Syracuse, NY (rivalry)	ESPN Plus	W 55–14	35,345
October 20	3:30 p.m.	Mississippi State*^{†}	No. 9	Milan Puskar Stadium; Morgantown, WV	ESPN Plus	W 38–13	61,022
October 27	12:00 p.m.	at No. 25 Rutgers	No. 6	Rutgers Stadium; Piscataway, NJ	ABC	W 31–3	43,620
November 8	7:30 p.m.	Louisville	No. 6	Milan Puskar Stadium; Morgantown, WV (Gold Rush)	ESPN	W 38–31	60,992
November 17	7:45 p.m.	at No. 21 Cincinnati	No. 5	Nippert Stadium; Cincinnati, Ohio (rivalry)	ESPN	W 28–23	35,079
November 24	3:30 p.m.	No. 20 Connecticut	No. 4	Milan Puskar Stadium; Morgantown, WV	ABC	W 66–21	59,701
December 1	7:45 p.m.	Pittsburgh	No. 2	Milan Puskar Stadium; Morgantown, WV (Backyard Brawl)	ESPN	L 9–13	60,100
January 2, 2008	8:00 p.m.	vs. No. 3 Oklahoma*	No. 11	University of Phoenix Stadium; Glendale, AZ (Fiesta Bowl)	FOX	W 48–28	70,016
*Non-conference game; ^{†}Homecoming; Rankings from AP Poll released prior to game; All times are in Eastern time

== Rankings ==
Ranking movements Legend: ██ Increase in ranking ██ Decrease in ranking т = Tied with team above or below ( ) = First-place votes
	Week															
Poll	Pre	1	2	3	4	5	6	7	8	9	10	11	12	13	14	Final
AP	3 (1)	3 (1)	4	5	5	13	8	9	6	7	6	5 (1)	4 (1)	2 (20)	11	6
Coaches	6	4	4	5	5	12	9	7	6	7	6	5 (1)	3 (1)	1 (37)	9	6
Harris	Not released				5	11	8	8	6	7	6	5	3т	2 (45)	9	Not released
BCS	Not released							9	7	7	7	6	3	2	9	Not released

== Preseason ==
=== New uniforms ===
West Virginia unveiled a new gold uniform with blue stripes design for the season. The tops have been featured with both blue and gold bottoms. The uniform is currently being featured as the alternate home uniform. Running back Steve Slaton sported the uniform when he attended the 2007 Playboy All-American honoring at the Playboy Mansion at the beginning of the preseason wearing it with white bottoms.

=== Spring practice ===
West Virginia started spring practice on March 5. Mountaineer fans got an opportunity to get a first look at the 2007 football team during the annual Gold-Blue Game, which was held at Milan Puskar Stadium on Saturday, April 7 at 12:30 p.m.. The offense won the contest 58–30, with the only touchdown being a 46-yard pass from Adam Bednarik to Wes Lyons. Backup running back Eddie Davis produced the most impressive performance.

The major goals of spring practice were to improve the defense, find a solid backup for running back Steve Slaton, and work out the inexperienced class of receivers. The Mountaineers also needed to replace the center position, where All-American Dan Mozes left as a senior, and the guard position.

=== Recruiting class ===
The Mountaineers received 25 letters of intent on National Signing Day, February 7, 2007. Florida all-purpose back Noel Devine created some controversy when he reported to the news that he had chosen West Virginia over Alabama. But on National Signing Day, Devine never signed his letter of intent, saying that after having a talk with mentor Deion Sanders, he decided to wait to see his SAT scores. He was most likely going to pursue a prep school season, then return to the recruiting scene for 2008. Noel then received word he had passed his tests, and so signed his LOI to attend WVU. In the preseason, Devine was named one of the top 10 impact freshman for 2007. An additional recruit, LB Pat Lazear, was signed on February 16, 2007.

College recruiting
Name	Hometown	School	Height	Weight	40^{‡}	Commit date
Don Barclay; OL	Cranberry Township, Pennsylvania	Seneca Valley HS	6 ft 4 in (1.93 m)	285 lb (129 kg)	4.14	
Don Barclay; OL	Recruit ratings: Scout: Rivals: (75)					
Asa Chapman; DL	Orange, Virginia	Fork Union	6 ft 5 in (1.96 m)	360 lb (160 kg)	5.50	Feb 4, 2007
Asa Chapman; DL	Recruit ratings: Scout: Rivals: (60)					
Noel Devine; RB	North Fort Myers, Florida	North Fort Myers HS	5 ft 8 in (1.73 m)	185 lb (84 kg)	4.35	Mar 30, 2007
Noel Devine; RB	Recruit ratings: Scout: Rivals: (87)					
Sidney Glover; DB	Warren, Ohio	Warren G. Harding HS	5 ft 11 in (1.80 m)	215 lb (98 kg)	4.50	Dec 8, 2008
Sidney Glover; DB	Recruit ratings: Scout: Rivals: (79)					
Gino Gradkowski; OL	Pittsburgh, Pennsylvania	Seton-LaSalle HS	6 ft 2 in (1.88 m)	280 lb (130 kg)	5.20	Jun 24, 2006
Gino Gradkowski; OL	Recruit ratings: Scout: Rivals: (76)					
Andrew Harris; WR	St. Petersburg, Florida	St. Petersburg Catholic HS	6 ft 2 in (1.88 m)	185 lb (84 kg)	4.68	Sep 8, 2008
Andrew Harris; WR	Recruit ratings: Scout: Rivals: (40)					
Vincent Harris; LB	Cincinnati, Ohio	LaSalle HS	6 ft 2 in (1.88 m)	220 lb (100 kg)	4.50	Oct 6, 2006
Vincent Harris; LB	Recruit ratings: Scout: Rivals: (73)					
Brandon Hogan; Ath	Manassas, Virginia	Osbourn Senior HS	6 ft 0 in (1.83 m)	175 lb (79 kg)	4.30	Jun 15, 2006
Brandon Hogan; Ath	Recruit ratings: Scout: Rivals: (78)					
Will Johnson; LB	Centerville, Ohio	Centerville HS	6 ft 2 in (1.88 m)	200 lb (91 kg)	4.50	Jan 21, 2007
Will Johnson; LB	Recruit ratings: Scout: Rivals: (40)					
Terence Kerns; RB	Frederick, Maryland	Thomas Johnson HS	6 ft 1 in (1.85 m)	230 lb (100 kg)	4.46	Apr 12, 2006
Terence Kerns; RB	Recruit ratings: Scout: Rivals: (77)					
Derek Knight; DB	Detroit, Michigan	Renaissance HS	6 ft 0 in (1.83 m)	195 lb (88 kg)	4.55	Nov 8, 2006
Derek Knight; DB	Recruit ratings: Scout: Rivals: (73)					
Ellis Lankster; DB	Mobile, Alabama	Jones County JC	5 ft 10 in (1.78 m)	200 lb (91 kg)	N/A	Dec 10, 2006
Ellis Lankster; DB	Recruit ratings: Scout: Rivals: (N/A)					
Pat Lazear; LB	Bethesda, Maryland	Whitman HS, Wheaton HS	6 ft 0 in (1.83 m)	229 lb (104 kg)	4.66	Feb 16, 2007
Pat Lazear; LB	Recruit ratings: Scout: Rivals: (79)					
Junius Lewis; DL	Morgantown, West Virginia	Morgantown HS	6 ft 2 in (1.88 m)	250 lb (110 kg)	4.91	May 6, 2006
Junius Lewis; DL	Recruit ratings: Scout: Rivals: (73)					
Charles Matthews; WR	Solon, Ohio	Solon HS	5 ft 10 in (1.78 m)	170 lb (77 kg)	4.40	Feb 4, 2007
Charles Matthews; WR	Recruit ratings: Scout: Rivals: (69)					
Julian Miller; DE	Columbus, Ohio	Beechcroft HS	6 ft 5 in (1.96 m)	220 lb (100 kg)	4.65	Aug 29, 2006
Julian Miller; DE	Recruit ratings: Scout: Rivals: (73)					
Evan Rodriguez; DB	North Bergen, New Jersey	North Bergen HS	6 ft 3 in (1.91 m)	210 lb (95 kg)	4.55	Dec 11, 2006
Evan Rodriguez; DB	Recruit ratings: Scout: Rivals: (77)					
Charlie Russell; QB	Morgantown, West Virginia	Morgantown HS	6 ft 3 in (1.91 m)	210 lb (95 kg)	4.97	Mar 5, 2006
Charlie Russell; QB	Recruit ratings: Scout: Rivals: (78)					
Jock Sanders; Ath	St. Petersburg, Florida	St. Petersburg Catholic HS	5 ft 8 in (1.73 m)	185 lb (84 kg)	4.58	Sep 5, 2006
Jock Sanders; Ath	Recruit ratings: Scout: Rivals: (78)					
P.J. Shirdan; DB	Drexel Hill, Pennsylvania	Monsignor Bonner HS	6 ft 1 in (1.85 m)	190 lb (86 kg)	4.50	Aug 16, 2006
P.J. Shirdan; DB	Recruit ratings: Scout: Rivals: (40)					
Archie Sims; LB	Laurel, Mississippi	Jones County JC	6 ft 0 in (1.83 m)	215 lb (98 kg)	4.60	Feb 6, 2007
Archie Sims; LB	Recruit ratings: Scout: Rivals: (N/A)					
Eain Smith; DB	Miramar, Florida	Chaminade-Madonna HS	6 ft 0 in (1.83 m)	190 lb (86 kg)	4.53	Dec 10, 2006
Eain Smith; DB	Recruit ratings: Scout: Rivals: (73)					
Chad Snodgrass; OL	Cross Lanes, West Virginia	Nitro HS	6 ft 3 in (1.91 m)	290 lb (130 kg)	5.42	Jun 19, 2006
Chad Snodgrass; OL	Recruit ratings: Scout: Rivals: (40)					
Bradley Starks; QB	Unionville, Virginia	Orange County HS	6 ft 4 in (1.93 m)	190 lb (86 kg)	4.40	May 9, 2006
Bradley Starks; QB	Recruit ratings: Scout: Rivals: (76)					
Keith Tandy; DB	Hopkinsville, Kentucky	Christian County HS	5 ft 11 in (1.80 m)	185 lb (84 kg)	4.40	Nov 22, 2006
Keith Tandy; DB	Recruit ratings: Scout: Rivals: (64)					
Kendall Washington; DB	Canton, Ohio	St. Thomas Aquinas HS	6 ft 4 in (1.93 m)	195 lb (88 kg)	4.38	Dec 12, 2006
Kendall Washington; DB	Recruit ratings: Scout: Rivals: (77)					
Tony Wood; DB	Blakeslee, Pennsylvania	Lackawanna JC	6 ft 0 in (1.83 m)	180 lb (82 kg)	4.40	Nov 12, 2006
Tony Wood; DB	Recruit ratings: Scout: Rivals: (N/A)					
Overall recruit ranking: Scout: 25 Rivals: 36
‡ Refers to 40-yard dash; Note: In many cases, Scout, Rivals, 247Sports, On3, and ESPN may conflict in their listings of height, weight and 40 time.; In these cases, the average was taken. ESPN grades are on a 100-point scale.; Sources: "West Virginia Commit List for 2007". Rivals.; "Scout.com Football Recruiting". Scout.; "RecruitTracker 2007: West Virginia". ESPN.; "Scout.com Team Recruiting Rankings". Scout.; "2007 Team Ranking". Rivals.com.

== Game summaries ==
=== Western Michigan ===
	1	2	3	4	Total
Broncos	6	8	7	3	24
No. 3 Mountaineers	14	14	21	13	62

Statistics	WMU	WVU
First downs	18	25
Total yards	277	542
Rushing yards	32	316
Passing yards	261	227
Turnovers	3	2
Passing: comp–att–int	26–43–2	13–22–0

Team	Category	Player	Statistics
Western Michigan	Passing	Tim Hiller	16/25, 160 yards, 2 INT
Western Michigan	Rushing	Glenis Thompson	8 rushes, 23 yards
Western Michigan	Receiving	Jamarko Simmons	14 receptions, 144 yards, 2 TD
West Virginia	Passing	Pat White	10/18, 192 yards, 2 TD
West Virginia	Rushing	Steve Slaton	16 rushes, 109 yards, 3 TD
West Virginia	Receiving	Darius Reynaud	5 receptions, 92 yards

The Mountaineers put up the most points since 2001 against Rutgers (80–7 win) when they defeated the Broncos 62–24. Pat White put up two rushing (97 total yards) and two passing touchdowns (196 total yards) while Steve Slaton rushed for 109 yards and 3 touchdowns, while also catching a 58-yard touchdown pass from White. Freshman sensation Noel Devine scored his first touchdown of his career, while also rushing for 44 yards. Darius Reynaud had 92 yards receiving on 5 catches. The team wore traditional blue jerseys with gold pants.

=== At Marshall ===
	1	2	3	4	Total
No. 3 Mountaineers	6	0	21	21	48
Thundering Herd	3	10	10	0	23

Statistics	WVU	MRSH
First downs	27	17
Total yards	511	387
Rushing yards	362	121
Passing yards	155	281
Turnovers	0	1
Passing: comp–att–int	13–18–0	20–32–0

Team	Category	Player	Statistics
West Virginia	Passing	Pat White	13/18, 149 yards, 2 TD
West Virginia	Rushing	Steve Slaton	24 rushes, 146 yards, 2 TD
West Virginia	Receiving	Darius Reynaud	9 receptions, 134 yards, 2 TD
Marshall	Passing	Bernard Morris	19/29, 256 yards, 2 TD
Marshall	Rushing	Darius Marshall	11 rushes, 80 yards
Marshall	Receiving	Cody Slate	5 receptions, 82 yards, TD

The Mountaineers traveled to Huntington, for the first time in over 90 years and got off to a slow start in losing 13–6 at halftime, but Steve Slaton's two touchdowns and 146 yards helped the Mountaineers pull out the win to capture the Governors Trophy. Pat White went 13 of 18 for 149 yards and two touchdowns, also rushing for 125 yards and a score. Freshman Noel Devine rushed for a touchdown and 76 yards on only five carries as well. The team wore all white uniforms.

=== At Maryland ===
	1	2	3	4	Total
No. 4 Mountaineers	7	7	14	3	31
Terrapins	7	0	0	7	14

Statistics	WVU	MD
First downs	21	15
Total yards	448	269
Rushing yards	353	89
Passing yards	105	206
Turnovers	3	3
Passing: comp–att–int	8–13–0	16–24–2

Team	Category	Player	Statistics
West Virginia	Passing	Pat White	8/13, 95 yards
West Virginia	Rushing	Steve Slaton	26 rushes, 137 yards, 3 TD
West Virginia	Receiving	Darius Reynaud	4 receptions, 55 yards
Maryland	Passing	Jordan Steffy	16/23, 180 yards, TD, 2 INT
Maryland	Rushing	Keon Lattimore	21 rushes, 80 yards, TD
Maryland	Receiving	Darrius Heyward-Bey	3 receptions, 56 yards

Freshman running back Noel Devine stole the spotlight from Patrick White and Steve Slaton as he rushed for 136 yards on only 5 carries. Slaton rushed for 137 yards and 3 touchdowns, while White had an off day of 95 yards passing and one rushing touchdown. This marked the 4th straight win over rival Maryland. The team wore white jerseys and blue pants.

=== East Carolina ===
	1	2	3	4	Total
Pirates	0	0	0	7	7
No. 5 Mountaineers	10	17	14	7	48

Statistics	ECU	WVU
First downs	12	29
Total yards	160	599
Rushing yards	106	397
Passing yards	95	203
Turnovers	1	0
Passing: comp–att–int	9–18–1	22–25–0

Team	Category	Player	Statistics
East Carolina	Passing	Patrick Pinkney	7/14, 43 yards, INT
East Carolina	Rushing	Chris Johnson	14 rushes, 76 yards, TD
East Carolina	Receiving	Chris Johnson	3 receptions, 13 yards
West Virginia	Passing	Pat White	18/20, 181 yards, 2 TD
West Virginia	Rushing	Steve Slaton	18 rushes, 110 yards, TD
West Virginia	Receiving	Darius Reynaud	5 receptions, 54 yards, 2 TD

The Mountaineers had their most complete game of the season as they almost pitched a shutout. The Pirates scored with less than a minute left in the game against the second-team defense, but the Mountaineers only allowed 160 total yards on the day. Pat White went 18 for 20 (90% completion percentage set a school record) for 181 yards and two touchdowns and rushed for two more scores. Steve Slaton rushed for 110 yards and a touchdown, which tied a school record for most career rushing touchdowns (42). Darius Reynaud, who played with a shoulder injury, had two touchdown receptions and a 64-yard run. Linebacker Mortty Ivy helped the defense out with an interception and a forced fumble. The team wore all blue uniforms.

=== At No. 18 South Florida ===
	1	2	3	4	Total
No. 5 Mountaineers	0	3	3	7	13
No. 18 Bulls	7	7	7	0	21

Statistics	WVU	USF
First downs	21	13
Total yards	437	274
Rushing yards	188	139
Passing yards	266	150
Turnovers	6	4
Passing: comp–att–int	23–38–3	11–20–2

Team	Category	Player	Statistics
West Virginia	Passing	Jarrett Brown	11/20, 149 yards, TD, 2 INT
West Virginia	Rushing	Jarrett Brown	15 rushes, 61 yards
West Virginia	Receiving	Dorrell Jalloh	5 receptions, 87 yards
South Florida	Passing	Matt Grothe	11/20, 135 yards, TD, 2 INT
South Florida	Rushing	Jamar Taylor	15 rushes, 58 yards, TD
South Florida	Receiving	Carlton Mitchell	1 reception, 55 yards, TD

In front of an expected record-breaking crowd at Raymond James Stadium, the Mountaineers were defeated by the #18 South Florida Bulls. WVU committed 6 turnovers during the game and starting QB Pat White didn't play in the second half. The team wore all white.

=== At Syracuse ===
	1	2	3	4	Total
No. 13 Mountaineers	14	17	10	14	55
Orange	7	0	7	0	14

Statistics	WVU	SYR
First downs	25	11
Total yards	486	202
Rushing yards	251	94
Passing yards	235	121
Turnovers	0	3
Passing: comp–att–int	18–21–0	6–16–2

Team	Category	Player	Statistics
West Virginia	Passing	Pat White	12/15, 148 yards, TD
West Virginia	Rushing	Pat White	14 rushes, 89 yards, TD
West Virginia	Receiving	Steve Slaton	4 receptions, 51 yards
Syracuse	Passing	Andrew Robinson	5/15, 100 yards, TD, 2 INT
Syracuse	Rushing	Curtis Brinkley	18 rushes, 50 yards, TD
Syracuse	Receiving	Mike Williams	2 receptions, 72 yards, TD

The Mountaineers rebounded in a big way by trouncing the Orange to win the Ben Schwartzwalder Trophy despite losing quarterback Pat White to a chest muscle strain and running back Steve Slaton to only 69 yards rushing. The team wore traditional white jerseys with gold pants.

=== Mississippi State ===
	1	2	3	4	Total
Bulldogs	0	7	6	0	13
No. 9 Mountaineers	28	3	0	7	38

Statistics	MSST	WVU
First downs	12	15
Total yards	214	346
Rushing yards	45	262
Passing yards	192	84
Turnovers	3	1
Passing: comp–att–int	18–35–0	12–20–1

Team	Category	Player	Statistics
Mississippi State	Passing	Wesley Carroll	18/35, 169 yards
Mississippi State	Rushing	Anthony Dixon	20 rushes, 61 yards, TD
Mississippi State	Receiving	Tony Burks	6 receptions, 41 yards
West Virginia	Passing	Pat White	8/12, 61 yards, 2 TD, INT
West Virginia	Rushing	Steve Slaton	23 rushes, 127 yards, TD
West Virginia	Receiving	Steve Slaton	4 receptions, 36 yards

The Mountaineers jumped to an early 28–0 lead by the end of the 1st quarter and cruised to a 38–13 win. This marked the first game for the new gold jerseys, which were worn with blue pants.

=== At No. 25 Rutgers ===
	1	2	3	4	Total
No. 6 Mountaineers	7	10	7	7	31
No. 25 Scarlet Knights	0	3	0	0	3

Statistics	WVU	RUTG
First downs	15	20
Total yards	398	314
Rushing yards	254	183
Passing yards	149	131
Turnovers	0	4
Passing: comp–att–int	10–16–0	15–31–2

Team	Category	Player	Statistics
West Virginia	Passing	Pat White	10/16, 144 yards
West Virginia	Rushing	Pat White	22 rushes, 156 yards, TD
West Virginia	Receiving	Steve Slaton	1 reception, 51 yards
Rutgers	Passing	Mike Teel	14/30, 128 yards, 2 INT
Rutgers	Rushing	Ray Rice	30 rushes, 142 yards
Rutgers	Receiving	Tiquan Underwood	7 receptions, 59 yards

Rutgers was expected to perform well against West Virginia, since the Scarlet Knights had previously beaten #2 ranked South Florida. Steve Slaton led the way with 3 rushing touchdowns against #25(AP) Rutgers in WVU's 13th straight win over the Scarlet Knights. Ray Rice rushed for 142 yards breaking a Rutgers school record for most 100+ yard games. The team wore all white.

=== Louisville ===
	1	2	3	4	Total
Louisville	0	14	7	10	31
No. 6 Mountaineers	14	7	10	7	38

Statistics	LOU	WVU
First downs	24	17
Total yards	382	397
Rushing yards	37	216
Passing yards	373	183
Turnovers	5	3
Passing: comp–att–int	27–46–2	16–25–0

Team	Category	Player	Statistics
Louisville	Passing	Brian Brohm	27/46, 345 yards, 2 TD, 2 INT
Louisville	Rushing	George Stripling	12 rushes, 23 yards
Louisville	Receiving	George Stripling	8 receptions, 105 yards
West Virginia	Passing	Pat White	16/25, 181 yards, 2 TD
West Virginia	Rushing	Pat White	24 rushes, 147 yards, TD
West Virginia	Receiving	Darius Reynaud	6 receptions, 79 yards, 2 TD

By halftime West Virginia had a 21–14 lead. Louisville was able to take advantage of the Mountaineer's mistakes(WVU had 3 turnovers and 11 penalties for 116 yards) and were able to spark a comeback but West Virginia broke the 31–31 tie when Pat White ran for a 50 yd TD with a little over a minute to play. Brian Brohm was intercepted in the final seconds of the game ending Louisville's attempt to tie the game and send it into overtime. The team wore all gold uniforms, and most of the crowd also wore gold.

=== At No. 21 Cincinnati ===
	1	2	3	4	Total
No. 5 Mountaineers	7	14	0	7	28
No. 21 Bearcats	7	3	0	13	23

Statistics	WVU	CIN
First downs	24	17
Total yards	435	407
Rushing yards	295	84
Passing yards	140	350
Turnovers	3	3
Passing: comp–att–int	13–19–1	19–34–0

Team	Category	Player	Statistics
West Virginia	Passing	Pat White	13/19, 140 yards, INT
West Virginia	Rushing	Pat White	27 rushes, 155 yards, 2 TD
West Virginia	Receiving	Steve Slaton	3 receptions, 48 yards
Cincinnati	Passing	Ben Mauk	19/34, 323 yards, 2 TD
Cincinnati	Rushing	Ben Mauk	15 rushes, 52 yards
Cincinnati	Receiving	Marcus Barnett	10 receptions, 210 yards, 2 TD

For the second straight game West Virginia made a double-digit second-half lead interesting by coughing up the football. And for the second straight game the Mountaineers were able to hold on for a victory by defeating No. 21 Cincinnati 28–23 to keep its Big East title hopes alive. Pat White finished the game with 295 yards of total offense, rushing 27 times for 155 yards and two touchdowns and completing 13 of 19 passes for 140 yards. Sophomore safety Boogie Allen recovered a Cincinnati onside kick to save the Mountaineers' win. The team wore white jerseys and blue pants.

=== No. 20 Connecticut ===
	1	2	3	4	Total
No. 20 Huskies	7	7	0	7	21
No. 3 Mountaineers	14	10	21	21	66

Statistics	CONN	WVU
First downs	22	26
Total yards	392	624
Rushing yards	203	517
Passing yards	224	109
Turnovers	4	1
Passing: comp–att–int	18–34–0	9–13–1

Team	Category	Player	Statistics
Connecticut	Passing	Tyler Lorenzen	14/28, 151 yards, TD
Connecticut	Rushing	Donald Brown	22 rushes, 129 yards, TD
Connecticut	Receiving	Brad Kanuch	3 receptions, 63 yards, TD
West Virginia	Passing	Pat White	9/13, 107 yards, TD, INT
West Virginia	Rushing	Pat White	16 rushes, 186 yards, 2 TD
West Virginia	Receiving	Darius Reynaud	5 receptions, 76 yards, TD

West Virginia rushed for 517 yards(415 of which came in the second half) and clinched their 5th Big East title with 66–21 win over UConn. Pat White went 9/13 passing for 107 yards and a TD, as well as rushing for a season high 186 yards 16 on carries and 2 TDs. Freshman RB Noel Devine also added 118 yards on the ground with a TD. Steve Slaton also went over the 1,000 yard mark on the season for the 3rd straight year. The win clinched the Big East automatic Bowl Championship Series berth, and coupled with the previous day's upset over then #1 LSU by unranked Arkansas, as well as #2 Kansas' loss to #4 Missouri, put the Mountaineers in a position to play for a berth in National Championship game with a win over rival Pitt the next week. The team wore traditional blue jerseys and gold pants.

=== Pittsburgh ===
	1	2	3	4	Total
Panthers	0	3	7	3	13
No. 2 Mountaineers	0	7	0	2	9

Statistics	PITT	WVU
First downs	15	12
Total yards	225	183
Rushing yards	158	104
Passing yards	72	93
Turnovers	2	5
Passing: comp–att–int	10–19–2	9–16–0

Team	Category	Player	Statistics
Pittsburgh	Passing	Pat Bostick	10/19, 67 yards, 2 INT
Pittsburgh	Rushing	LeSean McCoy	38 rushes, 148 yards
Pittsburgh	Receiving	Oderick Turner	3 receptions, 29 yards
West Virginia	Passing	Pat White	5/10, 50 yards
West Virginia	Rushing	Pat White	14 rushes, 41 yards
West Virginia	Receiving	Darius Reynaud	3 receptions, 46 yards

WVU entered the game against Pitt as 28 point favorites to win the 100th Backyard Brawl and earn a berth in the BCS championship game. The Mountaineers, however, could never get their high-powered offense going against the Panthers and were hurt by fumbles, missed field goals, and ineffective performances by Steve Slaton and Pat White, the latter of whom missed part of the game with a thumb injury. Pittsburgh, starting their backup QB Pat Bostick, was equally ineffective at moving the ball outside of the play of LeSean McCoy. Trailing by one possession late in the fourth quarter, West Virginia twice had the ball in Pitt territory, with both drives ending in Pat White being stopped on downs. The final Pitt possession saw the Panthers run the ball out of the back of the end zone for a safety as the clock expired, ending WVU's National Championship hopes.

=== Vs. No. 3 Oklahoma (Fiesta Bowl) ===
	1	2	3	4	Total
No. 11 Mountaineers	6	14	14	14	48
No. 3 Sooners	0	6	9	13	28

Statistics	WVU	OKLA
First downs	17	25
Total yards	525	398
Rushing yards	349	176
Passing yards	176	222
Turnovers	0	1
Passing: comp–att–int	10–19–0	22–34–1

Team	Category	Player	Statistics
West Virginia	Passing	Pat White	10/19, 176 yards, 2 TD
West Virginia	Rushing	Pat White	20 rushes, 150 yards
West Virginia	Receiving	Noel Devine	2 receptions, 47 yards
Oklahoma	Passing	Sam Bradford	22/34, 245 yards, 2 TD, INT
Oklahoma	Rushing	Allen Patrick	14 rushes, 81 yards
Oklahoma	Receiving	Quentin Chaney	4 receptions, 129 yards, TD

WVU entered the game as seven-point underdogs to the #3 Oklahoma Sooners, who were thought by some to be the best team in the country. Former head coach Rich Rodriguez had recently taken the head coaching position at the University of Michigan, leaving West Virginia with interim head coach Bill Stewart. West Virginia halfback Steve Slaton was taken out of the game early on with a hamstring injury, leaving the Mountaineers with freshman Noel Devine. West Virginia scored early with two field goals by Pat McAfee to take the lead, 6–0, into the second quarter. Sam Bradford was intercepted by Mountaineer safety Quinton Andrews early on, but the Sooners bounced back with a field goal to make it 6–3. However, fullback Owen Schmitt led the Mountaineers to their first touchdown on a 57-yard run to make the score 13–3. Oklahoma returned with a field goal to make it 13–6, but West Virginia ended the first half with a pass from their star quarterback, Pat White to a wide-open Darius Reynaud for a 21-yard touchdown to make it 20–6 at halftime. Linebacker Reed Williams won the Defensive MVP award, while backup linebacker J.T. Thomas recorded 6 tackles.

Oklahoma came back in the second half early with a field goal, followed by a goal line touchdown run by Chris Brown. The Sooners went for a 2-point conversion after the touchdown, but Bradford's pass was incomplete, leaving the score at 20–15. The Mountaineers answered back with a 17-yard run by Noel Devine for the touchdown to put the Mountaineers up 27–15. The Mountaineers scored again to end the third quarter, this time on a 30-yard reverse run by Darius Reynaud, to put the Mountaineers up 34–15 going into the fourth quarter. The Sooners scored early again, off of a Bradford pass to Quentin Chaney, but yet again failed a 2-point conversion attempt. West Virginia continued to roll however, as White hooked up with receiver Tito Gonzales for a 79-yard touchdown pass to put the Mountaineers up 41–21. The pass was the longest play in West Virginia school bowl history. Oklahoma scored again on a Bradford pass, this time to Juaquin Iglesias, but this time kicked the extra point to make the score 41–28. The Mountaineers sealed the game with six minutes left on a 65-yard touchdown run by Noel Devine, his second score of the game.

The West Virginia Mountaineers totaled 349 rushing yards in the victory. Pat White totaled 176 yards and two touchdowns passing while rushing for 150 yards. Noel Devine rushed for 108 yards and two touchdowns on only 13 carries, while Owen Schmitt totaled 64 yards and a score on three carries. Sam Bradford recorded 242 yards, two touchdowns, and an interception passing for the Sooners. Allen Patrick rushed for 82 yards on 14 carries, while Chris Brown rushed for 50 yards and a score on 16 carries. Quentin Chaney grabbed 4 passes for 129 yards and a score while receiver Juaquin Iglesias returned seven kicks for 195 yards.
