= Mortty Ivy =

American football player (born 1986)

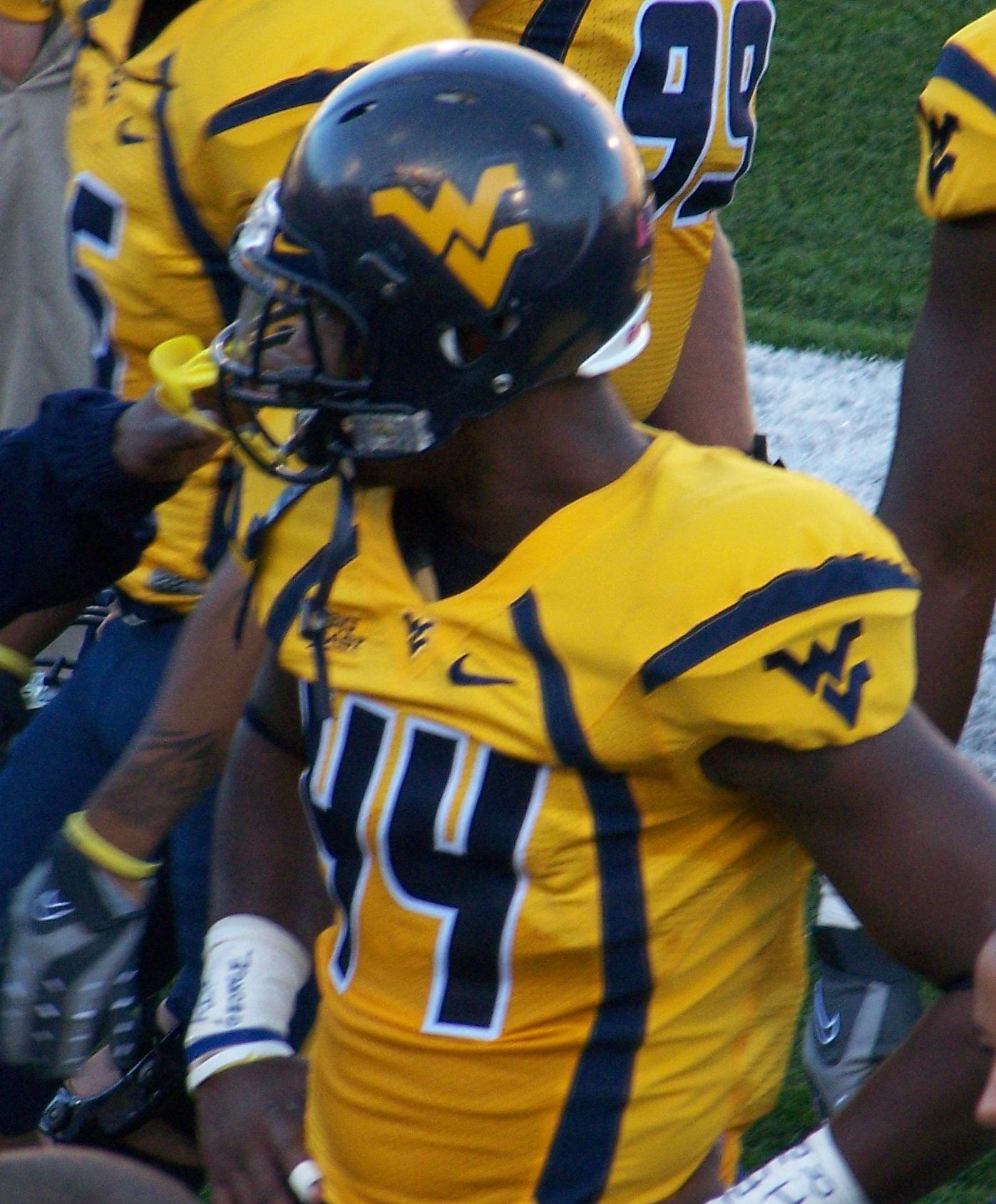
- Ivy during the homecoming game his junior season

No. 57
- Position: Linebacker

Personal information
- Born: April 26, 1986 (age 40); Monroeville, Pennsylvania, U.S.
- Listed height: 6 ft 1 in (1.85 m)
- Listed weight: 239 lb (108 kg)

Career information
- College: West Virginia
- NFL draft: 2009: undrafted

Career history
- Carolina Panthers (2009); St. Louis Rams (2010)*; Miami Dolphins (2010)*; Pittsburgh Steelers (2011); Saskatchewan Roughriders (2013–2015)
- * Offseason or practice squad member only

Awards and highlights
- First-team All-Big East (2008)

Career NFL statistics
- Total tackles: 1
- Stats at Pro Football Reference

Mortty Ivy (born April 26, 1986) is an American former professional football player who was a linebacker in the National Football League (NFL) and Canadian Football League (CFL). He played college football for the West Virginia Mountaineers.

Ivy was originally signed by the Carolina Panthers as an undrafted free agent in 2009. He subsequently spent time as a member of the St. Louis Rams, Miami Dolphins, and Pittsburgh Steelers.

== Early life ==
Ivy played quarterback in high school at Gateway High School. He accounted for over 2,000 yards as a senior and was named all-state in recognition of his contributions on the field. He was also a basketball letterman.

== College career ==
Ivy enrolled at West Virginia in 2004, spending the year as a redshirt.

As a redshirt-freshman in 2005, Ivy slotted behind starting middle linebacker Kevin "Boo" McLee. Ivy had three tackles and one for a loss in the win against Wofford and three stops against Maryland. He had four tackles in the loss to Virginia Tech and five in the overtime win against Louisville. He finished the season with five tackles against Cincinnati and six tackles against Pittsburgh. He recorded 44 tackles on the season.

An injury limited Ivy's participation in 2006, as he amassed 26 tackles on the season.

Ivy emerged as a starter in 2007. His first start came against Western Michigan, where he amassed a career-high 11 tackles, two sacks, and forced a fumble on the goal line that was recovered for a West Virginia touchdown, earning him the Big East Player of the Week honors. At the end of the regular season, he earned the team's Coaches Contribution Award. In the Fiesta Bowl victory over Oklahoma, Ivy recorded four tackles.

Ivy finished his junior season with 89 tackles, six sacks, one interception, three forced fumbles, and one fumble recovery for a touchdown. His forced fumbles led the team, while his tackles were second on the team, behind linebacker Reed Williams, and his sacks were third on the team.

During the early stages of spring practice in prior to the 2008 season, head coach Bill Stewart praised Ivy by saying, " thought he was great...I was about 10 feet away and I got out of the way. Man, he was hitting them. Mortty Ivy has had the spring of all springs." During the spring, Ivy moved from weakside linebacker to strongside.

In the first game of the season, a 48-21 victory over Villanova, Ivy recorded five tackles, a sack, an interception that he returned for a touchdown, and a fumble recovery that he returned for 30 yards. In the following 24-3 loss to East Carolina, he recorded nine tackles and a tackle for a loss. In the 35-13 win over Connecticut, he earned Big East Defensive Player of the Week honors with his 10 tackles and interception.

Ivy finished his season as a First-team All-Big East selection and WVU's Defensive Player of the Year selection - finishing the season with 90 tackles, seven tackles-for-a-loss, three interceptions, and a fumble recovery.

== Professional career ==
=== Pre-draft ===
Following the conclusion of his senior season at West Virginia University, Ivy played in the 2009 East-West Shrine Game for the East squad. He was also officially invited to the NFL Combine. However, he went unselected in the 2009 NFL draft.

=== Carolina Panthers ===
Following the draft Ivy signed a free agent contract with the Carolina Panthers and re-signed to the team's practice squad. He was promoted to the active roster after wide receiver Steve Smith was placed on injured reserve. He was waived by the team on September 4, 2010.

=== Pittsburgh Steelers ===
Ivy was signed on to the Pittsburgh Steelers' practice squad in 2011. He was signed to active roster on October 30.

Ivy was waived by the Steelers on August 27, 2012 due to injury.

=== Western PA Wildcatz ===
Ivy is currently playing for the Western PA Wildcatz in the Premier Amateur Football League, a semi-professional American football team based in Pittsburgh, Pa. The WPA Wildcatz are the 2016 national champions and ranked #1 in the country. They compete in AAA semi-pro football.
