= 2007 Rutgers Scarlet Knights football team =

American college football season

2007 Rutgers Scarlet Knights football
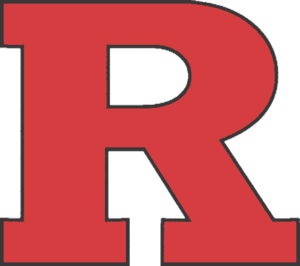

International Bowl champion

International Bowl, W 52–30 vs. Ball State
- Conference: Big East Conference
- Record: 8–5 (3–4 Big East)
- Head coach: Greg Schiano (7th season)
- Offensive coordinator: John McNulty (2nd season)
- Offensive scheme: Pro-style
- Base defense: 4–3
- Home stadium: Rutgers Stadium

2007 Big East Conference football standings
	Conf.			Overall
Team	W		L	W		L
No. 6 West Virginia $+	5	–	2	11	–	2
Connecticut +	5	–	2	9	–	4
No. 17 Cincinnati	4	–	3	10	–	3
South Florida	4	–	3	9	–	4
Rutgers	3	–	4	8	–	5
Louisville	3	–	4	6	–	6
Pittsburgh	3	–	4	5	–	7
Syracuse	1	–	6	2	–	10
$ – BCS representative as conference champion; + – Conference co-champions; Rankings from AP Poll

The 2007 Rutgers Scarlet Knights football team represented Rutgers University in the 2007 NCAA Division I FBS football season. The team was led by seventh-year head coach Greg Schiano.

For the first time in the history of Rutgers football, the team entered a season ranked—they were 16th in both the Associated Press and Coaches polls. The Scarlet Knights finished the season with an 8–5 record that included a 52–30 victory over the Ball State Cardinals in the 2008 International Bowl. It marked the third consecutive appearance of the team in a post-season bowl game, and the second bowl game won by the team.

== Schedule ==
Date	Time	Opponent	Rank	Site	TV	Result	Attendance	Source
August 30	7:00 pm	Buffalo*	No. 16	Rutgers Stadium; Piscataway, NJ	ESPN Plus	W 38–3	43,091	
September 7	7:00 pm	Navy*	No. 15	Rutgers Stadium; Piscataway, NJ	ESPN	W 41–24	43,514	
September 15	3:30 pm	Norfolk State*^{†}	No. 13	Rutgers Stadium; Piscataway, NJ	ESPN Plus	W 59–0	43,712	
September 29	3:30 pm	Maryland*	No. 10	Rutgers Stadium; Piscataway, NJ	ABC	L 24–34	43,803	
October 6	8:00 pm	No. 20 Cincinnati	No. 21	Rutgers Stadium; Piscataway, NJ	ESPN2	L 23–28	43,768	
October 13	12:00 pm	at Syracuse		Carrier Dome; Syracuse, NY	ESPN Plus	W 38–14	36,226	
October 18	7:45 pm	No. 2 South Florida		Rutgers Stadium; Piscataway, NJ	ESPN	W 30–27	44,267	
October 27	12:00 pm	No. 6 West Virginia	No. 25	Rutgers Stadium; Piscataway, NJ	ABC	L 3–31	43,620	
November 3	7:00 pm	at No. 16 Connecticut		Rentschler Field; East Hartford, CT	ESPNU	L 19–38	40,000	
November 9	8:00 pm	at Army*		Michie Stadium; West Point, NY	ESPN2	W 41–6	39,073	
November 17	12:00 pm	Pittsburgh		Rutgers Stadium; Piscataway, NJ	ESPN Plus	W 20–16	43,531	
November 29	7:45 pm	at Louisville		Papa John's Cardinal Stadium; Louisville, KY	ESPN	L 38–41	37,012	
January 5	12:00 pm	Ball State*		Rogers Centre; Toronto, ON (International Bowl)	ESPN2	W 52–30	31,455	
*Non-conference game; ^{†}Homecoming; Rankings from AP Poll released prior to the game; All times are in Eastern time
