= 2007 Louisville Cardinals football team =

American college football season

2007 Louisville Cardinals football
- Conference: Big East Conference
- Record: 6–6 (3–4 Big East)
- Head coach: Steve Kragthorpe (1st season)
- Offensive coordinator: Charlie Stubbs (1st season)
- Offensive scheme: Multiple
- Defensive coordinator: Mike Cassity (4th season)
- Base defense: 4–3
- Home stadium: Papa John's Cardinal Stadium

2007 Big East Conference football standings
	Conf.			Overall
Team	W		L	W		L
No. 6 West Virginia $+	5	–	2	11	–	2
Connecticut +	5	–	2	9	–	4
No. 17 Cincinnati	4	–	3	10	–	3
South Florida	4	–	3	9	–	4
Rutgers	3	–	4	8	–	5
Louisville	3	–	4	6	–	6
Pittsburgh	3	–	4	5	–	7
Syracuse	1	–	6	2	–	10
$ – BCS representative as conference champion; + – Conference co-champions; Rankings from AP Poll

The 2007 Louisville Cardinals football team represented the University of Louisville in the 2007 NCAA Division I FBS football season. The team, led by Steve Kragthorpe in his first year at the school, played their home games in Papa John's Cardinal Stadium and were in their third year in the Big East Conference. With the stunning upsets, the team has missed a bowl game for the first time in a decade (since 1997).

== Pre-season ==
The Cardinals finished the 2006 season with a 12–1 record, including a win in the Orange Bowl. After the win, they were ranked fifth in the nation. Returning fourteen starters from their 2006 team, including quarterback Brian Brohm the team was picked, by the Big East media, to finish second in the conference, and were ranked between five and 13 in various preseason polls.

=== Coaching changes ===
Almost a week after their victory in the Orange Bowl, head coach, Bobby Petrino, was offered and took the head coaching position with the NFL's Atlanta Falcons. Two days later, Steve Kragthorpe, former head coach for the Tulsa Golden Hurricane, was hired for the position. Though five assistant coaches were retained, five new assistants were hired in the off-season, three of which came with Kragthorpe from his staff at Tulsa.

=== Roster changes ===
Although returning 14 starters from 2006, the team lost four players to the 2007 NFL draft. From the offense, running back Michael Bush was taken in the fourth round by Oakland and running back Kolby Smith was taken in the fifth round by Kansas City. From the defense, tackle Amobi Okoye was taken tenth by Houston while cornerback, William Gay was taken in the fifth round by Pittsburgh.

=== Recruiting ===
The Cardinals signed 15 recruits for the new class, including three junior-college transfers. Included in the top-50 class were one five-star recruit on defense, three four-star recruits on offense and another four-star recruit on defense. Also entering in with the class was 2006 recruit Josh Chichester, who wasn't able to enroll with his recruiting class.

College recruiting information (2007)
Name	Hometown	School	Height	Weight	40^{‡}	Commit date
Victor Anderson; RB	Louisville, KY	St. Xavier HS	5 ft 9 in (1.75 m)	176 lb (80 kg)	4.44	Jan 28, 2007
Victor Anderson; RB	Recruit ratings: Scout: Rivals: (74)					
Doug Beaumont; WR	Louisville, KY	Male HS	5 ft 9 in (1.75 m)	176 lb (80 kg)	4.45	Sep 17, 2006
Doug Beaumont; WR	Recruit ratings: Scout: Rivals: (78)					
Michael Fennerty; TE	Olympia, WA	Olympia HS	6 ft 4 in (1.93 m)	210 lb (95 kg)	4.86	Feb 24, 2007
Michael Fennerty; TE	Recruit ratings: Scout: Rivals: (40)					
Patrick Grant; DE	Lauderdale Lakes, FL	Boyd H. Anderson HS	6 ft 4 in (1.93 m)	218 lb (99 kg)	4.6	Feb 7, 2007
Patrick Grant; DE	Recruit ratings: Scout: Rivals: (74)					
Zach Kiernan; OT	Newport, KY	Newport Central Catholic HS	6 ft 6 in (1.98 m)	242 lb (110 kg)	NA	Oct 10, 2006
Zach Kiernan; OT	Recruit ratings: Scout: Rivals: (40)					
Dale Martin; RB	Bolingbrook, IL	Bolingbrook HS	5 ft 11 in (1.80 m)	195 lb (88 kg)	4.5	Jan 6, 2007
Dale Martin; RB	Recruit ratings: Scout: Rivals: (77)					
Josh Miller; WR	Palatka, FL	Palatka HS	6 ft 2 in (1.88 m)	182 lb (83 kg)	4.5	Jan 25, 2007
Josh Miller; WR	Recruit ratings: Scout: Rivals: (40)					
C.J. Peake; S	Trotwood, OH	Trotwood-Madison HS	6 ft 2 in (1.88 m)	212 lb (96 kg)	4.55	Jan 26, 2007
C.J. Peake; S	Recruit ratings: Scout: Rivals: (76)					
Bilal Powell; S	Lakeland, FL	Lake Gibson Senior HS	6 ft 0 in (1.83 m)	200 lb (91 kg)	4.5	Jan 24, 2007
Bilal Powell; S	Recruit ratings: Scout: Rivals: (40)					
Matt Simms; QB	Ramsey, NJ	Don Bosco Prep School	6 ft 2 in (1.88 m)	200 lb (91 kg)	4.8	Jan 29, 2007
Matt Simms; QB	Recruit ratings: Scout: Rivals: (70)					
Chaz Thompson; CB	Weed, CA	College of the Siskiyous	6 ft 1 in (1.85 m)	195 lb (88 kg)	4.35	Jan 21, 2007
Chaz Thompson; CB	Recruit ratings: Scout: Rivals: (NA)					
Greg Tomczyk; OT	Princeton, NJ	The Hun School	6 ft 6 in (1.98 m)	290 lb (130 kg)	4.88	Jan 17, 2007
Greg Tomczyk; OT	Recruit ratings: Scout: Rivals: (60)					
Woodny Turenne; DB	Visalia, CA	College of the Sequoias	6 ft 2 in (1.88 m)	190 lb (86 kg)	4.34	Jan 25, 2007
Woodny Turenne; DB	Recruit ratings: Scout: Rivals: (NA)					
Mark Wetterer; OG	Cincinnati, OH	Anderson HS	6 ft 5 in (1.96 m)	292 lb (132 kg)	5.3	Dec 2, 2006
Mark Wetterer; OG	Recruit ratings: Scout: Rivals: (74)					
Willie Williams; LB	Culver City, CA	West Los Angeles	6 ft 3 in (1.91 m)	232 lb (105 kg)	NA	Jan 25, 2007
Willie Williams; LB	Recruit ratings: Scout: Rivals: (NA)					
Overall recruit ranking: Scout: #47 Rivals: #41
‡ Refers to 40-yard dash; Note: In many cases, Scout, Rivals, 247Sports, On3, and ESPN may conflict in their listings of height, weight and 40 time.; In these cases, the average was taken. ESPN grades are on a 100-point scale.; Sources: "Louisville Commit List 2007". Rivals.; "Scout.com Football Recruiting: Louisville". Scout.; "2007 Player Commitments – Louisville". ESPN.; "Scout.com Team Recruiting Rankings". Scout.; "2007 Team Ranking". Rivals.com.

=== Pre-season honors ===
Three Cardinal players were honored as part of pre-season watchlists for national awards.

- Brian Brohm – Manning Award and Maxwell Award
- Adrian Grady – Bronko Nagurski Trophy
- Eric Wood – Outland Trophy

In addition to the honors, Brohm was also named to the Playboy pre-season All-America team.

== Season ==
=== Roster ===
Wide receivers

- 3 Trent Guy – (redshirt) Sophomore
- 4 Patrick Carter – Senior
- 7 Mario Urrutia – Junior
- 9 Chris Vaughn – Junior
- 21 Troy Pascley – (redshirt) Freshman
- 25 Josh Miller – Freshman
- 26 JaJuan Spillman – Sophomore
- 27 Doug Beaumont – Freshman
- 83 Steve Orndorff – (redshirt) Freshman
- 83 Andrew Robinson – (redshirt) Sophomore
- 84 Scott Long – (redshirt) Sophomore
- 85 Harry Douglas – Senior
- 87 Corey Thompson – Junior
- 89 Josh Chichester – Freshman

Centers

- 62 Nick Borgelt – Junior
- 77 Eric Wood – Junior

Offensive guards

- 63 Danny Barlowe – Senior
- 66 Mike Donoghue – (redshirt) Sophomore
- 69 Marcel Benson – Senior
- 70 Conrad Thomas – (redshirt) Freshman
- 71 Abdul Kuyateh – Junior
- 79 Mark Wetterer – Freshman

Offensive tackles

- 51 Ryan Kessling – Freshman
- 55 Greg Tomczyk – Freshman
- 65 Josh Byrom – Sophomore
- 68 George Bussey – Junior
- 72 Brian Roche – (redshirt) Sophomore
- 74 Jeffrey Adams – (redshirt) Freshman
- 75 Zach Taylor – (redshirt) Freshman
- 76 Hector Hernandez – Freshman
- 78 Breno Giacomini – Senior

Tight ends

- 49 Pete Nochta – (redshirt) Freshman
- 80 Mike Fennerty – Freshman
- 81 Scott Kuhn – Senior
- 82 Gary Barnidge – Senior
- 86 Zach Meagher – Freshman

Quarterbacks

- 5 Matt Simms – Freshman
- 12 Brian Brohm – Senior
- 14 Hunter Cantwell – Junior
- 15 Bill Ashburn – Junior
- 17 Tyler Wolfe – (redshirt) Freshman
- 18 Caleb Newton – (redshirt) Freshman

Tailbacks

- 20 Victor Anderson – (redshirt) Freshman
- 24 George Stripling – Junior
- 28 Sergio Spencer – Junior
- 30 Dale Martin – Freshman
- 42 Anthony Allen – Sophomore
- 45 Blayne Donnell – (redshirt) Freshman

Fullbacks

- 32 Brock Bolen – Junior
- 48 Joe Tronzo – (redshirt) Sophomore

Defensive ends

- 8 Deantwan Whitehead – Sophomore
- 56 Michael Adams – (redshirt) Sophomore
- 58 Rodney Gnat – (redshirt) Freshman
- 73 Zach Kiernan – Freshman
- 88 Brandon Cox – Senior
- 90 Johnnie Burns – Junior
- 95 Maurice Mitchell – Junior

Defensive tackles

- 52 Elisee Pompilius – Junior
- 91 L.T. Walker – Freshman
- 92 Willie Williams – Senior
- 93 LD Scott – (redshirt) Sophomore
- 94 Adrian Grady – Junior
- 97 Aundre Henderson – (redshirt) Freshman
- 99 Earl Heyman – Junior

Cornerbacks

- 4 Travis Norton – Junior
- 9 Woodney Turenne – Junior
- 14 Rod Council – Junior
- 15 Chaz Thompson – Junior
- 19 Johnny Patrick – (redshirt) Freshman
- 22 James Wyatt – (redshirt) Freshman
- 34 Bobby Buchanan – Junior
- 37 Marcus Folmar – Junior
- 39 Marcell Lesueur – (redshirt) Freshman
- 44 Maurice Urrutia – Freshman

Linebackers

- 6 Preston Smith – Senior
- 7 Willie A. Williams – Junior
- 11 Malik Jackson – Senior
- 29 Lamar Myles – Junior
- 31 Darius Mann – (redshirt) Sophomore
- 41 Eugene Sowell – (redshirt) Freshman
- 46 Terrance Butler – Senior
- 50 Josh McDonald – (redshirt) Sophomore
- 54 James Bryant – (redshirt) Junior
- 54 Rashad Roberts – (redshirt) Sophomore
- 55 Chase Floyd – Junior
- 57 Mozell Axson – Junior
- 96 Patrick Grant – Freshman

Safeties

- 2 Richard Raglin – Junior
- 5 Brandon Heath – (redshirt) Freshman
- 10 Latarrius Thomas – Sophomore
- 13 Jon Russell – Senior
- 21 C.J. Peake – Freshman
- 23 Stephen Garr – (redshirt) Sophomore
- 24 Scedric Moss – (redshirt) Freshman
- 26 Daniel Covington – (redshirt) Sophomore
- 32 Bilal Powell – Freshman
- 38 Deon Palmer – Senior

Long snappers

- 40 Dane Mattingly – Sophomore

Punters

- 29 Cory Goettsche – Sophomore

Place kickers

- 15 Mac Soult – (redshirt) Freshman
- 18 Art Carmody – Senior
- 36 Todd Flannery – Senior
- 43 Justin Waltrip – (redshirt) Freshman
- 44 Paul Belshoff – (redshirt) Freshman
- 64 Steve Hartman – Freshman

Sources: http://www.cstv.com/auto_pdf/p_hotos/s_chools/lou/sports/m-footbl/auto_pdf/07-fb-guide-44-59 http://louisville.scout.com/a.z?s=17&p=8&c=2&nid=696&yr=2007

=== Coaching staff ===
The 2007 Cardinal team was coached by Steve Kragthorpe and his staff. Much of the coaching staff from 2006 remained, but Kragthorpe brought in other to fill out the staff, including, initially, three from his previous position. Keith Patterson was originally brought in from Tulsa as defensive coordinator and cornerbacks coach, however returned to Tulsa before the season began for personal reasons. Patterson was quickly replaced by Mike Mallory.

Name	Position	Year at Louisville	Alma Mater (Year)
Steve Kragthorpe	Head coach	1st	West Texas A&M (1988)
Jeff Brohm	Quarterbacks	5th	Louisville (1993)
Mike Cassity	Defensive coordinator Safeties	4th	Kentucky (1976)
Reggie Johnson	Inside linebackers	5th	Louisville (1996)
Mark Nelson	Defensive line Special teams	1st	East Central (1980)
Greg Nord	Tight ends Recruiting coordinator	13th	Kentucky (1980)
Charlie Stubbs	Offensive coordinator Wide receivers	1st	Brigham Young (1978)
Brent Myers	Offensive line	1st	Eastern Washington (1982)
Tony Alford	Running backs	1st	Colorado State (1992)
Mike Mallory	Secondary	1st	Michigan (1985)

=== Schedule ===
Date	Time	Opponent	Rank	Site	TV	Result	Attendance
August 30	7:30 pm	Murray State*	No. 10	Papa John's Cardinal Stadium; Louisville, KY	ESPNU	W 73–10	42,185
September 6	7:00 pm	Middle Tennessee*	No. 8	Papa John's Cardinal Stadium; Louisville, KY	ESPN2	W 58–42	40,882
September 15	7:30 pm	at Kentucky*	No. 9	Commonwealth Stadium; Lexington, KY (Governor's Cup)	ESPN Classic	L 34–40	70,857
September 22	12:00 pm	Syracuse	No. 18	Papa John's Cardinal Stadium; Louisville, KY	ESPN+	L 35–38	40,922
September 29	3:30 pm	at NC State*		Carter–Finley Stadium; Raleigh, NC	ESPNU	W 29–10	56,487
October 5	8:00 pm	Utah*		Papa John's Cardinal Stadium; Louisville, KY	ESPN	L 35–44	40,894
October 13	7:00 pm	at No. 17 Cincinnati		Nippert Stadium; Cincinnati, OH (The Keg of Nails)	ESPNU	W 28–24	35,097
October 19	8:00 pm	at Connecticut		Rentschler Field; East Hartford, CT	ESPN	L 17–21	40,000
October 27	12:00 pm	Pittsburgh^{†}		Papa John's Cardinal Stadium; Louisville, KY	ESPN+	W 24–17	34,792
November 8	7:30 pm	at No. 6 West Virginia		Mountaineer Field; Morgantown, WV	ESPN	L 31–38	60,992
November 17	8:00 pm	at South Florida		Raymond James Stadium; Tampa, FL	ESPNU	L 17–55	57,288
November 29	7:30 pm	Rutgers		Papa John's Cardinal Stadium; Louisville, KY	ESPN	W 41–38	39,612
*Non-conference game; ^{†}Homecoming; Rankings from Coaches' Poll released prior to the game; All times are in Eastern time
