= 2007 Connecticut Huskies football team =

American college football season

2007 Connecticut Huskies football
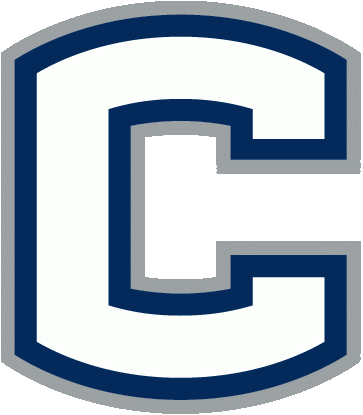

Big East co-champion

Meineke Car Care Bowl, L 10–24 vs. Wake Forest
- Conference: Big East Conference
- Record: 9–4 (5–2 Big East)
- Head coach: Randy Edsall (9th season)
- Offensive coordinator: Rob Ambrose (2nd season)
- Offensive scheme: Multiple
- Defensive coordinator: Todd Orlando (3rd season)
- Base defense: 3–4
- Home stadium: Rentschler Field

2007 Big East Conference football standings
	Conf.			Overall
Team	W		L	W		L
No. 6 West Virginia $+	5	–	2	11	–	2
Connecticut +	5	–	2	9	–	4
No. 17 Cincinnati	4	–	3	10	–	3
South Florida	4	–	3	9	–	4
Rutgers	3	–	4	8	–	5
Louisville	3	–	4	6	–	6
Pittsburgh	3	–	4	5	–	7
Syracuse	1	–	6	2	–	10
$ – BCS representative as conference champion; + – Conference co-champions; Rankings from AP Poll

The 2007 Connecticut Huskies football team represented the University of Connecticut as a member of the Big East Conference during the 2007 NCAA Division I FBS football season. Led by ninth-year head coach Randy Edsall, the Huskies compiled an overall record of 9–4 with a mark of 5–2 in conference play, sharing the Big East title with West Virginia. Connecticut was invited to the Meineke Car Care Bowl, where the Huskies lost to Wake Forest. The team played home games at Rentschler Field in East Hartford, Connecticut.

For the first time, Connecticut was ranked in the final Bowl Championship Series (BCS) standings. The Huskies finished as at No. 25 and peaked at No. 13 during the season.

== Schedule ==
Date	Time	Opponent	Rank	Site	TV	Result	Attendance
September 1	2:00 pm	at Duke*		Wallace Wade Stadium; Durham, NC		W 45–14	17,251
September 8	7:00 pm	Maine*		Rentschler Field; East Hartford, CT	ESPN Plus	W 38–0	35,413
September 15	12:00 pm	Temple*		Rentschler Field; East Hartford, CT	ESPN Plus	W 22–17	33,810
September 22	8:00 pm	at Pittsburgh		Heinz Field; Pittsburgh, PA	ESPNU	W 34–14	40,145
September 29	12:00 pm	Akron*		Rentschler Field; East Hartford, CT	ESPN Plus	W 44–10	38,212
October 13	3:30 pm	at Virginia*		Scott Stadium; Charlottesville, VA	ESPNU	L 16–17	60,004
October 19	8:00 pm	Louisville^{†}		Rentschler Field; East Hartford, CT	ESPN	W 21–17	40,000
October 27	3:30 pm	No. 11 South Florida		Rentschler Field; East Hartford, CT	ABC	W 22–15	40,000
November 3	7:15 pm	Rutgers	No. 16	Rentschler Field; East Hartford, CT	ESPNU	W 38–19	40,000
November 10	3:30 pm	at Cincinnati	No. 16	Nippert Stadium; Cincinnati, OH	ESPNU	L 3–27	30,943
November 17	12:00 pm	Syracuse	No. 25	Rentschler Field; East Hartford, CT (rivalry)	ESPN2	W 30–7	40,000
November 24	3:30 pm	at No. 4 West Virginia	No. 20	Milan Puskar Stadium; Morgantown, WV	ABC	L 21–66	59,701
December 29	1:00 pm	vs. Wake Forest		Bank of America Stadium; Charlotte, NC (Meineke Car Care Bowl)	ESPN	L 10–24	53,126
*Non-conference game; ^{†}Homecoming; Rankings from AP Poll released prior to the game; All times are in Eastern time

== Rankings ==
Ranking movements Legend: ██ Increase in ranking ██ Decrease in ranking — = Not ranked
	Week																
Poll	Pre	1	2	3	4	5	6	7	8	9	10	11	12	13	14	15	Final
AP	—	—	—	—	—	—	—	—	—	—	16	16	25	20	—	—	—
Coaches	—	—	—	—	—	—	—	—	—	—	20	16	—	21	—	—	—
Harris	Not released					—	—	—	—	—	19	16	—	21	—	—	Not released
BCS	Not released								—	23	13	13	24	20	—	25	Not released

== Game summaries ==
=== Duke ===
	1	2	3	4	Total
Connecticut	5	6	14	20	45
Duke	7	7	0	0	14

In a game that was a tale of two halves, the Huskies started the season with a 45–14 win against Duke, extending the Blue Devils' winless streak to twenty-one straight.

=== Maine ===
	1	2	3	4	Total
Maine	0	0	0	0	0
Connecticut	7	10	14	7	38

UConn improved its overall record to 2–0 for the fourth time in five years and its record in home openers at Rentschler Field to 5–0. This was the Huskies' first shutout since a 59–0 victory over Liberty in 2005.

=== Temple ===
	1	2	3	4	Total
Temple	0	7	10	0	17
Connecticut	10	3	3	6	22

In a game which the Huskies were heavily favored, it took the help of a rotund security guard to win the game. After taking the lead early in the fourth quarter, the Huskies fought off a last-minute drive by the Owls. On the final play of the game, Temple ran a wide receiver reverse pass, which was batted down in the end zone by UConn defensive back Robert Vaughn. However, on the deflection, the ball was caught by the Owls' Bruce Francis, who was ruled out of bounds. Replays on TV showed Francis did appear to get one foot inbounds; however, it is debatable whether he also had possession at that point. After an official review, the play was upheld. The replay angle which could have provided the conclusive evidence, both foot inbounds and possession, was obstructed by a security guard standing in the line of sight of the television camera. The Huskies improved to 3–0 for the first time since 1998.

=== Pittsburgh ===
	1	2	3	4	Total
Connecticut	10	17	0	7	34
Pittsburgh	0	7	0	7	14

The Huskies continued their dominance in a 34-14 victory over the Pittsburgh Panthers at Heinz Field. The victory marked the first time UConn had started 4-0 since 1997, as well as the first time the Huskies had won a Big East road opener. The victory was also the Huskies' second-ever win on the road within the conference.

=== Akron ===
	1	2	3	4	Total
Akron	0	10	0	0	10
Connecticut	0	16	21	7	44

Returning home to East Hartford, the Huskies held off the Zips to win their fifth straight game for the first time since 1995. The Huskies were led by running back Andre Dixon who scampered for 116 yards on 12 carries, as well as his first two touchdowns of his career. Junior college transfer quarterback Tyler Lorenzen contributed 203 yards and two touchdowns of his own.

=== Virginia ===
	1	2	3	4	Total
Connecticut	6	0	7	3	16
Virginia	7	7	0	3	17

In a game which the winner was almost guaranteed a spot in the top 25, the Huskies came up just short. After allowing the go-ahead field goal with 3:20 left in the game the Huskies began the assault upfield. After a solid return, and two consecutive 11-yard runs by quarterback Tyler Lorenzen, the Huskies made the first of 3 costly mistakes allowing a snap from the shotgun formation to go whizzing by Lorenzen for a 21-yard loss. This proved to be the pivotal point in the game as the Huskies were unable to advance the ball, and in fact, turned the ball over on another botched snap from the gun, sealing a 17-16 victory for the Hoos.

=== Louisville ===
	1	2	3	4	Total
Louisville	7	0	0	10	17
Connecticut	0	0	7	14	21

The Huskies again returned to the friendly confines of Rentschler Field for a heavily anticipated match-up with conference foe Louisville. Weather conditions were less than ideal as heavy rains had pounded Connecticut throughout the day. After holding the Cardinals high powered offense to just seven points in the first half. Momentum soon swung in the favor of the Huskies, just moments into the third quarter. A controversial 76-yard punt return by Larry Taylor knotted the game at 7-7. It appeared as though Taylor had called for a fair catch; however, no whistle was blown, allowing him to run down the sideline for the score against a Louisville return team which had let up due to the apparent fair catch. After a field goal and a fumble return, the Cardinals appeared to be up for good with just over ten minutes left. A Tyler Lorenzen touchdown pass to quarterback-turned-wide receiver D.J. Hernandez pulled the Huskies to within three points. After a defensive stop, the Huskies drove down the field, and Andre Dixon scored the game-winning touchdown with 1:32 left to play. Linebacker Danny Lansanah cemented the victory picking off Cardinals quarterback Brian Brohm with 15 seconds to play. The win improved Connecticut's record to 6-1, making the Huskies bowl eligible for the third time in school history.

=== South Florida ===
	1	2	3	4	Total
No. 10 USF	0	0	9	6	15
No. 23 Connecticut	3	13	3	3	22

Back in East Hartford for the second of three straight home games, the Huskies looked to make a statement against 10th ranked South Florida. On yet another rainy Connecticut afternoon, UConn jumped out to an early 3-0 lead. On the ensuing possession, USF marched down the field, but were unable to capitalize as kicker Delbie Alvarado missed a 26-yard field goal. Midway through the second quarter, Quarterback Tyler Lorenzen hooked up with TE Steve Brouse for a three-yard touchdown pass. On the next possession, Linebacker Scott Lutrus intercepted a Matt Grothe pass, and returned it 23 yards for a touchdown. The interception was Lutrus' fourth of the year, and second returned for a touchdown. The score put UConn up 16-0, after a botched extra point attempt. The score held going into the half. South Florida finally lit up the scoreboard with just over six minutes to play in the third quarter on a blocked punt, which was covered up in the endzone by the Huskies for a safety. After the free kick, Matt Grothe took just :29 to scamper for two runs and pull the Bulls closer. After a sandwich of a UConn and USF field goals (UConn, USF, USF, UConn). South Florida began to drive down the field with 5:19 left. After getting into the redzone down 7, the Bulls were unable to capitalize, as a 3-yard touchdown run was called back due to a holding call. On the next play, Grothe was sacked by Redshirt freshman Greg Robinson. On the final play, Grothe passed incomplete into the corner of the endzone, sealing the 22-15 victory for the Huskies. The win was the first ever for the Huskies against a ranked opponent, and the students celebrated by rushing the field.

=== Rutgers ===
	1	2	3	4	Total
Rutgers	3	13	3	0	19
No. 13 Connecticut	18	7	7	6	38

At Rentschler Field for the finale of a three-game homestand the Huskies were the favorite against the rival Rutgers. Uconn started the game with a blocked Jeremy Ito punt by quarterback, turned wide receiver D.J. Hernandez which went for a safety. After the punt, Uconn progressed to drive down the field as junior college transfer Tyler Lorenzen hit Steve Brouse on a short two yard out route in the endzone. Tony Ciaravino missed the extra point making the score 8-0 Uconn. Rutgers came right back with a Ray Rice 45-yard run and eventually an Ito 30-yard field goal making the score 8-3. Tyvon Branch came back with a 48-yard return and Ciaravino hit a 44-yard field goal increasing the lead to 11-3. Uconn had good field possession late in the first quarter and Lorenzen hooked up with wide out Terrence Jeffers for 34 yards. Rutgers proceeded to march down with a long drive ending with another Ito field goal in the second quarter. On the kickoff, Tyvon Branch took the ball to the outside juking in and then speeding to the outside of Ito for a 97-yard return. Rutgers drove again ending with a Ray Rice 4-yard touchdown run. After a Uconn punt Rutgers ended the half with another Ito field goal. In the third quarter Ito hit another field goal from 27 yards after multiple punts from both teams. Uconn drove again and with Andre Dixon out of the game, the ball was handed to sophomore Donald Brown who found a large hole on the right side and took it for a 33-yard touchdown. After a missed Ito field goal Ciaravino came back with a 30 yarder of his own. After a Rutgers punt Ciaravino hit another field goal this one from 26 yards. After Rutgers drove to the Uconn 35, with 8:17 to go in the 4th Quarter Rutgers failed on a fourth and four. After a Desi Cullen punt for Uconn, a Robert McClain interception of Mike Teel, and another Cullen punt. Teel drove again and at one point completed 6 passes in a row until time ran out. This win gave Uconn an 8-1 record and Donald Brown came off the bench and ran for 154 yards and a touchdown. Ray Rice was held to less than 30 yards in the second half and Tyvon Branch was subsequently named Big East special teams player of the week.

=== Cincinnati ===
	1	2	3	4	Total
No. 13 Connecticut	0	3	0	0	3
Cincinnati	13	0	7	7	27

The Cincinnati Bearcats beat the UConn Huskies behind a strong performance by the Bearcats' quarterback Ben Mauk. Mauk threw for 276 yards and 3 touchdowns with 21 completions on 33 attempts. He also added a rushing touchdown. The Huskies managed only one scoring drive, an 11-play, 74-yard drive in 2nd quarter, resulting in a field goal.

=== Syracuse ===
	1	2	3	4	Total
Syracuse	0	0	0	7	7
No. 24 Connecticut	14	7	3	6	30

This is senior day for 11 seniors including leaders Dan Davis and Danny Lansanah, along with 27-year-old Zak Penwell. Other seniors include specials team phenom Larry Taylor and corner Tyvon Branch. The win made UConn the second team in the history of the Big East to finish a season with 7 wins at home, joining the 1993 West Virginia Mountaineers.

=== West Virginia ===
	1	2	3	4	Total
No. 20 Connecticut	7	7	0	7	21
No. 3 West Virginia	14	10	21	21	66

West Virginia's blowout victory over the Huskies resulted in a sarcastic running joke in the UConn student paper, the Daily Campus. Variations on the joke, "West Virginia just scored again," began running in the paper's InstantDaily feature the Monday following the game and continued well into the Spring 2008 semester.

=== Meineke Car Care Bowl ===
	1	2	3	4	Total
No. 25 Connecticut	7	3	0	0	10
Wake Forest	0	0	14	10	24

The Huskies were invited to their second bowl game.

== Roster ==
Wide receiver

- 88 Mike Conroy- Fr.
- 12 Marcus Easley- Jr.
- 87 Ellis Gaulden- Jr.
- 14 D.J. Hernandez- Jr.
- 80 Terence Jeffers- So.
- 3 Brad Kanuch- So.
- 94 Alex Molina- Fr.
- 83 Isiah Moore- Fr.
- 82 Kashif Moore- Fr.
- 19 Erik Muschette- Jr.
- 85 Kevin Poles- Fr.
- 24 Larry Taylor- Sr.
- 39 Robert Theoudele- Jr.

Center

- 77 Bobby Fry- So.
- 68 Keith Gray- Jr.
- 69 Trey Tonsing III- Jr.

Offensive guard

- 62 Lawrence Green- So.
- 74 Alex LaMagdelaine- So.
- 66 Mathieu Olivier- Fr.
- 63 Jared Pratt- So.
- 58 Andrew Presnell- So.
- 55 Donald Thomas- Sr.

Offensive tackle

- 64 William Beatty- Jr.
- 79 Mike Hicks - So.
- 78 Zach Hurd- Fr.
- 60 Justin Lattimore- Jr.
- 73 Dan Ryan- So.

Tight end

- 84 Yianni Apostolakos - Fr.
- 91 Martin Bedard - Jr.
- 90 Steve Brouse - Jr.
- 46 AJ Johnson - Fr.
- 89 Derek Rich- Fr.

Quarterback

- 11 Dennis Brown- So.
- 12 Cody Endres - Fr.
- 10 Zach Frazer- Fr.
- 4 Tyler Lorenzen- Jr.
- 19 Matt Vollono- Fr.

Tailback

- 5 Lou Allen- Jr.
- 34 Donald Brown - So.
- 2 Andre Dixon- So.
- 44 Robbie Frey- Fr.
- 40 Nathan Sherr- Fr.
- 37 Joss Tillard- Fr.
- 22 Kelmetrus Wylie - Fr.

Fullback

- 47 Anthony Davis-Fr.
- 49 Anthony Sherman -Fr.

Defensive end

- 50 Cody Brown -Jr.
- 26 Marcus Campbell - Fr.
- 56 Mike Cox - Fr.
- 95 Joe Hartigan - Sr.
- 96 Gary Mack - Sr.
- 99 Kendall Reyes - Fr.
- 45 Julius Williams - Jr.
- 9 Lindsey Witten - So.

Defensive tackle

- 6 Dan Davis - Sr.
- 52 Brandon Dillon - So.
- 65 Rob Lunn - Jr.
- 4 Twyon Martin - Fr.
- 94 Zak Penwell - Sr.
- 54 Alex Polito - Fr.
- 53 Danny Russell - Fr.
- 92 Scott Schultz - Fr.

Cornerback

- 20 Terry Baltimore-So.
- 29 Tyvon Branch-Sr.
- 1 Darius Butler - Jr.
- 35 Jameson Davis - Jr.
- 30 Derrick Foster-Fr.
- 16 Jasper Howard - Fr.
- 7 Khaliyl Lane - Fr.
- 42 Robert McClain- So.
- 21 Gary Wilburn - Fr.

Linebacker

- 23 Matt Ashmead -So.
- 18 Aaron Bryant -So.
- 51 Alex Folson - Fr.
- 18 Donald Goudreau-Fr.
- 43 Ryan Henegan -Sr.
- 48 Danny Lansanah -Sr.
- 95 Greg Lloyd - Fr.
- 32 Scott Lutrus -Fr.
- 31 C.J. Marck -Fr.
- 59 Jarrell Miller -Fr.
- 10 Greg Robinson Jr.
- 37 Corey Stringer - Fr.
- 8 Lawrence Wilson- Fr.

Safety

- 27 Aaron Bagsby - Fr.
- 36 Dahna Deleston -Jr.
- 15 Donnell Ford -Sr.
- 7 Glen Mourning -So.
- 33 Robert Vaughn- So.

Punter

- 13 Desi Cullen- So.

Place kicker

- 97 Tony Ciaravino- Jr.
- 38 Dave Teggart -Fr.

== After the season ==
=== NFL draft ===
The following Huskies were selected in the 2008 NFL draft following the season.

Round	Pick	Player	Position	NFL club
4	100	Tyvon Branch	Defensive back	Oakland Raiders
6	195	Donald Thomas	Guard	Miami Dolphins
