= 2007 NCAA Division I FBS football rankings =

- Season: 2007
- Bowl season: 2007–08 bowl games
- Preseason No. 1: USC
- End of season champions: LSU
- Conference with most teams in final AP poll: Big 10, Big 12, SEC (5)

Three polls and one formulaic ranking make up the 2007 NCAA Division I FBS (Football Bowl Subdivision) football rankings, in addition to various publications' preseason polls. Unlike most sports, college football's governing body, the NCAA, does not bestow a national championship title. That title is bestowed by one or more of four different polling agencies. There are two main weekly polls that begin in the preseason: the AP Poll and the Coaches Poll. About halfway through the season, two additional polls are released, the Harris Interactive Poll and the Bowl Championship Series (BCS) standings. The Harris Poll and Coaches Poll are factors in the BCS standings. At the end of the season, the BCS standings determine who plays in the BCS bowl games as well as the BCS National Championship Game.

== Legend ==
	Increase in ranking
	Decrease in ranking
	Not ranked previous week
	Selected for BCS National Championship Game
(#–#)	Win–loss record
(Italics)	Number of first place votes
т	Tied with team above or below also with this symbol

== AP Poll ==
As a result of Michigan's loss to Division I FCS Appalachian State, the AP Poll changed its policy on not allowing pollsters to vote for Division I FCS opponents. Now, if the Division I-FCS team has played a Division I FBS team, they are eligible to be voted for in the AP Poll.

	Preseason Aug 18	Week 1 Sept 4	Week 2 Sept 9	Week 3 Sept 16	Week 4 Sept 23	Week 5 Sept 30	Week 6 Oct 7	Week 7 Oct 14	Week 8 Oct 21	Week 9 Oct 28	Week 10 Nov 4	Week 11 Nov 11	Week 12 Nov 18	Week 13 Nov 25	Week 14 Dec 2	Week 15 (Final) Jan 8	
1.	USC (62)	USC (1–0) (59)	USC (1–0) (40)	USC (2–0) (46)	USC (3–0) (43)	LSU (5–0) (33)	LSU (6–0) (65)	Ohio State (7–0) (50)	Ohio State (8–0) (57)	Ohio State (9–0) (59)	Ohio State (10–0) (60)	LSU (9–1) (40)	LSU (10–1) (60)	Missouri (11–1) (45)	Ohio State (11–1) (50)	LSU (12–2) (60)	1.
2.	LSU (2)	LSU (1–0) (5)	LSU (2–0) (25)	LSU (3–0) (19)	LSU (4–0) (22)	USC (4–0) (32)	California (5–0)	South Florida (6–0) (11)	Boston College (7–0) (2)	Boston College (8–0) (1)	LSU (8–1) (5)	Oregon (8–1) (22)	Kansas (11–0) (3)	West Virginia (10–1) (20)	LSU (11–2) (11)	Georgia (11–2) (3)	2.
3.	West Virginia (1)	West Virginia (1–0) (1)	Oklahoma (2–0)	Florida (3–0)	Oklahoma (4–0)	California (5–0)	Ohio State (6–0)	Boston College (7–0) (1)	LSU (7–1) (5)	LSU (7–1) (3)	Oregon (8–1)	Oklahoma (9–1) (1)	Missouri (10–1) (1)	Ohio State (11–1)	Oklahoma (11–2) (1)	USC (11–2) (1)	3.
4.	Texas	Florida (1–0)	West Virginia (2–0)	Oklahoma (3–0)	Florida (4–0)	Ohio State (5–0)	Boston College (6–0)	Oklahoma (6–1) (1)	Oklahoma (7–1)	Oregon (7–1)	Oklahoma (8–1)	Kansas (10–0) (1)	West Virginia (9–1) (1)	Georgia (10–2)	Georgia (10–2) (1)	Missouri (12–2)	4.
5.	Michigan	Oklahoma (1–0) т	Florida (2–0)	West Virginia (3–0)	West Virginia (4–0)	Wisconsin (5–0)	South Florida (5–0)	LSU (6–1) (1)	Oregon (6–1)	Oklahoma (7–1)	Kansas (9–0)	West Virginia (8–1) (1)	Ohio State (11–1)	LSU (10–2)	Virginia Tech (11–2) (1)	Ohio State (11–2)	5.
6.	Florida	Wisconsin (1–0) т	Texas (2–0)	California (3–0)	California (4–0)	South Florida (4–0)	Oklahoma (5–1)	South Carolina (6–1)	West Virginia (6–1)	Arizona State (8–0) (2)	West Virginia (7–1)	Missouri (9–1)	Georgia (9–2)	Virginia Tech (10–2)	USC (10–2)	West Virginia (11–2)	6.
7.	Wisconsin	Texas (1–0)	Wisconsin (2–0)	Texas (3–0)	Texas (4–0)	Boston College (5–0)	South Carolina (5–1)	Oregon (5–1)	Arizona State (7–0) (1)	West Virginia (7–1)	Missouri (8–1)	Ohio State (10–1)	Arizona State (9–1)	Kansas (11–1)	Missouri (11–2)	Kansas (12–1) (1)	7.
8.	Oklahoma	Louisville (1–0)	California (2–0)	Ohio State (3–0)	Ohio State (4–0)	Kentucky (5–0)	West Virginia (5–1)	Kentucky (6–1)	Virginia Tech (6–1)	Kansas (8–0)	Boston College (8–1)	Georgia (8–2)	Virginia Tech (9–2)	USC (9–2)	Kansas (11–1)	Oklahoma (11–3)	8.
9.	Virginia Tech	Virginia Tech (1–0)	Louisville (2–0)	Wisconsin (3–0)	Wisconsin (4–0)	Florida (4–1)	Oregon (4–1)	West Virginia (5–1)	Florida (5–2) т	Missouri (7–1)	Arizona State (8–1)	Arizona State (9–1)	Oregon (8–2)	Oklahoma (10–2)	Florida (9–3)	Virginia Tech (11–3)	9.
10.	Louisville	California (1–0)	Ohio State (2–0)	Penn State (3–0)	Rutgers (3–0)	Oklahoma (4–1)	USC (4–1)	California (5–1)	USC (6–1) т	Georgia (6–2)	Georgia (7–2)	Virginia Tech (8–2)	Oklahoma (9–2)	Florida (9–3)	Hawaii (12–0) (1)	Boston College (11–3) т	10.
11.	Ohio State	Georgia (1–0)	UCLA (2–0)	Rutgers (3–0)	Oregon (4–0)	South Carolina (4–1)	Missouri (5–0)	Virginia Tech (6–1)	South Florida (6–1)	Virginia Tech (6–2)	Virginia Tech (7–2)	USC (8–2)	USC (8–2)	Hawaii (11–0)	West Virginia (10–2)	Texas (10–3) т	11.
12.	California	Ohio State (1-0)	Penn State (2–0)	South Carolina (3–0)	Boston College (4–0)	Georgia (4–1)	Virginia Tech (5–1)	Arizona State (7–0) (1)	Kansas (7–0)	Hawaii (8–0)	USC (7–2)	Texas (9–2)	Florida (8–3)	Boston College (10–2)	Arizona State (10–2)	Tennessee (10–4)	12.
13.	Georgia	UCLA (1–0)	Rutgers (2–0)	Oregon (3–0)	Clemson (4–0)	West Virginia (4–1)	Florida (4–2)	USC (5–1)	Missouri (6–1)	USC (6–2)	Michigan (8–2)	Hawaii (9–0)	Texas (9–2)	Arizona State (9–2)	Illinois (9–3)	Florida (9–4)	13.
14.	UCLA	Penn State (1–0)	Nebraska (2–0)	Boston College (3–0)	Kentucky (4–0)	Oregon (4–1)	Arizona State (6–0)	Florida (4–2)	Kentucky (6–2)	Texas (7–2)	Hawaii (8–0)	Florida (7–3)	Hawaii (10–0)	Tennessee (9–3)	Boston College (10–3)	BYU (11–2)	14.
15.	Tennessee	Rutgers (1–0)	Georgia Tech (2–0)	Clemson (3–0)	Georgia (3–1)	Virginia Tech (4–1)	Cincinnati (6–0)	Kansas (6–0) т	South Carolina (6–2)	Michigan (7–2)	Texas (8–2)	Clemson (8–2)	Boston College (9–2)	Illinois (9–3)	Clemson (9–3)	Auburn (9–4)	15.
16.	Rutgers	Nebraska (1–0)	Arkansas (1–0)	Alabama (3–0)	South Carolina (3–1)	Hawaii (5–0)	Hawaii (6–0)	Missouri (5–1) т	Hawaii (7–0)	Connecticut (7–1)	Connecticut (8–1)	Virginia (9–2)	Virginia (9–2)	Clemson (9–3)	Tennessee (9–4)	Arizona State (10–3)	16.
17.	Penn State	Auburn (1–0)	South Carolina (2–0)	Virginia Tech (2–1)	Virginia Tech (3–1)	Missouri (4–0)	Kentucky (5–1)	Hawaii (7–0)	Texas (6–2)	Alabama (6–2)	Florida (6–3)	Boise State (9–1)	Boise State (10–1)	Texas (9–3)	Texas (9–3)	Cincinnati (10–3)	17.
18.	Auburn	Arkansas (1–0)	Virginia Tech (1–1)	Louisville (2–1)	South Florida (3–0)	Arizona State (5–0)	Illinois (5–1)	Auburn (5–2)	California (5–2)	Florida (5–3)	Auburn (7–3)	Boston College (8–2)	Illinois (9–3)	Oregon (8–3)	Wisconsin (9–3)	Michigan (9–4)	18.
19.	Florida State	TCU (1–0)	Oregon (2–0)	Hawaii (3–0)	Hawaii (4–0)	Texas (4–1)	Wisconsin (5–1)	Texas (5–2)	Michigan (6–2)	Auburn (6–3)	Boise State (8–1)	Tennessee (7–3)	Tennessee (8–3)	Wisconsin (9–3)	BYU (10–2)	Hawaii (12–1)	19.
20.	Nebraska	Hawaii (1–0)	Clemson (2–0)	Texas A&M (3–0)	Missouri (4–0)	Cincinnati (5–0)	Kansas (5–0)	Tennessee (4–2)	Georgia (5–2)	South Florida (6–2)	Clemson (7–2)	Illinois (8–3)	Connecticut (9–2)	Cincinnati (9–3)	Cincinnati (9–3)	Illinois (9–4)	20.
21.	Arkansas	Georgia Tech (1–0)	Boston College (2–0)	Kentucky (3–0)	Penn State (3–1)	Rutgers (3–1)	Florida State (4–1)	Georgia (5–2)	Virginia (7–1)	Wake Forest (6–2)	Alabama (6–3)	Cincinnati (8–2)	Clemson (8–3)	BYU (9–2)	Virginia (9–3)	Clemson (9–4)	21.
22.	TCU	Boise State (1–0)	Tennessee (1–1)	Georgia (2–1)	Alabama (3–1)	Clemson (4–1)	Auburn (4–2)	Texas Tech (6–1)	Alabama (6–2)	Boise State (7–1)	Tennessee (6–3)	Kentucky (7–3)	Wisconsin (9–3)	Virginia (9–3)	Auburn (8–4)	Texas Tech (9–4)	22.
23.	Hawaii	Texas A&M (1–0)	Georgia (1–1)	South Florida (2–0)	Arizona State (4–0)	Purdue (5–0)	Texas (4–2)	Cincinnati (6–1)	Auburn (5–3)	South Carolina (6–3)	Virginia (8–2)	Michigan (8–3)	BYU (8–2)	Auburn (8–4)	South Florida (9–3)	Oregon (9–4)	23.
24.	Boise State	Tennessee (0–1)	Hawaii (2–0)	Nebraska (2–1)	Cincinnati (4–0)	Kansas State (3–1)	Georgia (4–2)	Michigan (5–2)	Penn State (6–2)	Tennessee (5–3)	California (6–3)	Wisconsin (8–3)	Cincinnati (8–3)	Boise State (10–2)	Boise State (10–2)	Wisconsin (9–4)	24.
25.	Texas A&M	Clemson (1–0)	Texas A&M (2–0)	Missouri (3–0)	Nebraska (3–1)	Nebraska (4–1)	Tennessee (3–2)	Kansas State (4–2)	Rutgers (5–2)	Clemson (6–2)	Kentucky (6–3)	Connecticut (8–2)	Auburn (7–4)	South Florida (9–3)	Arkansas (8–4)	Oregon State (9–4)	25.
	Preseason Aug 18	Week 1 Sept 4	Week 2 Sept 9	Week 3 Sept 16	Week 4 Sept 23	Week 5 Sept 30	Week 6 Oct 7	Week 7 Oct 14	Week 8 Oct 21	Week 9 Oct 28	Week 10 Nov 4	Week 11 Nov 11	Week 12 Nov 18	Week 13 Nov 25	Week 14 Dec 2	Week 15 (Final) Jan 8	
		Dropped: Michigan; Florida State	Dropped: Auburn; TCU; Boise State	Dropped: UCLA; Georgia Tech; Arkansas; Tennessee	Dropped: Louisville; Texas A&M	Dropped: Penn State; Alabama	Dropped: Rutgers; Clemson; Purdue; Kansas State; Nebraska	Dropped: Illinois; Wisconsin; Florida State	Dropped: Tennessee; Texas Tech; Cincinnati; Kansas State	Dropped: Kentucky; California; Virginia; Penn State; Rutgers	Dropped: South Florida; Wake Forest; South Carolina	Dropped: Alabama; Auburn; California	Dropped: Kentucky; Michigan	Dropped: Connecticut	Dropped: Oregon	Dropped: Virginia; South Florida; Boise State; Arkansas	

== Coaches Poll ==
	Preseason Aug 3	Week 1 Sept 4	Week 2 Sept 9	Week 3 Sept 16	Week 4 Sept 23	Week 5 Sept 30	Week 6 Oct 7	Week 7 Oct 14	Week 8 Oct 21	Week 9 Oct 28	Week 10 Nov 4	Week 11 Nov 11	Week 12 Nov 18	Week 13 Nov 25	Week 14 December 2	Week 15 (Final) Jan 7	
1.	USC (45)	USC (1–0) (49)	USC (1–0) (42)	USC (2–0) (44)	USC (3–0) (44)	USC (4–0) (45)	LSU (6–0) (58)	Ohio State (7–0) (56)	Ohio State (8–0) (58)	Ohio State (9–0) (56)	Ohio State (10–0) (55)	LSU (9–1) (35)	LSU (10–1) (51)	West Virginia (10–1) (37)	Ohio State (11–1) (46)	LSU (12–2) (60)	1.
2.	LSU (4)	LSU (1–0) (4)	LSU (2–0) (11)	LSU (3–0) (8)	LSU (4–0) (8)	LSU (5–0) (14)	California (5–0)	Boston College (7–0) (1)	Boston College (7–0) (2)	Boston College (8–0) (3)	LSU (8–1) (1)	Oregon (8–1) (13)	Kansas (11–0) (8)	Missouri (11–1) (17)	LSU (11–2) (11)	USC (11–2)	2.
3.	Florida (9)	Florida (1–0) (7)	Florida (2–0) (7)	Florida (3–0) (7)	Florida (4–0) (4)	California (5–0)	Ohio State (6–0) (2)	South Florida (6–0) (3)	LSU (7–1)	LSU (7–1)	Oregon (8–1) (2)	Oklahoma (9–1) (4)	West Virginia (9–1) (1)	Ohio State (11–1) (6)	Oklahoma (11–2) (2)	Georgia (11–2)	3.
4.	Texas	West Virginia (1–0)	West Virginia (2–0)	Oklahoma (3–0) (1)	Oklahoma (4–0) (4)	Ohio State (5–0) (1)	Boston College (6–0)	Oklahoma (6–1)	Oklahoma (7–1)	Oregon (7–1) (1)	Oklahoma (8–1) (2)	Kansas (10–0) (7)	Missouri (10–1)	Georgia (10–2)	Georgia (10–2)	Ohio State (11–2)	4.
5.	Michigan (2)	Wisconsin (1–0)	Oklahoma (2–0)	West Virginia (3–0)	West Virginia (4–0)	Wisconsin (5–0)	Oklahoma (5–1) т	LSU (6–1)	Oregon (6–1)	Oklahoma (7–1)	Kansas (9–0)	West Virginia (8–1) (1)	Ohio State (11–1)	Kansas (11–1) т	Virginia Tech (11–2)	Missouri (12–2)	5.
6.	West Virginia	Oklahoma (1–0)	Texas (2–0)	Texas (3–0)	California (4–0)	Boston College (5–0)	South Florida (5–0) т	Oregon (5–1)	West Virginia (6–1)	Arizona State (8–0)	West Virginia (7–1)	Missouri (9–1)	Arizona State (9–1)	Virginia Tech (10–2) т	USC (10–2)	West Virginia (11–2)	6.
7.	Wisconsin	Texas (1–0)	Wisconsin (2–0)	Wisconsin (3–0)	Texas (4–0)	Florida (4–1)	USC (4–1)	West Virginia (5–1)	Arizona State (7–0)	West Virginia (7–1)	Missouri (8–1)	Ohio State (10–1)	Georgia (9–2)	LSU (10–2)	Missouri (11–2)	Kansas (12–1)	7.
8.	Oklahoma	Louisville (1–0)	California (2–0)	California (3–0)	Ohio State (4–0)	Kentucky (5–0)	Oregon (4–1)	South Carolina (6–1)	USC (6–1)	Kansas (8–0)	Boston College (8–1)	Arizona State (9–1)	Virginia Tech (9–2)	Oklahoma (10–2)	Kansas (11–1)	Oklahoma (11–3)	8.
9.	Virginia Tech	Virginia Tech (1–0)	Louisville (2–0)	Ohio State (3–0)	Wisconsin (4–0)	South Florida (4–0)	West Virginia (5–1)	California (5–1) т	Virginia Tech (6–1)	Missouri (7–1)	Arizona State (8–1)	Georgia (8–1)	Oklahoma (9–2)	USC (9–2)	West Virginia (10–2)	Virginia Tech (11–3)	9.
10.	Ohio State	California (1–0)	Ohio State (2–0)	Penn State (3–0)	Rutgers (3–0)	Oklahoma (4–1)	Virginia Tech (5–1)	USC (5–1) т	Kansas (7–0)	Georgia (6–2)	Georgia (7–2)	Virginia Tech (8–2)	Oregon (8–2)	Hawaii (11–0)	Hawaii (12–0) (1)	Texas (10–3)	10.
11.	Louisville	Ohio State (1–0)	UCLA (2–0)	Rutgers (3–0)	Boston College (4–0)	Georgia (4–1)	Missouri (5–0)	Virginia Tech (6–1)	Florida (5–2)	Hawaii (8–0)	Virginia Tech (7–2)	Texas (9–2)	Texas (9–2)	Florida (9–3)	Arizona State (10–2)	Boston College (11–3)	11.
12.	California	Georgia (1–0)	Penn State (2–0)	Boston College (3–0)	Oregon (4–0)	West Virginia (4–1)	South Carolina (5–1)	Arizona State (7–0)	South Florida (6–1)	Texas (7–2)	Hawaii (8–0)	Hawaii (9–0)	USC (8–2)	Boston College (10–2)	Florida (9–3)	Tennessee (10–4)	12.
13.	Georgia	Auburn (1–0)	Rutgers (2–0)	Oregon (3–0)	Clemson (4–0)	Oregon (4–1)	Arizona State (6–0)	Kentucky (6–1)	Missouri (6–1)	Virginia Tech (6–2)	Michigan (8–2)	USC (8–2)	Hawaii (10–0)	Arizona State (9–2)	Illinois (9–3)	Arizona State (10–3)	13.
14.	Auburn	UCLA (1–0)	Nebraska (2–0)	Clemson (3–0) т	Virginia Tech (3–1)	Virginia Tech (4–1)	Florida (4–2)	Florida (4–2)	Hawaii (7–0)	Michigan (7–2)	Texas (8–2)	Florida (7–3)	Florida (8–3)	Illinois (9–3)	Boston College (10–3)	Auburn (9–4) т	14.
15.	Tennessee	Penn State (1–0)	Georgia Tech (2–0)	South Carolina (3–0) т	Kentucky (4–0)	Hawaii (5–0)	Wisconsin (5–1)	Kansas (6–0)	Kentucky (6–2)	USC (6–2)	USC (7–2)	Boise State (9–1)	Virginia (9–2)	Tennessee (9–3)	Wisconsin (9–3)	BYU (11–2) т	15.
16.	Rutgers	Rutgers (1–0)	Arkansas (1–0)	Texas A&M (3–0)	Georgia (3–1)	Texas (4–1)	Hawaii (6–0)	Hawaii (7–0)	Texas (6–2)	Auburn (6–3)	Connecticut (8–1)	Clemson (8–2)	Boston College (9–2)	Wisconsin (9–3)	Clemson (9–3)	Florida (9–4)	16.
17.	UCLA	Nebraska (1–0)	Virginia Tech (1–1)	Virginia Tech (2–1)	Hawaii (4–0)	Missouri (4–0)	Cincinnati (6–0)	Missouri (5–1)	South Carolina (6–2)	Florida (5–3)	Auburn (7–3)	Virginia (9–2)	Boise State (10–1)	Clemson (9–3)	Texas (9–3)	Hawaii (12–1)	17.
18.	Penn State	Arkansas (1–0)	Texas A&M (2–0)	Hawaii (3–0)	South Florida (3–0)	South Carolina (4–1)	Kentucky (5–1)	Texas (5–2)	Virginia (7–1)	Alabama (6–2)	Florida (6–3)	Boston College (8–2)	Illinois (9–3)	Texas (9–3)	Tennessee (9–4)	Illinois (9–4)	18.
19.	Nebraska	TCU (1–0)	Boston College (2–0)	Louisville (2–1)	Penn State (3–1)	Arizona State (5–0)	Illinois (5–1)	Auburn (5–2)	Georgia (5–2)	Wisconsin (7–2)	Boise State (8–1)	Tennessee (7–3)	Tennessee (8–3)	BYU (9–2)	BYU (10–2)	Michigan (9–4)	19.
20.	Arkansas	Boise State (1–0)	Clemson (2–0)	Alabama (3–0)	Missouri (4–0)	Purdue (5–0)	Kansas (5–0)	Georgia (5–2)	California (5–2)	Connecticut (7–1)	Clemson (7–2)	Kentucky (7–3)	Wisconsin (9–3)	Oregon (8–3)	Virginia (9–3)	Cincinnati (10–3)	20.
21.	Florida State	Georgia Tech (1–0)	Oregon (2–0)	Georgia (2–1)	South Carolina (3–1)	Rutgers (3–1)	Florida State (4–1)	Texas Tech (6–1)	Michigan (6–2)	South Florida (6–2)	Virginia (8–2)	Illinois (8–3)	Connecticut (9–2)	Auburn (8–4) т	Auburn (8–4)	Wisconsin (9–4)	21.
22.	TCU	Hawaii (1–0)	Hawaii (2–0)	Nebraska (2–1)	Nebraska (3–1)	Clemson (4–1)	Texas (4–2)	Tennessee (4–2)	Penn State (6–2)	Boise State (7–1)	Kentucky (6–3)	Penn State (8–3)	Clemson (8–3)	Virginia (9–3) т	Boise State (10–2)	Clemson (9–4)	22.
23.	Boise State	Texas A&M (1–0)	South Carolina (2–0)	Kentucky (3–0)	Michigan State (4–0)	Nebraska (4–1)	Georgia (4–2)	Cincinnati (6–1)	Auburn (5–3)	Kentucky (6–3)	Alabama (6–3)	Michigan (8–3)	BYU (8–2)	Boise State (10–2)	Cincinnati (9–3)	Texas Tech (9–4)	23.
24.	Hawaii	Tennessee (0–1)	Tennessee (1–1)	South Florida (2–0)	Alabama (3–1)	Cincinnati (5–0)	Purdue (5–1)	Virginia (6–1)	Alabama (6–2)	Clemson (6–2)	Tennessee (6–3)	Wisconsin (8–3)	Texas Tech (8–4)	Cincinnati (9–3)	Arkansas (8–4)	Oregon (9–4)	24.
25.	Texas A&M	Boston College (1–0)	Georgia (1–1)	Missouri (3–0)	Arizona State (4–0) т; Purdue (4–0) т	UCLA (4–1)	Auburn (4–1)	Penn State (5–2)	Wisconsin (6–2)	South Carolina (6–3)	Penn State (7–3)	Cincinnati (8–2)	Auburn (7–4)	Arkansas (8–4)	South Florida (9–3)	Penn State (9–4)	25.
	Preseason Aug 3	Week 1 Sept 4	Week 2 Sept 9	Week 3 Sept 16	Week 4 Sept 23	Week 5 Sept 30	Week 6 Oct 7	Week 7 Oct 14	Week 8 Oct 21	Week 9 Oct 28	Week 10 Nov 4	Week 11 Nov 11	Week 12 Nov 18	Week 13 Nov 25	Week 14 December 2	Week 15 (Final) Jan 7	
		Dropped: Michigan; Florida State	Dropped: Auburn; TCU; Boise State	Dropped: UCLA; Georgia Tech; Arkansas; Tennessee	Dropped: Texas A&M; Louisville	Dropped: Penn State; Michigan State; Alabama	Dropped: Rutgers; Clemson; Nebraska; UCLA	Dropped: Wisconsin; Illinois; Florida State; Purdue	Dropped: Texas Tech; Tennessee; Cincinnati	Dropped: Virginia; California; Penn State	Dropped: Wisconsin; South Florida; South Carolina	Dropped: Connecticut; Auburn; Alabama	Dropped: Kentucky; Penn State; Michigan; Cincinnati	Dropped: Connecticut; Texas Tech	Dropped: Oregon	Dropped: Virginia; Boise State; Arkansas; South Florida	

== Harris Interactive Poll ==
	Week 4 Sept 23	Week 5 Sept 30	Week 6 Oct 7	Week 7 Oct 14	Week 8 Oct 21	Week 9 Oct 28	Week 10 Nov 4	Week 11 Nov 11	Week 12 Nov 18	Week 13 Nov 25	Week 14 (Final) Dec 2	
1.	USC (3–0) (91)	USC (4–0) (76)	LSU (6–0) (113)	Ohio State (7–0) (110)	Ohio State (8–0) (111)	Ohio State (9–0) (114)	Ohio State (10–0) (112)	LSU (9–1) (73)	LSU (10–1) (100)	Missouri (11–1) (57)	Ohio State (11–1) (98)	1.
2.	LSU (4–0) (19)	LSU (5–0) (36)	California (5–0)	Boston College (7–0)	Boston College (7–0) (1)	Boston College (8–0)	LSU (8–1)	Oregon (8–1) (22)	Kansas (11–0) (13)	West Virginia (10–1) (45)	LSU (11–2) (7)	2.
3.	Oklahoma (4–0) (1)	California (5–0)	Ohio State (6–0)	South Florida (6–0) (2)	LSU (7–1) (2)	LSU (7–1)	Oregon (8–1) (1)	Oklahoma (9–1) (9)	Missouri (10–1) т	Ohio State (11–1) (11)	Oklahoma (11–2) (6)	3.
4.	Florida (4–0) (3)	Ohio State (5–0)	Boston College (6–0)	Oklahoma (6–1)	Oklahoma (7–1)	Oklahoma (7–1)	Oklahoma (8–1)	Kansas (10–0) (8)	West Virginia (9–1) т	Georgia (10–2)	Georgia (10–2) (1)	4.
5.	West Virginia (4–0)	Wisconsin (5–0)	Oklahoma (5–1)	LSU (6–1) (1)	Oregon (6–1)	Oregon (7–1)	Kansas (9–0)	West Virginia (8–1)	Ohio State (11–1)	LSU (10–2)	USC (10–2)	5.
6.	California (4–0)	Boston College (5–0)	South Florida (5–0)	South Carolina (6–1)	West Virginia (6–1)	Arizona State (8–0)	West Virginia (7–1)	Missouri (9–1)	Arizona State (9–1)	Kansas (11–1)	Virginia Tech (11–2) (1)	6.
7.	Ohio State (4–0)	Kentucky (5–0)	USC (4–1)	Oregon (5–1)	USC (6–1)	West Virginia (7–1)	Missouri (8–1)	Ohio State (10–1)	Georgia (9–2)	Virginia Tech (10–2)	Missouri (11–2)	7.
8.	Texas (4–0)	Florida (4–1)	West Virginia (5–1)	West Virginia (5–1)	Arizona State (7–0)	Kansas (8–0)	Boston College (8–1)	Arizona State (9–1)	Virginia Tech (9–2)	Oklahoma (10–2)	Kansas (11–1)	8.
9.	Wisconsin (4–0)	Oklahoma (4–1)	South Carolina (5–1)	USC (5–1)	Florida (5–2)	Missouri (7–1)	Arizona State (8–1)	Georgia (8–2)	Oklahoma (9–2)	USC (9–2)	West Virginia (10–2)	9.
10.	Oregon (4–0)	South Florida (4–0)	Oregon (4–1)	California (5–1)	Virginia Tech (6–1)	Hawaii (8–0)	Hawaii (8–0)	Virginia Tech (8–2)	Oregon (8–2)	Hawaii (11–0) (1)	Hawaii (12–0) (1)	10.
11.	Boston College (4–0)	West Virginia (4–1)	Missouri (5–0)	Kentucky (6–1)	Kansas (7–0)	Texas (7–2)	Georgia (7–2)	Hawaii (9–0)	Texas (9–2)	Florida (9–3)	Florida (9–3)	11.
12.	Rutgers (3–0)	Georgia (4–1)	Virginia Tech (5–1)	Arizona State (7–0) (1)	South Florida (6–1)	Georgia (6–2)	Texas (8–2)	Texas (9–2)	USC (8–2)	Boston College (10–2)	Arizona State (10–2)	12.
13.	Clemson (4–0)	Oregon (4–1)	Florida (4–2)	Virginia Tech (6–1)	Missouri (6–1)	USC (6–2)	Virginia Tech (7–2)	USC (8–2)	Hawaii (10–0)	Arizona State (9–2)	Illinois (9–3)	13.
14.	Kentucky (4–0)	South Carolina (4–1)	Arizona State (6–0)	Florida (4–2)	Hawaii (7–0)	Virginia Tech (6–2)	USC (7–2)	Florida (7–3)	Florida (8–3)	Illinois (9–3)	Boston College (10–3)	14.
15.	Georgia (3–1)	Virginia Tech (4–1)	Wisconsin (5–1)	Kansas (6–0)	Kentucky (6–2)	Michigan (7–2)	Michigan (8–2)	Boise State (9–1)	Boise State (10–1)	Tennessee (9–3)	Wisconsin (9–3)	15.
16.	Virginia Tech (3–1)	Hawaii (5–0)	Hawaii (6–0)	Hawaii (7–0)	Texas (6–2)	Florida (5–3)	Connecticut (8–1)	Clemson (8–2)	Boston College (9–2)	Wisconsin (9–3)	Clemson (9–3)	16.
17.	South Carolina (3–1)	Texas (4–1)	Cincinnati (6–0)	Missouri (5–1)	South Carolina (6–2)	Alabama (6–2)	Florida (6–3)	Virginia (9–2)	Virginia (9–2)	Texas (9–3)	Texas (9–3)	17.
18.	Hawaii (4–0)	Missouri (4–0)	Kentucky (5–1)	Texas (5–2)	California (5–2)	Auburn (6–3)	Auburn (7–3)	Boston College (8–2)	Illinois (9–3)	Clemson (9–3)	BYU (10–2)	18.
19.	Penn State (3–1)	Arizona State (5–0)	Illinois (5–1)	Auburn (5–2)	Georgia (5–2)	Connecticut (7–1)	Boise State (8–1)	Tennessee (7–3)	Tennessee (8–3)	Oregon (8–3)	Tennessee (9–4)	19.
20.	South Florida (3–0)	Purdue (5–0)	Kansas (5–0)	Georgia (5–2)	Virginia (7–1)	South Florida (6–2)	Clemson (7–2)	Illinois (8–3)	Wisconsin (9–3)	BYU (9–2)	Cincinnati (9–3)	20.
21.	Missouri (4–0)	Rutgers (3–1)	Texas (4–2)	Texas Tech (6–1)	Michigan (6–2)	Wisconsin (7–2)	Virginia (8–2)	Kentucky (7–3)	Connecticut (9–2)	Cincinnati (9–3)	Virginia (9–3)	21.
22.	Alabama (3–1)	Clemson (4–1)	Florida State (4–1)	Tennessee (4–2)	Penn State (6–2)	Boise State (7–1)	Alabama (6–3)	Michigan (8–3)	Clemson (8–3)	Boise State (10–2)	Boise State (10–2)	22.
23.	Arizona State (4–0)	Nebraska (4–1)	Georgia (4–2)	Cincinnati (6–1)	Auburn (5–3)	South Carolina (6–3)	Kentucky (6–3)	Wisconsin (8–3)	BYU (8–2)	Virginia (9–3)	Auburn (8–4)	23.
24.	Nebraska (3–1)	Cincinnati (5–0)	Purdue (5–1)	Virginia (6–1)	Alabama (6–2)	Kentucky (6–3)	Tennessee (6–3)	Cincinnati (8–2)	Cincinnati (8–3)	Auburn (8–4)	South Florida (9–3)	24.
25.	Michigan State (4–0)	Michigan State (4–1)	Auburn (4–2)	Michigan (5–2)	Rutgers (5–2)	Wake Forest (6–2)	California (6–3)	Penn State (8–3)	Auburn (7–4)	South Florida (9–3)	Arkansas (8–4)	25.
	Week 4 Sept 23	Week 5 Sept 30	Week 6 Oct 7	Week 7 Oct 14	Week 8 Oct 21	Week 9 Oct 28	Week 10 Nov 4	Week 11 Nov 11	Week 12 Nov 18	Week 13 Nov 25	Week 14 (Final) Dec 2	
		Dropped: Penn State; Alabama	Dropped: Clemson; Michigan State; Nebraska; Rutgers	Dropped: Florida State; Illinois; Purdue; Wisconsin	Dropped: Cincinnati; Tennessee; Texas Tech	Dropped: California; Virginia; Penn State; Rutgers	Dropped: Wisconsin; South Carolina; South Florida; Wake Forest	Dropped: Connecticut; Auburn; Alabama; California	Dropped: Kentucky; Michigan; Penn State	Dropped: Connecticut	Dropped: Oregon	

== BCS standings ==
The Bowl Championship Series (BCS) determined the two teams that competed in the 2008 BCS National Championship Game.

	Week 7 Oct 14	Week 8 Oct 21	Week 9 Oct 28	Week 10 Nov 4	Week 11 Nov 11	Week 12 Nov 18	Week 13 Nov 25	Week 14 (Final) Dec 2	
1.	Ohio State (7–0)	Ohio State (8–0)	Ohio State (9–0)	Ohio State (10–0)	LSU (9–1)	LSU (10–1)	Missouri (11–1)	Ohio State (11–1)	1.
2.	South Florida (6–0)	Boston College (7–0)	Boston College (8–0)	LSU (8–1)	Oregon (8–1)	Kansas (11–0)	West Virginia (10–1)	LSU (11–2)	2.
3.	Boston College (7–0)	LSU (7–1)	LSU (7–1)	Oregon (8–1)	Kansas (10–0)	West Virginia (9–1)	Ohio State (11–1)	Virginia Tech (11–2)	3.
4.	LSU (6–1)	Arizona State (7–0)	Arizona State (8–0)	Kansas (9–0)	Oklahoma (9–1)	Missouri (10–1)	Georgia (10–2)	Oklahoma (11–2)	4.
5.	Oklahoma (6–1)	Oregon (6–1)	Oregon (7–1)	Oklahoma (8–1)	Missouri (9–1)	Ohio State (11–1)	Kansas (11–1)	Georgia (10–2)	5.
6.	South Carolina (6–1)	Oklahoma (7–1)	Oklahoma (7–1)	Missouri (8–1)	West Virginia (8–1)	Arizona State (9–1)	Virginia Tech (10–2)	Missouri (11–2)	6.
7.	Kentucky (6–1)	West Virginia (6–1)	West Virginia (7–1)	West Virginia (7–1)	Ohio State (10–1)	Georgia (9–2)	LSU (10–2)	USC (10–2)	7.
8.	Arizona State (7–0)	Virginia Tech (6–1)	Kansas (8–0)	Boston College (8–1)	Arizona State (9–1)	Virginia Tech (9–2)	USC (9–2)	Kansas (11–1)	8.
9.	West Virginia (5–1)	Kansas (7–0)	Missouri (7–1)	Arizona State (8–1)	Georgia (8–2)	Oregon (8–2)	Oklahoma (10–2)	West Virginia (10–2)	9.
10.	Oregon (5–1)	South Florida (6–1)	Georgia (6–2)	Georgia (7–2)	Virginia Tech (8–2)	Oklahoma (9–2)	Florida (9–3)	Hawaii (12–0)	10.
11.	Virginia Tech (6–1)	Florida (5–2)	Virginia Tech (6–2)	Virginia Tech (7–2)	USC (8–2)	USC (8–2)	Boston College (10–2)	Arizona State (10–2)	11.
12.	California (5–1)	USC (6–1)	Michigan (7–2)	Michigan (8–2)	Florida (7–3)	Florida (8–3)	Hawaii (11–0)	Florida (9–3)	12.
13.	Kansas (6–0)	Missouri (6–1)	Connecticut (7–1)	Connecticut (8–1)	Texas (9–2)	Texas (9–2)	Arizona State (9–2)	Illinois (9–3)	13.
14.	USC (5–1)	Kentucky (6–2)	Hawaii (8–0)	Texas (8–2)	Virginia (9–2)	Boston College (9–2)	Tennessee (9–3)	Boston College (10–3)	14.
15.	Florida (4–2)	Virginia (7–1)	Texas (7–2)	Florida (6–3)	Clemson (8–2)	Hawaii (10–0)	Illinois (9–3)	Clemson (9–3)	15.
16.	Missouri (5–1)	South Carolina (6–2)	Auburn (6–3)	Hawaii (8–0)	Hawaii (9–0)	Virginia (9–2)	Clemson (9–3)	Tennessee (9–4)	16.
17.	Auburn (5–2)	Hawaii (7–0)	Alabama (6–2)	USC (7–2)	Boston College (8–2)	Illinois (9–3)	Oregon (8–3)	BYU (10–2)	17.
18.	Hawaii (7–0)	Georgia (5–2)	South Florida (6–2)	Auburn (7–3)	Boise State (9–1)	Tennessee (8–3)	Wisconsin (9–3)	Wisconsin (9–3)	18.
19.	Virginia (6–1)	Texas (6–2)	USC (6–2)	Virginia (8–2)	Illinois (8–3)	Boise State (10–1)	BYU (9–2)	Texas (9–3)	19.
20.	Georgia (5–2)	Michigan (6–2)	Florida (5–3)	Boise State (8–1)	Tennessee (7–3)	Connecticut (9–2)	Texas (9–3)	Virginia (9–3)	20.
21.	Tennessee (4–2)	California (5–2)	Wisconsin (7–2)	Clemson (7–2)	Michigan (8–3)	Wisconsin (9–3)	South Florida (9–3)	South Florida (9–3)	21.
22.	Texas (5–2)	Auburn (5–3)	Boise State (7–1)	Alabama (6–3)	Cincinnati (8–2)	Clemson (8–3)	Virginia (9–3)	Cincinnati (9–3)	22.
23.	Cincinnati (6–1)	Connecticut (6–1)	Virginia (7–2)	Penn State (7–3)	Kentucky (7–3)	South Florida (8–3)	Cincinnati (9–3)	Auburn (8–4)	23.
24.	Texas Tech (6–1)	Alabama (6–2)	Wake Forest (6–2)	Tennessee (6–3)	Connecticut (8–2)	Cincinnati (8–3)	Auburn (8–4)	Boise State (10–2)	24.
25.	Michigan (5–2)	Penn State (6–2)	Clemson (6–2)	Kentucky (6–3)	Wisconsin (8–3)	BYU (8–2)	Boise State (10–2)	Connecticut (9–3)	25.
	Week 7 Oct 14	Week 8 Oct 21	Week 9 Oct 28	Week 10 Nov 4	Week 11 Nov 11	Week 12 Nov 18	Week 13 Nov 25	Week 14 (Final) Dec 2	
		Dropped: Tennessee; Cincinnati; Texas Tech	Dropped: Kentucky; South Carolina; California; Penn State	Dropped: South Florida; Wisconsin; Wake Forest	Dropped: Auburn; Alabama; Penn State	Dropped: Michigan; Kentucky	Dropped: Connecticut	Dropped: Oregon	
