= 2008 Fiesta Bowl =

2008 Tostitos Fiesta Bowl
- BCS Bowl Game; 37th Fiesta Bowl
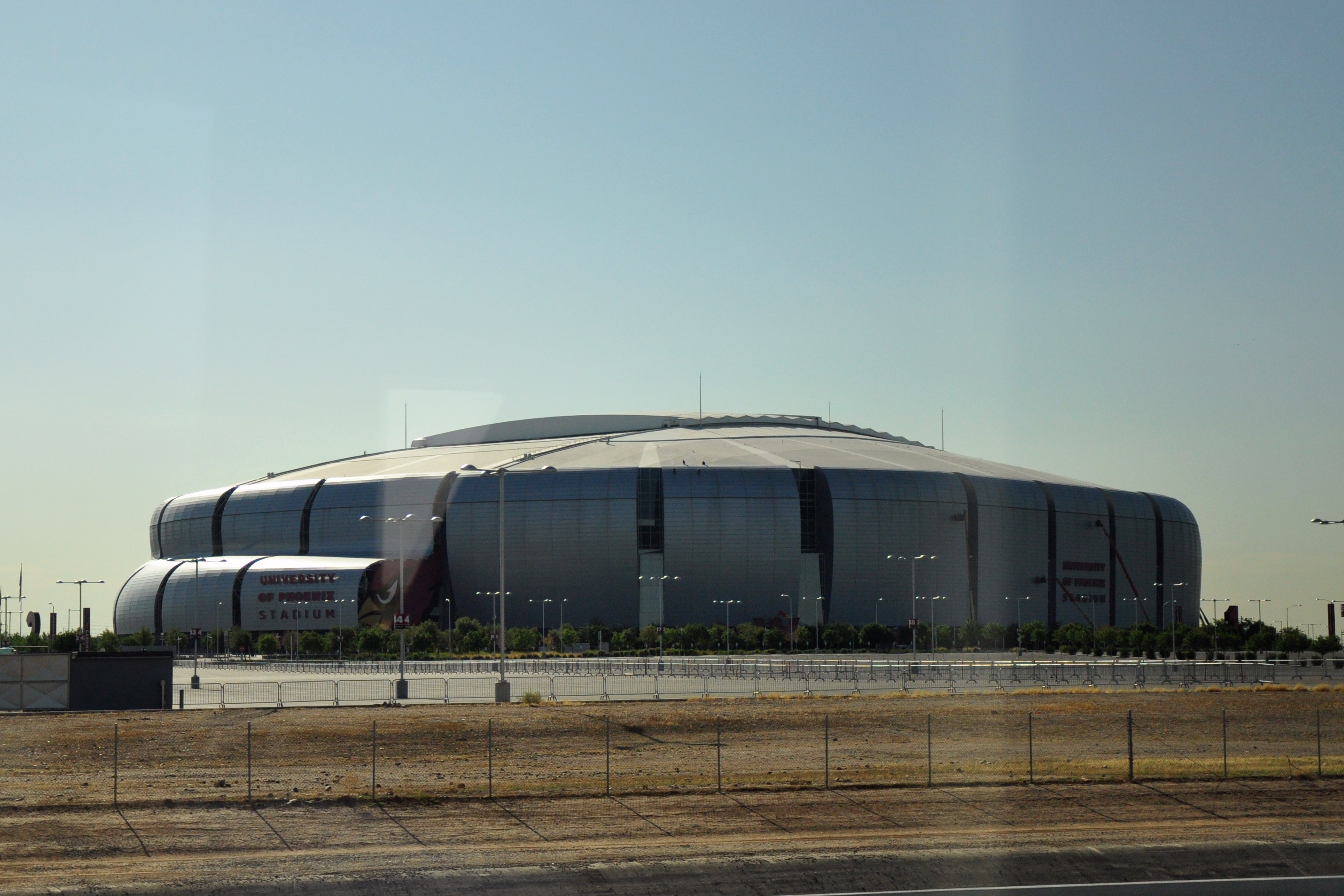
- University of Phoenix Stadium in Glendale, Arizona, hosted the Fiesta Bowl.
West Virginia Mountaineers	Oklahoma Sooners
(10–2)	(11–2)
Big East	Big 12
48	28
Head coach: Bill Stewart (interim)	Head coach: Bob Stoops
AP / Coaches / BCS; 11 / 9 / 9	AP / Coaches / BCS; 3 / 3 / 4
	1	2	3	4	Total
West Virginia	6	14	14	14	48
Oklahoma	0	6	9	13	28
- Date: January 2, 2008
- Season: 2007
- Stadium: University of Phoenix Stadium
- Location: Glendale, Arizona
- MVP: Offense: Pat White; Defense: Reed Williams
- Favorite: Oklahoma by 8
- National anthem: Frankie Valli and the Four Seasons
- Referee: Steve Shaw (SEC)
- Attendance: 70,016
- Payout: US$17 million per team

United States TV coverage
- Network: FOX
- Announcers: Matt Vasgersian, Terry Donahue, Pat Haden, Laura Okmin
- Nielsen ratings: 7.7

The 2008 Tostitos Fiesta Bowl was a college football bowl game. It was part of the 2007–2008 Bowl Championship Series (BCS) of the 2007 NCAA Division I FBS football season. Played annually since 1971, first at Sun Devil Stadium on the campus of Arizona State University in Tempe, Arizona through 2006, the game was played at 8 p.m. EST on January 2, 2008, at the University of Phoenix Stadium in Glendale, Arizona. The game featured the fourth ranked (BCS), Big 12 champion Oklahoma Sooners hosting the ninth ranked (BCS), Big East champion West Virginia Mountaineers. West Virginia defeated Oklahoma by a score of 48–28. The contest was televised on Fox.

== Season summaries ==
=== Oklahoma ===
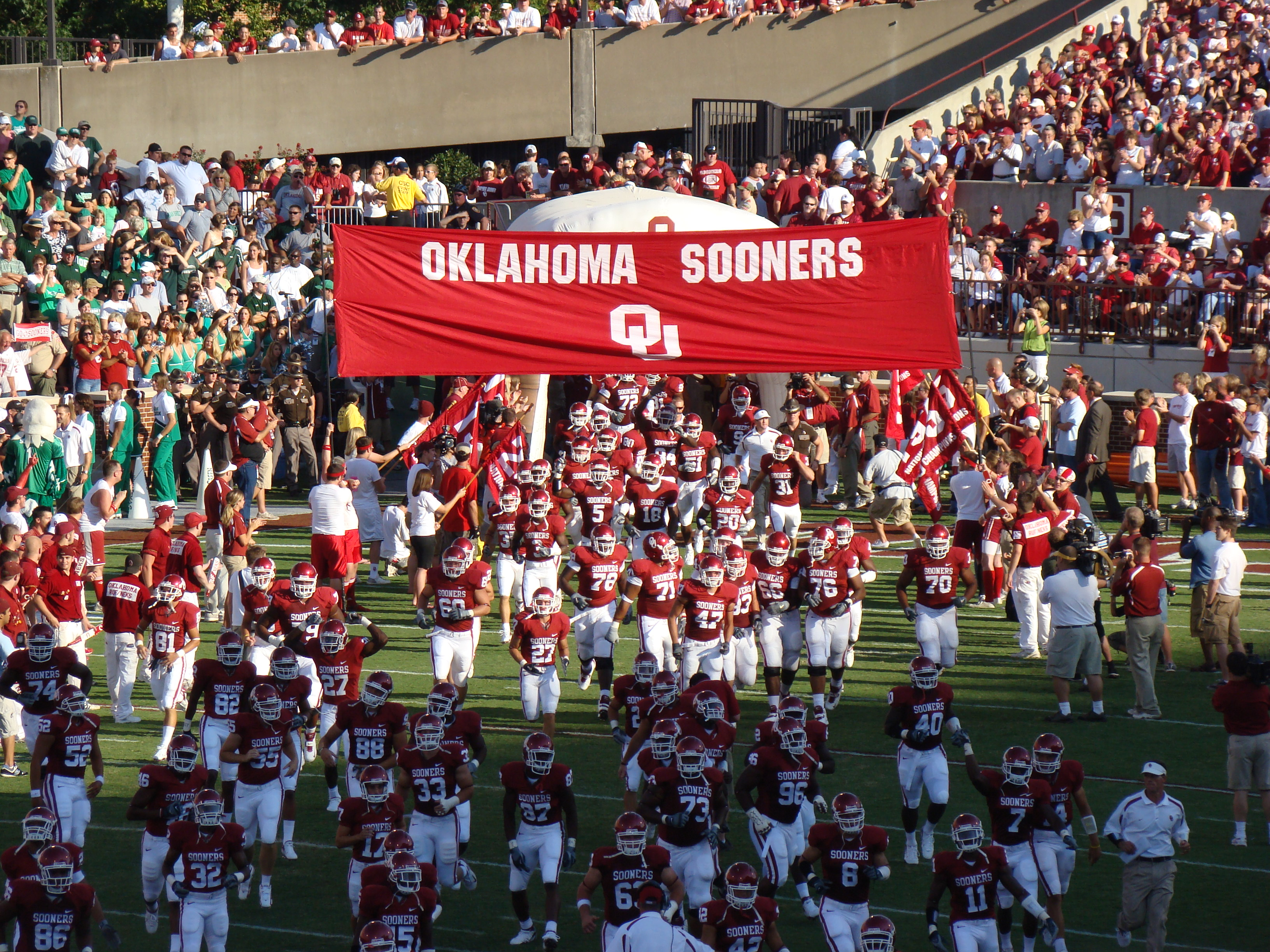
The 2007 Oklahoma Sooners football team enters the field for the first game of the season on September 1

In the preseason, Oklahoma was picked by the Big 12 media to finish second in the conference. At the time, the starting quarterback had not been chosen. A little over a week before the first game, freshman quarterback Sam Bradford was announced as the starter. In his first game as a collegiate quarterback, Bradford threw for over 350 yards in the first half, he tied Heisman Trophy winner Jason White's record of 18 consecutive pass completions, and threw for five touchdowns. He came out of the game early in the 3rd quarter. Since then, Bradford led the nation in passing efficiency for most of the season. With the question at quarterback answered, some felt this team could be the best in the nation, but with an unexpected loss at Colorado, the chances were slim. The Sooners continued to play strong following the loss and again rose in the polls as more teams above them also lost. Back in the #3 spot, the Sooners traveled to Lubbock, Texas to take on the Red Raiders to clinch the Big 12 South Division title. However, Bradford was injured on the opening play for the Sooners as they quickly fell behind. It was 27–10 at the halftime. Oklahoma mounted a comeback in the 4th quarter but it was not enough. The Sooners lost their second game and again were knocked out of the national title picture. In their next game against Oklahoma State, in what is referred to as Bedlam, the Sooners dominated winning 49–17 and locking up their spot in the Big 12 Championship Game. In the Big 12 Championship, Oklahoma faced Missouri, then the number one ranked team in the nation. The two faced each other in the regular season in Norman, Oklahoma with the Sooners winning 41–31. The Sooner defense dominated the game and the offense pulled away in the 2nd half. Oklahoma won 38–17 to claim their 5th Big 12 Conference Championship and 41st total conference championship.

=== West Virginia ===
West Virginia was picked by the Big East media to finish first in the conference and they did just that. Nationally, West Virginia was among the favorites to win a national championship from the beginning. In the preseason AP Poll, West Virginia was ranked third and received one first place vote. In the Coaches Poll, they were picked sixth. They started the season ranked higher than Oklahoma in both polls (Oklahoma was #8 in both polls). The Mountaineers were led on offense by quarterback Pat White and running back Steve Slaton, both juniors and both on many preseason Heisman Trophy watchlists. West Virginia hit their first stumbling block against then-#18 South Florida in late September. They rebounded with six consecutive wins including a win over the Connecticut Huskies which clinched at least a share of the Big East title for West Virginia. West Virginia only needed one more win to also clinch a spot in the national championship game. In their last game of the regular season, the 100th Backyard Brawl at Mountaineer Field in Morgantown, West Virginia, the #2 ranked Mountaineers suffered an upset when they were defeated by unranked Pittsburgh 9–13. West Virginia, who were a four touchdown favorite, played about half of the game without White after he dislocated his thumb late in the first half. The loss meant West Virginia were Co-Champs of the Big East along with Connecticut but received the bowl bid since they defeated Connecticut 66–21 the previous week.

== Selection process ==
Beginning with the 1998 football season, when the Bowl Championship Series began, the winner of the Big 12 Conference was contractually assigned to play in the Fiesta Bowl, unless ranked in the top two in which they would play in the national championship game. By winning the conference but not finishing ranked in the top two, Oklahoma was automatically assigned to the Fiesta Bowl. With Oklahoma guaranteed to play in the Fiesta Bowl, the bowl committee still had an at-large team to select.

Per the BCS selection procedure, the bowl games that lost teams to the national championship get first picks for a replacement. The Rose Bowl, after losing top ranked Ohio State, selected Illinois. Next, the Sugar Bowl selected Georgia to replace the #2 LSU Tigers. For the second selection for each bowl, per the BCS selection procedure, the game played nearest the date of the national championship had the first pick. For 2008, this was the Orange Bowl, which selected Kansas. Following the Orange Bowl's select, the Fiesta Bowl had the next pick following lastly by the Sugar Bowl. The Fiesta Bowl committee had a few teams to select from including Arizona State, Hawaiʻi, and Big East champion West Virginia. The committee chose to invite West Virginia who almost made the national championship game before losing their last regular season game. John Junker, CEO of the Fiesta Bowl, said "the selection we had was very simple." If West Virginia had not been selected by the Fiesta Bowl, the Sugar Bowl would have been forced to select them, as West Virginia was guaranteed a BCS bowl berth by virtue of winning the Big East.

== Pre-game buildup ==
This game marked Oklahoma's fourth trip to the Fiesta Bowl. Oklahoma defeated Wyoming in 1976 before losing to Arizona State in 1982 and in overtime to Boise State in 2007. West Virginia made their second trip to the Fiesta Bowl. Their only other trip was in 1989 when they lost the national championship game to Notre Dame. This was also the fourth time these two programs have played each other, but the first time in postseason. Oklahoma defeated West Virginia in 1958, by a score of 47–14, and in 1977, by a score of 51–10. West Virginia defeated Oklahoma in 1982 by a score of 41–27. All three games were in Norman, Oklahoma.

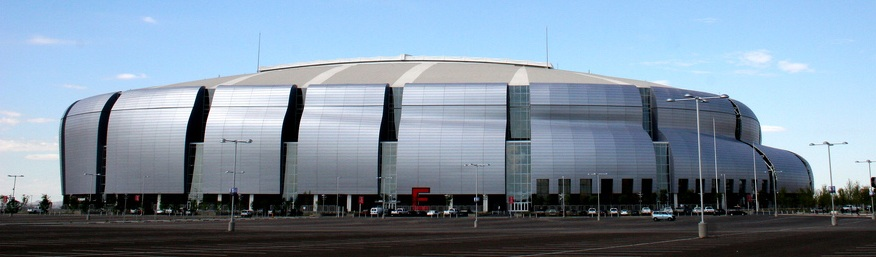
The University of Phoenix Stadium, venue of the 2008 Fiesta Bowl.

On December 16, 2007 Rich Rodriguez formally announced to his football team that he would be leaving, before the 2008 Fiesta Bowl, to succeed Lloyd Carr as the University of Michigan head coach. West Virginia associate head coach Bill Stewart was named the interim football coach for the Fiesta Bowl on 2007-12-18 and was subsequently hired as the permanent coach.

On 2007-12-17, Stewart Mandel, a writer for Sports Illustrated, revealed that Oklahoma's athletic director, Joe Castiglione had tried to arrange for Oklahoma to face the highest ranked opponent available, which would have been Virginia Tech, in the Orange Bowl. This would have pitted the #3 team against the #4 team. Big 12 Commissioner Dan Beebe contacted BCS officials (which includes the 11 conference heads and the athletic director of Notre Dame) to see if this could be done. Michael Slive, then the BCS commissioner and SEC commissioner, considered the idea but it was ultimately rejected. There was no word on which officials voted against the proposition. Beebe stated he did not agree with the decision, but respected the views of those against it. Castiglione stated that he hopes "at some point in time we can hear an explanation of why this wasn't possible given the fact the rules provided the opportunity if it was in everybody's best interest." Mandel said that two of his sources speculated that the commissioner "feared such a matchup might damage the legitimacy of the Ohio State-LSU title game." Slive said "there weren't such compelling circumstances as to merit a change."

Oklahoma missed some key players on their defense. Reggie Smith, an All-Conference cornerback, broke his big toe in the Big 12 Championship game and missed the bowl game. His backup, Lendy Holmes, was ruled academically ineligible and also missed the bowl game. Sophomore defensive tacke DeMarcus Granger was sent home after being arrested on the suspicion of shoplifting from a local mall. On the day of the game, it was reported that wide receiver Malcolm Kelly was questionable due to a deep thigh bruise. Because of the losses in the secondary, West Virginia stated they would consider passing more to take advantage of the less experienced players filling those positions.

Each team received an allotment of 17,500 tickets. West Virginia was unable to sell about 7,500 of those tickets and returned them to the Fiesta Bowl. Oklahoma had also not sold out its entire allotment. West Virginia blamed the lack of ticket sales on the distance from West Virginia to Arizona and that many Mountaineers fans purchased nonrefundable travel packages to New Orleans in expectations of playing for the national championship before the loss to Pittsburgh. West Virginia's returned tickets will go to local charities.

On the day of the game, most betting houses had the Oklahoma Sooners as a 7–8 point favorite.

== Game summary ==
West Virginia tailback Steve Slaton was taken out of the game early on with a hamstring injury, leaving the Mountaineers with freshman Noel Devine. West Virginia scored early with two field goals by Pat McAfee to take the lead, 6–0, into the second quarter. Sam Bradford was intercepted by Mountaineer safety Quinton Andrews early on, but the Sooners bounced back with a field goal to make it 6–3. However, fullback Owen Schmitt led the Mountaineers to their first touchdown on a 57-yard run to make the score 13–3 on a play in which announcer Matt Vasgersian referred to Schmitt as a "runaway beer truck." Oklahoma returned with a field goal to make it 13–6, but West Virginia ended the first half with a pass from their star quarterback, Pat White to a wide-open Darius Reynaud for a 21-yard touchdown to make it 20–6 at halftime.

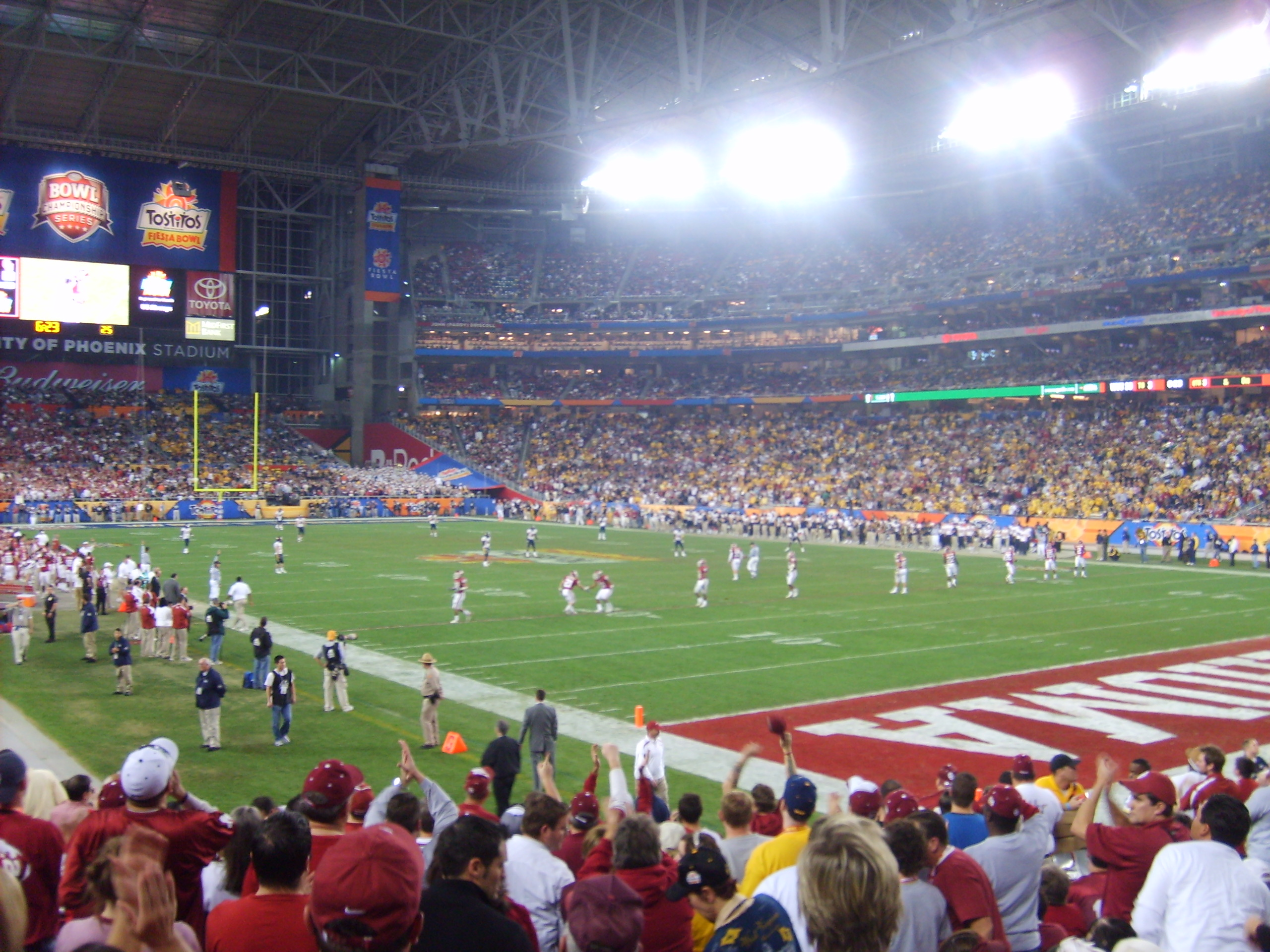
The Oklahoma Sooners line up for the ill-fated onside kick in the third quarter.

Oklahoma came back in the second half early with a field goal, followed by a goal line touchdown run by Chris Brown. The Sooners went for a 2-point conversion after the touchdown, but Bradford's pass was incomplete, leaving the score at 20–15. After an unsuccessful onside kick attempt by the Sooners, the Mountaineers answered back with a 17-yard run by Noel Devine for the touchdown to put the Mountaineers up 27–15. The Mountaineers scored again to end the third quarter, this time on a 30-yard reverse run by Darius Reynaud, to put the Mountaineers up 34–15 going into the fourth quarter. The Sooners scored early again, off of a Bradford pass to Quentin Chaney, but yet again failed a 2-point conversion attempt. West Virginia continued to roll however, as White hooked up with receiver Tito Gonzales for a 79-yard touchdown pass to put the Mountaineers up 41–21. The pass is the longest offensive play in West Virginia school bowl history. Oklahoma scored again on a Bradford pass, this time to Juaquin Iglesias, but this time kicked the extra point to make the score 41–28. The Mountaineers sealed the game with six minutes left on a 65-yard touchdown run by Noel Devine, his second score of the game.

The West Virginia Mountaineers totaled 349 rushing yards in the victory, the most ever allowed by an Oklahoma defense in a bowl game. Pat White totaled 176 yards and two touchdowns passing while rushing for 150 yards. Noel Devine rushed for 108 yards and two touchdowns on only 13 carries, while Owen Schmitt totaled 64 yards and a score on three carries. Sam Bradford recorded 242 yards, two touchdowns, and an interception passing for the Sooners. Allen Patrick rushed for 82 yards on 14 carries, while Chris Brown rushed for 50 yards and a score on 16 carries. Quentin Chaney grabbed 4 passes for 129 yards and a score while receiver Juaquin Iglesias returned seven kicks for 195 yards.

== Postgame ==
After the game, Stewart was rewarded by the WVU athletic department by being named the team's permanent head coach. He was given a new five-year contract. Stewart later signed former Mountaineer coaches, Steve Dunlap, David Lockwood, and Doc Holliday along with other assistant coaches. Steve Slaton, Johnny Dingle and Darius Reynaud, all who were key in the Mountaineers' success leading up to the bowl game, left early after the game for the 2008 NFL draft.
