= Noel Devine =

American gridiron football player (born 1988)

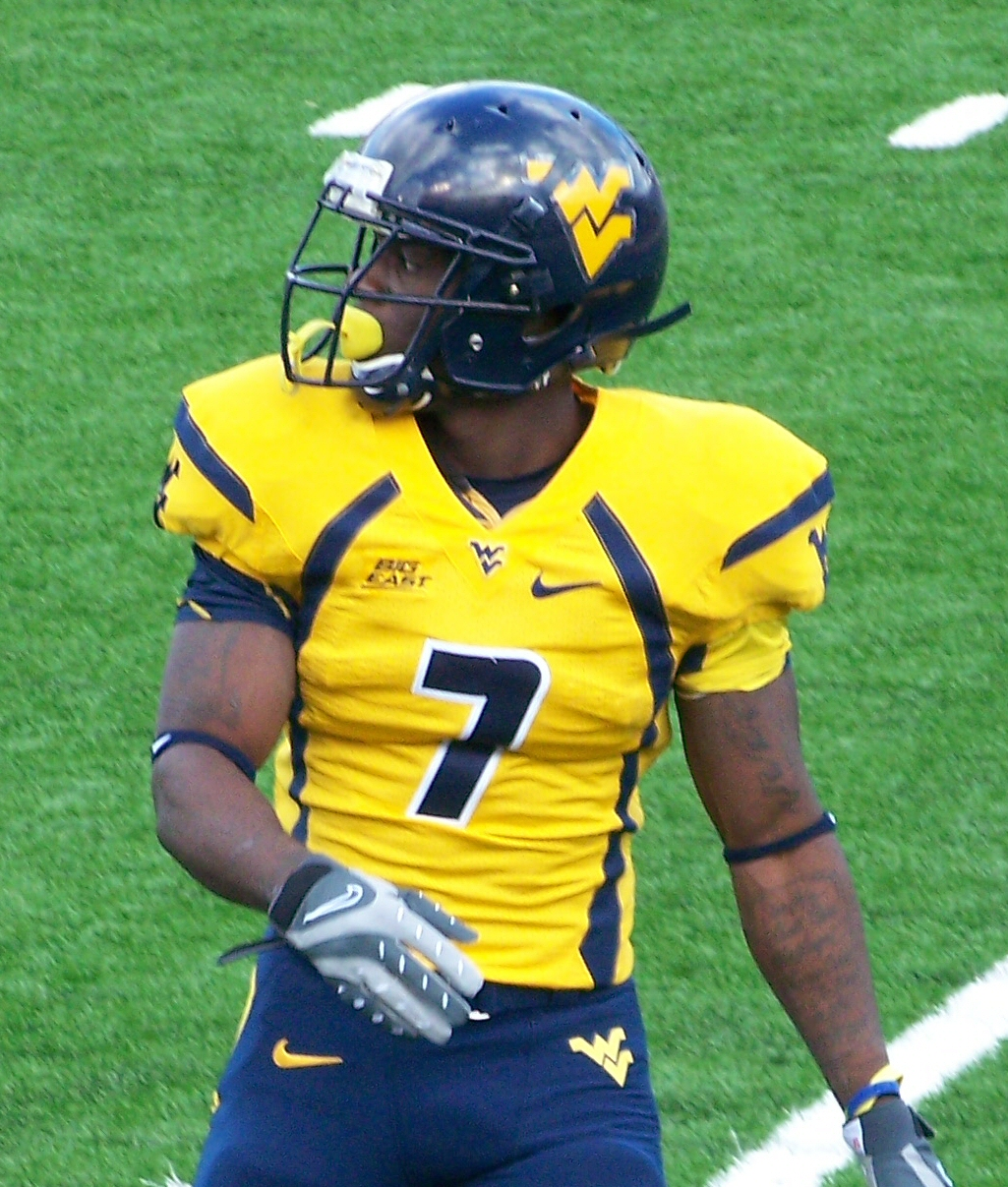
- Devine while at West Virginia in 2007

No. 7, 5
- Position: Running back

Personal information
- Born: February 16, 1988 (age 38); Fort Myers, Florida, U.S.
- Listed height: 5 ft 8 in (1.73 m)
- Listed weight: 180 lb (82 kg)

Career information
- High school: North Fort Myers (North Fort Myers, Florida)
- College: West Virginia (2007–2010)
- NFL draft: 2011: undrafted

Career history

Playing
- 2011: Philadelphia Eagles*
- 2011: Omaha Nighthawks
- 2012–2013: Montreal Alouettes
- 2014: Edmonton Eskimos
- 2019: West Virginia Roughriders
- * Offseason or practice squad member only

Coaching
- West Virginia (2025–present) Offensive analyst & asst. running backs coach

Awards and highlights
- Freshman All-American (2007); First-team All-Big East (2009); Second-team All-Big East (2008); WVU Sports Hall of Fame (2021)
- Stats at CFL.ca (archive)

Noel Devine (born February 16, 1988) is an American former football player. A running back, he played college football for the West Virginia Mountaineers and holds the record for career-all purpose yardage (5,761 yards). He is currently an offensive analyst and assistant running backs coach for the Mountaineers.

Devine was signed by the Philadelphia Eagles of the National Football League (NFL) as an undrafted free agent in 2011, but was released four days later after departing the team due to personal matters. Devine spent several years playing in the Canadian Football League (CFL) and helped guide the West Virginia Roughriders of the American Arena League (AAL) to the 2019 championship.

Devine currently owns and operates DevineSpeed, LLC, a speed training business where he trains young athletes at all levels. Devine, the highest rated recruit in Mountaineer football history, was inducted into the West Virginia University (WVU) Sports Hall of Fame on October 30, 2021.

Devine was indicted on September 18, 2026 by the Monongalia County (WV) Grand Jury for strangulation, domestic battery, unlawful restraint and stalking.

== Early life ==
Devine went to North Fort Myers High School, the same high school attended by NFL stars Deion Sanders and Jevon Kearse. Devine rushed for 627 yards and averaged 8.6 yards per carry as a freshman. In his sophomore year, Noel had 1289 yards and 23 TDs on 206 carries, for an average of 6.3. One of the most impressive games of his 10th grade year was in the 63–7 victory over Estero High. Devine rushed for 365 yards and six touchdowns on only nine carries. Devine also returned a kickoff 84 yards for a touchdown. As a junior, Devine rushed for 1,986 yards and 24 touchdowns on 173 carries, averaging 11.5 yards per carry. In his senior year, Devine totaled 2,148 yards and 31 touchdowns.

On October 20, 2006, Noel became the all-time leader in rushing yards for Lee County, surpassing former Mariner High School student and Tampa Bay running back Earnest Graham. Coincidentally, it was Graham's alma mater against which Devine was playing when the record was broken - he scored on a 65-yard touchdown run late in the 3rd quarter. He finished his high school career with 92 touchdowns, another Lee County record.

In the U.S. Army All-American Bowl game, he amazingly took David Green's kickoff back 88 yards before catching his big right toe on the turf and falling just short of the end zone.

Devine was the #3 ranked running back (and #6 prospect overall) in the nation by ESPN's 2007 Recruit Tracker. Before signing with West Virginia, he was recruited by coaches from some of the nation's other top collegiate programs, such as the University of Nebraska–Lincoln, University of Alabama and Florida State University.

== College career ==
=== Freshman season ===
Devine got his first chance to play in the 4th quarter of West Virginia's season opener against Western Michigan. Devine showed his speed as he beat the defense to the corner as he went 23 yards after spinning off a defender. Devine scored his first collegiate touchdown on an 8-yard run to score WVU's final score, as the #3 ranked Mountaineers beat Western Michigan 62–24. Devine finished the game with 7 carries for 44 yards and a reception for 19 yards.

In the second game of the season, Devine helped the WVU seal a 4th quarter victory over in-state rival Marshall. Devine only had 5 carries, but managed to rack up 76 yards and 2 touchdowns to help the third-ranked Mountaineers beat the Thundering Herd 48–23. Devine also had two kickoff returns for 40 yards. His longest run of the day was 39 yards.

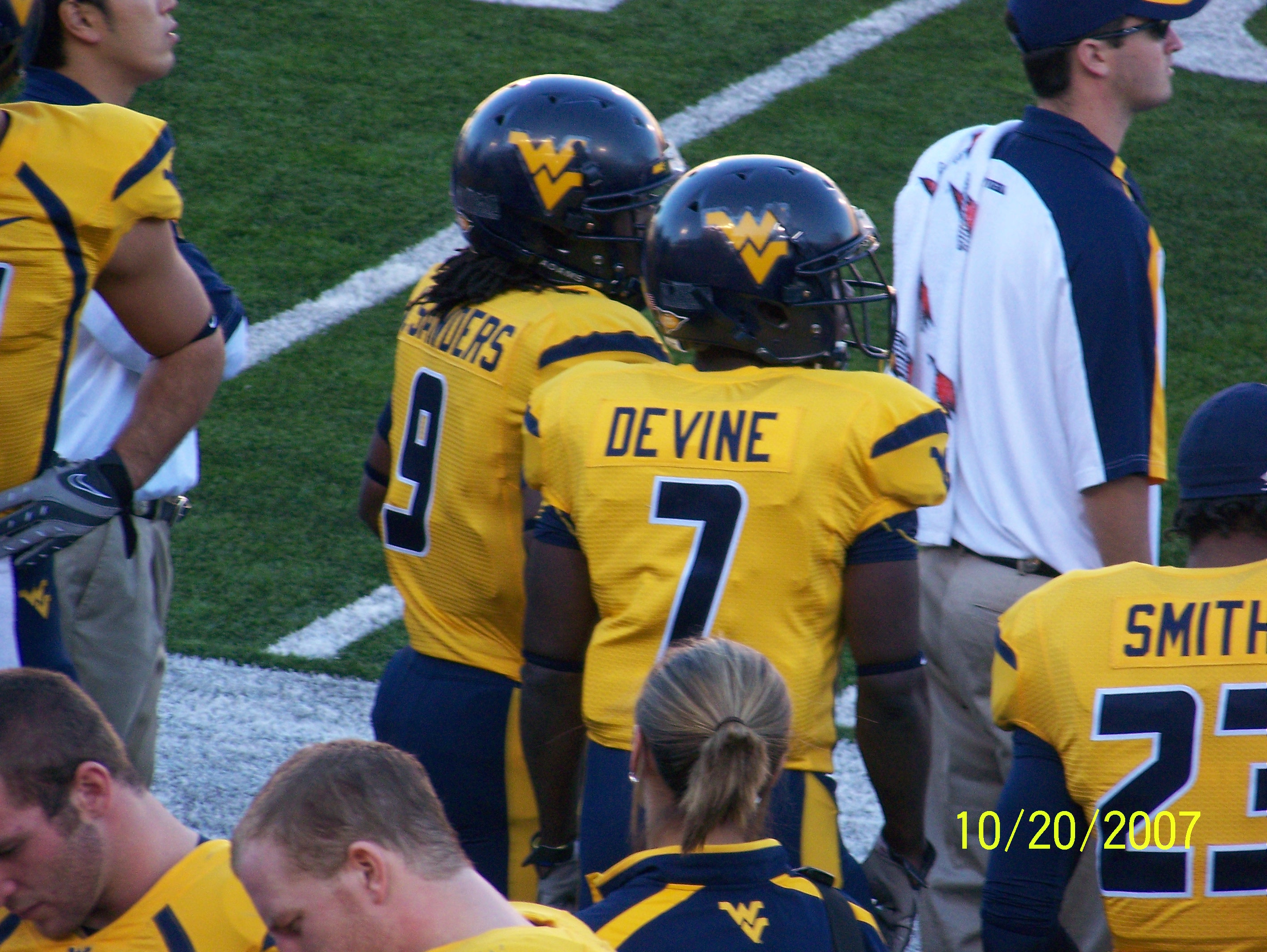
Noel Devine (right) and Jock Sanders (9) stand on the sideline during the Mississippi State game

In the third game of the season, against Maryland, Devine had the best game of the season to that point. In the 31–14 win, Devine rushed for 136 yards on just 5 carries; a 27.2 yards average. His biggest run of the day was a 76 yards dash down the sideline to the one-yard line. On his next carry he juked out a number of defenders and spun off a facemask grab to cap off the 18-yard gain. He also had one reception for two yards and two kick returns for 47 yards. Devine took only two carries to reach 100 yards against Maryland.

In the next game against ECU, Devine had 7 rushes for 11 yards, a reception for 7 yards and a kick return for 25 yards. In the Mountaineers' first loss of the season against USF, 21–13, Devine had 4 carries for 36 yards. He also had 36 yards on two kick returns. In the 55–14 win over Syracuse, Devine was held to 13 yards on 4 carries, with 33 yards on two kick returns. Devine sat out the Mississippi State game. Against twenty-fifth-ranked Rutgers, Devine had 6 carries for 40 yards.

Against Louisville, Devine had 2 rushes for 11 yards and one reception for 4 yards. He also had 4 kick returns for 97 yards, including a 41-yarder. After the 38–31 Louisville win, rumors circulated that Devine was mad about lack of playing time and had supposedly "torn up his locker" in a fit of anger. In an article with Rivals.com, Devine dismissed the rumors saying, "If I really wanted to play I would have gone to a sorry team...I didn't expect a lot of playing time." Devine also said, "I think I have played fairly. There's people that are not playing and they're on the team and they're happy. You got a great running back ahead of you. Really, I'm not expecting a lot."

In the 28–23 road win against twenty-second-ranked Cincinnati, Devine had only 23 yards on 2 carries, including a 17-yard rush. However, had four kick returns for 86 yards, averaging 21.5 yards per return. In the Big East Championship-clinching 66–21 win over twentieth-ranked Connecticut, Devine rushed for 118 yards and a score on 11 carries, which ranked second-best on the team, trailing only quarterback Pat White.

Subsequently, the then second-ranked Mountaineers were upset 13–9 by Pittsburgh in the 100th edition of the Backyard Brawl. Devine had only 11 yards on 7 carries; a 1.6 average. However, in the 4th quarter, Devine returned a kickoff 48 yards in the final minutes of the game. But, ultimately, the Mountaineers were stopped on fourth down to end the game.

Devine would finish his freshman season in West Virginia's Fiesta Bowl win over Oklahoma. After losing Steve Slaton to a leg injury in the first quarter, Devine filled in for WVU with 105 yards on 12 carries and 2 touchdowns, including a 65-yard run which provided the final score of the game. The run broke a West Virginia bowl record for longest rush and was the second longest play from scrimmage for the Mountaineers in the season. He also returned 4 kickoffs for 88 yards, a 22.0 yards average, and pulled in two receptions for 47 yards.

Devine was given honorable mention for the Freshman All-American team by various sources, including SportingNews, and was awarded the team's Danny Van Etten Rookie of the Year Award by head coach Rich Rodriguez. After Rodriguez left the team before the 2008 Fiesta Bowl that offseason Devine thought about transferring. He finished his freshman season with 73 carries for 627 yards and 6 touchdowns. He also added 7 receptions for 90 yards and 26 returns for 599 yards. Devine ended the season with 1,316 all-purpose yards, the 21st most in a single-season in school history. Devine also finished the year ranked tenth in the Big East in rushing yards per game and #5 in the conference in kickoff return yards.

=== Sophomore season ===
After former head coach Rich Rodriguez left West Virginia and announced his decision to accept the head coaching job at the University of Michigan, Noel Devine considered transferring, but decided he would finish his career at West Virginia. On January 14, 2008, West Virginia starting running back Steve Slaton announced his desire to enter the NFL draft instead of returning for his senior season. Slaton's departure meant Devine would be the probable starter for the 2008 season.

Devine and quarterback Pat White were named the #1 "scary star" of the 2008 by Rivals.com. Shortly afterwards, the Mountaineers began their first spring practice. West Virginia running backs coach, Chris Beatty, said of Devine, “He’s as quick as he looked on television...So quick and yet he has great patience and things like that. My goal is to just let him run fast and do the things he does so well.” Devine also commented that he could handle at least 30 carries a game as the feature back, despite his size; which he said he wanted to jump up to 180 pounds. Head coach Bill Stewart also said that Devine maxed out at 405 pounds at the bench press during the spring.

To begin the 2008 season, Noel Devine rushed for 47 yards on 9 carries and also had 37 yards on 6 receptions in the season opening victory against the Villanova Wildcats, 48–21. In the following 24–3 loss to the ECU Pirates, Devine rushed 12 times for 94 yards (7.8 yard per carry average) and returned two kickoffs for 47 yards. In West Virginia's following 14–17 overtime loss to Colorado, Devine rushed 26 times for 133 yards and also had 11 yards on three receptions (second on the team in rushing behind quarterback Pat White).

In the 27–3 victory over Marshall, Devine rushed 14 times for 125 yards (8.9 yards per run) and his first touchdown of the season. To begin Big East play, Devine rushed 19 times for 55 yards, a 2.9 yard per carry average, in the 24–17 victory over Rutgers. In the following 17–6 victory over Syracuse, Devine rushed for 188 yards on 18 carries for a touchdown. His 188 yards was a career-high, and his 92-yard rushing touchdown in the 4th quarter not only was a career-long, but also was the second-longest rush in school and stadium history. Devine's performance in the Syracuse win won him the Big East Offensive Player of the Week honors. Following the 188-yard performance against Syracuse, Devine totaled a career-high 207 yards and a touchdown on 17 carries in the Mountaineers' 34–17 victory over Auburn. For the game, Devine recorded six runs of at least 20 yards. The two-game stretch totaled 395 yards and two touchdowns.

West Virginia then defeated #25 UCONN 35–13, the team's first road win of the season, in which Devine rushed 17 times for 60 yards - a 3.5 yard per rush average. However, West Virginia was then defeated by Cincinnati in a 26–23 overtime loss, as the Mountaineers rallied from being down 20–7 with under two minutes left in the game to tie it and send it to overtime. Devine, however, finished the game with 19 rushes for 58 yards and 6 receptions for 48 yards - a total of 106 yards of offense.

Devine and West Virginia bounced back in the following 35–21 victory over Louisville in their annual series. Devine posted his fifth 100-yard rushing game on the season with 154 yards on 13 carries. The performance included a 79-yard run, which was a school record for the longest non-touchdown run in school history. However, the Mountaineers then lost in the Backyard Brawl to Pittsburgh 19–15. Devine carried the ball 12 times for 17 yards - a 1.4 yard per carry average - and caught 3 passes for 6 yards in the loss.

Devine finished out the regular season with 17 carries for 90 yards and 3 receptions for 21 yards - 111 total yards of offense - in the 13–7 win over South Florida, however Devine did not start as head coach Bill Stewart said he was disappointed in his performance the prior week. However, Devine was named a second-team All-Big East selection following the victory.

In the Meineke Car Care Bowl victory over North Carolina, Devine rushed 13 times for 61 yards and a touchdown. He finished his sophomore season with 1,289 yards and 4 touchdowns.

=== Junior season ===
Devine played in 13 games and started 10, leading the team in rushing with 1,465 yards, averaging 6.1 yards a carry with 13 touchdowns rushing. He finished the season as the #2 rusher in the conference and #17 nationally. He was named a unanimous all-Big East first-team selection by league coaches, Phil Steele and ESPN.com, and was named one of 16 semifinalists for the Maxwell Award, signifying the top offensive player in the nation.

On January 14, 2010, Devine announced his intention to forgo the NFL draft and returned for his senior season with the Mountaineers.

=== Senior season ===
Prior to the season, Devine was named a preseason All-American by numerous publications, and was considered a leading contender for the Heisman Trophy. He appeared headed for another 1,000-yard season after producing 100-yard rushing efforts in wins against Coastal Carolina, Marshall and Maryland, but a turf toe injury sustained against LSU and later an ankle injury against Louisville severely limited his production.

Devine reached the 100-yard mark just one more time against Syracuse, and finished the season with just four carries for 24 yards against Pitt, 13 carries for 31 yards against Rutgers and eight carries for 50 yards against NC State in the Champs Sports Bowl. With 122 yards rushing against the Syracuse Orange on October 23, Devine became the fourth player in Big East history to rush for 4,000 career yards, joining fellow Mountaineers Avon Cobourne and Pat White, and Rutgers' Ray Rice.

Devine finished the season with 1254 all-purpose yards; however, the injuries he suffered nagged him throughout the season, and his yards per carry average dipped considerably as a result. These injuries, combined with his lack of size and a perceived unwillingness to block, labeled him "undraftable" by many NFL teams. He was unable to participate in the NFL Combine due to his ankle injury and this further hurt his chances at being drafted.

=== Career statistics ===
WVU		Rushing					Receiving					Kickoff returns				
Season	Games	Att	Yds	Avg	TD	Lg	Rec	Yds	Avg	TD	Lg	No	Yds	Avg	TD	Lg
2007	12	73	627	8.6	6	76	7	90	12.9	0	34	22	511	23.2	0	48
2008	13	206	1,289	6.3	4	92	35	185	5.3	0	17	3	63	21.0	0	24
2009	13	241	1,465	6.1	13	88	22	177	8.0	1	20	5	100	20.0	0	26
2010	13	208	934	4.5	6	50	34	258	7.6	1	48	4	62	15.5	0	25
Total	51	728	4,315	5.9	29	92	98	710	7.2	2	48	34	736	21.6	0	48

== Professional career ==
Pre-draft measurables
Height	Weight	Arm length	Hand span	40-yard dash	10-yard split	20-yard split	20-yard shuttle	Three-cone drill	Vertical jump	Broad jump	Bench press
5 ft 7 1/2 in (1.71 m)	179 lb (81 kg)	29 1/4 in (0.74 m)	8 5/8 in (0.22 m)	4.43 s	1.51 s	2.54 s	4.25 s	6.88 s	35.5 in (0.90 m)	10 ft 1 in (3.07 m)	24 reps
All values from NFL Combine/Pro Day

Despite Devine's high-profile coming out of high school and subsequent successful college career, he was projected as a late-round pick in the 2011 NFL draft. He ultimately went undrafted.

Devine was signed by the Philadelphia Eagles as a free agent on July 26, 2011. The Eagles waived him on July 30 after he left the squad.

The Omaha Nighthawks of the United Football League signed Devine on August 18, 2011.

Devine signed with the Montreal Alouettes of the Canadian Football League (CFL) on February 10, 2012. In six games with the Alouettes, Devine fumbled six times, including a three-fumble game on August 8 during a 38–13 loss to the Toronto Argonauts. After fumbling a punt-return in the fourth quarter, he left that game with an ankle injury. In a telephone interview with the Montreal Gazette on August 9, interim head coach and general manager Jim Popp suggested Devine may be released by the team, when and if he is cleared to play by the medical staff.

Devine signed with the Edmonton Eskimos of the CFL on July 8, 2014.

Devine participated in The Spring League in 2017.

== Coaching career ==
In January 2025, Devine joined WVU as an offensive analyst and assistant running backs coach.

== Personal life ==
Devine was only three months old when his father died in 1988 of complications from AIDS, and 11 years old when his mother also died of AIDS. Custody passed to his maternal grandmother, but the two were not compatible. Eventually, Noel moved in with Liz and Robert Harlow Sr, parents of one of Noel's friends. By his junior year in high school, Devine had fathered two children by two different women. He was also witness to a shooting in late 2004, in which one of his friends, 15-year-old Rashard Patterson, was killed by a shotgun blast to the chest.

Devine has a relationship with Deion Sanders, who himself is a graduate of North Fort Myers High School. At one point, Sanders planned to become Devine's legal guardian. Devine moved to Prosper, Texas, where he lived with Sanders, but after a few weeks, he took Sanders' wife's vehicle to the Dallas/Fort Worth International Airport, where a plane ticket back to Florida awaited him. Devine and Sanders remained in contact, perhaps more so as the 2007 signing day approached, when Sanders assisted Devine in preparing to sign a letter of intent to play football in the college ranks. Sanders revealed the nature of his mentor role in Devine's decisions in his column for The News-Press, a Fort Myers news outlet. He had recommended that a prep school would better prepare Devine for college.

Devine was interviewed by ESPN The Magazine under their NEXT editions, which picks the next big athlete of the year. Devine was a nominee for the 2008 edition, along with Brandon Roy, Joba Chamberlain, Tyson Gay, Patrick Willis, and Novak Djokovic. In the interview, Devine stated that his idol is Barry Sanders, and that his best game of his career at that point was against Maryland.
