= Matt Ryan (American football) =

American football player and executive (born 1985)

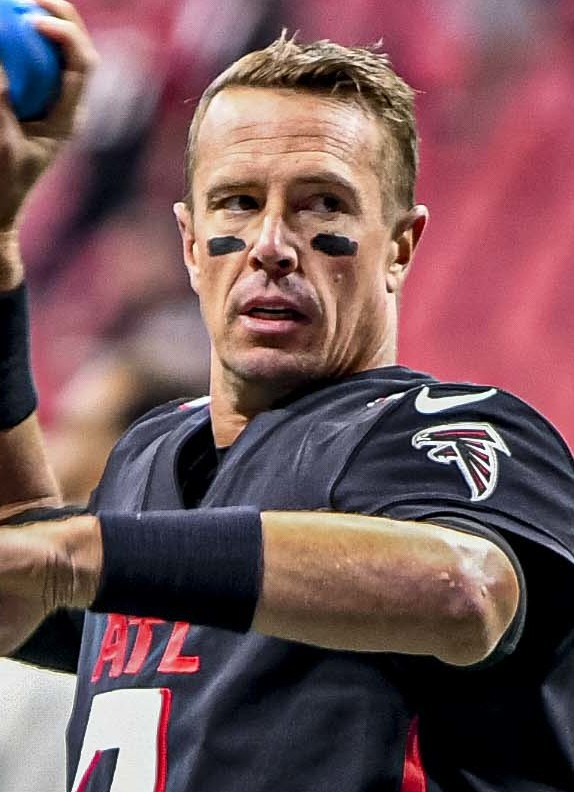
- Ryan with the Atlanta Falcons in 2021

Atlanta Falcons
- Title: President of Football

Personal information
- Born: May 17, 1985 (age 41); Exton, Pennsylvania, U.S.
- Listed height: 6 ft 5 in (1.96 m)
- Listed weight: 220 lb (100 kg)

Career information
- Position: Quarterback (No. 2)
- High school: Penn Charter (Philadelphia, Pennsylvania)
- College: Boston College (2003–2007)
- NFL draft: 2008: 1st round, 3rd overall pick

Career history

Playing
- Atlanta Falcons (2008–2021); Indianapolis Colts (2022)

Operations
- Atlanta Falcons (2026–present) President of Football

Awards and highlights
- NFL Most Valuable Player (2016); NFL Offensive Player of the Year (2016); NFL Offensive Rookie of the Year (2008); First-team All-Pro (2016); 4× Pro Bowl (2010, 2012, 2014, 2016); NFL passer rating leader (2016); NFL completion percentage leader (2012); Atlanta Falcons Ring of Honor; Manning Award (2007); Johnny Unitas Golden Arm Award (2007); ACC Player of the Year (2007); ACC Offensive Player of the Year (2007); First-team All-American (2007); 2× First-team All-ACC (2006, 2007); Boston College Eagles Jersey No. 12 retired

Career NFL statistics
- Passing attempts: 8,464
- Passing completions: 5,551
- Completion percentage: 65.6%
- TD–INT: 381–183
- Passing yards: 62,792
- Passer rating: 93.6
- Stats at Pro Football Reference

Matthew Thomas Ryan (born May 17, 1985) is an American professional football executive and former quarterback who is the president of football for the Atlanta Falcons of the National Football League (NFL). Nicknamed "Matty Ice," he previously played in the NFL for 15 seasons, primarily with the Falcons. He ranks among the league's all-time top 10 in passing yards, passing touchdowns, attempts, and completions, and is the Falcons' franchise leader in each of these categories.

Ryan played college football for the Boston College Eagles, winning the Manning and Johnny Unitas Golden Arm Awards and receiving first-team All-American honors in 2007. He was selected third overall by the Falcons in the 2008 NFL draft and took them to the playoffs in his first season, earning him Offensive Rookie of the Year. Ryan went on to lead the team to six playoff appearances and three division titles during his 14 seasons in Atlanta, while receiving four Pro Bowl selections and one first-team All-Pro selection. His most successful season was in 2016 when he was named NFL Most Valuable Player (MVP) and led the Falcons to an appearance in Super Bowl LI. Ryan played for the Indianapolis Colts in his final year. After retiring, he rejoined the Falcons in 2026 as the president of football. He was inducted to the Atlanta Falcons Ring of Honor in 2024.

== Early life ==
Ryan went to William Penn Charter School in Philadelphia where he was a three-year starter and earned All-East honors from Larunt Lemming Prep Football Report. He captured All-Southeastern Pennsylvania accolades as a senior quarterback in addition to receiving All-City first-team honors in 2002 and second-team recognition in 2001. A three-time All-League selection, he threw for more than 2000 yards with 19 touchdowns as a senior, finishing his career by completing more than 52 percent of his pass attempts during all three seasons at the helm. Ryan played football, basketball, and baseball while in high school and was named captain of all three teams his senior year. He was quarterback of the football team in 2002, played small forward on the basketball team, and was a pitcher and shortstop on the baseball team.

Ryan says he was "mildly" recruited and began receiving scholarship offers as a sophomore. Some of the schools that offered him an athletic scholarship were Purdue, Georgia Tech, Temple, and Connecticut. After visiting Boston College during his junior year, he gave them his verbal commitment on August 14, 2002. His choices had come down to Iowa or Boston College. Ryan was looking for a university close to home and one that had a strong and competitive football program with a major emphasis on academics.

== College career ==
=== 2003–2004 ===
Ryan began attending Boston College in 2003 and redshirted his first year with the team. Before the 2004 season, he was named the starting quarterback for Boston College due to an injury to Quinton Porter. He made his collegiate debut on October 2, 2004, against the UMass Minutemen and completed two of three passes for 16 yards in the 29–7 victory. He would not complete his first touchdown until November 20, 2004 against Temple after throwing a 32-yard touchdown pass to Larry Lester. Replacing the injured Paul Peterson, he completed 9-of-15 passes for 121 yards in the 34–17 victory. He made his first collegiate start on November 27, 2004, in the final game of that season, completing 24 of 51 passes for 200 yards, one touchdown, and three interceptions in a 43–17 loss against Syracuse. He also played against North Carolina in the Continental Tire Bowl. He completed one of his two passes for 13 yards in the 37–24 victory. Ryan also received the 2004 Freshman Male Scholar-Athlete award in the same year.

=== 2005 ===
At the beginning of the 2005 season, Ryan was named the second-string quarterback behind Quinton Porter. Porter had some success at the beginning of the year, including winning Atlantic Coast Conference Player of the Week for his performance in Boston College's 28–17 win over Virginia. After a 30–10 loss to third-ranked Virginia Tech, coach Tom O'Brien finally went to Ryan for good in the fourth quarter of the next game against North Carolina State. In ten games, of which he started five, he completed 121 of 195 passes for 1,514 yards. He had eight touchdowns and five interceptions. He also rushed for five touchdowns and 94 yards. He started his first bowl game in the MPC Computers Bowl versus Boise State. He completed 19 of 36 passes for 256 yards and a career-best three touchdowns in the 27–21 victory to help Boston College finish with a #18 ranking in the final AP Poll.

=== 2006 ===
Ryan started 11 of the 12 games. He completed 263-of-427 passes for a conference-leading 2,942 yards, 15 touchdowns, and ten interceptions. In addition, he rushed for four touchdowns. He was All-ACC first-team and led the ACC in total offense (242.2 yards per game) and in passing yards (245.5 yards per game). He was named ACC Offensive Back of the week three times. He set career highs in completions (32 against Central Michigan) and passing yards (356 against Brigham Young). He led the team to a 9–3 record including double overtime wins versus Clemson and Brigham Young. He led the Eagles to a close 25–24 victory on December 26, 2006, in the Meineke Car Care Bowl against Navy in Charlotte, North Carolina. In the season opener against Central Michigan, Ryan sprained his ankle. Against Virginia Tech, Ryan broke his foot on the same leg. Despite these injuries, Ryan only missed one game (against Buffalo). His 57 pass attempts in the 2006 Wake Forest game tied Shawn Halloran's performance against Syracuse in 1985 and Frank Harris' performance against Army in 1968. For the school record, his 40 pass completions in the 2006 Wake Forest game broke the old school record of 37 by Harris in the game against Army in 1968.

=== 2007 ===
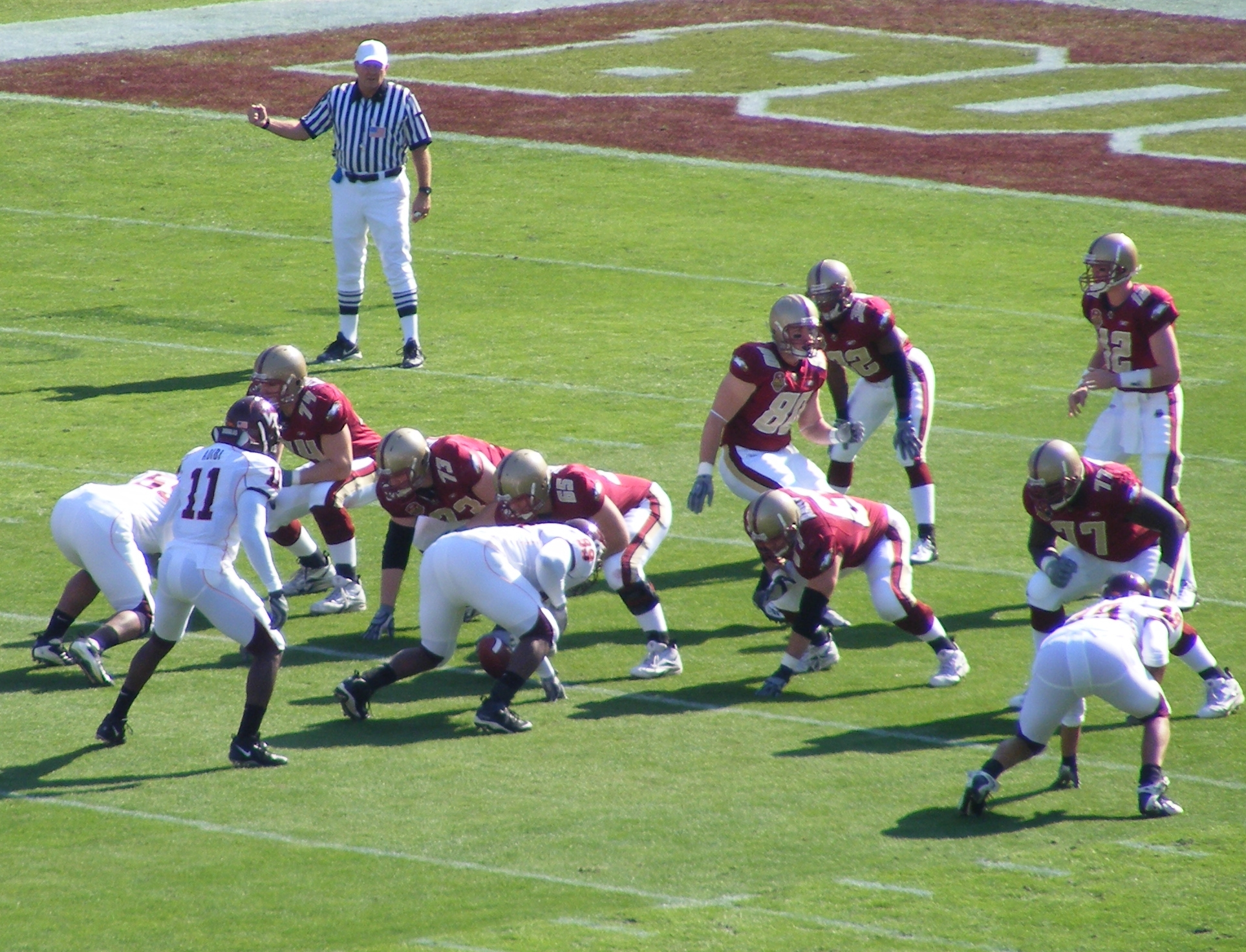
Ryan and the Boston College Eagles line up on offense in the 2007 ACC Championship game.

External image
- Ryan on the cover of NCAA Football 09

Ryan launched a website during his senior year called Mattyice.com, where fans and media had 24-hour access to his video highlights, updated biographical information, statistics and other information.

Before the season started, Ryan was named to the preseason All-ACC team. Boston College also hired a new coach: Jeff Jagodzinski, a longtime NFL assistant. Against Wake Forest, he completed 32 of 52 passes for 408 yards and five touchdowns in the 38–28 victory. He continued his hot streak versus Georgia Tech, going 30–of–44 with one touchdown and passing for a career-high 435 yards against the staunch Tech defense en route to a convincing 24–10 road victory. After this game, Ryan was suggested as a potential Heisman Trophy contender. Battling Virginia Tech through bad weather in Blacksburg, Virginia, Ryan led an amazing comeback for the Boston College Eagles, passing for two touchdowns with less than three minutes to play on October 25, 2007, including the game-winner with 11 seconds left to Andre Callender. However, Ryan's chances to win the Heisman fell sharply after he threw three interceptions in a 27–17 loss to an unranked 6–3 Florida State. However, with a strong performance against Clemson, his chances were raised substantially. Despite two consecutive ACC losses, Ryan and the Eagles found themselves with a trip to the conference championship on the line. Down 10–3 in the third quarter, he led the offense on a game-tying drive, hitting on key passes to Rich Gunnell, Andre Callender, and Ryan Purvis, landing the Eagles at the Clemson two-yard line early in the fourth. James McCluskey finished the job from there, running it in to even the score at 10-apiece. Shortly thereafter, a Clemson turnover resulted in a Boston College field goal and a 13–10 lead for the Eagles. On November 24, against ACC rival Miami, Ryan surpassed Doug Flutie for the most passing touchdowns in a single season by an Eagle quarterback with 28 touchdowns, ultimately ending the season with 31. Despite these records, he struggled with throwing interceptions throughout the year, and finished with 19 (second most among college quarterbacks). His five touchdown passes in the 2007 Wake Forest game are one shy of the school record of six, held by Flutie in 1984 against North Carolina. For Boston College, it was their first 10-win regular season since 1940 and the first time they had achieved back-to-back 10-overall-win seasons in program history. He led the Eagles to extend the nation's longest bowl winning streak to eight with a 24–21 victory over Michigan State Spartans in the Champs Sports Bowl on December 28, Ryan threw three touchdown passes, two to Rich Gunnell and one to Jon Loyte. He finished the season with a conference-leading 4,507 passing yards, 31 touchdowns, and 19 interceptions.

Ryan earned various accolades for the 2007 season. He was named the ACC Offensive Player of the Year and the ACC Player of the Year. He was awarded the 2007 Johnny Unitas Golden Arm Award, given annually in the United States to the nation's most outstanding college football senior quarterback. The other finalists for the 2007 award were Hawaii's Colt Brennan, Louisville's Brian Brohm, Oregon's Dennis Dixon, and Kentucky's Andre' Woodson (all of whom were drafted at the 2008 NFL draft). He was selected to play in the 2008 Senior Bowl. He also won the 2007 Manning Award awarded to the nation's top quarterback, beating out eventual Heisman winner Tim Tebow and eight other finalists for that year's award: Erik Ainge (Tennessee), Sam Bradford (Oklahoma), Colt Brennan (Hawaiʻi), Chase Daniel (Missouri), Dennis Dixon (Oregon), Graham Harrell (Texas Tech), Pat White (West Virginia), and Andre Woodson (Kentucky). He was named "Eagle of the Year" alongside Boston College's first ever individual champion Kasey Hill. He finished in seventh place in the Heisman Trophy voting that year.

He was featured as the cover athlete for the PS3 version of NCAA Football 09. In 2016, Boston College retired his jersey.

== Professional career ==
=== Atlanta Falcons ===
Pre-draft measurables
Height	Weight	Arm length	Hand span	40-yard dash	10-yard split	20-yard split	20-yard shuttle	Three-cone drill	Wonderlic
6 ft 4 3/4 in (1.95 m)	228 lb (103 kg)	32 5/8 in (0.83 m)	9 1/2 in (0.24 m)	4.89 s	1.67 s	2.86 s	4.51 s	7.40 s	32
All values from NFL Combine

External images
- Matt Ryan at the 2008 Boston College Pro Day
- Ryan introduced as the 3rd overall pick of the 2008 NFL Draft

Ryan scored a 32 on the Wonderlic exam, tying Louisville's Brian Brohm for the highest score by a quarterback in the 2008 Draft class.

He was selected third overall by the Atlanta Falcons in the 2008 NFL draft. He was the second first-round pick of the draft to sign when he agreed to a six-year, $72 million contract on May 20, 2008; the contract contained $34.75 million in guaranteed money. The contract made Ryan the fourth highest paid quarterback in the NFL behind Peyton Manning, Ben Roethlisberger, and Carson Palmer, despite never having played a professional game. This helped fuel the discussion regarding whether salaries for first-round draftees in the NFL were too high. In addition, Ryan had signed endorsement deals with Nike and AirTran.

==== 2008 ====
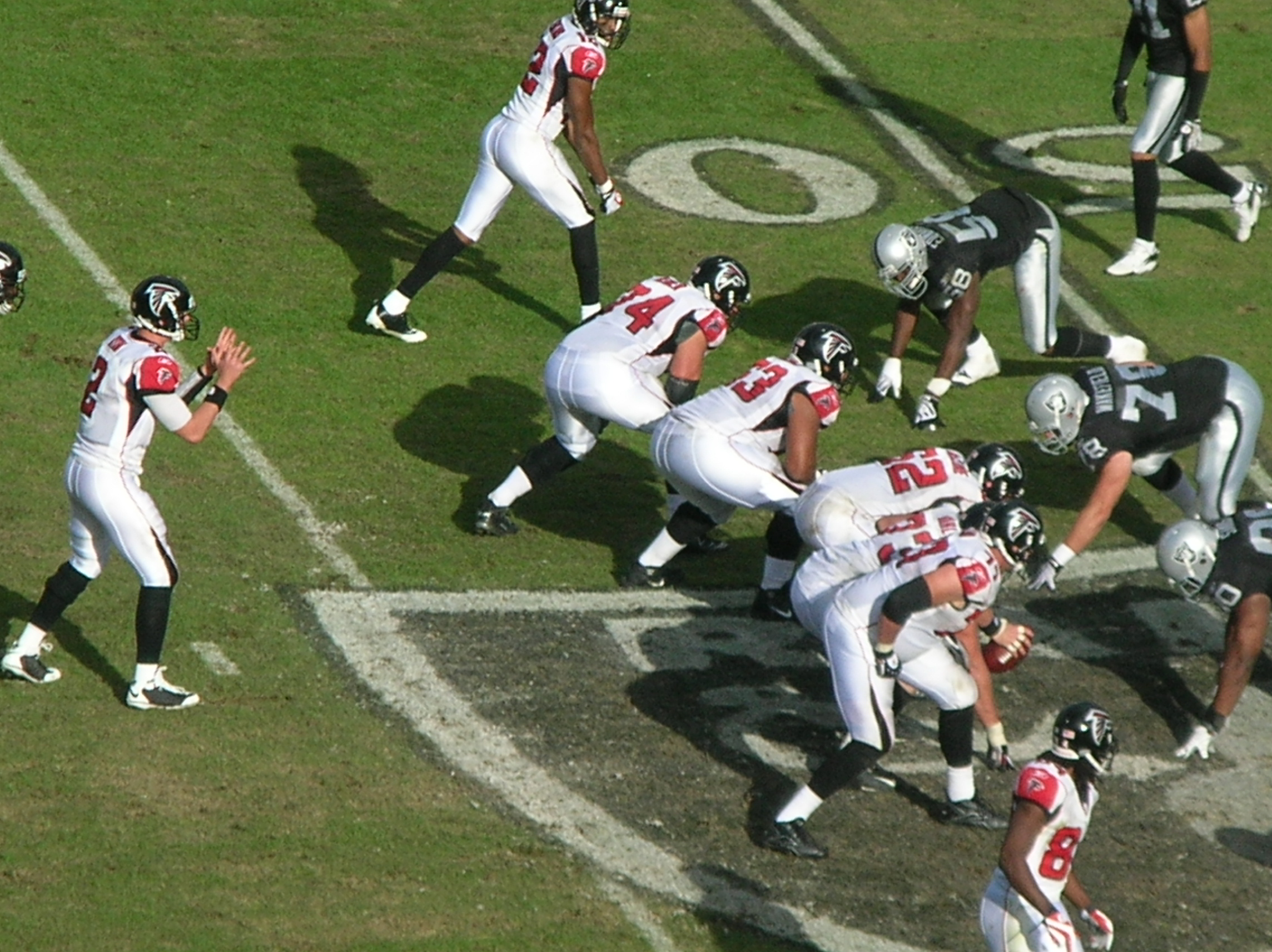
Ryan takes a snap against the Raiders on November 2.

On August 24, 2008, Ryan was named the starting quarterback for the September 7 regular season opener against the Detroit Lions. Ryan became the first rookie quarterback to start a season for the Falcons since Michael Vick in 2001. In the game, Ryan completed his first NFL pass for a 62-yard touchdown to Michael Jenkins, becoming the first quarterback to throw a touchdown on his first career NFL pass since Michael Bishop of the New England Patriots in 2000. Ryan was sacked for the first time by Lions defensive player Dewayne White in his first win. The second game of the season against the Tampa Bay Buccaneers marked Ryan's first interception by rookie cornerback Aqib Talib and also by Sabby Piscitelli.

In Week 3 against the Kansas City Chiefs, he completed the then-longest touchdown pass in his career for 70 yards to Roddy White. The 70-yard touchdown pass to White was the longest pass completion for the Falcons since December 23, 2007, when Chris Redman threw a 74-yard touchdown pass. In the same game, Ryan completed passes to 6 different players. The following week, he threw for 194 yards and two touchdowns against the Green Bay Packers. His touchdown passes went to Roddy White and tight end Justin Peelle. The following week against the Chicago Bears, Ryan led the Falcons to a comeback win. With six seconds left he completed a 26-yard strike to Michael Jenkins that set Jason Elam up for the game-winning field goal as time expired. Ryan finished the game 22-of-30 for a then career-high 301 passing yards. He also had a key fourth-quarter touchdown pass to Roddy White. On Atlanta's first offensive drive, Ryan completed all five of his pass attempts for 57 yards en route to a Falcons field goal and a 3–0 lead. Ryan was named Diet Pepsi Rookie of the Week for his performance.

Ryan created an activity named "Folleyball" for NFL Play 60 at NFL Rush.com, published in October of that year.

External videos
- Matt Ryan's 1st NFL pass, and touchdown

On October 30, Ryan was honored as the NFC Rookie of the Month for October following an impressive string of games in which he led the Falcons to a 2–1 record. Ryan became the first player in Falcons franchise history to be awarded this honor In Week 8 against the Oakland Raiders, Ryan finished with the highest completion percentage of his career (77.3). He threw for 220 yards, two touchdowns, and posted a quarterback rating of 138.4. He also completed passes to eight different receivers and the game was his third multiple touchdown game (Green Bay, Philadelphia). His first half passing yardage, completion percentage (81.3), and passer rating (154.2) are all career highs for a half and his two touchdowns tie a first half high, Ryan's final completion percentage of 77.3 is a career-high along with his passer rating of 138.4. He was named NFC Offensive Player of the Week following his performance against the Raiders. He scored his first rushing career touchdown against the New Orleans Saints on December 7 with a 12-yard touchdown scramble, Ryan also achieved 3,000+ passing yards in the 2008 season being only the 2nd rookie to do so. Peyton Manning was the first.

Ryan became the first Falcons rookie quarterback in franchise history to throw for over 3,000 yards in a season after finishing with 206 yards against Tampa Bay. Ryan's passing total also makes him only the 10th quarterback in club annals to hit the 3,000-yard mark and the first since 1998 when Chris Chandler threw 3,154. It was also his first overtime win as a starter. He was named Diet Pepsi NFL Rookie of the Week for games played after his performance by the second time in his career. Ryan finished second amongst rookies in fan Pro Bowl voting (416,468 votes), behind only Titans running back Chris Johnson. Ryan threw for a season-low 134 yards in Week 16 against the Minnesota Vikings, ending a streak of nine straight games with at least 200 yards passing, he finished 13-of-24 passing, throwing an 8-yard touchdown passes to Jerious Norwood in the second quarter; however, with this win Ryan led the Falcons to their first playoff berth since 2004.

He finished the season with 3,440 passing yards, 17 touchdowns (one rushing), and 11 interceptions. He and fellow rookie Joe Flacco were the first rookie quarterbacks to lead their teams to the playoffs after starting all 16 games of the season. He is one of twelve rookie quarterbacks to throw for over 3,000 yards (2,743 m) in their rookie season. On December 31, Ryan was named the AP NFL Rookie of the Year. In addition, he was named to the All-Rookie Team for the 2008 season, joining Steve Bartkowski (1975) and Doug Johnson (2000) as the only Falcons quarterbacks to ever claim this award.

Ryan made his first playoff start in the Wild Card Round against the Arizona Cardinals on January 3, 2009. He was 15 years younger than opposing quarterback Kurt Warner, the third-largest age discrepancy between playoff quarterbacks. His first attempted playoff pass was an interception. Ryan completed 26 of 40 passing attempts for 199 yards and two touchdowns but was intercepted twice. He threw his first touchdown in a playoff contest to Justin Peelle. Atlanta lost, 30–24. Falcons Head Coach Mike Smith and Ryan became the first rookie head coach and rookie quarterback to coach and compete in a playoff game since the Cleveland Rams accomplished the feat with coach Adam Walsh and quarterback Bob Waterfield in 1945 (the feat was repeated the next day when Ravens Joe Flacco and John Harbaugh did so.) During the game, Ryan set an NFL playoff rookie record with 26 completions in a single postseason game.

==== 2009 ====
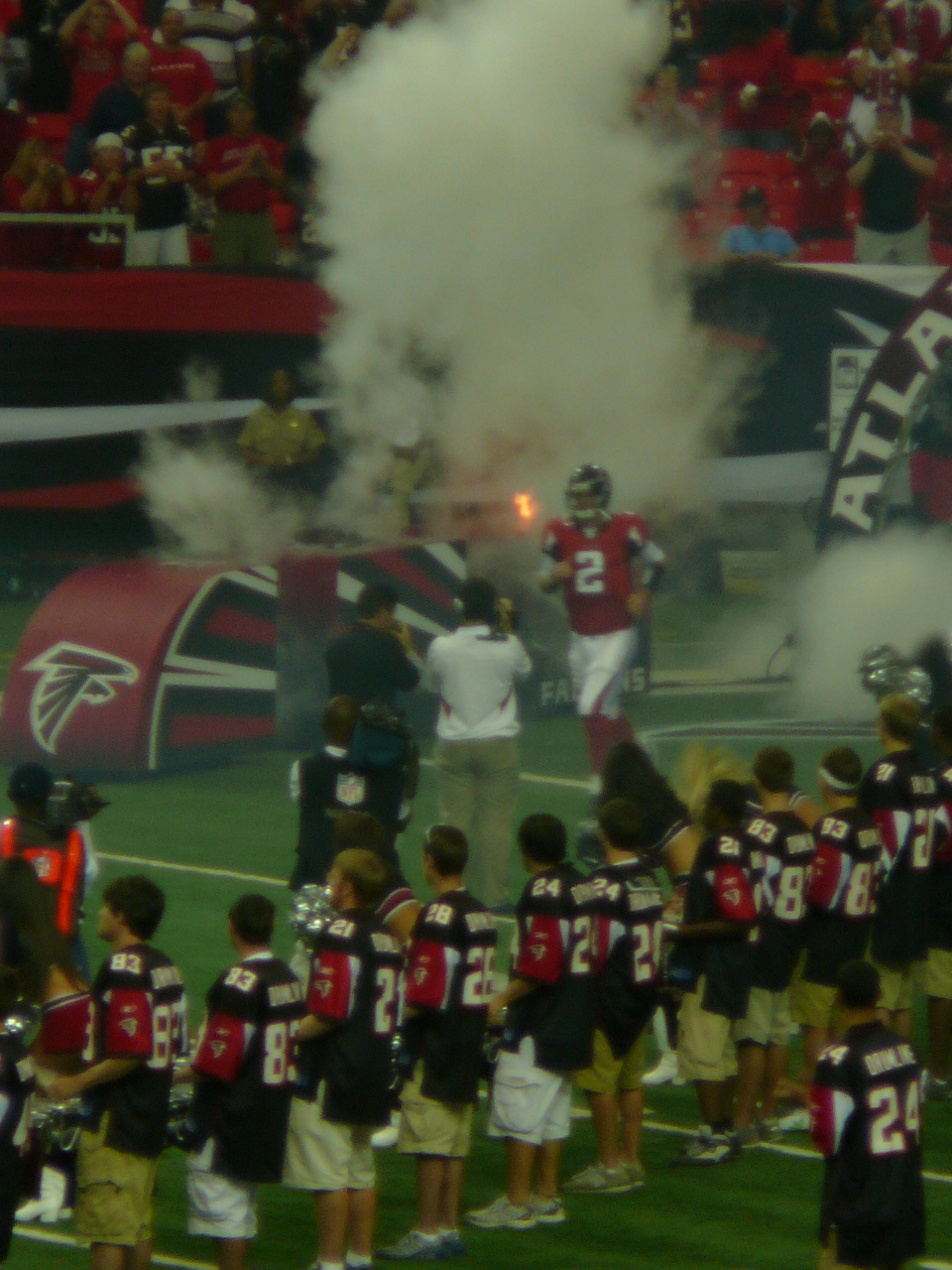
Ryan being introduced before the Falcons' 2009 regular season opener on September 13

Ryan was voted by his teammates as Offensive Captain alongside offensive lineman Todd McClure at the end of the 2008 season.

In 2009, Ryan started off the season fast as he threw for 229 yards, two touchdowns, and no interceptions as he led the Falcons to a 19–7 win against the Miami Dolphins in the 2009 NFL season opener. In Week 2, Ryan led the Falcons past the Carolina Panthers. Ryan had a career-high in touchdown passes (3), completion percentage (78%) and touchdown passes in a half (3). He finished the game 21–28 with 220 yards, three touchdowns, and an interception. In Week 3, Ryan and the Falcons lost to the New England Patriots. Ryan completed 17–28 for 199 yards with no touchdowns or interceptions in the 26–10 loss.

In the Week 5 game against the San Francisco 49ers, he completed 15 of 21 passes for 258 yards in the first half, setting a new career-high for the first half of play. Ryan finished the 45–10 victory having completed 22 of 32 passes for 329 yards and two touchdowns for a 110.0 passer rating. Ryan tossed a 31-yard strike to Roddy White, and he connected to White again in the second quarter with a 90-yard touchdown. The pass and reception for Ryan and White set new career highs. The pass and reception also mark the third longest in franchise history and the longest pass play since 2001. The game was his third-career 300-yard passing outing as the second-year quarterback set a new career-high in total passing yards with 329 in a single game.

In Weeks 6 through 9, Ryan generally struggled, throwing more interceptions (8) than touchdowns (6), was sacked 10 times, and had an average passer rating of 65.5. Still, he led the Falcons to two victories in the four games, in part thanks to Michael Turner having some strong performances.

In Week 12, Ryan suffered a turf toe injury during a game against the Tampa Bay Buccaneers. Chris Redman stepped in and managed to win the game by connecting to Roddy White for a five-yard touchdown late in the fourth quarter. Following this victory, however, the effect of Ryan's absence was compounded by injury to starting running back Michael Turner, and the Falcons suffered a 34–17 loss to the Philadelphia Eagles and a 26–23 loss to the New Orleans Saints in Weeks 13 and 14. In Week 15, Ryan returned, despite not yet having fully recovered from his injury, and led Atlanta to a 10–7 upset win against the New York Jets.

In Week 16, the Falcons defeated the Buffalo Bills in a 31–3 win. Ryan threw for 250 yards and three touchdowns, two of them to Roddy White. In the last game of the season, the Falcons defeated the Buccaneers by a score of 20–10. In the win, Ryan had 223 passing yards, two touchdowns, and two interceptions. With a record of 9–7, the Falcons attained back to back winning seasons for the first time in franchise history.

Ryan finished the season throwing for 2,916 yards with 22 touchdowns, 14 interceptions, and a quarterback rating of 80.9. Ryan also rushed for 49 yards and one touchdown.

==== 2010 ====
In the 2010 season, Ryan led the Falcons to an NFC best 13–3 record, second in the NFL behind the 14–2 New England Patriots.

Ryan's 2010 season started off slow in a 15–9 loss to the Pittsburgh Steelers. He was 27-of-44 for 252 yards and an interception. He bounced back in the next game against the Arizona Cardinals. In the 41–7 victory, he was 21-of-32 for 225 yards and three touchdowns. In Week 7, he had his most efficient game of the season in the 39–32 win over the Cincinnati Bengals. He was 24-of-33 for 299 yards, three touchdowns, and one interception for a season-high 118.1 passer rating. The victory over the Bengals was the start of an eight-game winning streak for Ryan and the Falcons. In Week 10, against the Baltimore Ravens, he passed for 316 yards and three touchdowns in the 26–21 win. After falling to the New Orleans Saints in Week 16, Ryan closed out the regular season with a 31–10 victory over the Carolina Panthers with 236 passing yards and two touchdowns.

On the season, Ryan set career highs in touchdowns (28), completion percentage (62.5), and yards (3,705) while throwing nine interceptions. Ryan set the single-season franchise records, as well as career highs in attempts (571), completions (357), and wins in a season (13). Ryan led the NFL in fourth-quarter comebacks for a quarterback in the 2010 season, with six.

In the Divisional Round, the Falcons were defeated by the eventual Super Bowl XLV champions, the Green Bay Packers, by a score of 48–21. In the loss, Ryan passed for 186 yards, one touchdown, and two interceptions.

Ryan was invited to the 2011 Pro Bowl, for the first time of his career. He threw two touchdowns in the Pro Bowl, one to Tony Gonzalez and the other to Larry Fitzgerald. He was named as the 52nd best player in the league on the NFL Top 100 Players of 2011.

==== 2011 ====
In the 2011 season, Ryan led the Falcons to a 10–6 record.

In the season opener against the Chicago Bears, Ryan was 31-of-47 for 319 yards and an interception in the 30–12 loss. However, in the next game, the Falcons bounced back with a 35–31 victory over the Philadelphia Eagles. Ryan was 17-of-28 for 195 yards with four touchdowns and two interceptions. In Weeks 10 and 11, he recorded consecutive games with at least 300 passing yards in games against the New Orleans Saints and Tennessee Titans. In Week 14, against the Carolina Panthers, he was 22-of-38 for 320 yards and four touchdowns in the 31–23 victory to his second career NFC Offensive Player of the Week honor. Ryan finished the 2011 season with 4,177 passing yards, 29 passing touchdowns, and 12 interceptions.

The Falcons' regular-season mark of 10–6 qualified them for the playoffs. However, they were defeated by the eventual Super Bowl XLVI champion New York Giants in the Wild Card Round by a score of 24–2, marking the fewest points in a postseason game in Falcons' history. In the loss, Ryan was 24-of-41 passing for 199 yards.

==== 2012 ====
In 2012, Ryan led the Falcons to their franchise best start of the season, starting 8–0. Ryan set personal records in completions (422), completion percentage (68.6), yards (4,719), and touchdowns (32).

In the 8–0 start, Ryan posted four games with three touchdown passes and three games going over the 300-yard passing mark. The first loss of the season for the Falcons came in Week 10 against the New Orleans Saints. Ryan was 34-of-52 for a then career-high 411 yards and three touchdowns and one interception as the Falcons fell by a score of 31–27. In the next game against the Arizona Cardinals, Ryan threw for 301 yards but had a career-worst five interceptions. Despite the turnovers, the Falcons won by a score of 23–19. In the penultimate game of the regular season, he was 25-of-32 for 279 yards and four touchdowns in a 31–18 victory over the Detroit Lions to his third career NFC Offensive Player of the Week nod.

The Falcons finished the regular season 13–3, with the first seed in the NFC. Ryan, who was 0–3 in the postseason coming into the playoffs, won his first postseason game in the Divisional Round against the Seattle Seahawks, with Ryan orchestrating the final scoring drive that led to Matt Bryant's game-winning 49-yard field goal. Ryan finished with 250 passing yards, 68.6% completion percentage, three touchdowns, and two interceptions in the 30–28 victory. In the NFC Championship against the San Francisco 49ers, Ryan threw for 396 yards and three touchdowns, but also committed two turnovers in crucial portions of the game, and later sprained the AC joint to his non-throwing shoulder as the Falcons lost 28–24. He did not require surgical procedure to repair his shoulder and would have been able to play in Super Bowl XLVII if the Falcons had advanced. He was named to the Pro Bowl for the second time in his career, but declined due to the shoulder injury. He was ranked #17 by his fellow players on the NFL Top 100 Players of 2013.

==== 2013 ====
On July 25, 2013, Ryan agreed to a five-year contract extension worth $103.75 million with the Falcons. On December 30, Ryan surpassed Steve Bartkowski for the all-time franchise leader in passing yards.

The Falcons had a down year, where they recorded a 4–12 record due to multiple injuries and losing key players on both sides of the ball. Ryan did record some impressive individual performances in the down season. In Week 2, against the St. Louis Rams, he had 374 passing yards and two touchdowns in the 31–24 victory. Against the New England Patriots in Week 4, he was 34-of-54 for a then career-high 421 yards with two touchdowns and one interception in the 30–23 loss. In his performance against the Patriots, Ryan became the first quarterback in franchise history to have multiple games with at least 400 passing yards. Against the Tampa Bay Buccaneers in Week 7, he was 20-of-26 for 273 yards and three touchdowns for a 148.4 passer rating in the 31–23 victory to earn NFC Offensive Player of the Week. After the victory, the Falcons were 2–4 with all the losses being by a combined 19 points. However, the rest of the season collapsed starting with five consecutive losses, which the team never recovered from. In Week 8, against the Arizona Cardinals, he had a career-high 61 pass attempts for 301 yards, one touchdown, and four interceptions in the 27–13 loss.

Overall, on the season, Ryan passed for 4,515 yards, which ranked fourth in the league, with 26 touchdowns and 17 interceptions.

==== 2014 ====
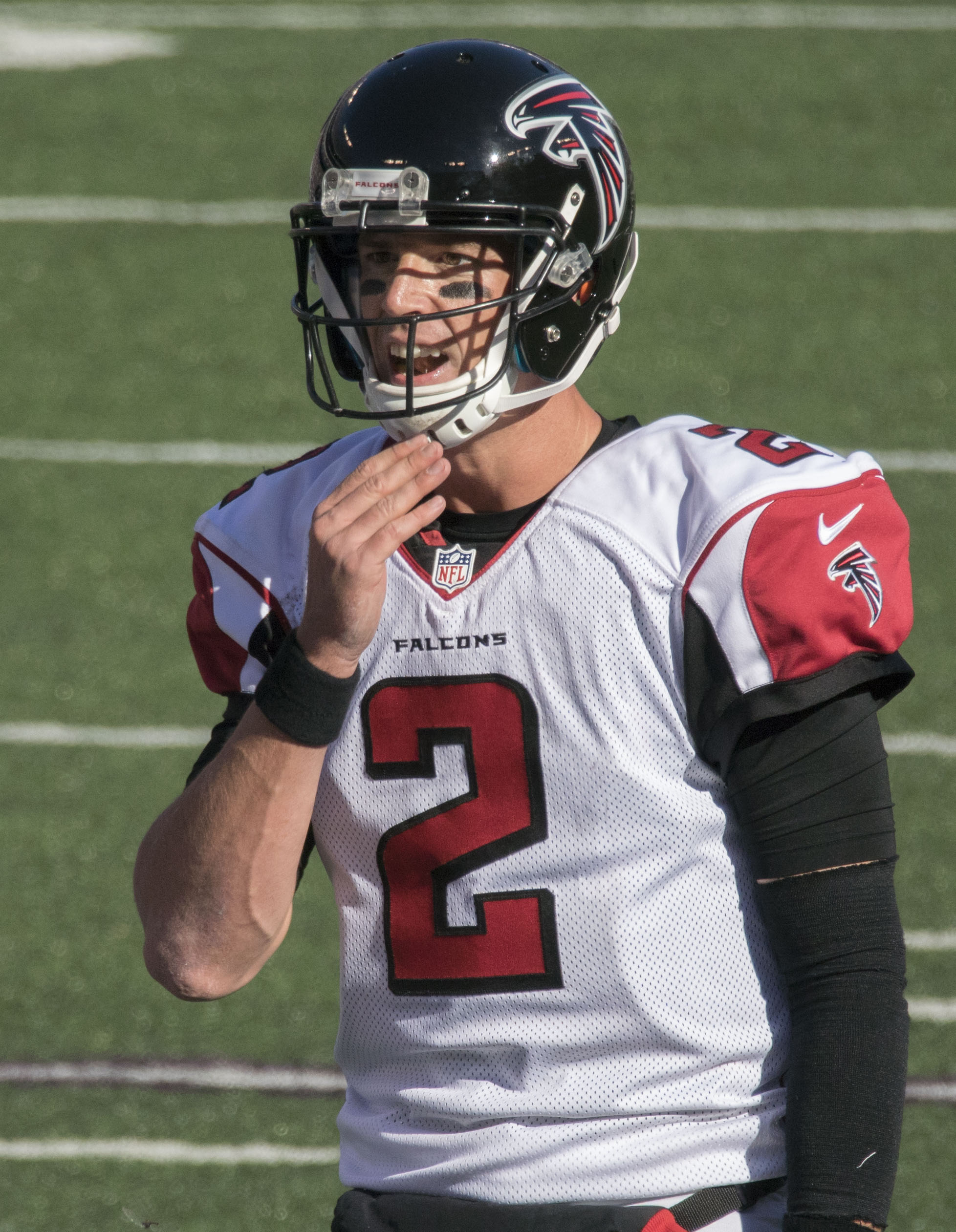
Ryan against the Ravens in 2014

Ryan led the Falcons to a 6–10 record in 2014. He threw for 4,694 yards, 28 touchdowns, and 14 interceptions, and had a quarterback rating of 93.9.

The season did start off promising with a 37–34 overtime victory over the New Orleans Saints. Ryan was 31-of-43 for a then career-high 448 yards and three touchdowns to earn NFC Offensive Player of the Week. After a 24–10 loss to the Cincinnati Bengals, the Falcons defeated the Tampa Bay Buccaneers by a score of 56–14. In the victory, Ryan was 21-of-24 for a career-high single-game completion percentage of 87.50% and had 286 yards and three touchdowns for a career-high 155.9 passer rating. He earned another NFC Offensive Player of the Week honor for his effort against the Buccaneers. The Falcons went on to lose six of their next eight games. After a much-needed 29–18 win over the Arizona Cardinals in Week 13, the Falcons faced off against the Green Bay Packers and lost 43–37 as Ryan had 375 passing yards, four touchdowns, and one interception. After a 27–20 loss to the Pittsburgh Steelers and a 30–14 victory over the New Orleans Saints, the Falcons had a 6–9 record. Despite the struggles of the 2014 season, the Falcons still had a chance to make the playoffs with a Week 17 victory due to the weakness of the entire NFC South division. However, the Falcons missed the playoffs for a second consecutive season after losing 34–3 to their divisional rival, Carolina Panthers, in Week 17. For the third time in his career, Ryan was named to the Pro Bowl. He was ranked as the 77th best player in the league among his peers on the NFL Top 100 Players of 2015.

==== 2015 ====
The 2015 season was an inconsistent one for Ryan and the Falcons. In the season opener against the Philadelphia Eagles, he was 23-of-34 for 298 yards, two touchdowns, and two interceptions in the 26–24 victory. In the next game against the New York Giants, he was 30-of-46 for 363 yards and a touchdown in the 24–20 victory. The Falcons won the next three games for a 5–0 start. Their first loss came in the sixth game with a 31–21 setback against the New Orleans Saints, where Ryan was 30-of-44 for 295 yards and two touchdowns. After a 10–7 victory over the Tennessee Titans, the Falcons dropped their next six games to send their season plummeting. In the losing streak, Ryan had a season-high 397 passing yards for two touchdowns and an interception in a 23–20 loss to the Tampa Bay Buccaneers in Week 8 on November 1. Ryan led the Falcons to an 8–8 record in 2015, good for second in the NFC South, but not enough to reach the playoffs.

Ryan finished the 2015 season with 21 touchdown passes, the second-lowest of his career, as well as 16 interceptions, the second-highest of his career. Additionally Ryan fumbled a career-high 12 times, losing five of them, which was also a career-high.

==== 2016: MVP season ====
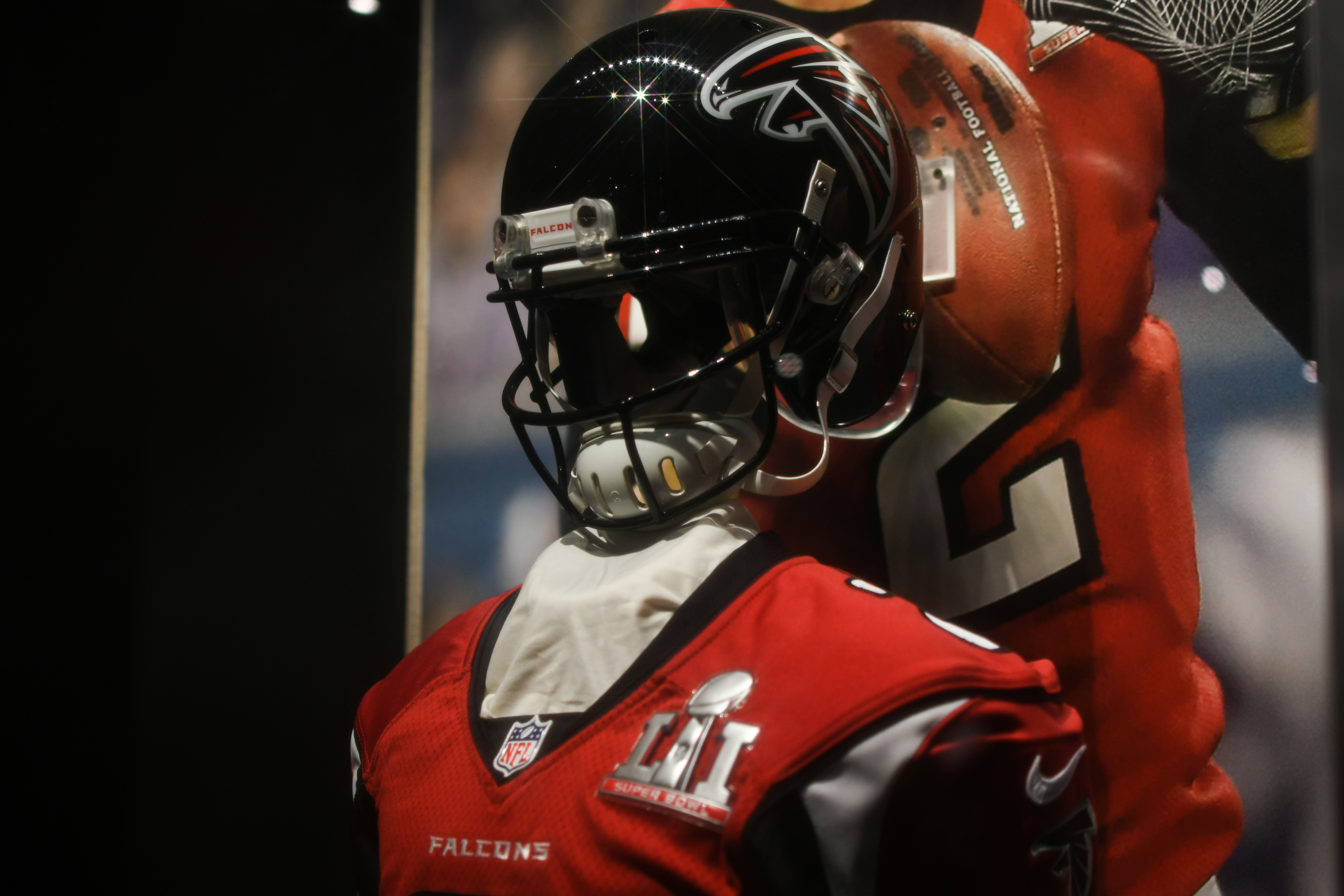
Ryan's #2 jersey worn in Super Bowl LI at the Pro Football Hall of Fame

The 2016 season was one of historically significant individual and team performance for Ryan and the Falcons. Ryan started off the 2016 season with 334 passing yards and two touchdowns in a 31–24 loss to the Tampa Bay Buccaneers. The next game, a 35–28 victory over the Oakland Raiders, he passed for 396 yards, two touchdowns, and one interception. In Week 4, Ryan threw for a team-record 503 yards and four touchdowns while teammate Julio Jones caught 12 passes for a team-record 300 yards and a touchdown in a win over the Carolina Panthers. Ryan and Jones were the first quarterback-receiver duo in NFL history to combine for at least 500 passing yards and 300 receiving yards in the same game. In October 2016, he set an NFL record for most consecutive games with at least 200 passing yards with 46 straight games. In Week 9, in a 43–28 victory over the Tampa Bay Buccaneers, he had 344 passing yards and four touchdowns to earn NFC Offensive Player of the Week. In Week 17, in a 38–32 victory over the New Orleans Saints, he had 331 passing yards and four touchdowns to earn NFC Offensive Player of the Week. Ryan improved greatly from the previous season. He threw for a career-high 4,944 yards on just 373 completions and 534 attempts, second in the league, and a career-high 38 touchdowns and a career-low seven interceptions, also second in the league. Ryan's 9.3 yards per attempt and 5.0 air yards per attempt ranked No. 1 among NFL quarterbacks in 2016. He threw a touchdown pass in all 16 games for the first time in his career and was the only quarterback to do so for the 2016 season. In the season, he threw a pass to an NFL-record 13 different receivers. Ryan was selected to his fourth Pro Bowl and was named First-team All Pro. Following the regular season, he was recognized as the NFL Most Valuable Player by the Pro Football Writers Association. Ryan was named the NFL Offensive Player of the Year and NFL Most Valuable Player for the 2016 season. He earned the Bert Bell Award for the 2016 season. He was ranked tenth by his peers on the NFL Top 100 Players of 2017.

As the #2-seed in the NFC Playoffs, Ryan led the 11–5 Falcons to a 36–20 home victory over the #3-seed Seattle Seahawks in the Divisional Round. Ryan passed for over 300 yards and had three touchdowns. In the NFC Championship, Ryan led the Falcons to a 44–21 home victory over the Green Bay Packers. Ryan threw for 392 yards, four touchdowns, and no interceptions. He also ran for a fifth touchdown, just the fourth player to do so in a post-season game, as the Falcons earned a trip to Super Bowl LI. The game against the Packers was the last one ever played at the Georgia Dome. During Super Bowl LI against the New England Patriots, Ryan finished with 284 passing yards, two touchdowns, and a lost fumble. Although the Falcons led the game 28–3 midway through the third quarter, they suffered one of the most historic collapses in sports history and lost in overtime, 34–28. Ryan became the first quarterback in franchise history to pass for over 1,000 yards in a single postseason. Of the quarterbacks to achieve the feat, he achieved the highest passer rating, 135.3, and joined Joe Flacco as the only ones to not throw a single interception.

==== 2017 ====
On September 10, 2017, in the season opening 23–17 victory over the Chicago Bears at Soldier Field, Ryan connected with tight end Austin Hooper for an 88-yard touchdown, which was the second-longest touchdown pass of Ryan's career. In the game, Ryan was 21-of-30 for 321 yards and the one touchdown. In Week 2, Ryan and the Falcons had their first home game at the new Mercedes-Benz Stadium. Against the Green Bay Packers, Ryan was 19-of-28 for 252 yards and a touchdown, which was thrown to running back Tevin Coleman and the first touchdown ever thrown in the new stadium. The Falcons won by a score of 34–23. In Week 7, in a Super Bowl LI rematch against the New England Patriots, Ryan passed for 233 yards and a passing touchdown to go along with a career-high 37 rushing yards in the 23–7 loss. In Week 10, during a 27–7 win over the Dallas Cowboys, Ryan became the fastest quarterback to throw for over 40,000 passing yards. This was done in 151 games breaking Drew Brees' record which was done in 152 games. In Week 17, after clinching a spot in the playoffs by beating the Carolina Panthers 22–10, Ryan set the record for most passing yards through 10 seasons with 41,796, breaking the record held by Peyton Manning, who had 41,626.

Ryan led the Falcons to a road victory against the Los Angeles Rams in the Wild Card Round by a score of 26–13. A week later, Ryan passed for 210 yards and one touchdown as the Falcons lost to the eventual Super Bowl champion Philadelphia Eagles 15–10 in the NFC Divisional Round. Ryan was ranked 29th by his fellow players on the NFL Top 100 Players of 2018.

==== 2018 ====
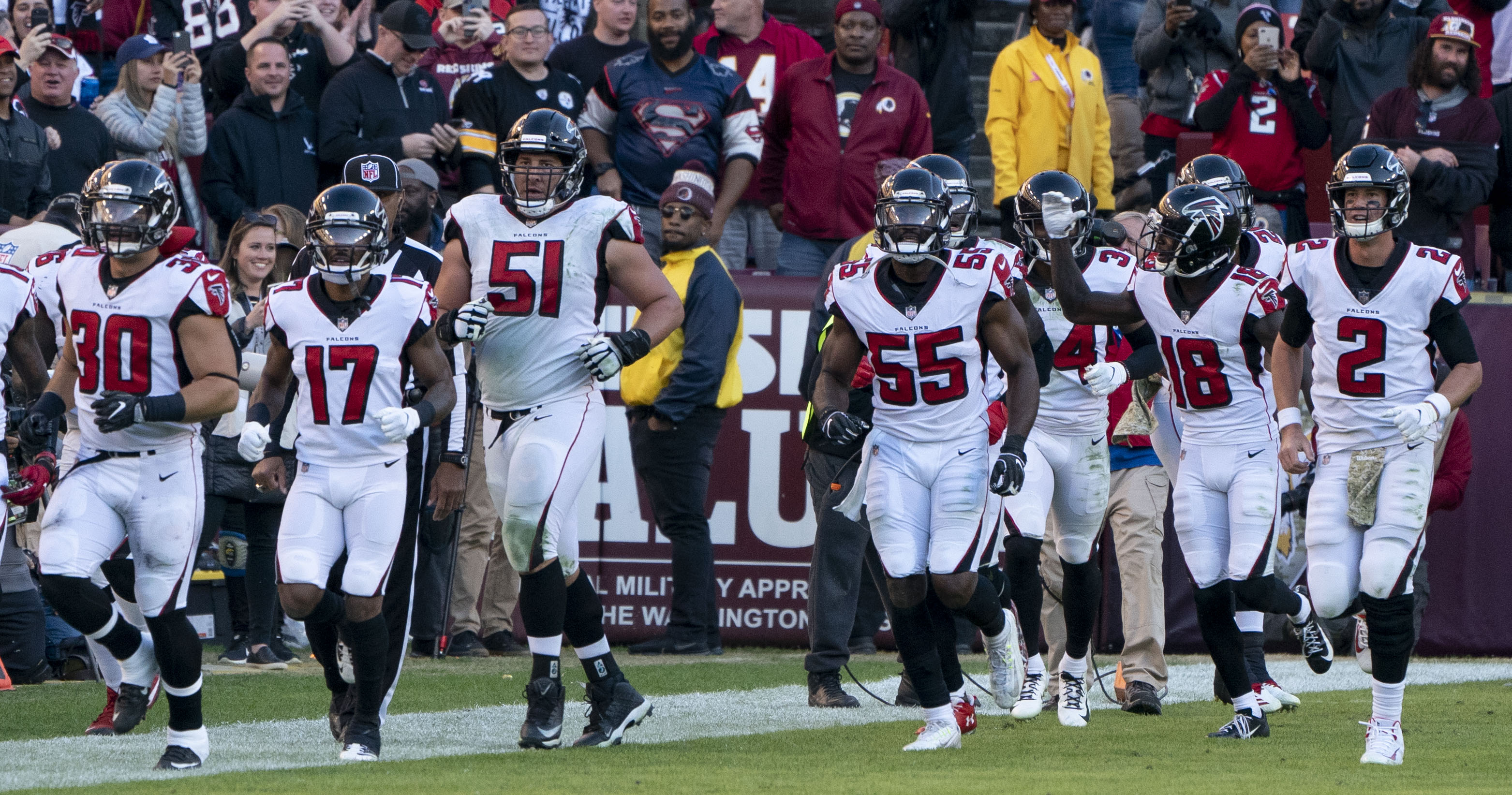
Ryan and his teammates in a game against the Washington Redskins

On May 3, 2018, Ryan signed a five-year, $150 million contract with the Falcons with $100 million guaranteed, making him the first player to average at least $30 million per year. In Week 2, a 31–24 victory over the Carolina Panthers, Ryan recorded two rushing touchdowns, a one-yard score in the third quarter and an eight-yard score in the fourth quarter, in a single game for the first time in his professional career. In addition, he had 272 passing yards, two passing touchdowns, and an interception in the win. In Week 3, in a 43–37 overtime loss to the New Orleans Saints, Ryan passed for 374 yards and a career-high five touchdowns. In Week 4, against the Cincinnati Bengals, he had 419 passing yards and three touchdowns in a tough 37–36 loss where the Bengals scored a go-ahead touchdown with seven seconds remaining. In Week 7, against the New York Giants, he had 379 passing yards and one passing touchdown in the 23–20 victory. In Week 10, against the Cleveland Browns, he had a career-high 38 completions on 52 attempts for 330 yards and two touchdowns in the 28–16 loss. In Week 12, against the New Orleans Saints on Thanksgiving, he had 377 passing yards, two touchdowns, and one interception in the 31–17 loss. In a Week 14 34–20 loss to the Green Bay Packers, Ryan eclipsed 4,000 yards, becoming the third quarterback in NFL history to reach 4,000 in at least eight consecutive seasons, joining Drew Brees (2006–2017) and Peyton Manning (2006–2014). In Week 15, a 40–14 victory over the Arizona Cardinals, Ryan recorded two passing touchdowns as well as a rushing touchdown, giving him a career-high three rushing touchdowns for the season. In addition, this victory gave Ryan 100 regular season wins, and made Ryan and Thomas Dimitroff only the sixth quarterback-general manager duo to record at least 100 wins together. In Week 17, a 34–32 victory of the Tampa Bay Buccaneers, in addition to passing for 378 yards, two touchdowns, and one interception, Ryan recorded his first career reception on a five-yard touchdown pass from wide receiver Mohamed Sanu. With the touchdown reception, Ryan set an NFL record for most passing yards in a game while recording a receiving touchdown.

Ryan finished the 2018 season with 35 passing touchdowns, three rushing touchdowns, and one receiving touchdown, giving him a career-high 39 total touchdowns on the season. In addition, the seven interceptions thrown by Ryan are tied for his career best. Despite a losing 7–9 record, Ryan finished with the third most passing yards, tied for the third most passing touchdowns, fourth in completion percentage, and fourth in passer rating. Ryan was named a Pro Bowl alternate for the season, although Ryan declined the invitation upon being selected. He was ranked 69th by his fellow players on the NFL Top 100 Players of 2019.

==== 2019 ====
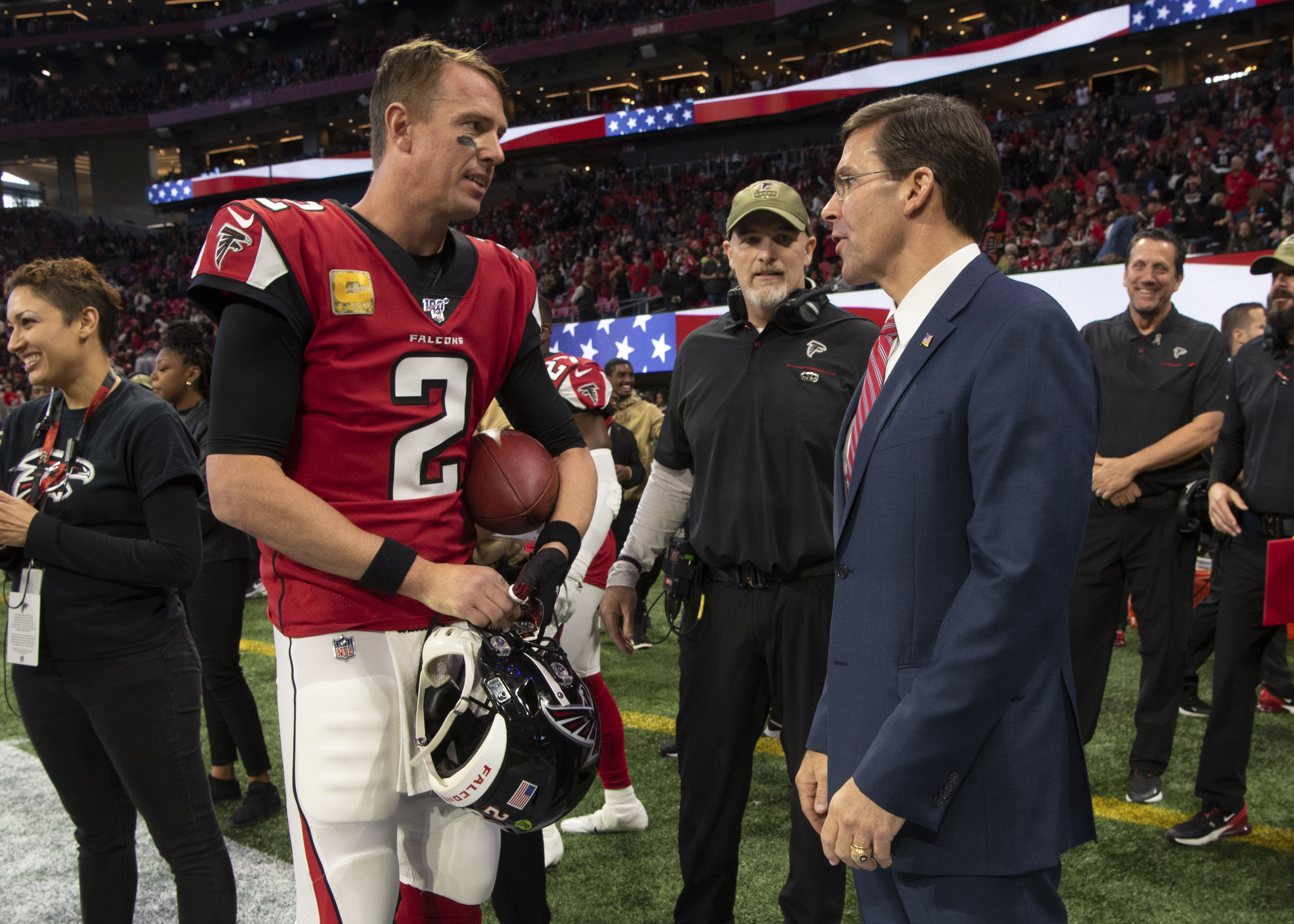
Ryan speaking to Defense Secretary Mark Esper in 2019

On March 12, the Falcons restructured Ryan's contract by converting $8.75 million of his base salary into a signing bonus.

In Week 1 against the Minnesota Vikings, Ryan completed 33-of-46 passes for 304 yards, two passing touchdowns, and two interceptions in the 28–12 loss. In Week 2 against the Philadelphia Eagles, Ryan threw for 320 yards, three touchdowns, and three interceptions as the Falcons won 24–20. On fourth down with two minutes left in the game, Ryan threw a 54-yard touchdown pass to Julio Jones that ended giving the Falcons the late go-ahead score. In Week 3 against the Indianapolis Colts, Ryan threw for 304 yards, three touchdowns, and one interception as the Falcons lost 27–24. In Week 4, in a 24–10 loss to the Tennessee Titans, Ryan passed for 397 yards. In Week 5 against the Houston Texans, Ryan threw for 330 yards, three passing touchdowns, and one interception while adding a rushing touchdown in the 53–32 loss. Ryan became the first Falcons quarterback since Chris Miller in 1990 to pass for over 300 yards and have three passing touchdowns and a rushing touchdown in the same game. In Week 6 against the Arizona Cardinals, he passed for 356 yards and four touchdowns in a 34–33 loss. In Week 7 against the Los Angeles Rams, Ryan suffered an ankle injury. Without Ryan, the Falcons lost 37–10.

Ryan was ruled out with an ankle injury in Week 8 against the Seattle Seahawks, ending Ryan's streak of 154 consecutive regular season games started. The streak was fifth all-time for quarterbacks. Ryan returned from injury in Week 10 against the New Orleans Saints and threw for 182 yards, two touchdowns, and one interception in the 26–9 upset win. In Week 11 against the Carolina Panthers, Ryan threw for 311 yards and a touchdown in the 29–3 win. In the game, Ryan surpassed Warren Moon for the 10th all time passing yards in NFL history. In Week 13 against the Carolina Panthers, Ryan threw for 313 yards and two touchdowns, including a career long 93-yard touchdown to Olamide Zaccheaus in the 40–20 win. In the game, Ryan became the 10th quarterback in NFL history to reach 50,000 career passing yards. In Week 15 against the heavily favored San Francisco 49ers, Ryan helped lead a 29–22 upset victory. In the last moments of the game, Ryan threw a five-yard pass to Julio Jones to go ahead before a defensive score put the game away for good. In Week 16 against the Jacksonville Jaguars, Ryan passed for 384 yards, one touchdown, and two interceptions in the 24–12 victory. In Week 17 against the Tampa Bay Buccaneers, Ryan threw for 313 yards and a touchdown during the 28–22 overtime win. Ryan finished the 2019 season with 4,466 passing yards, 26 touchdowns, and 14 interceptions as the Falcons finished with a 7–9 record. Ryan's 408 pass completions led the NFL.

==== 2020 ====
In Week 1 against the Seattle Seahawks, Ryan completed 37-of-52 for 450 passing yards, two touchdowns, and an interception in the 25–38 loss. In the game, Ryan surpassed John Elway for the 9th most all time passing yards in NFL history. In the loss, Ryan helped lead three different wide receivers (Julio Jones, Calvin Ridley, and Russell Gage) to surpass 100 receiving yards. It was the first time in franchise history that three different wide receivers hit the mark in the same game. In Week 2 against the Dallas Cowboys, Ryan threw for 273 yards and four touchdowns in the 40–39 loss. At one point during the game, Ryan and the Falcons had a 20-point lead, but they still managed to lose the game. The Falcons dropped their next three games to start 0–5 for the first time since 1997. In Week 6 against the Minnesota Vikings, he had 371 passing yards and four passing touchdowns in the 40–23 victory, the Falcons' first of the 2020 season. Ryan was named the NFC Offensive Player of the Week for his performance in Week 6. Following the Vikings game, Ryan recorded three games with at least 300 passing yards the rest of the season. The Falcons showed positive signs winning three of four from Weeks 6–9, but they closed out the season on a separate five-game losing streak. Overall, Ryan finished the 2020 season with 4,581 passing yards, 26 touchdowns, and 11 interceptions as the team went 4–12. He led the league in both passes completed on passes attempts going 407-of-626.

==== 2021 ====
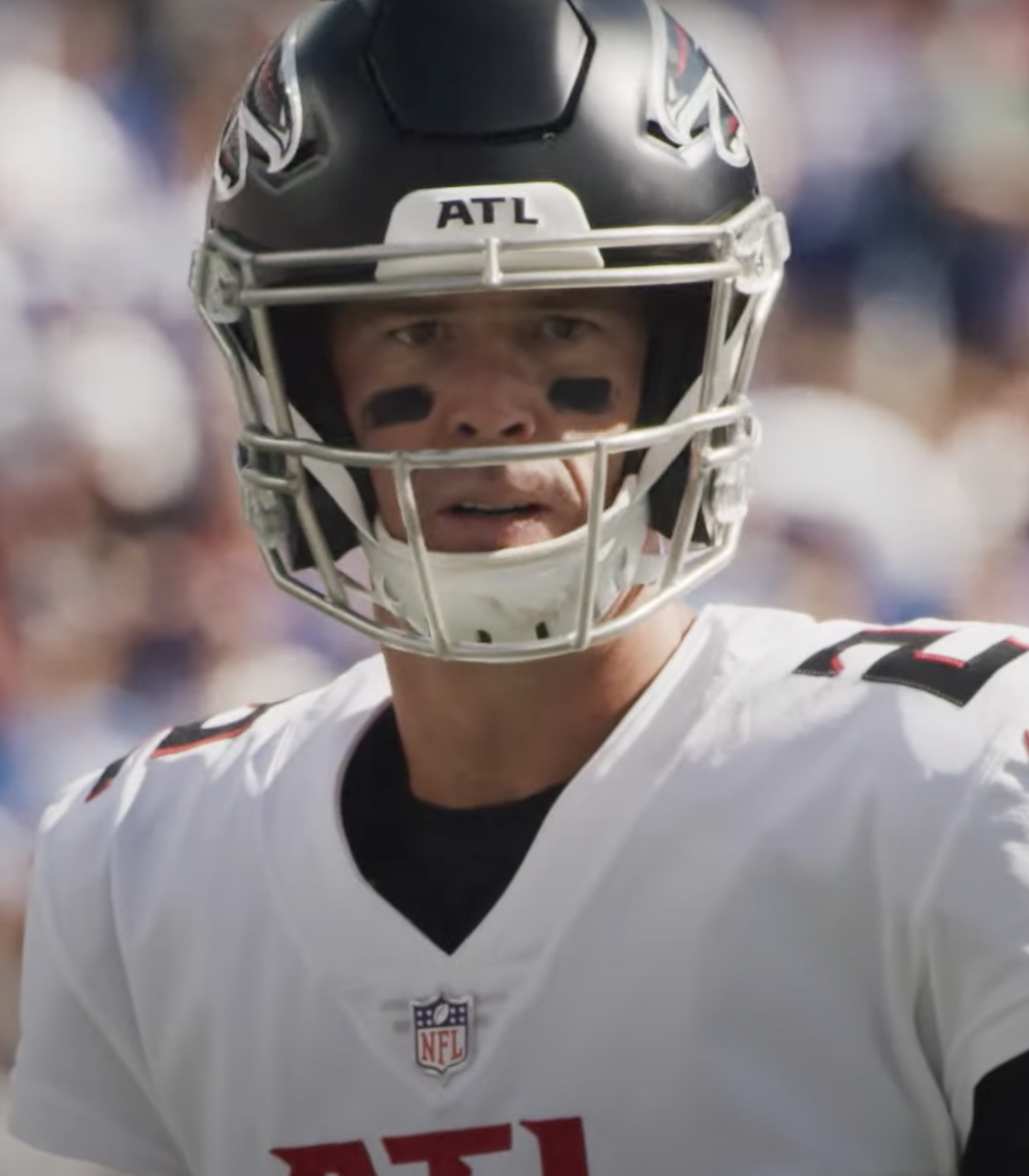
Ryan in 2021

With the departure of longtime teammate Julio Jones, Ryan struggled to find consistency in his first year with new head coach Arthur Smith. Ryan and Falcons started the season with a 1–3 mark. In Week 5 against the New York Jets, Ryan became the seventh quarterback in NFL history to reach 5,000 career completions. In the same game, Ryan surpassed Eli Manning for the 8th most all-time passing yards in NFL history. Following the victory over the Jets, the Falcons reached .500 with a win in their next game over the Miami Dolphins, with Ryan passing for 336 yards and two touchdowns. In Week 9 against the New Orleans Saints, Ryan had 343 passing yards, two passing touchdowns, and one rushing touchdown in the 27–25 victory. Ryan was named NFC Offensive Player of the Week for his performance. The Falcons offense would be anemic in the next two games, as they were held to a field goal against the Dallas Cowboys and then were shut out by the New England Patriots, with Ryan held to less than 200 yards in both games. The Falcons alternated wins and losses going into Week 17.

During the Week 17 game against the Buffalo Bills, Ryan was called for a taunting penalty after seemingly scoring a rushing touchdown, but after further review, he was ruled down at the 1-yard line, and the resulting 15-yard penalty put Atlanta back at the 16-yard-line instead of being enforced on the ensuing kickoff. The Falcons failed to score from that distance on the next two plays, all but sealing a 29–15 loss that eliminated them from the playoffs. Ryan finished the 2021 season with 3,968 passing yards, 20 touchdowns, and 12 interceptions.

=== Indianapolis Colts ===
On March 21, 2022, the Falcons traded Ryan to the Indianapolis Colts for a third-round pick in the 2022 NFL draft. The Colts had just traded away their starting quarterback Carson Wentz after losing their last two games of the 2021 season which eliminated them from the playoffs, causing owner Jim Irsay to regard Wentz's single season as a failure. Irsay lauded Ryan's experience and leadership and hoped that Ryan would remain as a starter with the Colts for four seasons. Irsay sent his private jet to Atlanta to bring Ryan and his family to Indianapolis, and the Colts held an unusually large press conference to announce Ryan's arrival that predicted an upcoming successful season.

In his first game with the Colts in Week 1 against the Houston Texans, Ryan finished with 352 passing yards, a touchdown, and an interception as the game ended in a 20–20 tie. He surpassed 60,000 passing yards, becoming the second fastest to ever do so. In Week 2, the Colts were shut out by the Jacksonville Jaguars 24-0. In Week 6 against the Jacksonville Jaguars, Ryan finished with 389 passing yards and three touchdowns in the 34–27 victory, including throwing the game-winning touchdown to Alec Pierce with 17 seconds remaining. In the game, he passed Dan Marino for seventh all-time in passing yards. Following a Week 7 loss to the Tennessee Titans, head coach Frank Reich announced Ryan had a shoulder injury and Sam Ehlinger would be the Colts starting quarterback for the remainder of the 2022 season. However two weeks later, Reich was fired and interim coach Jeff Saturday announced Ryan would return as the team's starter. In a 25–20 victory over the Las Vegas Raiders, Ryan threw the game-winning touchdown pass to Parris Campbell with five minutes remaining, on a drive which included a career-best 39-yard run by Ryan to convert a third down. In a game against the Minnesota Vikings, Ryan and the Colts jumped to a 33–0 lead at halftime before having a historic collapse, allowing the Vikings to make the largest comeback in NFL history and win 39–36 in overtime. Ryan finished with 182 yards and a touchdown in the game. It turned out to be Ryan's final appearance in the NFL as following this loss, Saturday announced that Nick Foles would be the starting quarterback for the last three games of the season and that Ehlinger would be his backup, placing Ryan on the third line.

Ryan appeared in 12 games in the 2022 season. He finished with 3,057 passing yards, 14 touchdowns, and 13 interceptions. Ryan's 14 passing touchdowns marked a career-low for a single season. Ryan's struggles at quarterback were attributed to a depleted offensive line, and one of the youngest groups of receivers and tight ends in the league, causing opposing teams' pass rush to get to Ryan which severely impacting his decision-making and caused him to carry too much of the load. Ryan's decreased arm strength and shoulder injury, as well as trying to avoid the turnovers that plagued his early games with the Colts, also reduced his average passing yards. After being directed by Irsay to bench Ryan, Reich told Ryan privately "We did not hold up to our end of the bargain. You came here and we promised you a top NFL rushing game and we promised you great protection, and we haven't really, as an offense, delivered on that. And that really starts with me". Despite being demoted to the third on the quarterback depth chart, Ryan did not ask for a trade nor ask to be released. Colts teammates praised Ryan's leadership despite being benched, as center Ryan Kelly said "Seeing him sit there after the benching, it's just an awful feeling. The guy's had such an incredible career, and it's a hard pill to swallow. But his ability to come out and not sulk and not draw attention, to just be consistent ... I think that was huge. And that takes a lot. You had to put your ego aside and put your pride aside, and that's a hard thing to do -- especially when you've been in the league for 15 years."

Following the season, on March 15, 2023, Ryan was released by the Colts.

For the 2023 season, the Colts still owed Ryan over $12 million as part of the agreed terms of the trade made the previous year, as Ryan had opted not to officially announce his retirement.

=== Retirement ===
Following the 2023 season, on April 22, 2024, Ryan officially announced his retirement and signed a one-day contract with Atlanta to retire as a Falcon. Ryan was later inducted into the Falcons Ring of Honor at halftime during a Falcons' home game on October 3, 2024.

== Broadcasting career ==
On May 15, 2023, Ryan was hired by CBS as a football analyst. He joined the network's The NFL Today pre-game show for the 2024 season. He left the role upon becoming president of football for the Atlanta Falcons.

== Executive career ==
On January 10, 2026, Ryan was named president of football for his old organization, the Atlanta Falcons. His role includes overseeing all aspects of football for the organization, reporting directly to team owner Arthur Blank while collaborating with Falcons President and CEO Greg Beadles. Both the head coach and general manager will report to Ryan.

== Career statistics ==
Legend
	AP NFL MVP & OPOTY
	Led the league
**Bold**	Career high

=== NFL ===
==== Regular season ====
Year	Team	Games			Passing									Rushing					Sacks		Fumbles	
Year	Team	GP	GS	Record	Cmp	Att	Pct	Yds	Y/A	Lng	TD	Int	Rtg	Att	Yds	Avg	Lng	TD	Sck	Yds	Fum	Lost
2008	ATL	16	16	11–5	265	434	61.1	3,440	7.9	70	16	11	87.7	**55**	104	1.9	17	1	17	104	6	1
2009	ATL	14	14	9–5	263	451	58.3	2,916	6.5	90	22	14	80.9	30	49	1.6	7	1	19	92	5	2
2010	ATL	16	16	**13–3**	357	571	62.5	3,705	6.5	46	28	9	91.0	46	122	2.7	20	0	23	158	4	3
2011	ATL	16	16	10–6	347	566	61.3	4,177	7.4	80	29	12	92.2	37	84	2.3	12	2	26	173	5	3
2012	ATL	16	16	**13–3**	422	615	68.6	4,719	7.7	80	32	14	99.1	34	141	4.1	16	1	28	210	3	2
2013	ATL	16	16	4–12	**439**	**651**	67.4	4,515	6.9	81	26	**17**	89.6	17	55	3.2	17	0	44	298	5	4
2014	ATL	16	16	6–10	415	628	66.1	4,694	7.5	79	28	14	93.9	29	145	**5.0**	15	0	31	205	5	2
2015	ATL	16	16	8–8	407	614	66.3	4,591	7.5	70	21	16	89.0	36	63	1.8	18	0	30	203	12	**5**
2016	ATL	16	16	11–5	373	534	**69.9**	**4,944**	**9.3**	76	**38**	7	**117.1**	35	117	3.3	18	0	37	235	4	2
2017	ATL	16	16	10–6	342	529	64.7	4,095	7.7	88	20	12	91.4	32	143	4.5	16	0	24	156	4	3
2018	ATL	16	16	7–9	422	608	69.4	4,924	8.1	75	35	7	108.1	33	125	3.8	15	**3**	42	296	10	**5**
2019	ATL	15	15	7–8	408	616	66.2	4,466	7.3	**93**	26	14	92.1	34	**147**	4.3	12	1	**48**	**316**	9	**5**
2020	ATL	16	16	4–12	407	626	65.0	4,581	7.3	63	26	11	93.3	29	92	3.2	16	2	41	257	6	3
2021	ATL	17	17	7–10	375	560	67.0	3,968	7.1	64	20	12	90.4	40	82	2.1	17	1	40	274	11	4
2022	IND	12	12	4–7–1	309	461	67.0	3,057	6.6	45	14	13	83.9	27	70	2.6	**39**	1	38	287	**15**	**5**
Career		234	234	124−109−1	5,551	8,464	65.6	62,792	7.4	93	381	183	93.6	514	1,539	3.0	39	13	488	3,264	104	49

==== Postseason ====
Year	Team	Games			Passing									Rushing					Sacks		Fumbles	
Year	Team	GP	GS	Record	Cmp	Att	Pct	Yds	Y/A	Lng	TD	Int	Rtg	Att	Yds	Avg	Lng	TD	Sck	Yds	Fum	Lost
2008	ATL	1	1	0–1	26	40	65.0	199	5.0	28	2	2	72.8	4	6	1.5	2	0	3	9	1	**1**
2010	ATL	1	1	0–1	20	29	69.0	186	6.4	22	1	2	69.0	1	0	0.0	0	0	5	37	1	**1**
2011	ATL	1	1	0–1	24	41	58.5	199	4.9	21	0	0	71.1	3	3	1.0	3	0	2	16	0	0
2012	ATL	2	2	1–1	54	77	70.1	646	8.4	47	6	**3**	105.2	3	9	3.0	6	0	1	0	1	**1**
2016	ATL	3	3	**2–1**	**70**	**98**	**71.4**	**1,014**	**10.3**	**73**	**9**	0	**135.3**	**6**	**20**	**3.3**	**14**	**1**	**8**	**59**	**3**	**1**
2017	ATL	2	2	1–1	43	66	65.2	428	6.5	52	2	0	93.5	**6**	5	0.8	4	0	6	35	0	0
Career		10	10	4–6	237	351	67.5	2,672	7.6	73	20	7	100.8	23	43	1.9	14	1	25	156	6	4

=== College ===
Year	Team	Games			Passing								Rushing			
Year	Team	GP	GS	Record	Cmp	Att	Pct	Yds	Y/A	TD	Int	Rtg	Att	Yds	Avg	TD
2003	Boston College	0	0	—	Redshirted (redshirt)											
2004	Boston College	7	1	0–1	35	71	49.3	350	4.9	2	3	91.5	12	−3	−0.3	0
2005	Boston College	10	5	5–0	121	195	**62.1**	1,514	**7.8**	8	5	**135.7**	37	**94**	**2.5**	**5**
2006	Boston College	12	12	9–3	263	427	61.6	2,942	6.9	15	10	126.4	51	−35	−0.7	4
2007	Boston College	14	14	11–3	**388**	**654**	59.3	**4,507**	6.9	**31**	**19**	127.0	**68**	2	0.0	2
Career		43	32	25–7	807	1,347	59.9	9,313	6.9	56	37	126.2	168	58	0.3	11

== Career highlights ==
=== Awards and honors ===
NFL

- NFL Most Valuable Player (2016)
- NFC champion (2016)
- NFL Offensive Player of the Year (2016)
- AP NFL Offensive Rookie of the Year (2008)
- First-team All-Pro (2016)
- 4× Pro Bowl selections (2010, 2012, 2014, 2016)
- NFL passer rating leader (2016)
- NFL completion percentage co-leader (2012)
- Total quarterback rating leader: (2016)
- Bert Bell Award (2016)
- PFWA Offensive Player of the Year (2016)
- PFWA Offensive Rookie of the Year (2008)
- FedEx Air Player of the Year (2016)
- 3× Pepsi NFL Rookie of the Week winner
- Pepsi NFL Rookie of the Week winner (2008)
- NFC Rookie of the Month (October 2008)
- Sporting News NFL Rookie of the Year (2008)
- Sporting News All-Rookie Team (2008)
- NFC Offensive Player of the Month (November 2010, September 2012, September 2016)
- Rookie of the Year by Sporting News (2008)
- ESPY Award: Best Breakthrough Athlete (2009)
- NEXT Athlete Award (ESPN The Magazine) (2009)
- NFC Player of the Month (November 2010)
- 10× NFC Offensive Player of the Week
- 6× NFL Top 100 — 52nd (2011), 17th (2013), 77th (2015), 10th (2017), 29th (2018), 69th (2019)

College

- MPC Computers Bowl MVP (2005)
- First-team All-ACC selection (2006)
- Manning Award (2007)
- Johnny Unitas Golden Arm Award (2007)
- First-team All-America by AFCA (2007)
- ACC Player of the Year (2007)
- First-team All-ACC selection (2007)
- 6× ACC Player of the Week (2007)

=== NFL records ===
- Most regular season wins by a quarterback in his first five seasons: 56 (tied with Russell Wilson)
- Consecutive NFL games with at least 200 passing yards (64 games)
- Most passing yards in first 10 years in NFL history (41,796)
- Most passing yards in first 11 years in NFL history (46,720)
- Most passing yards in first 12 years in NFL history (51,186)
- Most passing yards in first 13 years in NFL history (55,767)
- Most passing yards in first 14 years in NFL history (59,735)
- Most pass completions in first 7 years in NFL history (2,508)
- Most pass completions in first 8 years in NFL history (2,915)
- Most pass completions in first 9 years in NFL history (3,288)
- Most pass completions in first 10 years in NFL history (3,630)
- Most pass completions in first 11 years in NFL history (4,052)
- Most pass completions in first 12 years in NFL history (4,460)
- Most pass completions in first 13 years in NFL history (4,867)
- Most pass completions in first 14 years in NFL history (5,242)
- Most pass completions in first 15 years in NFL history (5,551)
- Most matchups against a single quarterback in the Super Bowl era: 23, against Drew Brees

=== Falcons franchise records ===
- Only Falcons quarterback to lead the team to an 8–0 start
- Most wins in a regular season by a starting quarterback: 13 (2010 and 2012)
- Fewest interceptions in a regular season by starting quarterback – 7 (2016 and 2018) (16 starts)
- Most comeback wins in a single season: 5 (2010) (tied with Steve Bartkowski in 1979)
- Most career quarterback wins: 120 (2008–2021)
- Completions: career (5,242), season (439 in 2013), playoffs (194), playoff season (70 in 2016), playoff game (30 on January 20, 2013, against the San Francisco 49ers), rookie season (265 in 2008)
- Pass Attempts: career (8,464), season (651 in 2013), playoffs (285), playoff season (98 in 2016), rookie season (434 in 2008)
- Passing Yards: career (59,735), season (4,944 in 2016), playoffs (2,244), playoff season (1,014 in 2016), playoff game (396 on January 20, 2013, against the San Francisco 49ers), rookie season (3,440 in 2008)
- Passing TDs: career (367), season (38 in 2016), playoffs (18), playoff season (9 in 2016), playoff game (4 on January 22, 2017, against the Green Bay Packers), rookie season (16 in 2008)
- Passer Rating: career (93.7), season (117.1 in 2016), playoffs (102.4), playoff season (135.3 in 2016), playoff game (144.1 on February 5, 2017, against the New England Patriots), rookie season (87.7 in 2008), rookie game (138.4 on November 2, 2008, against the Oakland Raiders)
- Sacked: playoffs (19), playoff game (5 on February 5, 2017, against the New England Patriots)
- Yds/Pass Att: playoffs (7.87), playoff season (10.35 in 2016), playoff game (12.35 on February 5, 2017, against the New England Patriots), rookie season (7.93 in 2008)
- Pass Yds/Game: career (269.1), season (309 in 2016), rookie season (215 in 2008)
- 300+ yard passing games: career (45), season (8 in 2012 & 2016), playoffs (3), rookie season (2 in 2008)
- 4,000+ passing yard seasons: career (10)

== Personal life ==
Ryan, the third of four siblings, was born to Michael and Bernice Ryan. They are of Irish descent and were raised as Catholics. One of Ryan's uncles, John Loughery, played quarterback at Boston College from 1979 to 1982. Ryan is an avid golfer and has participated in such tournaments as the American Century Celebrity Golf Classic. His cousin, Mike McGlinchey, played college football for the Notre Dame Fighting Irish and was later drafted by the San Francisco 49ers in 2018.

He is part of the Falcons' online reading program, "Read with a Falcon," and grew up a fan of the Philadelphia Eagles.

On November 21, 2017, Ryan announced on social media that he and his wife Sarah were expecting twins. In 2018, Sarah announced the birth of their twin boys. Ryan and his wife quietly welcomed their third son Cal Patrick Ryan on April 1, 2023.

On January 9, 2019, Ryan made a cameo appearance on the series premiere of ABC's Schooled, and his high school athletic career is also explored in the series.

In June 2020, Ryan donated $500,000 to a GoFundMe that he started to help advance the lives of people in the black community of Atlanta.

Awards and achievements
Preceded by Adrian Peterson	Best Breakthrough Athlete ESPY Award; 2009	Succeeded by Chris Johnson
Preceded by Josh Beekman	Scanlan Award; 2007	Succeeded by Brandon Robinson
