= NEXT Athlete =

Annual sports awards

The NEXT Athlete award was given out every year by ESPN the Magazine to one or more athletes chosen as a future leader or trailblazer in their sport. The winning athlete(s) was featured on the cover of the late January issue of ESPN the Magazine. On April 30, 2019, ESPN announced that it would cease paper publishing in September of that year. A multiplatform monthly story called ESPN Cover Story was launched to continue the magazine's legacy featuring a digital poster-style cover and profile in cover story fashion, including the continuation of NEXT Athlete proclamations and The Body Issue, but these two features did not return.

Historically, the winners of this award have gone on to exceptional careers, or at the very least early success in their careers, with the exception of a few.

== Past Winners/Nominees ==
Year	Athlete	Follow-Up/Career Highlights
1998	Kobe Bryant, G, Los Angeles Lakers	Along with Shaquille O'Neal, led the Lakers to three NBA Championships from 2000 to 2002. Set second highest single game scoring mark with 81 pts scored against the Toronto Raptors in January 2006. 07-08 NBA MVP
	Alex Rodriguez, SS, Seattle Mariners	Three-time AL MVP, Signed the largest contract in MLB history.
	Kordell Stewart, QB, Pittsburgh Steelers	Never achieved QB rating higher than 82.8 as a starter. Played as a quarterback, running back, receiver, and returner during his career.
	Eric Lindros, C, Philadelphia Flyers	Six-time all-star, Hart Memorial Trophy recipient for MVP
1999	Keith Van Horn, F, Philadelphia 76ers	2nd in Rookie of the Year voting behind Tim Duncan. Had moderately successful career with five different teams
	Randy Moss, WR, Minnesota Vikings	Five-time Pro Bowler; Set records for touchdowns and receiving yards for a rookie and broke record for most receiving touchdowns in a season.
2000	Vince Carter, G/F, Toronto Raptors	1999 NBA Rookie of the Year. 2000 Slam Dunk Contest Champion. Seven-time All-Star
2001	Yao Ming, C, Houston Rockets	#1 NBA Draft Pick, Four-time All-Star
2002	Brian Urlacher, LB, Chicago Bears	2005 NFL Defensive Player of the Year
2003	LeBron James, F, Cleveland Cavaliers	#1 Overall NBA Draft Pick. Rookie of the Year. 2006 All Star Game MVP (youngest ever). Lead his team to first NBA Finals in 2007.
2004	Kazuo Matsui, SS, New York Mets	Batted .255 for the Mets before being cut.
2005	Adrian Peterson, RB, Oklahoma Sooners	Heisman candidate as a freshman while setting NCAA freshman rushing record. Broke NFL record for rushing yards in a game as a rookie with Minnesota.
2006	Reggie Bush, RB, USC Trojans	Heisman Winner, #2 NFL Draft Pick, rushed for 1,146 yards and 10 touchdowns and totaled 1,159 receiving yards in first two seasons in the NFL. Won Super Bowl XLIV with the New Orleans Saints.
	Vince Young, QB, Texas Longhorns	Led Texas to NCAA Championship in 2006 Rose Bowl; NFL Offensive Rookie of the Year
	Michelle Wie, Professional Golfer	Youngest person to qualify for PGA or LPGA event, although went through early struggles as a professional. Reestablished herself with a strong individual performance at the 2009 Solheim Cup and her first LPGA tour win later that season.
	U.S. Men's Soccer Team	Failed to advance to the round of 16 at the 2006 World Cup after losing to Ghana.
2007	Dwight Howard	Nominees: José Reyes (SS, New York Mets), Juan Pablo Montoya (NASCAR driver), Calvin Johnson (WR, Detroit Lions)
2008	Joba Chamberlain	Nominees: Noel Devine (RB, West Virginia Mountaineers), Brandon Roy (SG, Portland Trail Blazers), Patrick Willis (LB, San Francisco 49ers), Tyson Gay
2009	Matt Ryan	Nominees: David Price (LHP, Tampa Bay Rays), Ricky Rubio (PG, DKV Joventut (Spain)), Joey Logano (Driver, NASCAR)

Winners After 2009

2010 Kevin Durant

2011 Buster Posey

2012 Cam Newton

2013 Kyrie Irving
