= ESPN Deportes La Revista =

Spanish-language American sports magazine

ESPN Deportes La Revista logo

ESPN Deportes La Revista (ISSN 1933-947X) is a Spanish-language magazine that focuses on sports from an Hispanic perspective. La Revista translates to "the Magazine", and ESPN Deportes (meaning "ESPN Sports") is the name of a Spanish-language television channel. Just as ESPN Deportes is meant as the Spanish-language version of ESPN, ESPN Deportes La Revista serves as the Spanish-language equivalent of ESPN The Magazine, although it produces original content and covers events throughout the world.

ESPN Deportes La Revista was first published in August 2005. The magazine is published by GW Publishing US LLC with offices in Miami, Puerto Rico and Mexico City.

== Personnel ==
Federico Flores Navarro is the CEO, Andoni Biurrarena is the editorial director, Jaime Olive is publisher (Mexico), Evaristo Lara is editor-in-chief, Betsie Batista is the advertising sales director, Brenda M. Tabraue-Perez is the circulation and consumer marketing manager, Juan David Cabassa is the Puerto Rico sales representative, José del Valle is staff writer, Mario Chavez Garcia is copy editor, Rodrigo Galindo is art manager, Tom DiPace is staff photographer, David Panagua is photography director, and Alberto Serralde is lead designer.
