= Odds compiler =

Employee of a bookmaker or betting exchange who sets odds

An odds compiler (or trader) is a person employed by a bookmaker or betting exchange who sets the odds for events (such as sporting outcomes) for customers to place bets on. Apart from pricing markets, they also engage in any activity regarding the trading aspects of gambling, such as monitoring customer accounts and the profitability of their operations.

The odds are derived from a variety of factors through analysis of information. Certain markets are highly statistical, whereas other markets require more intuition and insight. An odds compiler may be required to monitor the financial position the bookmaker is in and adjust their position (and odds) accordingly. They may also be consulted whether to accept a bet or not, usually in the case where a very large bet is being placed, to not incur dangerously high liabilities. Odds are usually not set completely independent of other bookmakers, but are influenced by what others are quoting. This is particularly important when the overround is below 100% and hence arbitrage betting, where betters can make a profit regardless of the outcome, is possible (see mathematics of bookmaking). In this case, the bookmaker with the most aberrant odds would usually alter their odds closer to other bookmakers' prices. The odds are influenced by betting volume so that a selection receiving a high volume of liquidity may have the odds for it cut.

In 2006, there were news reports that the only female odds compiler in the United Kingdom was a woman called Helen Jacob of Sky Bet.
