= ESPN The Magazine =

Monthly sports magazine

- Editor In Chief: Alison Overholt
- Categories: Sports
- Frequency: Monthly
- Total circulation: 2,144,483 (June 2018)
- First issue: November 3, 1998
- Final issue: September 2019
- Company: ESPN Inc. (The Walt Disney Company/Hearst Communications)
- Country: United States
- Based in: Bristol, Connecticut
- Language: English
- Website: http://insider.espn.com/insider/espn-the-magazine/
- ISSN: 1097-1998

ESPN The Magazine was an American monthly sports magazine published by the ESPN sports network in Bristol, Connecticut. The first issue, with the cover line "NEXT.," was published on March 11, 1998 (cover date March 23, 1998), and featured Kobe Bryant of the NBA, MLB's Alex Rodriguez, Kordell Stewart of the NFL, and Eric Lindros of the NHL. Initially published every other week, it scaled back to 24 issues a year in early 2016, then became a monthly in its later days.

The main sports covered include Major League Baseball, National Basketball Association, National Football League, National Hockey League, college basketball, and college football. The magazine typically took a more lighthearted and humorous approach to sporting news compared with competitors such as Sports Illustrated and, previously, the Sporting News.

On April 30, 2019, ESPN announced that it would cease paper publishing in September of that year. A multiplatform monthly story called ESPN Cover Story was launched to continue the magazine's legacy featuring a digital poster-style cover and profile in cover story fashion, including the continuation of NEXT Athlete proclamations and The Body Issue, but these two features did not return.

== Departments ==
Some of the regular departments, in their magazine order:

- Two Way: Stuart Scott answered questions from readers, giving his own opinions.
- The Biz: Peter Keating writes about the business side of sports and its effect on the sporting world.
- The Post: Looking back at the previous edition of the magazine with some of the readers' comments and updates on past stories.
- Zoom: One large "image of the week," occupying two pages.
- The Jump: A mix of different regular features, offering an alternative and usually humorous take on the current sporting scene.
- Outtakes: A transcript of an interview from The Dan Patrick Show with a sport star mostly talking about non sports issues. Kenny Mayne succeeded Patrick in this regular feature.
- The Life of Reilly: Former Sports Illustrated columnist Rick Reilly gives his opinions on the sports world, and reports upon various "special interest" stories in sports.
- NEXT Athlete: Yearly award given out to young rising star athletes.
- Athlete X: a feature that ran in the late 2000s where an anonymous athlete from various sports (MLB, NFL, and NASCAR) offered an insider's perspective.

Most of these departments and features were dropped after a 2011 editorial change. By 2016, only Zoom and The Biz still appeared regularly. There is also a recurring column that focuses on Sabermetrics, as well as The Truth, a back-page editorial that focuses on controversial topics. The Big Ticket, similar to The Jump, was introduced when ESPN The Magazine became a monthly in Fall 2018.

== The Body Issue ==
The annual "Body Issue", which debuted in 2009, was seen by some as a response to the Sports Illustrated Swimsuit Issue, and featured naked and scantily-clad athletes. The "Body Issue" addressed the physical structure of the most popular athletes to show what parts of their body they saw as almost "perfect". Gary Belsky, ESPN The Magazine's editor in chief at the time, described the "Body Issue" in terms that suggested it was a celebration and exploration of the athletic form.

== See also ==
- ESPN Deportes La Revista, a Spanish-language magazine
