= 2007 Oklahoma Sooners football team =

American college football season

2007 Oklahoma Sooners football

Big 12 champion Big 12 South Division champion

Big 12 Championship Game, W 38–17 vs. Missouri

Fiesta Bowl, L 28–48 vs. West Virginia
- Conference: Big 12 Conference
- South

Ranking
- Coaches: No. 8
- AP: No. 8
- Record: 11–3 (6–2 Big 12)
- Head coach: Bob Stoops (9th season)
- Offensive coordinator: Kevin Wilson (6th season)
- Offensive scheme: Spread
- Defensive coordinator: Brent Venables (9th season)
- Base defense: 4–3
- Captains: Lewis Baker; Joe Jon Finley; Jacob Gutierrez; Allen Patrick; Marcus Walker
- Home stadium: Gaylord Family Oklahoma Memorial Stadium (Capacity: 82,112)

2007 Big 12 Conference football standings
	Conf.			Overall
Team	W		L	W		L
North Division
No. 4 Missouri xy	7	–	1	12	–	2
No. 7 Kansas x%	7	–	1	12	–	1
Colorado	4	–	4	6	–	7
Kansas State	3	–	5	5	–	7
Nebraska	2	–	6	5	–	7
Iowa State	2	–	6	3	–	9
South Division
No. 8 Oklahoma xy$	6	–	2	11	–	3
No. 10 Texas	5	–	3	10	–	3
No. 22 Texas Tech	4	–	4	9	–	4
Oklahoma State	4	–	4	7	–	6
Texas A&M	4	–	4	7	–	6
Baylor	0	–	8	3	–	9
Championship: Oklahoma 38, Missouri 17
$ – BCS representative as conference champion; % – BCS at-large representative; x – Division champion/co-champions; y – Championship game participant; Rankings from AP Poll

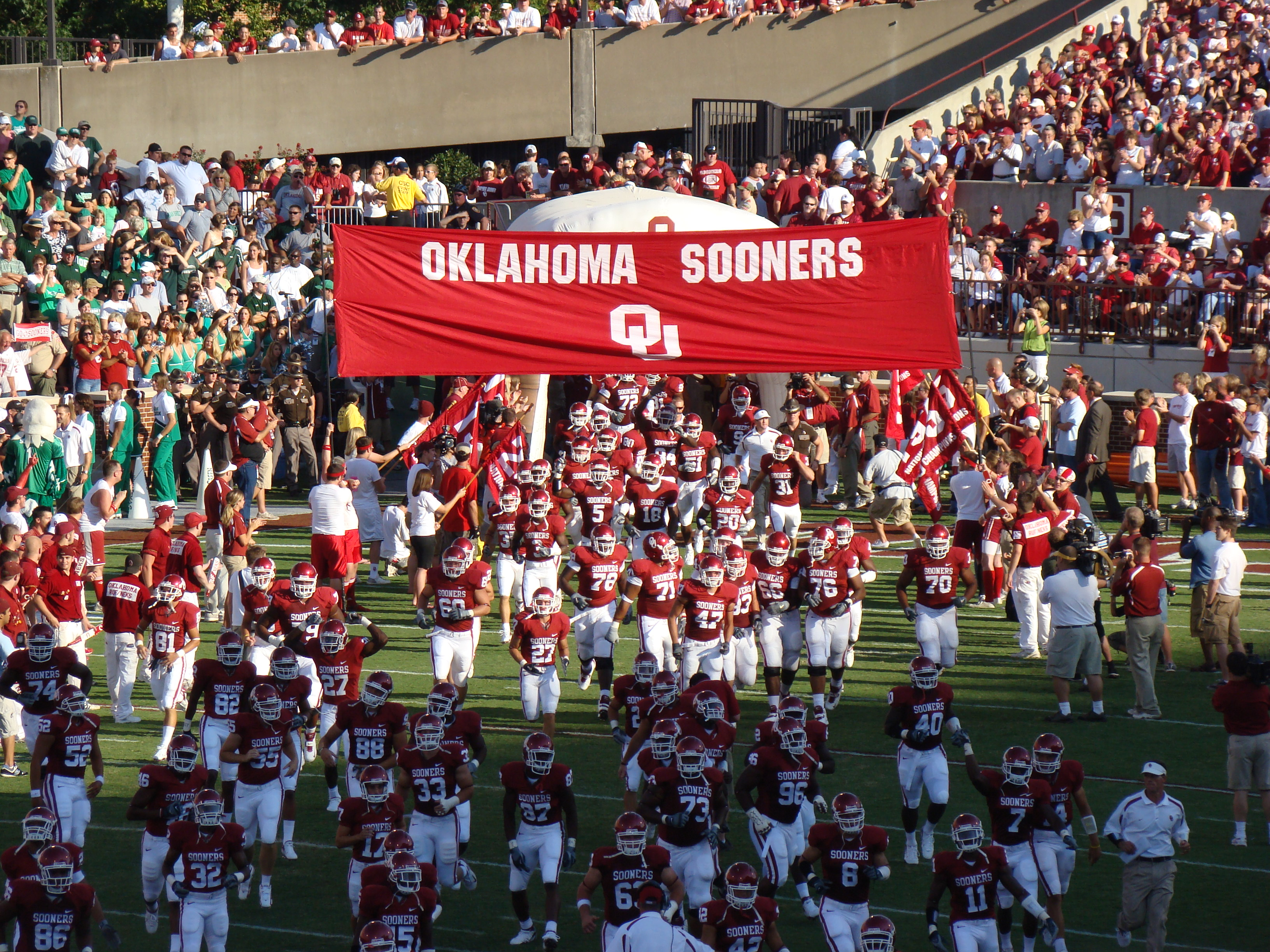
The Sooners run onto the field for the first game of the season against North Texas.

The 2007 Oklahoma Sooners football team represented the University of Oklahoma in the 2007 NCAA Division I FBS football season, the 113th season of Sooner football. The team was led by two-time Walter Camp Coach of the Year Award winner, Bob Stoops, in his ninth season as head coach. They played their homes games at Gaylord Family Oklahoma Memorial Stadium in Norman, Oklahoma. They were a charter member of the Big 12 Conference.

Conference play began with an upset loss to the Colorado Buffaloes in Boulder, Colorado, on September 29, and ended with a victory over the Missouri Tigers in the Big 12 Championship Game on December 1. The Sooners finished the regular season with an 11–2 record (6–2 in Big 12) while winning their fifth Big 12 title and their 41st conference title overall. They received an automatic berth to the Fiesta Bowl, where they lost to the West Virginia Mountaineers, 28–48.

Following the season, Malcolm Kelly and Curtis Lofton were drafted in the 2nd round of the 2008 NFL draft, Reggie Smith was selected in the 3rd, and Allen Patrick was chosen in the 7th.

== Preseason ==
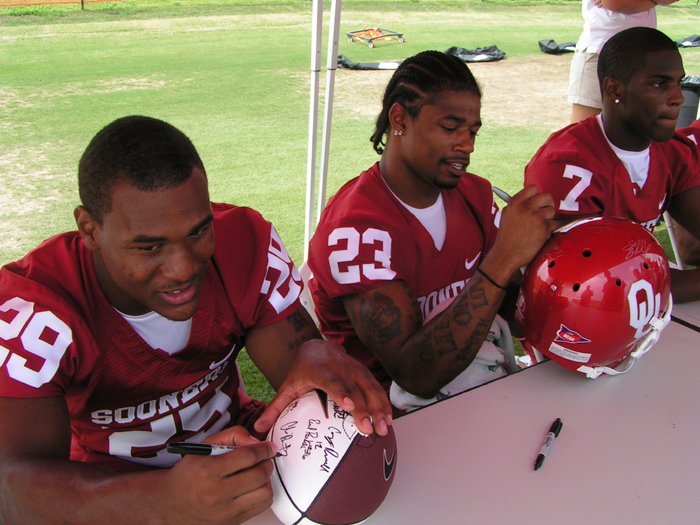
Chris Brown, Allen Patrick and DeMarco Murray sign autographs during Oklahoma's Fan Day on August 3rd, 2007.

On July 19, a preseason poll voted on by members of the media that cover the Big 12 was released. The Sooners were chosen to finish second in the Big 12 South behind Texas. They finished nine votes behind the Longhorns but 44 points above Texas A&M, the third team. This poll was released in anticipation of the Big 12 media day which began on July 23, 2007. Most publications had the Sooners ranked between five and ten in the preseason. Phil Steele's self-titled publication, which is considered by many to be the most accurate college football preseason prediction magazine, had the Sooners ranked number three in terms of how they would finish the year and how strong the team is going into the year. On August 2, 2007, Coach Bob Stoops announced at a rally that the names of players would be put back on the team's jerseys. They had been removed in a re-design before the 2006 season.

The 2006 season was the last for quarterback Paul Thompson. With his departure came the race for the next quarterback of the Oklahoma Sooners. The three players in contention for the coveted spot included true freshman Keith Nichol, redshirt freshman Sam Bradford and junior Joey Halzle (the only one of the three with actual game experience). They competed throughout the summer and well into fall practice. On August 21, 2007, it was announced that Bradford would start the first game of the season.

=== NCAA violations ===
In 2006, the team and the fanbase were stunned when the returning starting quarterback, Rhett Bomar, was kicked off the team one day before the start of fall practice. Quarterback-turned-wide receiver Paul Thompson was converted back to quarterback and led the Sooners to an 11–3 season capturing the Big 12 Championship and competing in a BCS bowl game. However, the fallout of the Bomar scandal began to affect the team in 2007. On July 11, 2007, the NCAA announced a finding of "failure to monitor" the employment of student athletes and handed out penalties, most of which were extensions of punishments already set in place by the university.

- Probation until May 2010
- The loss of two scholarships through the 2009–10 season
- A reduction by one of the number of coaches who can recruit off campus
- A public reprimand and censure
- A disassociation with the dealership manager for five years
- All wins from the 2005 season were vacated, changing the team's record from 8–4 to 0–4 for that year

The university announced that it would appeal the Infraction Committee's finding and the vacation of the wins from the 2005 season. University president David Boren released a statement that the university "[does] not believe that erasing the 2005 season from the record books is fair to the over 100 student-athletes and coaches who played by the rules and worked their hearts out for a successful season." The Sooners won the appeal to get back their wins from the 2005 season.

=== Recruits ===
National Signing Day was on February 7, 2007, and Oklahoma was set to sign many talented high school athletes from around the country. It ended up being a smaller class than usual due to the loss of only a few seniors. In addition to the seniors leaving, running back Adrian Peterson left early for the NFL draft and three other players were set to be on medical redshirt for the upcoming season. There was some separation in Oklahoma's recruiting ranking by the two major recruiting websites. Scout.com ranked the Oklahoma recruiting class as the 30th best in the nation, while Rivals.com ranked Oklahoma as the 14th best. In the pre-season, incoming quarterback Keith Nichol was named one of the top-10 impact freshman for 2007. Below is a list of the recruits that signed their letter of intent.

College recruiting (2007)
Name	Hometown	School	Height	Weight	40^{‡}	Commit date
Frank Alexander; TE	New Orleans, Louisiana	Southern University Lab School	6 ft 3.4 in (1.92 m)	234 lb (106 kg)	4.75	Feb 7, 2007
Frank Alexander; TE	Recruit ratings: Scout: Rivals: (77)					
David Anderson; DE	Lawton, Oklahoma	MacArthur HS	6 ft 5 in (1.96 m)	220 lb (100 kg)	–	Jan 29, 2007
David Anderson; DE	Recruit ratings: Scout: Rivals: (40)					
Austin Box; LB	Enid, Oklahoma	Enid HS	6 ft 3 in (1.91 m)	215 lb (98 kg)	4.6	Mar 31, 2006
Austin Box; LB	Recruit ratings: Scout: Rivals: (82)					
Ryan Broyles; WR	Norman, Oklahoma	Norman HS	5 ft 11.5 in (1.82 m)	170 lb (77 kg)	4.51	Feb 7, 2007
Ryan Broyles; WR	Recruit ratings: Scout: Rivals: (77)					
Jonte Bumpus; DE	Muskogee, Oklahoma	Muskogee HS	6 ft 4 in (1.93 m)	223 lb (101 kg)	–	Apr 20, 2006
Jonte Bumpus; DE	Recruit ratings: Scout: Rivals: (74)					
Kody Cooke; OG	Enid, Oklahoma	Enid HS	6 ft 4 in (1.93 m)	292 lb (132 kg)	–	Aug 30, 2006
Kody Cooke; OG	Recruit ratings: Scout: Rivals: (72)					
Jamell Fleming; CB	Arlington, Texas	Seguin HS	5 ft 10.5 in (1.79 m)	187 lb (85 kg)	4.56	Jun 1, 2005
Jamell Fleming; CB	Recruit ratings: Scout: Rivals: (77)					
Jason Hannan; C	Waxahachie, Texas	Waxahachie HS	6 ft 3.5 in (1.92 m)	274 lb (124 kg)	5.39	Oct 28, 2006
Jason Hannan; C	Recruit ratings: Scout: Rivals: (77)					
Desmond Jackson; S	Seguin, Texas	Seguin HS	5 ft 11 in (1.80 m)	187 lb (85 kg)	4.50	Jun 8, 2006
Desmond Jackson; S	Recruit ratings: Scout: Rivals: (79)					
Travis Lewis; MLB	San Antonio, Texas	Lee HS	6 ft 1.5 in (1.87 m)	217 lb (98 kg)	4.4	Feb 6, 2007
Travis Lewis; MLB	Recruit ratings: Scout: Rivals: (75)					
Phil Loadholt; OT	Garden City, Kansas	Garden City CC	6 ft 9 in (2.06 m)	360 lb (160 kg)	5.3	Aug 1, 2006
Phil Loadholt; OT	Recruit ratings: Scout: Rivals:					
Keith Nichol; QB	Lowell, Michigan	Lowell Senior HS	6 ft 2 in (1.88 m)	188 lb (85 kg)	4.69	Nov 30, 2006
Keith Nichol; QB	Recruit ratings: Scout: Rivals: (78)					
Sam Proctor; RB/ATH	Pearland, Texas	Pearland HS	6 ft 0.5 in (1.84 m)	201 lb (91 kg)	4.55	Jan 29, 2007
Sam Proctor; RB/ATH	Recruit ratings: Scout: Rivals: (75)					
Mike Reed; MLB	Marysville, California	Yuba CC	6 ft 3.5 in (1.92 m)	248 lb (112 kg)	4.5	Mar 29, 2006
Mike Reed; MLB	Recruit ratings: Scout: Rivals:					
Donald Stephenson; C	Blue Springs, Missouri	Blue Springs HS	6 ft 5 in (1.96 m)	279 lb (127 kg)	5.00	Jan 25, 2007
Donald Stephenson; C	Recruit ratings: Scout: Rivals: (76)					
Jimmy Stevens; K	Oklahoma City, Oklahoma	Heritage Hall Schools	5 ft 6 in (1.68 m)	170 lb (77 kg)	–	Aug 25, 2006
Jimmy Stevens; K	Recruit ratings: Scout: Rivals: (40)					
Tyler Stradford; WR	New Orleans, Louisiana	O. Perry Walker School	6 ft 2.5 in (1.89 m)	178 lb (81 kg)	4.41	Jan 30, 2007
Tyler Stradford; WR	Recruit ratings: Scout: Rivals: (75)					
Londell Taylor; S	Vian, Oklahoma	Vian HS	6 ft 2.5 in (1.89 m)	214 lb (97 kg)	–	Feb 5, 2007
Londell Taylor; S	Recruit ratings: Scout: Rivals: (71)					
Alex Williams; OT	New Orleans, Louisiana	O. Perry Walker School	6 ft 5 in (1.96 m)	294 lb (133 kg)	5.20	Feb 2, 2007
Alex Williams; OT	Recruit ratings: Scout: Rivals: (74)					
Corey Wilson; WR	Carrollton, Texas	Creekview HS	6 ft 0 in (1.83 m)	185 lb (84 kg)	4.47	Sep 24, 2006
Corey Wilson; WR	Recruit ratings: Scout: Rivals: (77)					
Overall recruit ranking: Scout: 30 Rivals: 14
‡ Refers to 40-yard dash; Note: In many cases, Scout, Rivals, 247Sports, On3, and ESPN may conflict in their listings of height, weight and 40 time.; In these cases, the average was taken. ESPN grades are on a 100-point scale.; Sources: "Oklahoma 2007 Football Commitments". Rivals.; "2007 Oklahoma Commits". Scout.; "2007 Player Commitments – Oklahoma". ESPN.; "Scout.com Team Recruiting Rankings". Scout.; "2007 Team Ranking". Rivals.com.

=== Award watch lists and finalists ===
On July 13, 2007, the Charlotte Touchdown Club released their watch list for the Bronko Nagurski Trophy. Sooner defensive back Reggie Smith was among the 50 players listed. In the previous season, Smith had 40 tackles and three interceptions as a defensive back, and was also the main return specialist for the team, returning an interception and a punt for touchdowns.

On August 28, 2007, the Palm Beach County Sports Commission released their watch list for the Lou Groza Award, awarded to the most outstanding place kicker. On the list was Oklahoma's Garrett Hartley. Hartley was a finalist for the award in 2006 after making nineteen of twenty field goals and going 49 of 50 on extra points. Tight end Brody Eldridge made the Mackey Award watchlist, safety Nic Harris was on the Jim Thorpe Award watchlist, and Malcolm Kelly and Allen Patrick were both on the Maxwell Award watchlist.

In the middle of the season, several more Sooners were added to various watchlists. Redshirt freshman quarterback Sam Bradford was added to the watchlist for the Maxwell Award, awarded to the nation's best player. Oklahoma has had two prior winners of this prestigious award, including Tommy McDonald and Jason White. Auston English was added to the watchlist for the Ted Hendricks Award, given to the nation's best defensive end. The Sooners had not yet had a winner of this award in its five-year history. Punter Michael Cohen was also receiving recognition, as he was added to the watchlist for the Ray Guy Award. Again, no Sooner had ever won this award, though Jeff Ferguson was a finalist in 2001.

== Schedule ==
Date	Time	Opponent	Rank	Site	TV	Result	Attendance
September 1	6:00 p.m.	North Texas*	No. 8	Oklahoma Memorial Stadium; Norman, OK	FSN	W 79–10	84,472
September 8	11:00 a.m.	Miami (FL)*	No. 5	Oklahoma Memorial Stadium; Norman, OK	ABC	W 51–13	85,357
September 15	2:30 p.m.	Utah State*	No. 3	Oklahoma Memorial Stadium; Norman, OK	PPV	W 54–3	84,403
September 21	7:00 p.m.	at Tulsa*	No. 4	Skelly Stadium; Tulsa, OK	ESPN2	W 62–21	35,542
September 29	12:30 p.m.	at Colorado	No. 3	Folsom Field; Boulder, CO	FSN	L 24–27	50,031
October 6	2:30 p.m.	vs. No. 19 Texas	No. 10	Cotton Bowl; Dallas, TX (Red River Rivalry)	ABC	W 28–21	80,000
October 13	5:30 p.m.	No. 11 Missouri^{†}	No. 6	Oklahoma Memorial Stadium; Norman, OK (rivalry) (College GameDay)	FSN	W 41–31	85,041
October 20	11:30 a.m.	at Iowa State	No. 4	Jack Trice Stadium; Ames, IA	FSN	W 17–7	49,511
November 3	7:00 p.m.	Texas A&M	No. 5	Oklahoma Memorial Stadium; Norman, OK	ABC	W 42–14	85,044
November 10	5:30 p.m.	Baylor	No. 4	Oklahoma Memorial Stadium; Norman, OK	FSN	W 52–21	84,450
November 17	7:00 p.m.	at Texas Tech	No. 3	Jones AT&T Stadium; Lubbock, TX	ABC	L 27–34	55,038
November 24	2:30 p.m.	Oklahoma State	No. 10	Oklahoma Memorial Stadium; Norman, OK (Bedlam Series)	FSN	W 49–17	85,238
December 1	7:00 p.m.	vs. No. 1 Missouri	No. 9	Alamodome; San Antonio, TX (Big 12 Championship Game / rivalry) (College GameDay)	ABC	W 38–17	62,585
January 2, 2008	7:00 p.m.	vs. No. 11 West Virginia*	No. 3	University of Phoenix Stadium; Glendale, AZ (Fiesta Bowl)	FOX	L 28–48	70,016
*Non-conference game; ^{†}Homecoming; Rankings from AP Poll released prior to the game; All times are in Central time

== Roster ==
The 2007 Oklahoma Sooners football team consisted of 110 total players. There were eight returning offensive starters and seven returning defensive starters from the 2006 team. Overall, 50 lettermen were returning from the 2006 team (25 on offense, 20 on defense and 5 on special teams). The 2007 team captains were Joe Jon Finley, Allen Patrick, Lewis Baker, Marcus Walker and Jacob Gutierrez. Finley and Patrick represented the offense, Baker and Walker represented the defense and Gutierrez represented the special teams.

(as of September 6, 2007)
Quarterbacks: 5 John Nimmo – (redshirt) Freshman; 6 Keith Nichol – Freshman; 14 Sam Bradford – (redshirt) Freshman; 15 Joey Halzle – Junior; Running backs: 7 DeMarco Murray – (redshirt) Freshman; 17 Mossis Madu – (redshirt) Freshman; 21 Jacob Gutierrez – Senior; 23 Allen Patrick – Senior; 29 Chris Brown – Sophomore; 36 Earl Parker – Freshman; 41 Derek Gove – (redshirt) Freshman; Offensive line: 50 Jon Cooper – Junior; 54 Jason Hannan – Freshman; 63 Noah Hughey – Sophomore; 64 Kody Cooke – Freshman; 65 Brandon Nofire – Sophomore; 66 Donald Stephenson – Freshman; 70 Cory Brandon – (redshirt) Freshman; 71 Trent Williams – Sophomore; 72 Duke Robinson – Junior; 73 Brandon Walker – Junior; 74 Brian Simmons – Sophomore; 75 Chase Beeler – Sophomore; 76 Branndon Braxton – Junior; 77 Sherrone Moore – Senior; 78 Alex Williams – Freshman; 79 Phil Loadholt – Junior; Tight ends: 18 Jermaine Gresham – Sophomore; 19 Joe Jon Finley – Senior; 47 Trent Ratterree – Freshman; 83 Brody Eldridge – Sophomore; 86 Ryan Allgood – (redshirt) Freshman; 88 Eric Mensik – (redshirt) Freshman; 89 Kolby Smith – Junior; Fullbacks: 34 Matt Clapp – Junior; 38 Aaron Hayes – Freshman; 40 Buck Buchanan – Freshman; 45 Dane Zaslaw – Senior; 49 Ian Pleasant – Senior; 47 David Jones - Senior	Wide receivers: 1 Manuel Johnson – Junior; 4 Malcolm Kelly – Junior; 8 Brandon Caleb – Sophomore; 9 Juaquin Iglesias – Junior; 11 Chase Wasson – Senior; 12 Corey Wilson – Freshman; 22 Russell English – Sophomore; 27 Garrett Bothun – Senior; 39 Collin Cox – Sophomore; 80 Adron Tennell – Sophomore; 81 Carter Whitson – Sophomore; 82 Tyler Stradford – Freshman; 84 Quentin Chaney – Junior; 85 Ryan Broyles – Freshman; Defensive line: 33 Auston English – Sophomore; 54 Tommy Taggart – Junior; 62 Tola Jimoh – Sophomore; 84 Frank Alexander – Freshman; 86 Adrian Taylor – (redshirt) Freshman; 87 David Anderson – Freshman; 89 Cordero Moore – Sophomore; 90 Steven Coleman – Senior; 91 Alonzo Dotson – Senior; 93 Gerald McCoy – (redshirt) Freshman; 94 Pryce Macon – (redshirt) Freshman; 95 Alan Davis – Junior; 96 DeMarcus Granger – Sophomore; 97 Cory Bennett – Junior; 98 John Williams – Senior; 99 Jonte Bumpus – Freshman; Linebackers: 8 Ryan Reynolds – Sophomore; 10 Mike Reed – Junior; 16 Lewis Baker – Senior; 28 Travis Lewis – Freshman; 30 Lamont Robinson – Sophomore; 40 Curtis Lofton – Junior; 42 Austin Box – Freshman; 44 Jeremy Beal – (redshirt) Freshman; 46 T.C. Bread – Freshman; 48 Brandon Crow – (redshirt) Freshman; 51 Demarrio Pleasant – Senior; 53 Brandon Morris – Freshman; 57 Brock Hesse – Sophomore	Defensive backs: 2 Brian Jackson – Sophomore; 3 Reggie Smith – Junior; 4 Jonathan Nelson – (redshirt) Freshman; 5 Nic Harris – Junior; 6 Desmond Jackson – Freshman; 11 Lendy Holmes – Junior; 12 Sean Edwards – Freshman; 13 Michael Hayes – (redshirt) Freshman; 14 Arthur Thomas – Freshman; 15 Dominique Franks – (redshirt) Freshman; 18 Cortney Carter – Junior; 20 Quinton Carter – (redshirt) Sophomore; 22 Keenan Clayton – Sophomore; 24 Marcus Walker – Senior; 25 D.J. Wolfe – Senior; 26 Brett Bowers – Junior; 27 Sam Proctor – Freshman; 32 Jamell Fleming – Freshman; 41 Darrien Williams – Senior; Punters: 13 Mike Knall – Junior; 31 Michael Cohen – Senior; Kickers: 10 Garrett Hartley – Senior; 17 Jimmy Stevens – Freshman; 37 Matthew Moreland – Freshman; 43 Spencer Covey – Freshman; Deep Snapper: 52 Derek Shaw – Sophomore; 55 Kyle Johnson – Junior; 56 Jarred Kopepasah – Freshman

== Coaching staff ==
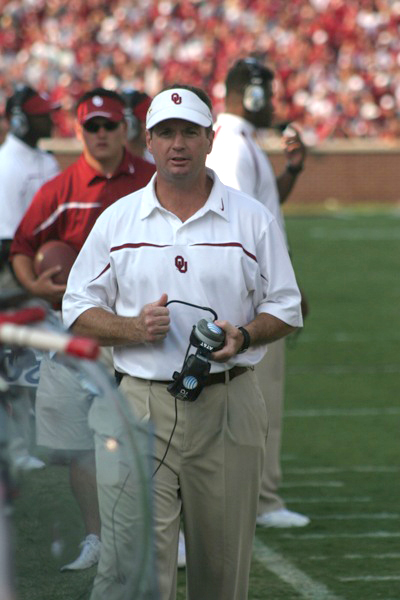
Bob Stoops, head coach of Oklahoma.

Compared to the previous year, the 2007 season saw no changes in the coaching staff. However, like the season before, Bob Stoops's name was mentioned as a possibility for some coaching vacancies, but he made it known he was committed to Oklahoma.

Name	Position	Years at OU
Bob Stoops	Head coach	9
Brent Venables	Associate head coach Defensive coordinator Linebackers	9
Bobby Jack Wright	Assistant head coach Co-defensive coordinator Defensive backs	9
Kevin Wilson	Offensive coordinator Tight ends/fullbacks	6
Cale Gundy	Recruiting coordinator Running backs	9
Kevin Sumlin	Co-offensive coordinator Receivers	6
Josh Heupel	Quarterbacks	4
James Patton	Offensive line	2
Jackie Shipp	Defensive line	9
Chris Wilson	Defensive ends	3

== Game summaries ==
=== North Texas ===
North Texas Mean Green at #8 Oklahoma Sooners

Team	1	2	3	4	Total
North Texas	0	0	3	7	10
• #8 Oklahoma	21	28	14	16	79

- Date: September 1
- Location: Gaylord Family Oklahoma Memorial Stadium, Norman, Oklahoma
- Game start: 6:00 p.m. CST
- Game attendance: 84,472
- TV announcers (FSN): Bill Land (play-by-play), Dave Lapham (color) and Jim Knox (sideline)

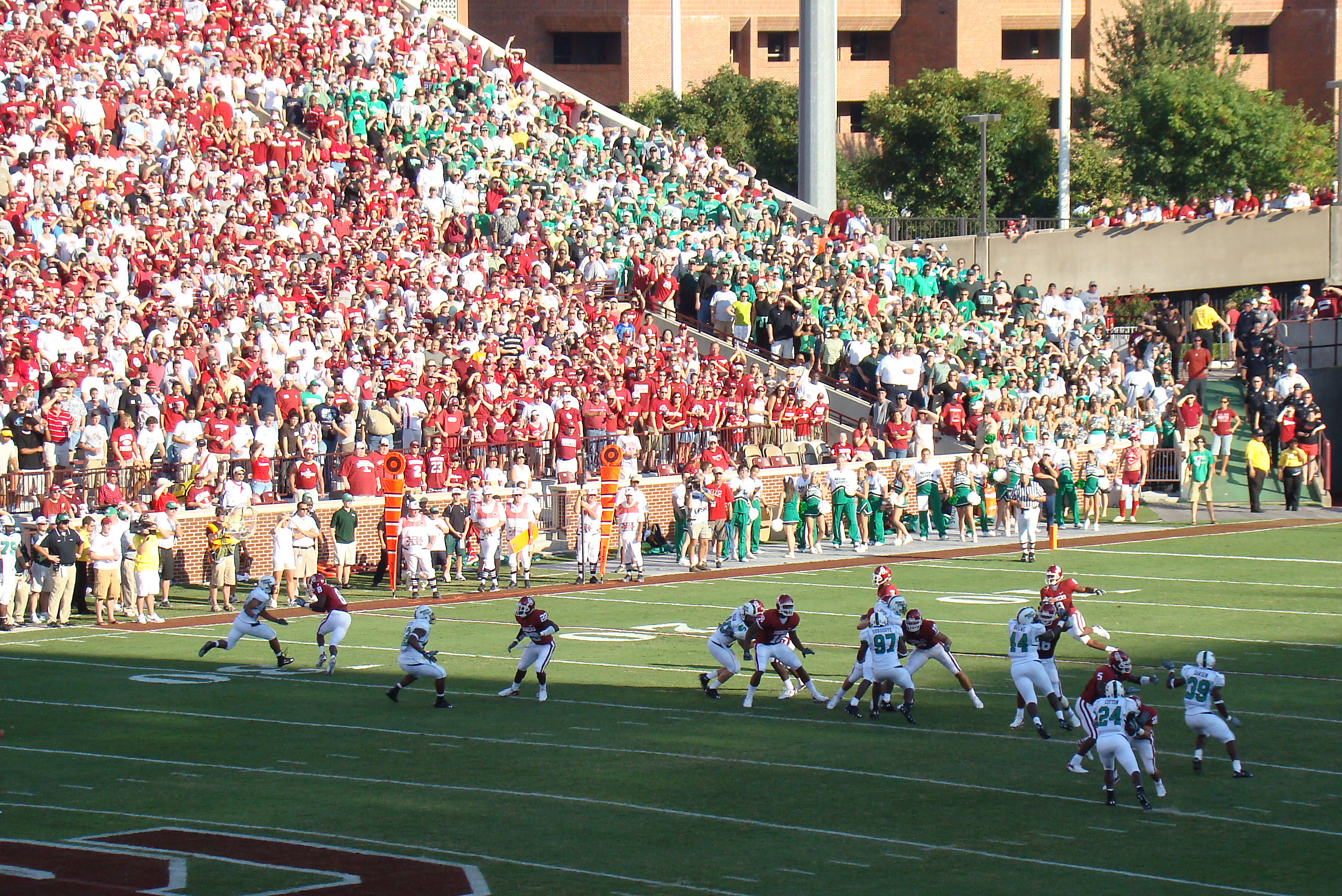
The Sooner offense on the field with both Sooner and Mean Green fans looking on

The Sooners opened the season at home against the North Texas Mean Green coached by Todd Dodge. Going into the game, Oklahoma was 8–1 in home openers under Bob Stoops. The last time Oklahoma played North Texas was in 2003, when the Sooners held the Mean Green to 154 yards of total offense in a 37–3 win. At the time, North Texas was affiliated with the Sun Belt Conference in the NCAA Division I FBS. The Sooners were favored to win by a wide margin with most estimates between 38 and 41 points. The official attendance for the game was 84,472, the 50th consecutive sellout and the largest crowd ever to see an opener at Gaylord Family Oklahoma Memorial Stadium.

Oklahoma scored on their first possession only 32 seconds into the game. By halftime, the Sooners had exceeded the point spread and were up 49–0. Two redshirt freshmen were the stars of the day. Sam Bradford, making his first start as the new quarterback, threw for 350 yards in the first half, the most yards thrown in a half by any Oklahoma quarterback in history. He came out of the game early in the third quarter after throwing for a total of 363 yards, the most ever for a Sooner in his debut game. During this time, he tied Heisman Trophy winner Jason White's record of 18 consecutive pass completions. He finished the day with 23 pass attempts and 21 completions and a passing efficiency rating of 266.92, the second highest ever for a Sooner (behind Jason White). Head coach Bob Stoops felt Bradford "threw the ball fantastic, from the deep balls to some of those quick bubble screens that he put right on the money." DeMarco Murray, another redshirt freshman, also set a school record as he became the first Sooner to score four touchdowns in a half in his first game. He finished the day with five touchdowns.

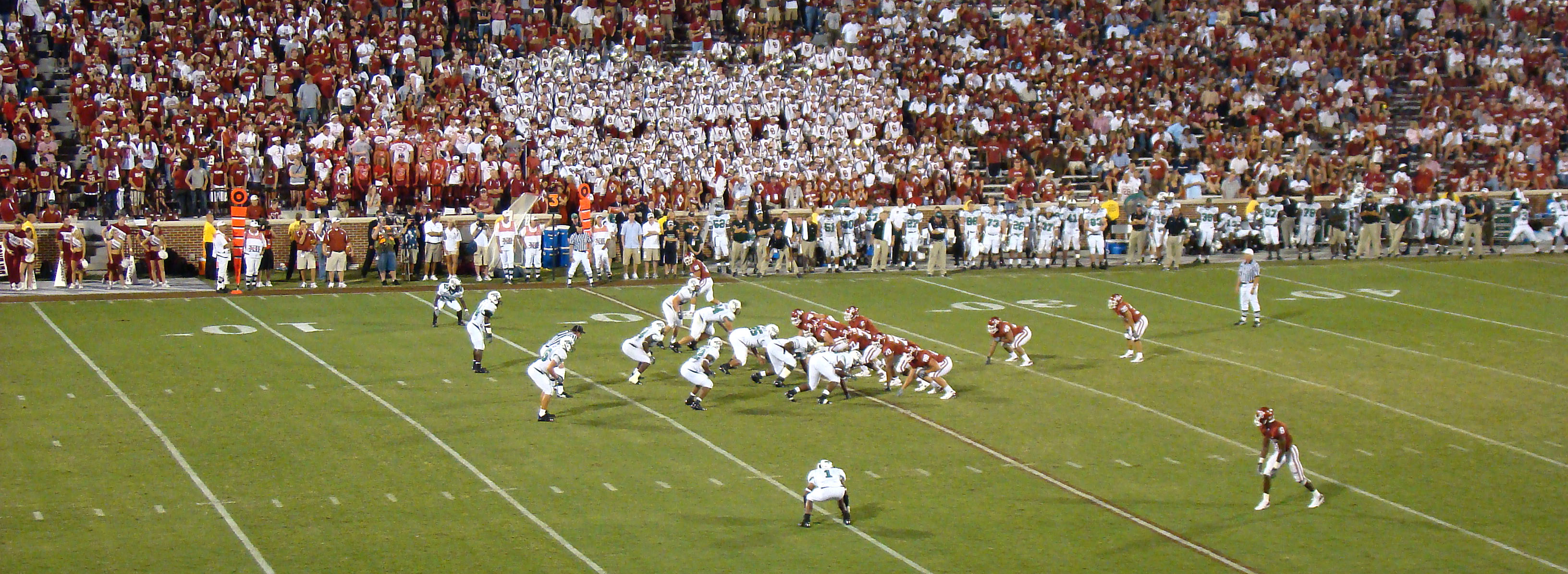
The Sooners line up for the next play with the Pride of Oklahoma Marching Band looking on.

The game ended with a final score of 79–10. North Texas's points came on a field goal in the third quarter and a 69-yard touchdown pass from quarterback Giovanni Vizza to Casey Fitzgerald at the beginning of the fourth quarter. The Mean Green finished with 15 yards rushing and 232 yards passing. All three of Oklahoma's quarterbacks saw gametime. Joey Halzle followed Bradford in the third quarter and completed four of his five pass attempts. Nichol finished the game, but did not attempt a pass. The Sooners had 668 yards of total offense against North Texas, the 11th-highest in school history to that point, and 403 passing yards, the fifth-highest in school history to that point. Oklahoma's 482 yards in the first half was the third highest for yardage in a half. Coach Stoops did admit being worried about running up the score. He said, "Well, we were telling our guys not to score, if they broke free we were telling them to take a knee or something. Their style of play didn’t really help either. They got on the line and snapped the ball with 20 or so seconds left on the play clock. I’m not criticizing, I’m just saying that the style of play doesn’t help either." Former Oklahoma coach Barry Switzer agreed: "They had no game plan for losing… Because when you can't win a game, you need to run the clock, don't let it stop, don't throw passes incomplete… get the game over with, get on the bus and go home." Stoops requested a running clock for the fourth quarter, but the request was not granted. North Texas's coach handled the loss well and held no ill-feelings towards to Sooners for the lopsided win. "When you play a great team like that, you always have the chances of obviously this happening," Dodge said. "Give credit where credit is due – a great Oklahoma football team. Um ... Wow! Very, very impressive."

=== Miami (FL) ===
Miami Hurricanes at #5 Oklahoma Sooners

Team	1	2	3	4	Total
Miami (FL)	3	7	3	0	13
• #5 Oklahoma	14	7	10	20	51

- Date: September 8
- Location: Gaylord Family Oklahoma Memorial Stadium, Norman, Oklahoma
- Game start: 11:00 a.m. CST
- Game attendance: 85,357
- TV announcers (ABC): Ron Franklin (Play-by-play), Ed Cunningham (Color) & Jimmy Dykes (Sideline)

Scoring summary
1	10:40	OU	Malcolm Kelly 23-yard pass from Sam Bradford (Garrett Hartley kick)	OU 7–0
1	5:26	MIA	Francisco Zampogna 20-yard field goal	OU 7–3
1	1:37	OU	Malcolm Kelly 24-yard pass from Sam Bradford (Garrett Hartley kick)	OU 14–3
2	12:29	OU	Reggie Smith 61-yard fumble return (Garrett Hartley kick)	OU 21–3
2	1:06	MIA	Ryan Hill 6-yard pass from Kyle Wright (Francisco Zampogna kick)	OU 21–10
3	10:37	MIA	Francisco Zampogna 45-yard field goal	OU 21–13
3	7:22	OU	Jermaine Gresham 6-yard pass from Sam Bradford (Garrett Hartley kick)	OU 28–13
3	0:36	OU	Garrett Hartley 30-yard field goal	OU 30–13
4	11:52	OU	Malcolm Kelly 30-yard pass from Sam Bradford (Garrett Hartley kick)	OU 37–13
4	7:41	OU	Dane Zaslaw 9-yard pass from Sam Bradford (kick failed)	OU 44–13
4	2:48	OU	Adrian Tennell 61-yard pass from Joey Halzle (Garrett Hartley kick)	OU 51–13

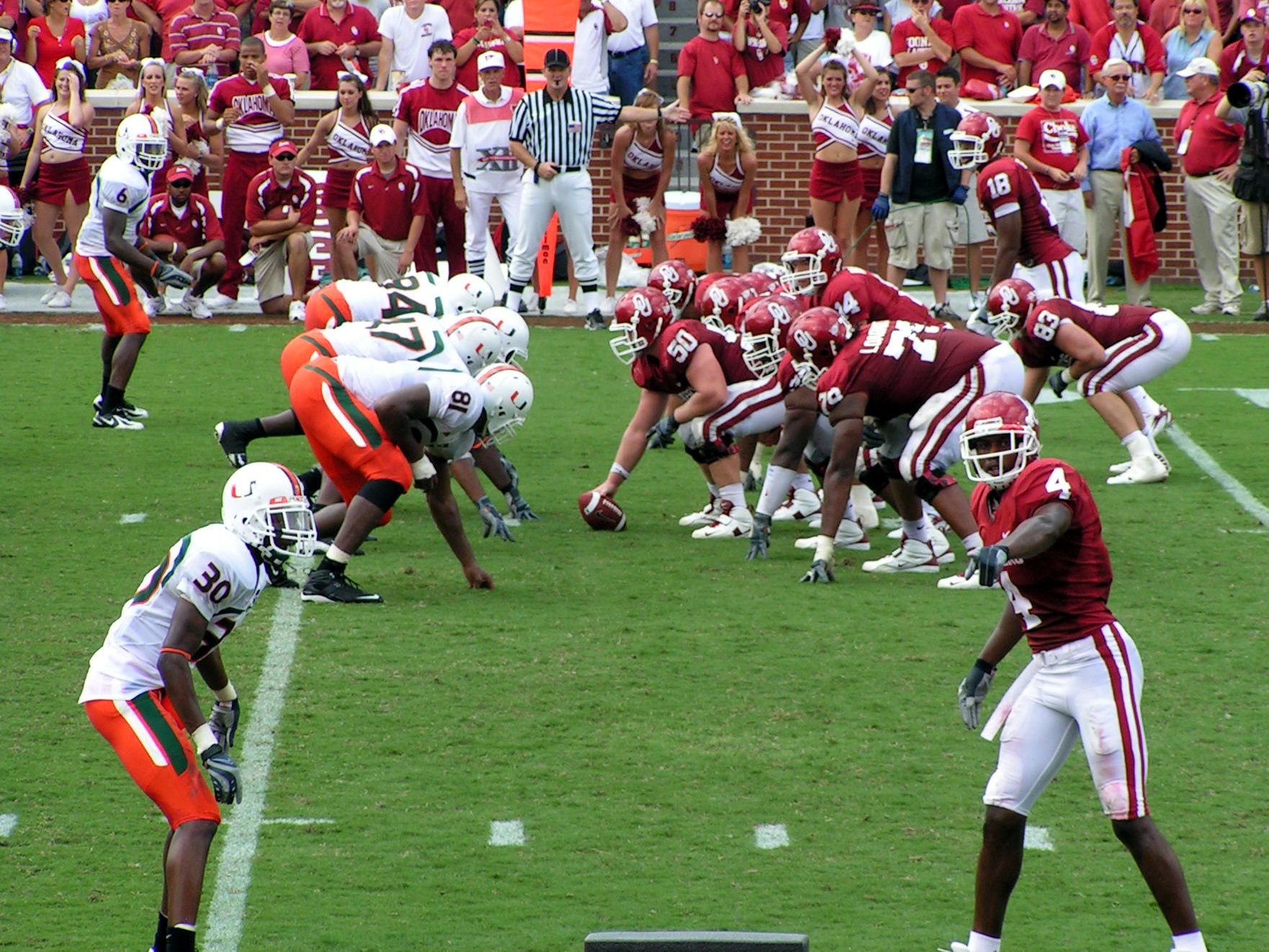
The Sooner offense lined up against the Hurricane defense.

Oklahoma and Miami had only met six times, including this year's matchup. Between 1985 and 1987, Oklahoma was 33–3 with all three losses coming to Jimmy Johnson's Miami teams. It began in 1985 when the unranked Miami squad came to Norman to take on Barry Switzer's No. 3 ranked Oklahoma team. The Sooners lost the game 14–27, they lost their starting quarterback Troy Aikman to a broken leg, and Miami was propelled to the national stage. The next two times the teams met, OU was ranked No. 1 and Miami #2. In 1987, the two teams met in the 1988 Orange Bowl. Again, the Sooners lost. The game is said to have featured more talent than any other game in college football history. In the 1988 NFL draft, thirteen Oklahoma players and twelve Miami players were drafted including four first rounders and four second rounders. The head coaches of both teams would both go on to coach the Dallas Cowboys and they both remain the only people to ever win a national championship in college football and the Super Bowl.

The Sooners, after moving up a couple spots in both polls, took on Randy Shannon's Miami team in front of a record-breaking 85,357 people at Oklahoma Memorial Stadium. The Sooners were favored to defeat the ACC team by 10 to 11 points. Sam Bradford followed his record-breaking debut with another, completing 19 of his 25 pass attempts for 205 yards and tying the school record for most touchdown passes in a game with five. In addition, he extended his record-tying streak of consecutive pass completions to claim the record for his own. Bradford finished his first game with 18-straight pass completions. He came into his second game with four more straight completions, breaking the old record. Through two games, Bradford had completed 83% of his passes, had as many touchdown passes as incompletions (eight), and was ranked number one in the country for passing efficiency. For his performance, he was named the Walter Camp National Player of the Week and the Big 12 Offensive Player of the Week.

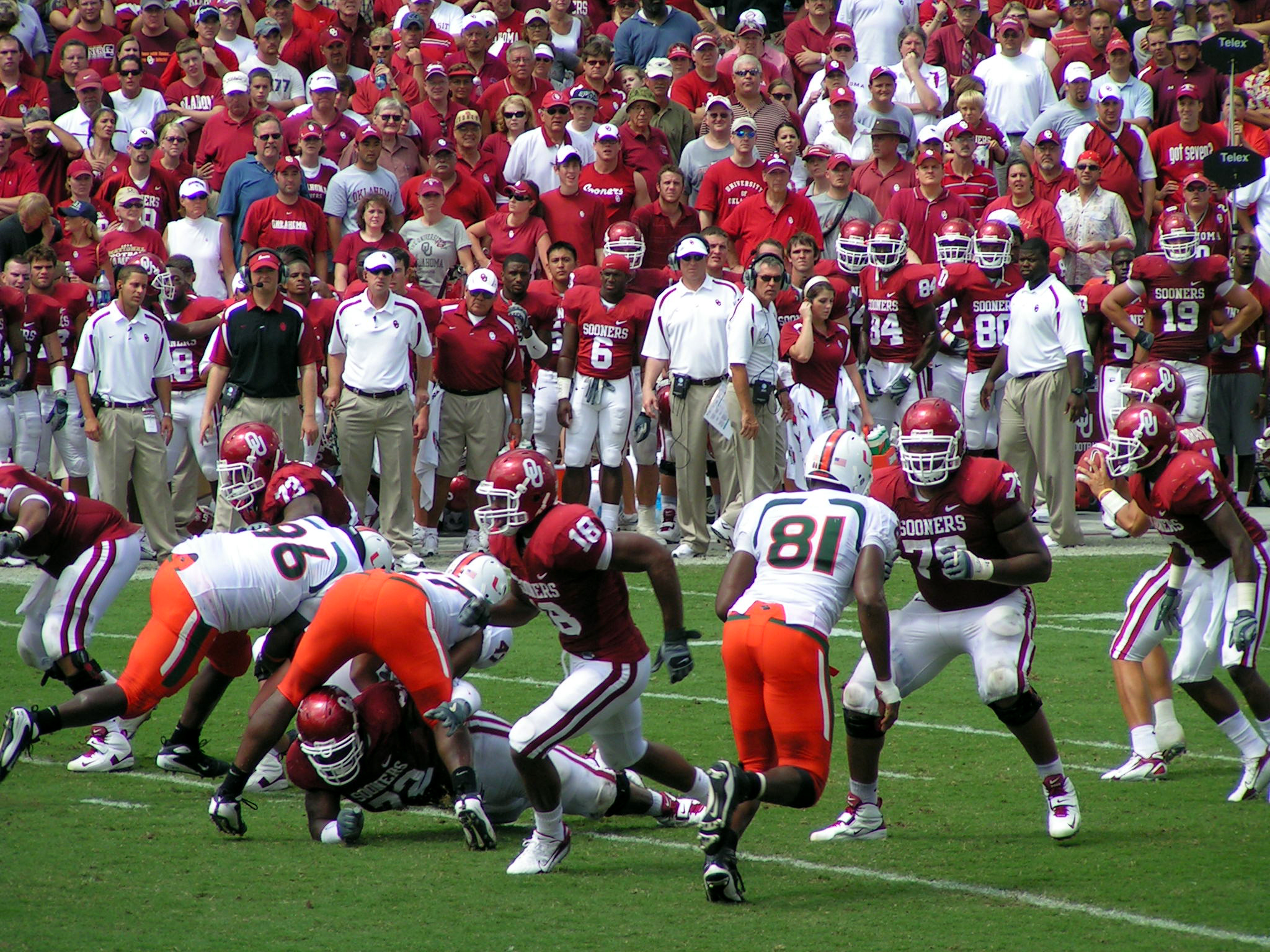
Several Sooners block Hurricane defenders to allow time for QB Sam Bradford to complete a pass.

Miami was able to keep the game close in the first half, going into halftime with the Sooners up 21–10. In the second quarter, Miami replaced their starting quarterback Kirby Freeman with backup Kyle Wright. Wright led the Hurricanes down the field to their only touchdown of the game. Wright was later pulled and Freeman went back into the game. Wright completed seven of his fourteen passes for 65 yards while Freeman completed three of his nine for seventeen yards. The Sooners pulled away in the second half. The 51 points Oklahoma scored against the Hurricanes was the most they had given up since 1998. Miami finished with 139 total yards, with 52 of them coming on their lone touchdown drive. Oklahoma cornerback Reggie Smith was named the Big 12 Defensive Player of the Week for his performance. The Sooners finished with 411 total yards with 295 yards coming through the air and 116 yards on the ground. However, because of a new NCAA rule, a bad snap to the punter which resulted in a loss of 42 yards came off the rushing total.

=== Utah State ===
Utah State Aggies at #3 Oklahoma Sooners

Team	1	2	3	4	Total
Utah State	0	3	0	0	3
• #3 Oklahoma	14	24	16	0	54

- Date: September 15
- Location: Gaylord Family Oklahoma Memorial Stadium, Norman, Oklahoma
- Game start: 2:30 p.m. CST
- Game attendance: 84,403
- TV announcers (FSN PPV): Bill Land (Play-by-play), Dean Blevins (Color) & Emily Jones (Sideline)

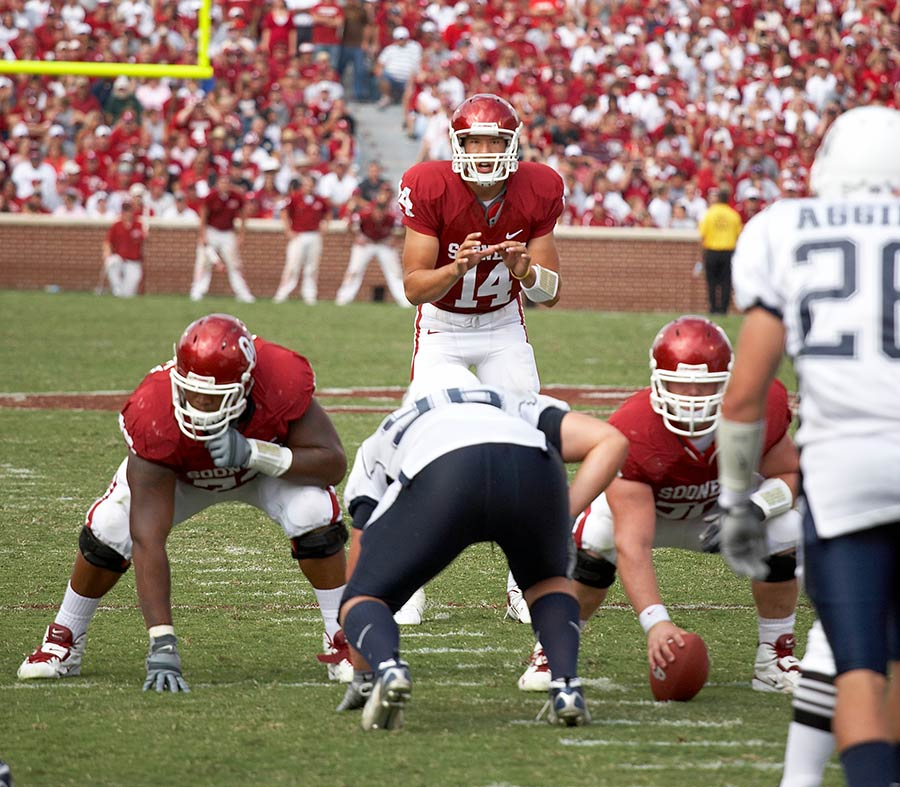
Oklahoma quarterback Sam Bradford awaits the snap.

The Sooners' third game of the season brought in the Utah State Aggies of the Western Athletic Conference, led by head coach Brent Guy. Oklahoma and Utah State had only met three times before with the Sooner winning all three by a combined score of 176–24. Utah State came into the game 0-2, but they held 4th quarter leads in both games. Going into the game, the Sooners were favored by about 46 points.

Utah State received the kickoff to start the game but were unable to produce a first down. Oklahoma QB Sam Bradford opened the game with eleven straight pass completions including three passes for 30 yards in the opening drive. The Sooners' touchdown came from a 35-yard rush from wide receiver Juaquin Iglesias. The Sooner defense again stopped Utah State and they again had to punt the ball. On the next Sooner possession, Bradford completed a 48-yard pass to Iglesias and a 27-yard touchdown pass to Malcolm Kelly. Sooner running back Allen Patrick, who had been recovering from an ankle injury during the last two games, scored a touchdown on a 69-yard run in the 2nd quarter. The Aggies were unable to score a touchdown the whole game and their only points came off a field goal by Peter Caldwell late in the 2nd quarter. Halftime came with the Sooners up 38–3.

Stoops began pulling his starters midway through the 3rd quarter. This move followed a 92-yard touchdown run from DeMarco Murray, the third longest in school history. Oklahoma quarterback Bradford came out of the game at this time after he completed nineteen of his 26 pass attempts for 255 yards and three touchdowns. He was replaced at quarterback by Keith Nichol. This was the first time Nichol followed Bradford as Joey Halzle had been the first backup the previous two games. The Sooners added 16 points in the 3rd quarter and did not score in the 4th quarter. According to Utah State's coach, they just "weren't good enough."

The Sooners, again, accomplished much in this game. Through three games, Oklahoma had scored 184 points. This set a new school record, breaking the previous record of 179 points in 1986. They had also won their first three games by 158 points, the most since 1972 when they outscored their first three opponents by 163 points. For the second time this season, and the fourth time under Stoops, the Sooners had more than 600 yards of total offense. Also, for the second time this season and under Stoops, the Sooners had over 400 yards of offense in a half. Bradford finished the Miami game with ten straight completions, and when combined with his eleven straight to start the game against Utah State, it made it the second longest streak in school history, behind Bradford's own streak of 22. This was Stoops' 50th win at home. Allen Patrick surpassed the 1,000 yard rushing mark for his career to become the 65th Sooner to do so.

=== Tulsa ===
#4 Oklahoma Sooners at Tulsa Golden Hurricane

Team	1	2	3	4	Total
• #4 Oklahoma	14	21	7	20	62
Tulsa	7	7	7	0	21

- Date: September 21
- Location: Skelly Stadium, Tulsa, Oklahoma
- Game start: 7:00 p.m. CST
- Game attendance: 35,542
- TV announcers (ESPN2): Sean McDonough (Play-by-play), Chris Spielman (Color) & Joe Schad (Sideline)

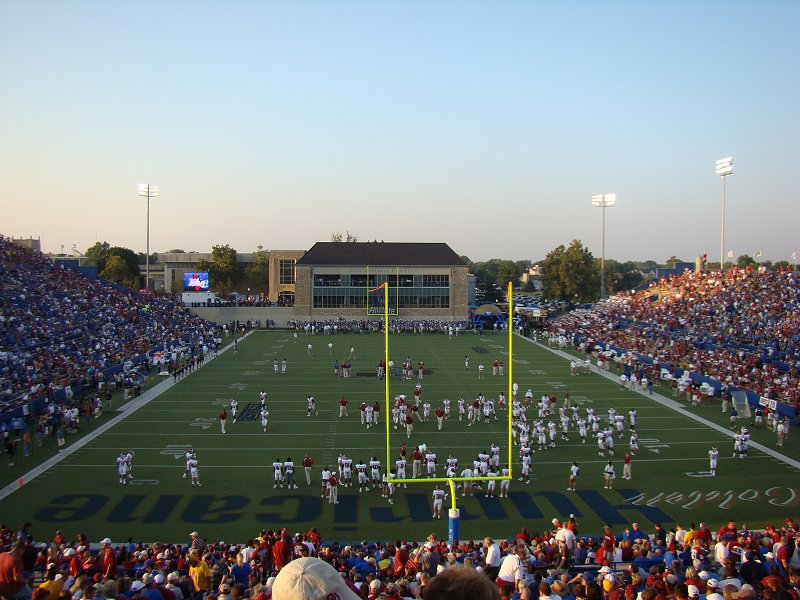
The Oklahoma Sooners prepare to take on the Tulsa Golden Hurricane.

The Sooners ventured 90 miles east to Tulsa to take on the Golden Hurricane and their new coach, Todd Graham. This was the first time that the two teams came into the game undefeated since 1919 (not including season openers). The Sooners last played the Conference USA-affiliated Golden Hurricane in 2005 in Norman and walked away with a 31–15 victory. Oklahoma and Tulsa first played in 1914 and had played 22 times with the Sooners leading the series, 14-7-1. Tulsa was led by senior quarterback Paul Smith who some considered the best quarterback in the state of Oklahoma, despite the early talk of Sam Bradford's Heisman chances. On September 17, 2007, the Sooners were favored to win by 20 points.

The Golden Hurricane came into the game following a high scoring defeat of BYU with a final score of 55–47. Both teams combined for over 1,000 passing yards. However, Tulsa had not defeated a team from an AQ conference since they defeated Oklahoma State in 1998. This was the first Friday game for Oklahoma since it last played at Tulsa in 2002.

The Sooners started the game with the ball, but an early interception – Bradford's second of the season – led to an early 7–0 Tulsa lead. The Sooners came back in the first quarter and scored two touchdowns on two big plays: a 29-yard run by Allen Patrick and a 46-yard pass to Juaquin Iglesias. The second quarter saw the Sooners widen their lead, even with Tulsa managing to score a touchdown off a 48-yard pass from Tulsa quarterback Paul Smith. The Sooners were ahead at halftime 35–14.

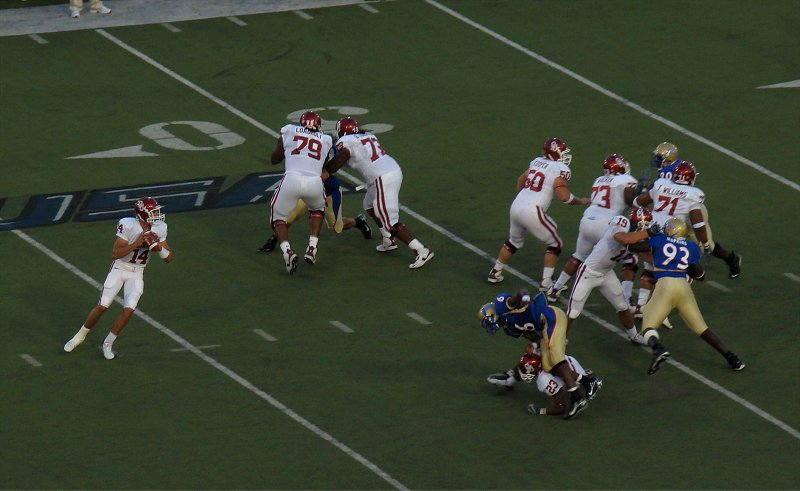
Sam Bradford looks for an open receiver.

The two teams traded touchdowns in the third quarter. Tulsa started the half with the ball and took over five minutes off the clock while driving 81 yards down the field to score a touchdown. It didn't take that long for the Sooners. Oklahoma running back DeMarco Murray took the ensuing kickoff and returned it 81 yards for the touchdown, and the Sooners shut down the Tulsa offense in the fourth quarter; Tulsa had four drives that combined for negative 12 yards. Oklahoma brought in many of its backups in the fourth including backup quarterback Joey Halzle and fourth-string running back Mossis Madu. While Oklahoma did score three touchdowns in the fourth quarter, they only attempted two passes (both completions).

The Sooner offense continued to dominate their opponents. In their first three games, the Sooners averaged 61 points per game, making them the highest scoring team in the nation. Against Tulsa, they managed to maintain that average after scoring 62 points. The Sooners had scored over 50 points in four games, the first time they had accomplished that since 2003, when they scored over 50 points against Fresno State, UCLA, Iowa State, and Texas. The Sooners also ranked third nationally in total offense coming into the game, averaging 565 total yards. Again, the Sooners remained consistent, putting up 553 yards of total offense against Tulsa. However, Tulsa, ranked fourth nationally in total offense after their first two games, did its damage in the air. Of Tulsa's 398 total yards, 354 were passing yards. Oklahoma also suffered its first major injury of the season. Starting defensive end John Williams tore his Achilles tendon and was lost for the rest of the season. He later applied for a medical redshirt in hopes of getting a sixth year of eligibility. This was the second injury for Williams in his career at Oklahoma, the first coming when he tore his anterior cruciate ligament in the first game of the 2005 season.

=== Colorado ===
#3 Oklahoma Sooners at Colorado Buffaloes

Team	1	2	3	4	Total
#3 Oklahoma	7	10	7	0	24
• Colorado	0	7	3	17	27

- Date: September 29
- Location: Folsom Field, Boulder, Colorado
- Game start: 12:30 p.m. CST
- Game attendance: 50,031
- TV announcers (FSN): Joel Meyers (Play-by-play), Dave Lapham (Color) & Jim Knox (Sideline)

Oklahoma opened up their Big 12 schedule on the road with Colorado. Head coach Dan Hawkins was in his second year as head coach of the Buffaloes and was looking to improve on the 2–10 record of the last year as well as put an end to OU's five-game winning streak against CU. This was Colorado's Big 12 opener as well as their homecoming. The Buffaloes had lost fourteen consecutive games to ranked opponents, and heading into this one, the Sooners were favored to win by 23 points. Through four games, OU was the highest scoring team in the nation with 61.5 points per game and had the second-most efficient quarterback with freshman star Sam Bradford.

Oklahoma was first to score by capitalizing on a D.J. Wolfe interception returned to the Colorado 11. Sam Bradford connected with Juaquin Iglesias for the 13-yard touchdown. The Buffaloes scored next by driving the ball 70 yards capped off by a 25-yard touchdown rush by Hugh Charles. The Sooners responded 49 seconds later thanks to a 34-yard touchdown run by Allen Patrick. The Sooners added three more off of a 28-yard Garrett Hartley field goal to go into halftime with a 17–7 lead. The second half began with a three-and-out by OU. Three plays later, Wolfe made his second interception on Buffalo QB Cody Hawkins and returned it 28 yards to the Colorado 17. On the next play, Patrick ran it in for a TD. These would be the last points scored by the Sooners for the rest of the game. Three drives later, including another three-and-out by OU, Buffalo kicker Kevin Eberhart kicked a 41-yard field goal to make the score 24-10, with OU up by 14. Following the kickoff and a six-yard rush by Patrick, Bradford was intercepted by Colorado defender Ryan Walters at the Colorado 38-yard line. The fourth quarter began with the Buffaloes on 3rd and goal at the Oklahoma 4. Unable to convert on third down, they went for it on fourth down and made it into the endzone. Four drives later, one ending in a missed field goal by the Buffaloes followed by another interception of Bradford, the Buffaloes scored again, tying the game at 24. After another three-and-out by the Sooners, Colorado's final drive took them from the 50-yard line to the Oklahoma 28, where a 45-yard field goal with two seconds left ran out the clock and gave them the upset over the #3 Oklahoma Sooners.

=== Texas (Red River Rivalry) ===
#10 Oklahoma Sooners vs. #19 Texas Longhorns

Team	1	2	3	4	Total
• #10 Oklahoma	7	7	7	7	28
#19 Texas	0	14	0	7	21

- Date: October 6
- Location: Cotton Bowl, Dallas
- Game start: 2:30 p.m.
- Game attendance: 80,000
- TV announcers (ABC): Brad Nessler (Play-by-play), Bob Griese (Color), Paul Maguire (Color) & Bonnie Bernstein (Sideline)

Scoring summary
1	0:39	OU	Jermaine Gresham 1-yard pass from Sam Bradford (Garrett Hartley kick)	OU 7–0
2	11:36	TEX	Jordan Shipley 6-yard pass from Colt McCoy (Ryan Bailey kick)	Tied 7–7
2	6:58	TEX	Jermichael Finley 22-yard pass from Colt McCoy (Ryan Bailey kick)	TEX 14–7
2	4:03	OU	Jermaine Gresham 7-yard pass from Sam Bradford (Garrett Hartley kick)	Tied 14–14
3	4:24	OU	DeMarco Murray 65-yard run (Garrett Hartley kick)	OU 21–14
4	14:57	TEX	Vondrell McGee 1-yard run (Ryan Bailey kick)	Tied 21–21
4	10:42	OU	Malcolm Kelly 35-yard pass from Sam Bradford (Garrett Hartley kick)	OU 28–21

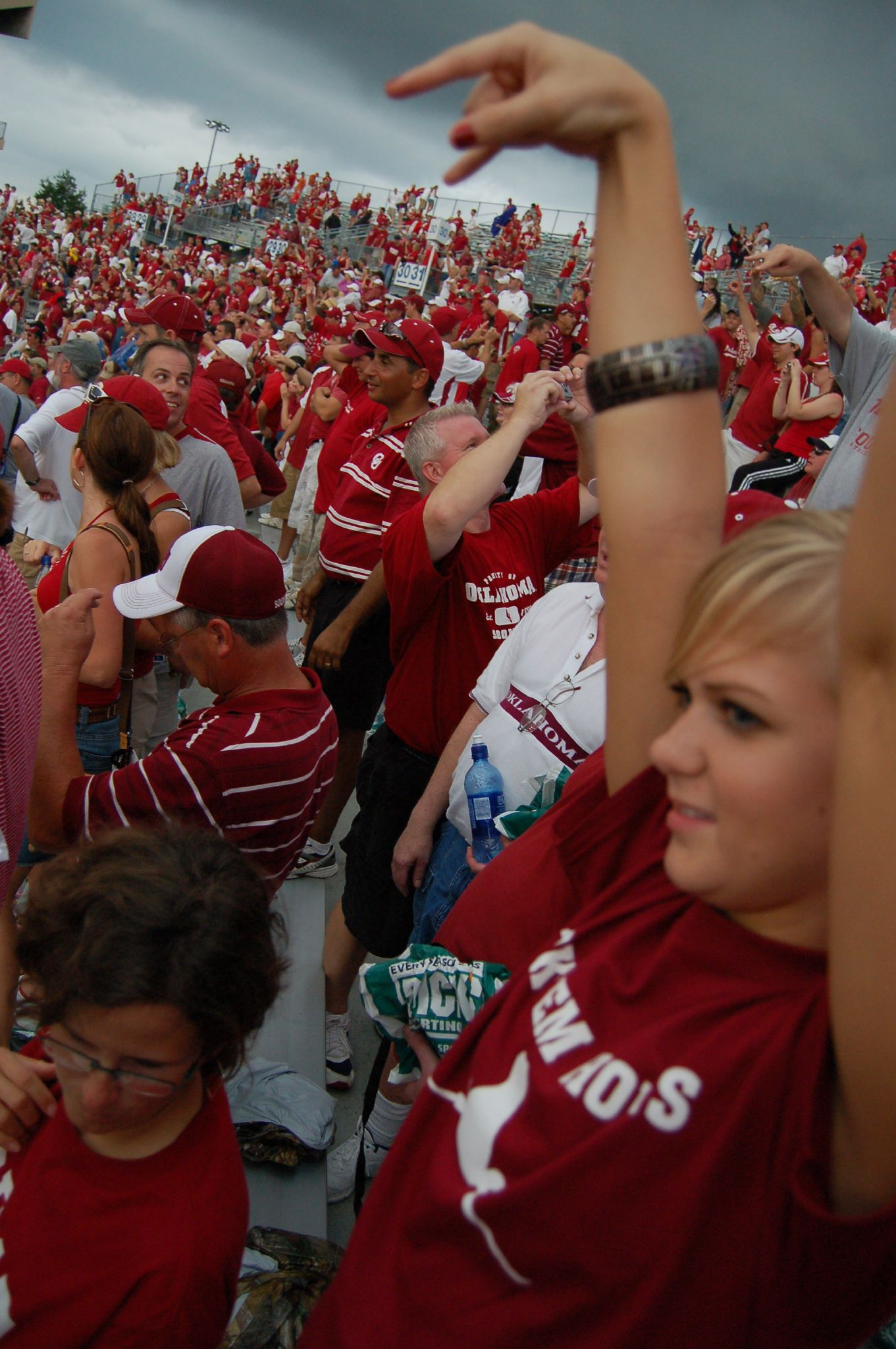
A Sooner fan taunts Texas by making an upside down Hook 'em Horns sign.

The game against the 2007 Texas Longhorns football team marked the 102nd meeting of the AT&T Red River Rivalry, a rivalry that has been called one of the greatest in all of sports. It's the current longest running rivalry for the Longhorns and the second longest for Oklahoma, behind only the Bedlam Series with Oklahoma State.

This game was listed by CBS Sportsline.com as number six on the list of games to watch during the 2007 season. "The annual Red River Shootout in Dallas will once again feature two top-ten teams with the winner being the front-runner for not only a Big 12 title but a factor in the national title picture. The game will also feature one of the best match-ups of the year with Limas Sweed and Billy Pittman of the Longhorns facing against Oklahoma's excellent secondary." However, the matchup was hurt when both teams suffered unexpected losses the week before. The last time both teams entered the game after a loss was 1999. The morning of the Red River Rivalry, oddsmakers favored Oklahoma to win by 12–13 points.

The game was a back-and-forth affair that was ultimately won by Oklahoma 28–21. Oklahoma's Sam Bradford was 21–of–32 for 244 yards with three touchdowns and no interceptions. UT's Colt McCoy was 19–of–26 for 324 yards and two touchdowns. McCoy threw one interception and Jamaal Charles lost a fumble inside the Oklahoma 5 yard-line on what would have most likely been a touchdown scoring run. The Sooners did not commit any turnovers. The Longhorns ended the game with 385 total yards to the Sooners 414. The Oklahoma defense held Texas to 61 rushing yards, their lowest total of the season (their previous low was 117 against Arkansas State). Cornerback Reggie Smith was named the Big 12 Defensive Player of the Week for his defensive performance against Texas. It was the second time Smith had received this honor that season.

The match was highlighted by the play of a few notable Sooners including freshman running back DeMarco Murray, wide receivers Juaquin Iglesias and Malcolm Kelly, and quarterback Sam Bradford. Murray finished the game with 128 yards on 17 carries including a 65-yard touchdown run. Kelly caught five passes for 105 yards including a 41-yard catch that led to an Oklahoma touchdown and a game winning 35 yard touchdown catch. Iglesias finished with six catches for 99 yards even though two of his catches were counted as laterals. Bradford led the Sooner offense against Texas for the first time. Kelly made note of Bradford's demeanor: "His demeanor never changes. Never looks happy, never looks sad. That's just Sam." Bradford led the Sooners on an 84-yard touchdown drive in the 1st quarter and a 94-yard touchdown drive in the 4th quarter.

With the loss, Texas opened conference play 0–2 for the first time since 1956, when they were in the Southwest Conference and one year before Darrell Royal became head coach of the Longhorns. The win kept the Sooners in position to win the South Division of the Big 12 Conference.

=== Missouri ===
#11 Missouri Tigers at #6 Oklahoma Sooners

Team	1	2	3	4	Total
#11 Missouri	7	3	14	7	31
• #6 Oklahoma	10	7	6	18	41

- Date: October 13
- Location: Gaylord Family Oklahoma Memorial Stadium, Norman, Oklahoma
- Game start: 5:30 p.m. CST
- Game attendance: 85,041
- TV announcers (FSN): Joel Meyers (Play-by-play), Gary Reasons (Color) & Emily Jones (Sideline)

After three games away from home, the Sooners returned to Norman to take on Gary Pinkel's undefeated Missouri Tigers in front of 85,041 fans. The Tigers were picked by some in the preseason to win the Big 12 North. Coming into the game, the Sooners were 16–1 against Missouri since 1984 including a 26–10 win the past season. The crew of ESPN's College GameDay made a visit to Norman, adding to the meaning of this Homecoming bout. The Tigers entered the game ranked 11 in both polls, their highest ranking since 1981. The game matched the two highest ranked teams in the Big 12 at the time and was a preview of the Big 12 Championship.

The Tigers came into the game with a Heisman-hopeful quarterback, Chase Daniel, and Jeremy Maclin, the nation's leader in all-purpose yardage (Maclin originally committed to Oklahoma but decommitted and went to Missouri). Daniel broke Missouri's record for passing in a single season in 2006 when he threw for 3,527 yards. He was also a run threat averaging 38 yards per game on the ground. However, the Tigers were without their leader rusher, Tony Temple, who was out with a sprained ankle. On the Oklahoma side, Sam Bradford again came into the game as the nation's top-rated passer.

The game started rough for Oklahoma. Missouri received the ball first but did not cross midfield and was forced to punt the ball to Oklahoma. Bradford completed his first pass to Juaquin Iglesias but Iglesias lost the ball turning it over to Missouri at Oklahoma's 38 yard line. Missouri ran four passing plays and two rushes and scored the first touchdown of the game. Oklahoma answered on their next possession, running 12 plays and driving 64 yards for the tying touchdown. Garrett Hartley added a 28-yard field goal late in the 1st quarter to give the Sooners the lead. Bradford extended Oklahoma's lead in the 2nd quarter on pass completions of 30, 21, and 30 yards, the final one being a touchdown pass to tight end Jermaine Gresham. Missouri added a field goal to close out the 1st half bringing the Tigers within a touchdown.

On Oklahoma's first possession of the second half, running back Chris Brown rushed for a touchdown but a failed PAT brought the score to 23–10 in Oklahoma's favor. On the very next drive, Missouri went 68 yards for a touchdown. On the ensuing kickoff to Oklahoma, returner Juaquin Iglesias fumbled the ball and Missouri recovered on Oklahoma's 46 yard line. Another Missouri touchdown gave the Tigers the lead 24–23. The Sooners answered on their next possession with another rushing touchdown from Chris Brown. The Sooners attempted a two-point conversion but failed. On Missouri's next possession, Daniel attempted a handoff to Maclin but a miscommunication led to a fumble which was picked up by Oklahoma's Curtis Lofton and returned for a touchdown. Another failed two-point conversion led to a score of 35–24 in favor of Oklahoma. Another Sooner touchdown in the 4th quarter gave Oklahoma a 41–24 lead. Missouri had a late 4th quarter drive which resulted in a touchdown and a final score of 41–31.

Missouri amassed 418 total yards to Oklahoma's 384. 361 of those Missouri yards game through the air compared to Oklahoma's 266. Both teams averaged 7.4 yards per pass attempt. The Sooners managed 118 yards on the ground while they held the Tigers to just 57. Both teams struggled to hold onto the ball. Oklahoma finished with two turnovers, both from Juaquin Iglesias, while Missouri had four, one fumble and three interceptions. Bradford finished the game completing 24 of his 34 passes with two touchdowns and no interceptions. Chris Brown led the team on the ground with 67 rushing yards, 5.2 yards per attempt and three touchdowns. Lofton was named the Big 12 Defensive Player of the Week for his performance in the game which included one fumble recovery returned for a touchdown, seven solo tackles and eleven assisted tackles. It was the third time an Oklahoma defensive player had received the award in seven weeks.

=== Iowa State ===
#4 Oklahoma Sooners at Iowa State Cyclones

Team	1	2	3	4	Total
• #4 Oklahoma	0	0	7	10	17
Iowa State	7	0	0	0	7

- Date: October 20
- Location: Jack Trice Stadium, Ames, Iowa
- Game start: 11:30 a.m. CST
- Game attendance: 49,511
- TV announcers (FSN): Bill Land (Play-by-play), Dave Lapham (Color) & Jim Knox (Sideline)

Going back on the road, the Sooners traveled to Ames, Iowa, to take on first year head coach Gene Chizik and his Iowa State Cyclones. Chizik previously served on the coaching staff of the Texas Longhorns, so he was familiar with Oklahoma. However, history was on Oklahoma's side. Going into the game, the Sooners were an overall 66–5–2 against the Cyclones with only two of those losses coming in Ames (1928 and 1960).

The game nearly went against the Sooners. Oklahoma went three-and-out on their opening possession. On their next possession, Allen Patrick fumbled the ball, turning it over to Iowa State on Oklahoma's 20 yard line. Iowa State converted for a touchdown taking the early lead. It was a defensive struggle for the rest of the first half with neither team scoring. Iowa State had a couple chances to extend their lead, but the OU defense stood strong. The Cyclones missed a 36-yard field goal and the Sooner's defense stopped Iowa State on a 4th down play.

Oklahoma tied the game in the third quarter on a drive that lasted over four minutes. The Sooners took the lead with another touchdown on a drive that started in the third quarter and ended in the fourth. Garrett Hartley added a field goal with less than two minutes remaining to put the Sooners up by 10 points and secure the game.

=== Texas A&M ===
Texas A&M Aggies at #5 Oklahoma Sooners

Team	1	2	3	4	Total
Texas A&M	0	0	0	14	14
• #5 Oklahoma	7	14	14	7	42

- Date: November 3
- Location: Gaylord Family Oklahoma Memorial Stadium, Norman, Oklahoma
- Game start: 7:00 p.m. CST
- Game attendance: 85,044
- TV announcers (ABC): Ron Franklin (Play-by-play), Ed Cunningham (Color) & Jack Arute (Sideline)

The Sooners, coming off of a bye week, took on Texas A&M led by fifth year head coach Dennis Franchione. During his tenure at Oklahoma, Bob Stoops had compiled a 7–1 record for games played directly after a bye week. The Aggies' trips to Norman had been unkind ever since Stoops took over in 1999. Stoops' teams had combined to score 144 points in three games to Texas A&M's 40 points including the 77–0 victory in 2003. In 2006, however, the Sooners escaped College Station with a one-point victory. In addition, Aggie running back Mike Goodson ran for a career record 127 yards against the Sooners tough run defense. In CBS Sports' weekly "Expert Picks", all five reporters chose Oklahoma to win. Two days prior to the game, Las Vegas casinos favored OU to win by 21 points.

The Sooners got on the board first late in the first quarter when Texas A&M's punt returner Roger Holland muffed the punt and Oklahoma recovered at the 33 yard line. Sam Bradford completed a pass to tight end Jermaine Gresham for the first touchdown of the game. The Aggies went three-and-out in their next possession and Oklahoma began their next drive on their own 39 yard line. The first quarter ended in the middle of an Oklahoma drive. Bradford completed another pass to Gresham for a touchdown to open the second quarter. The two teams traded possessions for several series. Late in the second quarter, Aggie Keondra Smith fumbled the ball and Oklahoma recovered. The Sooners went on a 68-yard drive ending with Bradford completing a pass to Chris Brown for a touchdown.

The Aggies opened the third quarter with the ball but went three-and-out. Oklahoma followed suit. On the Aggie's next possession, kicker Matt Szymanski missed a 45-yard field goal. Halfway through the third quarter, Oklahoma began their drive on their own 17 yard line with an 18-yard rush by DeMarco Murray that was followed a couple plays later by a 45 pass to Malcolm Kelly. The Sooners finished the drive with another touchdown pass to Gresham to take a 35-point lead. Texas A&M scored their first points on an 80-yard drive that began in the third quarter and ended in the fourth. Oklahoma answered with their final touchdown of the game on the ensuing possession while also taking over eight minutes off the clock. The Aggies added seven more points with less than a minute to go in the game to bring the final score to 42–14.

It was another big game for freshman quarterback Bradford but it was also a big game for sophomore tight end Jermaine Gresham. Gresham tied a school record by catching four touchdown passes in a single game. Also, for the second time this season, Bradford tied the school record for most touchdown passes in a game with five. Oklahoma added a new feature to its offensive playbook when running back DeMarco Murray was in the quarterback position for five plays. Stoops said this is "something we're going to keep working with." However, the Sooners did lose a key player to injury. Auston English, who led the Big 12 in sacks, left the game in the second quarter to what was later found to be a hairline fracture in his ankle. In the days following the game, it was reported by ESPN that Texas A&M head coach Franchione had possibly reached a settlement with the university that would have him leave the university at the end of the season. However, other sources still said that Franchione would be evaluated at the end of the season and no settlement was being discussed. Immediately following Texas A&M's final regular season game against rival Texas, Franchione announced he was stepping down. School sources said he accepted a buyout.

=== Baylor ===
Baylor Bears at #4 Oklahoma Sooners

Team	1	2	3	4	Total
Baylor	7	7	7	0	21
• #4 Oklahoma	14	14	14	10	52

- Date: November 10
- Location: Gaylord Family Oklahoma Memorial Stadium, Boulder, Colorado
- Game start: 5:30 p.m. CST
- TV announcers (FSN): Bill Land (Play-by-play), Gary Reasons (Color) & Emily Jones (Sideline)

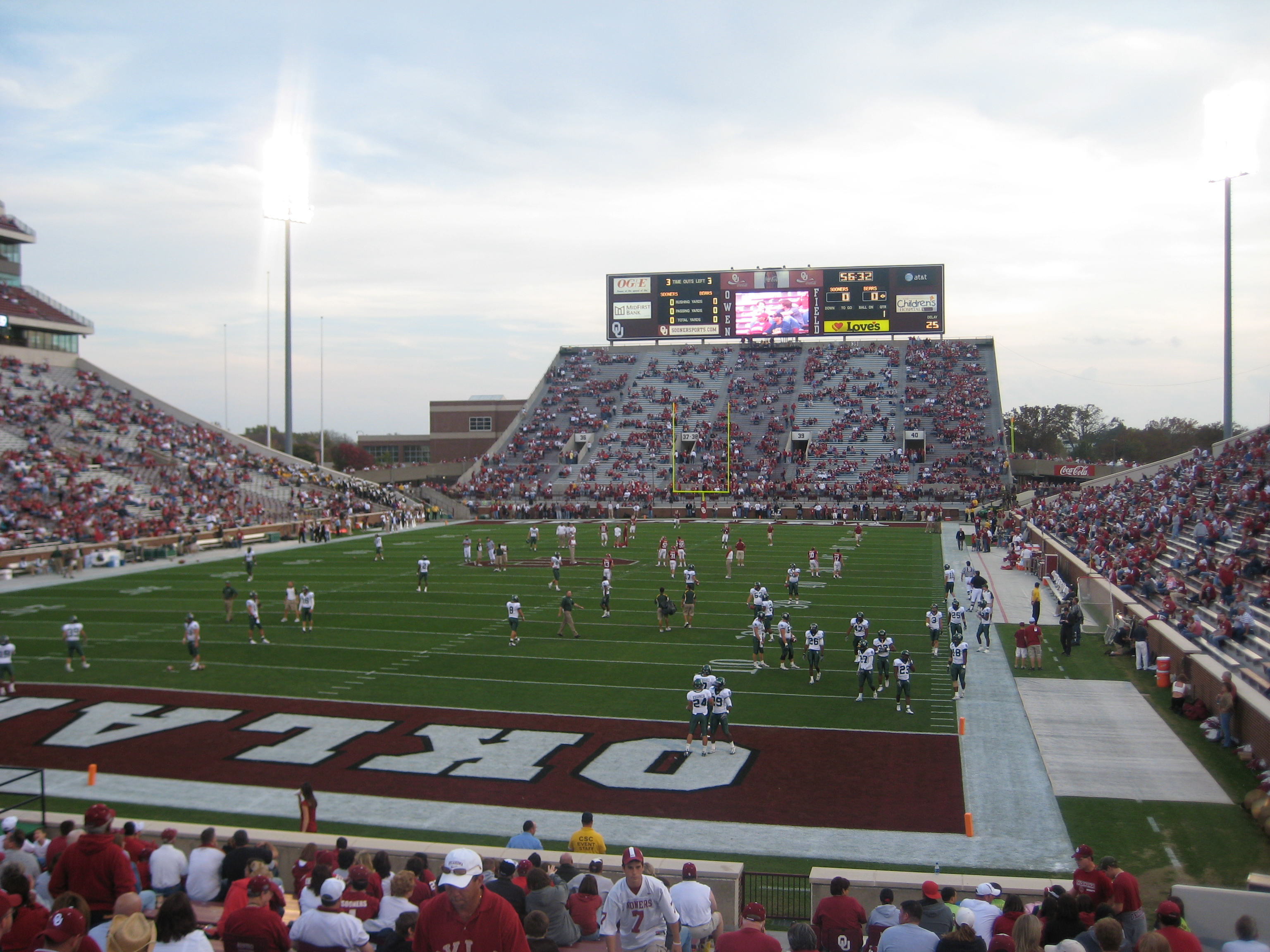
The Sooners prepare to take on the Baylor Bears.

On November 10, Guy Morriss brought his Baylor Bears to Norman to take on the Sooners. The Sooners had never lost to the Bears, going 16–0 since the first game between the two teams in 1901 (with the second game being in 1973). In 2006, the Sooners held the Bears to −48 yards total rushing. However, the last time the Bears were in Norman, they took the Sooners to double overtime before Oklahoma finally pulled out the win. Under Bob Stoops, the Sooners had outscored the Bears 287–76.

The Bears got the early leap on the Sooners. Running back Brandon Whitaker scored on a 46-yard touchdown run halfway through the first quarter to put the Bears up 7–0. The Sooners responded on their next possession. The Sooners started on their own 28 yard line and capped the drive off with a 25-yard touchdown run from DeMarco Murray. Baylor went three and out on their next possession and gave the ball back to Oklahoma on the Oklahoma 49 yard line. The Sooners only needed one play to score again and that came on a 51-yard touchdown pass from Sam Bradford to Malcolm Kelly. On their next drive, Baylor drove to Oklahoma's 21 yard line, was forced to settle for a field goal, then missed. On the next possession, Bradford connected with tight end Jermaine Gresham for a 43-yard pass that set up a one-yard touchdown run for Murray. Late in the 2nd quarter, Baylor quarterback Blake Szymanski threw a 75-yard touchdown pass to Thomas White to bring the score to 21–14. On the ensuing kickoff, returner Murray let the ball roll past him before he picked it up near the 10 yard line. He managed to shed tacklers and get to the outside and to return the kickoff 91 yards for a touchdown and bring the score to 28–14 before going into halftime.

The Sooners started with the ball in the third quarter and quickly converted. Bradford connected with Joe John Finley for a 21-yard gain and Manuel Johnson on a 60-yard touchdown pass to give Oklahoma the 21 point advantage. Oklahoma further extended the lead later in the third with another touchdown. Baylor responded with a 42-yard touchdown pass to cut the lead back to 42–21. On the Sooners' next possession, Garrett Hartley added three points on a field goal. Late in the fourth quarter, Oklahoma added the final seven points when Murray rushed for a 21-yard touchdown run to bring the final score to 52–21.

Again, the Oklahoma freshman stole the show. Quarterback Sam Bradford finished the game connecting 21 of his 26 passes for 353 yards and three touchdowns. The performance put him back atop the passing efficiency standings where he spent most of the early season. His passing efficiency for the season through Baylor was 180.4, ahead of Florida's Tim Tebow at 177.1. DeMarco Murray scored four touchdowns and averaged over seven yards on his 13 rushing attempts. Murray was also named the Big 12 Special Teams Player of the Week for his accomplishments. However, the Baylor offense also performed better than expected. The Sooners' ninth-ranked defense allowed Baylor to gain 450 yards of total offense. Baylor running back Brandon Whitaker (from Edmond, Oklahoma) had 15 carries for 149 yards and 10 catches for 68 yards.

=== Texas Tech ===
#3 Oklahoma Sooners at Texas Tech Red Raiders

Team	1	2	3	4	Total
#3 Oklahoma	7	3	3	14	27
• Texas Tech	13	14	7	0	34

- Date: November 17
- Location: Jones AT&T Stadium, Lubbock, Texas
- Game start: 7:00 p.m. CST
- Game attendance: 55,038
- TV announcers (ABC): Brad Nessler (Play-by-play), Bob Griese (Color) & Bonnie Bernstein (Sideline)

The Sooners travel led to Lubbock, Texas, to take on the Texas Tech Red Raiders and head coach Mike Leach for the Sooners' final road game of the regular season and Texas Tech's final game of the regular season. The Sooners led this series 11–3 since the first game was played in 1992. In the last game between the two in 2006, the Sooners trailed 24–10 late in the second quarter but went on to score 24 unanswered points to win 34–24. Oklahoma receiver Malcolm Kelly also tied a school record with 11 receptions in that game.

The game started well for Oklahoma against Tech's pass-happy offense. After starting at their own 20-yard line, Tech's quarterback Graham Harrell completed four straight passes to bring them to midfield. On the fifth play, Harrell's pass was intercepted by Lendy Holmes and returned for a touchdown to give Oklahoma the early lead. Tech answered on their next two possessions with two field goals to cut Oklahoma's lead to one point. On Oklahoma's first offensive play, quarterback Sam Bradford handed the ball off to Allen Patrick who immediately fumbled. Bradford made the tackle on the Tech player but suffered a concussion. Bradford did not show any immediate signs as he played on the ensuing Oklahoma possession, but he later told quarterbacks coach Josh Heupel that he did not remember any of the plays from the previous drive and as a result was benched for the remainder of the game, replaced by backup Joey Halzle. Following Tech's two field goals, they scored a touchdown on each of their next three possessions. Late in the second quarter, Tech fumbled the ball and it was recovered by Oklahoma. Oklahoma was unable to score a touchdown but managed a field goal with less than ten seconds remaining in the first half. Texas Tech went into halftime with a 27–10 lead.

Unlike the first quarter, the third quarter did not start well for the Sooners. The Sooners went three-and-out and Tech answered with another touchdown. On the Sooners' next possession, they ran six rushing plays against three passing plays and made another field goal. Tech missed a 51-yard field goal on their next possession. The two teams traded possessions for the remainder of the third quarter. Oklahoma went three-and-out; Tech got a first down on the first play, then went three-and-out. Tech intercepted Halzle on the next possession and Oklahoma responded with their own interception on the next play. Halzle began to click midway through the fourth quarter, but by then it was too late. Halzle completed a 65-yard touchdown pass to Manuel Johnson with less than eight minutes remaining to make it a two-possession game. Oklahoma got to the Tech seven-yard line on their next possession but failed to convert. On their following possession, they got to the Tech 14-yard line but again failed to convert. With less than a minute left in the game, Halzle completed a 47-yard pass to Juaquin Iglesias that set up a 9-yard touchdown pass to Johnson to bring the Sooners within seven points. The Sooners attempted an onside kick with 20 seconds remaining but Tech got the ball and ran out the clock.

This was a game of injuries for Oklahoma. Besides Bradford, DeMarco Murray suffered a dislocated kneecap which ended his season. Adron Tennell suffered a torn anterior cruciate ligament and was out the remainder of the season. Alan Davis sustained either a concussion or major "stinger" and missed the next game.

The Sooners struggled offensively under Halzle for the first three quarters. Halzle showed improvement in the fourth quarter, when he completed 13 of 22 passes for 230 yards and two touchdowns. Oklahoma still managed 408 yards of total offense, not far from Tech's 473. Oklahoma kept Tech below their season averages in both points and total yards. Tech quarterback Harrell finished the game completing 47 of his 72 pass attempts for 420 yards. He became the sixth NCAA Division I FBS quarterback to pass for more than 5,000 yards in a season. Oklahoma linebacker Curtis Lofton also set a school record for eight games with 10 or more tackles.

=== Oklahoma State (Bedlam Series) ===
Oklahoma State Cowboys at #10 Oklahoma Sooners

Team	1	2	3	4	Total
Oklahoma State	7	3	7	0	17
• #10 Oklahoma	14	14	7	14	49

- Date: November 24
- Location: Gaylord Family Oklahoma Memorial Stadium, Norman, Oklahoma
- Game start: 2:30 p.m. CST
- Game attendance: 85,238
- TV announcers (FSN): Bill Land (Play-by-play), Gary Reasons (Color) & Emily Jones (Sideline)

Scoring summary
1	10:33	OU	Allen Patrick 11-yard pass from Sam Bradford (Garrett Hartley kick)	OU 7–0
1	6:24	OU	Allen Patrick 5-yard run (Garrett Hartley kick)	OU 14–0
1	0:31	OSU	Dantrell Savage 16-yard pass from Zac Robinson (Dan Bailey kick)	OU 14–7
2	11:49	OU	Chris Brown 3-yard run (Garrett Hartley kick)	OU 21–7
2	2:25	OU	Joe Jon Finley 2-yard pass from Sam Bradford (Garrett Hartley kick)	OU 28–7
2	0:04	OSU	Dan Bailey 28-yard field goal	OU 28–10
3	4:24	OSU	Dantrell Savage 6-yard run (Dan Bailey kick)	OU 28–17
3	1:26	OU	Joe Jon Finley 12-yard pass from Sam Bradford (Garrett Hartley kick)	OU 35–17
4	12:21	OU	Allen Patrick 2-yard run (Garrett Hartley kick)	OU 42–17
4	7:21	OU	Quentin Chaney 16-yard pass from Sam Bradford (Garrett Hartley kick)	OU 49–17

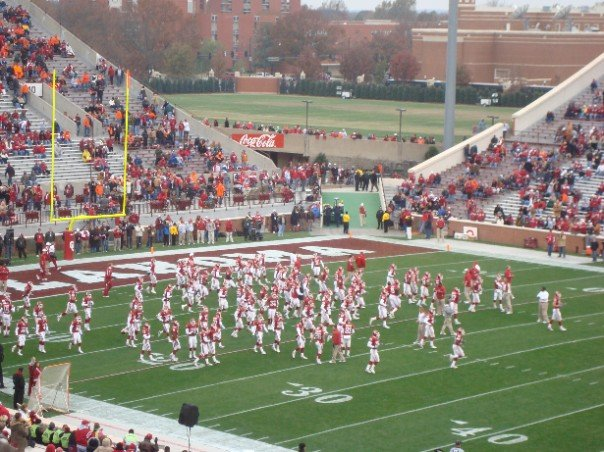
The Sooners prepare to take on the Oklahoma State Cowboys.

The end of the regular season brought in-state rival Oklahoma State to Norman. This rivalry, referred to as Bedlam, encompasses all sports with football being at the top. The rivalry is the most lopsided series in the nation featuring two teams from the same state with Oklahoma leading the series 78–16–7 going into the game. Oklahoma had won 94% of the matches when ranked higher than Oklahoma State. However, the games had a tendency to remain close. Under Bob Stoops, four of the seven games had been decided by six points or less and Oklahoma State was the only Big 12 team to have beaten Oklahoma at home under Stoops. Both teams in this matchup were missing key players. Oklahoma running back DeMarco Murray was injured in the previous game and was out for the season. Oklahoma State's top receiver Adarius Bowman also suffered a knee injury in an earlier game and would also miss the Bedlam match. However, Oklahoma QB Sam Bradford was able to come back after sustaining a concussion in the previous game.

Oklahoma began the game with the ball and capitalized quickly. On the opening kickoff, Juaquin Iglesias returned the ball 47 yards to the 50 yard line. The Sooners relied on the running game throughout the entire game. The Sooners worked their way towards the endzone with nine plays, seven rushing and two passing, to take the early lead. Oklahoma State went three-and-out on their first possession and Oklahoma began their next possession on their own 42 yard line. This time, it only took Oklahoma six plays, all rushing, to get back in the endzone. This included a 41-yard run by Allen Patrick. Oklahoma State had more success on their next possession. Beginning on their own 13 yard line, the Cowboys drove the 87 yards on 13 plays to get seven points of their own on the board. Oklahoma answered with another touchdown on their next possession which included a 32-yard run for Patrick. The Sooner defense was tested on the next possession. Again, the Cowboys started deep in their own territory. They drove nearly 60 yards to Oklahoma's 13 yard line. On the next play, the Cowboys got the first down when Dantrell Savage ran for 12 yards before being tackled at Oklahoma's one-yard line. Oklahoma State tried three rushing plays up the middle but were stuffed by Oklahoma's defense. On the fourth attempt, rather than kick a field goal, the Cowboy offense tried one last time to get in the endzone. Rather than run straight up the middle as they had tried the previous three times, quarterback Zac Robinson rushed to the right but was tackled by Curtis Lofton. The ball popped loose and Oklahoma's D.J. Wolfe recovered it and was tackled at the Oklahoma 13 yard line. Oklahoma followed with another touchdown that saw Bradford's two longest pass of the first half – a 24-yard throw to Jermaine Gresham and another of the same distance to Iglesias. Bradford completed a two-yard touchdown pass to Joe Jon Finley, his 30th touchdown pass of the season. That pass broke the NCAA record for most touchdown passes for a freshman quarterback. The previous record was set in 1998 by Nevada's David Neill and tied in 2006 by Texas's Colt McCoy. Oklahoma State managed to score a field goal in the closing seconds of the first half. Oklahoma had scored a touchdown on every possession in the first half to give them a 28–10 lead going into halftime.

Oklahoma State began the second half with the ball. The Cowboys managed to get to Oklahoma's 23 yard line but had to settle for a field goal attempt. The 40 yard attempt by Dan Bailey hit the goal post and bounced to the ground. The Sooner's next possession saw Bradford make an uncharacteristic mistake. Bradford's pass was intercepted and returned 23 yards to Oklahoma's one-yard line. The defense was unable to stop this one. After being set back five yards on a penalty, Savage rushed up the middle on the first play to get the touchdown and put the Cowboys within 11 points halfway through the third quarter. But the Oklahoma defense did not allow an Oklahoma State first down for the rest of the game. The Sooners, meanwhile, went on to score three more touchdowns on their next three possessions. The Sooners received the ball for the last time with 5:37 left on the clock but drained the clock, ending the game with a final score of 49–17 in favor of the Sooners.

The Sooners managed to hold a team averaging nearly 500 yards per game to 299 total yards. Oklahoma State was also averaging 271 yards per game in the air but were held to a season-low 104 yards. Running back Allen Patrick ran for a career-best 202 yards after coming off his worst game of his career against Texas Tech. Sam Bradford completed 11 of his 15 pass attempts for 150 yards and added four touchdown passes to his total which then stood at 32. The four TD passes he threw was the same amount of incompletions he threw. Linebacker Curtis Lofton was named the Big 12 Defensive Player of the Week for his performance which included nine tackles and a forced fumble. With the win, the Sooners won the Big 12 South division title outright and secured their spot in the Big 12 Championship game which was played the following week.

=== Missouri (Big 12 Championship Game) ===
#9 Oklahoma Sooners vs. #1 Missouri Tigers

Team	1	2	3	4	Total
• #9 Oklahoma	0	14	14	10	38
#1 Missouri	3	11	0	3	17

- Date: December 1
- Location: Alamodome, San Antonio, Texas
- Game start: 7:00 p.m. CST
- Game attendance: 62,585
- TV announcers (ABC): Brent Musburger (Play-by-play), Kirk Herbstreit (Color) & Lisa Salters (Sideline)

Scoring summary
1	3:19	MU	Jeff Wolfert 28-yard field goal	MU 3–0
2	14:57	OU	Chris Brown 6-yard run (Garrett Hartley kick)	OU 7–3
2	9:46	MU	Jeff Wolfert 18-yard field goal	OU 7–6
2	3:41	OU	Chris Brown 3-yard run (Garrett Hartley kick)	OU 14–6
2	0:14	MU	Chase Daniel 4-yard run (Jeremy Maclin to Martin Rucker pass)	Tied 14–14
3	4:04	OU	Allen Patrick 4-yard run (Garrett Hartley kick)	OU 21–14
3	2:32	OU	Jermaine Gresham 5-yard pass from Sam Bradford (Garrett Hartley kick)	OU 28–14
4	14:51	MU	Jeff Wolfert 32 field goal	OU 28–17
4	10:28	OU	Joe Jon Finley 4-yard pass from Sam Bradford (Garrett Hartley kick)	OU 35–17
4	3:42	OU	Garrett Hartley 26-yard field goal	OU 38–17

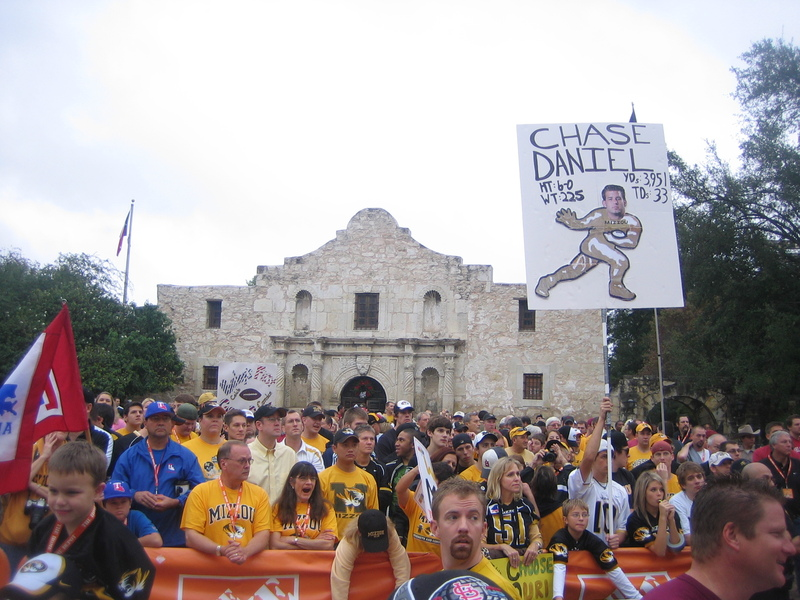
Missouri fans in front of the Alamo before the game.

The Dr. Pepper Big 12 Championship Game was held in San Antonio, Texas at the Alamodome for the third time; it previously hosted the game in 1997 and 1999. This was Oklahoma's sixth appearance in the game, more than any other conference member. The Tigers were guaranteed a spot in the BCS National Championship Game with a win over the Sooners. The two teams had previously met in Norman, where Oklahoma defeated Missouri 41–31. The crew of College GameDay previewed the matchup in front of the Alamo. The GameDay crew had featured the earlier Oklahoma-Missouri game as well. Even though this game was on a neutral field and Missouri had their star running back Tony Temple (who was injured for the first meeting), the #1 Tigers were 3-point underdogs to the eighth-ranked Sooners.

The game started out slowly, with a series of punts by both teams. On Missouri's third possession, a combination of Chase Daniel passes and Tony Temple rushes carried the Tigers down to the Oklahoma 11 yard drive, where the Sooners' defense stepped up and forced a 28-yard Jeff Wolfert field goal. On the ensuing kickoff, Oklahoma's Allen Patrick returned the ball to the OU 33 yard line. A couple of Sam Bradford passes combined with a Chris Brown rush found the Sooners at 2nd and 7 on their own 46-yard line, when Bradford connected with Malcolm Kelly for a 47-yard gain. Oklahoma ran two plays that served to move the ball to the 5 yard line before time expired in the first quarter.

On the first play of the second quarter, Chris Brown ran into the endzone for a Sooner touchdown. Garrett Hartley punched in the extra point to make it 7–3, Oklahoma. Missouri then put together a 14 play drive, but failed to score a touchdown. They had the ball, first and goal, at the Oklahoma 9. Daniel chose to keep the ball and ran it up the middle for an apparent score. However, the officials ruled that when his knee touched the ground, the ball had not broken the plane of the goal line, and the ball was spotted at the 1 yard line. The Sooners' defense then kept the Tigers out of the endzone, ultimately forcing another Wolfert field goal. The score at this point was 7–6, Oklahoma. The Sooners got the ball but could not do anything with it, punting it away from the 50-yard line. Missouri promptly threw three incomplete passes and punted it back to Oklahoma, where it went out of bounds at the 50. Oklahoma passed its way into the redzone on this drive, and then rushed their way into the endzone, ending with a 2-yard play by Chris Brown for the score. Hartley's extra point was good, making the score 14–6, Oklahoma. With 3:06 left in the half, Mizzou pressed down the field, aided by a pass to Martin Rucker for 13 yards, to which an Oklahoma 15 yard facemask penalty was added. The Tigers ended up on the Oklahoma 4 yard line, where Missouri set up for the pass, spreading the Sooners' defense out. This let Chase Daniel easily jog across the goal line for a touchdown. The Tigers decided to go for a two-point conversion and the tie, rather than attempt the almost sure kick and trail by one at the half. The play was a double reverse; Jeremy Maclin ended up with the ball and passed it to Martin Rucker, who was wide open in the endzone. Oklahoma got the ball back with 5 seconds on the clock and took a knee, ending the first half with a score of 14–14.

The teams exchanged punts to start off the third quarter. Missouri pushed down to the Oklahoma 25 before a sack and a penalty pushed them out of field goal range and forced them to give up the ball. Oklahoma then completed a 7 play, 80 yard drive culminating in a 4-yard Allen Patrick touchdown. Hartley's extra point made the score 21–14, Oklahoma. On Mizzou's next possession, Daniel threw the ball on 2nd and 1. The ball was tipped and Curtis Lofton of the Sooners caught it, running it back to the Missouri 7 yard line. This set up a pass to Jermaine Gresham for the touchdown. The PAT made it 28–14 in favor of the Sooners. Missouri was setting up a drive toward the Sooners' endzone when the third quarter ended.

Missouri started off the fourth quarter with an incomplete pass that made it 4th and goal at the Oklahoma 15. Wolfert made his third field goal of the game to make the score 28–17, Oklahoma. The Sooners then drove down the field and, after a couple of redzone plays, Bradford found Joe Jon Finley for the touchdown. Hartley went to 5 of 5 on the night, making the score 35–17, Oklahoma. At this point, the West Virginia Mountaineers had just lost their game to the Pittsburgh Panthers, meaning that the top two teams were in danger of losing. Missouri took the ball and quickly went three-and-out. The Sooners put together a drive in which every play that advanced the ball was a run (Bradford had one incomplete pass), eating over six minutes off of the clock. Oklahoma couldn't get the ball across the goal line, though, and Hartley kicked the 26 yard field goal to make the score 38–17, Sooners. Missouri went three-and-out on their final possession and Oklahoma ran out the clock to win the game. This was Oklahoma's 41st conference championship and fifth Big 12 Championship. Oklahoma won each of their five titles with a different quarterback and is the first and only team in the Big 12 to win consecutive titles.

=== West Virginia (Fiesta Bowl) ===
#11 West Virginia Mountaineers vs. #3 Oklahoma Sooners

Team	1	2	3	4	Total
• #11 West Virginia	6	14	14	14	48
#3 Oklahoma	0	6	9	13	28

- Date: January 2
- Location: University of Phoenix Stadium, Glendale, Arizona
- Game start: 7:00 p.m. CST
- Game attendance: 70,016
- TV announcers (FOX): Matt Vasgersian (Play-by-play), Terry Donahue (Color), Pat Haden (Color) & Laura Okmin (Sideline)

== Rankings ==
Ranking movements Legend: ██ Increase in ranking ██ Decrease in ranking ( ) = First-place votes
	Week															
Poll	Pre	1	2	3	4	5	6	7	8	9	10	11	12	13	14	Final
AP	8	5	3	4	3	10	6	4 (1)	4	5	4	3 (1)	10	9	3 (1)	8
Coaches	8	6	5	4 (1)	4 (4)	10	5	4	4	5	4 (2)	3 (4)	9	8	3 (2)	8
Harris	Not released				3 (1)	9	5	4	4	4	4	3 (9)	9	8	3 (6)	Not released
BCS	Not released							5	6	6	5	4	10	9	4	Not released

== Statistics ==
=== Team ===
	OU	Opp
Points per Game	43.4	18.2
First downs	289	222
Rushing	122	67
Passing	150	141
Penalty	17	14
Rushing Yardage	2,670	1,544
Rushing Attempts	574	462
Avg per Rush	4.7	3.3
Avg. per game	190.7	110.3
Passing yardage	3,615	3,193
Avg. per game	258.2	228.1
Completions–attempts	270-401 (67.3%)	295-489 (60.3%)
Total Offense	5,866	4,212
Total plays	975	951
Avg. per play	6.5	4.7
Avg. per game	451.2	324.0
Fumbles-Lost	16–11	24–9

	OU	Opp
Punts–yards	50–2,124 (42.5 avg)	85–3,508 (41.3 avg)
Punt returns-Total Yards	45-340 (7.6 avg)	23-249 (10.8 avg)
Kick returns-Total Yards	56-1,583 (28.3 avg)	75-1,631 (21.7 avg)
Onside Kicks	0-2 (0%)	0-1 (0%)
Avg Time of Possession per Game	30:07	29:53
Penalties–yards	83–692	86–683
Avg PY per Game	53.2	52.5
3rd down conversions	89/173 (51.4%)	65/198 (32.8%)
4th down conversions	7/16 (43.4%)	10/18 (55.6%)
Sacks By–yards	32-239	14-109
Total TDs	77	28
Rushing	34	17
Passing	39	17
Field goals–attempts	10–12 (83.3%)	13–20 (65%)
PAT–attempts	70–75 (93.3%)	27–27 (100%)
Total attendance	594,005	190,122
Games-Avg. per game	7-84,858	4-47,530

=== Scores by quarter ===
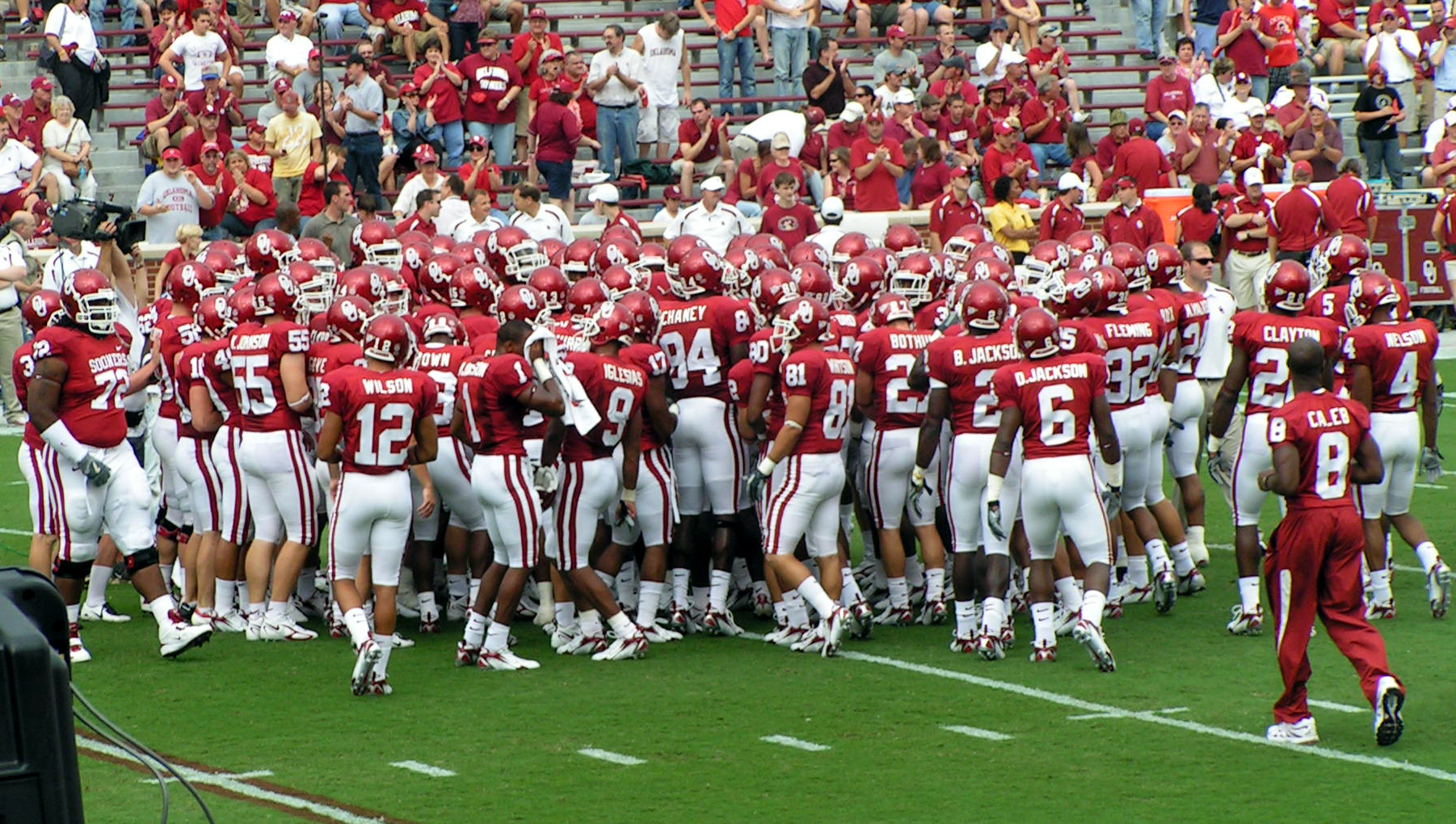
The team huddles together before the start of their game against the Miami Hurricane.

	1	2	3	4	Total
Opponents	54	76	51	55	236
Oklahoma	129	163	126	146	564

== Postseason ==
As the 2007 college football season neared the end, many organizations began to announce finalists and winners of various post-season awards. Duke Robinson was named a semifinalist for the Lombardi Award, given to the nation's best lineman. He was one of 12 athletes recognized. Jermaine Gresham was named one of eight semifinalists for the John Mackey Award for the best tight end. Sam Bradford was named a finalist for the Manning Award, given to the nation's best quarterback. Gerald McCoy was named the Big 12 Defensive Freshman of the Year. Oklahoma also had six players make the All-Conference First Team (the most of any school), six players on the All-Conference Second Team and seven players on the All-Conference Honorable Mention (these selections are made by the 12 [now 10] coaches in the league):

All-Big 12 First Team
- Brody Eldridge, So, FB
- Duke Robinson, Jr, OL
- Auston English, So, DL
- Curtis Lofton, Jr, LB
- Nic Harris, Jr, DB
- Reggie Smith, Jr, DB

All-Big 12 Second Team
- Malcolm Kelly, Jr, WR
- Garrett Hartley, Jr, PK
- Phil Loadholt, Jr, OL
- Brandon Walker, Jr, OL
- DeMarcus Granger, So, DL
- D.J. Wolfe, Sr, DB

All-Big 12 Honorable Mention Team
- Lewis Baker, Sr, LB
- Sam Bradford, Fr, QB
- Joe Jon Finley, Sr, TE
- Jermaine Gresham, So, TE
- Juaquin Iglesias, Jr, WR
- Gerald McCoy, Fr, DL
- DeMarco Murray, Fr, RB

Duke Robinson and Curtis Lofton became Oklahoma's 143rd and 144th All-American when they were voted to the first team by the various NCAA-sanctioned organizations such as American Football Coaches Association, the Associated Press, The Sporting News and the Football Writers Association of America and both were named consensus All-Americans by the NCAA. Curtis Lofton was also named the Big 12 Defensive Player of the Year by the AP. Sam Bradford and Gerald McCory were named to College Football News's Freshman All-America First Team with Bradford also being named Offensive Freshman of the Year while Jermaine Gresham and DeMarcus Granger were named to CFN's Sophomore All-America First Team. Bradford was also named as freshman of the year by The Sporting News.

=== 2008 NFL draft ===
The 2008 NFL draft was held on April 26–27, 2008 at Radio City Music Hall in New York City. The following Oklahoma players were either selected or signed as undrafted free agents following the draft.

Player	Position	Round	Overall pick	NFL team
Curtis Lofton	LB	2nd	37	Atlanta Falcons
Malcolm Kelly	WR	2nd	51	Washington Redskins
Reggie Smith	CB	3rd	75	San Francisco 49ers
Allen Patrick	RB	7th	240	Baltimore Ravens
Garrett Hartley	K	Undrafted		Denver Broncos
Joe Jon Finley	TE	Undrafted		San Francisco 49ers
Lewis Baker	S	Undrafted		San Francisco 49ers
