= Allen Patrick =

American football player (born 1984)

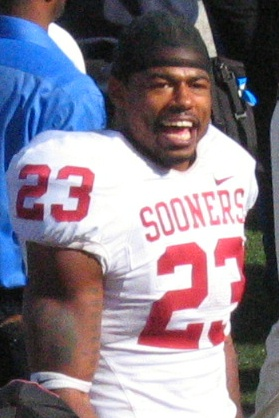
- Patrick with the Oklahoma Sooners in 2006

Profile
- Position: Running back

Personal information
- Born: February 15, 1984 (age 42); Conway, South Carolina, U.S.
- Listed height: 6 ft 1 in (1.85 m)
- Listed weight: 200 lb (91 kg)

Career information
- High school: Conway
- College: Independence (2004); Oklahoma (2005–2007)
- NFL draft: 2008: 7th round, 240th overall pick

Career history
- Baltimore Ravens (2008)*; Cleveland Browns (2008); New York Giants (2009)*; Jacksonville Jaguars (2009–2010)*; Indianapolis Colts (2010)*; St. Louis Rams (2010)*
- * Offseason or practice squad member only

Awards and highlights
- First-team All-KJCCC (2004)
- Stats at Pro Football Reference

Roland Allen Patrick III (born February 15, 1984) is an American former professional football player who was a running back in the National Football League (NFL). He was selected by the Baltimore Ravens in the seventh round of the 2008 NFL draft. He played college football at Oklahoma.

Patrick was also a member of the Cleveland Browns, New York Giants, Jacksonville Jaguars, Indianapolis Colts, and St. Louis Rams.

== Early life ==
Patrick attended Conway High School in Conway, South Carolina where he played running back, defensive back, and kick returner.

== College career ==
=== Independence Community College ===
Following high school, Patrick played for Independence Community College in Independence, Kansas. He played safety.

=== Oklahoma ===
Patrick then transferred to the University of Oklahoma and made the switch to running back. During the 2006 season, he was thrust into the starting lineup when starting tailback Adrian Peterson was lost for the season with a broken collarbone. He gained 761 yards on 169 carries in 2006, with a 4.5 yard-per-carry average and 4 touchdowns. In 2007, with Peterson gone to the NFL, Patrick gained 1,009 yards on 173 attempts and scored 8 touchdowns. Patrick finished his career with 1,906 total rushing yards and 14 rushing touchdowns.

=== Statistics ===
Season	Rushing					Receiving				
Season	Att	Yds	Avg	Lng	TD	Rec	Yds	Avg	Lng	TD
2005	25	136	5.4	28	2	4	8	2.0	12	0
2006	170	766	4.5	65	4	0	0	0.0	0	0
2007	173	1,009	5.8	69	8	10	56	5.6	20	1
Career	368	1,911	5.2	69	14	14	64	4.6	20	1

=== Post career ===
On July 1, 2023, Patrick was arrested and was charged with felony kidnapping of an adult, false imprisonment and aggravated battery.
