= Juaquin Iglesias =

American gridiron football player (born 1987)

No. 17, 84
- Position: Wide receiver

Personal information
- Born: August 22, 1987 (age 39); Killeen, Texas, U.S.
- Listed height: 6 ft 1 in (1.85 m)
- Listed weight: 205 lb (93 kg)

Career information
- High school: Killeen
- College: Oklahoma
- NFL draft: 2009: 3rd round, 99th overall pick

Career history
- Chicago Bears (2009–2010); Minnesota Vikings (2010); Houston Texans (2011–2012)*; Toronto Argonauts (2013)
- * Offseason or practice squad member only

Awards and highlights
- Second-team All-Big 12 (2008)
- Stats at Pro Football Reference
- Stats at CFL.ca (archive)

Juaquin Iglesias (pronounced Hwah-KEEN; born August 22, 1987) is an American former professional football player who was a wide receiver in the National Football League (NFL) and Canadian Football League (CFL). He played college football for the Oklahoma Sooners and was selected by the Chicago Bears in the third round of the 2009 NFL draft.

== Early life ==
Born to Bobby and Bernita Iglesias, his father is a barber shop owner in Temple, Texas. Began playing football for the Boys and Girls Club in Killeen, Texas. As a senior at Killeen High School in Killeen, Texas, Iglesias had 42 catches for 886 yards and 10 touchdowns, and was named first-team all-district (16-4A), under coach Sam Jones. He also ran track and field in the 400, 800, and 1,600 meter relays, and averaged 17 points per game in basketball.

== College career ==
In his first season as a Sooner, 2005, he had 19 receptions for 290 yards. This included his first career touchdown catch at Oklahoma, a 21-yard touchdown-game winner from Rhett Bomar, in a double overtime win against the Baylor Bears, 37–30, on October 22.

In 2006, he had 41 catches for 514 yards. In the 2007 Fiesta Bowl against Boise State, he had a career-high 129 yards receiving, and caught the successful pass on a two-point conversion which allowed OU to tie the game with 1:26 remaining. He achieved a new career high in an Oklahoma victory against the University of Tulsa (62-21), on September 21, 2007, with 8 catches for 142 yards and two touchdowns.

== Professional career ==
=== Pre-draft ===
Pre-draft measurables
Height	Weight	40-yard dash	10-yard split	20-yard split	20-yard shuttle	Three-cone drill	Vertical jump	Broad jump
6 ft 0 7/8 in (1.85 m)	210 lb (95 kg)	4.54 s	1.64 s	2.66 s	4.40 s	7.22 s	34 1/2 in (0.88 m)	9 ft 8 in (2.95 m)
Cone drill from Pro Day, all other values from NFL Combine.

=== Chicago Bears ===
Iglesias was selected in the third round (99th overall pick) of the 2009 NFL draft by the Chicago Bears. He was signed to a four-year contract on June 10, 2009, and was expected to challenge Rashied Davis for the number three spot on the depth chart. During his rookie year he was active for only one game.

=== Minnesota Vikings ===
Iglesias was signed off the Bears practice squad by the Minnesota Vikings in preparation for the Week 17 game against the Detroit Lions.

=== Houston Texans ===
The Houston Texans signed Iglesias to their practice squad during the 2012 preseason. On August 31, 2012, Iglesias was released by the Texans as a part of final roster cuts.

=== Toronto Argonauts ===
On February 21, 2013, Iglesias was signed by the Toronto Argonauts of the Canadian Football League. During the 2013 CFL season, Iglesias recorded three receptions for 65 yards. On September 25, Iglesias was released by the Argonauts.

=== Helsinki Wolverines ===
On February 6, 2013, the Helsinki Wolverines signed Iglesias alongside Columbus Givens III, who Iglesias played with at Killeen High School.
