= Emily Jones =

American reporter

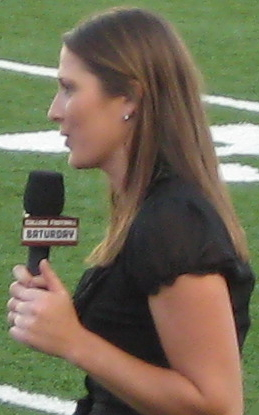
- Emily Jones reporting for the sidelines at Jones AT&T Stadium in 2008
- Born: Houston, Texas, U.S.
- Occupation: Sportscaster

Emily Jones McCoy is a former television anchor and reporter for Rangers Sports Network.

Jones graduated from Texas Tech University in 1998 with a Bachelor of Arts degree in broadcast journalism.

She covered Big 12 Conference college football and did sideline reporting and live pre- and postgame shows for the Dallas Mavericks, San Antonio Spurs, Houston Rockets, Texas Rangers, and Houston Astros. In January 2007, Jones became host of the show Big 12 Showcase when Bill Land departed to become FSN Southwest's play-by-play announcer for the San Antonio Spurs. Additionally, she portrayed a reporter in two television series: Friday Night Lights, and Dallas.

Jones is married to Fort Worth mortgage banker Mike McCoy. Jones legally changed her name to Emily Jones McCoy incorporating her maiden name Jones in place of Catherine. She left Fox Sports in November 2013 to devote more time to her family before rejoining the following year as a sideline reporter for the Texas Rangers. In 2015, she accidentally received a Gatorade shower meant for Josh Hamilton. On March 12, 2026 Jones announced she was stepping down from her reporting duties with the Texas Rangers prior to the start of the 2026 MLB Baseball regular season.
