= Malcolm Kelly =

American football player and coach (born 1986)

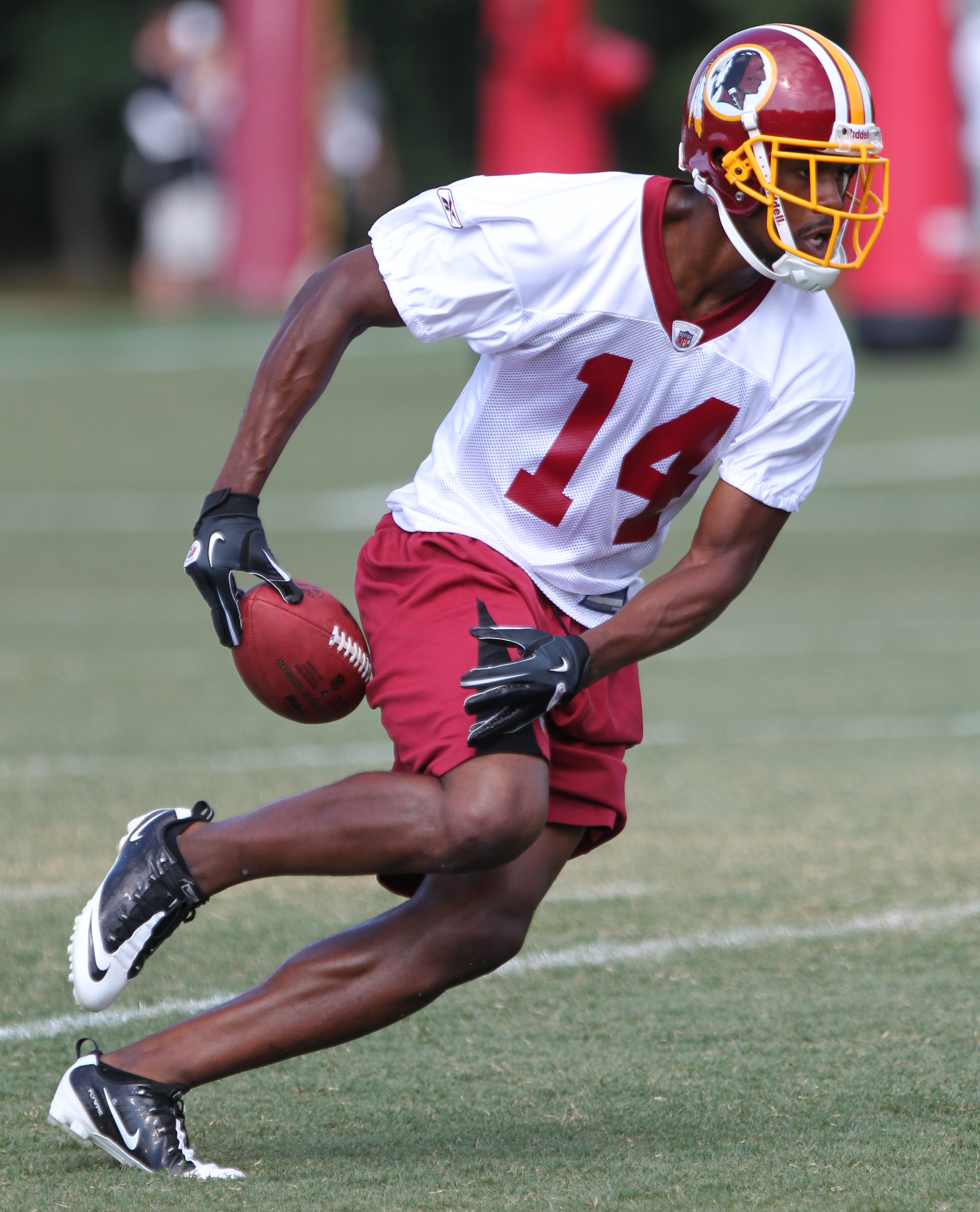
- Kelly during Redskins training camp in 2011

TCU Horned Frogs
- Title: Assistant head coach & wide receivers coach

Personal information
- Born: December 30, 1986 (age 39); Longview, Texas, U.S.
- Listed height: 6 ft 4 in (1.93 m)
- Listed weight: 226 lb (103 kg)

Career information
- High school: Longview
- College: Oklahoma (2005–2007)
- NFL draft: 2008: 2nd round, 51st overall pick

Career history

Playing
- Washington Redskins (2008–2010)

Coaching
- Houston (2017–2018) Offensive analyst; TCU (2019–2021) Wide receivers coach; TCU (2022–present) Assistant head coach & wide receivers coach

Awards and highlights
- Freshman All-American (2005); Big 12 All-Freshman (2005); First-team All-Big 12 (2007); Second-team All-Big 12 (2006)

Career NFL statistics
- Receptions: 28
- Receiving yards: 365
- Stats at Pro Football Reference

Malcolm Xavier Kelly (born December 30, 1986) is an American football coach and former wide receiver who played in the National Football League (NFL). He was selected in the second round (51st overall) of the 2008 NFL draft by the Washington Redskins. He played college football at the University of Oklahoma.

== Early life ==
Kelly attended Longview High School in Longview, Texas. He was a three-time all-district first-team selection at wide receiver and was also named First-team all-state his final two years in 2003 and 2004. Kelly caught 29 passes for 638 yards and nine touchdowns as a senior, as well as 27 passes for 826 yards and six touchdowns as a junior.

Kelly was ranked the sixth best wide receiver in the nation by both Rivals.com and Scout.com, behind Patrick Turner and DeSean Jackson among others.

== College career ==
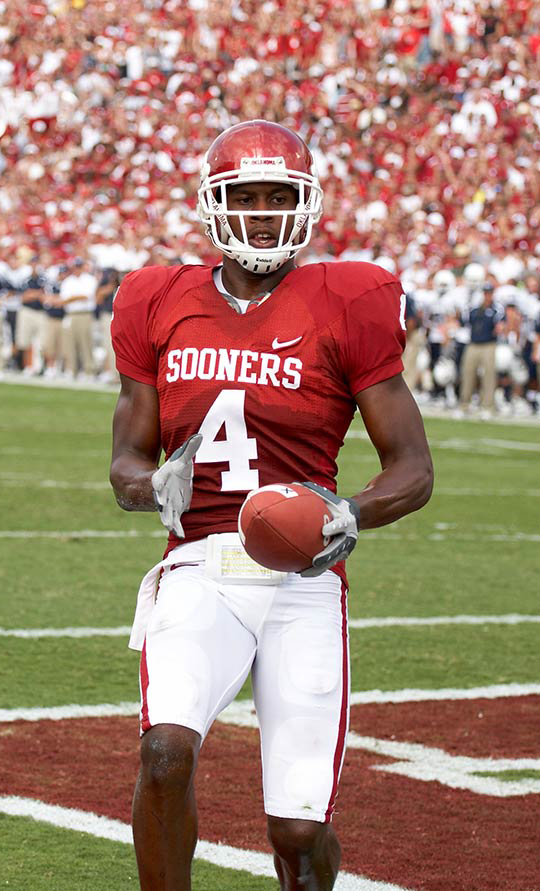
Kelly while playing with the Oklahoma Sooners.

Playing as a true freshman in the 2005 season, Kelly led the Sooners in receptions and receiving yards. He had a season-high eight receptions at Nebraska, and hauled in five passes for a season-best 118 yards against Texas A&M. He became the fourth freshman in OU history to lead the team in receiving, the first since 1975.

Kelly was named to The Sporting News Freshman All-American Team and All-Big 12 Freshman Team. He also received an All-Big 12 honorable mention (Big 12 Coaches). Kelly ranks No. 4 at Oklahoma for receiving yards by a freshman, No. 5 for receptions by a freshman.

In his 19th career game at Oklahoma, Kelly became the fastest player in Sooners history to reach 1,000 career receiving yards. During the 2006 season he led the Sooners in receptions, receiving yards and touchdown catches. In a game against Texas Tech he tied the school record with 11 receptions. He also went over 100 receiving yards in five games with a best of 164 versus Middle Tennessee. He was named MVP of the Big 12 Championship Game.

After only two seasons with the Sooners, Kelly made it to eleventh on the all-time career receiving list with 1,464 yards. He also has the second most receiving yards in a season in OU's history with 993 yards, behind Mark Clayton's 1,425 yards. He also led Oklahoma to the Big 12 championship. He scored ten touchdowns in his junior Campaign.

Kelly suffered a knee injury early in the 2007 Fiesta Bowl and missed most of the game.

Kelly began the 2007 season with a great game against North Texas, receiving for over 150 yards in a 79–10 victory. A week later he recorded 102 yards and three touchdowns receiving as the Sooners beat the Miami Hurricanes 51–13. In his junior season he ranked second on the Sooners, grabbing 49 passes for 821 yards (16.8-yard average) and nine touchdowns.

After being injured in the Fiesta Bowl, Kelly did not work out at the NFL Combine. On pro day at Oklahoma on April 9, 2008, Kelly ran a disappointing 4.75 and 4.68 in the 40 yard dash. Afterward, the Oklahoma coaching staff acknowledged a last-minute change in the venue and turf—players must wear appropriate shoes for a given surface. Kelly claimed, [and Oklahoma denied with little effort towards a second opinion], his injury was misdiagnosed by the Oklahoma staff. Kelly benched 225 15 times. Kelly's short shuttle was 4.15 with a 6.83 cone drill. He was thrown 22 passes from stand-in QB Eric Crouch and caught 21.

== Professional career ==
Pre-draft measurables
Height	Weight	40-yard dash	10-yard split	20-yard split	20-yard shuttle	Three-cone drill	Vertical jump	Broad jump	Wonderlic
6 ft 4 in (1.93 m)	218 lb (99 kg)	4.68 s	1.62 s	2.73 s	4.24 s	7.00 s	32 in (0.81 m)	9 ft 9 in (2.97 m)	22
Measurements were taken at Pro Day.

Kelly was selected by the Washington Redskins in the second round (51st overall) of the 2008 NFL draft. On July 14, he signed a four-year, $3.36 million contract with $1.655 million guaranteed. However, due to injuries Kelly was inactive for three of the first five games of his rookie season. He appeared in only five games his first year, catching three passes for 18 yards.

Kelly played 16 games in 2009 recording 25 receptions for 347 yards. Kelly spent the entire 2010 season on injured reserve with a knee injury.

On August 30, 2011, Kelly was released with an injury settlement.

== Post-playing career ==
On February 21, 2017, it was announced that Kelly joined the University of Houston's football program as an offensive graduate assistant.

On March 4, 2019, it was announced that Kelly joined the Texas Christian University's football program as an outside wide-receiver coach.
