= Auston English =

American gridiron football player (born 1987)

No. 49, 94, 55
- Position: Defensive end

Personal information
- Born: March 10, 1987 (age 39); Edinburgh, Scotland
- Listed height: 6 ft 3 in (1.91 m)
- Listed weight: 250 lb (113 kg)

Career information
- High school: Canadian (TX)
- College: Oklahoma
- NFL draft: 2010: undrafted

Career history
- Cleveland Browns (2010)*; Hartford Colonials (2010); Cleveland Browns (2011−2012); Toronto Argonauts (2013)
- * Offseason or practice squad member only

Awards and highlights
- First-team All-Big 12 (2007)

Career NFL statistics
- Total tackles: 4
- Stats at Pro Football Reference

Auston English (born March 10, 1987) is a former American football defensive end.

On April 30, 2010, English was signed as an undrafted free agent by the Cleveland Browns.

On September 4, 2011, English was waived by the Cleveland Browns. On September 5, 2011, he was signed to the Browns' practice squad.

On August 3, 2013, English was signed by the Toronto Argonauts of the Canadian Football League. In 4 games with the Argonauts, English recorded 8 tackles. English was released by the Argonauts on October 27, 2013.
