= 2007 Texas Longhorns football team =

American college football season

2007 Texas Longhorns football

Holiday Bowl champion

Holiday Bowl, W 52–34 vs. Arizona State
- Conference: Big 12 Conference
- South

Ranking
- Coaches: No. 10
- AP: No. 10
- Record: 10–3 (5–3 Big 12)
- Head coach: Mack Brown (10th season)
- Offensive coordinator: Greg Davis (10th season)
- Offensive scheme: Spread
- Co-defensive coordinators: Duane Akina (3rd season); Larry Mac Duff (1st season)
- Base defense: 4–3
- Home stadium: Darrell K Royal–Texas Memorial Stadium (Capacity: 85,123)

2007 Big 12 Conference football standings
	Conf.			Overall
Team	W		L	W		L
North Division
No. 4 Missouri xy	7	–	1	12	–	2
No. 7 Kansas x%	7	–	1	12	–	1
Colorado	4	–	4	6	–	7
Kansas State	3	–	5	5	–	7
Nebraska	2	–	6	5	–	7
Iowa State	2	–	6	3	–	9
South Division
No. 8 Oklahoma xy$	6	–	2	11	–	3
No. 10 Texas	5	–	3	10	–	3
No. 22 Texas Tech	4	–	4	9	–	4
Oklahoma State	4	–	4	7	–	6
Texas A&M	4	–	4	7	–	6
Baylor	0	–	8	3	–	9
Championship: Oklahoma 38, Missouri 17
$ – BCS representative as conference champion; % – BCS at-large representative; x – Division champion/co-champions; y – Championship game participant; Rankings from AP Poll

The 2007 Texas Longhorns football team (variously "Texas" or "UT" or the "Horns") represented the University of Texas at Austin in the 2007 NCAA Division I FBS football season. The team was coached by Mack Brown. The Longhorns played their home games in Darrell K Royal–Texas Memorial Stadium (DKR).

The Longhorns entered the 2007 season ranked third on all-time college football lists in both total wins and winning percentage. A pre-season ranking by ESPN writer Mark Schlabach had the Longhorns ranked eighth, while College Football News ranked Texas third. The Longhorns came into the season ranked fourth in both the Coaches Poll and AP Poll. During the preceding summer five players had been disciplined for legal infractions, another suspended for NCAA rule violations, and a coach had undergone surgery for cancer. Additional players were suspended during the season.

The Longhorns played games against two opponents they had never faced previously: Arkansas State University and the University of Central Florida (UCF). The Longhorns narrowly achieved a victory in their home opener with Arkansas State, and in their first road game of the season, Texas was the inaugural opponent for the UCF Knights in their new stadium. In preseason speculation, games against Texas Christian University (TCU) and Oklahoma (OU) were considered among the top 20 games to watch during the 2007 college football season.

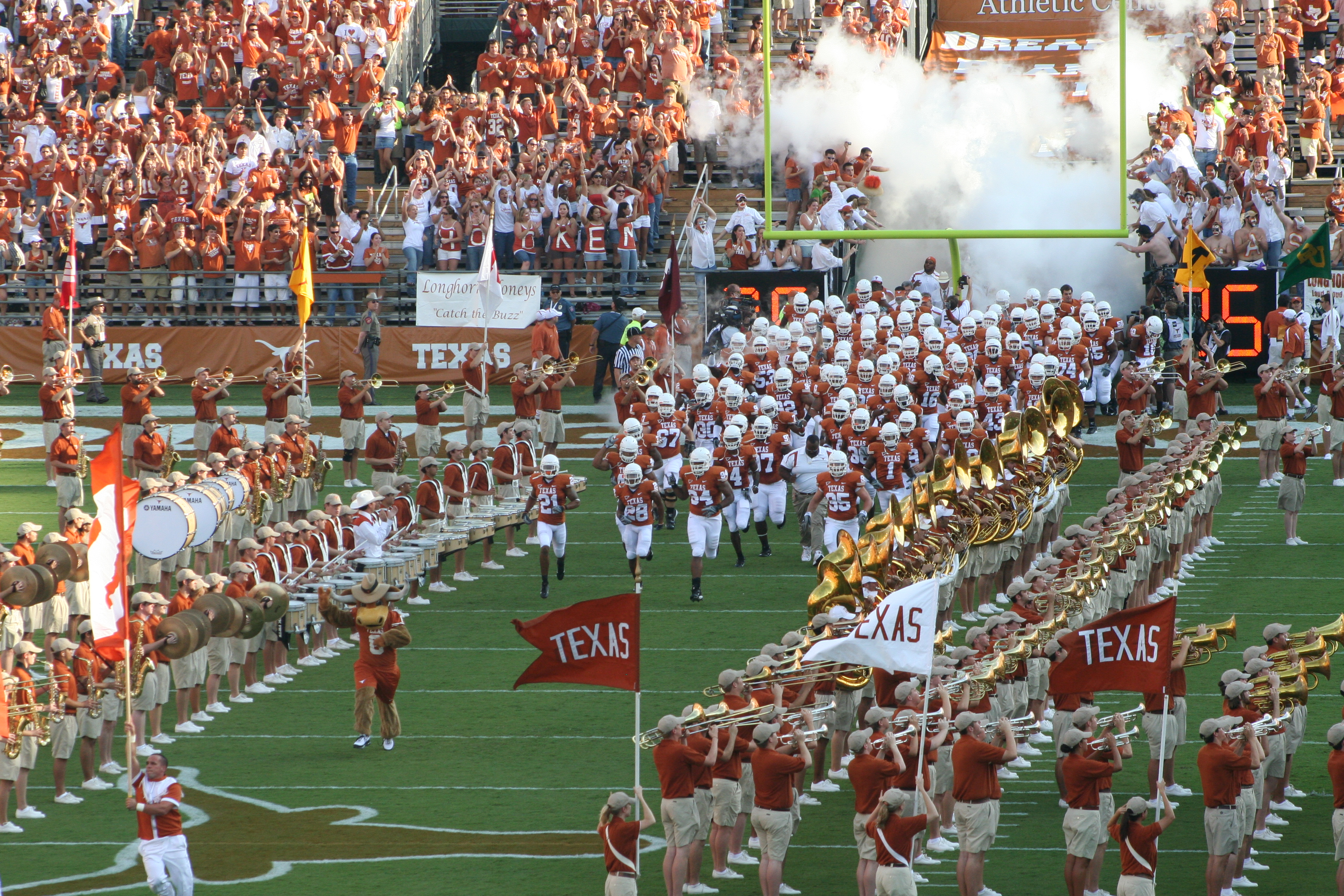
The 2007 Longhorns take the field on opening day against Arkansas State.

The Longhorns lost conference games to the Kansas State Wildcats, the Oklahoma Sooners, and the Texas A&M Aggies. In two close games, they avoided upset attempts by lower-ranked Nebraska and Oklahoma State, the latter game involving a 21-point fourth quarter comeback by the Horns. Texas concluded its season by winning the 2007 Holiday Bowl against the Arizona State Sun Devils—another first-time opponent for Texas—bringing their season record to 10–3.

The Horns finished the season ranked tenth in the AP poll and in the USA Today coaches poll. After the season, five UT players entered professional football through the 2008 NFL draft and four others agreed to sign free-agent contracts with NFL teams.

== Before the 2007 season ==
Mack Brown became the head coach of the Texas Longhorns for the 1998 season. Through 2006, he had a win–loss record of 93–22 and the best winning percentage (80.9%) of any football coach in Longhorn history. The 2004 team had the first Bowl Championship Series win for any Texas team and the 2005 team won the National Championship (the fourth for the UT football program).

The 2006 team had 9 wins and 1 loss through November 4, 2006 but starting quarterback Colt McCoy was injured in the 11th game and Texas lost the final two regular season games, including a 12–7 home loss to division rivals Texas A&M. This took the team out of contention for the conference championship, as well as the national championship.

Between the 2006 regular season and the bowl season, back-up quarterback Jevan Snead transferred to another school, and Longhorn defensive coordinator Gene Chizik accepted the head-coaching job at Iowa State University. The Longhorns ended up accepting a bowl invitation to the Alamo Bowl against the unranked University of Iowa Hawkeyes, who had finished in eighth place in the Big Ten Conference. Colt McCoy was cleared to play for the Horns and led Texas through a back-and-forth affair to a 26–24 win. The Longhorns finished the season with a record of 10 wins and 3 losses and received a final ranking of 13th in the nation by both the Associated Press AP Poll and the USA Today Coaches Poll

Texas entered the 2007 season ranked third in the all-time list of both total wins and winning percentage. They were ranked in the Top 10 by numerous pre-season polls. For instance, a pre-season ranking by ESPN writer Mark Schlabach had the Longhorns ranked eighth; Rivals.com ranked them ninth; College Football News and Real Football 365 both ranked Texas third. The Longhorns came into the season ranked fourth in both the Coaches Poll and AP Poll.

=== Facilities and equipment ===
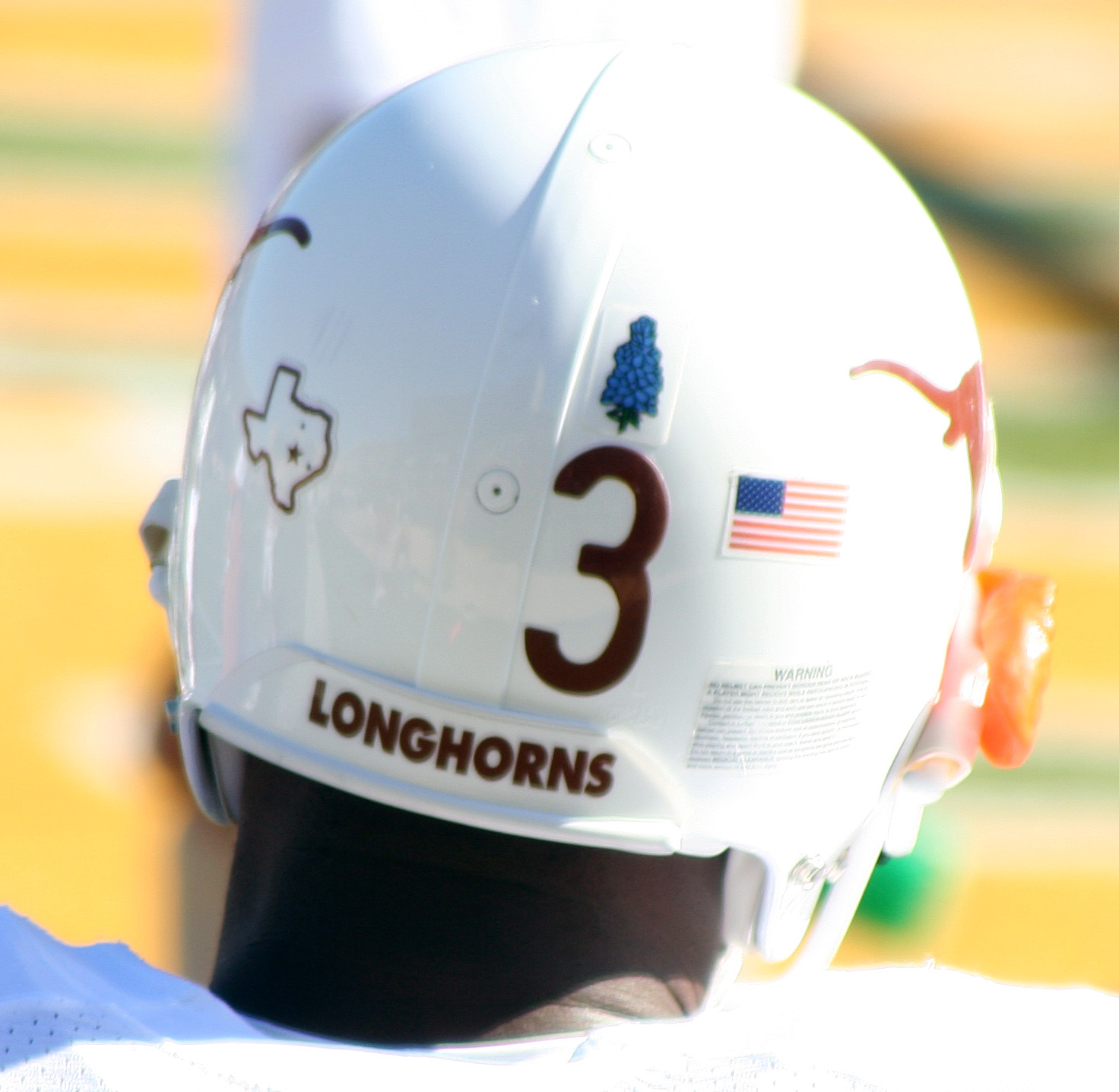
The Texas bluebonnet decal honored President Lyndon B. Johnson and his family.

Following the final home game of 2006, construction workers demolished the north end of Darrell K Royal-Texas Memorial Stadium. This section was rebuilt to make the lowest seats closer to the field while planning for luxury boxes and an upper-deck. The lower deck was ready for 2007, while the upper deck and luxury boxes are planned to be ready for 2008. The modifications put the north end zone seats thirty yards closer to the field of play. This results in several game day changes, such as Smokey the Cannon moving to the south end-zone near Bevo.

Each 2007 Longhorn football helmet featured a Texas bluebonnet decal. The decal was chosen to honor President Lyndon B. Johnson, Lady Bird Johnson and the Johnson family. Brown said President Johnson used to enjoy discussing football with former UT coach Darrell K Royal, while the first lady was known for her conservation efforts, particularly the spread of native wildflowers.

For the second straight year, UT merchandise products were the top-selling products among clients of Collegiate Licensing Company. UT entered into a marketing arrangement with Bluetooth SIG to deploy Bluetooth kiosks throughout the stadium. These kiosks broadcast free game-day information to Bluetooth-enabled cell-phones in the stands.

=== Practices and preseason injuries ===
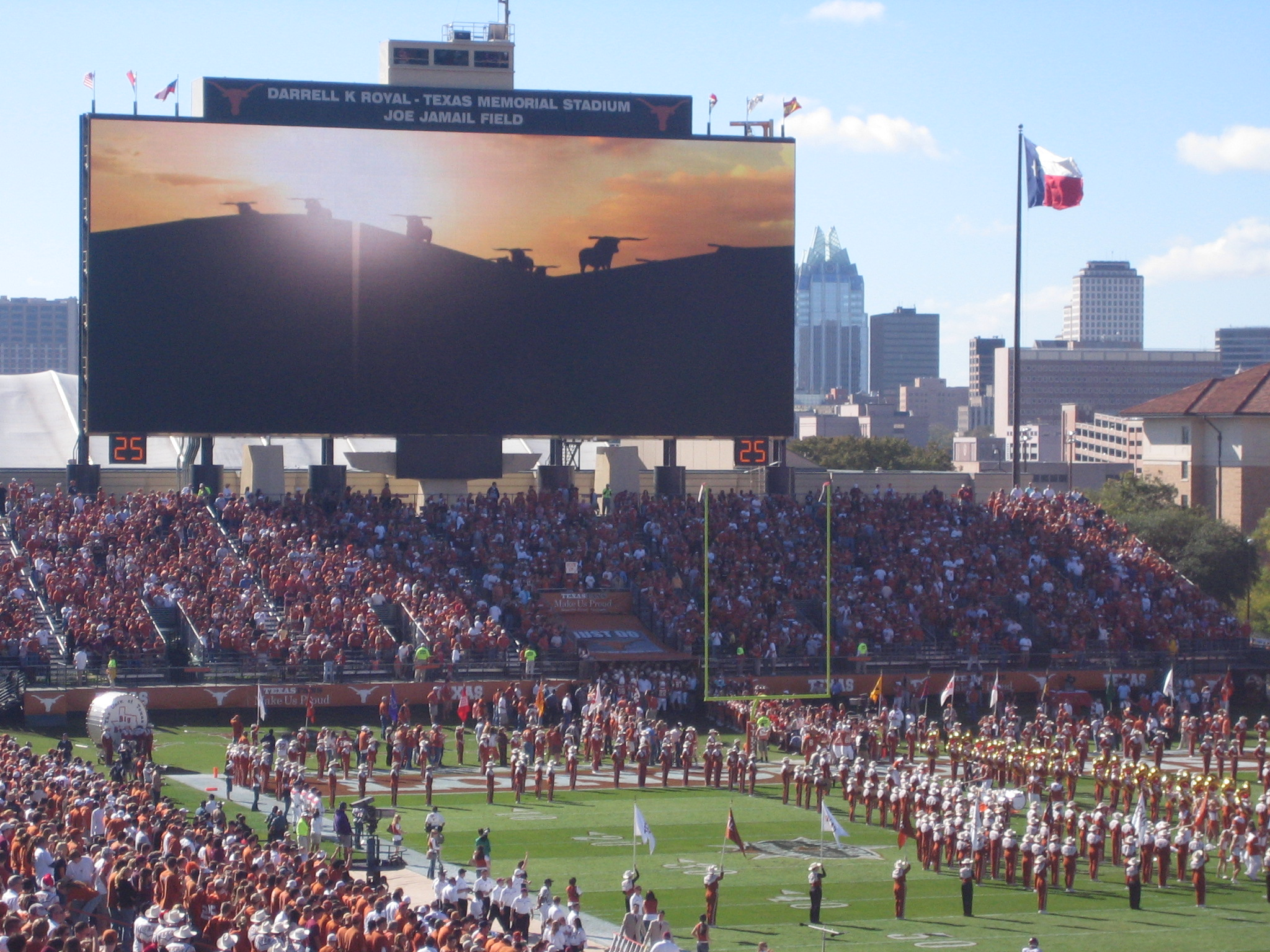
The Godzillatron scoreboard at Darrell K Royal-Texas Memorial Stadium, home of the Longhorns, with the Austin skyline in the background (2006).

The Longhorns played their 2007 Spring Jamboree Scrimmage on March 31, 2007 and reported for fall practice on August 5, 2007. A public scrimmage scheduled for August 18, 2007 was canceled due to safety concerns related to the weather and to ongoing stadium construction. With rain expected over the weekend and no working pumps to help remove water from the field, Brown held a closed practice indoors instead.

During fall practice, receivers Limas Sweed, Billy Pittman, and Jordan Shipley were injured. Sweed suffered a sprain to his left wrist on August 15. Pittman sprained his left shoulder during practice on August 17. Head UT athletic trainer Kenny Boyd said, "We will continue to evaluate [Pittman] and monitor his progress in hopes of getting him back in time for the season opener." Jordan Shipley had to limit his practice due to a strained hamstring. The receiver position was considered one of the deepest positions on the team; coaches said veteran players Quan Cosby (Texas' second-leading receiver) and Nate Jones performed well in training camp. Coach Brown said he expected to be able to play three freshman receivers in 2007: Brandon Collins, Malcolm Williams and James Kirkendoll. On August 29, 2006, Brown announced that Sweed was "probable" for the season opening game, but that Shipley was "doubtful".

=== Coaches ===
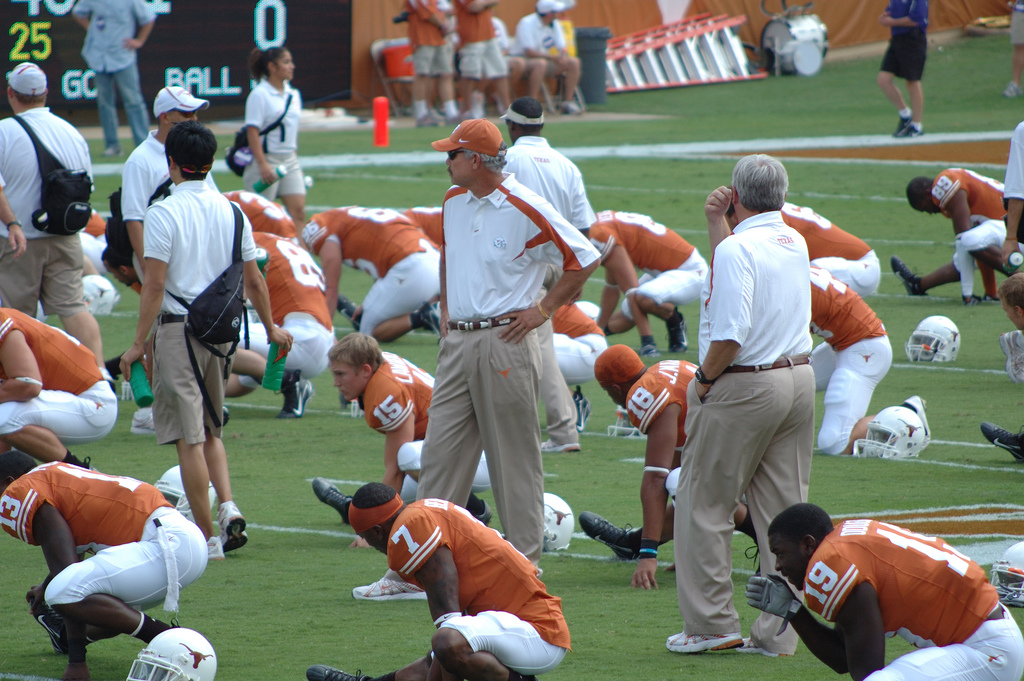
Duane Akina (center), Texas defensive coordinator

Prior to the first game of the season, the University of Texas Board of Regents voted unanimously to raise Brown's salary by $300,000, bringing his annual compensation to $2.81 million and keeping him among the five highest-paid coaches in college football. The package also includes up to $3 million in bonuses, including "$100,000 if he wins the Big 12 Championship and $450,000 for a national championship, as well as bonuses based on the percent of players who graduate." At the time, Brown's contract extended through the 2016 season and included buy-out clauses should another school attempt to hire Brown.

Greg Davis, who entered his 10th season with Texas, was the team's offensive coordinator and quarterbacks coach. Duane Akina was the defensive coordinator, and took the position vacated by Gene Chizik when he left the program. During the 2007 season, Akina performed his job on the sidelines while Larry Mac Duff provided input from the press box. UT running backs coach Ken Rucker announced in August that he had prostate cancer and that he would have surgery on August 27. He coached practices until just prior to surgery and returned to the team before the end of the season. Rucker's health concern coincided with player incidents that created Brown's most tumultuous off-season since arriving at Texas.

=== Player suspensions ===
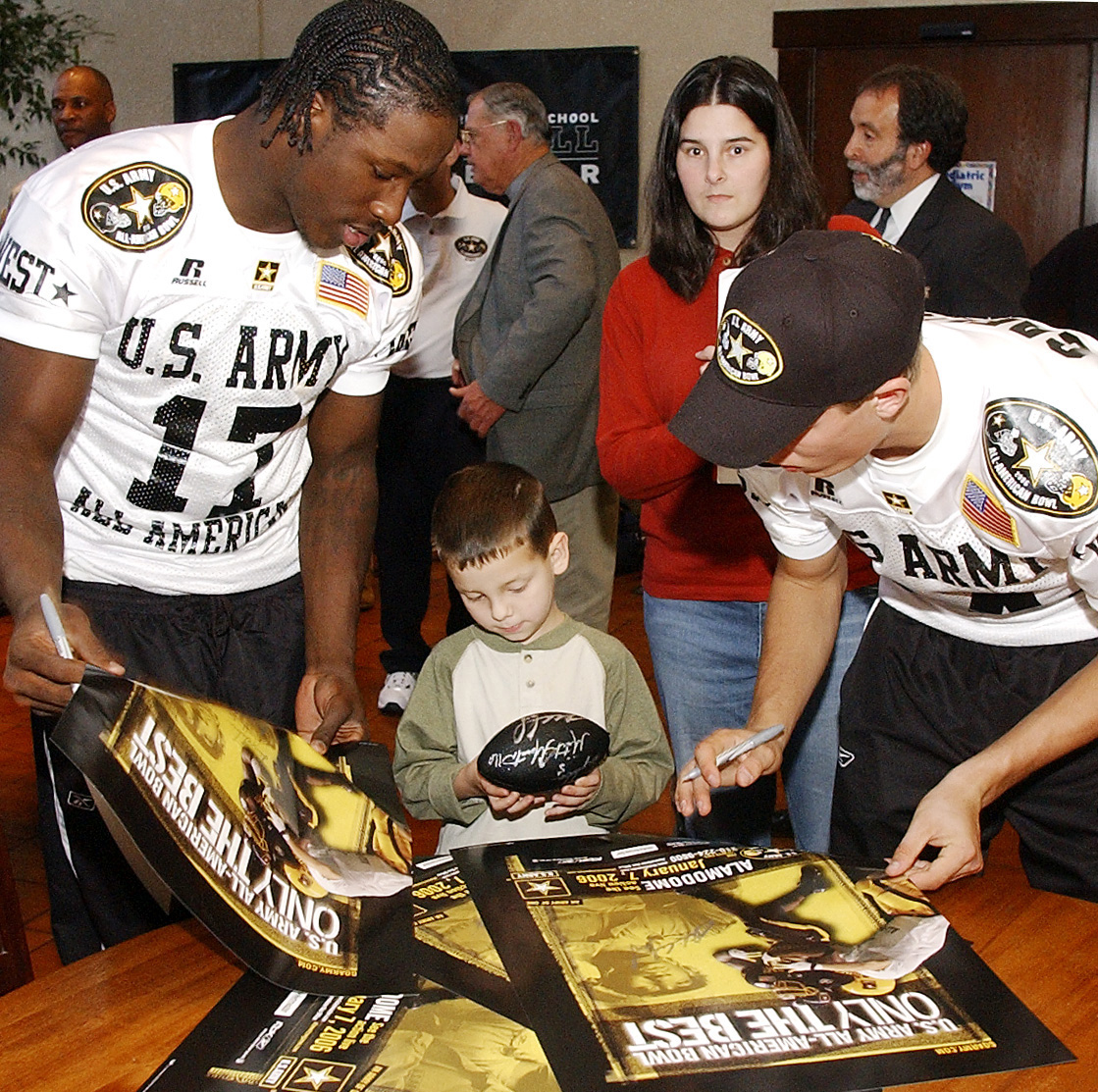
Sergio Kindle (left) and Chris Caflisch signing autographs for children from the Warm Springs Rehabilitation Center in San Antonio.

The school suspended a total of seven players for at least a portion of the season. Six were suspended for alleged illegal activities, and one was suspended for a violation of National Collegiate Athletic Association (NCAA) rules. Defensive end Henry Melton and linebacker Sergio Kindle were both arrested during the summer on charges of driving while intoxicated. Freshman defensive tackle Andre (Dre) Jones (who had not yet played for Texas but did join spring practices) and former UT player Robert Joseph were charged with aggravated robbery with a deadly weapon. Jones was one of the team's most highly touted recruits; his high school football career honors included Prep All-American, three-time all-state selection, first-team All-American by Parade Magazine, and Texas 4A Defensive Player of the Year by the Texas Sports Writers Association The university suspended Tyrell Gatewood indefinitely after he was arrested on two drug possession charges. James Henry was arrested on third-degree felony charges of "obstruction or retaliation and tampering or fabricating physical evidence."

The University of Texas suspended Billy Pittman for three games because he violated NCAA rules when he accepted the use of a friend's car over the summer. Coach Brown and University of Texas President William Charles Powers Jr. issued statements concerning the importance of team discipline and zero tolerance policy for infractions.

== Schedule ==
Date	Time	Opponent	Rank	Site	TV	Result	Attendance	Source
September 1	6:00 p.m.	Arkansas State*	No. 4	Darrell K Royal–Texas Memorial Stadium; Austin, TX	FSN PPV	W 21–13	84,440	
September 8	6:00 p.m.	No. 19 TCU*	No. 7	Darrell K Royal–Texas Memorial Stadium; Austin, TX (rivalry)	FSN	W 34–13	84,621	
September 15	2:30 p.m.	at UCF*	No. 6	Bright House Networks Stadium; Orlando, FL	ESPN2	W 35–32	45,622	
September 22	6:00 p.m.	Rice*	No. 7	Darrell K Royal–Texas Memorial Stadium; Austin, TX (rivalry)	FSN	W 58–14	84,571	
September 29	2:30 p.m.	Kansas State	No. 7	Darrell K Royal–Texas Memorial Stadium; Austin, TX	ABC	L 21–41	84,864	
October 6	2:30 p.m.	vs. No. 10 Oklahoma	No. 19	Cotton Bowl; Dallas, TX (Red River Rivalry)	ABC	L 21–28	80,000	
October 13	11:30 a.m.	at Iowa State	No. 23	Jack Trice Stadium; Ames, IA	FSN	W 56–3	52,060	
October 20	11:30 a.m.	at Baylor	No. 19	Floyd Casey Stadium; Waco, TX (rivalry)	Versus	W 31–10	41,335	
October 27	2:30 p.m.	Nebraska	No. 17	Darrell K Royal–Texas Memorial Stadium; Austin, TX	ABC	W 28–25	85,968	
November 3	2:30 p.m.	at Oklahoma State	No. 14	Boone Pickens Stadium; Stillwater, OK	ABC	W 38–35	41,406	
November 10	2:30 p.m.	Texas Tech	No. 15	Darrell K Royal–Texas Memorial Stadium; Austin, TX (rivalry)	ABC	W 59–43	86,401	
November 23	2:30 p.m.	at Texas A&M	No. 13	Kyle Field; College Station, TX (rivalry)	ABC	L 30–38	88,253	
December 27	7:00 p.m.	vs. No. 12 Arizona State*	No. 17	Qualcomm Stadium; San Diego, CA (Holiday Bowl)	ESPN	W 52–34	64,020	
*Non-conference game; Rankings from AP Poll released prior to the game; All times are in Central time

== Players ==
=== Roster ===
(as of August 5, 2007)
Quarterbacks: 7 John Chiles -Fr.-HS; 11 G. J. Kinne -Fr.-HS; 12 Colt McCoy -So-1L; 14 Freddy Torres* -Sr.-SQ; 15 Trevor Walker* -Fr.-RS; 16 Gilbert Zepeda* -Sr.-SQ; 17 Sherrod Harris -Fr.-RS; Running backs: 2 Vondrell McGee -Fr.-RS; Tyrone Ivy jr -Fr . HS; 3 Chris Ogbonnaya -Jr.-1L; 22 Foswhitt Whittaker -Fr.-HS; 23 Jaime Carvajal* -Sr.-SQ; 24 Antwan Cobb -Fr.-RS; 25 Jamaal Charles -Jr.-2L; 26 Stephen Lane* -Sr.-SQ; 30 James Henry -Fr.-RS; 31 Cody Johnson -Fr.-HS; Full backs: 35 Todd Bondy* -Sr.-SQ; 40 Alex Spears* -Jr.-SQ; 45 Nic Redwine -Jr.-SQ; 46 Drew Marcantonio* -So.-SQ; 49 Luke Tiemann* -Jr.-1L	Wide receivers: 1 Philip Payne -Fr.-RS; 4 Limas Sweed -Sr.-3L; 5 Billy Pittman -Sr.-2L; 6 Quan Cosby -Jr.-2L; 8 Jordan Shipley -Jr.-1L; 9 Nate Jones -Sr.-3L; 10 James Kirkendoll -Fr.-HS; 14 Montre Webber -Fr.-RS; 80 Daniel Orr* -Sr.-SQ; 81 C.A. Vergari* -So.-SQ; 82 Coy Aune* -Sr.-SQ; 89 Malcolm Williams -Fr.-HS; Tight ends: 16 Jermichael Finley -So.-1L; 18 Josh Marshall -Fr.-RS; 19 Blaine Irby -Fr.-HS; 12 Bart Berry – Sr.- 2L; 34 Kevin Hardin -So.-1L; 83 Greg Smith -Fr.-RS; 84 Ian Harris -Fr.-HS; 86 Lucas Hampton-Jr.-2L; 88 Mac McWhorter* -So.-1L; 89 William Ruefle* -Jr.-TR; Offensive guards: 52 Charlie Tanner -So.-1L; 55 Cedric Dockery -Jr.-2L; 68 Drew Oldis* -So.-SQ; 71 Chris Hall -So.-1L; 75 Steve Moore -Fr.-RS; Offensive tackles: 72 Britt Mitchell -Fr.-RS; 74 Adam Ulatoski -So.-1L; 79 Tony Hills -Sr.-3L	Offensive Line (unspecified): 00 Matt Nader -Fr.-HS; 56 Tray Allen -Fr.-HS; 57 Andrew Carroll* -Fr.-HS; 63 Michael Huey -Fr.-HS; 64 Kyle Hix -Fr.-HS; 76 Aundre McGaskey -Fr.-HS; Centers: 54 Michael Taylor* -Sr.-SQ; 66 Buck Burnette -Fr.-RS; 67 Dallas Griffin -Sr.-2L; Defensive ends: 32 Eddie Jones -Fr.-RS; 36 Lamarr Houston -So.-1L; 37 Henry Melton -Jr.-2L; 52 Cory Michner* -Jr.-SQ; 81 Sam Acho -Fr.-HS; 82 Ahmard Howard -Fr.-HS; 85 Russell Carter -Fr.-HS; 95 Aaron Lewis -Jr.-2L; 98 Brian Orakpo -Jr.-2L; Defensive tackles: 55 Rene Hinojosa* -So.-SQ; 72 Michael Wilcoxon -Fr.-HS; 90 Brian Ellis -Fr.-RS; 91 Tyrell Higgins -Fr.-HS; 92 Ben Alexander -So.-1L; 93 Dre Jones -Fr.-HS; 94 Thomas Marshall -Sr.-2L; 96 Derek Lokey -Sr.-3L; 97 Frank Okam -Sr.-3L; 99 Roy Miller -Jr.-2L	Linebackers: 2 Sergio Kindle -So.-1L; 40 Robert Killebrew -Sr.-3L; 10 Keenan Robinson -Fr.-HS; 11 Jared Norton -So.-1L; 33 Scott Derry -Sr.-2L; 38 Roddrick Muckelroy -So.-1L; 42 Dustin Earnest -Fr.-RS; 44 Rashad Bobino -Jr.-2L; 48 Jarrod Ochoa* -So.-HS; 59 Chad Kugler* -So.-SQ; Cornerbacks: 3 Corry Brown -SR.-HS; 8 Terrance Sanders -Sr.-3L; 13 Ryan Palmer -Jr.-2L; 23 Brandon Collins -Fr.-HS; 28 Brandon Foster -Sr.-2L; 12 Earl Thomas -Fr.-HS; Safeties: 1 Tyrell Gatewood -Sr.-2L; 4 Drew Kelson -Sr.-3L; 6 Christian Scott -Fr.-HS; 19 Ishie Oduegwu -So.-1L; 21 Michael Flath* -Sr.-SQ; 21 Erick Jackson -Sr.-2L; 26 Marcus Griffin -Sr.-3L; Defensive backs (unspecified): 5 Ben Wells -Fr.-HS; 7 Deon Beasley -So.-1L; 24 Ryan Moench* -Sr.-SQ; 27 Martin Egwuagu* -So.-HS; 29 Jorge Martinez* -Fr.-HS; 30 Chris Wieland* -So.-SQ; 33 James Allensworth* -So.-SQ; 37 Lawrence Howard* -So.-SQ	Kickoffs: 15 Hunter Lawrence -So.-1L; Place kickers: 39 Ryan Bailey* -Jr.-1L; Punters: 17 Trevor Gerland -So.-SQ; 43 Justin Moore* -Jr.-SQ; 47 John Gold* -So.-SQ; Long snappers: 58 William Harvey* -So.-SQ; 87 Matt Hartle* -Sr.-SQ; Key The abbreviations indicate amount of experience: Fr.-HS = True freshman; Fr.-RS = Redshirt freshman; So. = Sophomore; Jr. = Junior; Sr. = Senior; 1L, 2L, 3L means the player has lettered; for 1, 2, or 3 years, respectively.: SQ indicates that the player has not lettered.; An * indicates that the player is a "walk-on". (a non-scholarship player)

=== Watch lists ===
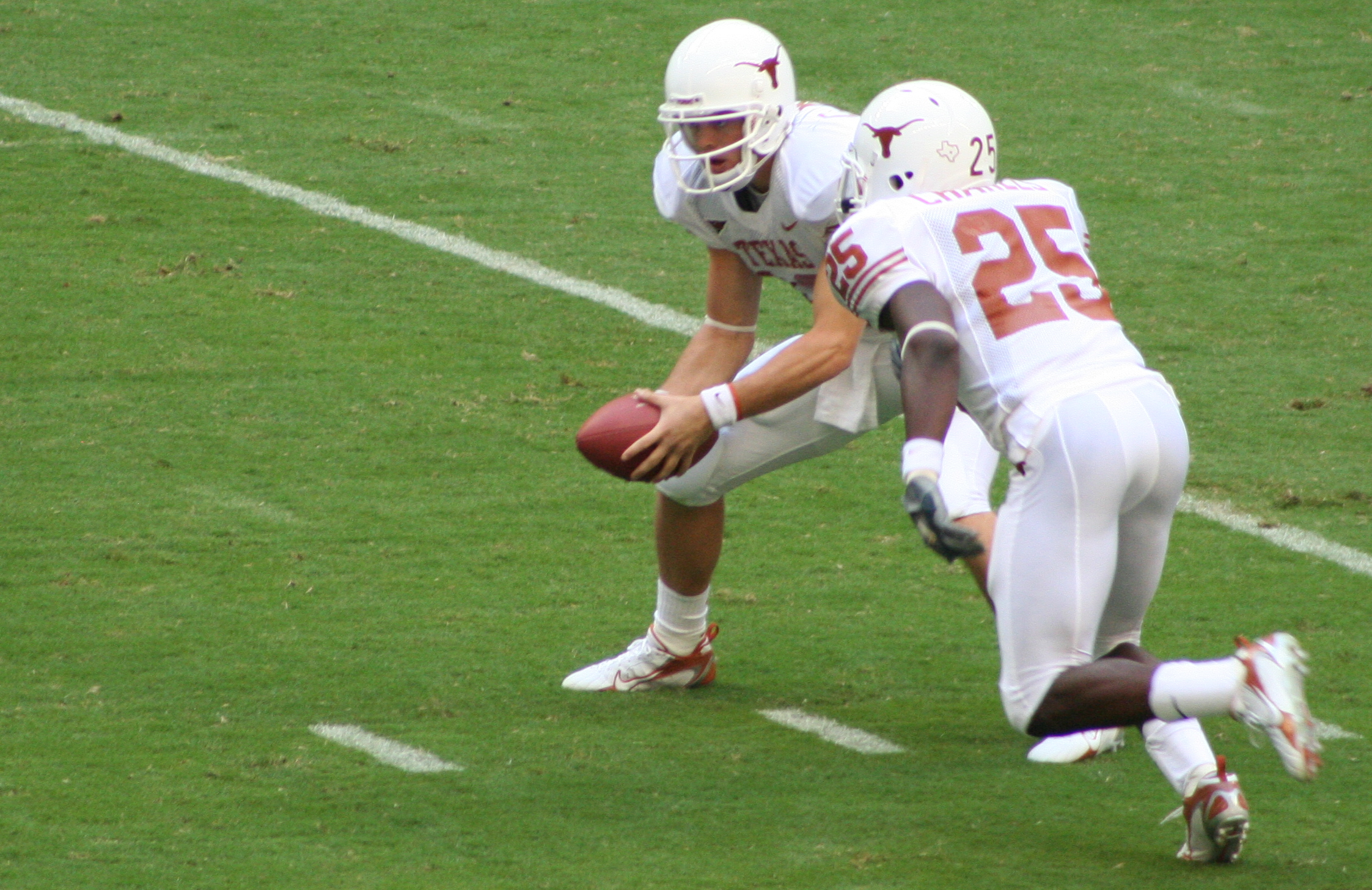
#12 Colt McCoy and #25 Jamaal Charles (2006)

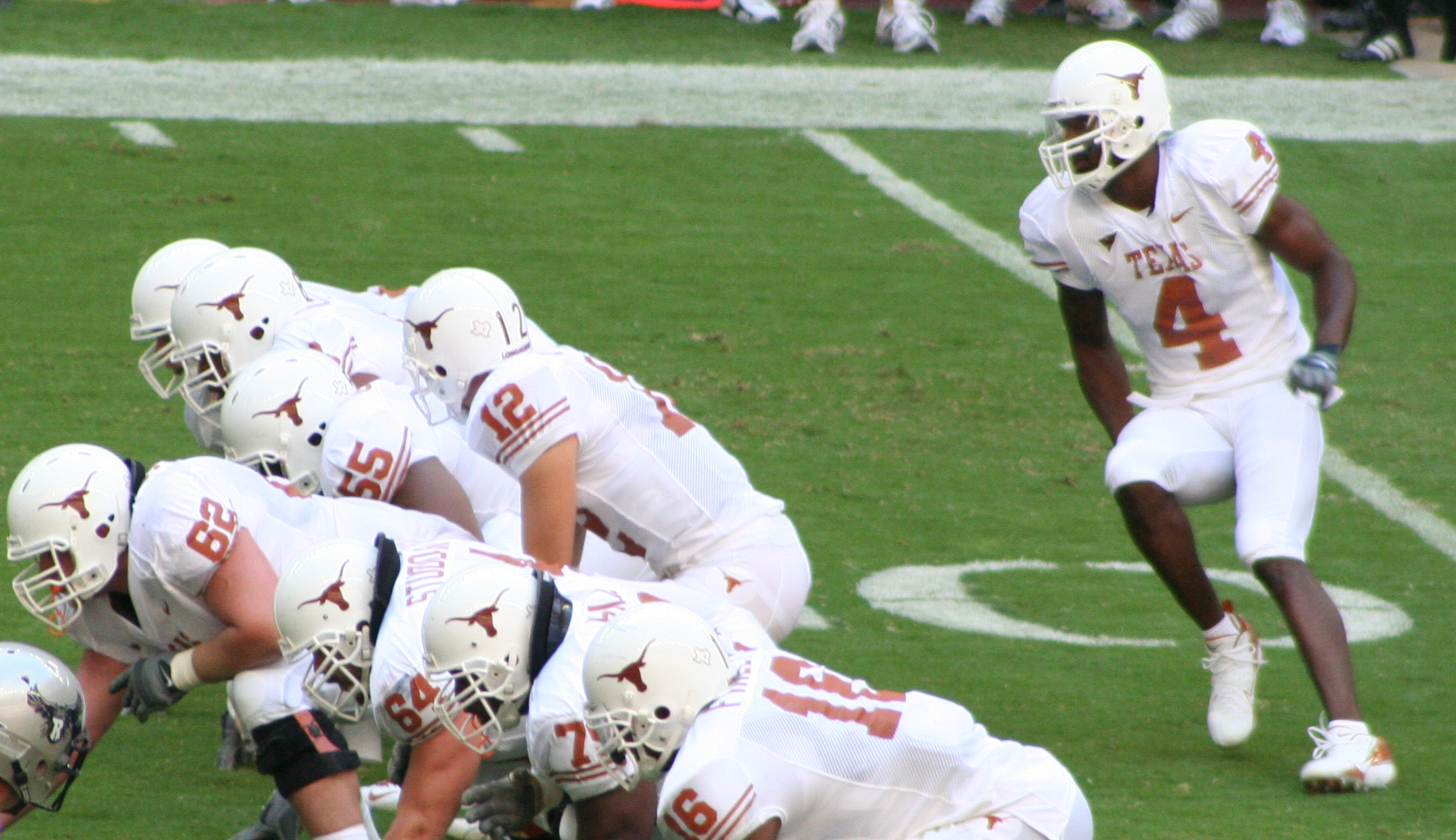
#4 Limas Sweed (2006)

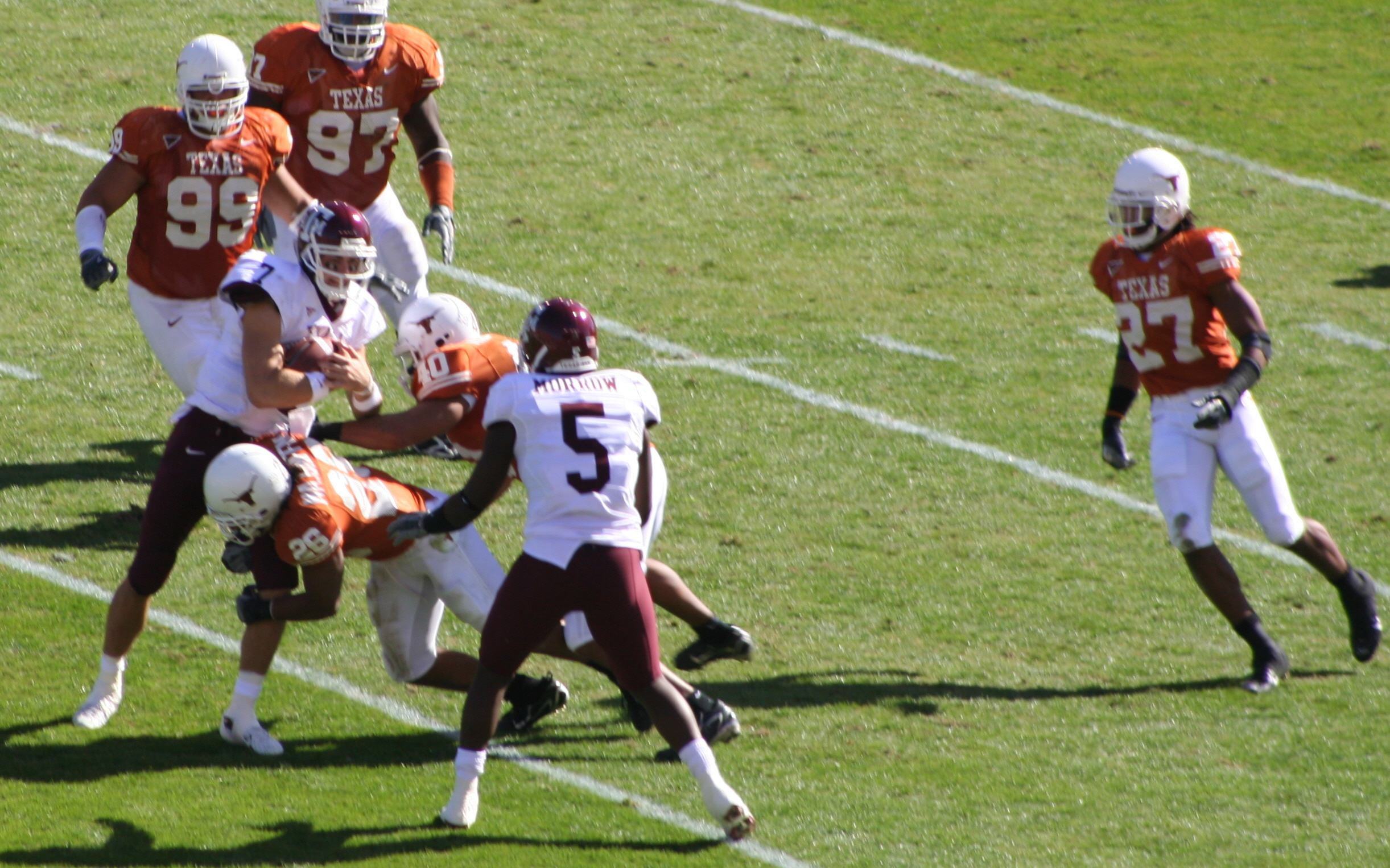
#26 Marcus Griffin and #40 Robert Killebrew tackle Stephen McGee of Texas A&M. (2006)

Longhorns listed on preseason All-American or "All-Conference" teams or on award watch lists:

- Jamaal Charles
  - Maxwell Award watch list
  - Doak Walker Award watch list
  - Athlon Sports third-team All American
  - Athlon Sports first-team All Big 12
- Jermichael Finley
  - Mackey Award watch list
- Marcus Griffin
  - Outland Trophy watch list
  - Athlon Sports second-team All Big 12
- Robert Killebrew
  - Athlon Sports third-team All Big 12
- Tony Hills
  - Lombardi Award watch list
  - Outland Trophy watch list
  - Athlon Sports first-team All Big 12
- Drew Kelson
  - Lott Trophy
- Derek Lokey
  - Lombardi Award watch list
  - Outland Trophy watch list
  - Nagurski Trophy watch list
  - Lott Trophy
  - Athlon Sports first-team All Big 12
- Colt McCoy
  - Maxwell Award watch list
  - CBS Sportsline.com Heisman Trophy Watch
  - Walter Camp Football Foundation Player of the Year Award watch list
  - Athlon Sports first-team All Big 12
  - Davey O'Brien Award
  - Manning Award
- Roddrick Muckelroy
  - Athlon Sports second-team All Big 12
- Frank Okam
  - Lombardi Award watch list
  - Outland Trophy watch list
  - Bednarik Award watch list
  - Athlon Sports first-team All Big 12
- Brian Orakpo
  - Athlon Sports third-team All Big 12
- Limas Sweed
  - Biletnikoff Award candidate
  - Maxwell Award candidate
  - Walter Camp Football Foundation Player of the Year Award watch list
  - ESPN Scouts Inc. Top 10 professional prospects list
  - Athlon Sports second-team All Big 12

=== Recruiting ===
Texas' 2007 recruiting class was rated by Scout.com as third-best in the nation, behind Florida and USC. Of their picks for the top 100 incoming freshman, Texas signed #8 Tray Allan (offensive lineman), #14 Curtis Brown (cornerback), #30 Andre (Dre) Jones (defensive tackle), #31 John Chiles (wide receiver), and #81 Russell Carter (defensive end). Carter made the preseason roster as a defensive end while Chiles was listed as a quarterback. Jones was suspended from the team due to legal trouble.

== Game summaries ==
=== Arkansas State ===
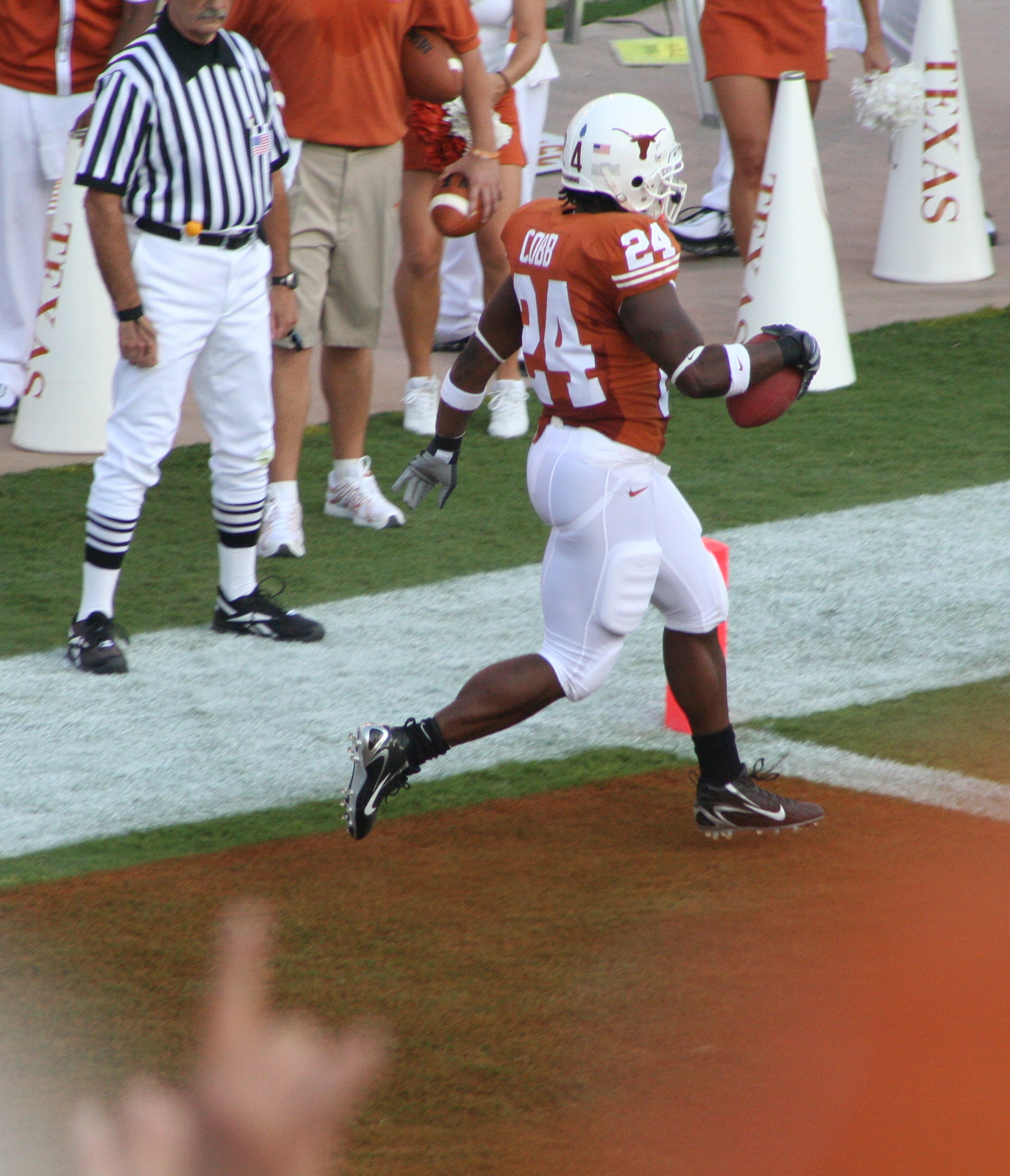
Running back Antwan Cobb backs into the end zone for a touchdown on a 16-yard pass from Colt McCoy.

Arkansas State at #4 Texas

Team	1	2	3	4	Total
Arkansas St	3	0	0	10	13
• Texas	14	0	7	0	21

- Date: September 1
- Location: Darrell K Royal–Texas Memorial Stadium, Austin, Texas
- Game start: 7:00
- Game attendance: 84,440
- TV announcers (FSN PPV): Kevin Eschenfelder, Chris Sanders, Dave Cody

The first Longhorn game of the season marked the first-ever meeting between Texas and Arkansas State, an NCAA Division I Football Bowl Subdivision team from the Sun Belt Conference. Pre-game media attention played upon the fact that both schools won national football championships in 1970. Both schools entered the game with a level of controversy attached to their teams. Arkansas State was facing criticism over its team name. The team was nicknamed "Indians" in honor of the Osage Nation that inhabited the area until the 1800s. The NCAA enforced restrictions on the use of Indian mascots, saying that they were derogatory to American Indians. In 2008, the Indians changed their name to the Red Wolves. The University of Texas was dealing with player suspensions, and passed a large pay raise for Mack Brown one week prior to the game. As part of the package, Brown received a $100,000 special payment upon completion of the game.

Two days prior to the game, Las Vegas casinos favored Texas by 39points. Sportswriters John Bridges and Kirk Bohls of the Austin American-Statesman predicted the Longhorns would have a big lead early in the game and that true-freshman quarterback John Chiles would enter the game in the second or third quarter as the backup to Colt McCoy. Redshirt freshman quarterback Sherrod Harris was on the injured list and was not expected to play. Those predictions were off the mark as the Indians almost kept up with the Horns and McCoy stayed in for the entire game.

Texas scored a touchdown on its first possession and Arkansas State answered with a field goal. Texas made another touchdown to end the first quarter. Neither team scored in the second quarter. Texas scored seven points in the third quarter, while Arkansas State was scoreless. In the fourth quarter, Arkansas State scored ten points to pull within eight points of Texas. With approximately one minute left to play, Arkansas State attempted an onside kick. State recovered the ball, but a controversial illegal formation penalty forced them to re-kick. On the re-kick, Texas recovered the ball and was able to run out the clock to preserve a 21–13 win. Colt McCoy threw two touchdown passes and two interceptions; he also made two punts. Jamaal Charles accounted for the third touchdown.

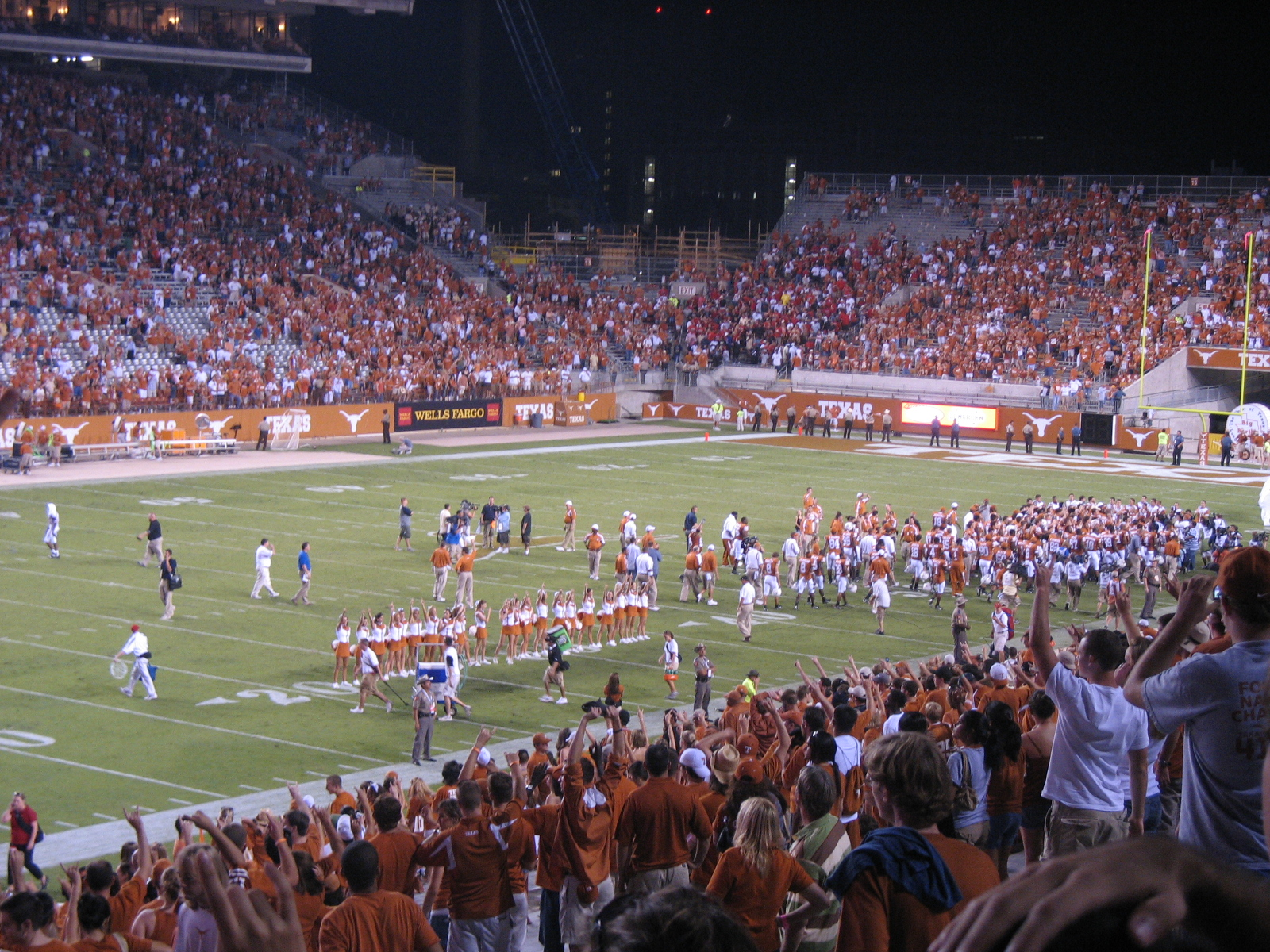
The team and fans sing The Eyes of Texas after the victory.

Starting Longhorn defensive end Brian Orakpo injured his right knee during the game. The team reported Orakpo did not need surgery but that it was uncertain when he would return.

Kirk Bohls was among commentators who were unimpressed by the Longhorns performance, saying, "if this becomes the pattern, look for a 7–5 season." On September 5, Arkansas State coach Steve Roberts said he was told by the Big 12 Conference's supervisor of football officials that game officials wrongly overturned ASU's recovery of the onside kick. He said the Big 12 Conference Supervisor of Officials told Arkansas State there had been no illegal formation, that no penalty should have been called, and that Arkansas State should have been awarded possession of the football. A Big 12 Conference spokesman said he could not confirm or deny that such a conversation took place and that any such conversation was confidential.

=== TCU ===
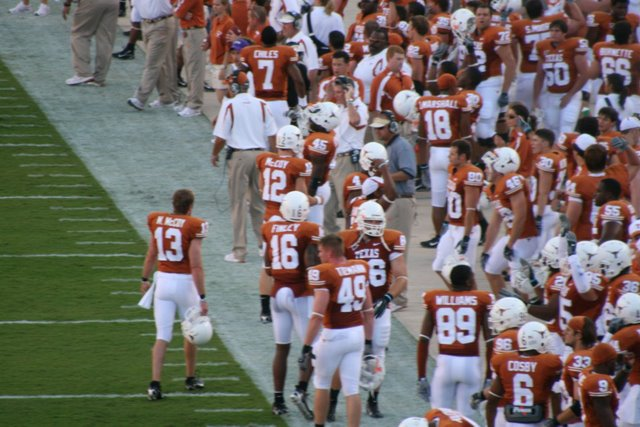
Texas sideline prior to TCU game

#19 TCU at #7 Texas

Team	1	2	3	4	Total
TCU	0	10	0	3	13
• Texas	0	0	10	24	34

- Date: September 8
- Location: Darrell K Royal–Texas Memorial Stadium, Austin, Texas
- Game start: 7:00
- Game attendance: 84,621
- TV announcers (FSN): Joel Meyers, Dave Lapham, Jim Knox

The second Longhorn game of the season was the first meeting of the former Southwest Conference (SWC) rivals since the conference disbanded following the 1995 season. Texas held a 60–20–1 (win-lose-tie) record vs. the TCU Horned Frogs. Their most recent meeting was a 27–19 Longhorn victory.

In their annual season preview magazine, CBS SportsLine.com selected two Longhorn games — vs. TCU and against OU — as ranking in their 17 "must see" games for 2007. CBS Sportsline.com also selected TCU as one of the potential "BCS Busters" for 2007, saying, "The Horned Frogs will have one of the best defenses in the nation with nine starters back on a squad that allowed only 12.3 points per game last year, including a 12–3 victory over Texas Tech. Garry Patterson has made the Horned Frogs one of the best BCS non-AQ conference schools in the nation, but unlike Utah and Boise State, they had not received the opportunity to play in a Bowl Championship Series bowl. If TCU can get past Texas on Sept. 8, it might finally be time for the Horned Frogs to invade the BCS party."

Texas' narrow win versus Arkansas State in week one, together with TCU's victory over Baylor, fueled speculation that the 2007 Horned Frogs might have a chance at an upset victory over the Longhorns. Texas dropped three places to number seven in the AP Poll and the Coaches Poll, while TCU moved up three places to number nineteen. One day prior to the game, Las Vegas casinos picked Texas to win by 9½ points.

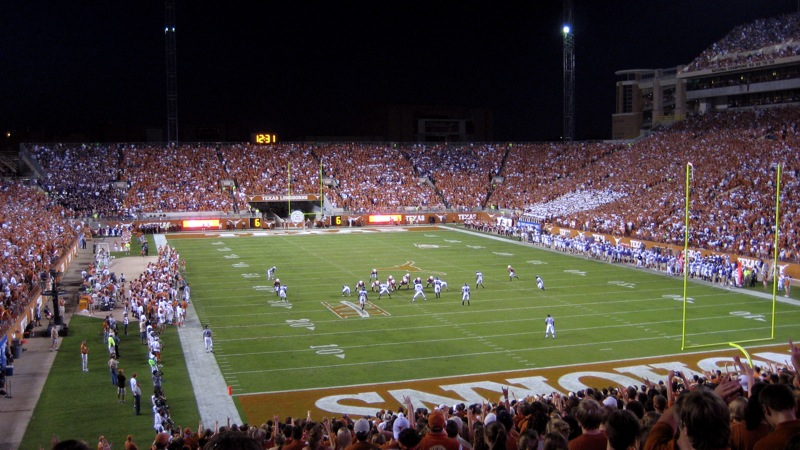
First scoring drive for Texas

Both teams were scoreless in the first quarter. In the second quarter, TCU's Torrey Stewart faked a blitz, then dropped back and caught an interception from Colt McCoy before running in for a touchdown. Later in the quarter, McCoy threw a pass that was tipped by a defender and intercepted by David Roach. The Longhorn defense kept the Horned Frogs out of the end zone following the interception, but the Frogs scored on a 19-yard field goal by Chris Manfredini. The first half ended with TCU leading, 10–0.

The Longhorns' first second-half drive culminated in a 33-yard touchdown pass to Nate Jones. A fumble by TCU gave Texas good field position, but the Longhorns were stopped on the two-yard line and settled for a game-tying field goal. The Horns held TCU to seventeen yards of offense and no first downs in the quarter.

In the fourt quarter, Colt McCoy set up the go-ahead score with a scramble to the TCU one-yard line. Vondrell McGee scored a touchdown two plays later. Texas' next possession resulted in a second field goal by Ryan Bailey. The Longhorn defense held TCU to a three-and-out but TCU's punter fumbled the ball, and Brandon Foster ran the ball in for a touchdown, capping 27 straight points for Texas. The Frogs came back and scored 37-yard field goal by Manfredini and then attempted an onsides kick but Texas recovered the ball. UT's Jamaal Charles made a 39-yard rushing touchdown for the game's final score. Texas won, 34–13. The attendance for the game, 84,621, was the third-largest crowd ever to watch a TCU football game.

=== UCF ===
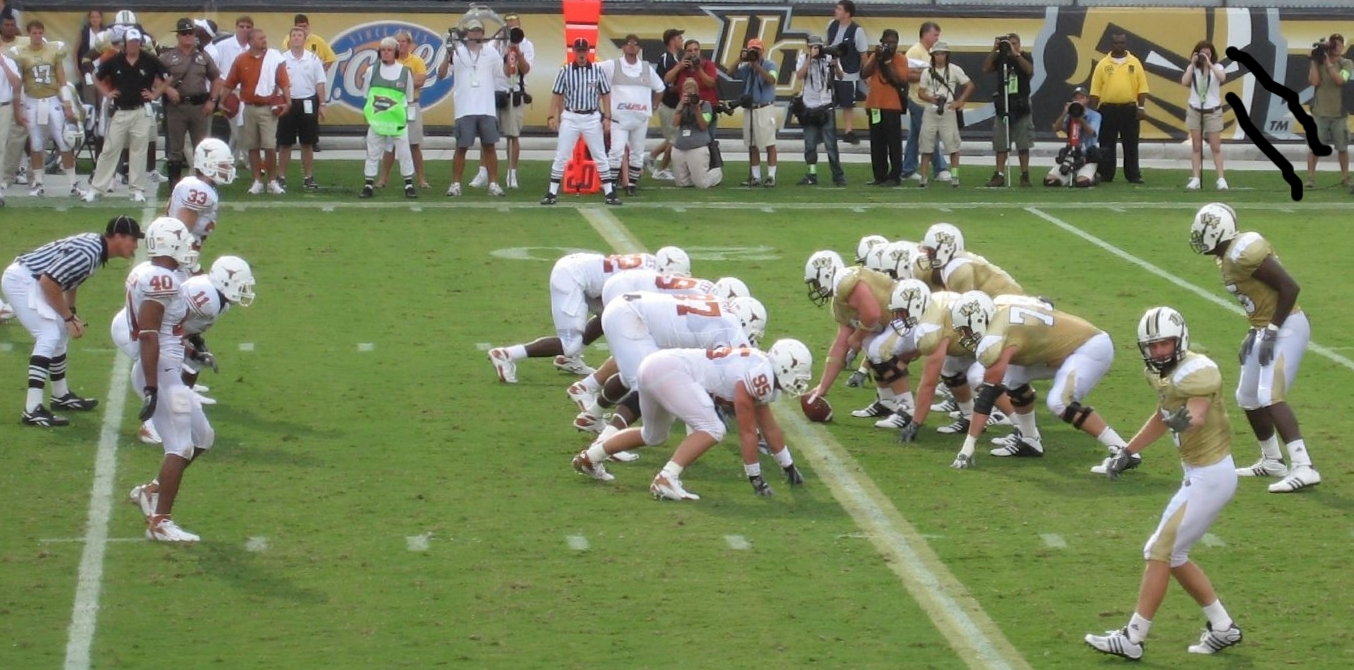
Knights on offense

#6 Texas at UCF

Team	1	2	3	4	Total
• Texas	10	10	3	12	35
UCF	7	3	7	15	32

- Date: September 15
- Location: Bright House Networks Stadium, Orlando, Florida
- Game start: 3:30
- Game attendance: 45,622
- TV announcers (ESPN2): Bob Wischusen, David Norrie, Jeannine Edwards

The third game of the season was the first-ever meeting between the Longhorns and the UCF Knights. Texas was the first opponent in the Knights' new stadium, Bright House Networks Stadium, and the game was the first of three scheduled meetings between the schools. The Knights opened their season with an upset of North Carolina State; the victory was their second victory over a BCS opponent and the first time for the Knights to beat a BCS school since 2000. They followed the win with a week off, giving them two weeks to prepare for Texas. It was just the sixth time Texas had played in Florida and was the team's first appearance in the state since 1965. The number six-ranked Longhorns were the highest rank team the Knights had ever played. UCF coach George O'Leary said prior to the game, "When you talk about elite teams, Texas is an elite team from an athletics, traditions and overall standpoint."

Several Longhorn players missed the game due to injuries or suspensions. Starting defensive end Brian Orakpo missed his second straight game as a result of suffering a knee sprain against Arkansas State. Starting offensive tackle Adam Ulatoski was listed as doubtful. Backup quarterback Sherrod Harris was also injured and had not seen action since spraining his knee on August 12. Wide receiver Jordan Shipley participated in his first game since a preseason injury. Defensive end Henry Melton, linebacker Sergio Kindle and receiver Billy Pittman were serving the last game of their three-game suspensions. On September 13, Tyrell Gatewood joined Andre Jones and Robert Joseph in receiving an indefinite suspension due to alleged illegal activities. The day prior to the game, sports books in Las Vegas picked Texas to win by 18 points.

A sell-out crowd greeted the Longhorns in Florida. UCF received the opening kickoff in their end-zone and took a touchback. UCF was not able to get a first down and before punting the ball to Texas. The Horns drove inside the UCF 20-yard line before being stopped on fourth-and-short and settling for a field goal. On their second possession, the Knights drove the ball down the field for a touchdown and a four-point lead. Shortly thereafter, lightning was spotted near the stadium and both teams were sent into their locker rooms for approximately 15 minutes before play resumed. Texas' first drive after the delay culminated in a six-yard touchdown pass to Nate Jones. When the first quarter ended, the Longhorns had a three-point lead and the Knights had the ball. In the second quarter, the Longhorns and the Knights each fumbled inside the UCF ten-yard line. Texas scored ten points in the quarter to UCF's three. The score at halftime was 20–10, Texas.

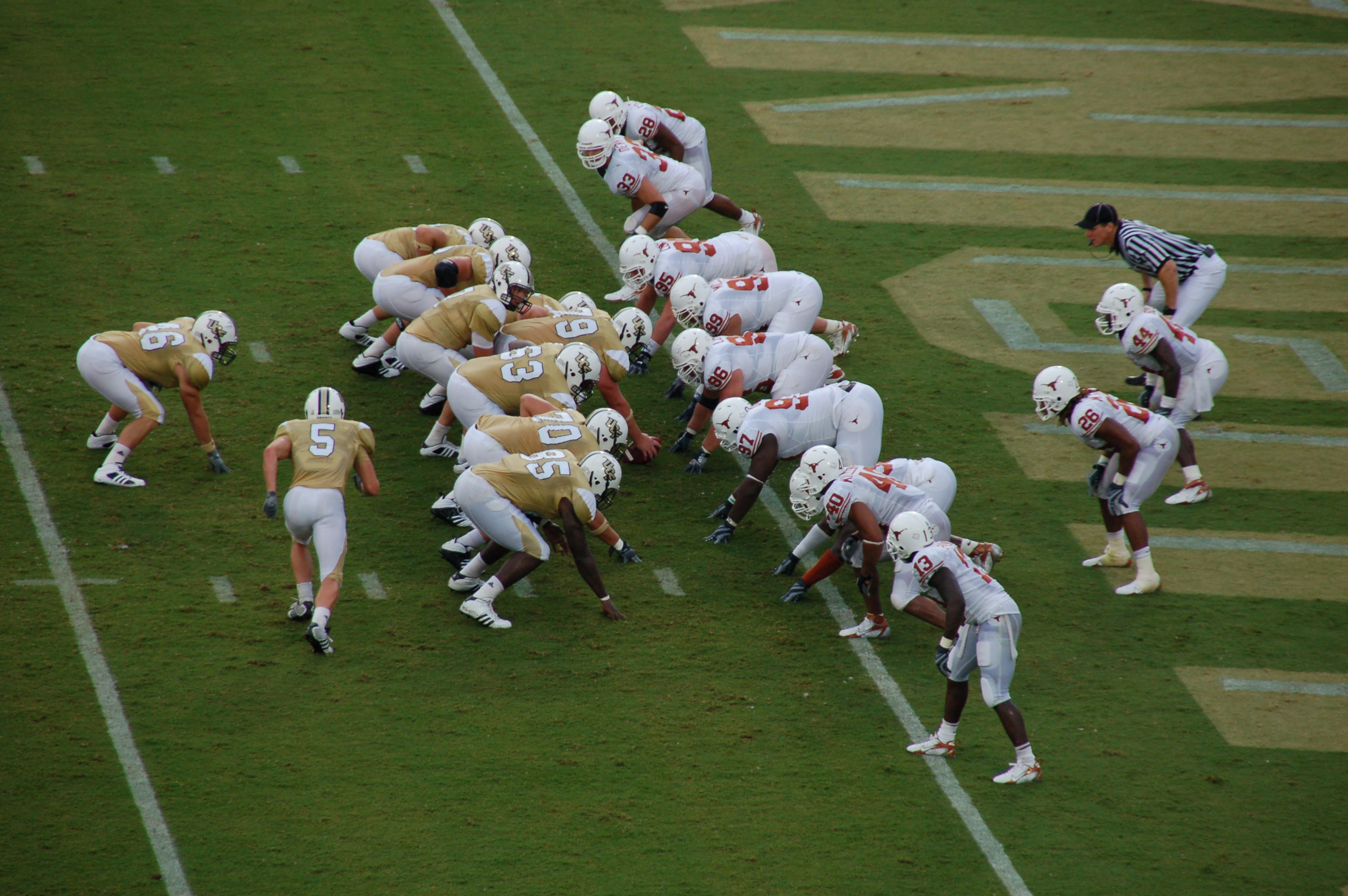
UCF Knights at the Texas goal-line

Texas began the scoring in the third quarter with a 49-yard field goal. UCF needed just five plays to reply with a touchdown and cut Texas' lead to 23–17. After two punts by the Horns and one by the Knights, UCF turned the ball over on downs. On the next play, McCoy threw an interception and UCF's resulting drive culminated in a touchdown to give the Knights a 24–23 lead with 13:38 left in the game. The Longhorns regained the lead with two field goals and a touchdown. A Longhorn attempt at a two-point conversion failed, making the score 35–24. This decision was later criticized by commentators who said that the decision allowed UCF a chance to tie the game.

With 2:14 remaining, Longhorn Jamaal Charles committed his second fumble of the game. UCF recovered the ball and completed a touchdown and a two-point conversion to cut Texas' lead to 35–32 with 35 seconds remaining. When the Knights were unable to recover their onside kick attempt, Texas was able to run out the clock and preserve a three-point victory.

Jamaal Charles of Texas rushed 22 times for 157 yards and Kevin Smith of UCF rushed 27 times for 150 yards for UCF. McCoy completed 68% of his passes for a total of 227 yards; UCF's Kyle Israel completed 35% of his passes for a total of 133 yards. McCoy's 47 passing attempts tied a UT single-game record. His 32 completions set a new school record, besting the 30 completed by Vince Young during the 2006 Rose Bowl and by Major Applewhite during two 1999 games. Due to his performance in the game, Texas cornerback Brandon Foster was named the Big 12's defensive player of the week. For the second week in a row, Foster scored a touchdown on defense. Foster was recognized by the conference the previous week for his work on special teams, making him the first Longhorn to get back-to-back conference honors since running back Hodges Mitchell in 2000. Kicker Ryan Bailey tied a school record with five field goals. Combined with his previous attempts, the five kicks made him seven-of-nine for the season at that point.

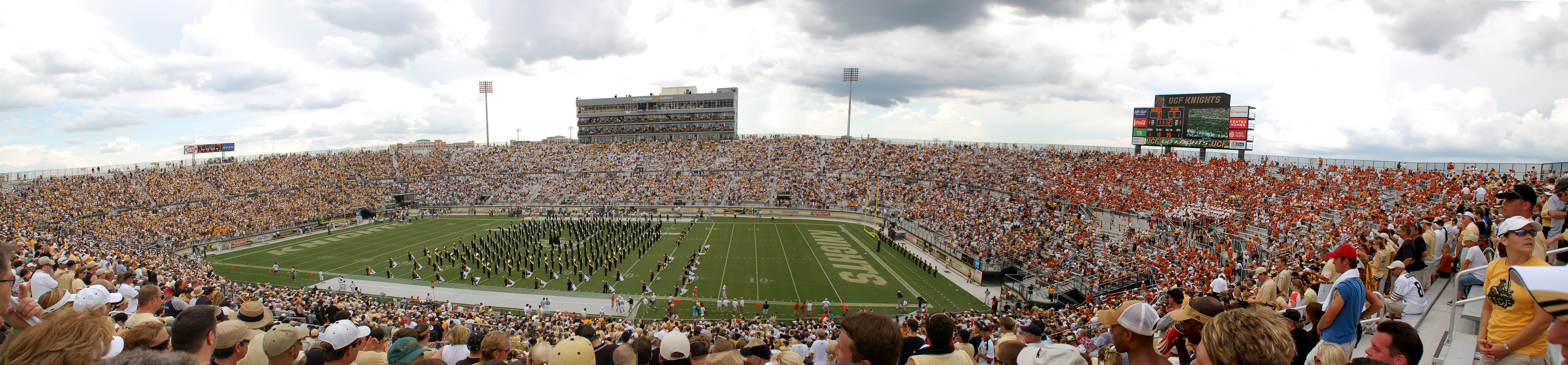
Bright House Networks Stadium during the pre-game festivities

=== Rice ===
Rice at #6 Texas

Team	1	2	3	4	Total
Rice	0	7	0	7	14
• Texas	10	31	14	3	58

- Date: September 22
- Location: Darrell K Royal–Texas Memorial Stadium, Austin, Texas
- Game start: 7:00
- Game attendance: 84,571
- TV announcers (FSN): Bill Land, Gary Reasons, Emily Jones

Prior to the 2007 season, Texas and Rice had competed in football on 89 prior occasions. The series, which began in 1914, is the fourth oldest (by number of games) in Texas history. The Owls were 21-67-1 against Texas heading into the game, including the sixth-longest streak of one college football team winning over another team.

After their narrow victory over the UCF Knights, the Longhorns remained in sixth place in the coaches' poll and dropped from sixth to seventh place in the Associated Press poll. Jeff Sagarin, whose computer rankings are used as a component of the Bowl Championship Series rankings, had the Longhorns at number twelve coming into the game. Sagarin's system had Rice ranked as the worst team in Division I-A and 181st in the country, behind many I-AA teams. Four days prior to the game, Las Vegas favored UT by 39 points. The Longhorns suspended special teams player James Henry prior to the game, but three Longhorn players—Billy Pittman, Henry Melton, and Sergio Kindle—were able to rejoin the team after serving three game suspensions. Brian Orakpo missed his third straight game due to an injury received in the season-opening game. The Owls came into the game 0–3 after losing the previous week to Texas Tech by a score of 59–24.

The Longhorns started the game on offense and had no success on their first drive. On the first play, Colt McCoy threw an incompletion, and on the second play, Jamaal Charles fumbled the ball to the Owls. The Texas defense held Rice to a field goal attempt, which was no good. Texas scored a touchdown on a 13-play drive that included converting a 4th-and-two situation. The Longhorns extended their lead to 41–0 before Rice scored a touchdown with 18 seconds left in the first half. In the second half, Texas scored two touchdowns and one field goal, and Rice scored one touchdown. Texas won 58–14.

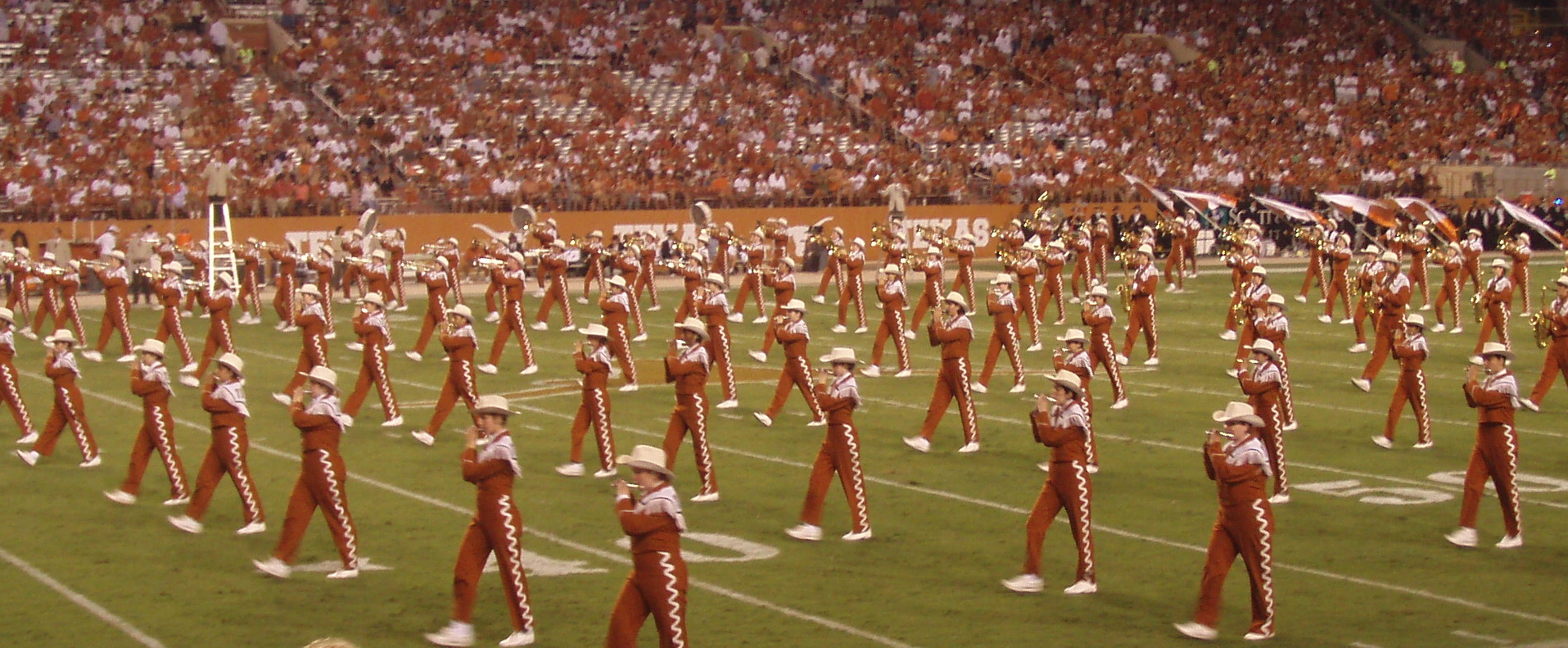
The Longhorn band performs March Grandioso at the game.

McCoy completed 20 of his 29 passing attempts, accumulating 333 yards through the air. For the first time in the season, he did not throw an interception. McCoy and most of the Longhorn starting players were replaced by backups after the first drive of the second half. True freshman quarterback John Chiles made his first appearance as a Texas player in the first quarter, when he participated in a single play. He came out of the game after the play before returning in the third quarter as McCoy's replacement. On his first drive, Chiles led the Longhorns 80 yards to a touchdown, carrying the ball 4 times for 49 yards. He also threw one incomplete pass (one of two he threw in the game) and handed off to Vondrell McGee three times for thirty-one yards. Redshirt freshman Sherrod Harris replaced Chiles for the final two drives of the game. Chiles' strong performance immediately led to media speculation as to how the Longhorns could get him more playing time.

McGee was the game's leading rusher, and had 8 carries for 80 yards. Jamaal Charles rushed 14 times for 72 yards, and John Chiles ran 9 times for 72 yards. Limas Sweed was the leading receiver with 5 catches for 139 yards and 2 touchdowns as he set a new career high for receiving yards in a single game. Sergio Kindle injured his knee, and defensive end Eddie Jones injured his shoulder, but neither injury was thought to be serious.

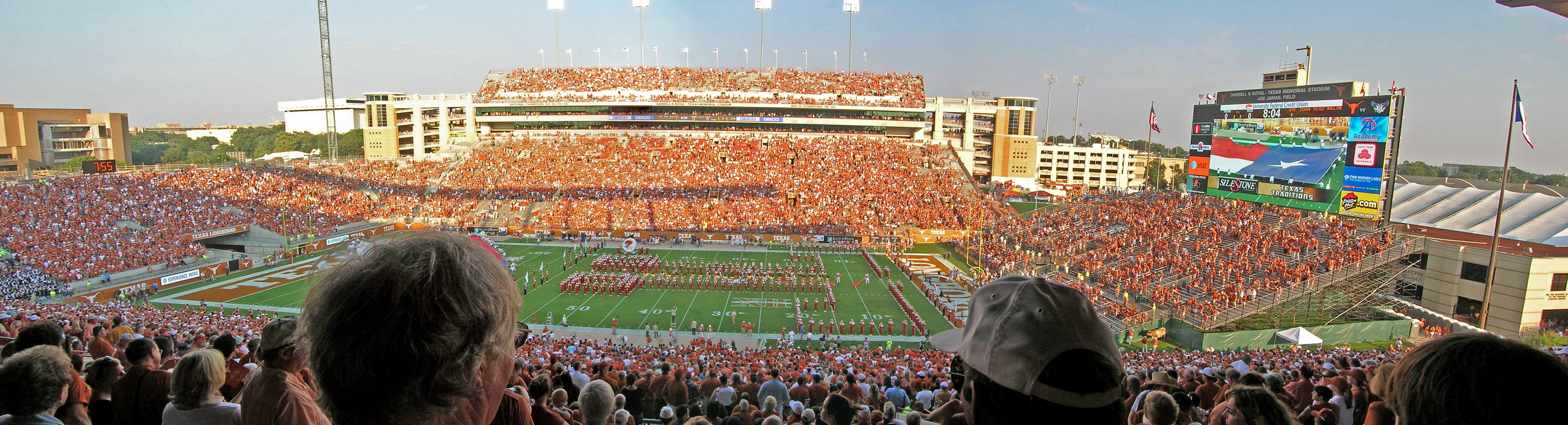
Pre-game festivities at Darrell K Royal-Texas Memorial Stadium prior to the Rice game

=== Kansas State ===
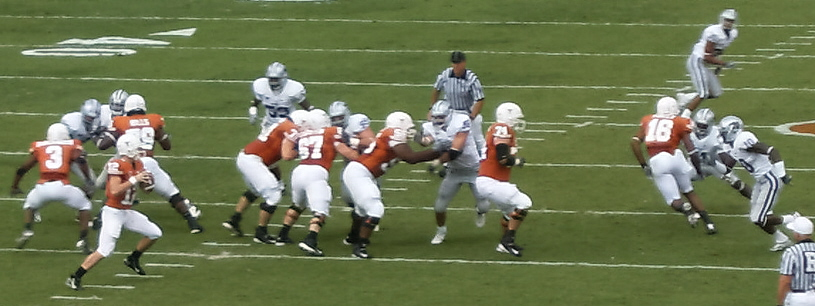
McCoy drops back to pass

Kansas State at #7 Texas

Team	1	2	3	4	Total
• Kansas State	7	17	10	7	41
Texas	7	7	7	0	21

- Date: September 29
- Location: Darrell K Royal–Texas Memorial Stadium, Austin, Texas
- Game start: 3:30
- Game attendance: 84,864
- TV announcers (ABC): Ron Franklin, Ed Cunningham, Jack Arute

Texas first played Kansas State in 1913 and held a record of 5–4–0 in the series prior to 2007. Since the Kansas State Wildcats belong to the north division of the Big 12 Conference, Texas plays KSU two out of every four years. In the 2006 meeting, fourth-ranked Texas was favored by 16 points over an unranked Kansas State team; Colt McCoy was injured early in the game and KSU went on to defeat Texas 45–42. This defeat snapped the Longhorns' 17-game road winning streak as well as the national-best 21-game conference winning steak.

One day prior to the 2007 game, Las Vegas casinos picked Texas to win by 15 points. Kansas State got the ball to start the game and scored a touchdown on their opening drive. Texas answered with a touchdown on a drive that featured backup quarterback John Chiles in the game alongside Colt McCoy for some plays. The first quarter ended with the score tied 7–7.

In the second quarter, Kansas State took a 24–14 lead and Colt McCoy was injured and headed to the locker room just before halftime. McCoy came back as the Longhorn quarterback at the start of the third quarter, but Texas was never able to erase the deficit and lost, 41–21. With about two minutes left in the game, McCoy again headed to the locker room early and Chiles led the Longhorns' last drive.

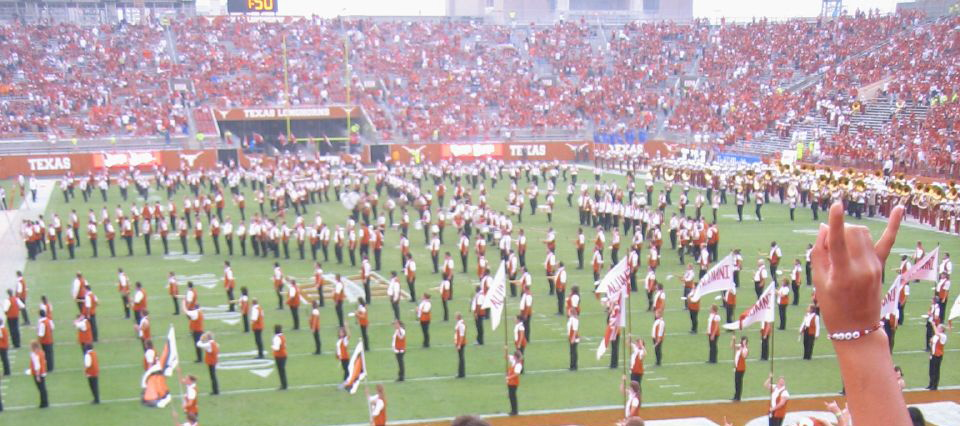
The Texas Longhorn band and the alumni band perform during the rain at halftime.

McCoy threw for 200 yards and had four interceptions during the worst performance of his college career. Sports Illustrated selected him as one of the season's 10 "Most Disappointing College Players" and noted that his nine interceptions thrown to that point in 2007 were already two more than he threw during the entire 2006 season. Kansas State had no turnovers and scored 21 points on defense and special teams. The Wildcats scored one touchdown on a punt return, one on a kick return, and one on an interception. Previously, Texas had never allowed all three types of scores in a single season. The 41 points were the most scored against Texas in Austin since UCLA handed the Longhorns a 66–3 loss in 1997. The loss to Kansas State was the worst home defeat in the Mack Brown era at Texas. Stewart Mandel of Sports Illustrated listed several factors that contributed to the Longhorns' struggles. He cited the off-field problems as evidence that no UT player has been able to show the superior leadership skills of Vince Young. Mandel said that McCoy, still only a sophomore, had not been able to completely fill that gap and that McCoy's play had not been as good as during 2006. He also said part of the blame should be placed on an offensive line that lost several starters and had not been able to consistently protect McCoy. Finally, he noted that the running game had been "equally inconsistent". The win over UT was the Wildcats' first road victory over a top–ten team in school history.

=== Oklahoma ===
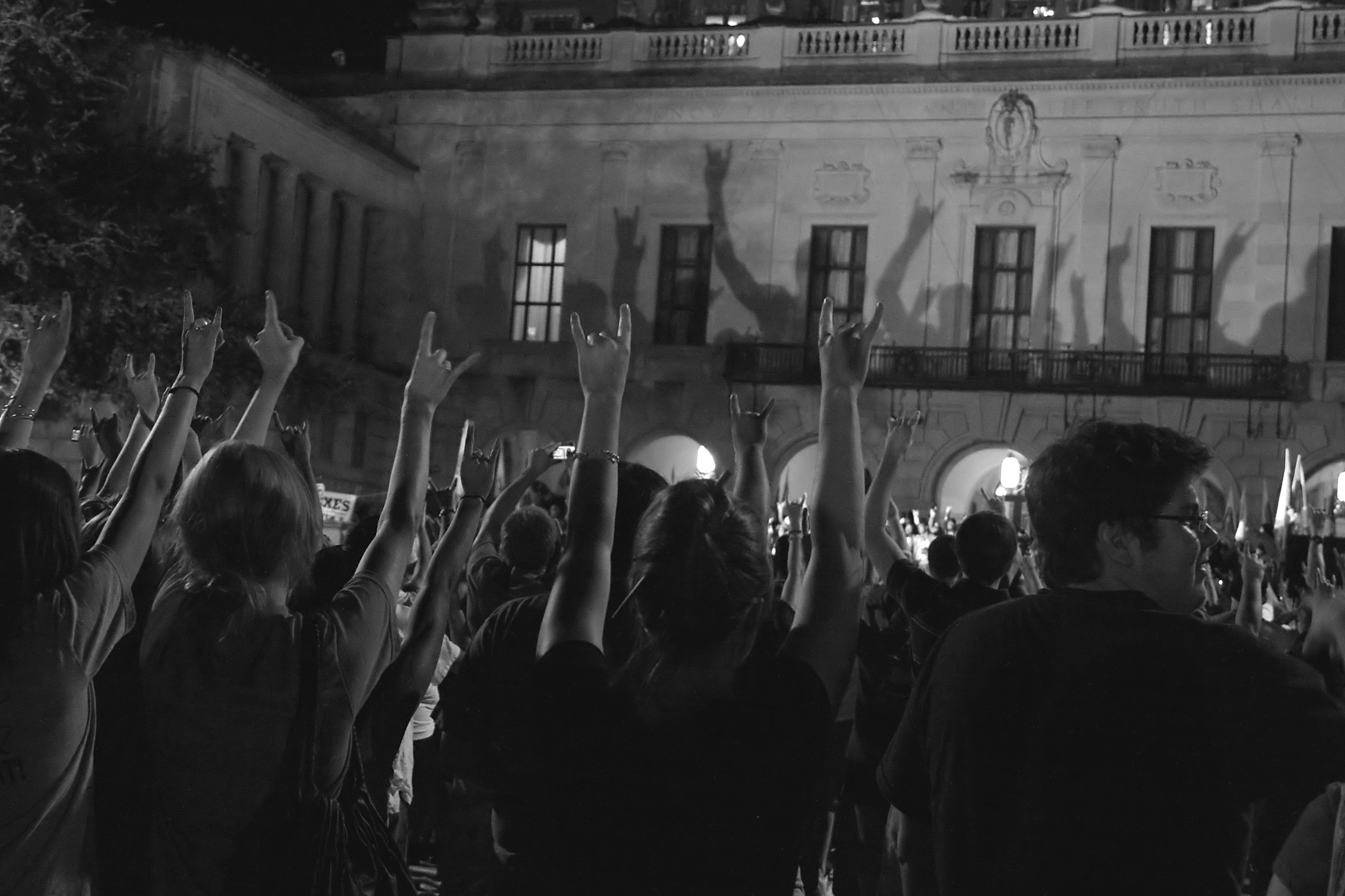
UT Torchlight Parade, 2007

#10 Oklahoma vs. #16 Texas

Team	1	2	3	4	Total
• Oklahoma	7	7	7	7	28
Texas	0	14	0	7	21

- Date: October 6
- Location: Cotton Bowl, Dallas
- Game start: 3:30
- Game attendance: 80,000
- TV announcers (ABC): Brad Nessler, Bob Griese, Paul Maguire, Bonnie Bernstein

The game against the 2007 Oklahoma Sooners football team marked the 102nd meeting of the Red River Shootout, which has been called one of the greatest sports rivalries in college football. It is Texas' second-longest running rivalry, just behind its rivalry with Texas A&M. Prior to 2007, Texas led the series 57–39–5, including the last two consecutive wins. The last match-up was a 28–10 Longhorn victory. Since 1929, the game has been held at the Cotton Bowl in Dallas, Texas typically in mid-October with the State Fair of Texas occurring adjacent to the stadium.

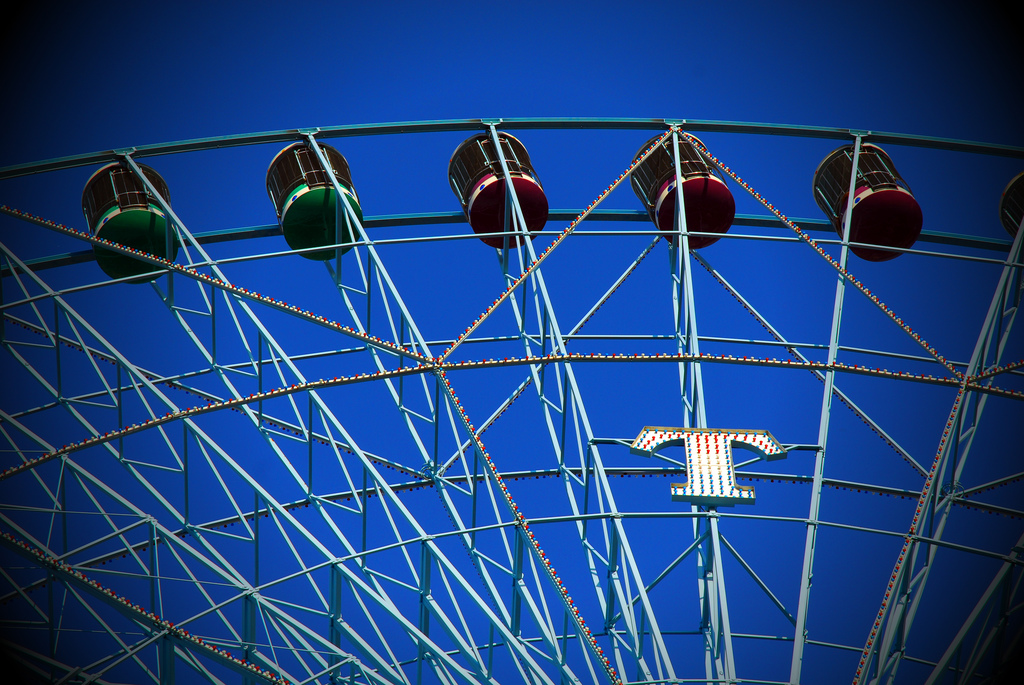
2007 Texas State Fair

CBS Sportsline.com listed the game sixth on its list of games to watch during the 2007 season, saying, "The annual Red River Shootout in Dallas will once again feature two top-ten teams with the winner being the front-runner for not only a Big 12 title but a factor in the national title picture. The game will also feature one of the best match-ups of the year with Limas Sweed and Billy Pittman of the Longhorns facing against Oklahoma's excellent secondary." Like Texas, Oklahoma suffered a defeat one week before the Red River Shootout, losing to the Colorado Buffaloes. Texas' loss pushed it to number 16 in the coaches poll and number 19 in the AP poll; OU fell to number 10 in both polls. The ranking marked Texas' 114th straight week to be listed in the AP poll, the longest active streak in the country and tying the school record. The Longhorns had been ranked 142 straight weeks in the coaches poll, the longest UT streak in any poll and the country's longest active streak in the coaches poll. On the morning of the Red River Shootout, oddsmakers favored Oklahoma to win by 12–13 points.

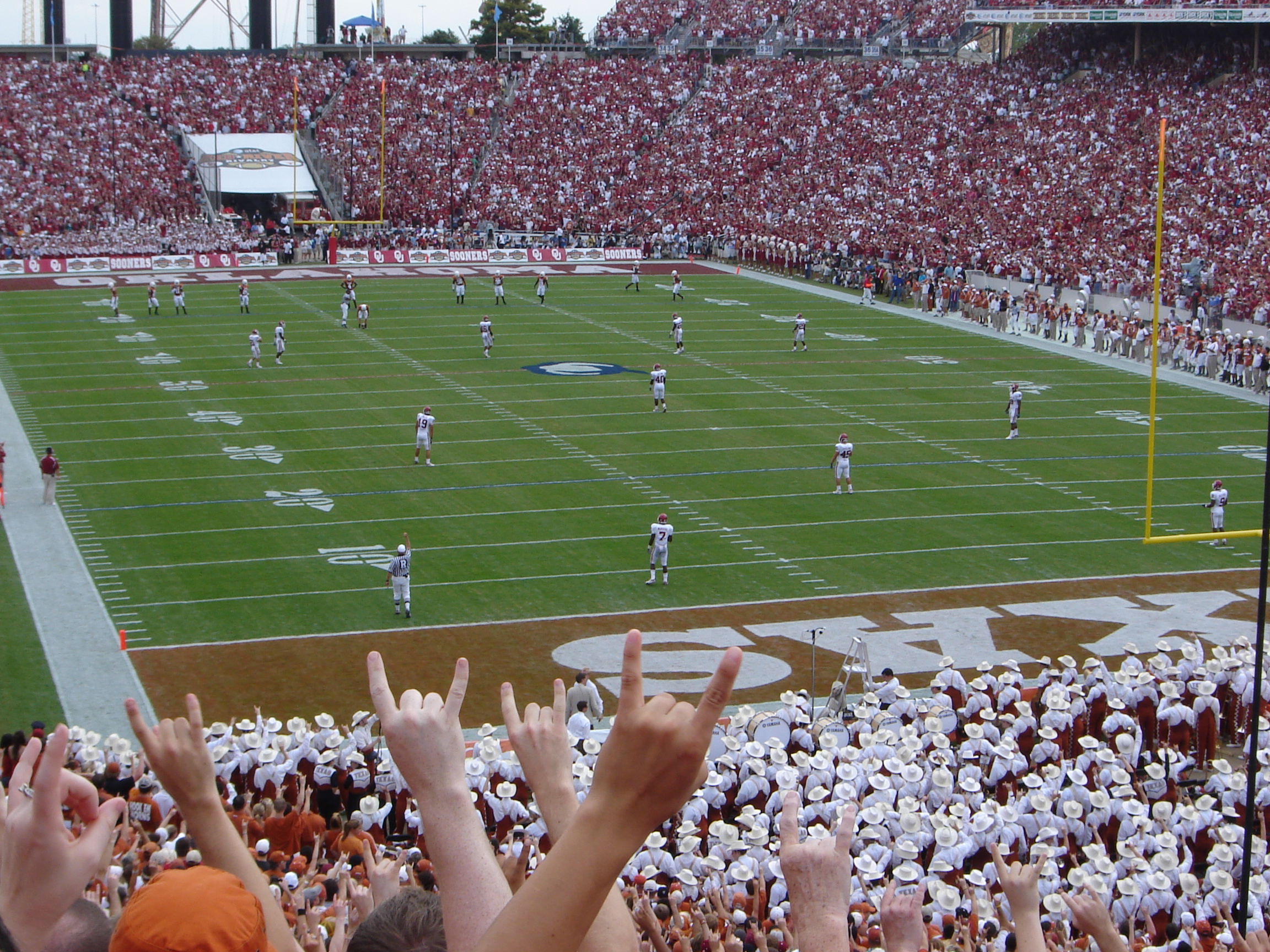
Texas kicks off to Oklahoma

The game was a back-and-forth affair ultimately won by Oklahoma, 28–21. OU's freshman quarterback, Sam Bradford, was 21–of–32 for 244 yards and 3 touchdowns. UT's McCoy was 19–of–26 for 324 yards and two touchdowns, earning the most passing yardage against an Oklahoma team since the 2004-season National Championship Game vs. USC. McCoy threw one interception, and Jamaal Charles lost a fumble inside the Oklahoma five yard-line. For the second straight week, the Texas defense did not cause any turnovers.

McCoy, who suffered a concussion the previous week, played the game with his throwing arm bandaged from mid-forearm to biceps and took four sacks and a blind-side late hit after one play had been whistled dead. With the loss, Texas opened conference play 0–2 for the first time since 1956. A bright spot for the Horns was tight end Jermichael Finley, who caught four passes for 149 yards. Jamaal Charles ran for 79 yards and John Chiles carried once for four yards. Counting the sacks to McCoy, Texas had a total of 61 yards rushing.

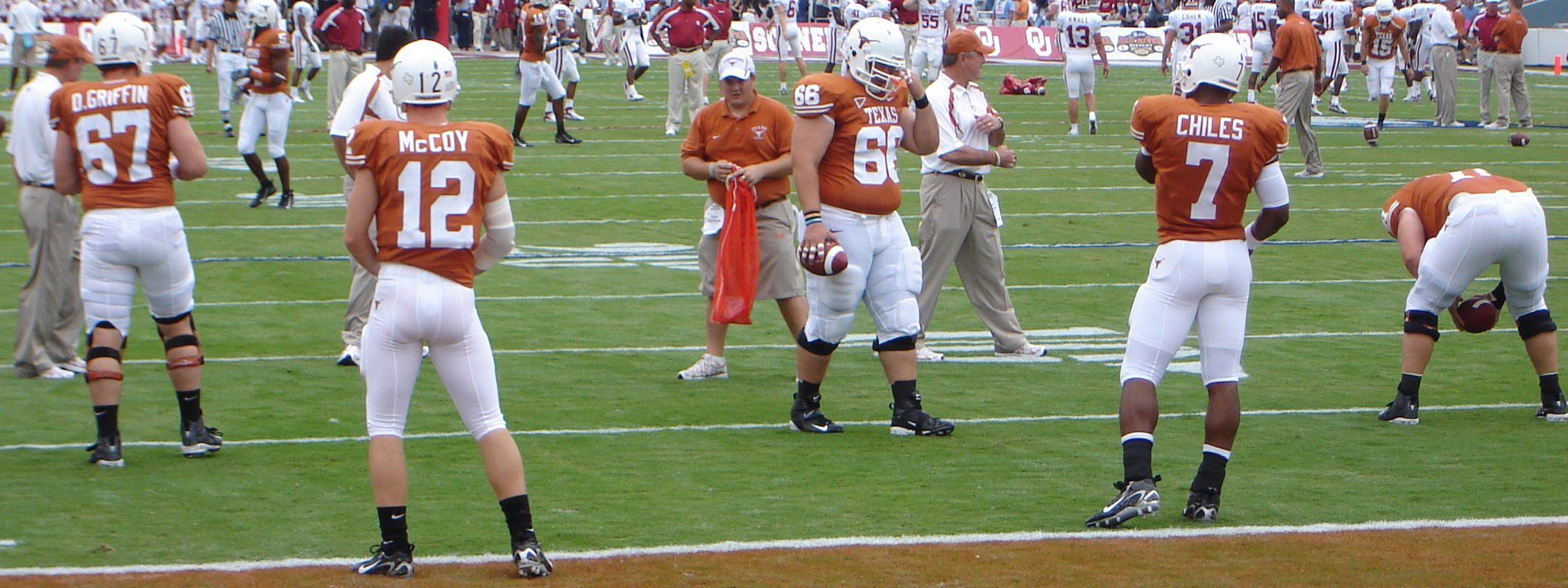
McCoy and Chiles in pre-game warmups

Receiver Limas Sweed left the game early because he re-injured his left wrist. He later had surgery to tighten the ligaments in the wrist but the injury ended his collegiate career. The Austin American-Statesman reported "Quan Cosby likely will move to Sweed's spot at split end, with Nate Jones moving to flanker. The Longhorns likely will decide between Billy Pittman and Jordan Shipley at slot receiver when Texas is in its base, three-receiver set."

Defensive end Aaron Lewis fractured his elbow in the game and was taken out of the lineup indefinitely. The Austin American-Statesman reported "A depth chart issued Monday shows Lamarr Houston moving to Lewis' spot at power end, with Brian Orakpo regaining his starting job at quick end. The Longhorns have been dealing with injuries at defensive end all season." Fullback Luke Tiemann also required surgery to repair a broken wrist, but was expected to miss only two games.

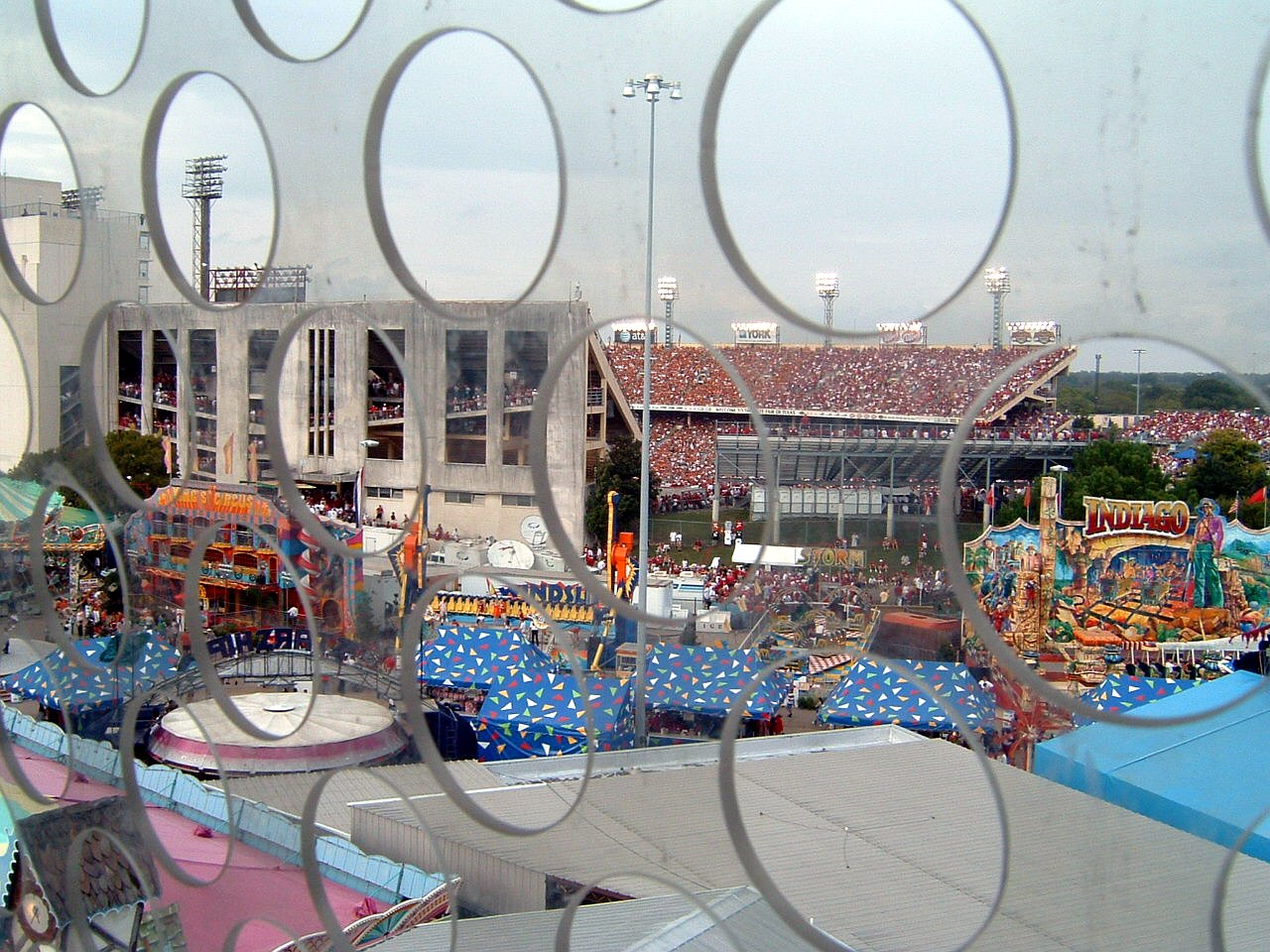
The 2007 Red River Shootout as viewed from the skyway of the Texas State Fair. Note the color change where the fans are divided at the 50 yard-line.

Jeff Duarte of the Houston Chronicle made note of Charles' fumble, McCoy's interception and the low rushing yardage. He said, "the Texas Longhorns went back and forth with Oklahoma for most of the game Saturday before eventually succumbing to the same problems that have taken them from a Top 10 ranking to the verge of dropping out of the national polls for the first time in seven years." The win kept the Sooners in position to win the south division of the Big12 Conference and could even allow them back into the national championship race.

Asked to assess his personal performance after the loss to Kansas State, Colt McCoy said, "I think I've had some bad luck, I'm definitely a better quarterback, definitely more experienced—I've just had some bad luck. Things that can go the wrong way, have gone the wrong way — tipped balls and that stuff." He also said there was room for improvement, "Teams are blitzing us a lot more. We've handled it well for the most part, but there's so many things we can do better... If you ask every person on this offense, they'll tell you there's something individually they can do better." After the loss to Oklahoma, Mack Brown said he did not want to hear about bad luck, "By saying we're unlucky is just a cop-out, this game isn't about luck. If you knock balls loose you should get on them. If you tip balls in the air you should catch them. We're not going to have any excuses." Brown cited the lack of big plays on defense, particularly the lack of forced turnovers, as a problem for Texas. Both Brown and Greg Davis hinted that Jamaal Charles could face less playing time as a result of his problems hanging onto the ball.

=== Iowa State ===
#22 Texas at Iowa State

Team	1	2	3	4	Total
• Texas	14	14	21	7	56
Iowa St	0	3	0	0	3

- Date: October 13
- Location: Jack Trice Stadium, Ames, Iowa
- Game start: 12:30
- Game attendance: 52,060
- TV announcers (FSN): Bill Land, Dave Lapham, Emily Jones

Texas first played Iowa State in 1979, and the Longhorns had won all six matchups coming into the 2007 season. Their last meeting in 2006 concluded with a 37–14 Texas victory. The Cyclones football team was coached by Gene Chizik who was co-defensive coordinator for Texas from 2005 to 2006. Like Texas, the Cyclones were 0–2 in conference play, but they had only a 1–5 record overall. Their lone victory of the season had been against Iowa when they made a game-winning 28-yard field goal with :01 remaining. As with Kansas State, Texas plays the Cyclones two out of every four years as part of the Big 12 Conference schedule.

Despite losses to Kansas State and Oklahoma, Texas remained in the Top 25 coming into the game with Iowa State. The Horns were number 22 in the USA Today coaches poll and number 23 in the Associated Press media poll. Texas extended its streak in the coaches poll to 143 weeks and its streak in the AP poll to 115 weeks. Mack Brown said that he would not change the game plan in facing Chizik but that he needed to adjust sideline signals and snap counts since they were known to the former Texas co-coordinator.

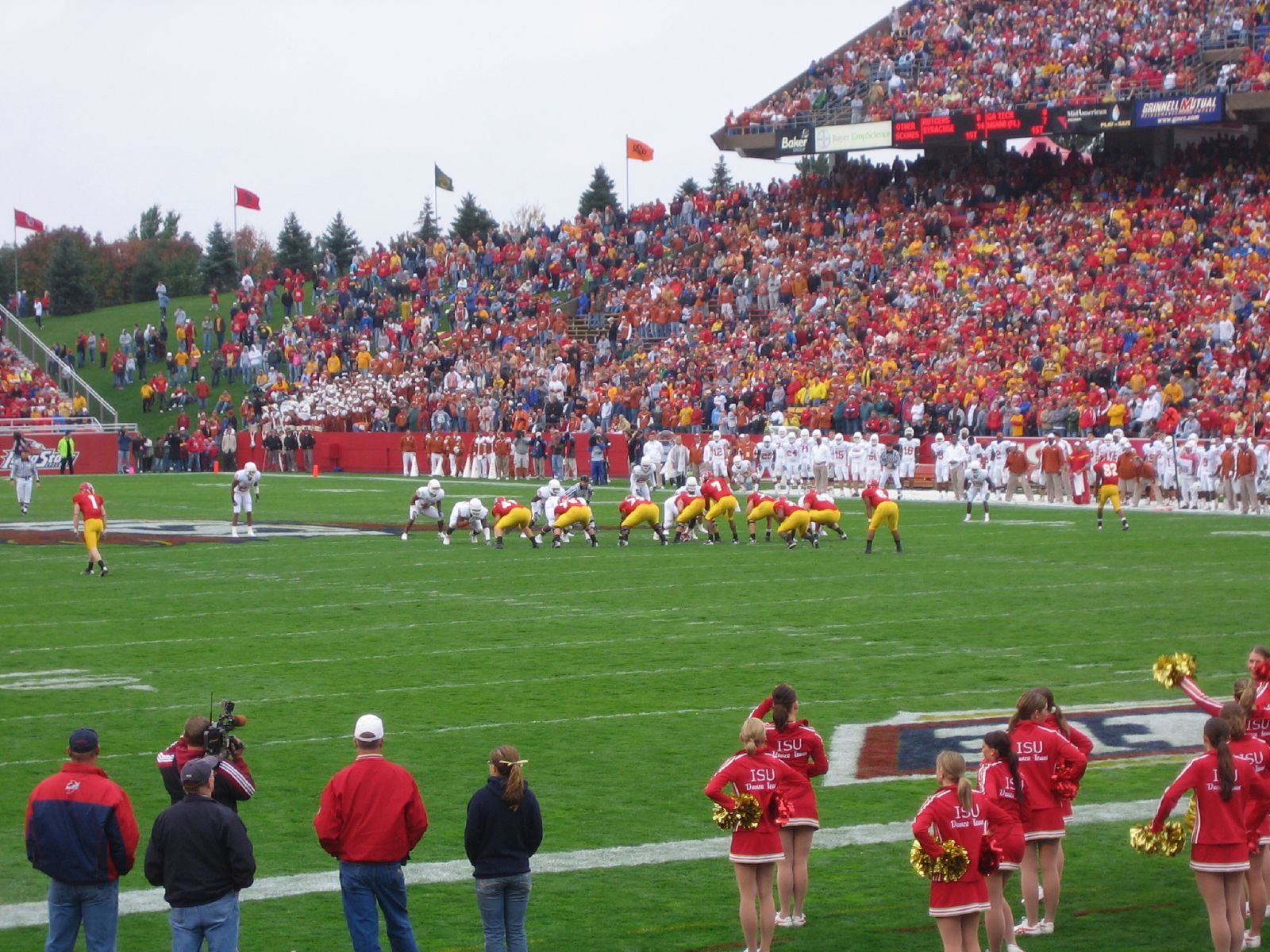
Texas plays defense against the Cyclones.

The Austin American-Statesman predicted Iowa State's quarterback Bret Meyer and wide receiver Todd Blythe would pose the biggest threat for the Longhorns. The paper also called the Cyclones the worst team in the Big 12 North and predicted that Texas would be 2–2 in conference play after facing Iowa State and Baylor, the worst team in the south division. The Daily Texan reported that the game offered an opportunity for Gene Chizik to get a "signature win" if his team could beat Texas. Two days prior to the game, oddsmakers favored Texas to win by 16 points.

The Longhorns were in control from the beginning and routed Iowa State 56–3, the worst loss for the Cyclones since 1997. Iowa State got the ball to start the game and made a first down with a pass from Bret Meyer to Todd Blythe. The UT defense prevented them from gaining another first down and the Cyclones punted from their own 37 yard-line; Texas took over at their 42 yard-line. On the first play from scrimmage, Colt McCoy scrambled away from a blitz and saw that Jordan Shipley had broken off his route and was 10 yards behind any Cyclone defender. Shipley caught the pass from McCoy and sped away from the Cyclones to score a 58-yard touchdown. From that point, the Longhorns never relinquished the lead. They led 14–3 at the end of the first quarter and 28–3 at halftime. In the second half, Texas added another 28–points, en route to a 56–3 blowout.

The Longhorns' success passing the ball eventually gave way to the running game. John Chiles led the Longhorns with 54 yards on 9 carries. McCoy rushed for 50 yards, while Jamaal Charles carried the ball 7 times for 44 yards. The Longhorns finished with 514 total yards – 298 via the air, and 216 on the ground. The Longhorns forced three turnovers, including two interceptions, without surrendering any themselves. Brandon Foster intercepted a pass from Bret Meyer and returned it for a 39-yard touchdown. Deon Beasley also picked off Meyer, who completed only 17 passes for 111 yards and no touchdowns.

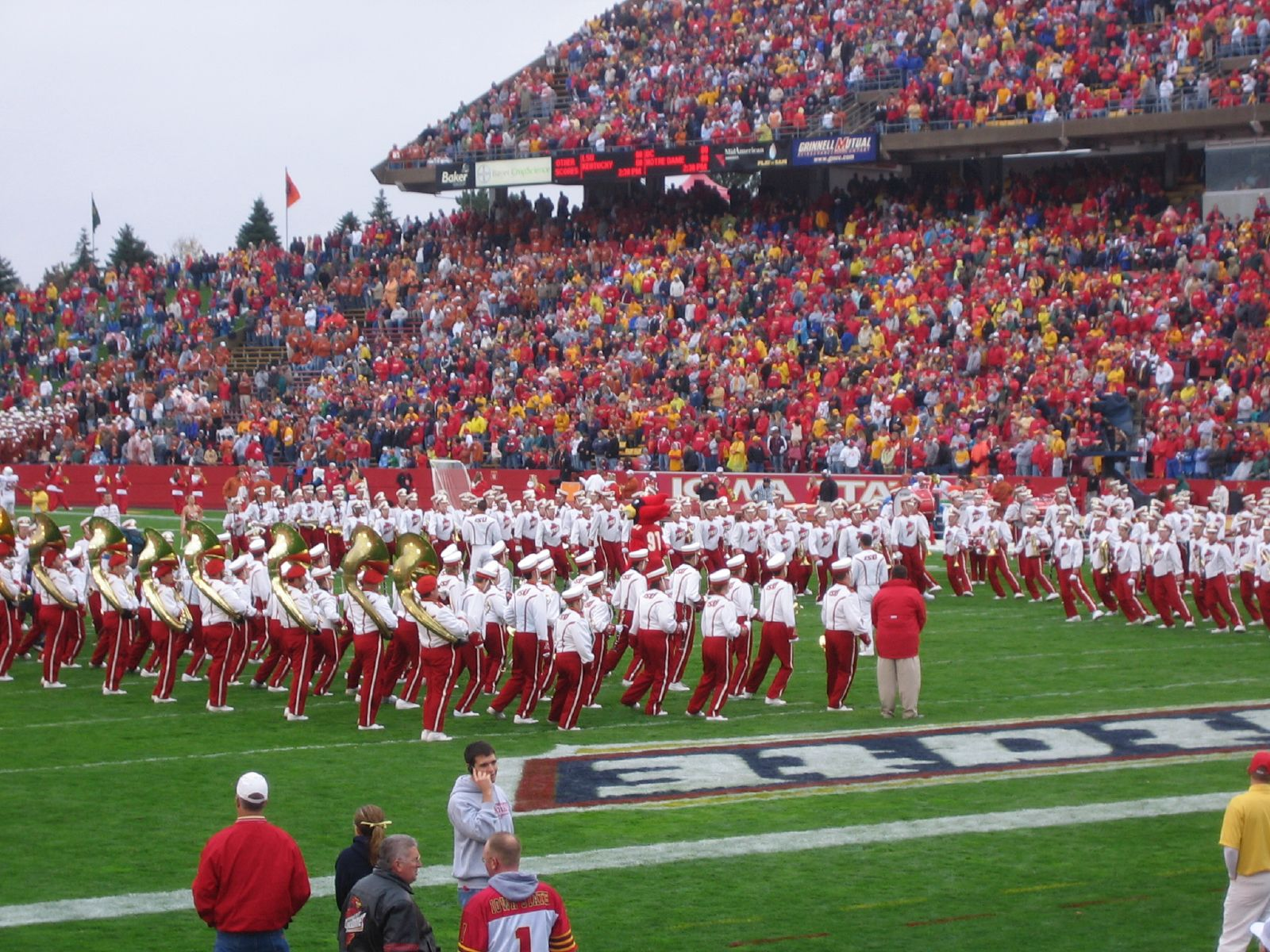
The Iowa State University Cyclone Football "Varsity" Marching Band performs during pregame.

Texas fullback Antwan Cobb sprained his left anterior cruciate ligament late in the game, an injury that sidelined him for the rest of the season. Cobb's injury left the Longhorns without a true fullback, although they had not utilized the position often during the season. The only other fullback on the team, Luke Tiemann, was expected to miss one more week with a wrist injury. Mack Brown said Chris Ogbonnaya, the second-team tailback, would move to fullback for the Baylor game. Freshman tight end Blaine Irby had taken some practice at fullback and could also be used in that position. Robert Killebrew was benched after committing two personal foul penalties, a consistent problem for him in the 2007 season. Without a veteran fullback, Texas planned to either run the ball out of the shotgun formation or simply focus on the passing game.

Representatives from the Holiday Bowl were in attendance. According to the Austin Statesman, one of them said, "We'd love to have Texas, but they're still hoping to wind up at the Fiesta Bowl." In order to reach the Fiesta Bowl, Texas needed Oklahoma to lose two games, giving Texas a spot in the Big 12 Conference Championship game, which Texas would then have to win. Another possibility was for Oklahoma to make it to the National Championship game and Texas being selected for an at-large Bowl Championship Series bid."

=== Baylor ===
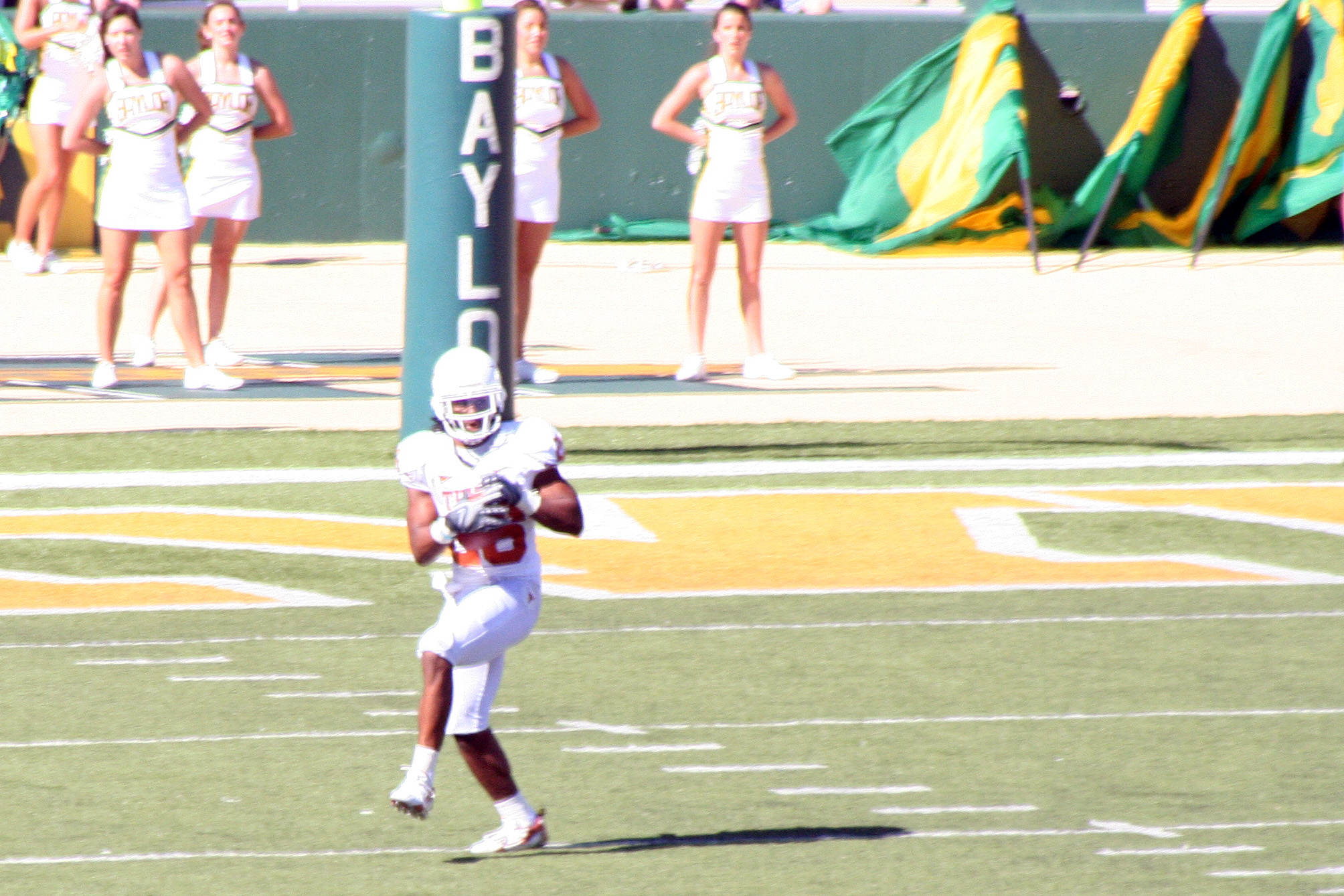
Marcus Griffin catches an interception, which he returned 91 yards for a touchdown.

#18 Texas at Baylor

Team	1	2	3	4	Total
• Texas	3	7	7	14	31
Baylor	0	7	0	3	10

- Date: October 20
- Location: Floyd Casey Stadium, Waco, Texas
- Game start: 12:30
- Game attendance: 41,335
- TV announcers (Versus): Ron Thulin, Kelly Stouffer, Lewis Johnson

The game against Baylor was played in Floyd Casey Stadium in Waco, Texas, approximately 100 miles (161 km) north on Interstate 35 from Austin, the home of the University of Texas. Because home UT games are usually a sell-out, Texas games at Baylor have found numerous Texas fans driving to Waco to watch the game.

The Longhorns first played the Baylor Bears in 1901 and faced them annually during the days of the Southwest Conference. In the 96 meetings through 2006, Texas' record against the Bears was 70 wins, 22 losses, and 4 ties. The rivalry with Baylor is Texas' third-longest by number of games: only Oklahoma and Texas A&M have faced Texas more times on the football field. Texas won the 2006 meeting 63–31.

In the week prior to the 2007 game, Baylor assistant coach Eric Schnupp was charged with a misdemeanor count of disorderly conduct and reckless exposure after he allegedly urinated on the bar of a Waco nightclub. He was suspended indefinitely from the program. Baylor's starting quarterback, Blake Szymanski, was questionable for the game because of a mild concussion he suffered in a game against Kansas. Although Szymanski had been physically cleared to play, back-up quarterbacks Michael Machen and John David Weed were sharing snaps in practice and Baylor coaches said any one of them could get the start against Texas. Two days prior to the game, oddsmakers favored Texas to win by 25 points.

The game was initially a close-fought contest; Texas led by only a touchdown before Deon Beasley intercepted a pass at the Baylor 43-yard line with nine minutes remaining in the game. Texas scored two more touchdowns to outlast the Bears in a 31–10 victory. Texas accumulated 293 passing yards, all by McCoy, compared to 284 by Machen and Weed of Baylor. Vondrell McGee was the leading rusher for Texas, contributing 57 of the team's 177 yards. Baylor's Jay Finley was the Bears' leading rusher, but Baylor was held to only 8 yards rushing overall because of the sacks forced by the Texas defense. It was the tenth straight victory for UT over Baylor.

=== Nebraska ===
Nebraska at #16 Texas

Team	1	2	3	4	Total
Nebraska	0	10	7	8	25
• Texas	3	0	6	19	28

- Date: October 27
- Location: Darrell K Royal–Texas Memorial Stadium, Austin, Texas
- Game start: 3:30
- Game attendance: 85,968
- TV announcers (ABC): Ron Franklin, Ed Cunningham, Jack Arute

Texas first played the Nebraska Cornhuskers in 1933, and the Longhorns held a 7–4–0 record against Nebraska though 2006. As with Kansas State and Iowa State, Texas plays the Cornhuskers two out of every four years as part of the Big 12 Conference schedule.

On the morning of the game, oddsmakers favored Texas to win by 21 points. The weather forecast called for a high of 76 °F (24 °C) and sunshine with winds NNE at 10 miles per hour (16 km/h) to 15 miles per hour (24 km/h). Texas stuck with their passing game for three quarters and was trailed Nebraska most of the way; the Cornhuskers led 17–9 to start the fourth quarter. The Associated Press reported, "Once Texas figured out it should be running against one of the nation's worst run defenses, things turned out all right for the Longhorns."

Early in the fourth quarter, McCoy took a hard hit as he scrambled outside the pocket. He was shaken up badly enough to leave the game for a play. John Chiles came in at quarterback; his one play, a zone-read handoff to Jamaal Charles, produced 24 yards. According to the Associated Press recap of the game, "suddenly Texas had figured out how to beat a Cornhuskers' team that had been steamrolled on the ground in recent weeks. Texas only threw three passes in the fourth quarter."

Once Texas switched to the zone read offense, they quickly started gaining yards and points. Charles ran for a career-high 290 yards, including 216 yards and three long touchdown runs in the fourth quarter. His tally also set a new record for rushing against the Cornhuskers, surpassing the old record of 247 yards by Oklahoma's Billy Simms. Charles explained "It was my time to show everyone what I can do. When I saw a hole, I blasted through it." Texas finished with 181 yards passing and 364 yards rushing; Nebraska had 315 yards passing and 132 yards rushing. The running back was named the Walter Camp Football Foundation National Offensive Player of the Week.

The game was a milestone for one coach and a millstone for another; it was the 100th win for Mack Brown at Texas; and it put more pressure on beleaguered Nebraska coach Bill Callahan. Brown remarked on his victory, "A hundred is nice. I knew the game was going to come down like it did. It didn't surprise me. They made sure that I'll remember it the rest of my life." Callahan was fired five weeks later.

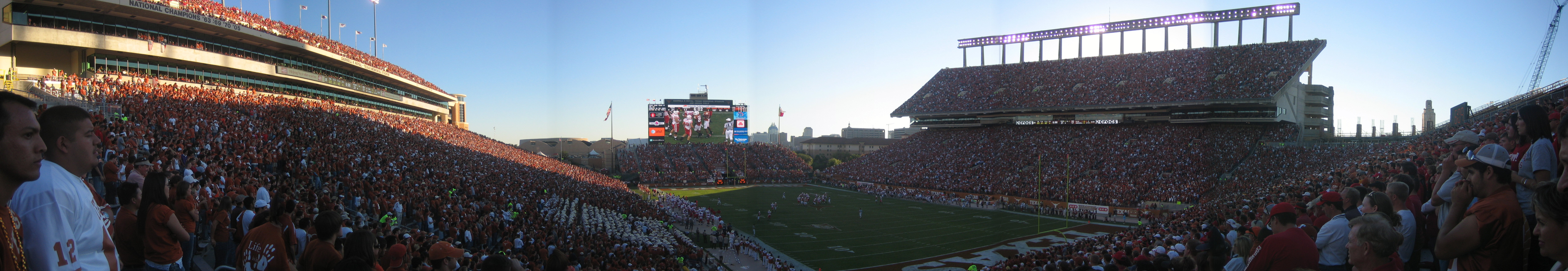
A panorama of Darrell K Royal–Texas Memorial Stadium during the Nebraska game.

=== Oklahoma State ===
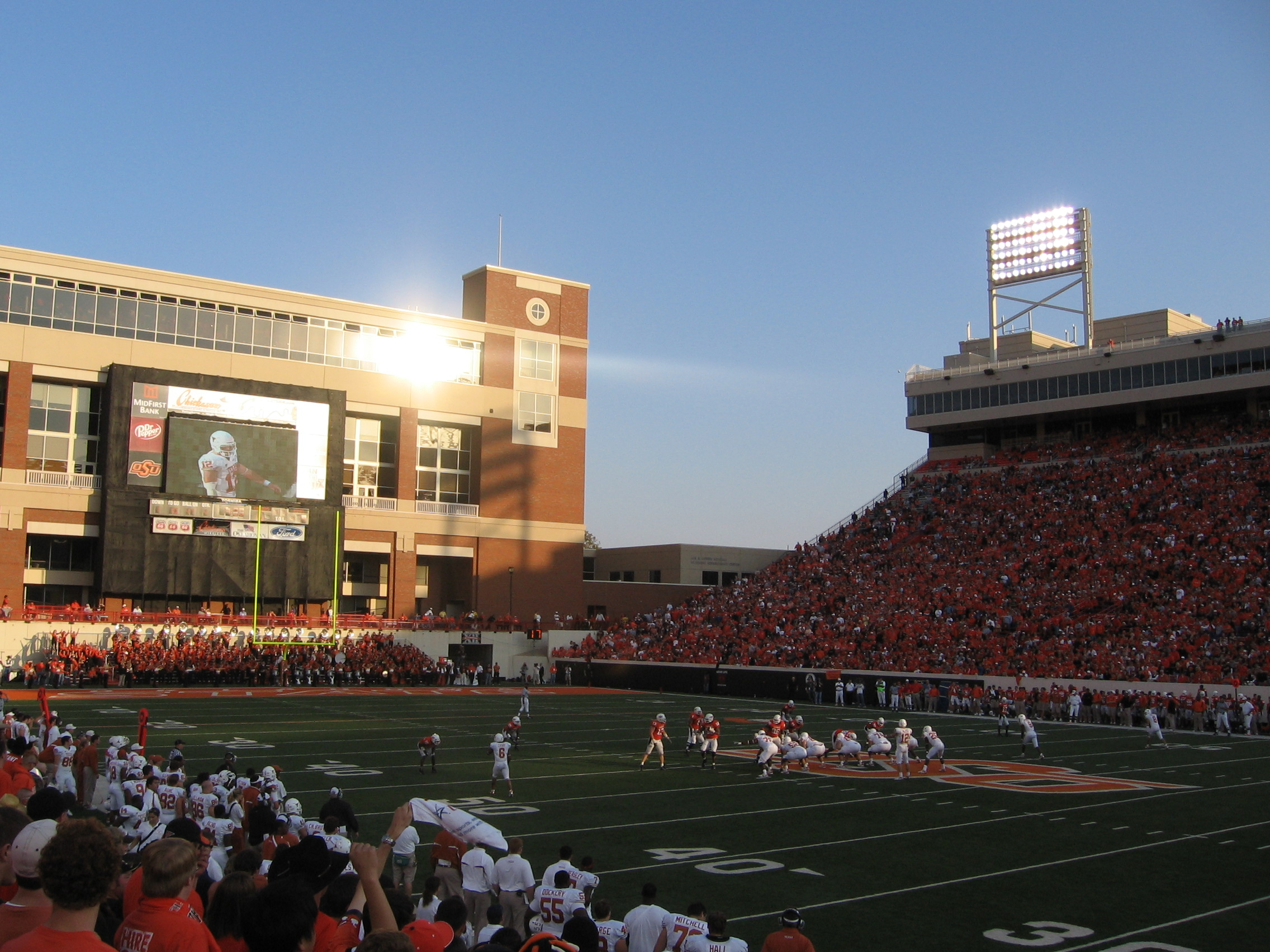
Texas and OSU prepare for a play as Colt McCoy is displayed on the jumbotron behind the field.

#12 Texas at Oklahoma State

Team	1	2	3	4	Total
• Texas	0	14	0	24	38
Oklahoma State	14	14	7	0	35

- Date: November 3
- Location: Boone Pickens Stadium, Stillwater, Oklahoma
- Game start: 3:30
- Game attendance: 41,406
- TV announcers (ABC): Dave LaMont, Jesse Palmer, Vince Welch

From 1916 through 2006, Texas had played the Oklahoma State Cowboys football (OSU) program 21 times and held a 19–2–0 record. Texas came into the 2007 game with a nine-game active winning streak against OSU. The Cowboys' only two victories occurred in 1944 and 1997. The day before the 2007 game, oddsmakers favored Texas to win by 3 points. The pre-game festivities included an appearance by Challenger, the first bald eagle ever trained to free-fly into sports stadiums, and a fly-over by four F-16 Fighting Falcons from the Oklahoma Air National Guard's 138th Fighter Wing piloted by Oklahoma State alumni.

In the 2007 game, Oklahoma State took an early lead and led 35–14 at the start of the fourth quarter. For the fourth time in five years, the Longhorns staged a big rally to win the game. This time, Texas overcame a 21-point fourth quarter deficit to win by three points as time expired in the game. It was the biggest fourth-quarter comeback in Texas Longhorn history.

Fox Sports selected Jamaal Charles and Jacob Lacey as their players of the game for Texas and Oklahoma State, respectively. Charles averaged 11.3 yards per carry. ESPN remarked, "For the second straight week, Jammal Charles led a late charge for the 15th-ranked Longhorns. He scored two of his three touchdowns in the fourth quarter as Texas (No. 14 AP) outscored Oklahoma State 24–0 in the final 15 minutes." OSU's leading rusher was Dantrell Savage with 102 yards and one touchdown on 23 carries. McCoy was 20 of 28 passing attempts for 283 yards. He had one touchdown pass and three interceptions; he also rushed for 105 yards. Zac Robinson was 30 of 42 for 427 yards, one touchdown, and no interceptions. Robinson's passing yardage broke the school record, previously held by current head-coach Mike Gundy. Together, the teams had 1,170 yards of offense. The 594 yards allowed by Texas was the most in the 2007 season. Oklahoma State ran 87 plays and used 35:11 minutes of ball possession, compared to 70 plays and 24:49 for Texas.

The Longhorns suffered several injuries during the game. According to the Austin American-Statesman, "Center Dallas Griffin left the game with a knee injury, linebacker Jared Norton left with a right shoulder injury and Eddie Jones left with a shoulder injury. Brandon Foster injured his chest in the third quarter, and Drew Kelson left the game with a left knee injury." The paper also reported that Griffin's removal from the game may have contributed to several mistakes in snapping the ball to McCoy and that UT might not have been able to win if any of the resulting handling mistakes had been picked up by OSU.

=== Texas Tech ===
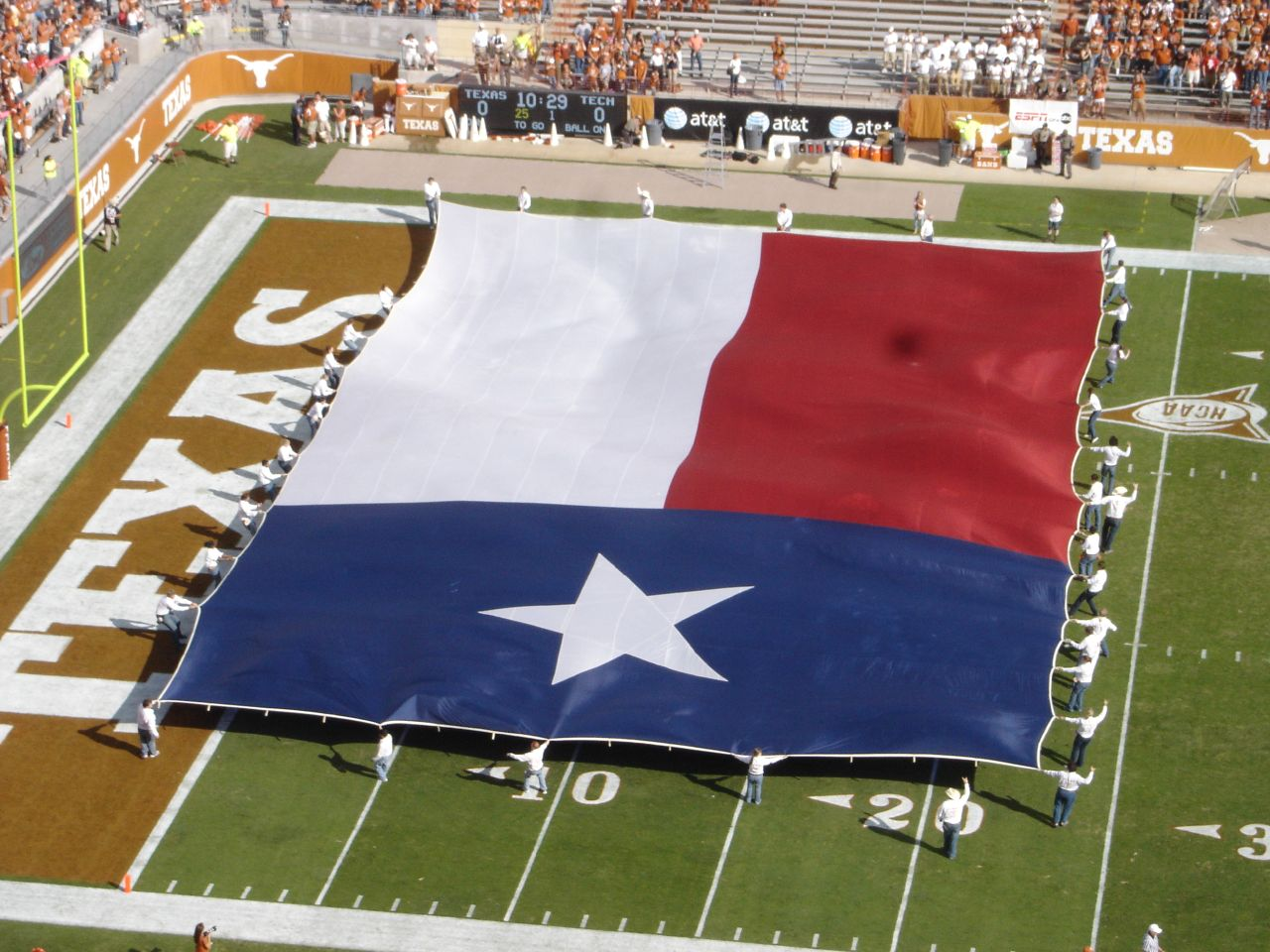
The World's Largest Texas Flag is unveiled on the field prior to kickoff against Texas Tech.

Texas Tech at #14 Texas

Team	1	2	3	4	Total
Texas Tech	3	17	0	23	43
• Texas	14	14	7	24	59

- Date: November 10
- Location: Darrell K Royal–Texas Memorial Stadium, Austin, Texas
- Game start: 3:30
- Game attendance: 86,401
- TV announcers (ABC): Ron Franklin, Ed Cunningham, Jack Arute

Texas' rivalry with the Texas Tech Red Raiders began in 1928 and through 2006, the Longhorns were 42–14–0 against Tech. In the 2006 contest, fifth-ranked Texas barely came away with a 35–31 win over an unranked Texas Tech team. Two days before the 2007 game, oddsmakers favored Texas to win by 6½ points. Pre-game speculation continued about what bowl game might select Texas. Various media predictions included the Gator Bowl, Cotton Bowl Classic, and Holiday Bowl. Holiday Bowl executive director Bruce Binkowski said his bowl would be very interested in pitting Texas against the USC Trojans, whom Texas defeated in the 2006 Rose Bowl. A BCS bowl was also still mentioned as a possibility, with Sports Illustrated saying the Orange Bowl could take Texas.

Texas Center Dallas Griffin injured his anterior cruciate ligament against Oklahoma State and was out for the season. Griffin was a senior, meaning his career with the Longhorns ended due to the injury. Backup defensive end Eddie Jones and reserve safety Drew Kelson were also out for the game against Texas Tech. Linebackers Jared Norton and Sergio Kindle were listed as "questionable" and "probable", respectively.

The Red Raiders were 7–3 on the season and 3–3 in the Big 12 after beating Baylor 37–7 in their most recent game. Quarterback Graham Harrell passed for over 4,000 yards for the second season in a row, becoming the fifth quarterback in NCAA Division I-FBS (formerly Division I-A) to have multiple 4,000-yard seasons. The Austin American-Statesman reported, "Defensively, Texas must hope that the injured are quick healers because it's a given that the Longhorns will need every available body against the Red Raiders. Texas Tech fields the most dynamic passing offense in the country, and the Red Raiders also stay on the field an average of 77.3 plays per game. Tech further frustrates a defense by often going for fourth downs. They've been successful on 14 of 23 fourth-down attempts this season. A year ago, Tech was one of three on fourth downs in a 35-31 loss to Texas."

With the game falling on Veterans Day weekend, a pre-game ceremony honored veterans and commemorated the 60th year of Texas' ROTC program. Four army helicopters from Fort Hood flew over the stadium after the national anthem. It was also Senior Day for Texas, with 25 players making their last home game appearance. As a group, they had a 42–6 record coming into the game, which represented the third-highest win total for any Texas class. The temperature at kickoff was 84 degrees.

On their first offensive series, the Horns scored a touchdown on a pass from McCoy to Shipley. Their defense held Tech to a field goal. Texas offensive tackle Tony Hills injured his leg and left the game on a cart. Texas scored another touchdown on a run by Vondrell McGee to create a 14–3 lead at the end of the first quarter. Tech's Graham Harrell threw a touchdown pass and Texas answered with a rushing touchdown. On the ensuing kick, Texas used a pooch kick which was tipped by a Texas Tech player. The Longhorns' kickoff team recovered the ball, helping put their offense to rush for another touchdown. Tech brought the game to 28–20 with another touchdown. Texas drove into field goal range but tried to throw a touchdown pass with 11 seconds remaining in the half. The pass was intercepted for a touchback and the Red Raiders ran a short play to end the half.

Jamal Charles and tight end Jermichael Finley were injured in the second half but were able to return. In the fourth quarter, McCoy suffered a cut to his head but he did not miss any plays due to the injury. McCoy threw for four touchdowns and ran for two more. Both teams kept running their first team offense until late in the game; they combined for 47 points in the final 12 minutes and each scored a touchdown within the final two minutes of play. Tech attempted two onside kicks in an effort to come from behind, but Texas recovered both kicks.

During his post-game press conference, Texas Tech head coach Mike Leach excoriated the officiating crew for incompetence and bias. He speculated that the officials may have favored Texas because the head official lived in Austin, because the officials were incompetent, or because the conference wanted Texas to appear in a BCS bowl because of the increased appearance fees that such a bowl generates for the conference. Jim Vertuno of the Associated Press wrote "Leach was upset officials disallowed two Tech touchdowns in the third quarter. The first was overruled when video replay clearly showed the receiver let the ball hit the ground. On the next play, a touchdown pass was negated by a holding penalty. Leach also wanted, but didn't get, a flag for roughing the quarterback." The Lubbock Avalanche-Journal reported, "Big 12 policy prohibits coaches from commenting publicly about game officials, so Leach's actions leave him open to reprimand, fine or worse." ESPN reported, "Leach's rant will likely draw a fine from the league and possibly a suspension." The Big 12 fined Leach $10,000, the largest fine in conference history.

The win ensured that 2007 was the 10th straight season the Longhorns won nine or more games, a record streak for the Horns. Including Mack Brown's final two seasons at North Carolina, Brown became the only coach in the nation to lead his program to nine or more victories in 12 straight seasons.

=== Texas A&M ===
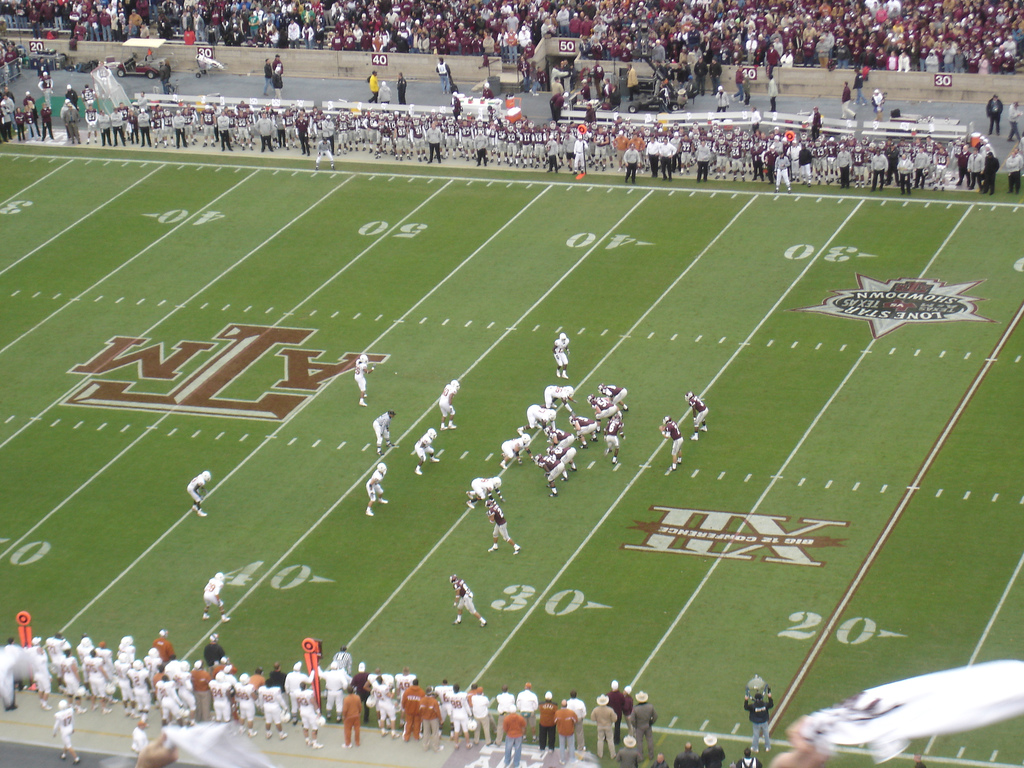
Texas on defense vs. Texas A&M

#13 Texas at Texas A&M

Team	1	2	3	4	Total
Texas	0	3	14	13	30
• Texas A&M	10	7	7	14	38

- Date: November 23
- Location: Kyle Field, College Station, Texas
- Game start: 3:30
- Game attendance: 88,253
- TV announcers (ABC): Ron Franklin, Ed Cunningham, Jack Arute

This game marked the 114th meeting between the Aggies and the Texas Longhorns and was the fourth year of a multi-sport rivalry named the Lone Star Showdown. The football rivalry began in 1894 and continues to be the longest-running rivalry for both the Longhorns and the Aggies; it is the third-longest rivalry in NCAA Division I FBS (formerly Division I-A) football. Texas A&M came into the 2007 contest with a 35–73–5 record against Texas. Since the series began in 1894, the game has traditionally been played on Thanksgiving Day or Thanksgiving weekend. The 2007 game marks the fourteenth straight game to be scheduled the day after Thanksgiving.

The Aggies scored on their opening possession with a 35-yard touchdown with a screen pass from Stephen McGee to Mike Goodson. The Longhorns mustered two first downs, but were forced to punt. Texas A&M ended their subsequent drive three plays later with a punt of their own. The Longhorns again successfully penetrated into Texas A&M territory, but Mack Brown opted to call a pooch punt by Colt McCoy on fourth down and four from the Aggie 37-yard line. The Aggies answered with an eighteen-play drive that stalled on the Texas-14 yard line and the Aggies had to settle for a 31-yard field goal by Matt Szymanski.

The second quarter started with the Longhorns driving only six yards and being forced to punt again. The Aggies continued to press their advantage and drove down the field until Stephen McGee threw an ill-timed pass that was intercepted by Deon Beasley at the Longhorn 25. Two first-downs later, Texas was forced to punt and pinned Texas A&M on their own five yard line. Stephen McGee led the offense with several long passes and the Aggies drove to the Texas 5 but again were held short on 3rd down. On 4th and three, the Aggies faked the field goal and the placeholder, T.J. Sanders, ran the ball in for his first career touchdown giving the Aggies a 17–0 lead. The Longhorns started their next drive on their own 20-yard line, where Colt McCoy threw a 62-yard pass to Jamaal Charles. The drive stalled and the Longhorns had to settle for a field goal and went to halftime trailing their arch-rival, 17–3.

The third quarter started with promising drives by both teams, each ending when the ball was intercepted. Brandon Foster ran the Longhorns' interception back to the A&M eight-yard line and Texas scored a touchdown on the next play to pull the Longhorns within seven points. The Aggies drove to the Texas 34 yard line, but the drive stalled out and Texas took over on downs as the fourth-down attempt failed. Colt McCoy fumbled a few plays later to give the ball back to Texas A&M. Five plays later, Stephen McGee scampered into the end zone for a five-yard touchdown to put the Aggies up 24–10. The Longhorns took little time to answer with a touchdown of their own. Quan Cosby returned the following kickoff 91 yards for a touchdown to pull Texas within seven once again. The next drive started on the Aggie 49-yard line, courtesy of a 42-yard kickoff return by E.J. Shankle. The quarter ended on a seven-yard pass to Mike Goodson.

The final quarter of play began with A&M still moving the ball. Stephen McGee threw a 44-yard pass to Mike Goodson for a touchdown to put the Aggies ahead by the score of 31–17. The Longhorns again went three and out and were forced to punt. The Aggies went down the field quickly and scored another touchdown on a 66-yard pass completion to Earvin Taylor, putting Texas A&M up by 21 points. Colt McCoy fumbled the ball two plays later, but A&M was forced to punt the ball away three plays after recovering the fumble. McCoy and the Longhorn offense drove the length of the field to score a touchdown, taking only 99 seconds off the clock in the process. The Aggies lost seven yards over the next three plays and were forced again to punt. The Longhorns drove 73 yards from their own 27, converted two fourth downs, and scored a touchdown. Ryan Bailey missed the extra point, but left the Longhorns only down by eight points. The Aggies took possession on their own 33 and ran the clock out to win the game, 38–30.

During the postgame celebration, ABC commentator Jack Arute asked Dennis Franchione whether he would return to the team the following year. Coach Franchione responded by asking the announcer to let the players enjoy their victory. At the beginning of the subsequent press conference, Coach Franchione announced his resignation, effective immediately. Shortly thereafter, Texas A&M announced defensive coordinator Gary Darnell would lead the Aggies in their bowl game.

=== Holiday Bowl ===
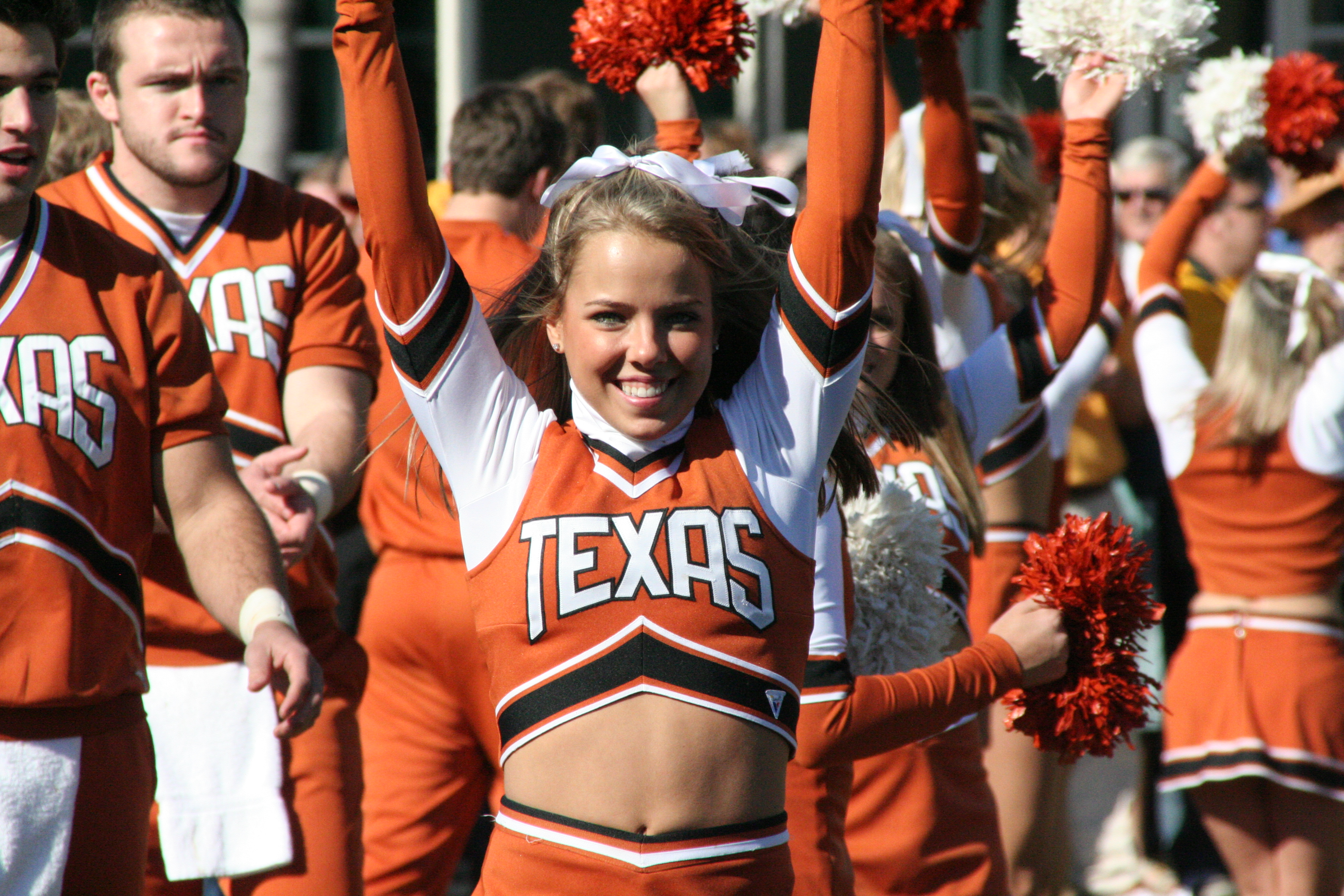
UT cheerleaders perform at the Battle of the Bands, one of the events leading up to the 2007 Holiday Bowl.

#11 Arizona State vs. #17 Texas

Team	1	2	3	4	Total
Arizona State	0	10	10	14	34
• Texas	21	7	7	17	52

- Date: Thursday, December 27
- Location: Qualcomm Stadium, San Diego
- Game start: 7:00 p.m. CST
- Game attendance: 64,020
- TV announcers (ESPN): Brent Musburger, Kirk Herbstreit, Lisa Salters

Scoring summary
1	13:39	Texas	Derek Lokey 2-yard pass from Colt McCoy (Ryan Bailey kick)	Texas 7-0
1	7:08	Texas	John Chiles 4-yard run (Ryan Bailey kick)	Texas 14-0
1	1:30	Texas	Jamaal Charles 15-yard run (Ryan Bailey kick)	Texas 21-0
2	12:36	Arizona St	Chris McGaha 7-yard pass from Rudy Carpenter (Thomas Weber kick)	Texas 21-7
2	4:43	Texas	Colt McCoy 9-yard run (Ryan Bailey kick)	Texas 28-7
2	0:35	Arizona St	Thomas Weber 32-yard field goal	Texas 28-10
3	11:49	Arizona St	Thomas Weber 46-yard field goal	Texas 28-13
3	3:33	Texas	Jermichael Finley recovered fumble in end zone (Ryan Bailey kick)	Texas 35-13
3	2:49	Arizona St	Michael Jones 22-yard pass from Rudy Carpenter (Thomas Weber kick)	Texas 35-20
4	12:55	Texas	Ryan Bailey 21-yard field goal	Texas 38-20
4	11:03	Texas	Vondrell McGee 28-yard run (Ryan Bailey kick)	Texas 45-20
4	8:55	Arizona St	Michael Jones 10-yard pass from Danny Sullivan (Thomas Weber kick)	Texas 45-27
4	3:42	Arizona St	Jarell Woods 3-yard run (Thomas Weber kick)	Texas 45-34
4	2:24	Texas	Jamaal Charles 32-yard run (Ryan Bailey kick)	Texas 52-34

The Longhorns concluded the season in the 2007 Holiday Bowl on December 27 against the Arizona State Sun Devils.

With the loss to Texas A&M, the Longhorns fell out of contention for a Bowl Championship Series game; their bowl situation was to be decided largely by the play of other Big 12 teams. Number four Missouri beat number two Kansas to win the Big 12 North Division. Missouri rose to the top spot in the BCS rankings prior to facing Oklahoma in the Big 12 Championship game. Oklahoma won the game to become the Big 12 Conference champion and secure a berth in the 2008 Fiesta Bowl. Even though Missouri defeated Kansas, won their division, and outranked Kansas in the BCS standings (sixth compared to eighth) the Orange Bowl selected Kansas instead of Missouri to play in the 2008 Orange Bowl. The Tigers were invited to play in the 2008 Cotton Bowl Classic; the Cotton Bowl Classic had first pick of Big 12 teams after BCS bowls have made their selections. The Holiday Bowl had the next selection and chose Texas.

Arizona State University was ranked number 11 in the BCS standings; they completed a 10–2 regular season and won a share of the Pac-10 Conference Championship. The Sun Devils finished the regular season ranked number 11 in the final BCS rankings, number 11 in Coaches poll and number 12 in the AP rankings while Texas was number 19 in the BCS and number 17 in both the coaches and AP rankings. The Sun Devils were eligible for a BCS bowl themselves, but like Missouri, ASU was left out of the BCS selections.

Texas dominated the first quarter and set two Holiday Bowl records. The Longhorns' first score, a two-yard pass from Colt McCoy to nose tackle Derek Lokey, was the quickest in game history, and took place with 13:39 remaining in the first quarter. The Longhorns scored 21 points in the first quarter—two more than previous record-holder SMU scored against BYU in 1980. Texas' defense forced two turnovers and held the Sun Devils scoreless for the period.

The game included one of the most bizarre plays of the football season. ASU's Rudy Carpenter fumbled the ball as ASU was close to scoring a touchdown. Chris Jessee, a member of the Longhorns football operations staff and Mack Brown's stepson, stepped onto the field and may or may not have touched the ball as it bounced near the sideline. The ball was recovered by Texas, seemingly preventing an ASU touchdown. However, after a twelve‑minute review, the officials awarded the ball to Arizona State; the Sun Devils scored a touchdown on the next play.

The Longhorns won the game, 52–34. The 52 points were the most ever scored by the Longhorns in a bowl game. Joseph Duarte of the Houston Chronicle called the Holiday Bowl the "biggest victory of the season in what could serve as a springboard for a preseason Top 10 ranking next season."

== After the season ==
Two Longhorns were named to postseason All-American lists. Marcus Griffin was selected to the ESPN list and Tony Hills was selected by the Walter Camp Football Foundation.

Towards the end of the season, speculation intensified about which players might enter professional football though the 2008 NFL draft. In November, Jamaal Charles said he would return for his senior season rather than enter professional football in the NFL. In December, sources reported Charles and Jermichael Finley had filed paperwork with the NFL to evaluate their draft potential if they decided to enter professional football in the NFL Draft instead of returning for their senior season. Quan Cosby, who spent three years in professional baseball, was reported to be still deciding whether to file the paperwork. Defensive tackle Roy Miller said he would definitely be back for his senior season. Mack Brown did not comment about specific players but said, "We always try to help our guys get as much information as possible when it comes to the NFL. We encourage and help them go through the process ... All of our underclassmen have told us they will be coming back, but if you're playing well enough to be considered an NFL prospect, going through the process can only help you better understand it and realize what you need to work on to improve your status." Charles said he would not go pro unless he was predicted to be chosen in the first round of the draft. After the Holiday Bowl Charles said, "Right now, I'm probably coming back. I didn't think I did that good in the game. Next year maybe I'll be up for the Heisman. I will come back." From 2000 to 2007, the Longhorns have had seven players taken in the first 10 picks of the NFL draft, more than any other school.

On January 2, 2008, Charles announced that he was rescinding his earlier decision and would leave Texas for the NFL. Despite skipping his senior year, Charles ranks fourth on the list of total rushing yards by a UT player, behind Ricky Williams, Cedric Benson, and Earl Campbell, with 3,328 yards. Williams and Campbell each won the Heisman Trophy in their senior seasons. With Charles' departure, quarterback Colt McCoy becomes the leading returning rusher for the Longhorns. Tight end Jermichael Finley also declared he would forgo his senior season to enter the NFL.

The draft concluded with five Longhorns selected: Limas Sweed (53rd pick), Jamaal Charles (73rd), Jermichael Finley (91st), Tony Hills (130th), and Frank Okam (151st). In addition, Brandon Foster, Marcus Griffin, Nate Jones and Derek Lokey agreed to sign free-agent contracts with NFL teams.

On January 2, 2008, the Longhorns announced that defensive co-coordinator Larry MacDuff would not return for the 2008 season and Duane Akina was demoted to "Assistant Head Coach/Defensive Backs". The Longhorns hired Will Muschamp as defensive coordinator; he will also coach UT's linebackers. Muschamp was defensive coordinator at Auburn University and will earn a $425,000 salary at Texas. Running backs coach Ken Rucker transferred to a newly created position with the athletic department where he will act as a liaison to high school athletic programs. On January 16, 2008, Texas replaced Rucker by hiring former UT quarterback Major Applewhite.
