= 2007 Missouri Tigers football team =

American college football season

2007 Missouri Tigers football

National champion (Anderson & Hester) Big 12 North co-champion Cotton Bowl Classic champion

Big 12 Championship, L 17–38 vs. Oklahoma

Cotton Bowl Classic, W 38–7 vs. Arkansas
- Conference: Big 12 Conference
- North Division

Ranking
- Coaches: No. 5
- AP: No. 4
- Record: 12–2 (7–1 Big 12)
- Head coach: Gary Pinkel (7th season)
- Offensive coordinator: Dave Christensen (7th season)
- Offensive scheme: Spread
- Defensive coordinator: Matt Eberflus (7th season)
- Base defense: 4–3
- Home stadium: Faurot Field

2007 Big 12 Conference football standings
	Conf.			Overall
Team	W		L	W		L
North Division
No. 4 Missouri xy	7	–	1	12	–	2
No. 7 Kansas x%	7	–	1	12	–	1
Colorado	4	–	4	6	–	7
Kansas State	3	–	5	5	–	7
Nebraska	2	–	6	5	–	7
Iowa State	2	–	6	3	–	9
South Division
No. 8 Oklahoma xy$	6	–	2	11	–	3
No. 10 Texas	5	–	3	10	–	3
No. 22 Texas Tech	4	–	4	9	–	4
Oklahoma State	4	–	4	7	–	6
Texas A&M	4	–	4	7	–	6
Baylor	0	–	8	3	–	9
Championship: Oklahoma 38, Missouri 17
$ – BCS representative as conference champion; % – BCS at-large representative; x – Division champion/co-champions; y – Championship game participant; Rankings from AP Poll

The 2007 Missouri Tigers football team represented the University of Missouri in the 2007 NCAA Division I FBS football season. The team was coached by Gary Pinkel and played their home games at Faurot Field at Memorial Stadium.

The team was led by junior quarterback Chase Daniel, a Heisman Trophy candidate who finished fourth in voting behind Tim Tebow, Darren McFadden, and Colt Brennan. In the preseason, the Tigers were picked by some to win the Big 12 North.

On November 24, Missouri won their 11th game of the season by beating their arch-rival Kansas Jayhawks 36–28, in the Border Showdown at Arrowhead Stadium in Kansas City, Missouri. The victory sealed Mizzou's berth into the 2007 Big 12 Championship Game against Oklahoma.

The Tigers won over 9 games in a season for the first time since 1969, and were ranked No. 1 in the AP Poll for the first time since 1960. This ranking lead to the Tigers' first ever appearance on the cover of Sports Illustrated magazine. The Tigers also achieved their highest BCS ranking in history, at No. 1 after the Border Showdown.

After losing the Big 12 Championship game 38–17 to the Sooners, Missouri was chosen to play Arkansas in the Cotton Bowl Classic in Dallas, in which the Tigers prevailed 38–7 to complete their 12–2 season.

Five Tiger starters were named to the Associated Press All-American teams. Senior tight end Martin Rucker and freshman wide receiver Jeremy Maclin (as an all-purpose player) were named as first team selections, while junior quarterback Chase Daniel and junior safety William Moore were named to the second team. Senior center Adam Spieker was a third team selection.

The Tigers finished the 2007 season ranked 4th in the AP Poll and 5th in the Coaches Poll. The Anderson & Hester rankings listed the team as National Champions; however, the school does not claim the title.

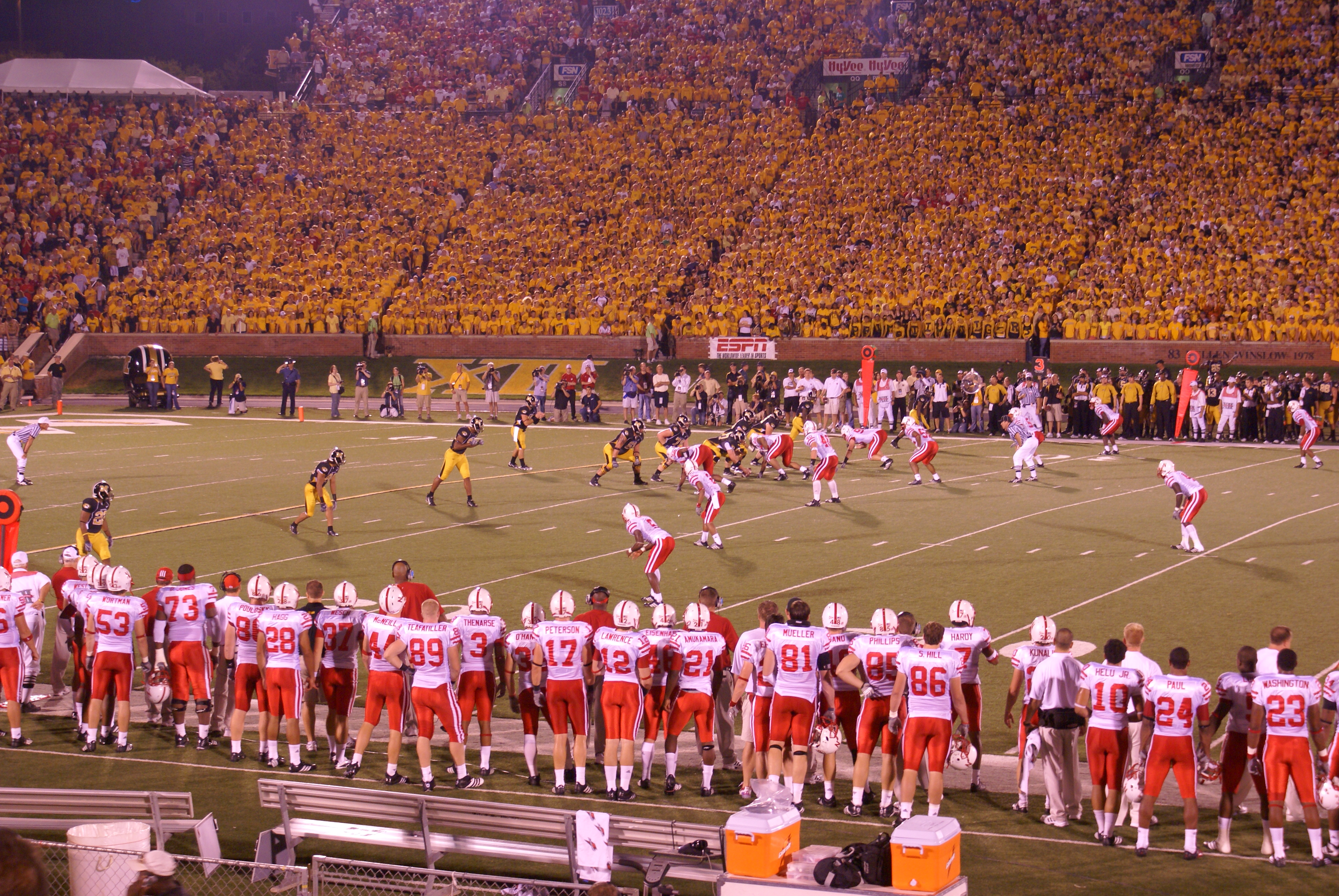
Chase Daniel takes a snap in the first quarter of the 2007 Mizzou vs. Nebraska football game. Missouri won the game on Saturday, October 6, 41–6

== Schedule ==
Date	Time	Opponent	Rank	Site	TV	Result	Attendance	Source
September 1	2:30 p.m.	vs. Illinois*		Edward Jones Dome; St. Louis, MO (rivalry)	ESPN2	W 40–34	62,352	
September 8	5:00 p.m.	at Ole Miss*		Vaught–Hemingway Stadium; Oxford, MS		W 38–25	50,897	
September 15	1:00 p.m.	Western Michigan*		Faurot Field; Columbia, MO		W 52–24	53,480	
September 22	1:00 p.m.	No. 14 (FCS) Illinois State*	No. 25	Faurot Field; Columbia, MO		W 38–17	56,137	
October 6	8:15 p.m.	No. 25 Nebraska	No. 17	Faurot Field; Columbia, MO (rivalry)	ESPN	W 41–6	70,049	
October 13	5:30 p.m.	at No. 6 Oklahoma	No. 11	Oklahoma Memorial Stadium; Norman, OK (rivalry, College GameDay)	FSN	L 31–41	85,041	
October 20	2:30 p.m.	No. 22 Texas Tech^{†}	No. 15	Faurot Field; Columbia, MO	ABC	W 41–10	63,396	
October 27	1:00 p.m.	Iowa State	No. 13	Faurot Field; Columbia, MO (rivalry)		W 42–28	53,386	
November 3	5:30 p.m.	at Colorado	No. 9	Folsom Field; Boulder, CO	FSN	W 55–10	51,483	
November 10	11:30 a.m.	Texas A&M	No. 7	Faurot Field; Columbia, MO	FSN	W 40–26	64,945	
November 17	11:30 a.m.	at Kansas State	No. 6	Bill Snyder Family Football Stadium; Manhattan, KS	FSN	W 49–32	48,406	
November 24	7:00 p.m.	vs. No. 2 Kansas	No. 3	Arrowhead Stadium; Kansas City, MO (Border War, College GameDay)	ABC	W 36–28	80,537	
December 1	7:00 p.m.	vs. No. 9 Oklahoma	No. 1	Alamodome; San Antonio, TX (Big 12 Championship Game)	ABC	L 17–38	62,585	
January 1, 2008	10:40 a.m.	vs. No. 25 Arkansas*	No. 7	Cotton Bowl; Dallas, TX (Cotton Bowl Classic, rivalry)	Fox	W 38–7	73,114	
*Non-conference game; ^{†}Homecoming; Rankings from AP Poll released prior to the game; All times are in Central time

== Game summaries ==
=== Vs. Illinois ===
Missouri Tigers vs. Illinois Fighting Illini – Game summary

Quarter	1	2	3	4	Total
Tigers	7	16	14	3	40
Fighting Illini	6	0	21	7	34

at Edward Jones Dome, St. Louis, Missouri

- Date: September 1
- Game time: 2:30 p.m. CDT
- Game weather: None (played indoors)
- Game attendance: 62,352
- Referee: John Bible
- TV announcers (ESPN2): Dave Pasch, Andre Ware, Jimmy Dykes
- Box score, Recap

Game information
First quarter
- ILL – Vontae Davis 2-yard blocked punt return (kick blocked), 8:38. Fighting Illini 6–0.
- MIZ – Chase Coffman 1-yard pass from Chase Daniel (Jeff Wolfert kick), 5:24. Tigers 7–6. Drive: 9 plays, 80 yards, 3:14.

Second quarter

- MIZ – Cornelius Brown 100-yard fumble return (run failed), 4:55. Tigers 13–6.
- MIZ – William Franklin 2-yard pass from Chase Daniel (Jeff Wolfert kick), 0:20. Tigers 20–6. Drive: 12 plays, 69 yards, 2:50.
- MIZ – Jeff Wolfert 27-yard field goal, 0:00. Tigers 23–6. Drive: 2 plays, 5 yards, 0:13.

Third quarter

- ILL – Rashard Mendenhall 25-yard run (Jason Reda kick), 12:31. Tigers 23–13. Drive: 9 plays, 79 yards, 2:29.
- MIZ – Jeremy Maclin 25-yard pass from Chase Daniel (Jeff Wolfert kick), 10:03. Tigers 30–13. Drive: 7 plays, 80 yards, 2:28.
- MIZ – Jeremy Maclin 66-yard punt return (Jeff Wolfert kick), 6:11. Tigers 37–13.
- ILL – Eddie McGee 16-yard run (Jason Reda kick), 4:08. Tigers 37–20. Drive: 7 plays, 72 yards, 2:03.
- ILL – Kyle Hudson 41-yard pass from Eddie McGee (Jason Reda kick), 2:47. Tigers 37–27. Drive: 1 play, 41 yards, 0:07.

Fourth quarter

- ILL – Rashard Mendenhall 4-yard run (Jason Reda kick), 13:48. Tigers 37–34. Drive: 2 plays, 4 yards, 0:10.
- MIZ – Jeff Wolfert 32-yard field goal, 8:32. Tigers 40–34. Drive: 9 plays, 46 yards, 1:49.

Statistics	MIZ	ILL
First downs	25	23
Total yards	429	435
Rushing yards	70	119
Passing yards	359	316
Turnovers	3	5
Time of possession	29:23	30:37

Team	Category	Player	Statistics
Missouri	Passing	Chase Daniel	37/54, 359 yards, 3 TD
Missouri	Rushing	Tony Temple	17 rushes, 33 yards
Missouri	Receiving	Martin Rucker	10 receptions, 86 yards
Illinois	Passing	Eddie McGee	17/31, 257 yards, TD, 2 INT
Illinois	Rushing	Daniel Dufrene	6 rushes, 58 yards
Illinois	Receiving	Arrelious Benn	5 receptions, 74 yards

=== At Ole Miss ===
Missouri Tigers at Ole Miss Rebels – Game summary

Quarter	1	2	3	4	Total
Tigers	0	28	10	0	38
Rebels	0	7	12	6	25

at Vaught–Hemingway Stadium, Oxford, Mississippi

- Date: September 8
- Game time: 5:00 p.m. CDT
- Game weather: Cloudy, 90 °F (32 °C)
- Game attendance: 50,897
- Referee: Randy Christal
- Box score, Recap

Game information
First quarter
- No scoring plays

Second quarter

- MIZ – William Franklin 10-yard pass from Chase Daniel (Jeff Wolfert kick), 14:55. Tigers 7–0. Drive: 10 plays, 55 yards, 3:01.
- MIZ – William Franklin 40-yard pass from Chase Daniel (Jeff Wolfert kick), 9:52. Tigers 14–0. Drive: 7 plays, 73 yards, 2:38.
- MIZ – Martin Rucker 40-yard pass from Chase Daniel (Jeff Wolfert kick), 4:24. Tigers 21–0. Drive: 6 plays, 93 yards, 1:54.
- MISS – Shay Hodge 5-yard pass from Seth Adams (Joshua Shene kick), 1:09. Tigers 21–7. Drive: 9 plays, 71 yards, 3:07.
- MIZ – Chase Coffman 7-yard pass from Chase Daniel (Jeff Wolfert kick), 0:04. Tigers 28–7. Drive: 8 plays, 54 yards, 0:57.

Third quarter

- MIZ – Greg Bracey 37-yard pass from Chase Daniel (Jeff Wolfert kick), 13:48. Tigers 35–7. Drive: 3 plays, 70 yards, 1:05.
- MISS – Mike Wallace 68-yard pass from Seth Adams (pass failed), 12:53. Tigers 35–13. Drive: 2 plays, 75 yards, 0:47.
- MIZ – Jeff Wolfert 27-yard field goal, 9:40. Tigers 38–13. Drive: 11 plays, 58 yards, 3:05.
- MISS – Greg Hardy 3-yard pass from Seth Adams (pass failed), 4:24. Tigers 38–19. Drive: 13 plays, 71 yards, 5:10.

Fourth quarter

- MISS – B. J. Green-Ellis 2-yard run (pass failed), 14:56. Tigers 38–25. Drive: 6 plays, 75 yards, 1:51.

Statistics	MIZ	MISS
First downs	29	26
Total yards	548	534
Rushing yards	218	229
Passing yards	330	305
Turnovers	0	2
Time of possession	28:27	31:09

Team	Category	Player	Statistics
Missouri	Passing	Chase Daniel	31/42, 330 yards, 5 TD
Missouri	Rushing	Tony Temple	17 rushes, 123 yards
Missouri	Receiving	William Franklin	8 receptions, 105 yards, 2 TD
Ole Miss	Passing	Seth Adams	23/41, 305 yards, 3 TD, INT
Ole Miss	Rushing	B. J. Green-Ellis	33 rushes, 226 yards, TD
Ole Miss	Receiving	Mike Wallace	7 receptions, 136 yards, TD

=== Western Michigan ===
Western Michigan Broncos at Missouri Tigers – Game summary

Quarter	1	2	3	4	Total
Broncos	0	3	7	14	24
Tigers	14	17	7	14	52

at Faurot Field, Columbia, Missouri

- Date: September 15
- Game time: 1:00 p.m. CDT
- Game weather: Partly sunny, 58 °F (14 °C)
- Game attendance: 53,480
- Referee: Ross Smith
- Box score, Recap

Statistics	WMU	MIZ
First downs		
Total yards		
Rushing yards		
Passing yards		
Turnovers		
Time of possession		

Team	Category	Player	Statistics
Western Michigan	Passing		
Western Michigan	Rushing		
Western Michigan	Receiving		
Missouri	Passing		
Missouri	Rushing		
Missouri	Receiving		

=== No. 14 (FCS) Illinois State ===
No. 14 (FCS) Illinois State Redbirds at No. 25 Missouri Tigers – Game summary

Quarter	1	2	3	4	Total
No. 14 (FCS) Redbirds	3	7	0	7	17
No. 25 Tigers	14	10	7	7	38

at Faurot Field, Columbia, Missouri

- Date: September 22
- Game time: 1:00 p.m. CDT
- Game weather: Sunny, 81 °F (27 °C)
- Game attendance: 56,137
- Referee: Clete Blakeman
- Box score, Recap

Statistics	ILST	MIZ
First downs		
Total yards		
Rushing yards		
Passing yards		
Turnovers		
Time of possession		

Team	Category	Player	Statistics
Illinois State	Passing		
Illinois State	Rushing		
Illinois State	Receiving		
Missouri	Passing		
Missouri	Rushing		
Missouri	Receiving		

=== No. 25 Nebraska ===
No. 25 Nebraska Cornhuskers at No. 17 Missouri Tigers – Game summary

Quarter	1	2	3	4	Total
No. 25 Cornhuskers	3	3	0	0	6
No. 17 Tigers	14	6	14	7	41

at Faurot Field, Columbia, Missouri

- Date: October 6
- Game time: 8:15 p.m. CDT
- Game weather: Clear, 79 °F (26 °C)
- Game attendance: 70,049
- Referee: Jon Bible
- TV announcers (ESPN): Ron Franklin, Ed Cunningham, and Jack Arute
- Box score, Recap

Statistics	NEB	MIZ
First downs	20	32
Total yards	297	606
Rushing yards	74	195
Passing yards	235	411
Turnovers	1	0
Time of possession		

Team	Category	Player	Statistics
Nebraska	Passing		
Nebraska	Rushing		
Nebraska	Receiving		
Missouri	Passing	Chase Daniel	33-47, 401 yards, 2 TD
Missouri	Rushing	Chase Daniel	11 carries, 72 yards, 2 TD
Missouri	Receiving	Martin Rucker	9 receptions, 109 yards, 1 TD

=== At No. 6 Oklahoma ===
No. 11 Missouri Tigers at No. 6 Oklahoma Sooners – Game summary

Quarter	1	2	3	4	Total
No. 11 Tigers	7	3	14	7	31
No. 6 Sooners	10	7	6	18	41

at Gaylord Family Oklahoma Memorial Stadium, Norman, Oklahoma

- Date: October 13
- Game time: 5:30 p.m. CDT
- Game weather: Clear, 82 °F (28 °C)
- Game attendance: 85,041
- Referee: Gerald Wright
- TV announcers (FSN): Joel Meyers, Gary Reasons, and Emily Jones
- Box score, Recap

Statistics	MIZ	OKLA
First downs		
Total yards		
Rushing yards		
Passing yards		
Turnovers		
Time of possession		

Team	Category	Player	Statistics
Missouri	Passing		
Missouri	Rushing		
Missouri	Receiving		
Oklahoma	Passing		
Oklahoma	Rushing		
Oklahoma	Receiving		

=== No. 22 Texas Tech ===
No. 22 Texas Tech Red Raiders at No. 15 Missouri Tigers – Game summary

Quarter	1	2	3	4	Total
No. 22 Red Raiders	0	10	0	0	10
No. 15 Tigers	10	7	7	17	41

at Faurot Field, Columbia, Missouri

- Date: October 6
- Game time: 2:30 p.m. CDT
- Game weather: Clear, 80 °F (27 °C)
- Game attendance: 63,396
- Referee: Randy Christal
- TV announcers (ABC): Ron Franklin, Ed Cunningham, Jack Arute
- Box score, Recap

Game information
First quarter
- MIZ – Stryker Sulak 38-yard interception return (Jeff Wolfert kick), 10:21. Tigers 7–0.
- MIZ – Jeff Wolfert 21-yard field goal, 2:13. Tigers 10–0. Drive: 12 plays, 58 yards, 4:48.

Second quarter

- TTU – Edward Britton 68-yard pass from Graham Harrel (Alex Trlica kick), 6:39. Tigers 10–7. Drive: 3 plays, 80 yards, 0:40.
- MIZ – Jimmy Jackson 1-yard run (Jeff Wolfert kick), 5:05. Tigers 17–7. Drive: 5 plays, 66 yards, 1:27.
- TTU – Alex Trlica 45-yard field goal, 0:22. Tigers 17–10. Drive: 5 plays, 15 yards, 0:27.

Third quarter

- MIZ – Jimmy Jackson 3-yard run (Jeff Wolfert kick), 7:34. Tigers 24–10. Drive: 8 plays, 60 yards, 3:10.

Fourth quarter

- MIZ – Jimmy Jackson 1-yard run (Jeff Wolfert kick), 14:04. Tigers 31–10. Drive: 13 plays, 76 yards, 4:58.
- MIZ – Jeremy Maclin 57-yard pass from Chase Daniel (Jeff Wolfert kick), 9:36. Tigers 38–10. Drive: 2 plays, 63 yards, 0:52.
- MIZ – Jeff Wolfert 39-yard field goal, 4:40. Tigers 41–10. Drive: 7 plays, 33 yards, 3:01.

Statistics	TTU	MIZ
First downs	23	23
Total yards	388	422
Rushing yards	-9	212
Passing yards	397	210
Turnovers	4	2
Time of possession	31:44	28:16

Team	Category	Player	Statistics
Texas Tech	Passing	Graham Harrell	44/69, 397 yards, TD, 4 INT
Texas Tech	Rushing	Shannon Woods	10 rushes, 30 yards
Texas Tech	Receiving	Danny Amendola	11 receptions, 94 yards
Missouri	Passing	Chase Daniel	14/19, 210 yards, TD, INT
Missouri	Rushing	Derrick Washington	9 rushes, 66 yards
Missouri	Receiving	Chase Coffman	3 receptions, 53 yards

=== Iowa State ===
Iowa State Cyclones at No. 13 Missouri Tigers – Game summary

Quarter	1	2	3	4	Total
Cyclones	0	14	7	7	28
No. 13 Tigers	14	6	15	7	42

at Faurot Field, Columbia, Missouri

- Date: October 27
- Game time: 1:00 p.m. CDT
- Game attendance: 53,386

Statistics	ISU	MIZ
First downs		
Total yards		
Rushing yards		
Passing yards		
Turnovers		
Time of possession		

Team	Category	Player	Statistics
Iowa State	Passing		
Iowa State	Rushing		
Iowa State	Receiving		
Missouri	Passing		
Missouri	Rushing		
Missouri	Receiving		

=== At Colorado ===
No. 9 Missouri Tigers at Colorado Buffaloes – Game summary

Quarter	1	2	3	4	Total
No. 9 Tigers	7	24	17	7	55
Buffaloes	10	0	0	0	10

at Folsom Field, Boulder, Colorado

- Date: November 3
- Game time: 5:30 p.m. CDT/4:30 p.m. MDT
- Game attendance: 51,483
- TV announcers (FSN): Joel Meyers, Dave Lapham, Jim Knox

Statistics	MIZ	COL
First downs	25	7
Total yards	598	196
Rushing yards	169	84
Passing yards	449	123
Turnovers	1	4
Time of possession		

Team	Category	Player	Statistics
Missouri	Passing	Chase Daniel	26/44, 421 yards, 5 TD, 1 INT
Missouri	Rushing	Derrick Washington	8 carries, 48 yards, 1 TD
Missouri	Receiving	Will Franklin	2 receptions, 109 yards
Colorado	Passing		
Colorado	Rushing		
Colorado	Receiving		

=== Texas A&M ===
Texas A&M Aggies at No. 7 Missouri Tigers – Game summary

Quarter	1	2	3	4	Total
Aggies	2	7	10	7	26
No. 7 Tigers	7	17	0	16	40

at Faurot Field, Columbia, Missouri

- Date: November 10
- Game time: 11:30 a.m. CST
- Game attendance: 64,945
- TV announcers (FSN): Joel Meyers, Dave Lapham, Jim Knox, Dan McLaughlin

Statistics	TAMU	MIZ
First downs		
Total yards		
Rushing yards		
Passing yards		
Turnovers		
Time of possession		

Team	Category	Player	Statistics
Texas A&M	Passing		
Texas A&M	Rushing		
Texas A&M	Receiving		
Missouri	Passing		
Missouri	Rushing		
Missouri	Receiving		

=== At Kansas State ===
No. 6 Missouri Tigers at Kansas State Wildcats – Game summary

Quarter	1	2	3	4	Total
No. 6 Tigers	14	7	14	14	49
Wildcats	9	9	7	7	32

at Bill Snyder Family Football Stadium, Manhattan, Kansas

- Date: November 17
- Game time: 11:30 a.m. CST
- Game attendance: 48,406
- TV announcers (FSN): Bill Land, Gary Reasons, Emily Jones

Statistics	MIZ	KSU
First downs		
Total yards		
Rushing yards		
Passing yards		
Turnovers		
Time of possession		

Team	Category	Player	Statistics
Missouri	Passing		
Missouri	Rushing		
Missouri	Receiving		
Kansas State	Passing		
Kansas State	Rushing		
Kansas State	Receiving		

=== Vs. No. 2 Kansas ===
No. 3 Missouri Tigers vs. No. 2 Kansas Jayhawks – Game summary

Quarter	1	2	3	4	Total
No. 3 Tigers	7	7	14	8	36
No. 2 Jayhawks	0	0	7	21	28

at Arrowhead Stadium, Kansas City, Missouri

- Date: November 24
- Game time: 7:00 p.m. CST
- Game weather: Fair skies, 33 °F (1 °C)
- Game attendance: 80,537
- Referee: Jon Bible
- TV announcers (ABC): Brent Musburger, Kirk Herbstreit, and Lisa Salters

Game information
First quarter
- MIZ – Martin Rucker 1-yard pass from Chase Daniel (Jeff Wolfert kick), 0:29. Tigers 7–0. Drive: 11 plays, 78 yards, 3:59.

Second quarter

- MIZ – Danario Alexander 11-yard pass from Chase Daniel (Jeff Wolfert kick), 9:21. Tigers 14–0. Drive: 13 plays, 98 yards, 5:14.

Third quarter

- MIZ – Jimmy Jackson 1-yard run (Jeff Wolfert kick), 10:36. Tigers 21–0. Drive: 7 plays, 40 yards, 2:01.
- KU – Brandon McAnderson 1-yard run (Scott Webb kick), 7:21. Tigers 21–7. Drive: 8 plays, 67 yards, 3:15.
- MIZ – Derrick Washington 3-yard pass from Chase Daniel (Jeff Wolfert kick), 1:19. Tigers 28–7. Drive: 14 plays, 69 yards, 6:02.

Fourth quarter

- KU – Todd Reesing 5-yard run (Scott Webb kick), 13:02. Tigers 28–14. Drive: 11 plays, 65 yards, 3:17.
- MIZ – Jeff Wolfert 43-yard field goal, 9:55. Tigers 31–14. Drive: 10 plays, 44 yards, 3:07.
- KU – Dexton Fields 10-yard pass from Todd Reesing (Scott Webb kick), 8:28. Tigers 31–21. Drive: 7 plays, 57 yards, 1:27.
- MIZ – Jeff Wolfert 43-yard field goal, 3:31. Tigers 34–21. Drive: 11 plays, 49 yards, 4:57.
- KU – Marcus Henry 5-yard pass from Todd Reesing (Scott Webb kick), 2:03. Tigers 34–28. Drive: 11 plays, 63 yards, 1:28.
- MIZ – Todd Reesing sacked in own end zone by Lorenzo Williams, 0:12. Tigers 36–28.

Statistics	MIZ	KU
First downs	29	23
Total yards	519	391
Rushing yards	151	42
Passing yards	368	349
Passing: comp–att–int	41–50–0	28–49–2
Turnovers	0	2

Team	Category	Player	Statistics
Missouri	Passing	Chase Daniel	40/49 361 yards, 3 TD
Missouri	Rushing	Tony Temple	22 carries, 98 yards
Missouri	Receiving	Danario Alexander	8 receptions, 117 yards, TD
Kansas	Passing	Todd Reesing	28/49 349 yards, 2 TD, 2 INT
Kansas	Rushing	Brandon McAnderson	14 carries, 41 yards, TD
Kansas	Receiving	Dexton Fields	8 receptions, 116 yards, TD

=== Vs. No. 9 Oklahoma (Big 12 Championship Game) ===
No. 9 Oklahoma Sooners vs. No. 1 Missouri Tigers (2007 Big 12 Championship Game) – Game summary

Quarter	1	2	3	4	Total
No. 9 Sooners	0	14	14	10	38
No. 1 Tigers	3	11	0	2	16

at Alamodome, San Antonio, Texas

- Date: December 1
- Game time: 7:00 p.m. CST
- Game weather: None (played indoors)
- Game attendance: 62,585
- Referee: Clete Blakeman
- TV announcers (ABC): Brent Musburger, Kirk Herbstreit, Lisa Salters

Statistics	OKLA	MIZ
First downs		
Total yards		
Rushing yards		
Passing yards		
Turnovers		
Time of possession		

Team	Category	Player	Statistics
Oklahoma	Passing		
Oklahoma	Rushing		
Oklahoma	Receiving		
Missouri	Passing		
Missouri	Rushing		
Missouri	Receiving		

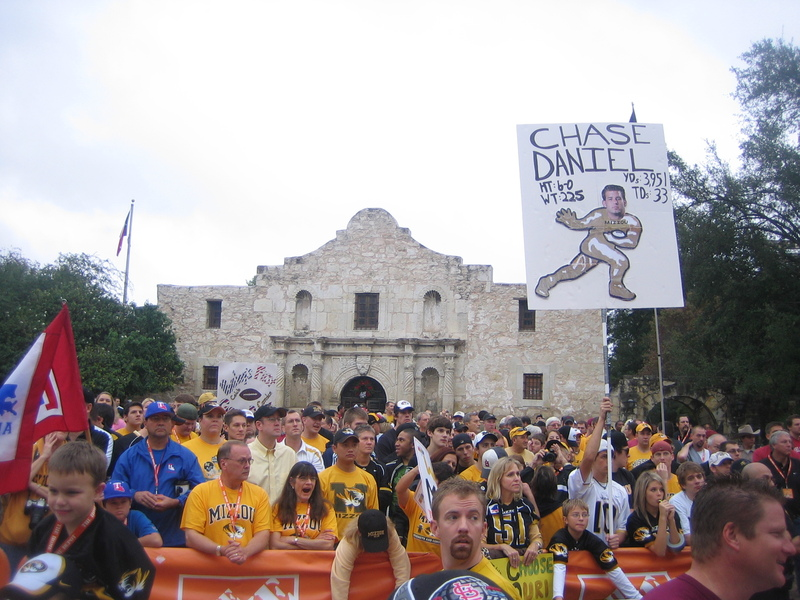
Missouri fans in front of the Alamo before the game.

=== Vs. Arkansas (Cotton Bowl Classic) ===
No. 7 Missouri Tigers vs. No. 25 Arkansas Razorbacks (2008 Cotton Bowl Classic) – Game summary

Quarter	1	2	3	4	Total
No. 7 Tigers	7	7	14	10	38
No. 25 Razorbacks	0	0	7	0	7

at Cotton Bowl, Dallas, Texas

- Date: January 1, 2008
- Game time: 10:40 a.m. CST
- Game attendance: 73,114
- Referee: Ron Cherry
- TV announcers (Fox): Pat Summerall, Brian Baldinger, and Krista Voda

Statistics	MIZ	ARK
First downs		
Total yards		
Rushing yards		
Passing yards		
Turnovers		
Time of possession		

Team	Category	Player	Statistics
Missouri	Passing		
Missouri	Rushing		
Missouri	Receiving		
Arkansas	Passing		
Arkansas	Rushing		
Arkansas	Receiving		

== Roster ==
2007 Missouri Tigers football roster (as of August 31, 2007)
Wide receivers: 2 William Franklin Senior; 4 Jason Ray – (redshirt) Senior; 6 Sanford Gooden - (redshirt) Freshman; 8 Jared Perry – Sophomore; 9 Jeremy Maclin – (redshirt) Freshman; 28 Adam Casey – (redshirt) Junior; 30 Drew Yanker – Freshman; 31 Michael Oldroyd – (redshirt) Freshman; 36 Tyrone Reece – Sophomore; 81 Danario Alexander – Sophomore; 84 Tommy Saunders – (redshirt) Junior; 85 Greg Bracey – (redshirt) Senior; 86 Chris Gares – (redshirt) Sophomore; 87 Lucas Null – Senior; 88 Forrest Shock – (redshirt) Freshman; 89 Blake May – (redshirt) Sophomore; Offensive line: 51 James Stigall – (redshirt) Sophomore; 54 Chris Tipton – Senior; 55 Jayson Palmgren – Freshman; 57 Tony Ploudre – Freshman; 58 Brendan Donaldson – Freshman; 60 Bryan Webb – Freshman; 61 Colin Brown – (redshirt) Junior; 62 Tim Barnes – (redshirt) Freshman; 63 Ryan Schleusner – (redshirt) Freshman; 65 Mike Prince – (redshirt) Freshman; 66 Austin Wuebbels – Freshman; 67 J. T. Beasley – Freshman; 68 Dain Wise – (redshirt) Sophomore; 69 Jesse Hernandez "Redshirt Freshman; 71 Monte Wyrick – (redshirt) Senior; 72 Elvis Fisher – Freshman; 73 Thomas Hellm – Freshman; 76 Ryan Madison – (redshirt) Junior; 77 Adam Spieker – (redshirt) Senior; 78 Kurtis Gregory – (redshirt) Sophomore; 79 Tyler Luellen – (redshirt) Senior; Tight ends: 33 Levi Hamilton – Junior; 43 Jon Gissinger – (redshirt) Sophomore; 45 Chase Coffman – Junior; 48 Caleb Medley – Freshman; 49 Joshua Biship – Sophomore; 82 Martin Rucker – (redshirt) Senior; 93 Andy Loyd – (redshirt) Freshman	Quarterbacks: 5 Dominic Grooms – (redshirt) Freshman; 10 Chase Daniel – Junior; 11 Jimmy Costello – Freshman; 13 J. P. Tillman – (redshirt) Freshman; 14 Chase Patton – (redshirt) Junior; Running backs: 1 Jimmy Jackson – (redshirt) Junior; 3 Marcus Woods – (redshirt) Senior; 7 Earl Goldsmith – (redshirt) Junior; 22 Tony Temple – Senior; 24 Derrick Washington – Freshman; 26 De'Vion Moore – Freshman; 46 Shawn Scott – Sophomore; Defensive line: 38 Stryker Sulak – (redshirt) Junior; 39 Tyler Crane – Freshman; 47 Jaysen Corbett – Junior; 48 Tommy Chavis – Junior; 50 Jason Townson – Junior; 53 Terrell Resonno – Freshman; 59 Zach Milligan – (redshirt) Freshman; 75 Brandon Shipman – Sophomore; 90 Dominique Hamilton – Freshman; 91 Charles Gaines – Senior; 92 Andy Maples – Junior; 93 John Stull – (redshirt) Freshman; 94 Evander Hood – Junior; 95 Chris Earnhardt – Freshman; 95 Steven Blair – (redshirt) Senior; 96 Jaron Baston – (redshirt) Sophomore; 98 Bart Coslet – (redshirt) Freshman; 99 Lorenzo Williams – (redshirt) Senior; Linebackers: 2 Connell Davis – (redshirt) Sophomore; 5 Van Alexander – (redshirt) Junior; 12 Sean Weatherspoon – Sophomore; 18 Steve Redmond – (redshirt) Junior; 25 Aaron O'Neal – (redshirt) Junior †; 30 Marquis Booker – (redshirt) Freshman; 33 Luke Lambert – Freshman; 34 Brock Christopher – Junior; 40 Andrew Gachkar – Freshman; 41 John Ruth – Senior; 45 Marlon Galbreath – (redshirt) Freshman; 49 Michael Keck – Freshman; 53 Jeff Gettys – (redshirt) Freshman; 64 Joe Schumacher – (redshirt) Sophomore; 74 Stephon Hayden – Sophomore	Safety: 14 Scipio Daniels – Freshman; 16 Devin Lenauer – Freshman; Strong Safety: 1 William Moore (redshirt) Junior; 8 Justin Garrett – Junior; 10 Gilbert Moye – Freshman; 13 Cornelius Brown – Senior; 24 Mack Breed – (redshirt) Junior; Free Safety: 4 Travis Cardoza – (redshirt) Senior; 15 Del Howard – Sophomore; Defensive backs: 3 Darnell Terrell – Senior; 4 James Aldridge – Freshman; 6 Paul Simpson – Senior; 7 La'Roderick Thomas – (redshirt) Freshman; 11 Tremane Vaughns – Junior; 19 Carl Gettis – Freshman; 20 Kevin Rutland – (redshirt) Freshman; 20 Erik Ruin – (redshirt) Sophomore; 21 Castine Bridges – (redshirt) Junior; 28 Hardy Ricks – (redshirt) Sophomore; 31 Trey Hobson – Freshman; 33 John Gill – (redshirt) Sophomore; 35 Matt Davis – (redshirt) Freshman; 41 Ryan Sutherlin – Freshman; 43 Tony Buhr – (redshirt) Junior; 26 Terris Phillips – (redshirt) Sophomore; Punters: 36 Jake Harry – Junior; 90 Adam Crossett – (redshirt) Senior; Kickers: 99 Jeff Wolfert – (redshirt) Junior
† Starter at position † LB Aaron O'Neal died on July 13, 2005, but remained on the Tigers' roster for the remainder of his eligibility

== Coaching staff ==
Name	Position	Years at MU	Alma mater (Year)
Gary Pinkel	Head coach	7	Kent State (1975)
Dave Christensen (assistant head coach)	Offensive coordinator Quarterbacks, Offensive Line	7	Western Washington (1985)
Matt Eberflus (associate head coach)	Defensive coordinator Safeties	7	Toledo (1993)
Cornell Ford	Cornerbacks	7	Toledo (1991)
Andy Hill	Wide receivers	12	University of Missouri (1985)
Brian Jones	Running backs	7	Connecticut (1981)
Craig Kuligowski	Defensive line	7	Toledo (1991)
Dave Steckel	Linebackers	7	Kutztown (1982)
Bruce Walker	Tight ends Assistant offensive line	7	Central Washington (1983)
David Yost	Quarterbacks; Recruiting coordinator	7	Kent State (1992)
Barry Odom	Assistant ad for football operations	5	University of Missouri (1999)
Nick Otterbacher	Director of football recruiting	4	Toledo (2002)

Coaching staff from: "Missouri Tigers – 2007 Roster". CSTV.com. Archived from the original on January 1, 2008.

== Rankings ==
Ranking movements Legend: ██ Increase in ranking ██ Decrease in ranking RV = Received votes ( ) = First-place votes
	Week															
Poll	Pre	1	2	3	4	5	6	7	8	9	10	11	12	13	14	Final
AP	RV	RV	RV	25	20	17	11	16	13	9	7	6	3 (1)	1 (45)	7	4
Coaches	RV	RV	RV	25	20	17	11	17	13	9	7	6	4	2 (17)	7	5
Harris	Not released				21	18	11	17	13	9	7	6	3	1 (57)	7	Not released
BCS	Not released							16	13	9	6	5	4	1	6	Not released

== Statistics ==
(through Cotton Bowl Classic, Jan. 1, 2008)

	MU	Opp
Scoring	558	326
Points per Game	39.9	23.3
FIRST DOWNS	378	286
Rushing	140	90
Passing	215	178
Penalty	23	18
RUSHING YARDAGE	2,467	1,709
Gained	2,892	2,106
Lost	-425	-397
Rushing Attempts	530	476
Average per Rush	4.7	3.6
Average per Game	176.2	122.1
TDs Rushing	29	20
PASSING YARDAGE	4,397	3,596
Comp-Att-Int	394-582–13	347–560–17
Average per Pass	7.6	6.4
Average per Catch	11.2	10.4
Average per Game	314.1	256.9
TDs Passing	34	18
TOTAL OFFENSE	6,864	5,305
Total Plays	1,112	1,036
Avg per Play	6.2	5.1
Avg per Game	490.3	378.9
Kick returns-Yards	49–1,143	91–1,908
Punt returns-Yards	26–307	18–126
Int. Returns-Yards	17–171	13–202

	MU	Opp
Kick return Avg	23.3	21.0
Punt return Avg	11.8	7.0
Int. Return Avg	10.1	15.5
Fumbles-Lost	18–7	28–16
Penalties-Yards	76–648	103–778
Avg per Game	46.3	55.6
Punts-Yards	56–2,008	70–2,804
Avg per Punt	35.9	40.1
Net punt avg	31.5	34.0
Time of possession/Game	28:50	31:08
3rd down conversions	107/202 (53%)	95/226 (42%)
4th down conversions	6/10 (60%)	16/28 (57%)
Sacks-Yards	30–258	21–169
Touchdowns scored	70	43
Field goals-Attempts	21–25 (84%)	11–17 (65%)
On-Side Kicks	0–1	0–3
Red-Zone Scores	61–67 (91%)	39–53 (74%)
Red-Zone TDs	45–67 (67%)	29–53 (55%)
PAT-Attempts	67–67 (100%)	33–39 (85%)
ATTENDANCE	361,393	235,827
Games / Avg per Game	6 / 60,232	4 / 58,957
Neutral Site		4 / 69,647

=== Scores by Quarter ===
	1	2	3	4	Total
Opponents	43	81	98	104	326
Tigers	125	166	147	120	558

=== Offense ===
PASSING
Name	GP	Effic	Cmp-Att-Int	Pct	Yds	TD	Lng	Avg/G
Daniel, Chase	14	147.89	384–563-11	68.2	4,306	33	82	307.6
Patton, Chase	10	69.54	6–13–1	46.2	60	0	22	6.7
Saunders, Tommy	14	296.80	3–3–0	100.0	31	1	14	2.4
Maclin, Jeremy	14	−50.00	1–2–1	50.0	0	0	0	0.0
Total	14	145.97	394–582–13	67.7	4,397	34	82	314.1
Opponents	14	120.44	347–560–17	62.0	3,596	18	68	256.9

RECEIVING (sortable options)
Name	GP	No.	Yds	Avg	TD	Long	Avg/G
Rucker, Martin	14	84	834	9.9	8	40	59.6
Maclin, Jeremy	14	80	1,055	13.2	9	82	75.4
Coffman, Chase	13	52	531	10.2	7	33	40.8
Franklin, Will	14	49	709	14.5	4	72	50.6
Saunders, Tommy	14	41	397	9.7	1	28	28.4
Alexander, Danario	10	37	417	11.3	2	48	41.7
Perry, Jered	14	13	152	11.7	0	45	10.9
Washington, Derrick	12	10	70	7.0	1	25	5.7
Ray, Jason	13	8	61	7.6	0	13	4.7
Temple, Tony	12	7	68	9.7	1	20	5.7
Jackson, Jimmy	14	6	30	5.0	0	10	2.1
Goldsmith, Earl	12	4	20	5.0	0	8	1.7
Bracey, Greg	11	3	53	17.7	1	37	4.8
Total	14	394	4,397	11.2	34	82	314.1
Opponents	14	347	3,596	10.4	18	68	256.9

RUSHING (sortable options)
Name	GP	Att	Gain	Loss	Net	Avg	TD	Long	Avg/G
Temple, Tony	12	186	1135	96	1039	5.6	12	44	86.6
Maclin, Jeremy	14	51	388	13	375	7.4	4	30	26.8
Jackson, Jimmy	14	67	342	11	331	4.9	7	18	23.6
Daniel, Chase	14	109	471	218	253	2.3	4	39	18.1
Washington, Derrick	12	36	199	15	184	5.1	1	20	15.3
Woods, Marcus	6	21	120	0	120	5.7	0	19	20.0
Goldsmith, Earl	12	19	99	7	92	4.8	0	19	7.7
Rucker, Martin	14	14	51	1	50	3.6	0	9	3.6
Patton, Chase	10	5	35	1	34	6.8	1	18	3.4
Alexander, Danario	10	6	36	5	31	5.2	0	19	3.1
Coffman, Chase	13	1	8	0	8	8.0	0	8	0.6
Saunders, Tommy	14	2	8	11	−3	−1.5	0	8	−0.2
Perry, Jered	14	1	0	5	−5	−5.0	0	0	−0.4
Team	10	12	0	42	−42	−3.5	0	0	−4.2
Total	14	530	2,892	425	2,467	4.7	29	44	176.2
Opponents	14	476	2,106	397	1,709	3.6	20	66	122.1

=== Field Goals / PAT ===
Name	FG-FGA	Pct	01-19	20–29	30–39	40–49	50–99	Lng	Blkd	PAT	Pts.
Wolfert, Jeff	21–25	84.0	2–2	8–8	7–8	4–7	0–0	48	0	67–67	130

=== Special teams ===
Name	Punting								Kickoffs				
Name	No.	Yds	Avg	Long	TB	FC	In20	Blkd	No.	Yds	Avg	TB	OB
Crossett, Adam	46	1,788	38.9	63	6	15	17	2	13	831	63.9	2	1
Team	4	0	0.0	0	0	0	0	1					
Wolfert, Jeff									81	4,758	58.7	3	3
Total	50	1,788	35.8	63	6	15	17	3	94	5,589	59.5	5	4
Opponents	65	2,610	40.2	66	6	17	17	0	66	4,142	62.8	15	1

Name	Punt returns					Kick returns				
Name	No.	Yds	Avg	TD	Long	No.	Yds	Avg	TD	Long
Maclin, Jeremy	23	302	13.1	2	66	43	1,039	24.2	1	99
Franklin, William	1	0	0.0	0	0					
Vaughns, Tremane						3	80	26.7	0	30
Jackson, Jimmy						1	11	11.0	0	11
Goldsmith, Earl						1	7	7.0	0	7
Bridges, Castine						0	4	0.0	0	4
Woods, Marcus						1	2	2.0	0	2
Total	24	302	12.6	2	66	49	1,143	23.3	1	99
Opponents	15	124	8.3	2	27	84	1,740	20.7	0	41

=== Defense ===
Name	GP	Tackles				Sacks	Pass defense		Interceptions				Fumbles		Blkd Kick
Name	GP	Solo	Ast	Total	TFL-Yds	No-Yds	BrUp	QBH	No.-Yds	Avg	TD	Long	Rcv-Yds	FF	Blkd Kick
Moore, William	13	63	41	104	9.0–42	2.0–21	5	2	7–35	5.0	0	22	0–0	1	0
Brown, Cornelius	8	41	29	70	8.0–18	0.0–0	4	0	3–23	7.7	0	8	2-102	1	1
Witherspoon, Sean	13	73	51	124	8.5–36	2.0–17	7	0	0–0	0.0	0	0	1–0	2	0
Christopher, Brock	13	52	44	96	6.5–16	1.5–9	4	1	1–0	0.0	0	0	0–0	1	0
Williams, Lorenzo	13	19	12	31	9.5–63	6.0–58	1	0	0–0	0	0	0	2–0	0	0
Hood, Ziggy	13	25	18	43	6.5–27	3.5–20	5	4	0–0	0	0	0	1–0	3	0
Sulak, Stryker	13	32	22	54	9.0–69	6.0-62	5	3	1–38	38.0	1	38	0–0	4	1
Chavis, Tommy	13	25	17	42	7.0–28	4.5–25	1	3	0–0	0.0	0	0	0–0	2	1
Bridges, Castine	13	34	15	49	0.0–0	0.0–0	1	0	1–49	49.0	0	49	1–0	0	0
Garrett, Justin	12	20	22	42	0.0–0	0.0–0	3	0	2–0	0.0	0	0	0–0	2	0
Gettis, Carl	13	35	10	45	2.0–5	0.0–0	1	0	1–0	0.0	0	0	0–0	0	0
Terrell, Darnell	13	31	9	40	0.5–5	0.0–0	10	1	0–0	0.0	0	0	2–0	0	0
Alexander, Van	13	26	31	57	1.0–7	1.0–7	1	1	0–0	0.0	0	0	1–0	1	0
Howard, Del	12	19	12	31	1.0–2	0.0–0	1	0	0–0	0.0	0	0	0–0	0	0
Lambert, Luke	13	13	9	22	1.0–10	1.0–10	0	0	0–0	0.0	0	0	0–0	0	0
Ricks, Hardy	13	15	6	21	2.0–14	0.0–0	1	0	0–0	0.0	0	0	0–0	0	0
Simpson, Paul	13	10	6	16	0.0–0	0.0–0	2	0	0–0	0.0	0	0	0–0	0	0
Gachkar, Andrew	13	9	7	16	0.0–0	0.0–0	0	0	0–0	0.0	0	0	0–0	1	0
Davis, Connell	11	6	7	13	0.0–0	0.0–0	0	0	0–0	0.0	0	0	2–3	0	0
Gaines, Charles	13	9	6	15	2.0–10	0.0–0	0	0	0–0	0.0	0	0	0–0	0	0
Vaughns, Tremane	13	10	2	12	0.0–0	0.0–0	0	0	0–0	0.0	0	0	0–0	0	0
Redmond, Steve	13	4	5	9	0.0–0	0.0–0	0	0	0–0	0.0	0	0	0–0	0	0
Washington, Derrick	11	4	5	9	0.0–0	0.0–0	0	0	0–0	0.0	0	0	0–0	0	0
Baston, Jaron	13	4	8	12	1.5–5	0.0–0	0	1	0–0	0.0	0	0	0–0	0	0
Stull, John	11	5	4	9	0.5–1	0.0–0	0	0	0–0	0.0	0	0	0–0	0	0
Corbett, Jaysen	10	3	4	7	1.0–6	1.0–6	0	0	0–0	0.0	0	0	0–0	0	0
Prince, Mike	1	1	0	1	1.0–18	0.0–0	0	0	0–0	0.0	0	0	0–0	1	0
Coslet, Bart	2	0	0	0	0.0–0	0.0–0	0	1	0–0	0.0	0	0	0–0	0	0
Team	2	0	0	0	0.0–0	0.0–0	0	0	0–0	0.0	0	0	0–0	0	1
Total	13	607	409	1,016	77–382	27–232	52	17	16–145	9.1	1	49	12–105	19	4
Opponents	13	580	524	1,104	81–319	20–156	44	17	12–190	14.9	2	46	5–17	10	3

Statistics from: "Missouri Tigers – Cumulative Season Statistics". CSTV.com. Archived from the original on December 12, 2007.
