= Battle Line Rivalry =

American college football rivalry game

- Arkansas Razorbacks Missouri Tigers
- First meeting: November 10, 1906; Missouri, 11–0
- Latest meeting: October 31, 2026; Missouri, 34–10
- Next meeting: 2027
- Trophy: Battle Line Trophy

Statistics
- Total meetings: 18
- All-time series: Missouri leads, 13–4
- Trophy series: Missouri leads, 11–2
- Largest victory: Missouri, 38–0 (2018)
- Longest win streak: Missouri, 5 (2016–2020), (2022-present)
- Current win streak: Missouri, 5 (2022–present)

Locations of Arkansas and Missouri

The Battle Line Rivalry is the name given to the Arkansas–Missouri football rivalry due to the state line between the two states dividing the North and South during the Civil War. It is an American college football rivalry game between the Arkansas Razorbacks and Missouri Tigers. The teams have met eighteen times, between November 1906 and October 2026. They have faced off twice in bowl games, first in the 2003 Independence Bowl and second in the 2008 Cotton Bowl Classic. The rivalry was formally introduced in 2014, and the Battle Line trophy was first awarded in 2015.

Since its inception in 2014, the rivalry had been played during rivalry week, the final week of the regular season. In 2026, it was announced that the matchup would no longer be played during rivalry week, though it would remain a protected conference rivalry, now earlier in the year. In its place, Arkansas would be paired with longtime rival LSU, and Missouri would be paired with former Big 12 rival Oklahoma during rivalry week.

== History ==
=== Pre-SEC era ===
The first meeting between the Razorbacks and Tigers was in 1906. Missouri won 11–0 in Columbia, Missouri. The two teams played each other in out of conference, regular season games in 1906, 1944, and 1963. They have met in bowl games twice.

=== SEC era ===
Missouri leads the series 9–2 since the schools began playing as SEC foes in 2014. The teams did not play in 2012 and 2013, the first two years Missouri was a member of the conference.

Starting in 2015, the winner of the game received a silver trophy outlining the states of Missouri and Arkansas with the words "Battle Line" on the border between the states. In 2014, Missouri's victory gave them a spot in the SEC Championship. The series was played on Black Friday from 2014 to 2019, with the 2020 edition scheduled for the week after due to scheduling complications from the COVID-19 pandemic.

The location of the games changes every year between Fayetteville, Arkansas in Donald W. Reynolds Razorback Stadium and Columbia, Missouri on Faurot Field.

Missouri won the first meeting as SEC opponents 21–14 in Columbia. In the first game that the trophy was on the line, the Razorbacks won 28–3. The Tigers captured the trophy for the first time in 2016, overcoming a 24–7 halftime deficit to win 28–24 in Columbia. In 2017 the Tigers kept the trophy winning 48–45 on a last second 19-yard field goal by kicker Tucker McCann.

Prior to 2014, Arkansas played LSU in the Battle for the Golden Boot in its regular season finale every year since joining the SEC in 1992. LSU played Texas A&M in its regular season finale until 2024, when Oklahoma became their new season finale opponents due to the renewal of A&M's rivalry game with the Texas Longhorns. Missouri faced the Aggies to close the 2012 and 2013 regular seasons in a continuation of the former Big 12 Conference series.

Arkansas will bring the game back to War Memorial Stadium in Little Rock in alternating years when the Razorbacks are hosting the Tigers in 2019. A year later, Missouri and the Kansas City Chiefs agreed to move the rivalry game in 2020 to Arrowhead Stadium in Kansas City, Missouri. Due to concerns caused by the COVID-19 pandemic, the 2020 game was moved back to Columbia instead of Kansas City. Due to contract negotiations falling through between the University of Arkansas and the owners of War Memorial Stadium, the 2021 and 2023 games have been moved back to Fayetteville.

== Game results ==
Arkansas victories	Missouri victories	Tie games

No.	Date	Location	Winner	Score
1	November 10, 1906	Columbia, MO	Missouri	11–0
2	September 23, 1944	St. Louis, MO	Arkansas	7–6
3	September 28, 1963	Little Rock, AR	Missouri	7–6
4	December 31, 2003	Shreveport, LA	Arkansas	27–14
5	January 1, 2008	Dallas, TX	No. 7 Missouri	38–7
6	November 28, 2014	Columbia, MO	No. 17 Missouri	21–14
7	November 27, 2015	Fayetteville, AR	Arkansas	28–3
8	November 25, 2016	Columbia, MO	Missouri*	28–24
9	November 24, 2017	Fayetteville, AR	Missouri	48–45
10	November 23, 2018	Columbia, MO	Missouri	38–0
11	November 29, 2019	Little Rock, AR	Missouri	24–14
12	December 5, 2020	Columbia, MO	Missouri	50–48
13	November 26, 2021	Fayetteville, AR	No. 25 Arkansas	34–17
14	November 25, 2022	Columbia, MO	Missouri	29–27
15	November 24, 2023	Fayetteville, AR	No. 8 Missouri	48–14
16	November 30, 2024	Columbia, MO	No. 21 Missouri	28–21
17	November 29, 2025	Fayetteville, AR	Missouri	31–17
18	October 31, 2026	Fayetteville, AR	No. 23 Missouri	34–10
Series: Missouri leads 13–4
* Missouri vacated all wins from the 2015 and 2016 seasons due to NCAA action.

== Notable games ==
=== 1906 – First meeting ===
Missouri 11, Arkansas 0

The first meeting between Arkansas and Missouri took place on November 10, 1906, and finished 11 to 0 in favor of Missouri. The game was played in Columbia, Missouri. Missouri, under head coach W.J. Monilaw (in his first season as head coach at Missouri), entered the game 4–1. Arkansas, under head coach Frank Longman (in his first season as head coach at Arkansas), entered the game 1–3–1.

=== 1944 – Season opener ===
Arkansas 7, Missouri 6

The meeting which was held on September 23, 1944, ended with a 7–6 Arkansas victory. The game was the season opener for both teams and it was a neutral site game played in St. Louis, Missouri. Arkansas was coached by Glen Rose (1st season) and would finish 5–5–1. Missouri was coached by Chauncey Simpson and would finish 3–5–2.

=== 2003 – Independence Bowl ===
	1	2	3	4	Total
Razorbacks	3	18	3	3	27
Tigers	7	0	7	0	14

Arkansas 27, Missouri 14

Arkansas and Missouri met in a bowl game for the first time on December 31, 2003, in the Independence Bowl played in Shreveport, Louisiana. Arkansas was coached by Houston Nutt (6th season) and Missouri was coached by Gary Pinkel (3rd season). Missouri ended the first quarter leading 7–3, but the Hogs scored 18 unanswered points and led 21–7 at half. Arkansas led 24–14 after three quarters and scored a field goal in the fourth quarter to win 27–14. Arkansas RB Cedric Cobbs was the game's offensive MVP (141 yds, 1 TD).

=== 2008 – Cotton Bowl ===
	1	2	3	4	Total
Tigers	7	7	14	10	38
Razorbacks	0	0	7	0	7

Missouri 38, Arkansas 7

The 2008 Cotton Bowl Classic saw Arkansas meet Missouri for the fifth time. Arkansas entered #25 and 8–4 under Reggie Herring and Missouri entered as co-Big 12 North champions; 11–2 and #7 under Gary Pinkel. Missouri RB Tony Temple found the end zone twice in the first half, from 22 and 4 yards out, and Missouri lead 14–0 at half. Temple scored again in the third quarter, from 4 yards out. Missouri took a 28–0 lead in the third quarter when William Moore returned an interception for 26 yards and a touchdown. Darren McFadden capped a 71-yard Hogs drive with a 3-yard TD run to make it 28–7. A Jeff Wolfert 32-yard field goal made it 31–7 Missouri with 10:25 in the 4th, and a 40-yard TD run from Tony Temple made it 38–7 Missouri. Tony Temple set the Cotton Bowl record with 281 rushing yards and 4 touchdowns.

=== 2014 – SEC Conference debut ===
	1	2	3	4	Total
Razorbacks	7	7	0	0	14
Tigers	0	6	0	15	21

Missouri 21, Arkansas 14

In their first meeting since 2008, the Tigers were one conference victory away from clinching the SEC East. The Razorbacks were coming into Columbia off a 2-game run on which they shut out two ranked teams. This game marked the first conference meeting between the two schools. Arkansas running back Jonathan Williams scored the first points on a 23-yard touchdown reception from quarterback Brandon Allen almost 9 minutes into the game. Less than a minute into the second quarter, Missouri kicker Andrew Baggett made a 52-yard field goal, narrowing the Arkansas lead to 4. With 7 minutes left in the half, Brandon Allen threw a 12-yard touchdown pass to wide receiver Keon Hatcher, raising the lead to 14–3. To end the half, Baggett made his second 50 plus yard field goal of the game causing the halftime score to be 14–6 Arkansas. To start the fourth quarter after an uneventful third, Missouri QB Maty Mauk threw a 4-yard TD pass to WR Jimmie Hunt. With the successful two-point conversion, the game was tied at 14 with 12 minutes left. With 4 minutes left in the game, Missouri RB Marcus Murphy scored a 12-yard touchdown run. Arkansas failed to score, giving Missouri the victory 21–14. Mizzou received the first Battle Line Rivalry Trophy, but a new trophy with a replaceable "Battle Line" was introduced the next year and that trophy has been passed back and forth since.

=== 2015 – Current Battle Line Trophy debut ===
	1	2	3	4	Total
Tigers	0	3	0	0	3
Razorbacks	7	14	7	0	28

Arkansas 28, Missouri 3

The current Battle Line trophy was at stake for the first time on November 27, 2015. The teams played in Fayetteville for the first time, making Fayetteville the sixth location in seven meetings between the teams. Arkansas entered 6–5 under Bret Bielema and Missouri entered 5–6 under Gary Pinkel, who announced his resignation—effective at the end of the season—prior to the game. Arkansas opened the scoring with two seconds left in the first quarter on a 4-yard run by running back Alex Collins. Collins scored from 7 yards out in the second quarter to give the Hogs a 14–0 lead. Missouri converted a 63-yard drive into a 35-yard Andrew Baggett field goal, making it 14–3 Hogs. Collins scored a third time from 25 yards out in the late second quarter, with the score now at 21–3. The final score of the game came with 2:15 in the third quarter, as Kody Walker found the end zone from 9 yards out to make it 28–3. Missouri found themselves in a 4th-and-10 at the UA 33 with 2:35 in the 4th, but Missouri quarterback Drew Lock threw an interception (picked off by Josh Liddell) to seal the game. The Razorbacks defeated the Tigers 28–3, closing Pinkel's 15-year tenure at Mizzou.

== See also ==
- List of NCAA college football rivalry games
