= 2007 Big 12 Championship Game =

2007 Dr Pepper Big 12 Championship Game
- Conference Championship
- 2007 Big 12 Championship logo.
Oklahoma Sooners	Missouri Tigers
(10–2)	(11–1)
38	17
Head coach: Bob Stoops	Head coach: Gary Pinkel
AP / Coaches / BCS; 9 / 8 / 9	AP / Coaches / BCS; 1 / 2 / 1
	1	2	3	4	Total
Oklahoma	0	14	14	10	38
Missouri	3	11	0	3	17
- Date: December 1, 2007
- Season: 2007
- Stadium: Alamodome
- Location: San Antonio, Texas
- MVP: QB Sam Bradford
- Favorite: Oklahoma by 3
- Referee: Clete Blakeman
- Attendance: 62,585

United States TV coverage
- Network: ABC
- Announcers: Brent Musburger and Kirk Herbstreit

The 2007 Dr Pepper Big 12 Championship Game was held on December 1, 2007 at the Alamodome in San Antonio, Texas, and pit the divisional winners from the Big 12 Conference: the Missouri Tigers, winner of the North division against the Oklahoma Sooners, winner of the South division.

Per Big 12 policy, the Big 12 North Champion was declared the home team this year. Designated "home" teams previously were 8–3 in Big 12 Championship Games.

== Regular season ==
2007 Big 12 Conference football standings
	Conf.			Overall
Team	W		L	W		L
North Division
No. 4 Missouri xy	7	–	1	12	–	2
No. 7 Kansas x%	7	–	1	12	–	1
Colorado	4	–	4	6	–	7
Kansas State	3	–	5	5	–	7
Nebraska	2	–	6	5	–	7
Iowa State	2	–	6	3	–	9
South Division
No. 8 Oklahoma xy$	6	–	2	11	–	3
No. 10 Texas	5	–	3	10	–	3
No. 22 Texas Tech	4	–	4	9	–	4
Oklahoma State	4	–	4	7	–	6
Texas A&M	4	–	4	7	–	6
Baylor	0	–	8	3	–	9
Championship: Oklahoma 38, Missouri 17
$ – BCS representative as conference champion; % – BCS at-large representative; x – Division champion/co-champions; y – Championship game participant; Rankings from AP Poll

The Big 12 South representative in the game was the Oklahoma Sooners. This was the 114th year of season play for the Sooners, who were led by head coach Bob Stoops, a two-time Walter Camp Coach of the Year award winner. The team was led on offense by quarterback Sam Bradford, and played their homes games at Gaylord Family Oklahoma Memorial Stadium in Norman, Oklahoma. The team finished their regular season 10–2 (6–2, Big 12), with their losses against Colorado and Texas Tech.

The Big 12 North representative in the championship game was the Missouri Tigers. The team was coached by Gary Pinkel, who returned in his seventh season with Mizzou, and played their home games at Faurot Field at Memorial Stadium. Quarterback Chase Daniel in his junior year led the Tigers to their first Big 12 Championship Game. The Tigers ended the regular season with a record of 11–1 (7–1, Big 12), with their only loss coming at the hands of Oklahoma.

== Game summary ==
Missouri entered the 2007 Big 12 Championship Game ranked #1 and looking for a spot in the BCS National Championship Game. Mizzou took the lead early with a 28-yard Jeff Wolfert field goal. However, on the first play of the 2nd quarter, Oklahoma's Chris Brown rushed for a 3-yard touchdown. Missouri was able to kick another field goal, this time from 18 yards out, to make it a 7-6 Sooner lead. Oklahoma struck back two drives later on a 2-yard touchdown by Chris Brown, his second of the night. Missouri drive down the field on the next drive, scoring on a 4-yard Chase Daniel run and a two-point conversion, tying the game at 14 heading into halftime. The 3rd quarter was all Oklahoma. Consistently putting pressure on Missouri quarterback Chase Daniel, the Sooner defense began to control the game. Allen Patrick scored from 4 yards out and Sam Bradford threw a 5-yard touchdown to Jermaine Gresham to give Oklahoma a 28-14 lead going into the final quarter. Early in the 4th, Wolfert hit his 3rd field goal of the night to bring the score to 28-17. Bradford and Oklahoma scored on the next drive, a 4-yard touchdown pass to Joe Jon Finley giving Oklahoma the 35-17 lead. Sooner kicker Garrett Hartley hit a 26-yard field goal to give Oklahoma a 38-17 lead and finishing off the scoring.

== See also ==
- Missouri–Oklahoma football rivalry
