= Anderson & Hester =

Mathematical system for ranking collegiate American football teams

Anderson & Hester is a mathematical system for ranking collegiate American football teams based on performance. The system was created in 1992 by Jeff Anderson and Chris Hester, roommates at the University of Washington. Anderson & Hester is one of over 40 systems listed by the NCAA as major selectors of college football national champions. The rankings are published weekly in The Seattle Times.

== National champions ==
Anderson & Hester selections from the 1997 season to present.

Season	Champion	Record	Coach
1997	Nebraska	13–0	Tom Osborne
1998	Tennessee	13–0	Phillip Fulmer
1999	Florida State	12–0	Bobby Bowden
2000	Oklahoma	13–0	Bob Stoops
2001	Miami (FL)	12–0	Larry Coker
2002	Ohio State	14–0	Jim Tressel
2003	LSU	13–1	Nick Saban
2004	USC	11–0	Pete Carroll
2005	Texas	13–0	Mack Brown
2006	Florida	13–1	Urban Meyer
2007	Missouri	12–2	Gary Pinkel
2008	Utah	13–0	Kyle Whittingham
2009	Alabama	14–0	Nick Saban (2)
2010	Auburn	14–0	Gene Chizik
2011	LSU (2)	13–1	Les Miles
2012	Alabama (2)	13–1	Nick Saban (3)
2013	Florida State (2)	14–0	Jimbo Fisher
2014	Ohio State (2)	14–1	Urban Meyer (2)
2015	Alabama (3)	14–1	Nick Saban (4)
2016	Clemson	14–1	Dabo Swinney
2017	Alabama (4)	13–1	Nick Saban (5)
2018	Clemson (2)	15–0	Dabo Swinney (2)
2019	LSU (3)	15–0	Ed Orgeron
2020	Alabama (5)	13–0	Nick Saban (6)
2021	Georgia	14–1	Kirby Smart
2022	Georgia (2)	15-0	Kirby Smart (2)
2023	Michigan	15–0	Jim Harbaugh
2024	Oregon	13–1	Dan Lanning
2025	Indiana	16-0	Curt Cignetti
