= 2007 Oklahoma State Cowboys football team =

American college football season

2007 Oklahoma State Cowboys football

Insight Bowl champion

Insight Bowl, W 49–33 vs. Indiana
- Conference: Big 12 Conference
- South
- Record: 7–6 (4–4 Big 12)
- Head coach: Mike Gundy (3rd season)
- Offensive coordinator: Larry Fedora (3rd season)
- Offensive scheme: Spread
- Defensive coordinator: Tim Beckman (1st season)
- Base defense: 4–3
- Home stadium: Boone Pickens Stadium

2007 Big 12 Conference football standings
	Conf.			Overall
Team	W		L	W		L
North Division
No. 4 Missouri xy	7	–	1	12	–	2
No. 7 Kansas x%	7	–	1	12	–	1
Colorado	4	–	4	6	–	7
Kansas State	3	–	5	5	–	7
Nebraska	2	–	6	5	–	7
Iowa State	2	–	6	3	–	9
South Division
No. 8 Oklahoma xy$	6	–	2	11	–	3
No. 10 Texas	5	–	3	10	–	3
No. 22 Texas Tech	4	–	4	9	–	4
Oklahoma State	4	–	4	7	–	6
Texas A&M	4	–	4	7	–	6
Baylor	0	–	8	3	–	9
Championship: Oklahoma 38, Missouri 17
$ – BCS representative as conference champion; % – BCS at-large representative; x – Division champion/co-champions; y – Championship game participant; Rankings from AP Poll

The 2007 Oklahoma State Cowboys football team represented Oklahoma State University during the 2007 NCAA Division I FBS football season. The team participated as members of the Big 12 Conference in the South Division. They played their home games at Boone Pickens Stadium in Stillwater, Oklahoma and were coached by Mike Gundy.

== Personnel ==
=== Coaching staff ===
- Head coach: Mike Gundy
- Assistants: Nelson Barnes, Tim Beckman, Todd Bradford, Joe DeForest, Larry Fedora, Curtis Luper, Doug Meacham, Joe Wickline

== Schedule ==
Date	Time	Opponent	Site	TV	Result	Attendance
September 1	5:45 p.m.	at No. 13 Georgia*	Sanford Stadium; Athens, Georgia	ESPN2	L 14–35	92,746
September 8	6:05 p.m.	Florida Atlantic*	Boone Pickens Stadium; Stillwater, Oklahoma		W 42–6	38,176
September 14	7:00 p.m.	at Troy*	Movie Gallery Stadium; Troy, Alabama	ESPN2	L 23–41	24,102
September 22	2:30 p.m.	Texas Tech	Boone Pickens Stadium; Stillwater, Oklahoma	FSN	W 49–45	37,850
September 29	6:00 p.m.	No. 15 (FCS) Sam Houston State*	Boone Pickens Stadium; Stillwater, Oklahoma		W 39–3	41,139
October 6	6:30 p.m.	at Texas A&M	Kyle Field; College Station, Texas	FSN	L 23–24	86,217
October 13	11:30 a.m.	at Nebraska	Memorial Stadium; Lincoln, Nebraska	FSN PPV	W 45–14	84,334
October 20	6:05 p.m.	No. 25 Kansas State^{†}	Boone Pickens Stadium; Stillwater, Oklahoma	FCS	W 41–39	41,725
November 3	2:30 p.m.	No. 14 Texas	Boone Pickens Stadium; Stillwater, Oklahoma	ABC	L 35–38	41,406
November 10	7:00 p.m.	No. 5 Kansas	Boone Pickens Stadium; Stillwater, Oklahoma	ABC	L 28–43	39,848
November 17	6:00 p.m.	at Baylor	Floyd Casey Stadium; Waco, Texas	FSN	W 45–14	28,159
November 24	2:30 p.m.	at No. 10 Oklahoma	Gaylord Family Oklahoma Memorial Stadium; Norman, Oklahoma (Bedlam Game)	FSN	L 17–49	85,238
December 31	5:00 p.m.	vs. Indiana*	Sun Devil Stadium; Tempe, Arizona (Insight Bowl)	NFLN	W 49–33	48,892
*Non-conference game; ^{†}Homecoming; Rankings from AP Poll released prior to the game; All times are in Central time

== Game summaries ==
=== at Nebraska ===
Oklahoma State at Nebraska

Team	1	2	3	4	Total
• Cowboys	17	21	0	7	45
Cornhuskers	0	0	0	14	14

- Date: Saturday, October 13
- Location: Memorial Stadium, Lincoln, Nebraska
- Game start: 12:30 p.m. EST
- TV announcers (FSN PPV): Greg Sharpe, Kellen Winslow, Joel Goldberg
- Source: ESPN

Scoring summary
1	11:34	OKST	Julius Crosslin 1-yard run (Jason Ricks kick)	OKST 7-0
1	6:08	OKST	Jason Ricks 21-yard field goal	OKST 10-0
1	4:06	OKST	Seth Newton 41-yard pass from Zac Robinson (Jason Ricks kick)	OKST 17-0
2	10:39	OKST	Kendall Hunter 33-yard run (Jason Ricks kick)	OKST 24-0
2	5:51	OKST	Julius Crosslin 1-yard run (Jason Ricks kick)	OKST 31-0
2	1:54	OKST	Zac Robinson 1-yard run (Jason Ricks kick)	OKST 38-0
4	14:55	NEB	J.B. Phillips 13-yard pass from Sam Keller (Alex Henery kick)	OKST 38-7
4	5:25	OKST	Dantrell Savage 30-yard run (Dan Bailey kick)	OKST 45-7
4	0:39	NEB	Thomas Lawson 1-yard pass from Sam Keller (Alex Henery kick)	OKST 45-14

Oklahoma State's first win in Lincoln since 1960.

== Awards ==
- All-Big 12: Adarius Bowman (2nd), Dave Koenig (2nd), Nathan Peterson (2nd), Brandon Pettigrew (1st), Dantrell Savage (1st)

== 2007 team players in the NFL ==
No one from the Cowboys was selected in the 2008 NFL draft.

- Julius Crosslin was signed as an undrafted free agent by the Dallas Cowboys.
- Dantrell Savage was signed as an undrafted free agent by the Kansas City Chiefs.
- Donovan Woods was signed as an undrafted free agent by the Pittsburgh Steelers.
