= 2007 Kansas State Wildcats football team =

American college football season

2007 Kansas State Wildcats football
- Conference: Big 12 Conference
- North
- Record: 5–7 (3–5 Big 12)
- Head coach: Ron Prince (2nd season)
- Offensive coordinator: James Franklin (2nd season)
- Offensive scheme: Spread
- Defensive coordinator: Tim Tibesar (1st season)
- Base defense: 3–4
- Home stadium: Bill Snyder Family Football Stadium

Uniform

2007 Big 12 Conference football standings
	Conf.			Overall
Team	W		L	W		L
North Division
No. 4 Missouri xy	7	–	1	12	–	2
No. 7 Kansas x%	7	–	1	12	–	1
Colorado	4	–	4	6	–	7
Kansas State	3	–	5	5	–	7
Nebraska	2	–	6	5	–	7
Iowa State	2	–	6	3	–	9
South Division
No. 8 Oklahoma xy$	6	–	2	11	–	3
No. 10 Texas	5	–	3	10	–	3
No. 22 Texas Tech	4	–	4	9	–	4
Oklahoma State	4	–	4	7	–	6
Texas A&M	4	–	4	7	–	6
Baylor	0	–	8	3	–	9
Championship: Oklahoma 38, Missouri 17
$ – BCS representative as conference champion; % – BCS at-large representative; x – Division champion/co-champions; y – Championship game participant; Rankings from AP Poll

The 2007 Kansas State Wildcats football team represented Kansas State University in the 2007 NCAA Division I FBS football season. The team's head football coach was Ron Prince. The Wildcats played their home games in Bill Snyder Family Stadium. 2007 saw the Wildcats finish with a record of 5–7, and a 3–5 record in Big 12 Conference play.

== Schedule ==
Date	Time	Opponent	Rank	Site	TV	Result	Attendance	Source
September 1	6:45 p.m.	at No. 18 Auburn*		Jordan-Hare Stadium; Auburn, AL	ESPN	L 13–23	86,439	
September 8	6:00 p.m.	San Jose State*		Bill Snyder Family Football Stadium; Manhattan, KS		W 34–14	45,545	
September 15	6:00 p.m.	Missouri State*		Bill Snyder Family Football Stadium; Manhattan, KS		W 61–10	46,825	
September 29	2:30 p.m.	at No. 7 Texas		Darrell K Royal–Texas Memorial Stadium; Austin, TX	ABC	W 41–21	84,864	
October 6	11:00 a.m.	Kansas	No. 24	Bill Snyder Family Football Stadium; Manhattan, KS (rivalry)	FSN	L 24–30	50,924	
October 13	8:00 p.m.	Colorado		Bill Snyder Family Football Stadium; Manhattan, KS (rivalry)	ESPN2	W 47–20	46,637	
October 20	6:05 p.m.	at Oklahoma State	No. 25	Boone Pickens Stadium; Stillwater, OK		L 39–41	41,725	
October 27	1:00 p.m.	Baylor^{†}		Bill Snyder Family Football Stadium; Manhattan, KS		W 51–13	45,959	
November 3	11:30 a.m.	at Iowa State		Jack Trice Stadium; Ames, IA (rivalry)	Versus	L 20–31	45,551	
November 10	11:30 a.m.	at Nebraska		Memorial Stadium; Lincoln, NE (rivalry)	Versus	L 31–73	84,665	
November 17	11:30 a.m.	No. 6 Missouri		Bill Snyder Family Football Stadium; Manhattan, KS	FSN	L 32–49	48,406	
November 24	2:30 p.m.	at Fresno State*		Bulldog Stadium; Fresno, CA	ESPN2	L 29–45	34,671	
*Non-conference game; ^{†}Homecoming; Rankings from AP Poll released prior to the game; All times are in Central time

== Coaching staff ==
Name	Position	Years at KSU
Ron Prince	Head coach	2
Tim Tibesar	Defensive Coordinator	2
James Franklin	Offensive Coordinator	2
Ricky Rahne	Running Backs	1
Tim McCarty	Assistant Head Coach, Offensive Line	2
Mo Latimore	Defensive Line	22
Frank Leonard	Tight Ends	1
Dave Brock	Wide Receivers	1
Greg Burns	Defensive Backs	1
Matt Wallerstedt	Linebackers/Special Teams	1
Devin Fitzsimmons	Graduate Assistant–Offensive	1
Josh Kotelnicki	Graduate Assistant–Defensive	1

== Game summaries ==
=== Auburn ===
Coming into the game, Auburn was favored by 13½.

Auburn quarterback Brandon Cox threw a touchdown pass to Gabe McKenzie with 2:01 remaining in the fourth quarter and Antonio Coleman returned a fumble for a score moments later to give No. 18 Auburn a 23–13 win over Kansas State.

Auburn's offense struggled all night, and Kansas State seemed poised for its 18th straight season-opening win, the first against a ranked opponent on the road.

Josh Freeman completed 32 of 57 passes for 268 yards and was intercepted twice, including on Kansas State's final possession after Coleman's fumble return.

Freeman's passing numbers rank as some of the best in school history. His 32 completions rank as the second-most in school history and most since Chad May had 33 against Kansas on Oct. 6, 1994, while his 57 attempts are the third-most in school history and the most since Dennis Morrison had 59 against Iowa State on Oct. 21, 1972.

With the Wildcats trailing 6–3 after a first half dominated by defense, Kansas State's Marcus Watts intercepted Cox at the Wildcats 31 on the first play of the third quarter. Freeman directed the offense to the Auburn 21, and it was time for a trick.

Freeman took the snap and turned left, tossing a lateral to wide receiver Jordy Nelson on a third-and-6 play. Nelson heaved the ball deep to Leon Patton, who was all alone in the right side of the end zone for the first touchdown of the game.

Kansas State held Auburn to only 62 yards rushing.

	1	2	3	4	Total
Kansas State	3	0	10	0	13
# 18 Auburn	0	6	3	14	23

=== San Jose State ===
see also 2007 San Jose State Spartans football team

Kansas State was favored by 17 points going into the game.

Josh Freeman threw for 272 yards and a touchdown and ran for a score in Kansas State's 34–14 victory over San Jose State.

James Johnson ran for 111 yards and one touchdown for Kansas State (1–1), which won its 18th straight home opener and avoided its first 0–2 start since losing its first three games in 1989.

Deon Murphy caught Freeman's touchdown pass and ran 21 yards on a reverse for a 34–7 lead for the Wildcats, who had 153 yards rushing Saturday night after being held to 27 in last week's 23–13 loss at Auburn.

Brooks Rossman kicked field goals of 26 yards in the first quarter and 43 yards in the fourth for Kansas State.

	1	2	3	4	Total
San Jose State	0	7	0	7	14
Kansas State	10	7	0	17	34

=== Missouri State ===
Senior Jordy Nelson set single-game school records with 15 receptions for 209 yards, catching one touchdown pass and throwing another in Kansas State's 61–10 victory over Missouri State.

James Johnson ran for 114 yards and three touchdowns for Kansas State (2–1), which scored touchdowns on its first three possessions against the Bears (2–1) and opened the second half with three straight TD drives and a punt return for another score. Deon Murphy caught Nelson's touchdown pass on a trick play and returned a punt 80 yards early in the fourth quarter for a 54–10 lead.

Nelson's 18-yard catch from Josh Freeman late in the third quarter, putting the Wildcats up 47–10, was the senior's 14th reception of the game. That broke Michael Smith's record of 13 catches against Missouri in 1989 and gave Nelson 207 yards receiving, breaking Darnell McDonald's record of 206 yards set against Syracuse in the 1997 Fiesta Bowl.

Terry Petrie ran 3 yards for Kansas State's final score in the closing minutes. The Wildcats broke the 60-point mark for the first time since a 64–0 win over Kansas in 2002.

Freeman was 26-for-39 for 287 yards and didn't throw an interception, breaking a string of five games in which he threw at least one pick.

Missouri State coach Terry Allen lost for the sixth straight time against Kansas State. He coached Northern Iowa to a 10–8 victory in Manhattan in 1989—the last time Kansas State lost a home opener—but was 0–5 against the Wildcats as Kansas coach from 1997 to 2001.

	1	2	3	4	Total
Missouri State	0	7	3	0	10
Kansas State	21	6	20	14	61

=== Texas ===
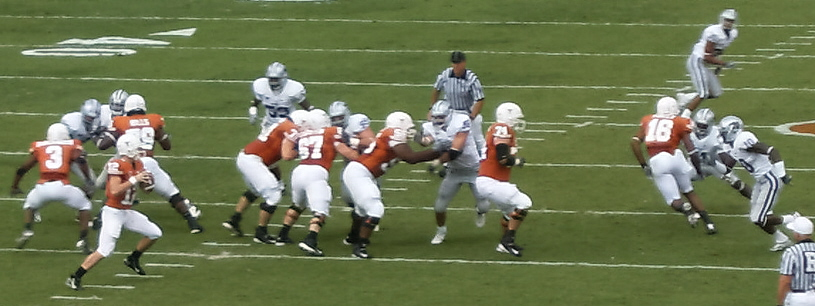
McCoy drops back to pass

Texas was favored by 15½ coming into the game.

Two kick returns for touchdowns and an interception return for another score propelled the Wildcats to a 41–21 win over the No. 7 Longhorns, handing Texas its worst home defeat in 10 years under coach Mack Brown.

Linebacker Ian Campbell scored on a 41-yard interception return in the second quarter and James Johnson took a kickoff 85 yards for a 21–14 lead moments after Texas had tied the score.

Jordy Nelson's 89-yard punt return in the third put the Wildcats up 34–21 and all but sealed their second consecutive victory over Texas.

Kansas State (3–1, 1–0) scored on its opening drive, then didn't need another offensive touchdown until the fourth quarter. The Wildcats put up the most points scored against Texas (4–1, 0–1) in Austin since 1997, the Longhorns' infamous "Rout 66" loss to UCLA, 66–3.

That blowout came under former coach John Mackovic. Until Saturday, Brown's worst home loss was a 35–17 defeat by Kansas State in 1999. It was also Texas' first loss in a Big 12 opener since 1998, which also came against the Wildcats.

	1	2	3	4	Total
Kansas State	7	17	10	7	41
#7 Texas	7	7	7	0	21

=== Kansas ===
The Wildcats were favored by 3 going into the game.

Sophomore quarterback Josh Freeman threw for 305 yards and one touchdown and senior wide receiver Jordy Nelson had 10 catches for 137 yards and a score, as Kansas State dropped a 30-24 decision to archrival Kansas at Bill Snyder Family Stadium.

Kansas quarterback Todd Reesing threw for 267 yards and three touchdowns and the Jayhawks overcame some potentially ruinous mistakes to beat their in-state rivals and start a season 5-0 for just the third time in 39 years.

Freeman, Kansas State's 6 ft-6 in sophomore, outgained the 5-9 Reesing, hitting 31 of 48 passes for 305 yards and a touchdown. But he was also intercepted three times, the last by Aqib Talib, Kansas' two-way star, with 1:12 to play.

Talib, beaten on a 68-yard touchdown pass by Jordy Nelson in the first quarter, got his payback just before halftime when he somehow was left uncovered and caught a 5-yard touchdown pass that tied it 14–14 at halftime. It was the sixth consecutive game the all-Big 12 cornerback had scored a touchdown.

Nelson, who came into the game with 42 catches for 497 yards and was the Big 12 offensive player of the week after the Texas win, caught 10 balls for 137 yards and a TD in Kansas State's first game as a ranked team in three years.

Working against Talib, he made two outstanding catches on the 11-play, 80-yard drive that gave Kansas State a 14–7 lead late in the half.

Stretched out full length and keeping on his toes just inches onto the edge of the playing field while falling out of bounds, Nelson picked up 15 yards to the Kansas 43

The Jayhawks got their first touchdown on Kansas State's home field since 1999 when Jake Sharp, apparently stopped for a short gain, burst out of a gang of tacklers and sped 20 yards to make it 7–7 with 9:11 left in the first half. Sharp had picked up 14 yards the previous play.

	1	2	3	4	Total
Kansas	0	14	7	9	30
# 24 Kansas State	7	7	3	7	24

=== Colorado ===
Kansas State was favored by 5 going into the game.

James Johnson ran for 159 yards and two scores, Deon Murphy caught one touchdown pass and scored on a 20-yard reverse in leading the Wildcats with a 47–20 victory.

Johnson opened Kansas State's scoring with a 5-yard run in the first quarter and closed it with a 63-yard TD burst late in the fourth.

Brooks Rossman kicked four field goals for the Wildcats (4–2, 2–1 Big 12), including a 52-yarder as time ran out in the first half for a 23–13 lead. He was the first Kansas State player with four field goals in a game since Joe Rheem hit four against Louisiana–Lafayette on Sept. 18, 2004.

	1	2	3	4	Total
Colorado	3	10	7	0	20
Kansas State	17	6	17	7	47

=== Oklahoma State ===
The Cowboys were favored by 3 going into the game.

Jason Ricks kicked a 26-yard field goal with 2 seconds remaining and Oklahoma State overcame the best passing performance of Josh Freeman's career to beat No. 25 Kansas State 41–39.

The Wildcats (4–3, 2–2 Big 12) called all three of their timeouts as Ricks was setting up, but his kick was right down the middle to cap a comeback made necessary when K-State coach Ron Prince decided to go for two points instead of the tie after Leon Patton's 11-yard touchdown run with 1:10 remaining.

Josh Freeman threw for a career-best 404 yards and three touchdowns to star receiver Jordy Nelson, who also caught the go-ahead 2-point conversion, but it wasn't enough for the Wildcats.

Nelson finished with 176 yards on 12 receptions. He had a 17-yard touchdown catch as K-State opened an early 14–0 lead, and he beat cornerback Perrish Cox down the left side for a 46-yard TD grab that made it 21–7.

	1	2	3	4	Total
#25 Kansas State	14	7	7	11	39
Oklahoma State	7	10	7	17	41

=== Baylor ===
The Wildcats were favored by 25½ coming into the game. Josh Freeman threw touchdown passes on three straight possessions to open the second half, and wide receiver Jordy Nelson broke another school record in Kansas State's 51–13 victory over Baylor.

Nelson had eight catches for 105 yards and broke the Kansas State record for receptions in a season. His 8-yard catch from backup Carson Coffman was his 76th this year, breaking Darnell McDonald's mark of 75 in 1998.

Nelson added a 92-yard punt return for Kansas State's last touchdown in the closing seconds of the game. Earlier this year, he set single-game records with 15 catches for 109 yards in a 61–10 win over Missouri State.

Freeman threw for 247 yards and had two 1-yard TD carries for the Wildcats (5–3, 3-2 Big 12), who pulled away from a 10-point halftime lead to hand Baylor (3–6, 0–5) its eighth straight conference loss. Kansas State's Brooks Rossman kicked three field goals.

Leon Patton had 115 yards on 17 carries for Kansas State, and Daniel Gonzalez caught seven passes for 104 yards and a touchdown.

Baylor committed seven turnovers and managed just 13 yards rushing against Kansas State's defense, which gave up 329 yards on the ground in the previous week's 41–39 loss at Oklahoma State. By the time quarterback Blake Szymanski came in, it was too late to save the Bears' passing game after fill-in Michael Machen struggled.

	1	2	3	4	Total
Baylor	0	6	0	7	13
Kansas State	10	6	21	14	51

=== Iowa State ===
Kansas State was favored by 14 points going into the game.

Jordy Nelson recorded his second 200-yard receiving effort and re-established the KSU single-game receiving yards record, but it was not enough as Iowa State stunned Kansas State 31–20.

Nelson, a Biletnikoff Award semifinalist, hauled in game-highs of 14 receptions for a school-record 214 yards and a touchdown. The former walk-on from Riley, Kansas, moved into third-place in school history for career receiving yards with 2,418 and is just 39 yards from tying Michael Smith (1988–91) for second. His second quarter 13-yard touchdown reception was the 17th in his career and moved him into fourth in school history.

The game got off to an inauspicious start for K-State, as kick returner James Johnson fumbled the opening kickoff and was recovered by Iowa State's James Smith at the Wildcat 32. The Cyclones (2–8, 1-5 Big 12) quickly capitalized, as Brett Meyer found Derrick Catlett from one-yard out for the early 7–0 advantage.

	1	2	3	4	Total
Kansas State	0	10	10	0	20
Iowa State	14	7	7	3	31

=== Nebraska ===
Kansas State was favored by 7½ going into the game.

Kansas State had two 100-yard receivers and James Johnson rushed for over 100 yards but Nebraska held the upper hand Saturday in a 73–31 win in Lincoln.

Joe Ganz threw for 510 yards and seven touchdowns to set school records and Nebraska scored on 11 straight possessions while ending a five-game losing streak in the win over the Wildcats.

Kansas State (5–5, 3–4) hadn't given up so many points since a 75–28 defeat to Oklahoma in 1971.

Nebraska's defense pressured Josh Freeman all day, sacking him four times. The Wildcats had 428 yards, but most came after the game was out of hand. Jordy Nelson set a new school record for receiving yards in a season after collecting 125 yards on nine catches, breaking James Terry's mark of 1,232 set back in 2003. The 100-yard receiving effort was also his seventh of the season, a new K-State record.

Nebraska had 702 total yards, which were the most since the 1995 team had 776 against Iowa State.

	1	2	3	4	Total
Kansas State	10	0	7	14	31
Nebraska	14	24	14	21	73

=== Missouri ===
The Tigers were favored by 7 points going into the game.

Kansas State's James Johnson rushed for a career-high 172 yards and surpassed 1,000 yards on the season, but No. 6 Missouri proved to be too much for K-State. This made for the first three-game losing streak for the Wildcats since the 2005 season.

Missouri's Jeremy Maclin scored three touchdowns and had 252 total yards to set the NCAA single-season freshman record for all-purpose yards, helping the No. 6 Tigers rally from a sluggish first half for a 49–32 win.

Maclin returned a kickoff 99 yards for a touchdown and caught two touchdown passes, giving him 2,201 all-purpose yards for the season – 175 more than Terrell Willis of Rutgers had in 1993. Maclin finished with nine catches for 143 yards.

Chase Daniel threw for 284 yards and four touchdowns, including two to tight end Martin Rucker, helping Missouri (10–1, 6–1 Big 12) to its first win in Manhattan since 1989.

	1	2	3	4	Total
#6 Missouri	14	7	14	14	49
Kansas State	9	9	7	7	32

=== Fresno State ===
The Bulldogs were favored by 1 point going into the game.

Tom Brandstater passed for a career-high 313 yards and two touchdowns to Marlon Moore, and Fresno State knocked Kansas State from bowl contention with 45–29.

Anthony Harding rushed for a career-best 115 yards and a touchdown and backfield mate Lonyae Miller added 91 yards and a score for Fresno State (7–4).

The Bulldogs, members of the Western Athletic Conference, snapped a seven-game losing streak to teams from Bowl Championship Series conferences, a skid that dated to the 2004 MPC Computers Bowl against Virginia.

Kansas State (5–7), which needed a victory to become bowl eligible, ended the season on a four-game losing streak under second-year coach Ron Prince.

Receiver Jordy Nelson led the Wildcats with 15 catches for 165 yards and a touchdown. Tailback James Johnson had 71 rushing yards, including a 67-yard score on the game's first drive.

Kansas State was making its first visit to California since 2001 when the Wildcats defeated USC.

	1	2	3	4	Total
Kansas State	14	7	0	8	29
Fresno State	10	21	14	0	45

== Rankings ==
Ranking movements Legend: ██ Increase in ranking ██ Decrease in ranking — = Not ranked RV = Received votes
	Week															
Poll	Pre	1	2	3	4	5	6	7	8	9	10	11	12	13	14	Final
AP	—	—	—	—	—	24	RV	25	RV	RV	—	—	—	—	—	—
Coaches	RV	—	—	—	—	RV	RV	RV	RV	RV	—	—	—	—	—	—
Harris	Not released				—	RV	RV	RV	RV	RV	—	—	—	—	—	Not released
BCS	Not released							—	—	—	—	—	—	—	—	Not released

== Statistics ==
=== Team ===
	Team	Opp
Scoring	422	370
Points per game	35.2	30.8
First downs	267	263
Rushing	86	97
Passing	167	138
Penalty	14	28
Total offense	5018	4807
Avg per play	5.8	5.5
Avg per game	418.2	400.6
Fumbles-Lost	24-10	18–9
Penalties-Yards	98-903	80-694
Avg per game	8.2	6.6

	Team	Opp
Punts-Yards	58-2583	63–2277
Avg per punt	44.5	36.1
Time of possession/Game	27:55	32:05
3rd down conversions	40%	36%
4th down conversions	43%	54%
Touchdowns scored	51	48
Field goals-Attempts-Long	22-28	12–14
PAT-Attempts	46-49	46–47
Attendance	284,296	377,915
Games/Avg per Game	6/47,383	6/62,986

==== Scores by quarter ====
	1	2	3	4	Total
Kansas State	122	82	112	106	422
Opponents	69	126	83	92	370

=== Offense ===
==== Rushing ====
Name	GP	Att	Gain	Loss	Net	Avg	TD	Long	Avg/G
James Johnson	12	174	1161	58	1106	6.4	12	68	92.2
Leon Patton	12	83	409	19	390	4.7	4	45	32.5
Deon Murphy	12	15	103	20	83	5.5	2	21	6.9
Terry Petrie	5	12	66	0	66	5.5	1	17	13.2
Jeremy Reed	2	5	25	0	25	5.0	0	9	12.5
Carson Coffman	4	2	0	3	-3	-1.5	0	0	-0.8
Jordy Nelson	12	3	2	9	-7	-2.3	0	1	-0.6
Josh Freeman	12	53	124	164	-40	-0.8	4	15	-3.3
TEAM	5	4	0	27	-27	-6.8	0	0	-5.4
Total	12	351	1893	300	1593	4.5	23	68	132.8
Opponents	12	464	2021	322	1699	3.7	16	45	141.6

==== Passing ====
Name	GP	Effic	Att-Cmp-Int	Pct	Yds	TD	Lng	Avg/G
Josh Freeman	12	127.3	316-499-11	63.3	3353	18	68	279.4
Carson Coffman	4	97.0	3-5-0	60	22	0	12	5.5
Jordy Nelson	12	309.5	2-4-0	50	45	2	24	3.8
Leon Patton	12	472.0	1-1-0	100	5	1	5	0.4
Marcus Watts	11	-200	0-1-1	0.0	0	0	0	0.0
Total	12	128.4	322-510-12	63.1	3425	21	68	285.4
Opponents	12	136.6	248413-17	60.0	3108	27	55	259.0

==== Receiving ====
Name	GP	No.	Yds	Avg	TD	Long	Avg/G
Jordy Nelson	12	122	1606	13.2	11	68	113.8
Deon Murphy	12	57	605	10.6	5	66	50.4
James Johnson	12	34	220	6.5	0	19	18.3
Jeron Mastrud	12	30	316	10.5	0	29	26.3
Daniel Gonzalez	12	26	307	11.8	1	40	25.6
Michael Pooschke	12	21	160	7.6	0	22	13.3
Leon Patton	12	15	62	4.1	1	21	5.2
Ernie Pierce	8	6	59	9.8	2	20	7.4
Cedric Wilson	12	5	46	9.2	0	14	3.8
Lamark Brown	8	3	33	11.0	0	13	4.1
Tony Purvis	1	1	6	6.0	0	6	6.0
Terry Petrie	5	1	4	4.0	0	4	0.8
Brett Alstatt	12	1	1	1.0	1	1	0.1
Total	12	322	3425	10.6	21	68	285.4
Opponents	12	248	3108	12.5	27	55	259.0
