= Reggie Herring =

American football player and coach (born 1959)

Personal information
- Born: July 3, 1959 (age 67); Myrtle Beach, South Carolina, U.S.

Career information
- High school: Astronaut (Titusville)
- College: Florida State (1978–1980)

Career history
- Oklahoma State (1981) Graduate assistant; Oklahoma State (1982–1985) Linebackers coach; Auburn (1986–1991) Linebackers coach; TCU (1992–1993) Defensive coordinator; Clemson (1994–1996) Linebackers coach; Clemson (1997–2001) Defensive Coordinator; Houston Texans (2002–2003) Linebackers coach; NC State (2004) Defensive coordinator & linebackers coach; Arkansas (2005–2007) Defensive coordinator & linebackers coach; Dallas Cowboys (2008–2010) Linebackers coach; Houston Texans (2011–2013) Linebackers coach; Chicago Bears (2014) Linebackers coach; Denver Broncos (2015–2021) Linebackers coach

Awards and highlights
- Super Bowl champion (50); Second-team All-American (1980)

Head coaching record
- Postseason: Bowl games: 0–1 (.000)

Reginald Wayne Herring (born July 3, 1959) is an American football coach and former player and most recently the linebackers coach for the Denver Broncos of the National Football League (NFL). A former linebacker at Florida State University, he began his coaching career in 1981. He has now coached for 36 years across college and the NFL. Herring arrived in Denver to coach linebackers in 2015 after previous stops in the league with Chicago (2014), Houston (2002–03, ’11–13) and Dallas (2008–10). Herring has coached nine linebackers who have made Pro Bowl appearances during their careers, including defensive end Mario Williams (4), outside linebackers DeMarcus Ware, (9)Connor Barwin (1), and inside linebackers Zach Thomas (7), Keith Brooking (5), Lance Briggs (7), Brian Cushing (1), Sean Lee (2) and DeMeco Ryans (2). Herring also served as the interim head football coach for the University of Arkansas in the 2008 Cotton Bowl Classic.

== College career ==
Herring played at Florida State University from 1978 to 1980, earning his bachelor's degree in criminology. As a player, he was a three-year starting linebacker, leading the team in tackles for three consecutive years. His 452 total tackles in his career ranks him third all-time for tackles in Florida State history and his 170 tackles during his 1980 senior season also ranks him third on the single-season tackle list. During his career with the Florida State Seminoles, he played in two Orange Bowls and one Tangerine Bowl, serving as team captain for the 1980 team that made it to the Orange Bowl. His final two years at FSU, the Seminoles finished 11–1 and 10–2 and ranked in the top 10 in the final AP poll. In 1989, Herring was inducted into the Florida State Hall of Fame.

== Coaching career ==
=== Early career ===
Herring first served as a graduate assistant coach at Oklahoma State University in 1981 under head coach Jimmy Johnson. After one year, Johnson promoted Herring to coach OSU's linebackers, a position that he would hold until 1985. While at Oklahoma State, Herring helped launch Matt Monger's college career, believing in him (a walk-on player) when they were short on healthy linebackers. He intuition paid off at Monger became the leading tackler at Oklahoma State for 1983 and 1984, and was later drafted by the New York Jets. Playing for both the Jets and the Buffalo Bills during his NFL career.

Also during this time, Herring worked with quarterbacks coach Houston Nutt, under whom Herring would later serve as defensive coordinator at the University of Arkansas. In 1986, Herring left OSU to coach linebackers at Auburn University under head coach Pat Dye. At Auburn, Herring helped lead the Tigers to three consecutive SEC titles from 1987 to 1989.

In 1992, Herring was offered his first defensive coordinator position, though he continued to coach linebackers, at Texas Christian University. After two years at TCU, Herring left to coach linebackers at Clemson University. Herring was promoted to defensive coordinator for the Tigers for the 1997 season, and held that position through the 2001 season. The Tigers made six bowl appearances during that stretch as seven of Herring's linebackers were selected in the NFL Draft. In 2002, Herring accepted a position in the NFL with the Houston Texans to coach linebackers, after having been on the job as defensive coordinator at Ole Miss for less than a month. Although Herring only held the Texans position for two years, he coached the 2003 league-leader in tackles, Jamie Sharper. In 2004, Herring left the NFL to become defensive coordinator and linebackers coach at North Carolina State University. In his first year at North Carolina State, the Wolfpack defense led the nation in total defense after ranking 89th in that category the year prior.

=== Arkansas ===
In 2005, Herring left North Carolina State for a defensive coordinator position with Houston Nutt at the University of Arkansas. At Arkansas, Herring improved the Razorback defense in almost every statistical category. In the 2006 season, Herring led a defense ranked 44th out of 119 Division I-A FBS teams. For his performance in the 2006 season, Herring was a finalist for the Broyles Award, given annually the nation's top assistant coach in college football.

On November 26, 2007, after Houston Nutt was forced to resign, Herring was announced as the interim coach of the Razorbacks for the Cotton Bowl Classic. The 24th-ranked Razorbacks lost the game 38–7 to 7th-ranked Missouri. He had said about the Capital One Bowl that his team needed to "...punch Mickey Mouse in the mouth."

=== Texas A&M ===
On January 4, 2008, Herring was named the defensive coordinator at Texas A&M by head coach Mike Sherman. Herring took part in the Aggies' 2008 recruiting, and resigned after National Signing Day to return to the NFL and become the linebackers coach at the Dallas Cowboys.

=== Dallas Cowboys ===
Herring was hired by the Dallas Cowboys on February 8, 2008. He worked as the team's linebacker position coach under head coach Wade Phillips. With the help of his tutelage, the Cowboys led the NFL in quarterback sacks (59) during the 2008 season. As linebackers coach for Dallas from 2008 to 2010, Herring helped outside linebacker DeMarcus Ware deliver the most productive three-season stretch of his career.

=== Houston Texans ===
Herring joined new Houston Texans defensive coordinator Wade Phillips in January 2011. Herring coached in his second stint with the Texans from 2011 to 2013. He was part of a staff that helped turn the league's 30th-ranked defensive unit into a group that ranked fourth overall (308.8 ypg) during his three years with the club.

=== Chicago Bears ===
Herring joined Marc Trestman's coaching staff as Chicago Bears linebackers coach on January 22, 2014. However, he was released by the team on January 20, 2015.

=== Denver Broncos ===
Herring joined Gary Kubiak's coaching staff as Denver Broncos linebackers coach on January 26, 2015. Herring helped Denver's defensive transition to a 3–4 alignment in 2015. On February 7, 2016, Herring was part of the Broncos coaching staff that won Super Bowl 50. In the game, the Broncos defeated the Carolina Panthers by a score of 24–10. Coaching Denver's inside linebackers for the last three seasons, Herring helped lead a defense that allowed a league-low 296.4 yards per game during that span.

== Personal life ==
Herring is married to the former Lisa Ward of Griffin, Georgia. The couple has a daughter, Caroline, and a son, Adam, who is a former linebacker on the Auburn football team and now coaches at University of Texas at Austin.

== Head coaching record ==
Year	Team	Overall	Conference	Standing	Bowl/playoffs
Arkansas Razorbacks (Southeastern Conference) (2007)
2007	Arkansas	0–1 (Note: Houston Nutt coached the first 12 games of the season and resigned before the Cotton Bowl.)			L Cotton
Arkansas:		0–1			
Total:		0–1			
