= 2008 Cotton Bowl Classic =

2008 AT&T Cotton Bowl Classic
- 72nd Cotton Bowl Classic
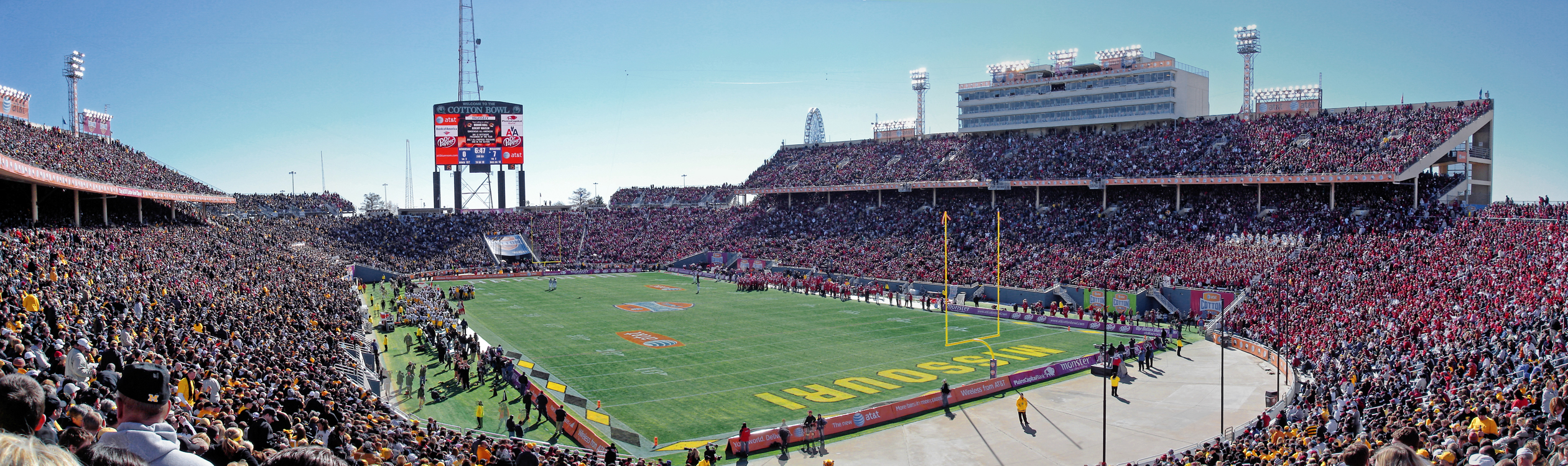
- The Cotton Bowl during the Cotton Bowl Classic between the Arkansas Razorbacks and the Missouri Tigers.
Missouri Tigers	Arkansas Razorbacks
(11–2)	(8–4)
Big 12	SEC
38	7
Head coach: Gary Pinkel	Head coach: Reggie Herring (interim)
AP / Coaches / BCS; 7 / 7 / 6	AP / Coaches / BCS; 25 / 24 / 25
	1	2	3	4	Total
Missouri	7	7	14	10	38
Arkansas	0	0	7	0	7
- Date: January 1, 2008
- Season: 2007
- Stadium: Cotton Bowl
- Location: Dallas, Texas
- MVP: RB Tony Temple (Missouri); SS William Moore (Missouri)
- Favorite: Missouri by 3½
- Referee: Ron Cherry (ACC)
- Attendance: 73,114
- Payout: US$3,000,000 per team

United States TV coverage
- Network: FOX
- Announcers: Pat Summerall, Brian Baldinger, and Krista Voda

The 2008 AT&T Cotton Bowl Classic was a college football bowl game played on January 1, 2008, at the Cotton Bowl in Dallas, Texas, USA. The Cotton Bowl Classic was part of the 2007 NCAA Division I FBS football season and one of 32 games in the 2007–08 bowl season. The bowl game featured the Arkansas Razorbacks from the SEC and the Missouri Tigers from the Big 12 and was televised in the United States on FOX. Senior RB Tony Temple of Mizzou set a single game rushing record for the Cotton Bowl Classic with 281 yards and 4 touchdowns. His 281 rushing yards put him in second place all time for total rushing yards in a bowl game.

== Game invitation ==
The Arkansas Razorbacks and the Missouri Tigers accepted the Cotton Bowl Classic's invitation to play in the bowl game on January 1. This was the Arkansas Razorbacks' 11th appearance in the Cotton Bowl Classic (with a record of 3–6–1 in previous Cotton Bowl Classics) and the second appearance for the Missouri Tigers (0–1). Many Missouri fans felt insulted that the Tigers had been sent to the Cotton Bowl Classic instead of a BCS bowl after a stunning season that included a spot atop the AP College Football Rankings and a co-championship in the Big XII North. This feeling was amplified by the fact that the Kansas Jayhawks, Missouri's historical and then-conference rival, had been invited to the BCS Orange Bowl after being beaten by the Tigers at the annual Arrowhead Stadium Border Showdown in Kansas City, Missouri.

== Pre-game buildup ==
- The 72nd Cotton Bowl Classic featured two Heisman Trophy candidates, Darren McFadden (playing for Arkansas) and Chase Daniel (playing for Missouri). McFadden finished second in the voting, while Daniel was fourth.
- Reggie Herring was the head coach at Arkansas for this game. The defensive coordinator was the bridge between the departing Houston Nutt (who next coached at Ole Miss) and the arriving Bobby Petrino (who resigned from the Atlanta Falcons of the NFL).
- This was the first of two sideline reporting assignments for Fox Sports' Jeanne Zelasko. She also has a reporting assignment at the Orange Bowl, then she will leave the network to undergo treatments for thyroid cancer.

== Game summary ==
Scoring summary

Quarter	Time	Drive			Team	Scoring information	Score	
Quarter	Time	Plays	Yards	TOP	Team	Scoring information	MIZZ	ARK
1	02:29		73	1:53	MIZZ	Tony Temple 22-yard touchdown run, Jeff Wolfert kick good	7	0
2	04:34		82	2:13	MIZZ	Tony Temple 4-yard touchdown run, Jeff Wolfert kick good	14	0
3	13:38		49	1:20	MIZZ	Tony Temple 4-yard touchdown run, Jeff Wolfert kick good	21	0
3	07:37		26	0:00	MIZZ	Interception returned 26 yards for touchdown by William Moore, Jeff Wolfert kick good	28	0
3	03:08		71	4:24	ARK	Darren McFadden 3-yard touchdown run, Alex Tejada kick good	28	7
4	10:25		-3	0:39	MIZZ	32-yard field goal by Jeff Wolfert	31	7
4	08:33		40	0:10	MIZZ	Tony Temple 40-yard touchdown run, Jeff Wolfert kick good	38	7
"TOP" = time of possession. For other American football terms, see Glossary of American football.							38	7

== See also ==
- Battle Line Rivalry
