= 2007 Baylor Bears football team =

American college football season

2007 Baylor Bears football
- Conference: Big 12 Conference
- South Division
- Record: 3–9 (0–8 Big 12)
- Head coach: Guy Morriss (5th season)
- Offensive coordinator: Lee Hays (2nd season)
- Offensive scheme: Spread
- Defensive coordinator: Larry Hoefer (1st season)
- Base defense: 4–2–5
- Home stadium: Floyd Casey Stadium

2007 Big 12 Conference football standings
	Conf.			Overall
Team	W		L	W		L
North Division
No. 4 Missouri xy	7	–	1	12	–	2
No. 7 Kansas x%	7	–	1	12	–	1
Colorado	4	–	4	6	–	7
Kansas State	3	–	5	5	–	7
Nebraska	2	–	6	5	–	7
Iowa State	2	–	6	3	–	9
South Division
No. 8 Oklahoma xy$	6	–	2	11	–	3
No. 10 Texas	5	–	3	10	–	3
No. 22 Texas Tech	4	–	4	9	–	4
Oklahoma State	4	–	4	7	–	6
Texas A&M	4	–	4	7	–	6
Baylor	0	–	8	3	–	9
Championship: Oklahoma 38, Missouri 17
$ – BCS representative as conference champion; % – BCS at-large representative; x – Division champion/co-champions; y – Championship game participant; Rankings from AP Poll

The 2007 Baylor Bears football team (variously "Baylor", "BU", or the "Bears") represented Baylor University during the 2007 NCAA Division I FBS football season. They played their home games at Floyd Casey Stadium in Waco, Texas.

The team was led by head fifth-year coach Guy Morriss, who was fired on November 18, 2007, the day after the season ended. Houston head coach Art Briles was hired as Morriss' replacement on November 28, 2007.

== Schedule ==
Date	Time	Opponent	Site	TV	Result	Attendance	Source
September 1	5:00 p.m.	at No. 22 TCU*	Amon G. Carter Stadium; Fort Worth, TX (rivalry)	CSTV	L 0–27	35,606	
September 8	6:00 p.m.	Rice*	Floyd Casey Stadium; Waco, TX (rivalry)		W 42–17	29,107	
September 15	6:00 p.m.	Texas State*	Floyd Casey Stadium; Waco, TX		W 34–27	36,274	
September 22	5:00 p.m.	at Buffalo*	University at Buffalo Stadium; Amherst, NY		W 34–21	22,676	
September 29	11:30 a.m.	at Texas A&M	Kyle Field; College Station, TX (Battle of the Brazos)	Versus	L 10–34	82,970	
October 6	6:00 p.m.	Colorado	Floyd Casey Stadium; Waco, TX		L 23–43	32,376	
October 13	12:15 p.m.	at No. 20 Kansas	Memorial Stadium; Lawrence, KS	FCS	L 10–58	45,356	
October 20	11:30 a.m.	No. 19 Texas	Floyd Casey Stadium; Waco, TX (rivalry)	Versus	L 10–31	41,355	
October 27	2:35 p.m.	at Kansas State	Bill Snyder Family Football Stadium; Manhattan, KS		L 13–51	45,959	
November 3	2:00 p.m.	Texas Tech^{†}	Floyd Casey Stadium; Waco, TX (rivalry)		L 7–38	39,015	
November 10	5:30 p.m.	at No. 4 Oklahoma	Gaylord Family Oklahoma Memorial Stadium; Norman, OK	FSN	L 21–52	84,450	
November 17	6:00 p.m.	Oklahoma State	Floyd Casey Stadium; Waco, TX	FSN	L 14–45	28,159	
*Non-conference game; ^{†}Homecoming; Rankings from AP Poll released prior to the game; All times are in Central time

== Game summaries ==
=== At No. 22 TCU ===
	1	2	3	4	Total
Bears	0	0	0	0	0
No. 22 Horned Frogs	0	14	0	13	27

=== Rice ===
	1	2	3	4	Total
Owls	7	0	7	3	17
Bears	21	7	14	0	42

=== Texas State ===
	1	2	3	4	Total
Bobcats	0	14	3	10	27
Bears	14	7	0	13	34

=== At Buffalo ===
	1	2	3	4	Total
Bears	3	7	17	7	34
Bulls	0	7	0	14	21

=== At Texas A&M ===
	1	2	3	4	Total
Bears	3	0	0	7	10
Aggies	3	7	10	14	34

=== Colorado ===
	1	2	3	4	Total
Buffaloes	10	20	10	3	43
Bears	0	9	7	7	23

=== At No. 20 Kansas ===
	1	2	3	4	Total
Bears	3	0	7	0	10
No. 20 Jayhawks	10	21	10	17	58

=== No. 19 Texas ===
	1	2	3	4	Total
No. 19 Longhorns	3	7	7	14	31
Bears	0	7	0	3	10

=== At Kansas State ===
	1	2	3	4	Total
Bears	0	6	0	7	13
Wildcats	10	6	21	14	51

=== Texas Tech ===
	1	2	3	4	Total
Red Raiders	14	3	21	0	38
Bears	0	0	0	7	7

=== At No. 4 Oklahoma ===
	1	2	3	4	Total
Bears	7	7	7	0	21
No. 4 Sooners	14	14	14	10	52

=== Oklahoma State ===
	1	2	3	4	Total
Cowboys	7	21	10	7	45
Bears	0	14	0	0	14
