= 2007 Iowa State Cyclones football team =

American college football season

2007 Iowa State Cyclones football
- Conference: Big 12 Conference
- North Division
- Record: 3–9 (2–6 Big 12)
- Head coach: Gene Chizik (1st season)
- Offensive coordinator: Robert McFarland (1st season)
- Offensive scheme: Multiple
- Defensive coordinator: Wayne Bolt (1st season)
- Base defense: 4–3
- Home stadium: Jack Trice Stadium

2007 Big 12 Conference football standings
	Conf.			Overall
Team	W		L	W		L
North Division
No. 4 Missouri xy	7	–	1	12	–	2
No. 7 Kansas x%	7	–	1	12	–	1
Colorado	4	–	4	6	–	7
Kansas State	3	–	5	5	–	7
Nebraska	2	–	6	5	–	7
Iowa State	2	–	6	3	–	9
South Division
No. 8 Oklahoma xy$	6	–	2	11	–	3
No. 10 Texas	5	–	3	10	–	3
No. 22 Texas Tech	4	–	4	9	–	4
Oklahoma State	4	–	4	7	–	6
Texas A&M	4	–	4	7	–	6
Baylor	0	–	8	3	–	9
Championship: Oklahoma 38, Missouri 17
$ – BCS representative as conference champion; % – BCS at-large representative; x – Division champion/co-champions; y – Championship game participant; Rankings from AP Poll

The 2007 Iowa State Cyclones football team represented Iowa State University as a member of the North Division in the Big 12 Conference during the 2007 NCAA Division I FBS football season. Led by first-year head coach Gene Chizik, the Cyclones compiled an overall record of 3–9 with a mark of 2–6 in conference play, tying for fifth place at the bottom of the standings in the Big 12's North Division. The team played home games at Jack Trice Stadium in Ames, Iowa.

== Schedule ==
Date	Time	Opponent	Site	TV	Result	Attendance
August 30	7:00 p.m.	Kent State*	Jack Trice Stadium; Ames, IA	CloneZone (webcast)	L 14–23	47,313
September 8	6:00 p.m.	No. 7 (FCS) Northern Iowa*	Jack Trice Stadium; Ames, IA		L 13–24	56,795
September 15	12:30 p.m.	Iowa*	Jack Trice Stadium; Ames, IA (rivalry)	Versus	W 15–13	49,516
September 22	6:00 p.m.	at Toledo*	Glass Bowl; Toledo, OH	CloneZone	L 35–36	15,219
September 29	1:00 p.m.	at No. 22 Nebraska	Memorial Stadium; Lincoln, NE (rivalry)		L 17–35	84,703
October 6	6:00 p.m.	at Texas Tech	Jones AT&T Stadium; Lubbock, TX	FCS Central	L 17–42	46,558
October 13	11:30 a.m.	No. 23 Texas	Jack Trice Stadium; Ames, IA	FSN	L 3–56	52,060
October 20	11:30 a.m.	No. 4 Oklahoma^{†}	Jack Trice Stadium; Ames, IA	FSN	L 7–17	49,511
October 27	1:00 p.m.	at No. 13 Missouri	Faurot Field; Columbia, MO (rivalry)		L 28–42	53,386
November 3	11:30 a.m.	Kansas State	Jack Trice Stadium; Ames, IA (rivalry)	Versus	W 31–20	45,551
November 10	11:30 a.m.	Colorado	Jack Trice Stadium; Ames, IA	FCS	W 31–28	45,487
November 17	2:30 p.m.	at No. 4 Kansas	Memorial Stadium; Lawrence, KS	ABC	L 7–45	51,050
*Non-conference game; ^{†}Homecoming; Rankings from AP Poll released prior to the game; All times are in Central time
