= Missouri–Oklahoma football rivalry =

American college football rivalry

- Missouri Tigers Oklahoma Sooners
- First meeting: November 12, 1902; Missouri, 22–5
- Latest meeting: November 22, 2025; Oklahoma, 17–6
- Next meeting: November 28, 2026
- Trophy: Tiger–Sooner Peace Pipe

Statistics
- Total meetings: 98
- All-time series: Oklahoma leads, 68–25–5 (.719)
- Largest victory: Oklahoma, 77–0 (1986)
- Longest win streak: Oklahoma, 14 (1946–1959)
- Current win streak: Oklahoma, 1

Locations of Missouri and Oklahoma

The Missouri–Oklahoma football rivalry is an American college football rivalry between the Missouri Tigers football team of the University of Missouri and Oklahoma Sooners football team of the University of Oklahoma in the Southeastern Conference (SEC). The Tiger–Sooner Peace Pipe was the trophy awarded to the winner of the game.

Like many rivalry games, the game is played during the final week of the college football season.

== Series history ==
Missouri and Oklahoma's football teams first played in 1902, and played annually from 1910 to 1995, with only a one-year interruption in 1918 during World War I. The Tiger-Sooner Peace Pipe had been awarded from 1929 to 1974, but was lost sometime after the 1974 matchup. The Big 12 Conference was formed in 1994, and was split into two divisions. The two universities being placed in different division (Missouri in the Big 12 North Division, Oklahoma in the South Division) prevented an annual matchup. After the formation of the Big 12, the teams played a home-and-home series with two years in between each series (1998–99, 2002–03, 2006–07, 2010–11).

The Sooners won the last meeting 38–28 on September 24, 2011. With Missouri's withdrawal from the Big 12 and admission to the SEC effective July 1, 2012, the future of the rivalry became uncertain. On July 30, 2021, however, Oklahoma and Texas asked for and received an invitation to join the Southeastern Conference, effective July 1, 2025, reigniting the rivalry. Later, on February 9, 2023, it was reported that Oklahoma would join a year earlier in 2024. Since Oklahoma joined, they are Missouri's most played conference rival. Missouri is Oklahoma's second most behind Texas. The teams' first meeting as SEC members and first since 2011 was on November 9, 2024, in Columbia. In 2026, it was announced that Oklahoma and Missouri would now be a protected rivalry week matchup, occurring every year to end the season.

== Tiger–Sooner Peace Pipe ==
In November 1940, a genuine Indian peace pipe was donated by Dr. John S. Knight of Kansas City to become the traveling trophy of the rivalry. Dr. Knight was a 1923 graduate of the University of Missouri. The peace pipe, in the form of a tomahawk, belonged to Chief White Eagle of the Pawnee tribe. The peace pipe was believed to be over 100 years old at the time it was donated in 1940. An inscription on the peace pipe reads "Mystical Seven Society Ceremonial Tomahawk Pipe, University of Missouri vs. University of Oklahoma, Dr. John S. Knight –; donor of peace pipe." Winners of each game are also inscribed on the pipe. The peace pipe was entrusted to MU's Mystical Seven and OU's Pe-Et, who would share the peace pipe in the end zone at halftime to celebrate the two universities. The society of the winning university would return the peace pipe to its university until the next meeting of the two teams.

The Sooners were the first to take possession of the peace pipe following their 7–0 victory over the Tigers in 1940. "Oklahoma" was inscribed 19 times on the pipe from 1940 to 1963. After a tie in 1964, OU gave possession of the pipe to MU as Oklahoma had held the trophy so many more times since the trophy's inception. Records indicate that the tradition continued through 1974, but the peace pipe exchange did not take place in 1975. The current location of the pipe is unknown since it was last held by Oklahoma. OU's senior associate athletic director, Kenny Mossman, has indicated that Oklahoma officials have conducted an extensive search of their archives for historical items, and the peace pipe has not been located.

== Notable games ==
=== 2007 Big 12 Championship Game ===
The Tigers were the Big 12 North's representative in the 2007 Big 12 Championship Game, where they faced Big 12 South representative Oklahoma in a rematch of a regular season game won by the Sooners. Missouri came into the game ranked #1 in the AP Poll and BCS rankings, while Oklahoma was ranked #9. Nevertheless, Oklahoma was favored by bookmakers and won, 38–17.

=== 2008 Big 12 Championship Game ===
The 2008 Big 12 Championship Game was a rematch of the 2007 Big 12 Championship Game. This time, Oklahoma was favored and won handily, 62–21.

=== October 23, 2010 ===
In their 2010 meeting, Mizzou defeated Oklahoma (then ranked #1 in the BCS rankings). The game was the site of ESPN's College GameDay, where Missouri set the on-campus attendance record for GameDay. Tigers fans tore down the goalposts after this victory.

=== November 9th, 2024 ===
In their first meeting since either team left the Big 12 Conference for the Southeastern Conference, Mizzou defeated Oklahoma by scoring 14 points in the last 65 seconds of game time, the final 7 points being scored on a late scoop and score fumble return for a touchdown. It was Missouri's first win over the Sooners since 2010.

== Game results ==
Missouri victories	Oklahoma victories	Tie games

No.	Date	Location	Winning team		Losing team	
1	November 12, 1902	Columbia, MO	Missouri	22	Oklahoma	5
2	October 28, 1910	Joplin, MO	Missouri	26	Oklahoma	0
3	November 4, 1911	Columbia, MO	Oklahoma	14	Missouri	6
4	October 25, 1912	Norman, OK	Missouri	14	Oklahoma	0
5	October 18, 1913	Columbia, MO	Missouri	20	Oklahoma	17
6	October 17, 1914	Norman, OK	Oklahoma	13	Missouri	0
7	October 16, 1915	Columbia, MO	Oklahoma	24	Missouri	0
8	October 28, 1916	Norman, OK	Missouri	23	Oklahoma	14
9	November 3, 1917	Columbia, MO	Oklahoma	14	Missouri	7
10	November 1, 1919	Norman, OK	Tie	6	Tie	6
11	October 30, 1920	Columbia, MO	Oklahoma	28	Missouri	7
12	November 12, 1921	Columbia, MO	Missouri	24	Oklahoma	14
13	November 11, 1922	Norman, OK	Oklahoma	18	Missouri	14
14	November 10, 1923	Columbia, MO	Oklahoma	13	Missouri	0
15	November 8, 1924	Norman, OK	Missouri	10	Oklahoma	0
16	November 14, 1925	Columbia, MO	Missouri	16	Oklahoma	14
17	November 6, 1926	Norman, OK	Oklahoma	10	Missouri	7
18	November 24, 1927	Columbia, MO	Missouri	20	Oklahoma	7
19	November 29, 1928	Norman, OK	Oklahoma	14	Missouri	0
20	November 28, 1929	Columbia, MO	Missouri	13	Oklahoma	0
21	November 27, 1930	Norman, OK	Tie	0	Tie	0
22	November 14, 1931	Columbia, MO	Missouri	7	Oklahoma	0
23	November 5, 1932	Norman, OK	Missouri	14	Oklahoma	6
24	November 11, 1933	Columbia, MO	Oklahoma	21	Missouri	0
25	November 3, 1934	Norman, OK	Oklahoma	31	Missouri	0
26	November 9, 1935	Columbia, MO	Oklahoma	20	Missouri	6
27	November 14, 1936	Norman, OK	Missouri	21	Oklahoma	14
28	November 13, 1937	Columbia, MO	Oklahoma	7	Missouri	0
29	November 12, 1938	Norman, OK	#10 Oklahoma	21	Missouri	0
30	November 18, 1939	Columbia, MO	#12 Missouri	7	#5 Oklahoma	6
31	November 16, 1940	Norman, OK	Oklahoma	7	Missouri	0
32	November 15, 1941	Columbia, MO	#16 Missouri	28	Oklahoma	0
33	November 14, 1942	Norman, OK	Tie	6	Tie	6
34	November 13, 1943	Columbia, MO	Oklahoma	20	Missouri	13
35	November 11, 1944	Norman, OK	Tie	21	Tie	21
36	November 17, 1945	Columbia, MO	Missouri	14	#14 Oklahoma	6
37	November 16, 1946	Norman, OK	Oklahoma	27	Missouri	6
38	November 15, 1947	Columbia, MO	Oklahoma	21	#17 Missouri	12
39	November 6, 1948	Norman, OK	#15 Oklahoma	41	#9 Missouri	7
40	November 12, 1949	Columbia, MO	#3 Oklahoma	27	Missouri	7
41	November 18, 1950	Norman, OK	#2 Oklahoma	41	Missouri	7
42	November 10, 1951	Columbia, MO	#14 Oklahoma	34	Missouri	20
43	November 15, 1952	Norman, OK	#8 Oklahoma	47	Missouri	7
44	November 7, 1953	Columbia, MO	#8 Oklahoma	14	Missouri	7
45	November 13, 1954	Norman, OK	#3 Oklahoma	34	Missouri	13
46	November 5, 1955	Columbia, MO	#2 Oklahoma	20	Missouri	0
47	November 17, 1956	Norman, OK	#2 Oklahoma	67	Missouri	14
48	November 9, 1957	Columbia, MO	#2 Oklahoma	39	#19 Missouri	14
49	November 15, 1958	Norman, OK	#6 Oklahoma	39	Missouri	0
50	October 17, 1959	Columbia, MO	Oklahoma	23	Missouri	0

No.	Date	Location	Winning team		Losing team	
51	November 12, 1960	Norman, OK	#2 Missouri	41	Oklahoma	19
52	November 11, 1961	Columbia, MO	Oklahoma	7	#10 Missouri	0
53	November 17, 1962	Norman, OK	Oklahoma	13	#6 Missouri	0
54	November 16, 1963	Columbia, MO	#5 Oklahoma	13	Missouri	3
55	November 14, 1964	Norman, OK	Tie	14	Tie	14
56	November 13, 1965	Columbia, MO	#9 Missouri	34	Oklahoma	0
57	November 12, 1966	Norman, OK	Missouri	10	Oklahoma	7
58	October 28, 1967	Columbia, MO	Oklahoma	7	Missouri	0
59	November 16, 1968	Norman, OK	Oklahoma	28	#6 Missouri	14
60	November 8, 1969	Columbia, MO	#9 Missouri	44	#20 Oklahoma	10
61	November 7, 1970	Norman, OK	Oklahoma	28	Missouri	13
62	November 6, 1971	Columbia, MO	#2 Oklahoma	20	Missouri	3
63	November 11, 1972	Norman, OK	#7 Oklahoma	17	#14 Missouri	6
64	November 10, 1973	Columbia, MO	#3 Oklahoma	31	#10 Missouri	3
65	November 9, 1974	Norman, OK	#2 Oklahoma	37	Missouri	0
66	November 15, 1975	Columbia, MO	#6 Oklahoma	28	#18 Missouri	27
67	November 13, 1976	Norman, OK	#14 Oklahoma	27	#11 Missouri	20
68	October 15, 1977	Columbia, MO	#7 Oklahoma	21	Missouri	17
69	September 30, 1978	Norman, OK	#1 Oklahoma	45	#14 Missouri	23
70	November 17, 1979	Columbia, MO	#7 Oklahoma	24	Missouri	22
71	November 15, 1980	Norman, OK	#10 Oklahoma	17	Missouri	7
72	November 14, 1981	Columbia, MO	Missouri	19	#15 Oklahoma	14
73	November 13, 1982	Norman, OK	#15 Oklahoma	41	Missouri	14
74	November 5, 1983	Columbia, MO	Missouri	10	#11 Oklahoma	0
75	November 3, 1984	Norman, OK	#10 Oklahoma	49	Missouri	7
76	November 9, 1985	Columbia, MO	#7 Oklahoma	51	Missouri	6
77	November 8, 1986	Norman, OK	#4 Oklahoma	77	Missouri	0
78	November 14, 1987	Norman, OK	#1 Oklahoma	17	Missouri	13
79	November 12, 1988	Columbia, MO	#8 Oklahoma	16	Missouri	7
80	November 4, 1989	Norman, OK	Oklahoma	52	Missouri	14
81	November 3, 1990	Columbia, MO	Oklahoma	55	Missouri	10
82	November 9, 1991	Columbia, MO	#20 Oklahoma	56	Missouri	16
83	November 7, 1992	Norman, OK	Oklahoma	51	Missouri	17
84	November 6, 1993	Columbia, MO	#20 Oklahoma	42	Missouri	23
85	November 5, 1994	Norman, OK	Oklahoma	30	Missouri	13
86	October 28, 1995	Columbia, MO	#23 Oklahoma	13	Missouri	9
87	October 17, 1998	Columbia, MO	#20 Missouri	20	Oklahoma	6
88	November 6, 1999	Norman, OK	Oklahoma	37	Missouri	0
89	October 5, 2002	Columbia, MO	#3 Oklahoma	31	Missouri	24
90	October 18, 2003	Norman, OK	#1 Oklahoma	34	#24 Missouri	13
91	October 28, 2006	Columbia, MO	#19 Oklahoma	26	#23 Missouri	10
92	October 13, 2007	Norman, OK	#6 Oklahoma	41	#11 Missouri	31
93	December 1, 2007	San Antonio, TX	#9 Oklahoma	38	#1 Missouri	17
94	December 6, 2008	Kansas City, MO	#4 Oklahoma	62	#19 Missouri	21
95	October 23, 2010	Columbia, MO	#18 Missouri	36	#3 Oklahoma	27
96	September 24, 2011	Norman, OK	#1 Oklahoma	38	Missouri	28
97	November 9, 2024	Columbia, MO	#24 Missouri	30	Oklahoma	23
98	November 22, 2025	Norman, OK	#8 Oklahoma	17	#22 Missouri	6
Series: Oklahoma leads 68–25–5

== See also ==
- List of NCAA college football rivalry games
