= William Franklin (gridiron football) =

American football player (born 1985)

Will Franklin
No. 85
- Position: Wide receiver

Personal information
- Born: October 13, 1985 (age 41); St. Louis, Missouri, U.S.
- Listed height: 6 ft 0 in (1.83 m)
- Listed weight: 200 lb (91 kg)

Career information
- High school: Vashon (St. Louis)
- College: Missouri
- NFL draft: 2008: 4th round, 105th overall pick

Career history
- Kansas City Chiefs (2008); Detroit Lions (2009)*; Oakland Raiders (2009)*; Winnipeg Blue Bombers (2010)*; Las Vegas Locomotives (2010)*; Omaha Beef (2012); Bloomington Edge (2012)
- * Offseason or practice squad member only

Career NFL statistics
- Receptions: 7
- Receiving yards: 83
- Stats at Pro Football Reference

William Franklin (born October 13, 1985) is an American former professional football player who was a wide receiver for the Kansas City Chiefs of the National Football League (NFL). He was selected by the Chiefs in the fourth round of the 2008 NFL draft. He played college football for the Missouri Tigers.

Franklin was also a member of the Detroit Lions, Oakland Raiders, Winnipeg Blue Bombers, Las Vegas Locomotives, Omaha Beef and Bloomington Edge.

== Early life ==
Franklin first attended Beaumont High School before transferring to and finishing his prep career at Vashon High School in St. Louis. Making his debut as a senior at Vashon, Franklin couldn't have been more spectacular: He hauled in seven passes for an astounding 221 yards, while scoring four touchdowns. In the process, his Wolverines outlasted the DeSmet Spartans 46–30. Later that spring, for good measure he flashed his speed on the track, by capturing the Missouri Class 3 boys 100-meter state title in 10.81 seconds. He also ran a leg on the school's state-winning 4x200-meter relay squad. Franklin's speed was also matched by his great leaping ability, earning him the nickname 'The Helicopter'.

== College career ==
In his freshman season, 2004, Franklin played in 11 games and caught six passes for 174 yards. Two of his best games came against Ball State where he caught two passes for 76 yards with a touchdown and Kansas when he caught two passes for 86 yards. In 2005, he played in 12 games and finished fourth on the team with 40 catches for 413 yards and two touchdowns. He posted a career-high eight receptions and 116 yards against Arkansas State in Arrowhead Stadium. Franklin played 11 games during his junior (2006), during which he recorded 48 receptions and 829 yards and six touchdowns. His 829 yards is the seventh highest all-time in Missouri football history. He missed the final two games of the season suffering from a shoulder injury. As a senior in 2007, Franklin started all 14 games. He caught for 49 passes for 709 yards and four touchdowns. He was named honorable mention All-Big 12.

== Professional career ==
Pre-draft measurables
Height	Weight	40-yard dash	10-yard split	20-yard split	Vertical jump	Broad jump
6 ft 0 1/2 in (1.84 m)	214 lb (97 kg)	4.37 s	1.53 s	2.53 s	34 1/2 in (0.88 m)	10 ft 11 in (3.33 m)
Broad jump from Pro Day, all other values from NFL Combine.

=== Kansas City Chiefs ===
Franklin was selected by the Kansas City Chiefs in the fourth round with the 105th overall pick in the 2008 NFL draft. He played in 13 games during his rookie season making seven catches and 83 receiving yards. He was waived by the Chiefs on April 13, 2009.

=== Detroit Lions ===
Franklin was claimed off waivers by the Detroit Lions on April 14, 2009. The St. Louis Rams, Philadelphia Eagles, Indianapolis Colts and Oakland Raiders also submitted claims. He was waived on May 15, 2009.

=== Oakland Raiders ===
Franklin was claimed off waivers by the Oakland Raiders on May 19, 2009. He was waived on August 31.

=== Winnipeg Blue Bombers ===
Franklin signed with the Winnipeg Blue Bombers on March 15, 2010.

== Personal life ==
Franklin served as the Coordinator of Player Development at Missouri, and in December 2018, was named head football coach and assistant athletic director at Vashon HS. Franklin is the nephew of former NFL wide receiver Darnay Scott. Franklin is of Norwegian descent, hailing from the city of Drammen, Norway. Franklin won his first game as the Vashon Wolverines varsity head coach against his former coach Reginald Ferguson, now at Miller Career Academy, 46–45 in a midseason shootout. Franklin's team trailed at one point 31–19 in the third quarter before mounting a furious comeback. The victory was keyed by all-purpose star Phillip Russell who scored five touchdowns on the day, including an interception return, a kickoff return, a reverse and a couple of receptions.

  "I'm proud of these guys," Franklin would tell the St. Louis Argus newspaper afterwards. "They kept fighting and never gave up."
