= Tony Temple =

American football player (born 1985)

Profile
- Position: Running back

Personal information
- Born: September 13, 1985 (age 41); Kansas City, Missouri, U.S.
- Listed height: 5 ft 8 in (1.73 m)
- Listed weight: 195 lb (88 kg)

Career information
- High school: Rockhurst High School, Kansas City, Missouri
- College: Missouri (2004–2007)
- NFL draft: 2008: undrafted

Career history
- Cleveland Browns (2008)*
- * Offseason or practice squad member only

Awards and highlights
- 2008 Cotton Bowl Classic MVP

Tony Temple (born September 13, 1985) is a former starting running back for the Missouri Tigers football team representing the University of Missouri. Temple played for the Tigers from 2004 to 2007. He entered the 2008 NFL draft, but was not chosen and was signed after the draft as a free agent with the Cleveland Browns.

== Early life ==
Temple attended Rockhurst High School in Kansas City, Missouri, and participated in both track and field and football for the Hawklets. Temple was on two Missouri 6A High School undefeated state championship football teams in 2000 and 2002. Temple finished his high school career in football with 6,295 rushing yards and 85 total touchdowns, good for a #8 ranking by Rivals and #2 by ESPN as a running back prospect in the 2004 collegiate recruiting class.

== College career ==
In his final collegiate game, Temple set a Cotton Bowl Classic record with 281 yards rushing in Missouri's 38–7 win over Arkansas on New Year's Day 2008, breaking a mark that Dicky Maegle first set with a memorable performance in 1954. On his final carry of the game, Temple broke loose for a spinning, tackle-breaking 40-yard touchdown run and then rode to the bench on the arms of teammates Chase Daniel and lineman Tyler Luellen because he had tweaked a hamstring injury. Temple's rushing mark (281 yards) and total touchdowns (4) remain Cotton Bowl Classic records; his rushing total was also the second most rushing yards in a bowl game in college football history at the time, but is now the third most.

After the 2007 season Temple applied to get the 2008 year of eligibility back by appeal to the NCAA. Temple played in one game for 2004 as a true freshman, but due to an injury, he missed the remainder of the year. The appeal was turned down initially by the Big 12, and before the NCAA could review it, Temple decided to withdraw the appeal and prepare for the NFL draft.

== Post-college ==
Temple was signed with the Cleveland Browns, and released after a short stint in the NFL.
