= Gary Pinkel =

American football player and coach (born 1952)

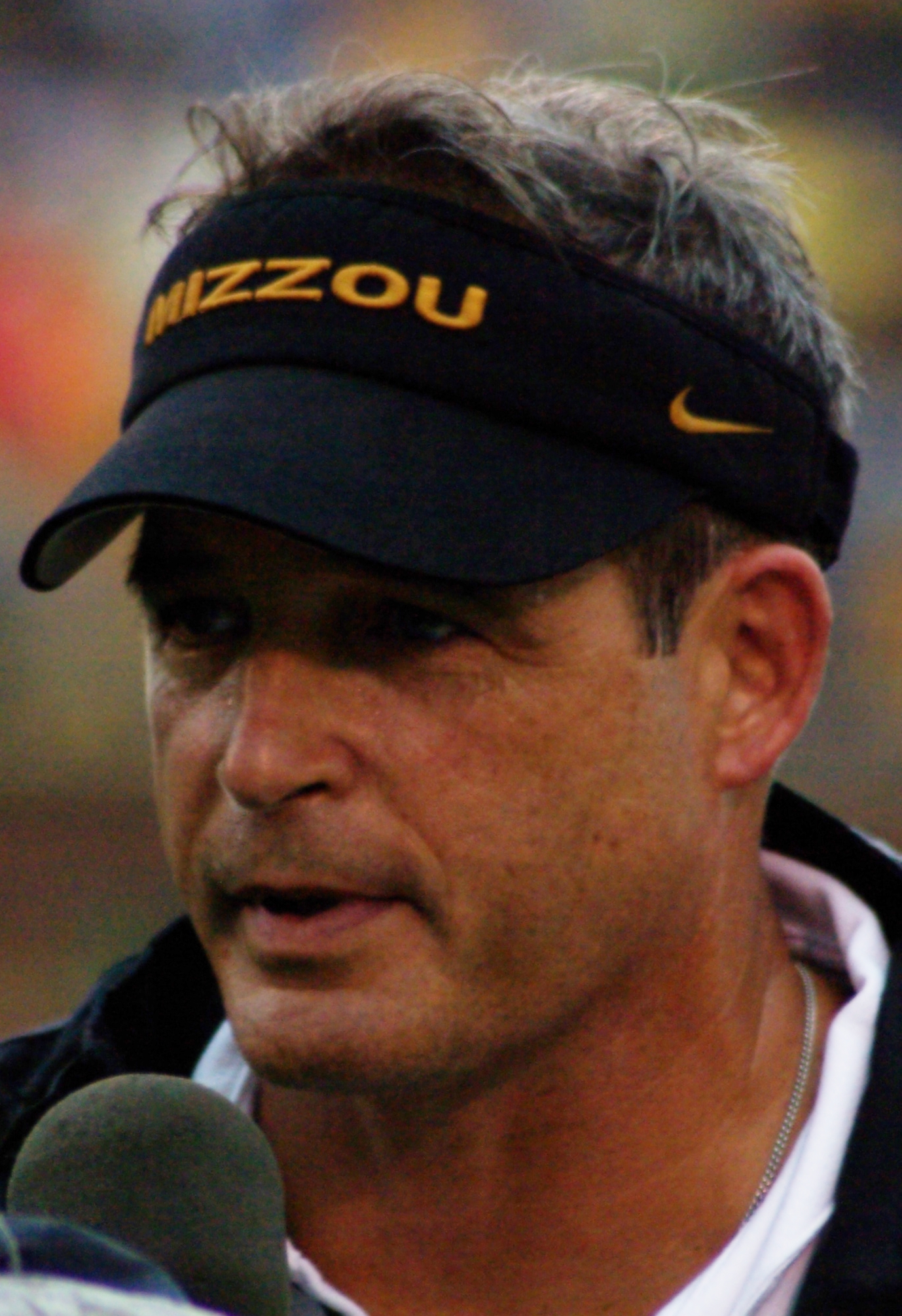

Biographical details
- Born: April 27, 1952 (age 74); Akron, Ohio, U.S.

Playing career
- 1970–1973: Kent State
- Position: Tight end

Coaching career (HC unless noted)
- 1974–1975: Kent State (GA)
- 1976: Washington (TE)
- 1977–1978: Bowling Green (WR)
- 1979–1983: Washington (WR)
- 1984–1990: Washington (OC/WR)
- 1991–2000: Toledo
- 2001–2015: Missouri

Head coaching record
- Overall: 191–110–3
- Bowls: 7–4

Accomplishments and honors

Championships
- 1 MAC (1995); 3 MAC West Division (1997–1998, 2000); 3 Big 12 North Division (2007–2008, 2010); 2 SEC East Division (2013–2014)

Awards
- 2× MAC Coach of the Year (1995, 1997); Kent Athletic Hall of Fame (1997); SEC Coach of the Year (2014)
- College Football Hall of Fame; Inducted in 2022 (profile)

Gary Robin Pinkel (born April 27, 1952) is an American former college football coach. He served as the head football coach at the University of Toledo from 1991 to 2000 and the University of Missouri from 2001 to 2015, compiling career record of 191–110–3. Pinkel has the second most wins of any head coach in the history of the Toledo Rockets football program and led the 1995 team to a Mid-American Conference championship. He also holds the record for most wins by a head coach of the Missouri Tigers football program.

Before becoming a head coach, Pinkel served as an assistant at the University of Washington, under Don James, from 1979 through 1990, the last six of those years as an offensive coordinator. Pinkel was inducted into the College Football Hall of Fame in 2022.

== Early life ==
Born in Akron, Ohio, Pinkel graduated from Kenmore High School and attended Kent State University, where he played tight end for the Golden Flashes under head coach Don James. Pinkel received his bachelor's degree in education in 1973 and began his coaching career as a graduate at Kent State under James, who left after the 1974 season for Washington. Pinkel joined him in Seattle for a season in 1976, spent two years at Bowling Green, then returned to Washington for 12 seasons.

Pinkel and Alabama head coach Nick Saban were college teammates. Pinkel took over the head coaching job at Toledo in 1991 when Saban left to become defensive coordinator for the Cleveland Browns.

His roommate at Kent State was Jack Lambert, who would have a Hall of Fame career as middle linebacker for the legendary Pittsburgh Steelers teams of the 1970s. . Pinkel did post-graduate studies at Kent State and Bowling Green State University, and was inducted into the Kent State Varsity "K" Hall of Fame in 1997.

== Head coaching career ==
=== Toledo ===
Pinkel posted a record of 73–37–3 (.659) in ten seasons at Toledo, including a 53–23–3 (.690) record in conference. His teams won three West Division titles and the conference championship in 1995.

In 1995, Pinkel's Rockets finished undefeated with an 11–0–1 record, won the Vegas Bowl and finished ranked in the top 25 of the AP poll. They were one of only three teams in the nation to finish the regular season undefeated. The others were Nebraska and Florida, who played for the national championship.

In 2000, Toledo went to Penn State and defeated Joe Paterno's Nittany Lions, 24–6. Pinkel guided Toledo to a 10–1 record that season, 6–1 in conference play.

=== Missouri ===
Arriving at Missouri after the 2000 season, Pinkel led the Tigers to ten bowl games in fifteen years, winning six. The first was in 2003, a 27–14 loss to Arkansas, and the second was a thrilling 38–31 come-from-behind win over the University of South Carolina on December 30, 2005. Missouri then lost to Oregon State, 39–38, in the Brut Sun Bowl. In 2007, a historic year for the Mizzou program, Pinkel led his team to a No. 1 AP ranking at the end of the regular season after finishing 11–1. They fell to Oklahoma in the Big 12 Championship game, and played in the Cotton Bowl Classic against Arkansas. The Tigers throttled the Razorbacks, strolling to an easy 38–7 victory and a final season ranking of No. 4 in the AP Poll.

Pinkel's other accomplishments while at Mizzou include ending the Tigers 24-year losing streak to Nebraska in 2003 with a 41–24 win in Columbia. Since this win, the two schools have had an intense rivalry, with Missouri falling short in the series only 3–4, until both schools left the conference.

In 2006, Pinkel led the Tigers to a 6–0 start, the team's first 6–0 start since 1973. However, the team finished 8–5.

During the 2007 season, Pinkel guided the Tigers to a 12–2 season with an average of 40 points per game, a Big 12 North Championship, and a 38–7 Cotton Bowl Classic victory over Arkansas. The season's most memorable moment came when Missouri defeated rival Kansas 36–28 on a nationally televised game at Arrowhead Stadium. The win propelled Missouri to the No. 1 ranking and ruined Kansas' previously unbeaten record. The only losses during the season twice came at the hands of the Oklahoma Sooners. The first loss was on the road in Norman and the second was in the Big 12 Championship. Pinkel's Tigers were tied with the Sooners at half time but ended up losing. If the Tigers had won they might have retained their then number one BCS ranking and could have played for the BCS National Championship.

In 2008, Pinkel guided his Tigers to a second consecutive Big 12 North title and a chance to have back to back double digit win seasons. Despite four tough losses, the 2008 campaign concluded with a Big 12 North Championship, the first back to back 10 win season in Missouri history and an Alamo Bowl victory against Northwestern.

On November 25, 2008, Pinkel signed a new seven-year contract that would bring him $2.3 million per year, from January 1, 2009 through December 31, 2015.

On October 23, 2010, Pinkel guided the Tigers to their first win over the Oklahoma Sooners since 1998, winning 36–27. The Sooners were ranked No. 1 in the BCS Poll at the time, leading to the third straight week that a No. 1 team lost. The Tigers finished the regular season 10-2 (6-2 Big 12), but Nebraska qualified for the Big 12 Championship due to having the tiebreaker with their prior 31–17 victory over Missouri.

The Southeastern Conference asked Missouri to join in 2011 in part so the league would not have an uneven number of teams after Texas A&M became the SEC's 13th member. The 2011 season was a letdown, marked by Missouri's record falling to 8-5 and Pinkel's arrest on DUI charges in mid-November. Pinkel's 2012 team finished 5-7 in the SEC East Division and was the first in eight seasons to not go to a bowl game; Florida president Bernard Machen later said that other members saw Pinkel as a "quality guy" but "didn't think Missouri had been that good of late". The 2013 and 2014 teams were very successful, however, winning the division in both years; "We had no idea Pinkel was gonna turn around and beat us and be that good that quick", Machen added.

During the 2015 season, the University of Missouri campus was impacted by protests. These protests made their way to the football team, who announced they would go on strike until their demands were met. Pinkel stood behind the striking players, tweeting “Mizzou Family stands as one.” and added in a later interview “They had tears in their eyes and asked if I would support them and I said I would ― it’s about supporting my players when they needed me. I did the right thing and I would do it again.”

Beginning with the 2002 NFL draft, Pinkel has had 26 players selected, including seven first-round choices since 2009.

On November 13, 2015, Pinkel announced he would retire at the end of the season. He stated that he has non-Hodgkin's lymphoma, and wants to spend his remaining years with family and friends.

Pinkel released his autobiography The 100-Yard Journey: A Life in Coaching and Battling for the Win (Triumph Books) in September 2017.

== Honors and achievements ==
Pinkel is the record holder for all-time wins at Missouri.

At Toledo, his 73 wins are the second most in program history. For his accomplishments, Pinkel was inducted into the school's athletic hall of fame in February 2009.

On January 10, 2022, it was announced that Pinkel would be inducted into the College Football Hall of Fame.

== Head coaching record ==
Year	Team	Overall	Conference	Standing	Bowl/playoffs	Coaches^{#}	AP^{°}
Toledo Rockets (Mid-American Conference) (1991–2000)
1991	Toledo	5–5–1	4–3–1	T–3rd			
1992	Toledo	8–3	5–3	T–3rd			
1993	Toledo	4–7	3–5	T–7th			
1994	Toledo	6–4–1	4–3–1	6th			
1995	Toledo	11–0–1	7–0–1	1st	W Las Vegas	24	24
1996	Toledo	7–4	6–2	T–2nd			
1997	Toledo	9–3	7–1	1st (West)			
1998	Toledo	7–5	6–2	1st (West)			
1999	Toledo	6–5	5–3	T–2nd (West)			
2000	Toledo	10–1	6–1	1st (West)			
Toledo:		73–37–3	53–23–3				
Missouri Tigers (Big 12 Conference) (2001–2011)
2001	Missouri	4–7	3–5	T–4th (North)			
2002	Missouri	5–7	2–6	5th (North)			
2003	Missouri	8–5	4–4	3rd (North)	L Independence		
2004	Missouri	5–6	3–5	T–3rd (North)			
2005	Missouri	7–5	4–4	T–2nd (North)	W Independence		
2006	Missouri	8–5	4–4	T–2nd (North)	L Sun		
2007	Missouri	12–2	7–1	T–1st (North)	W Cotton	5	4
2008	Missouri	10–4	5–3	T–1st (North)	W Alamo	16	19
2009	Missouri	8–5	4–4	T–2nd (North)	L Texas		
2010	Missouri	10–3	6–2	T–1st (North)	L Insight	18	18
2011	Missouri	8–5	5–4	5th	W Independence		
Missouri Tigers (Southeastern Conference) (2012–2015)
2012	Missouri	5–7	2–6	5th (Eastern)			
2013	Missouri	12–2	7–1	1st (Eastern)	W Cotton	5	5
2014	Missouri	11–3	7–1	1st (Eastern)	W Citrus	11	14
2015	Missouri	0*–7	0*–7	T–6th (Eastern)			
Missouri:		113*–73	63*–57				
Total:		186*–110–3					
National championship Conference title Conference division title or championship game berth
^{#}Rankings from final Coaches Poll.; ^{°}Rankings from final AP Poll.

* Missouri vacated its wins in 2015 due to NCAA action.
