= 2007 Virginia Cavaliers football team =

American college football season

2007 Virginia Cavaliers football

Gator Bowl, L 28–31 vs. Texas Tech
- Conference: Atlantic Coast Conference
- Coastal
- Record: 9–4 (6–2 ACC)
- Head coach: Al Groh (7th season)
- Offensive coordinator: Mike Groh (2nd season)
- Offensive scheme: West Coast
- Defensive coordinator: Mike London (2nd season)
- Base defense: 3–4
- Home stadium: Scott Stadium (Capacity: 61,500)

Uniform

2007 Atlantic Coast Conference football standings
	Conf.			Overall
Team	W		L	W		L
Atlantic Division
No. 10 Boston College x	6	–	2	11	–	3
No. 21 Clemson	5	–	3	9	–	4
Wake Forest	5	–	3	9	–	4
Florida State	4	–	4	7	–	6
Maryland	3	–	5	6	–	7
NC State	3	–	5	5	–	7
Coastal Division
No. 9 Virginia Tech x$	7	–	1	11	–	3
Virginia	6	–	2	9	–	4
Georgia Tech	4	–	4	7	–	6
North Carolina	3	–	5	4	–	8
Miami (FL)	2	–	6	5	–	7
Duke	0	–	8	1	–	11
Championship: Virginia Tech 30, Boston College 16
$ – BCS representative as conference champion; % – BCS at-large representative; x – Division champion/co-champions; Rankings from AP Poll

The 2007 Virginia Cavaliers football team represented the University of Virginia in the 2007 NCAA Division I FBS football season. The team's head coach was coach Al Groh. They played their home games at Scott Stadium in Charlottesville, Virginia.

== Preseason ==
The Cavaliers and coach Al Groh face a pivotal season in 2007 as they attempt to overcome their losing record in 2006. While the defense made improvements under new coordinator Mike London, the offense struggled all season. In November 2006, Groh indicated that he was not ready to "anoint" Jameel Sewell, who started the final nine games of 2006, as the unquestioned quarterback for 2007.

The Cavaliers were a young team in 2006, leading Groh to joke that the 2007 team was playing the 2006 season. While Groh had frequently played true freshman in earlier seasons, sometime for very limited action, he redshirted the entire freshman class in 2006 except for defensive lineman Nate Collins. Several players from that class are expected to be contributors in 2007, in particular running back Keith Payne has generated excitement among fans. Several talented true freshmen, such as quarterback Peter Lalich, joined the team in 2007.

== Schedule ==
Date	Time	Opponent	Rank	Site	TV	Result	Attendance
September 1	2:00 pm	at Wyoming*		War Memorial Stadium; Laramie, WY	Versus	L 3–23	31,620
September 8	12:00 pm	Duke		Scott Stadium; Charlottesville, VA	LFS	W 24–13	58,554
September 15	12:00 pm	at North Carolina		Kenan Stadium; Chapel Hill, NC (South's Oldest Rivalry)	LFS	W 22–20	58,000
September 22	12:00 pm	Georgia Tech		Scott Stadium; Charlottesville, VA	ESPNU	W 28–23	57,681
September 29	7:00 pm	Pittsburgh*		Scott Stadium; Charlottesville, VA	ESPNU	W 44–14	60,888
October 6	7:00 pm	at Middle Tennessee*		Johnny "Red" Floyd Stadium; Murfreesboro, TN	CSS	W 23–21	23,227
October 13	3:30 pm	Connecticut*^{†}		Scott Stadium; Charlottesville, VA	ESPNU	W 17–16	60,004
October 20	8:00 pm	at Maryland		Byrd Stadium; College Park, MD (rivalry)	ESPN2	W 18–17	52,782
October 27	4:30 pm	at NC State	No. 21	Carter–Finley Stadium; Raleigh, NC	ESPNU	L 24–29	55,342
November 3	12:00 pm	No. 21 Wake Forest		Scott Stadium; Charlottesville, VA	LFS	W 17–16	60,106
November 10	7:15 pm	at Miami (FL)	No. 23	Miami Orange Bowl; Miami, FL	ESPN2	W 48–0	62,106
November 24	12:00 pm	No. 8 Virginia Tech	No. 16	Scott Stadium; Charlottesville, VA (Commonwealth Cup)	ESPN2	L 21–33	61,711
January 1	1:00 pm	vs. Texas Tech*	No. 21	Jacksonville Municipal Stadium; Jacksonville, FL (Gator Bowl)	CBS	L 28–31	60,243
*Non-conference game; ^{†}Homecoming; Rankings from AP Poll released prior to the game; All times are in Eastern time

== Coaching staff ==
Position	Name	Season
Head coach:	Al Groh	7th
Defensive coordinator/defensive line coach:	Mike London	6th
Offensive coordinator/quarterbacks coach:	Mike Groh	7th
Assistant head coach/defensive backs coach:	Steve Bernstein	2nd
Special teams coordinator/linebackers coach	Bob Diaco	2nd
Defensive assistant coach/assistant defensive line coach	Lervern Belin	2nd
Wide receivers coach:	Wayne Lineburg	1st
Running game coordinator/offensive line coach	Dave Borbely	2nd
Asst. Special teams coordinator/running backs coach	Anthony Poindexter	4th
Tight ends coach/recruiting coordinator	Bob Price	10th
Graduate assistant offense	Jim Jones	1st
Graduate assistant defense	Vincent Brown	1st
Head strength coach	Matt Balis	1st
Director of football video operations	Luke Goldstein	6th

== Players ==
=== Recruiting ===
The Virginia Cavalier 2007 recruiting class consisted of 24 signed players. The class is headlined by quarterback Peter Lalich, outside linebacker J'Courtney Williams and wide receiver Dontrelle Inman. Overall, the 2007 Virginia recruiting class was ranked #25 by rivals.com and #32 by scout.com.

College recruiting (2007)
Name	Hometown	School	Height	Weight	Commit date
**Danny Aiken**; LS	Roanoke, Virginia	Cave Spring High School	6 ft 5 in (1.96 m)	230 lb (100 kg)	Jan 12, 2007
**Danny Aiken**; LS	Recruit ratings: Rivals: (40)				
**Mark Ambrose**; TE	Mount Carmel, Pennsylvania	Mount Carmel Junior-Senior High School	6 ft 6 in (1.98 m)	230 lb (100 kg)	Apr 27, 2006
**Mark Ambrose**; TE	Recruit ratings: Scout: Rivals: (40)				
**Landon Bradley**; OT	Conway, South Carolina	Conway High School	6 ft 7 in (2.01 m)	280 lb (130 kg)	Nov 1, 2006
**Landon Bradley**; OT	Recruit ratings: Scout: Rivals: (75)				
**Kris Burd**; WR	Ettrick, Virginia	Matoaca High School	6 ft 0 in (1.83 m)	175 lb (79 kg)	Sep 17, 2006
**Kris Burd**; WR	Recruit ratings: Scout: Rivals: (40)				
**Matt Conrath**; DE	Chicago, Illinois	Saint Rita High School	6 ft 7 in (2.01 m)	236 lb (107 kg)	Jan 2, 2007
**Matt Conrath**; DE	Recruit ratings: Scout: Rivals: (70)				
**Billy Cuffee**; TE	Chesapeake, Virginia	Deep Creek High School	6 ft 5 in (1.96 m)	330 lb (150 kg)	Feb 7, 2007
**Billy Cuffee**; TE	Recruit ratings: Scout: Rivals: (40)				
**Jared Detrick**; SLB	Newport News, Virginia	Woodside High School	6 ft 2 in (1.88 m)	227 lb (103 kg)	Mar 1, 2006
**Jared Detrick**; SLB	Recruit ratings: Scout: Rivals: (75)				
**Andrew Devlin**; TE	Pittsburgh, Pennsylvania	Mount Lebanon Senior High School	6 ft 6 in (1.98 m)	252 lb (114 kg)	Aug 4, 2006
**Andrew Devlin**; TE	Recruit ratings: Scout: Rivals: (78)				
**Ras-I Dowling**; WR/DB	Chesapeake, Virginia	Deep Creek High School	6 ft 2 in (1.88 m)	180 lb (82 kg)	Aug 15, 2006
**Ras-I Dowling**; WR/DB	Recruit ratings: Scout: Rivals: (40)				
**Terence Fells-Danzer**; MLB	Culpeper, Virginia	Culpeper County High School	6 ft 1 in (1.85 m)	228 lb (103 kg)	May 23, 2006
**Terence Fells-Danzer**; MLB	Recruit ratings: Scout: Rivals: (40)				
**Jared Green**; WR	Vienna, Virginia	Oakton High School	6 ft 2 in (1.88 m)	172 lb (78 kg)	Feb 7, 2007
**Jared Green**; WR	Recruit ratings: Scout: Rivals: (40)				
**Chris Hinkebein**; K	Charlotte, North Carolina	Providence High School	6 ft 2 in (1.88 m)	185 lb (84 kg)	Sep 21, 2006
**Chris Hinkebein**; K	Recruit ratings: Scout: Rivals: (76)				
**Dontrelle Inman**; WR/S	Batesburg, South Carolina	Batesburg-Leesville High School	6 ft 3 in (1.91 m)	185 lb (84 kg)	Dec 14, 2006
**Dontrelle Inman**; WR/S	Recruit ratings: Scout: Rivals: (79)				
**Nick Jenkins**; DT	Wheaton, Maryland	Our Lady Good Counsel High School	6 ft 3 in (1.91 m)	295 lb (134 kg)	Jun 30, 2006
**Nick Jenkins**; DT	Recruit ratings: Scout: Rivals: (78)				
**Dominique Joseph**; WR/CB	Philadelphia, Pennsylvania	Roman Catholic High School	6 ft 0 in (1.83 m)	195 lb (88 kg)	Mar 3, 2006
**Dominique Joseph**; WR/CB	Recruit ratings: Scout: Rivals: (70)				
**Peter Lalich**; QB	Springfield, Virginia	West Springfield High School	6 ft 5 in (1.96 m)	230 lb (100 kg)	Apr 25, 2006
**Peter Lalich**; QB	Recruit ratings: Scout: Rivals: (78)				
**Anthony Mihota**; DE	Fredericksburg, Virginia	Massaponax High School	6 ft 5 in (1.96 m)	255 lb (116 kg)	Feb 7, 2007
**Anthony Mihota**; DE	Recruit ratings: Scout: Rivals: (71)				
**Max Milien**; RB	Arlington, Virginia	Yorktown High School	6 ft 1 in (1.85 m)	195 lb (88 kg)	Mar 18, 2006
**Max Milien**; RB	Recruit ratings: Scout: Rivals: (40)				
**Lamar Milstead**; OT	Washington, D.C.	Coolidge High School	6 ft 6 in (1.98 m)	280 lb (130 kg)	Jan 15, 2007
**Lamar Milstead**; OT	Recruit ratings: Scout: Rivals: (78)				
**Chase Minnifield**; CB	Lexington, Kentucky	Henry Clay High School	6 ft 0 in (1.83 m)	183 lb (83 kg)	May 22, 2006
**Chase Minnifield**; CB	Recruit ratings: Scout: Rivals: (71)				
**Corey Mosley**; RB	Richmond, Virginia	Henrico High School	5 ft 8 in (1.73 m)	195 lb (88 kg)	Feb 7, 2007
**Corey Mosley**; RB	Recruit ratings: Scout: Rivals: (40)				
**Zane Parr**; DT	Williamsport, Pennsylvania	Williamsport Area Senior High School	6 ft 5 in (1.96 m)	290 lb (130 kg)	Oct 22, 2006
**Zane Parr**; DT	Recruit ratings: Scout: Rivals: (40)				
**Aaron Taliaferro**; LB	Gloucester, Virginia	Gloucester High School	6 ft 2 in (1.88 m)	215 lb (98 kg)	May 23, 2006
**Aaron Taliaferro**; LB	Recruit ratings: Scout: Rivals: (40)				
**J'Courtney Williams**; LB	Christchurch, Virginia	Christchurch High School	6 ft 4 in (1.93 m)	215 lb (98 kg)	Apr 22, 2006
**J'Courtney Williams**; LB	Recruit ratings: Scout: Rivals: (79)				
Overall recruit ranking: Scout: #32 Rivals: #25
Note: In many cases, Scout, Rivals, 247Sports, On3, and ESPN may conflict in their listings of height and weight.; In these cases, the average was taken. ESPN grades are on a 100-point scale.; Sources: "2007 Virginia Football Commitment List". Rivals.; "Scout.com Football Recruiting: Virginia". Scout.; "2007 Player Commitments – Virginia". ESPN.; "Scout.com Team Recruiting Rankings". Scout.; "2007 Team Ranking". Rivals.com.

=== Roster ===
Virginia's first official depth chart for the 2007 football season was announced August 28, prior to the Cavaliers' season opener against Wyoming on September 1. Click here to see depth charts for each individual game.

**Quarterbacks**: 10 **Jameel Sewell** – Sophomore; 7 Peter Lalich – Freshman; 15 Scott Deke – Junior; 1 Patch Duda – Freshman (RS); 6 Marc Verica – Freshman (RS); 13 Brendan Lane – Freshman; **Tail backs**: 37 **Cedric Peerman** – Junior; 5 Mikell Simpson – Sophomore; 21 Andrew Pearman – Junior; 27 Hall Simmons – Sophomore; 28 William Webb – Freshman; 32 Keith Payne – Freshman (RS); 36 Max Milien – Freshman; 25 Rob Lewis - Junior; 44 Raynard Horne – Freshman (RS); **Wide receivers**: 22 **Staton Jobe** – Freshman (RS); 80 **Maurice Covington** – Junior; 18 Kris Burd – Freshman; 20 Kevin Ogletree – Junior; 23 Dom Joseph – Freshman; 23 Zach Mendez-Zfass – Freshman (RS); 26 Cary Koch – Junior; 39 Chris Gorham – Senior; 81 Dontrelle Inman – Freshman (RS); 84 Jared Green – Freshman; 89 Chris Dalton – Freshman (RS); **Fullbacks**: 31 **Rashawn Jackson** – Sophomore; 25 Josh Zidenberg – Senior; 47 Curt Orshoski – Freshman; **Tight ends**: 86 **Tom Santi** – Senior; 82 Mark Ambrose – Freshman; 83 Joe Torchia – Freshman (RS); 85 John Phillips – Junior; 87 Andrew Devlin – Freshman; 88 Jonathan Stupar – Senior; 90 Crutcher Reiss – Sophomore; 91 Andrew Dewey – Sophomore; 92 Tony Konstant – Junior	**Center**: 63 **Jordy Lipsey** – Senior; 64 Jack Shields – Freshman (RS); **Offensive guard**: 71 **Branden Albert** – Junior; 77 **Ian-Yates Cunningham** – Senior; 65 B.J. Cabbell – Freshman (RS); 74 Patrick Slebonick – Sophomore; 78 Isaac Cain – Freshman (RS); 79 Gordie Sammis – Senior; **Offensive tackle**: 61 **Will Barker** – Sophomore; 75 **Eugene Monroe** – Junior; 76 Zak Stair – Junior; **Offensive linemen**: 62 Billy Cuffee – Freshman; 67 Landon Bradley – Freshman; 68 Anthony Mihota – Freshman; 69 Lamar Milstead – Freshman; 72 Dave Roberts – Freshman; **Linebackers**: 51 **Clint Sintim** – Junior; 54 **Jon Copper** – Junior; 57 **Jermaine Dias** – Senior; 58 **Antonio Appleby** – Junior; 33 John Bivens LB – Freshman (RS); 41 Aaron Clark – Junior; 42 Darnell Carter – Freshman (RS); 45 Denzel Burrell – Sophomore; 46 J'Courtney Williams – Freshman; 47 Daniel Childress – Freshman (RS); 49 Darren Childs – Sophomore; 50 Terrence Fells-Danzer – Freshman; 52 Aaron Taliaferro – Freshman; 53 Bernie McKeever – Junior; 55 Jared Detrick – Freshman; 59 John-Kevin Dolce – Freshman (RS)	**Cornerbacks**: 4 **Vic Hall** – Sophomore; 26 **Chris Cook** – Junior; 1 Trey Womack – Freshman (RS); 19 Ras-I Dowling – Freshman; 28 Mike Brown – Junior; 32 Brandon Jarvis – Junior; 43 Mike Parker – Freshman (RS); **Safeties**: 22 **Byron Glaspy** – Junior; 30 **Nate Lyles** – Senior; 17 Brandon Woods – Sophomore; 27 Jamaal Jackson – Senior; 29 Rico Bell – Freshman (RS); 34 Matt Leemhuis – Freshman (RS); 40 Corey Mosley – Freshman; **Defensive backs**: 31 Chase Minnifield – Freshman; **Defensive ends**: 91 **Chris Long** – Senior; 95 **Jeffrey Fitzgerald** – Sophomore; 72 John Roberts – Junior; 74 Pete Bladel – Senior; 90 Jason Fuller – Sophomore; 93 Alex Field – Junior; 99 Sean Gottschalk – Freshman (RS); **Defensive line**: 70 Matt Conrath – Freshman; 92 Zane Parr – Freshman; 96 Nick Jenkins – Freshman; **Nose tackles**: 94 **Allen Billyk** – Senior; 98 Nate Collins – Sophomore; **Place Kickers**: 9 **Chris Gould** – Senior; 11 Chris Hinkebein – Freshman; **Punters**: 16 **Ryan Weigand** – Senior; 4 John Thornton – Junior; **Long Snappers**: 66 **Danny Aiken** – Freshman
Opening day starters in **bold**

=== Watch list ===
- Jameel Sewell
  - Davey O'Brien Award
- Chris Long
  - Pre–season All American
  - Mid–season All American (Rivals, Sports Illustrated, CollegeFootballNews.com and Phil Steele's College Football Preview)
  - Outland Trophy
  - Lombardi Award
  - Chuck Bednarik Award
  - Bronko Nagurski Trophy
  - Ted Hendricks Award
  - Lott Trophy
- Tom Santi
  - John Mackey Award
  - Draddy Trophy – semi-finalist

== Game summaries ==
=== Wyoming ===
	1	2	3	4	Total
Virginia	0	3	0	0	3
Wyoming	3	7	3	10	23

With only 110 yards of total offense and just 7 yards on the ground, the Cavaliers were outmatched by a better-prepared Wyoming team.

Scoring summary

Quarter	Time	Drive			Team	Scoring information	Score	
Quarter	Time	Plays	Yards	TOP	Team	Scoring information	Virginia	Wyoming
1	04:41		44	4:44	Wyoming	48-yard field goal by B. VINNEDGE	0	3
2	13:35		73	3:07	Wyoming	G. BOLLING 4-yard touchdown reception from K. SWEEN, B. VINNEDGE kick good	0	10
2	00:00		18	0:40	Virginia	42-yard field goal by C. GOULD	3	10
3	08:36		42	4:04	Wyoming	40-yard field goal by B. VINNEDGE	3	13
4	06:17		59	1:57	Wyoming	D. MOORE 39-yard touchdown run, B. VINNEDGE kick good	3	20
4	02:48		46	2:22	Wyoming	39-yard field goal by B. VINNEDGE	3	23
"TOP" = time of possession. For other American football terms, see Glossary of American football.							3	23

=== Duke ===
	1	2	3	4	Total
Duke	2	0	11	0	13
Virginia	14	3	0	7	24

Tight end Tom Santi scored two touchdowns and tailback Cedric Peerman ran for 137 yards with 1 touchdown. Quarterbacks Jameel Sewell and Peter Lalich platooned for 191 yards through the air and one touchdown.

Scoring summary

Quarter	Time	Drive			Team	Scoring information	Score	
Quarter	Time	Plays	Yards	TOP	Team	Scoring information	Duke	Virginia
1	11:40		4	0:43	Virginia	T. SANTI 7-yard touchdown reception from J. SEWELL, C. GOULD kick good	0	7
1	08:13		82	1:47	Virginia	C. PEERMAN 58-yard touchdown run, C. GOULD kick good	0	14
1	02:18				Duke	D. AIKEN snapped ball over C. GOULD's head through the end zone for a safety	2	14
2	00:00		38	2:42	Virginia	27-yard field goal by C. GOULD	2	17
3	02:51		16	0:56	Duke	J. WRIGHT 16-yard touchdown reception from T. LEWIS, 2-point pass to T. ROBINSON from T. LEWIS good	10	17
3	01:04		16	1:37	Duke	21-yard field goal by J. SURGAN	13	17
4	09:39		82	6:18	Virginia	T. SANTI 4-yard touchdown reception from P. LALICH, C. GOULD kick good	13	24
"TOP" = time of possession. For other American football terms, see Glossary of American football.							13	24

=== North Carolina ===
	1	2	3	4	Total
Virginia	10	6	3	3	22
North Carolina	0	7	7	6	20

Place kicker Chris Gould tied the school record held by Rafael Garcia (versus Virginia Tech, 1994) and Connor Hughes (versus Georgia Tech, 2003) by making five field goals and Cedric Peerman set a career-high in rushing for 186 yards and 1 touchdown on 30 carries. It represents the first road triumph since 2006's Sept. 30 victory at Duke and just the second since a Sept. 17, 2005, win at Syracuse.

Scoring summary

Quarter	Time	Drive			Team	Scoring information	Score	
Quarter	Time	Plays	Yards	TOP	Team	Scoring information	Virginia	North Carolina
1	07:50		68	6:05	Virginia	C. PEERMAN 1-yard touchdown run, C. GOULD kick good	7	0
1	03:29		13	2:06	Virginia	51-yard field goal by C. GOULD	10	0
2	11:39		56	3:12	Virginia	28-yard field goal by C. GOULD	13	0
2	06:19		64	4:16	Virginia	37-yard field goal by C. GOULD	16	0
2	00:22		72	1:41	N. Carolina	H. NICKS 4-yard touchdown reception from T. YATES, C. BARTH kick good	16	7
3	06:49		57	8:11	Virginia	48-yard field goal by C. GOULD	19	7
3	04:37		80	2:12	N. Carolina	H. NICKS 53-yard touchdown reception from T. YATES, C. BARTH kick good	19	14
4	08:56		15	5:07	Virginia	32-yard field goal by C. GOULD	22	14
4	01:57		85	1:33	N. Carolina	R. QUINN 2-yard touchdown reception from T. YATES, 2-point pass failed	22	20
"TOP" = time of possession. For other American football terms, see Glossary of American football.							22	20

=== Georgia Tech ===
	1	2	3	4	Total
Georgia Tech	7	10	6	0	23
Virginia	21	0	0	7	28

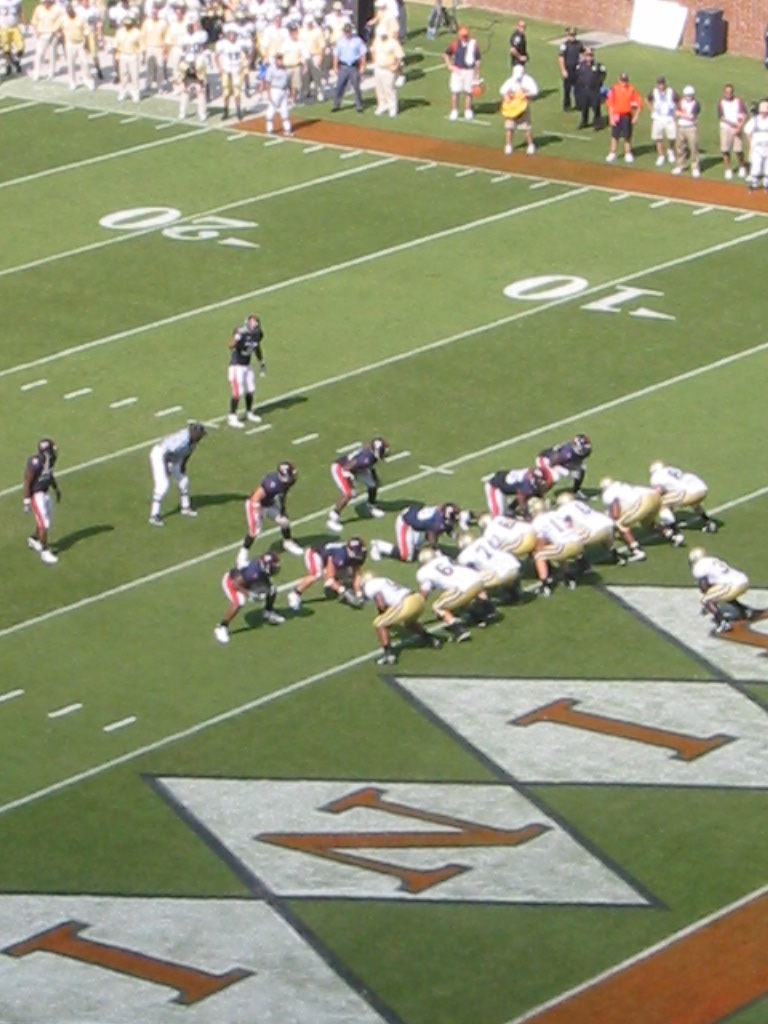
Georgia Tech lines up in their own endzone

Virginia survived Georgia Tech erasing a 14-point deficit and hung on to win their third straight ACC game 28–23. Tailback Cedric Peerman ran for 138 yards and scored a touchdown while punter Ryan Weigand averaged 47.5 yards on 8 punts with a long of 58 to keep Georgia Tech's offense at bay. Two key turnovers, an interception and fumble led to Virginia touchdowns. Defensive end Chris Long anchored the Cavalier defense with nine tackles including one for loss as well as two batted balls, one returned for a touchdown by fellow lineman Jeffery Fitzgerald, and a game-saving sack on 4th down late in the 4th quarter. Virginia quarterbacks combined to go 20 for 35 with one interception and one touchdown.

Scoring summary

Quarter	Time	Drive			Team	Scoring information	Score	
Quarter	Time	Plays	Yards	TOP	Team	Scoring information	Georgia Tech	Virginia
1	13:01		63	1:59	G. Tech	D. THOMAS 56-yard touchdown reception from T. BENNETT, T. BELL kick good	7	0
1	11:22		81	1:33	Virginia	C. PEERMAN 4-yard touchdown run, C. GOULD kick good	7	7
1	02:26		81	1:33	Virginia	J. SEWELL 4-yard touchdown run, C. GOULD kick good	7	14
1	02:01		25	00:08	Virginia	Interception returned 25 yards for touchdown by J. FITZGERALD, C. GOULD kick good	7	21
2	12:27		30	0:48	G. Tech	J. DWYER 21-yard touchdown run, T. BELL kick good	14	21
2	00:05		65	1:29	G. Tech	30-yard field goal by T. BELL	17	21
3	11:45		23	1:52	G. Tech	43-yard field goal by T. BELL	20	21
3	04:22		15	2:15	G. Tech	43-yard field goal by T. BELL	23	21
4	08:56		26	0:06	Virginia	S. JOBE 26-yard touchdown reception from J. SEWELL, C. GOULD kick good	23	28
"TOP" = time of possession. For other American football terms, see Glossary of American football.							23	28

=== Pittsburgh ===
	1	2	3	4	Total
Pittsburgh	0	7	0	7	14
Virginia	27	3	0	14	44

Virginia dominated the first quarter jumping out to a 27–0 lead. Pittsburgh's offense sputtered throughout the contest allowing the Cavaliers to take advantage of excellent field position. Jameel Sewell went 16 of 31 for 169 yards and three touchdowns while Cedric Peerman continued excelling on the ground with 87 yards on 24 carries.

Scoring summary

Quarter	Time	Drive			Team	Scoring information	Score	
Quarter	Time	Plays	Yards	TOP	Team	Scoring information	Pittsburgh	Virginia
1	13:37		39	1:23	Virginia	J. STUPAR 2-yard touchdown reception from J. SEWELL, C. GOULD kick blocked	0	6
1	09:06		51	2:03	Virginia	T. SANTI 18-yard touchdown reception from J. SEWELL, C. GOULD kick good	0	13
1	06:15		26	2:15	Virginia	R. JACKSON 5-yard touchdown reception from J. SEWELL, C. GOULD kick good	0	20
1	01:22		21	2:13	Virginia	C. PEERMAN 1-yard touchdown run, C. GOULD kick good	0	27
2	08:52		70	4:37	Virginia	23-yard field goal by C. GOULD	0	30
2	05:00		22	1:06	Pittsburgh	L. MCCOY 1-yard touchdown run, C. LEE kick good	7	30
4	14:54		57	2:52	Pittsburgh	O. TURNER 2-yard touchdown reception from P. BOSTICK, C. LEE kick good	14	30
4	12:06		59	2:48	Virginia	C. PEERMAN 13-yard touchdown run, C. GOULD kick good	14	37
4	05:25		63	4:23	Virginia	V. HALL 4-yard touchdown run, C. GOULD kick good	14	44
"TOP" = time of possession. For other American football terms, see Glossary of American football.							14	44

=== Middle Tennessee State ===
	1	2	3	4	Total
Virginia	7	7	0	9	23
MTSU	7	7	0	7	21

Place kicker Chris Gould kicked a 34 yard field goal with 8-seconds left to secure a last second victory. Virginia running backs combined for 151 yards on the ground while quarterback Jameel Sewell threw for 223 yards with an interception and a touchdown. Despite being huge underdogs, Middle Tennessee hung around the entire game and led by one late due to a blocked extra point. Virginia's decisive scoring drive started from their own 20 with less than two minutes to go and no time outs.

Scoring summary

Quarter	Time	Drive			Team	Scoring information	Score	
Quarter	Time	Plays	Yards	TOP	Team	Scoring information	Virginia	Middle Tennessee
1	04:36		67	5:37	MTSU	T. HENRY 24-yard touchdown reception from D. DASHER, M. KING kick good	0	7
1	01:45		80	2:51	UVA	J. PHILLIPS 20-yard touchdown reception from J. SEWELL, C. GOULD kick good	7	7
2	09:37		60	2:26	MTSU	B. WILLIAMS 7-yard touchdown reception from D. DASHER, M. KING kick good	7	14
2	03:57		85	2:42	UVA	A. PEARMAN 21-yard touchdown run, C. GOULD kick good	14	14
4	13:58		85	6:11	UVA	A. PEARMAN 5-yard touchdown run, C. GOULD kick blocked	20	14
4	07:29		1	0:04	MTSU	D. MCNAIR 5-yard touchdown run, M. KING kick good	20	21
4	00:04		63	1:18	UVA	34-yard field goal by C. GOULD	23	21
"TOP" = time of possession. For other American football terms, see Glossary of American football.							23	21

=== Connecticut ===
	1	2	3	4	Total
UConn	6	0	7	3	16
Virginia	7	7	0	3	17

With a strong defensive effort, the Virginia Cavaliers held off the previously undefeated Connecticut Huskies 17-16. Despite a very poor outing from Jameel Sewell, the Cavs drove the length of the field with Chris Gould chipping in a 19 yard field goal to win the game. The win propelled Virginia to be ranked #24 in the Coaches Poll and #19 in the first BCS rankings for the first time in 3 years.

Scoring summary

Quarter	Time	Drive			Team	Scoring information	Score	
Quarter	Time	Plays	Yards	TOP	Team	Scoring information	Connecticut	Virginia
1	10:47		26	2:35	UCONN	45-yard field goal by T. CIARAVINO	3	0
1	09:07		9	1:33	UCONN	21-yard field goal by T. CIARAVINO	6	0
1	00:38		59	4:18	UVA	K. PAYNE 1-yard touchdown run, C. GOULD kick good	6	7
2	05:19		65	2:20	UVA	J. PHILLIPS 8-yard touchdown reception from J. SEWELL, C. GOULD kick good	6	14
3	10:31		6	0:41	UCONN	S. BROUSE 6-yard touchdown reception from T. LORENZEN, T. CIARAVINO kick good	13	14
4	08:06		81	3:22	UCONN	25-yard field goal by T. CIARAVINO	16	14
4	03:20		79	4:46	UVA	19-yard field goal by C. GOULD	16	17
"TOP" = time of possession. For other American football terms, see Glossary of American football.							16	17

=== Maryland ===
	1	2	3	4	Total
Virginia	3	7	2	6	18
Maryland	7	7	3	0	17

In another last minute victory, tailback Mikell Simpson scored the game-winning touchdown with 16 seconds left. The play had to be reviewed by the officials due to the ball leaving Simpson's hands as he dove across the line, but the touchdown stood giving Virginia their seventh victory in a row. Defensive end Chris Long tackled Maryland quarterback Chris Turner in the end zone for a critical safety late in the third quarter bringing the Virginia deficit down to five.

Scoring summary

Quarter	Time	Drive			Team	Scoring information	Score	
Quarter	Time	Plays	Yards	TOP	Team	Scoring information	Virginia	Maryland
1	11:31		66	3:29	UVA	45-yard field goal by C. GOULD	3	0
1	06:53		69	4:38	UMD	K. LATTIMORE 3-yard touchdown run, O. EGEKEZE kick good	3	7
2	11:57		53	2:48	UMD	L. BALL 1-yard touchdown run, O. EGEKEZE kick good	3	14
2	03:35		66	1:00	UVA	M. SIMPSON 44-yard touchdown run, C. GOULD kick good	10	14
3	08:53		53	6:07	UMD	41-yard field goal by O. EGEKEZE	10	17
3	00:02				UVA	C. TURNER tackled in end zone for a safety by C. LONG	12	17
4	03:35		66	1:00	UVA	M. SIMPSON 44-yard touchdown run, 2-point run failed	18	17
"TOP" = time of possession. For other American football terms, see Glossary of American football.							18	17

=== N.C. State ===
	1	2	3	4	Total
Virginia	3	14	0	7	24
N.C. State	7	13	3	6	29

N.C. State quarterback Daniel Evans threw for 347 yards and 3 touchdowns while wide receiver Donal Bowens was on the receiving end of 202 of those yards. Despite a poor performance from the Virginia defense, the Virginia offense still scraped together 24 points on a streaky night by quarterback Jameel Sewell.

Scoring summary

Quarter	Time	Drive			Team	Scoring information	Score	
Quarter	Time	Plays	Yards	TOP	Team	Scoring information	Virginia	N.C. State
1	12:30		37	0:54	NCSU	D. BOWEN 40-yard touchdown reception from D. EVANS, S. HAUSCHKA kick good	0	7
1	06:43		71	5:47	UVA	23-yard field goal by C. GOULD	3	7
2	13:21		63	4:18	NCSU	30-yard field goal by S. HAUSCHKA	3	10
2	05:22		49	4:43	NCSU	42-yard field goal by S. HAUSCHKA	3	13
2	03:04		61	2:18	UVA	M. SIMPSON 13-yard touchdown reception from J. SEWELL, C. GOULD kick good	10	13
2	01:31		75	1:33	NCSU	K. GEORGE 25-yard touchdown reception from D. EVANS, S. HAUSCHKA kick good	10	20
2	00:27		64	1:04	UVA	C. KOCH 7-yard touchdown reception from J. SEWELL, C. GOULD kick good	17	20
3	11:08		69	3:52	NCSU	23-yard field goal by S. HAUSCHKA	17	23
4	13:12		44	2:33	UVA	M. SIMPSON 5-yard touchdown run, C. GOULD kick good	24	23
4	07:37		60	1:00	NCSU	D. BOWEN 30-yard touchdown reception from D. EVANS, 2-point pass failed	24	29
"TOP" = time of possession. For other American football terms, see Glossary of American football.							24	29

=== Wake Forest ===
	1	2	3	4	Total
Wake Forest	3	3	7	3	16
Virginia	3	7	0	7	17

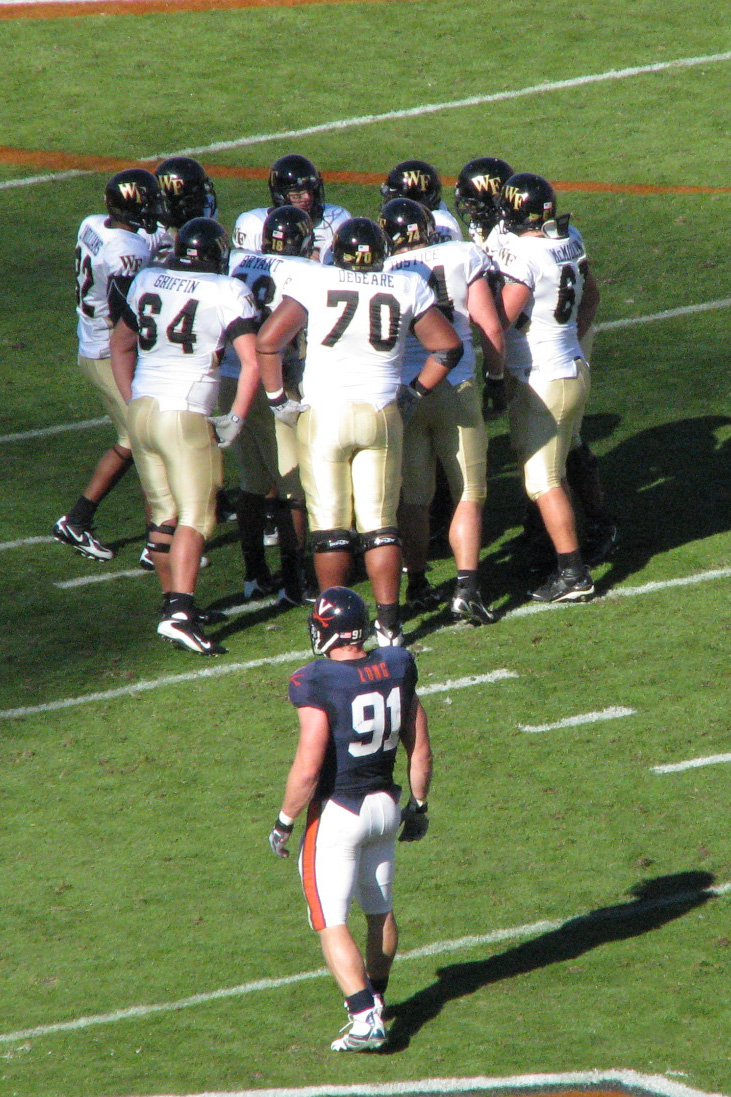
Virginia defensive end Chris Long surveys the Wake Forest offense

Virginia running back Mikell Simpson scored the go ahead touchdown with 2:18 left in the 4th quarter and Wake Forest kicker Sam Swank missed a 48 yard field goal with 2 seconds left sealing the Virginia victory. The Virginia defense was anchored by defensive end Chris Long who recorded 10 tackles and a sack. The win was Virginia's 5th win this season by two points or less breaking the NCAA record set by Columbia in 1971.

Scoring summary

Quarter	Time	Drive			Team	Scoring information	Score	
Quarter	Time	Plays	Yards	TOP	Team	Scoring information	Wake Forest	Virginia
1	10:09		50	4:51	WAKE	27-yard field goal by S. SWANK	3	0
1	07:14		18	2:55	UVA	44-yard field goal by C. GOULD	3	3
2	10:28		25	3:18	WAKE	25-yard field goal by S. SWANK	6	3
2	00:10		56	1:01	UVA	M. COVINGTON 39-yard touchdown reception from J. SEWELL, C. GOULD kick good	6	10
3	02:10		81	6:53	WAKE	K. MOORE 13-yard touchdown reception from R. SKINNER, C. GOULD kick good	13	10
4	10:12		57	4:32	WAKE	31-yard field goal by S. SWANK	16	10
4	02:18		56	3:57	UVA	M. SIMPSON 1-yard touchdown run, C. GOULD kick good	16	17
"TOP" = time of possession. For other American football terms, see Glossary of American football.							16	17

=== Miami ===
	1	2	3	4	Total
Virginia	14	17	7	10	48
Miami	0	0	0	0	0

On an emotional night for the Miami Hurricanes as they played their last game in the historic Miami Orange Bowl, the Cavaliers dominated all facets of the game shutting out the home team 48-0. Quarterback Jameel Sewell completed 20 of 25 passes for 288 yards, threw for a touchdown and ran for one as well. Tailback Mikell Simpson contributed 93 yards and two one-yard touchdown carries. The Cavalier defense posted three interceptions, four sacks, two fumble recoveries, seven tackles for loss and a touchdown. The win set up a Thanksgiving match-up versus cross-state rival Virginia Tech playing for the Atlantic Coast Conference Coastal Division title and the chance to play in the 3rd Annual Atlantic Coast Conference Championship game.

Scoring summary

Quarter	Time	Drive			Team	Scoring information	Score	
Quarter	Time	Plays	Yards	TOP	Team	Scoring information	Virginia	Miami
1	08:26		96	3:07	UVA	M. COVINGTON 29-yard touchdown reception from J. SEWELL, C. GOULD kick good	7	0
1	01:08		4	0:44	UVA	K. PAYNE 5-yard touchdown run, C. GOULD kick good	14	0
2	13:29		6	0:29	UVA	33-yard field goal by C. GOULD	17	0
2	10:02		38	1:25	UVA	J. SEWELL 1-yard touchdown run, C. GOULD kick good	24	0
2	04:56		72	2:39	UVA	M. SIMPSON 1-yard touchdown run, C. GOULD kick good	31	0
3	10:48		67	4:12	UVA	M. SIMPSON 1-yard touchdown run, C. GOULD kick good	38	0
4	05:28		42	07:38	UVA	41-yard field goal by C. GOULD	41	0
4	02:26				UVA	Fumble recovery returned 44 yards for touchdown by C. COOK, C. GOULD kick good	48	0
"TOP" = time of possession. For other American football terms, see Glossary of American football.							48	0

=== Virginia Tech ===
	1	2	3	4	Total
Virginia Tech	13	7	3	10	33
Virginia	7	7	7	0	21

In a game with a trip to the conference championship game on the line, the Cavaliers fell flat against their in-state rivals Virginia Tech. Poor clock management and poor defense allowed Virginia Tech to exploit Virginia en route to an easy 33–21 win.

Scoring summary

Quarter	Time	Drive			Team	Scoring information	Score	
Quarter	Time	Plays	Yards	TOP	Team	Scoring information	Virginia Tech	Virginia
1	12:12		41	1:19	VT	T. TAYLOR 9-yard touchdown run, J. DUNLEVY kick good	7	0
1	05:47		65	5:23	VT	20-yard field goal by J. DUNLEVY	10	0
1	02:37		72	3:10	UVA	M. SIMPSON 27-yard touchdown run, C. GOULD kick good	10	7
1	00:34		60	2:03	VT	37-yard field goal by J. DUNLEVY	13	7
2	06:35		52	3:36	UVA	J. SEWELL 8-yard touchdown run, C. GOULD kick good	13	14
2	00:12		65	0:28	VT	E. ROYAL 39-yard touchdown reception from S. GLENNON, J. DUNLEVY kick good	20	14
3	07:51		15	3:16	VT	29-yard field goal by J. DUNLEVY	23	14
3	02:51		28	2:46	UVA	J. SEWELL 2-yard touchdown run, C. GOULD kick good	23	21
4	11:50		68	3:00	VT	T. TAYLOR 5-yard touchdown run, J. DUNLEVY kick good	30	21
4	04:56		58	4:54	VT	26-yard field goal by J. DUNLEVY	33	21
"TOP" = time of possession. For other American football terms, see Glossary of American football.							33	21

=== Gator Bowl – Texas Tech ===
	1	2	3	4	Total
Texas Tech	7	0	7	17	31
Virginia	9	12	0	7	28

== Statistics ==
=== Team ===
	Team	Opp
Scoring	317	256
Points per game	24.4	19.7
First downs	249	228
Rushing	109	79
Passing	125	136
Penalty	15	13
Total offense	4295	4322
Avg per play	4.7	4.7
Avg per game	330.4	332.5
Fumbles-Lost	25–10	21–11
Penalties-Yards	62–532	84–646
Avg per game	40.9	49.7

	Team	Opp
Punts-Yards	81–3313	72–3064
Avg per punt	40.9	42.6
Time of possession/Game	29:39	30:21
3rd down conversions	83/203	73/209
4th down conversions	8/14	16/28
Touchdowns scored	38	27
Field goals-Attempts-Long	16–20–	22–30
PAT-Attempts	35–37	24–24
Attendance	358,944	283,077
Games/Avg per Game	6/59,824	6/47,180

==== Scores by quarter ====
	1	2	3	4	Total
Virginia	125	93	19	80	317
Opponents	62	68	57	69	256

=== Offense ===
==== Rushing ====
Name	GP-GS	Att	Gain	Loss	Net	Avg	TD	Long	Avg/G
Cedric Peerman	6–6	113	620	35	585	5.2	5	58	97.5
Mikell Simpson	13–	113	605	35	570	5.0	8	96	43.8
Jameel Sewell	13–	126	485	206	279	2.2	4	18	21.5
Keith Payne	10–	58	235	16	219	3.8	2	17	21.9
Andrew Pearman	12–	37	152	8	144	3.9	2	21	12.0
Rashawn Jackson	11–	20	75	3	72	3.6	0	12	6.5
Chris Gorham	11–	2	14	0	14	7.0	0	8	1.3
Vic Hall	13–	1	4	0	4	4.0	1	4	0.3
Branden Albert	13–	1	2	0	2	2.0	0	2	0.2
Josh Zidenberg	13–	1	0	0	0	0.0	0	0	0.0
Peter Lalich	8–	9	0	60	-60	-6.7	0	0	-7.5
TEAM	13–13	9	0	66	-66	-7.3	0	0	-5.1
Total	13–13	490	2192	429	1763	3.6	22	96	135.6
Opponents	13–13	472	1801	411	1390	2.9	9	49	106.9

==== Passing ====
Name	GP-GS	Effic	Att-Cmp-Int	Pct	Yds	TD	Lng	Avg/G
Jameel Sewell	13–13	114.94	364–214–9	58.8	2176	12	45	167.4
Peter Lalich	8–0	109.12	61–35–1	57.4	321	2	31	40.1
TEAM	13–13	0.00	2–2–0	0.0	0	0	0	0.0
Vic Hall	13–13	394.00	1–1–0	100.0	35	0	35	2.7
Total	13–13	114.23	428–250–10	58.4	2532	14	45	194.8
Opponents	13–13	120.95	452–263–11	58.2	2932	18	56	225.5

==== Receiving ====
Name	GP-GS	No.	Yds	Avg	TD	Long	Avg/G
Mikell Simpson	13–	43	402	9.3	2	30	30.9
Jonathan Stupar	13–	40	359	9.0	2	23	27.6
Tom Santi	12–	36	418	11.6	3	45	34.8
Maurice Covington	9–	21	269	12.8	2	39	29.9
John Phillips	13–	17	193	11.4	2	30	14.8
Dontrelle Inman	13–	17	181	10.6	0	31	13.9
Staton Jobe	13–	17	163	9.6	1	26	12.5
Andrew Pearman	12–	13	99	7.6	0	19	8.2
Cedric Peerman	6–	12	99	8.2	0	25	16.5
Cary Koch	10–	9	97	10.8	1	15	9.7
Chris Gorham	11–	8	123	15.4	0	35	11.2
Rashawn Jackson	11–	8	46	5.8	1	15	4.2
Keith Payne	10–	5	45	9.0	0	16	4.5
Josh Zidenberg	13–	4	38	9.5	0	17	2.9
Total	13–13	250	2532	10.1	14	45	194.8
Opponents	13–13	263	2932	11.1	18	56	225.5

=== Defense ===
Name	GP	Tackles				Sacks	Pass defense			Fumbles		Blkd Kick	Saf
Name	GP	Solo	Ast	Total	TFL-Yds	No-Yds	Int-Yds	BrUp	QBH	Rcv-Yds	FF	Blkd Kick	Saf
54 Jon Copper	13	56	53	109	9.0-32	3.0-24	2-7	1	3	.	.	.	.
91 Chris Long	13	36	43	79	19.0-132	14.0-122	1-25	9	23	.	2	1	.
51 Clint Sintim	13	44	33	77	9.0-48	9.0-48	.	.	17	.	2	.	.
95 J. Fitzgerald	13	33	40	73	11.5-39	7.0-31	2-25	4	15	1-0	2	.	.
22 Byron Glaspy	13	41	30	71	2.0-5	.	1-29	4	.	1-0	.	.	.
30 Nate Lyles	13	39	29	68	4.5-14	1.0-9	.	2	.	.	1	.	.
58 Antonio Appleby	13	24	36	60	5.0-18	2.5-13	.	6	1	1-0	.	.	.
4 Vic Hall	13	33	25	58	.	.	1-3	3	.	.	.	.	.
57 Jermaine Dias	12	31	23	54	1.5-3	.	.	1	2	.	.	.	.
19 Ras-I Dowling	12	30	14	44	.	.	2-17	9	.	.	2	.	.
26 Chris Cook	9	25	14	39	1.0-2	.	1-25	6	1	1-44	.	.	.
27 Jamaal Jackson	13	22	17	39	.	.	1-3	4	.	1-0	.	.	.
94 Allen Billyk	13	18	20	38	2.5-5	1.0-3	.	1	6	.	.	.	.
98 Nate Collins	13	12	19	31	4.5-22	2.0-20	.	.	1	1-0	.	.	.
43 Mike Parker	13	19	7	26	.	.	.	4	.	2-0	.	.	.
25 Josh Zidenberg	13	11	5	16	.	.	.	.	.	.	.	1	.
45 Denzel Burrell	13	5	7	12	1.0-3	1.0-3	.	1	.	1-0	.	.	.
1 Trey Womack	12	7	5	12	.	.	.	.	1	1-0	.	.	.
93 Alex Field	13	2	9	11	2.5-12	1.5-10	.	.	1	1-0	.	.	.
41 Aaron Clark	13	6	3	9	1.0-8	1.0-8	.	.	.	.	.	.	.
17 Brandon Woods	13	2	4	6	.	.	.	1	.	.	.	.	.
66 Danny Aiken	13	3	2	5	.	.	.	.	.	.	.	.	.
85 John Phillips	13	1	3	4	.	.	.	.	.	.	.	.	.
86 Tom Santi	12	2	2	4	.	.	.	.	.	.	.	.	.
99 Sean Gottschalk	9	2	2	4	.	.	.	.	1	.	.	.	.
9 Chris Gould	13	2	1	3	.	.	.	.	.	.	.	.	.
33 John Bivens	7	1	2	3	.	.	.	.	.	.	.	.	.
55 Jared Detrick	11	2	1	3	.	.	.	.	.	.	.	.	.
16 Ryan Weigand	13	2	1	3	.	.	.	.	.	.	.	.	.
49 Darren Childs	3	1	1	2	.	.	.	.	.	.	.	.	.
53 Bernie McKeever	3	1	1	2	.	.	.	.	.	.	.	.	.
75 Eugene Monroe	11	1	.	1	.	.	.	.	.	.	.	.	.
34 Matt Leemhuis	1	1	.	1	.	.	.	.	.	.	.	.	.
42 Darnell Carter	6	.	1	1	.	.	.	.	.	.	.	.	.
32 Keith Payne	10	.	1	1	.	.	.	.	.	.	.	.	.
TM TEAM	13	1	.	1	.	.	.	.	.	.	.	.	3
83 Joe Torchia	12	.	1	1	.	.	.	.	.	.	.	.	.
29 Rico Bell	7	.	1	1	.	.	.	.	.	.	.	.	.
10 Jameel Sewell	13	1	.	1	.	.	.	.	.	.	.	.	.
88 Jonathan Stupar	13	1	.	1	.	.	.	.	.	.	.	.	.
77 I-Y Cunningham	13	1	.	1	.	.	.	.	.	.	.	.	.
39 Chris Gorham	11	1	.	1	.	.	.	.	.	.	.	.	.
Total..........	13	520	456	976	74-343	43-291	11-134	56	72	11-44	9	2	3
Opponents......	13	542	393	935	93-351	33-212	10-148	44	7	9-0	16	5	1

=== Special teams ===
Name	Punting								Kickoffs							
Name	No.	Yds	Avg	Long	TB	FC	I20	Blkd	No.	Yds	Avg	TB	OB	Retn	Net	YdLn
Ryan Weigand	52	2352	45.2	61	2	6	2	0	.	.	.	.	.	.	.	.
Chris Gould	26	949	36.5	51	3	4	19	0	65	4197	64.6	7	1	.	.	.
TEAM	3	12	4.0	11	0	0	0	3	.	.	.	.	.	.	.	.
Total..........	81	3313	40.9	61	5	10	21	3	65	4197	64.6	7	1	1185	44.2	25
Opponents......	72	3064	42.6	64	4	13	23	1	63	3949	62.7	10	0	1048	42.9	27

Name	Punt returns					Kick returns				
Name	No.	Yds	Avg	TD	Long	No.	Yds	Avg	TD	Long
Vic Hall	23	230	10.0	0	67	2	33	16.5	0	19
Andrew Pearman	4	1	0.2	0	2	29	608	21.0	0	67
Josh Zidenberg	1	21	21.0	0	0	11	250	22.7	0	55
Cedric Peerman	.	.	.	.	.	5	87	17.4	0	32
Mikell Simpson	.	.	.	.	.	3	57	19.0	0	23
Darnell Carter	.	.	.	.	.	1	0	0.0	0	0
Joe Torchia	.	.	.	.	.	1	13	13.0	0	13
TEAM	.	.	.	.	.	1	0	0.0	0	0
Total..........	28	252	9.0	0	67	53	1048	19.8	0	67
Opponents......	42	391	9.3	0	43	56	1185	21.2	0	37

== After the season ==
=== Awards ===
- Al Groh
  - ACC Coach of the Year
- Chris Long
  - Unanimous All-American
    - Associated Press First-Team All America Team
    - Football Writers of America Association First-Team All-America Team
    - American Football Coaches Association First-Team All-America Team
    - Walter Camp Football Foundation First-Team All-America
    - The Sporting News First-Team All-America
  - CBSSports.com First-Team All-America
  - Rivals.com First-Team All-America
  - Ted Hendricks Award winner as the nation's top defensive end
  - First-Team All-Atlantic Coast Conference
  - Dudley Award winner as the top collegiate player in the state of Virginia
  - Richmond Touchdown Club Defensive Lineman of the Year
  - ACC Defensive Player of the Year
- Branden Albert
  - Associated Press Third-Team All America Team
- Tom Santi
  - ACC James E. Tatum Award (top senior student-athlete)
