= Chris Long =

American football player (born 1985)

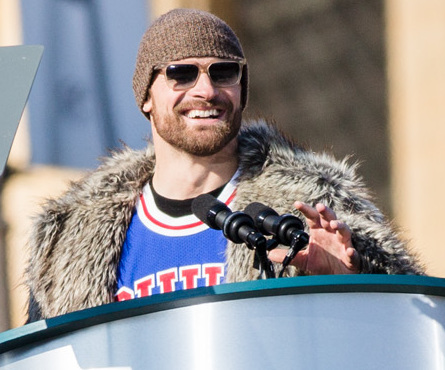
- Long at the Super Bowl LII victory parade, 2018

No. 72, 91, 95, 56
- Position: Defensive end

Personal information
- Born: March 28, 1985 (age 41); Santa Monica, California, U.S.
- Listed height: 6 ft 3 in (1.91 m)
- Listed weight: 270 lb (122 kg)

Career information
- High school: St. Anne's-Belfield School (Charlottesville, Virginia)
- College: Virginia (2004–2007)
- NFL draft: 2008: 1st round, 2nd overall pick

Career history
- St. Louis Rams (2008–2015); New England Patriots (2016); Philadelphia Eagles (2017–2018)

Awards and highlights
- 2× Super Bowl champion (LI, LII); NFLPA Alan Page Community Award (2018); Walter Payton NFL Man of the Year (2018); PFWA All-Rookie Team (2008); Ted Hendricks Award (2007); Dudley Award (2007); ACC Defensive Player of the Year (2007); Unanimous All-American (2007); First-team All-ACC (2007); Second-team All-ACC (2006); Virginia Cavaliers Jersey No. 91 retired

Career NFL statistics
- Total tackles: 332
- Sacks: 70.0
- Forced fumbles: 15
- Fumble recoveries: 6
- Stats at Pro Football Reference

Christopher Howard Long (born March 28, 1985) is an American former professional football player who was a defensive end in the National Football League (NFL) for 11 seasons. The son of Hall of Fame defensive end Howie Long and older brother of NFL guard Kyle Long, he played college football for the Virginia Cavaliers and won the Ted Hendricks Award as a senior. Long was selected by the St. Louis Rams second overall in the 2008 NFL draft, where he spent eight seasons. He later played one season for the New England Patriots and two for the Philadelphia Eagles, winning a Super Bowl title with each.

Long is one of six players to win consecutive Super Bowls for different teams, having won Super Bowl LI with the Patriots and Super Bowl LII with the Eagles. He also received the Walter Payton NFL Man of the Year in 2018 for his charitable work, which included donating his entire 2017 salary to charity.

== Early life ==
Chris Long was born in Santa Monica, California and is a son of Hall of Fame NFL defensive end Howie Long. He has two younger brothers, former NFL guard Kyle Long and Howie Long Jr., a scouting assistant and personnel assistant for the Las Vegas Raiders. He is a great-nephew of film director Irvin Kershner. He appeared in a 1980s anti-underage drinking public service announcement as an infant with his parents. Chris Long is the godson of Hall of Fame Quarterback Terry Bradshaw.

Long attended St. Anne's-Belfield School in Charlottesville, Virginia. As a senior in 2003, he was in on 91 tackles, 23 tackles for a loss, and 15 sacks, helping his team to an undefeated record and the state UIL school championship. "He was a big gangly kid who had yet to grow into his body," said John Blake, the St. Anne's-Belfield coach. "But he jumped in with both feet. When he played tackle, he would drive kids 10 or 15 yards down the field, like he was steering a car." He was given a 4-star ranking for college recruiting from Rivals.com, a service that rated him the sixth-best defensive end in the prep ranks. He played in the 2004 U.S. Army All-American Bowl. Long also played basketball, lacrosse, and baseball in high school.

== College career ==
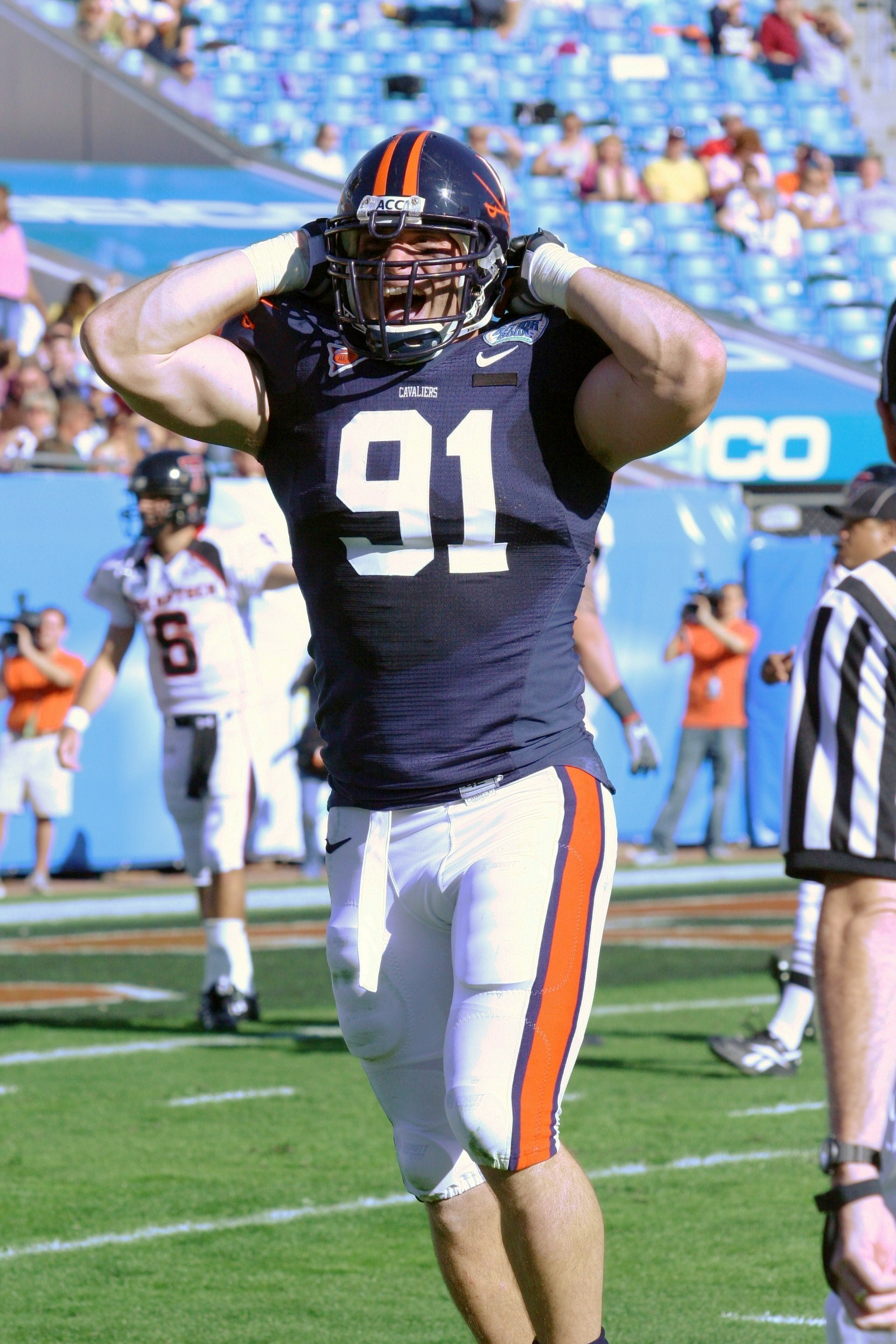
Long, as a member of the Cavaliers, in the Gator Bowl in January 2008

Long played college football at the University of Virginia under head coach Al Groh from 2004 to 2007, while pursuing a degree in sociology. As a freshman with the Cavaliers in 2004, he was a backup on the defensive line, but missed five games due to mononucleosis. Long ended the season with five tackles (two for a loss) and a sack.

As a sophomore in 2005, Long averaged 3.8 tackles per game, leading all Virginia defensive linemen. He totaled 46 tackles, with 10 tackles for a loss and 2 sacks. His 26 quarterback pressures led his team. He also shared the team lead in pass break-ups with seven.

In 2006, Long earned second-team All-ACC honors and was voted team captain. While starting all games, Long recorded 57 tackles, 12 for a loss, and 4 sacks. His 4.8 tackles per game was fourth among ACC defensive lineman. He was also a finalist for the Dudley Award, for the most outstanding player in the Commonwealth of Virginia and was an All-State selection.

Following his senior season in 2007, Long was recognized as a unanimous First-team All-American. Long was fourth nationally in tackling by a defensive lineman, averaging 5.3 tackles per game. In addition, North Carolina head coach Butch Davis, who coached against Long in North Carolina's ACC match-ups with Virginia, called Long one of the premier defensive linemen in the country.

Long entered the 2007 season on the watch lists for the Outland Trophy, Bronko Nagurski Trophy, Bednarik Trophy, Lombardi Trophy, Hendricks Award, and the Lott Trophy. He finished the season as a finalist for the Lombardi, Lott, and Nagurski Trophies. On December 5, Long won the 2007 Hendricks Award, given to the top defensive end in the nation. Long garnered more than 60 percent of the votes, the most ever for a winner in the history of the award. Additionally, Long received a first-place vote and finished 10th in the 2007 Heisman Trophy voting.

Long's #91 jersey was retired at the University of Virginia on November 24, 2007, making him the first to have his jersey retired while an active player.

== Professional career ==
=== Pre-draft ===
Pre-draft measurables
Height	Weight	Arm length	Hand span	40-yard dash	10-yard split	20-yard split	20-yard shuttle	Three-cone drill	Vertical jump	Broad jump	Bench press	Wonderlic
6 ft 3 in (1.91 m)	272 lb (123 kg)	32 1/2 in (0.83 m)	10 1/8 in (0.26 m)	4.75 s	1.53 s	2.71 s	4.21 s	7.02 s	34 in (0.86 m)	10 ft 4 in (3.15 m)	x reps	34
All values from NFL Combine

At the NFL Combine, Long did not lift the bench-press reps of 225 pounds because of an injured thumb.

Virginia Pro Day
Bench press: 370 lbs; Squat: 640 lbs; Power clean: 375 lbs

=== St. Louis Rams ===
Long was selected by the St. Louis Rams second overall in the 2008 NFL draft. The selection made him just the second son of a Hall of Famer, after tight end Kellen Winslow II, to be drafted in the first round, the fifth such player ever drafted, and one of two such players drafted in 2008 (the other being Matthew Slater).

Following the draft, Rams head coach Scott Linehan named Long a presumptive starter on defense, a notion that Long rejected and instead felt he needed to earn a spot as a starter. The Rams also announced their plans on using Long as both a linebacker and defensive end to showcase his athleticism. Long considered his ability to play multiple positions one of his best assets.

On July 19, 2008, Long agreed to terms on a six-year $56.5 million contract with the Rams with $29 million guaranteed.

On September 14, 2008, Long recorded his first career sack against Eli Manning of the New York Giants. He recorded his first 2-sack game versus the New England Patriots on October 26, 2008. At the end of his 2008 rookie season he was voted All-Rookie by the Pro Football Writers Association and Sporting News. Long started 16 games (14 at right DE and 2 at left DE) for the Rams in 2008, recording 4 sacks and leading the team in quarterback pressures, with a high of two sacks against the New England Patriots.

In 2009, Long again played both left and right defensive end for the Rams and ended the season with 5 sacks, which was second on the team. He also led the team's defensive linemen with 43 tackles (33 solo plus 10 assists) and for the second straight season he led the Rams in quarterback hits/hurries.

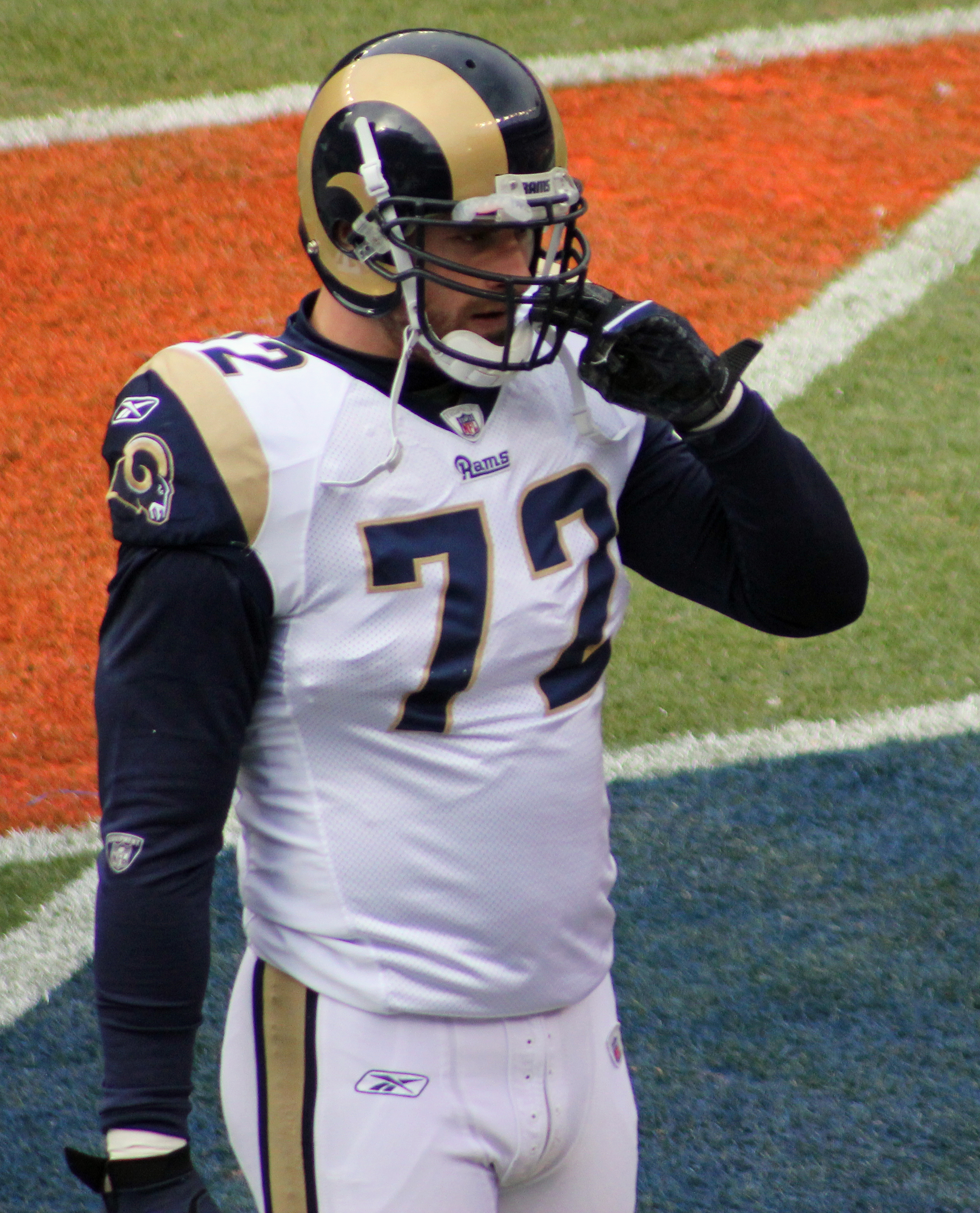
Chris Long at a game in Denver in November 2010.

In 2010, Long moved to left defensive end, a position previously held by Leonard Little, where he is a more "natural fit" according to his coaches. In Week 6, 2010, against the San Diego Chargers, Long recorded two sacks and was named the NFC Defensive Player of the Week by the NFL. Long also helped keep the Chargers to 287 total yards. For the third consecutive season, he led the team in hits/hurries. In addition, he led the NFL in hurries in 2010 with 41.5 and in total quarterback disruptions with 67.5 (Quarterback disruptions are the combined total of quarterback sacks, hits, and hurries) and was named fourth alternate to the Pro Bowl.

In 2011, Chris Long decided to change his jersey number from 72 to his former collegiate number 91, which was previously worn by Leonard Little. On September 17, 2011, the Rams and Long agreed to a restructuring of his contract to free money under the salary cap. The restructured deal included a $12.1 million signing bonus and a base salary in excess of $10 million in 2012. Including the prorated signing bonus amount, Long had an $18.3 million cap number for the 2012 season.

On October 30, 2011, Long had a career-high 3 sacks versus the New Orleans Saints and was named Sports Illustrated's NFC Defensive Player of the Week for his efforts. And for the second consecutive season he led the NFL in quarterback disruptions. Long also led the Rams in quarterback hurries with 15 and quarterback hits with 16. He was voted as an alternate to the Pro Bowl for the second time.

On July 29, 2012, Long and the Rams agreed to a four-year contract extension. The extension added $50 million over 4 years, with $27 million guaranteed. Counting the existing year of contract (2012) which was reworked in 2011, Long's overall deal ended up at $60 million over 5 years, with $37 million guaranteed.

In 2012 Long led the Rams in sacks with 11.5 and again led the team in quarterback hits (24) and hurries (50). Additionally, according to Football Outsiders.com Long led NFL defensive ends in hurries for the third straight season. On December 30, 2012, Long tied a career-high of 3 sacks versus the Seattle Seahawks. He was also voted as a Pro Bowl alternate for the third time.

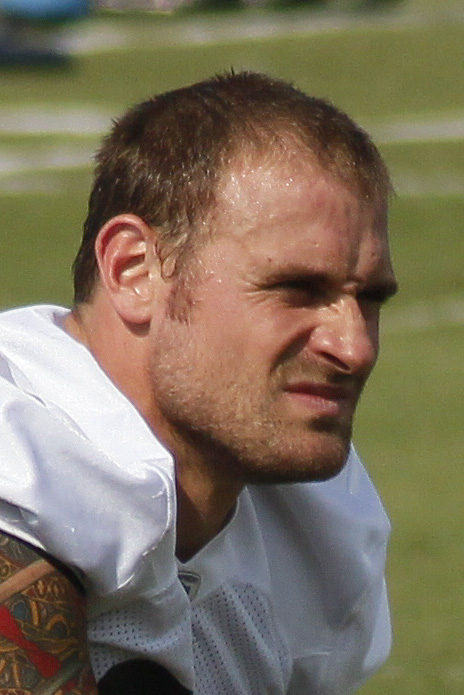
Long with the St. Louis Rams in 2013

On October 24, 2013, Long was ejected and fined $15,750 for throwing a punch at Carolina Panthers guard Chris Scott early in the third quarter. Against the Colts, Long recovered an Andrew Luck fumble and ran it in for a touchdown, his first NFL score, and was named co-NFC Defensive Player of the Week by Sports Illustrated (along with Robert Quinn). Long ended the 2013 season with 8.5 sacks and took his career total to 50.5 sacks and was named to the All-Fundamentals teams for the second consecutive season. Also in 2013 Long was voted first alternate defensive end to the Pro Bowl, the fourth consecutive season he was an alternate. Once again for the sixth consecutive season he led the Rams teams in quarterback pressures with 39, but was second in quarterback hits to All-Pro Robert Quinn.

On September 10, 2014, Rams head coach Jeff Fisher announced Long would spend two months recovering from ankle surgery. The injury reduced Long's 2014 season to six games.

Long played 12 games for the Rams in 2015. He was released by the team on February 19, 2016.

=== New England Patriots ===
On March 18, 2016, Long signed a one-year deal with the New England Patriots worth $2 million. Long appeared in every game, starting in seven, and made solid contributions as a situational player on a team that went on to go 14–2 in the regular season, capture the AFC Championship, and win Super Bowl LI, his first Super Bowl title.

Long played an important role in a critical play helping the team to a dramatic comeback victory. The Patriots trailed 28–3 in the third quarter, but rallied all the way back to win the game by a score of 34–28 against the Atlanta Falcons, which featured the first overtime game in Super Bowl history and the largest comeback in Super Bowl history. Although not appearing in any statistical category during the game, Long played a crucial part in the team's comeback when Falcons offensive tackle Jake Matthews was called for holding Long on an eight-yard catch that would have put the Falcons at the Patriots 26-yard line for a potential game-sealing field goal. Instead, the Falcons were pushed out of field goal range and the Patriots were able to tie the game on their following possession.

=== Philadelphia Eagles ===
On March 28, 2017, his 32nd birthday, Long signed a two-year contract with the Philadelphia Eagles. Long announced that he would donate his entire 2017 salary to charity. Long played in all 16 games in the 2017 season, recording 5 sacks and a career high 4 forced fumbles. He added 4 tackles, 2 pass deflections, and a fumble recovery in 3 postseason games.

Long, along with fellow ex-New England Patriot, LeGarrette Blount, helped the Eagles defeat their former team in Super Bowl LII.

Following the 2018 season, Long was named the recipient of the Walter Payton Man of the Year Award for his efforts regarding clean water, military appreciation and youth education.

=== Retirement ===
After the 2018 season, Long announced his retirement on May 18, 2019.

== Career statistics ==
=== NFL ===
Legend
	Won the Super Bowl
**Bold**	Career high

Year	Team	Games		Tackles				Fumbles			Interceptions					
Year	Team	GP	GS	Cmb	Solo	Ast	Sck	FF	FR	Yds	Int	Yds	Avg	Lng	TD	PD
2008	STL	**16**	**16**	40	32	8	4.0	1	1	0	0	0	0	0	0	0
2009	STL	**16**	4	**43**	**33**	10	5.0	1	0	0	0	0	0	0	0	1
2010	STL	**16**	**16**	29	26	3	8.5	3	1	0	0	0	0	0	0	**3**
2011	STL	**16**	**16**	37	31	6	**13.0**	1	0	0	0	0	0	0	0	2
2012	STL	**16**	**16**	33	25	8	11.5	0	0	0	0	0	0	0	0	0
2013	STL	**16**	**16**	40	**33**	7	8.5	1	**2**	**45**	0	0	0	0	0	2
2014	STL	6	6	5	5	0	1.0	0	1	1	0	0	0	0	0	0
2015	STL	12	5	19	9	10	3.0	1	0	0	0	0	0	0	0	0
2016	NE	**16**	7	35	22	**13**	4.0	1	1	0	0	0	0	0	0	**3**
2017	PHI	**16**	1	28	20	8	5.0	**4**	0	0	0	0	0	0	0	0
2018	PHI	**16**	0	23	15	8	6.5	2	0	0	0	0	0	0	0	0
Career		162	103	329	249	80	70.0	14	6	46	0	0	0	0	0	11

=== College ===
Year	Team	Games		Tackles					Fum & Int					
Year	Team	GP	GS	Cmb	Solo	Ast	TfL	Sck	PD	Int	FF	FR	QBH	TD
2004	Virginia	6	0	5	3	2	2	1.0	0	0	0	0	0	0
2005	Virginia	12	12	46	19	27	10	2.0	7	0	0	0	26	0
2006	Virginia	12	12	57	32	25	12	5.0	1	0	1	0	21	0
2007	Virginia	13	13	69	36	33	19	14.0	9	1	2	1	23	1
Career		43	37	177	90	87	43	22.0	17	1	3	1	70	1

== Career after football ==
Following his football career, Long founded and became the host of the Green Light Podcast. The Green Light Podcast features in-depth interviews with celebrities, musicians and athletes, commentary from Long and his co-hosts, football analysis and sports gambling coverage.

In May 2015, Long launched The Chris Long Foundation, which helps raise money for the Waterboys. ORG Initiative, an effort dedicated to building wells for communities in East Africa. In 2017, Long stated that he would donate his entire season's salary to charity, with the money going to a different cause each week. Long said in a statement: "I hope it won't stop here, but that more people will become inspired to commit energy and resources to our educational system. It will be the number of people invested in this cause that will be the difference maker for a quality education for every student in America. Education is the best gateway to a better tomorrow for EVERYONE in America."

He is currently a panelist on the weekly highlight show Inside the NFL, a role he has held since the show first moved to The CW in 2023.

== Personal life ==
On June 22, 2013, Long married Megan O'Malley in Charlottesville, Virginia. O'Malley is a graduate of the University of Virginia and former member of the UVA women's lacrosse team. The couple have two children; a son born on March 2, 2016, and a second born on November 26, 2018.
