= Matthew Conrath =

American football player (born 1989)

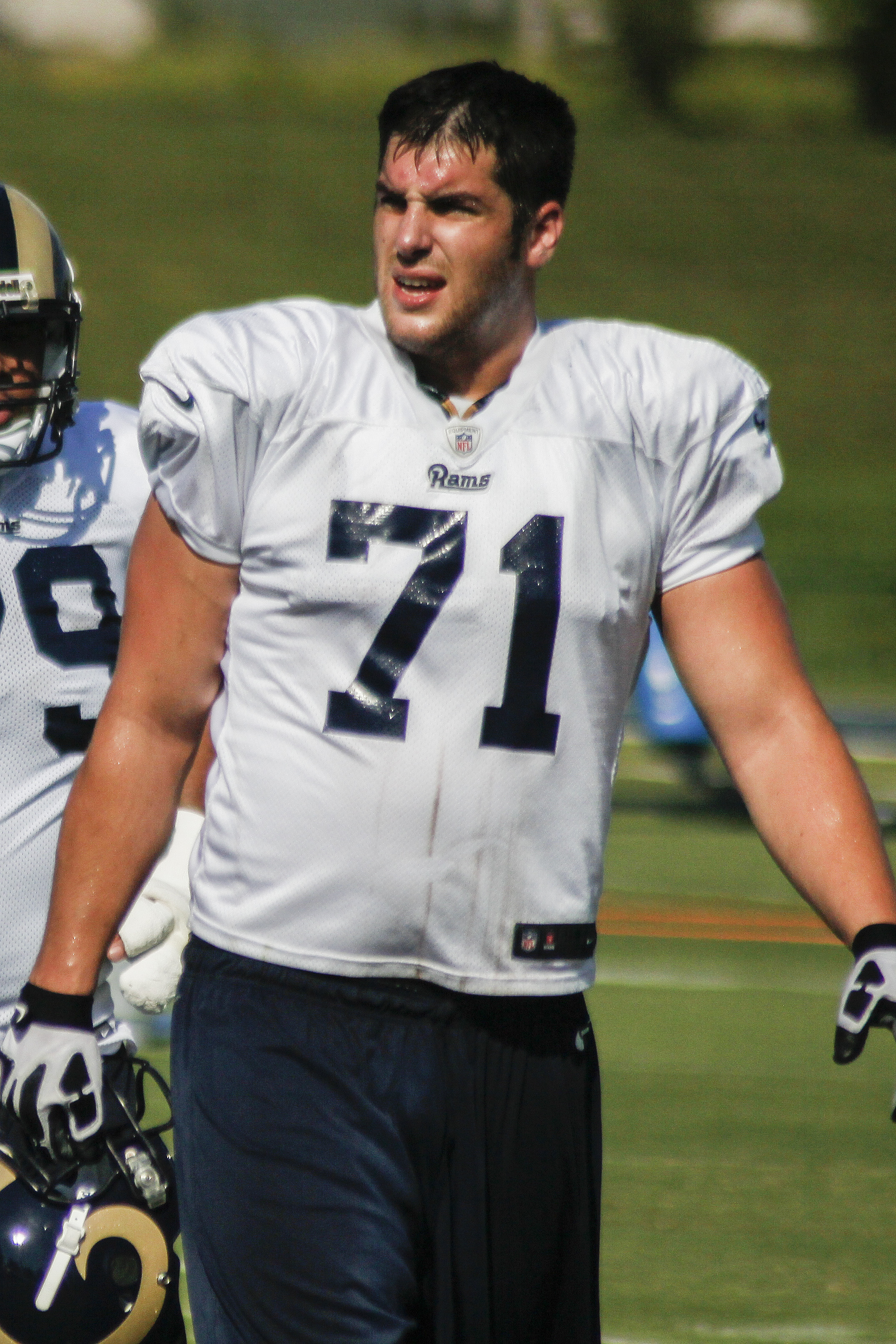
- Conrath at Rams 2013 training camp

No. 71
- Position: Defensive end

Personal information
- Born: August 11, 1989 (age 37); Oak Lawn, Illinois, U.S.
- Listed height: 6 ft 7 in (2.01 m)
- Listed weight: 306 lb (139 kg)

Career information
- High school: St. Rita (Chicago)
- College: Virginia
- NFL draft: 2012: undrafted

Career history
- St. Louis Rams (2012–2014); Pittsburgh Steelers (2015)*
- * Offseason or practice squad member only

Awards and highlights
- First-team All-ACC (2011)

Career NFL statistics
- Games played: 9
- Total tackles: 7
- Sacks: 1
- Stats at Pro Football Reference

Matthew Francis Conrath (born August 11, 1989) is an American former professional football player who was a defensive end in the National Football League (NFL). He played college football for the Virginia Cavaliers. In 2012, he signed with the St. Louis Rams as an undrafted free agent.

== College career ==
He played college football at the University of Virginia. He finished college with a total of 182 tackles, 10.5 sacks, 10 pass deflections and four forced fumbles.

In his freshman season, he registered 35 tackles, three sacks, three pass deflections and a forced fumble.

In his sophomore season, he had 45 tackles along with two sacks and three pass deflections.

In his junior season, he had 36 tackles, 2.5 sacks, one pass deflection and a forced fumble.

In his senior season, he had a career best 66 tackles, three sacks, three pass deflection along with two forced fumbles.

== Professional career ==
=== St. Louis Rams ===
On May 8, 2012, he signed with the St. Louis Rams as an undrafted free agent. He was waived during final cuts on August 30, 2014. He joined the Rams practice squad on August 31, 2014. He was called up to the active roster on September 11, 2014, to replace the injured Chris Long. He was released on September 15, 2014, in response to the impending roster move of bringing the suspended Stedman Bailey back to the active roster. He re-signed with their practice squad shortly after.

=== Pittsburgh Steelers ===
On January 9, 2015, Conrath signed a future/reserve contract with the Pittsburgh Steelers. He was released on September 5, 2015.
