= 2007 Texas Tech Red Raiders football team =

American college football season

2007 Texas Tech Red Raiders football

Gator Bowl champion

Gator Bowl, W 31–28 vs. Virginia
- Conference: Big 12 Conference
- South Division

Ranking
- Coaches: No. 23
- AP: No. 22
- Record: 9–4 (4–4 Big 12)
- Head coach: Mike Leach (8th season)
- Offensive coordinator: Dana Holgorsen (3rd season)
- Offensive scheme: Air raid
- Defensive coordinator: Lyle Setencich (5th season; first 4 games); Ruffin McNeill (interim; remainder of season)
- Base defense: 3–4
- Captains: Danny Amendola; Graham Harrell; Chris Parker; Paul Williams
- Home stadium: Jones AT&T Stadium

2007 Big 12 Conference football standings
	Conf.			Overall
Team	W		L	W		L
North Division
No. 4 Missouri xy	7	–	1	12	–	2
No. 7 Kansas x%	7	–	1	12	–	1
Colorado	4	–	4	6	–	7
Kansas State	3	–	5	5	–	7
Nebraska	2	–	6	5	–	7
Iowa State	2	–	6	3	–	9
South Division
No. 8 Oklahoma xy$	6	–	2	11	–	3
No. 10 Texas	5	–	3	10	–	3
No. 22 Texas Tech	4	–	4	9	–	4
Oklahoma State	4	–	4	7	–	6
Texas A&M	4	–	4	7	–	6
Baylor	0	–	8	3	–	9
Championship: Oklahoma 38, Missouri 17
$ – BCS representative as conference champion; % – BCS at-large representative; x – Division champion/co-champions; y – Championship game participant; Rankings from AP Poll

The 2007 Texas Tech Red Raiders football team represented Texas Tech University as a member of the Big 12 Conference during the 2007 NCAA Division I FBS football season. Led by eighth-year head coach Mike Leach, the Red Raiders compiled an overall record of 9–4 with a mark of 4–4 in conference play, placing in a three-way tie for third in the Big 12's South Division with Texas A&M and Oklahoma State. While all three teams had a matching 4–4 conference record, Tech had a better overall record of 9–4 compared to the Aggies and Cowboys, who both had a record of 7–6. Texas Tech was invited to the Gator Bowl, where they defeated Virginia. The Red Raiders were ranked No. 22 in the final AP Poll and No. 23 in the final Coaches Poll. The team played home games at Jones AT&T Stadium in Lubbock, Texas.

Entering the season, the Red Raiders were predicted to finish fifth in the Big 12 South, ahead of only Baylor.

== Schedule ==
Date	Time	Opponent	Rank	Site	TV	Result	Attendance	Source
September 3	3:00 pm	at SMU*		Gerald J. Ford Stadium; University Park, TX	ESPN	W 49–9	26,969	
September 8	5:00 pm	UTEP*		Jones AT&T Stadium; Lubbock, TX		W 45–31	52,403	
September 15	2:00 pm	at Rice*		Rice Stadium; Houston, TX	FSSW	W 59–24	21,543	
September 22	2:30 pm	at Oklahoma State		Boone Pickens Stadium; Stillwater, OK	FSN	L 45–49	37,850	
September 29	6:00 pm	Northwestern State*		Jones AT&T Stadium; Lubbock, TX		W 75–7	52,893	
October 6	6:00 pm	Iowa State^{†}		Jones AT&T Stadium; Lubbock, TX		W 42–17	46,558	
October 13	2:30 pm	Texas A&M		Jones AT&T Stadium; Lubbock, TX (rivalry)	ABC	W 35–7	55,491	
October 20	2:30 pm	at No. 15 Missouri	No. 22	Faurot Field; Columbia, MO	ABC	L 10–41	63,396	
October 27	11:00 am	Colorado		Jones AT&T Stadium; Lubbock, TX	ABC	L 26–31	49,084	
November 3	2:00 pm	at Baylor		Floyd Casey Stadium; Waco, TX (rivalry)		W 38–7	39,015	
November 10	2:30 pm	at No. 15 Texas		Darrell K Royal–Texas Memorial Stadium; Austin, TX (rivalry)	ABC	L 43–59	86,401	
November 17	7:00 pm	No. 3 Oklahoma		Jones AT&T Stadium; Lubbock, TX	ABC	W 34–27	55,038	
January 1	12:00 pm	vs. No. 21 Virginia		Jacksonville Municipal Stadium; Jacksonville, FL (Gator Bowl)	CBS	W 31–28	60,243	
*Non-conference game; ^{†}Homecoming; Rankings from AP Poll released prior to the game; All times are in Central time

== Game summaries ==
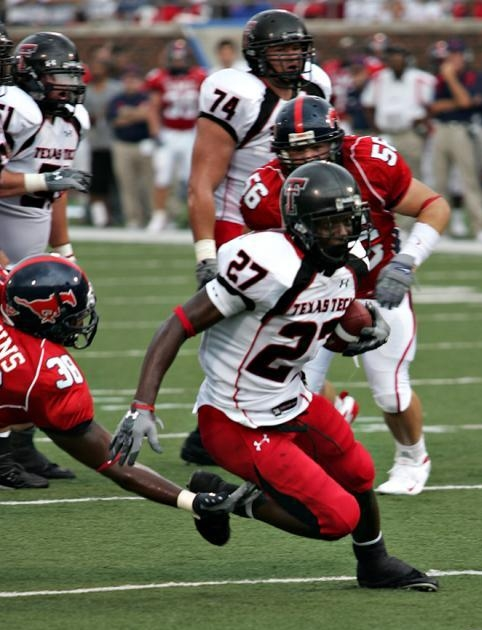
Action during the SMU game

=== SMU ===
	1	2	3	4	Total
Texas Tech	7	14	14	14	49
SMU	3	3	0	3	9

Because Texas Tech went into the game with new starters in key positions on both offense and defense, CollegeFootballNews.com speculated that the SMU Mustangs would come away with an upset win over the Red Raiders. However, Tech scored seven touchdowns while holding SMU to only three field goals and no touchdowns.

The first score of the game came on a one-yard rush by Texas Tech quarterback Graham Harrell. This was followed by a successful point after try by Alex Trlica, who holds the NCAA record for consecutive extra points with no misses. SMU answered with a 36-yard Thomas Morstead field goal.

The Red Raiders scored twice more in the second quarter on passes to Danny Amendola and redshirt freshman Michael Crabtree, both followed by successful point after tries. The Mustangs also scored in the second quarter, a 35-yard field goal by Thomas Morstead. Going into halftime, the score stood at 21–6.

Michael Crabtree also caught both Texas Tech touchdown passes during the third quarter, one for a 42-yard gain and one for a 2-yard gain. Alex Trlica added an extra point after each.

The final quarter of the game saw two more Red Raider touchdowns, the first being a 2-yard rush by Shannon Woods. This was answered by the Mustangs' final score of the game, a 37-yard field goal. After sending in backup quarterback Taylor Potts, Tech scored once more on a 5-yard rushing touchdown by Woods. Trlica again followed with the extra point, extending his PAT record to 173 consecutive conversions without a miss.

=== UTEP ===
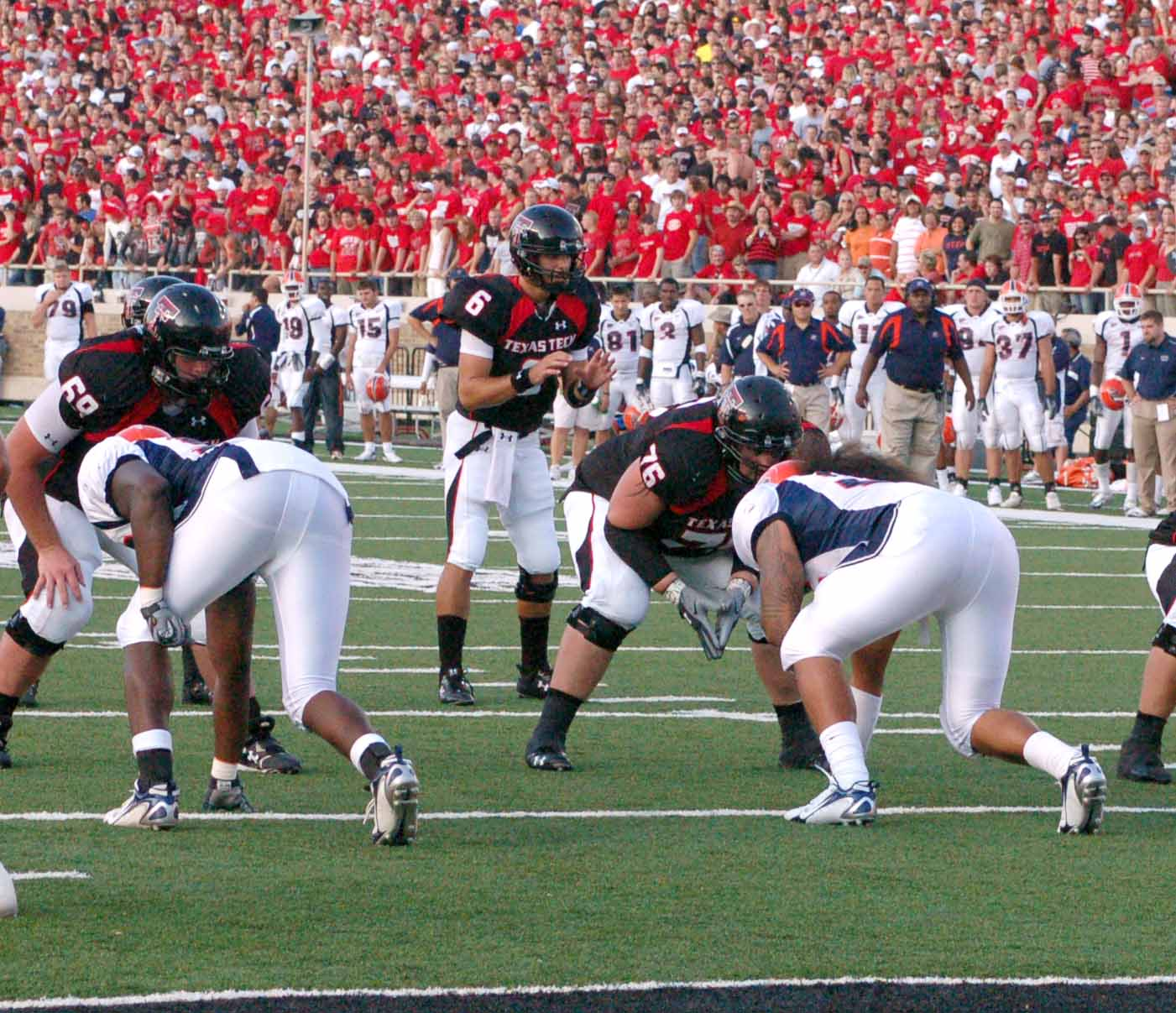
Graham Harrell leads Tech offense against UTEP

	1	2	3	4	Total
UTEP	21	7	3	0	31
Texas Tech	7	10	14	14	45

Texas Tech defeated the University of Texas at El Paso, 45–31. Texas Tech got on the scoreboard first when Kobey Lewis rushed up the middle for a one-yard touchdown with Alex Trlica making the point after.

UTEP answered with an eight-yard pass from Trevor Vittatoe to Jeff Moturi for a touchdown. The Miners successfully made the PAT to tie the game. The next score also came from UTEP, giving them the lead on a 41-yard-pass from Vittatoe to Joe West, followed by a point after. UTEP scored a third time before the end of the first quarter. UTEP running back Marcus Thomas, who sat out the previous game because of a suspension, scored on a one-yard-run. Another successfully PAT followed. This gave the Miners a 21–7 lead going into the second quarter.

In the second quarter, the Red Raiders scored first on a pass from Graham Harrell to Michael Crabtree. The Miner's Thomas made another touchdown, bringing the score to 28–14, UTEP, after the successful PAT. Texas Tech scored a field goal as the first half wound to a close.

In the third quarter, the Red Raiders scored twice. First on a nine-yard touchdown pass from Harrell to Crabtree. Then Harrell threw for another touchdown. Both scores were followed by successful extra points by Alex Trlica. The Miners added three points with a field goal, closing out the quarter with a 31-point tie.

Texas Tech defense held UTEP scoreless in the game's final quarter while the offense added 14. Harrell passed to Grant Walker down the middle for an eight-yard touchdown. The successful PAT made it Texas Tech 38, UTEP 31. On the final score, running back Shannon Woods rushed up the middle for a two-yard-touchdown. Texas Tech made the PAT to close the game out with a 45–31 lead.

=== Rice ===
	1	2	3	4	Total
Texas Tech	14	21	14	10	59
Rice	3	14	0	7	24

Texas Tech won the toss and opted to receive. On their first drive, the Red Raiders scored, getting into the end zone on a pass from Graham Harrell to Shannon Woods for an eleven-yard gain. Alex Trlica made the PAT, extending the NCAA record.

The next score of the game was also by Texas Tech. Harrell passed to Grant Walker down the middle for 38-yards, ending in a touchdown followed by a success point after.

The Owls got onto the scoreboard when Clark Fangmeier kicked a 35-yard field goal. This brought the score to 14–3.

Rice scored again after the beginning of the second quarter. Chase Clement connected with Toren Dixon down the middle for a thirteen-yard gain and the first Owl touchdown of the season. Following the PAT, the score stood at 14–10. The Red Raiders' first score in the second quarter came on a two-yard rush by Shannon Woods, followed by an extra point conversion.

Rice responded with their second TD of the game. Clement passed to Jarett Dillard for a 47-yard gain, followed by a successful PAT, bringing the score to 21–17.

The last 2 scores in the first half were made by Texas Tech. The first was a Harrell pass to Michael Crabtree for a 74-yard gain. The second was another Harrell pass—this time to Eric Morris—for ten yards. Both were followed by successful point after tries by Trlica.

The second half opened with the Red Raiders leading, 35–17. Tech held Rice scoreless in the third quarter while adding 14. Crabtree scored on a nine-yard passing play and Kobey Lewis rushed one-yard for a touchdown. Successful PATs followed both scores.

In the fourth quarter, Texas Tech made their third unanswered touchdown—a 20-yard pass to Crabtree—to bring the score to 56–17. The Owls scored their final touchdown of the game when C. J. Ugokwe rushed up the middle for a seven-yard gain. Fangmeier made the point after.

The Red Raiders were able to score once more after backup quarterback Taylor Potts entered the game. Alex Trlica kicked a 39-yard field goal, making the final score 59–24 in favor of Texas Tech.

=== Oklahoma State ===
	1	2	3	4	Total
Texas Tech	14	21	0	10	45
OSU	7	21	7	14	49

The Red Raiders' road game in Stillwater against the Oklahoma State Cowboys marked the first conference game of the season for both teams. Tech leads the series, 20–12–3. In 2006, Tech beat OSU in Lubbock. However, the Red Raiders have not won in Stillwater since 2001.

The game was an offensive shootout with Oklahoma State scoring 49 points to Texas Tech's 45. The first quarter saw two scores by the Red Raiders—a Graham Harrell pass to Michael Crabtree and a rushing touchdown by Shannon Woods. Between the two Tech scores, the Cowboys' Dantrell Savage rushed four yards for a touchdown. All three TDs were followed by successful point after tries.

After the beginning of the second quarter, Oklahoma State tied the score with a five-yard pass from Zac Robinson to Desmond Bryant, followed by a point after conversion by Jason Ricks. The Cowboys took the lead when Kendall Hunter rushed up the middle for a 46-yard gain followed by a successful PAT.

Another Harrell to Crabtree pass followed by successful PAT by Alex Trlica again tied the score. However, Oklahoma State answered when quarterback Zac Robinson rushed up the middle 48-yards for a TD and Ricks made the point after. The next two scores were made by the Red Raiders—a touchdown pass to Eric Morris and another to Michael Crabtree followed by PATs.

The second half opened with a 35–28 Red Raider lead but the Cowboys tied it when Zac Robinson rushed for a touchdown, followed by successful point after conversion. This marked the only score of the third quarter by either team.

Oklahoma State again took the lead in the final period of play when Seth Newton passed to Jeremy Broadway for a 33-yard gain, followed by successful PAT. The Red Raiders tied it again on a pass from Graham Harrell to Danny Amendola, followed by PAT, and took the lead on a 20-yard Alex Trlica field goal.

The Cowboys pulled ahead with the final score of the game when Zac Robinson passed to Brandon Pettigrew for a touchdown followed by point after conversion. Texas Tech answered with a drive that ended with a failed fourth down conversion when a pass from Harrell to Crabtree was dropped in the end zone.

After the poor defensive showing by the Red Raiders, Tech Defensive Coordinator Lyle Setencich resigned on September 23, 2007, ostensibly for personal reasons. Ruffin McNeill was appointed interim defensive coordinator.

In spite of the loss, Tech's Harrell was honored as AT&T's player of the week for completing 46 of 67 passes for 646 yards and five touchdowns. The recognition took place during halftime of the ESPN college game (Southern Miss at Boise State) on September 27, 2007.

=== Northwestern State ===
	1	2	3	4	Total
NSU (LA)	0	7	0	0	7
Texas Tech	14	24	28	9	75

The Northwestern State Demons were unable to score in the first quarter, but the Texas Tech Red Raiders scored twice. The first was a four-yard rushing touchdown by Shannon Woods. The second was a 34-yard TD pass from Graham Harrell to Michael Crabtree.

Northwestern State's only score came on a touchdown at the opening of the second quarter when Quarterback Germayne Edmond passed to Dudley Guice for an 18-yard gain. Everett Scott made the PAT. Texas Tech scored four touchdowns and a field goal before the half.

The final half of the game saw two more touchdowns before Taylor Potts replaced Graham Harrell in the quarterback position. Potts passed for three touchdowns—two to Detron Lewis and one to Lyle Leong. Additionally, the Red Raiders scored on a safety when a fumble by the Demons bounced out of the back of the end zone in the fourth quarter. All Tech touchdowns in the game were followed by point after conversions by Alex Trlica.

=== Iowa State ===
	1	2	3	4	Total
Iowa State	0	3	0	14	17
Texas Tech	21	7	0	14	42

For homecoming, the Red Raiders faced the Cyclones of Iowa State. While holding ISU scoreless in the first quarter, Texas Tech scored three touchdowns. The first was on a pass from Graham Harrell to Michael Crabtree for a 31-yard gain, the second was on a one-yard rush by Harrell, and the third was on another Harrell to Crabtree pass. All three were followed by successful point after tries by Alex Trlica.

The Red Raiders scored again in the second quarter when a Cyclone fumble was recovered by Darcel McBath who returned it 16 yards for a touchdown. This was followed by a Trlica PAT. ISU's first score of the game came on a 30-yard field goal by Bret Culbertson.

The second half opened with the Red Raiders holding a 28-3 lead. However, neither team was able to score in the third quarter of play.

Tech scored twice more in the final quarter—on a pass from Harrell to Danny Amendola and a pass from Harrell to Crabtree, both followed by PAT. The final two scores of the game were made by the Cyclones. Meyer rushed five yards for a touchdown, followed by Culbertson's PAT. Then, Meyer passed to Todd Blythe for a 38-yard gain, followed by PAT.

On October 11, 2007, AT&T announced that Texas Tech Quarterback Graham Harrell was the AT&T All-America Player of the Week. This marked the second time in three weeks that he was honored with the award.

=== Texas A&M ===
Team	1	2	3	4	Total
Texas A&M	7	0	0	0	7
• Texas Tech	0	21	0	14	35

- Date: October 13
- Location: Jones AT&T Stadium, Lubbock, Texas
- Game start: 2:33 p.m. CST
- Elapsed time: 3:12
- Game attendance: 55,491
- Referee: Tom Walker
- TV announcers (ABC): Ron Franklin (Play-by-play), Ed Cunningham (Color) & Jack Arute (Sideline)

Scoring summary
1	6:57	A&M	Jorvorskie Lane 1-yard run (Matt Szymanski kick)	A&M 7-0
2	12:48	TT	Eric Morris 12-yard pass from Graham Harrell (Alex Trlica kick)	Tied 7-7
2	8:48	TT	Edward Britton 28-yard pass from Graham Harrell (Alex Trlica kick)	TT 14-7
2	0:25	TT	Shannon Woods 1-yard run (Alex Trlica kick)	TT 21-7
4	12:29	TT	Graham Harrell 1-yard run (Alex Trlica kick)	TT 28-7
4	8:29	TT	Danny Amendola 8-yard pass from Graham Harrell (Alex Trlica kick)	TT 35-7

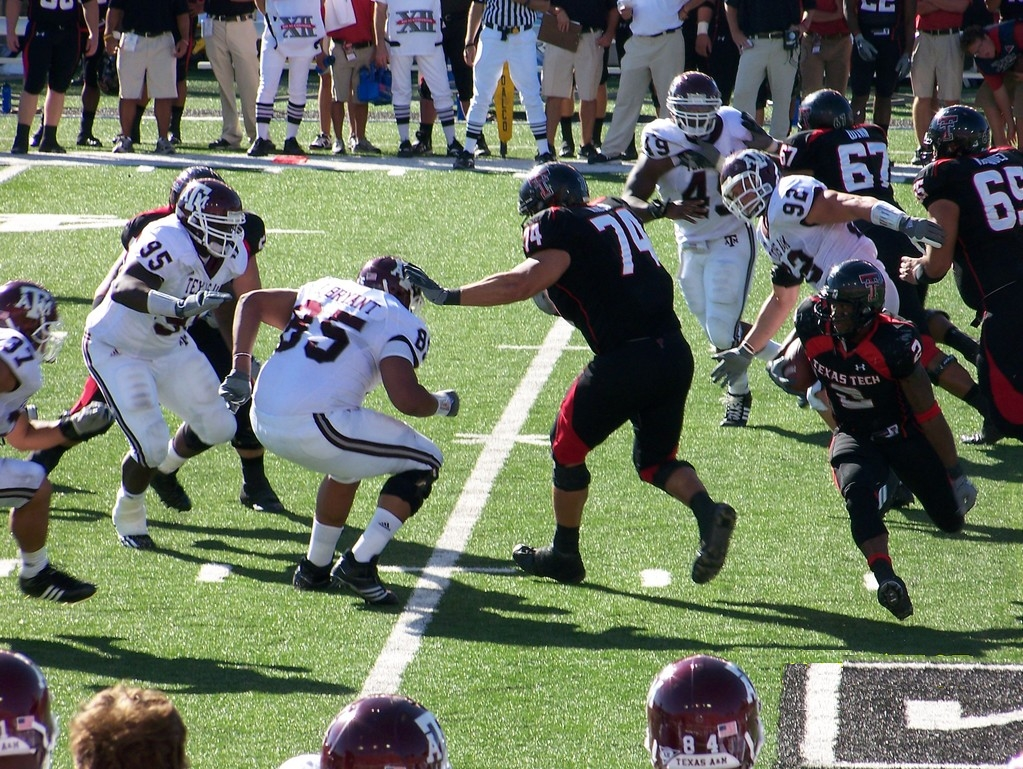
Texas Tech on offense against Texas A&M

This game marked the Red Raiders' 66th meeting with the Aggies. Coming in, A&M led the series 34–30–1, though 1993 was the last time the Aggies won at Jones AT&T Stadium in Lubbock. Coach Dennis Franchione has a 1–3 record with Texas Tech as A&M head coach, and Tech coach Mike Leach has a 5–2 record with A&M as Tech head coach. In their previous meeting, the Raiders outscored the Aggies 31–27, after Tech redshirt sophomore quarterback Graham Harrell made a 37-yard touchdown pass with 26 seconds left in the game.

Texas A&M's only score came in the first quarter when Jorvorskie Lane rushed into the end zone on a one-yard gain. This was followed by a successful point after try by Matt Szymanski. Texas Tech was held scoreless in the quarter.

The Red Raiders were able to score three times in the second quarter. Graham Harrell passed to Eric Morris for a 13-yard touchdown. Later in the quarter, Harrell passed to Edward Britton for a 28-yard TD. The last TD was on a 2-yard rush by Shannon Woods. All three were followed by Alex Trlica point after conversions. Going into the half, Tech led 21–7.

Neither team scored in the third period of play, but the Red Raiders did add two more touchdowns in the final quarter. The first was a rushing touchdown by Harrell. The second was a Harrell-to-Amendola pass for an eight-yard gain. These were followed by PATs bringing the final score to 35–7 in favor of Texas Tech.

=== Missouri ===
	1	2	3	4	Total
Texas Tech	0	10	0	0	10
#17 Missouri	10	7	7	17	41

Coming into the game, the Missouri Tigers were ranked 17th in the Coaches Poll and the Texas Tech Red Raiders were ranked 21st.

The only two scores during the first quarter were made by the Tigers. First, a pass by Tech quarterback Graham Harrell was tipped resulting in an interception by Stryker Sulak who returned it 37 yards for a touchdown. This was followed by a successful point after try by Jeff Wolfert. Later in the quarter, Wolfert kicked a field goal.

The Red Raiders scored twice in the second quarter. A Harrell pass to Edward Britton resulted in a 67-yard touchdown. Alex Trlica made the PAT. Trlica kicked a 45-yard field goal later in the quarter. These would be the only times Tech scored during the game. Missouri scored a touchdown during the quarter when Jimmy Jackson rushed up the middle for a one-yard gain, followed by Wolfert PAT. The score at the half stood at 17–10 in favor of the Tigers.

Missouri's Jackson scored two more rushing touchdowns in the second half, both followed by successful point after conversions by Wolfert. A pass by Chase Daniel to Jeremy Maclin resulted in a touchdown followed by Wolfert PAT. The last score of the game was a 39-yard Wolfert field goal.

=== Colorado ===
	1	2	3	4	Total
Colorado	7	7	17	0	31
Texas Tech	0	6	13	7	26

The Colorado Buffaloes scored twice—a touchdown in the first quarter and another in the second—before the Red Raiders put points on the board with two Alex Trlica field goals. Both of Colorado's scores were followed by successful point after tries by Kevin Eberhart. The score at the half stood at 14–6 in favor of the Buffaloes.

Colorado scored twice more in the beginning of the third quarter. The first was a field goal by Eberhart. The second was a 42-yard touchdown run by Jordan Dixon after he intercepted a Graham Harrell pass. The TD was followed by an Eberhart PAT. Tech answered with a five-play, 80-yard drive that ended with a touchdown pass from Harrell to Eric Morris, followed by Trlica PAT.

Both teams scored once more in the third quarter. The Buffaloes made a touchdown followed by PAT. The Red Raiders made a touchdown followed by a failed two-point conversion try.

Tech was the only team to score in the final quarter. Graham Harrell passed to Edward Britton for a touchdown. Alex Trlica followed it with a PAT. However, it would not be enough to overcome a Colorado lead created, in part, by four interceptions thrown by Harrell.

=== Baylor ===
	1	2	3	4	Total
Texas Tech	14	3	21	0	38
Baylor	0	0	0	7	7

Coming into the game, the series between Texas Tech and Baylor was tied at 32–32–1 with Tech winning the last eleven straight. A victory by the Red Raiders gave them the series lead.

Tech scored two touchdowns in the opening quarter. The first was on a Graham Harrell pass to Eric Morris for a 37-yard gain. The second was on a three-yard rush by Aaron Crawford. Both were followed by extra points by Alex Trlica. The Red Raiders scored again in the second quarter when Trlica kicked a 23-yard field goal. The score at the half stood at 17–0.

In the third quarter, all three of Tech's touchdowns were at the hands of Crawford. First, he caught a pass from Harrell. The second was a rushing TD and the third was on another pass from Harrell. All were followed by Trlica PATs.

The Baylor Bears made the only score in the final quarter when Blake Szymanski passed to Brandon Whitaker for a touchdown. This was followed by a point-after kick by Caleb Allen.

=== Texas ===
	1	2	3	4	Total
Texas Tech	3	17	0	23	43
#14 Texas	14	14	7	24	59

The series with the Texas Longhorns began in 1928 and Tech's record was 14-42–0 coming into this year's game. In the 2006 contest, fifth-ranked Texas barely came away with a 35–31 win over an unranked Texas Tech team. Two days before the 2007 game, oddsmakers favored Texas to win by 6½ points.

Texas center Dallas Griffin was determined to be out for the season due to injuring his anterior cruciate ligament against Oklahoma State the week before the Texas Tech game. Backup defensive end Eddie Jones and reserve safety Drew Kelson also missed the game, while linebackers Jared Norton and Sergio Kindle were listed as "questionable" and "probable", respectively. The Austin American-Statesman reported, "Defensively, Texas must hope that the injured are quick healers because it's a given that the Longhorns will need every available body against the Red Raiders. Texas Tech fields the most dynamic passing offense in the country, and the Red Raiders also stay on the field an average of 77.3 plays per game. Tech further frustrates a defense by often going for fourth downs. They've been successful on 14 of 23 fourth-down attempts this season. A year ago, Tech was one of three on fourth downs in a 35-31 loss to Texas."

On the first series, the Horns scored a touchdown on a pass from McCoy to Shipley. Their defense held Tech to a field goal. Texas' offensive tackle Tony Hills injured his leg and left the game on a cart. Texas scored another touchdown on a run by Vondrell McGee to create a 14–3 lead at the end of the first quarter. Tech's Graham Harrell threw a touchdown pass and Texas answered with a rushing touchdown. On the ensuing kick, Texas used a pooch kick which was tipped by a Texas Tech player. The Longhorns' special team recovered the ball to set up a short field for their offense to rush for another touchdown. Tech brought the game to 28–20 with another touchdown. Texas drove into field goal range but tried to throw a touchdown pass with 11 seconds remaining in the half. The pass was intercepted for a touchback and the Red Raiders ran a short play to run out the half.

Jamaal Charles and tight end Jermichael Finley were injured in the second half but were able to return. In the fourth quarter, McCoy was on the sidelines nursing a cut on his head but he did not miss any snaps due to the injury. McCoy threw for four touchdowns and ran for two more. Both teams kept running their first team offense until late in the game; they combined for 47 points in the final 12 minutes and each scored a touchdown within the final two minutes of play. Tech attempted two onside kicks in an effort to come from behind, but Texas recovered both kicks.

During his post-game press conference, Texas Tech's Mike Leach used most of his time to rail against the officiating crew for making what he felt were bad calls. He speculated that the officials may have favored Texas because the head official lives in Austin, because they are incompetent, or possibly because the conference wants Texas to appear in a BCS bowl because of the increased appearance fees that such a bowl generates for the conference. Jim Vertuno of the Associated Press wrote "Leach was upset officials disallowed two Tech touchdowns in the third quarter. The first was overruled when video replay clearly showed the receiver let the ball hit the ground. On the next play, a touchdown pass was negated by a holding penalty. Leach also wanted, but didn't get, a flag for roughing the quarterback." The Lubbock Avalanche-Journal reported, "Big 12 policy prohibits coaches from commenting publicly about game officials, so Leach's actions leave him open to reprimand, fine or worse." ESPN reported, "Big 12 official spokesman Bob Burda did not immediately respond to telephone messages seeking comment. Leach's rant will likely draw a fine from the league and possibly a suspension."

On November 13, 2007, the Big 12 fined Leach US$10,000, the largest fine in Big 12 history. Leach also received a reprimand and was warned that further violations can result in suspension. In a Big 12 coaches' conference call that day, Leach added that he did not regret making any of the comments. Leach announced that he will appeal the fine.

Tech alumni and fans began raising money to aid Leach in paying the penalty in the event that it was upheld. Optionally, the proceeds raised could be used charitably. So, just before Christmas 2008, Leach requested that the nearly $5,000 raised to that point be spent on 400 hams to be given free to families in Lubbock. Future donations were to go to the university or athletic department.

=== Oklahoma ===
#3 Oklahoma at Texas Tech

Team	1	2	3	4	Total
Oklahoma	7	3	3	14	27
• Texas Tech	13	14	7	0	34

- Date: November 17
- Location: Jones AT&T Stadium, Lubbock, Texas
- Game start: 7:12 p.m. CST
- Elapsed time: 4:03
- Game attendance: 55,038
- Referee: Jon Bible
- TV announcers (ABC): Brad Nessler (Play-by-play), Bob Griese (Color), Paul Maguire (Color) & Bonnie Bernstein (Sideline)

Scoring summary
1	13:25	OU	Lendy Holmes 63-yard interception return (Garrett Hartley kick)	OU 7-0
1	12:07	TT	Alex Trlica 51-yard field goal	OU 7-3
1	6:42	TT	Alex Trlica 38-yard field goal	OU 7-6
1	5:10	TT	Graham Harrell 1-yard run (Alex Trlica kick)	TT 13-7
2	12:18	TT	Michael Crabtree 13-yard pass from Graham Harrell (Alex Trlica kick)	TT 20-7
2	9:18	TT	Eric Morris 15-yard pass from Graham Harrell (Alex Trlica kick)	TT 27-7
2	0:19	OU	Garrett Hartley 20-yard field goal	TT 27-10
3	12:25	TT	Aaron Crawford 3-yard run (Alex Trlica kick)	TT 34-10
3	7:04	OU	Garrett Hartley 33-yard field goal	TT 34-13
4	7:50	OU	Manuel Johnson 65-yard pass from Joey Halzle (Garrett Hartley kick)	TT 34-20
4	0:31	OU	Manuel Johnson 9-yard pass from Joey Halzle (Garrett Hartley kick)	TT 34-27

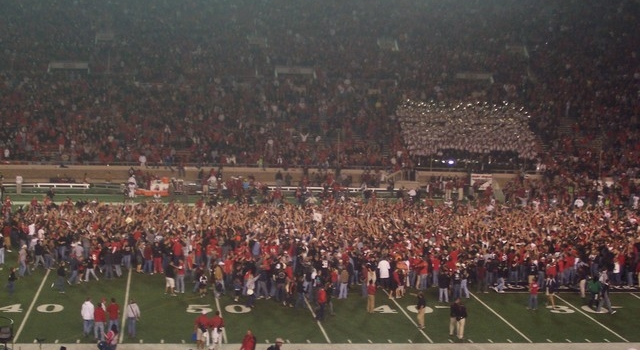
Texas Tech fans rush the field after the unranked Red Raiders upset the #3 Sooners.

In the final regular season game for Texas Tech and final regular season road game for Oklahoma, the Sooners traveled to Lubbock. Oklahoma had led the series 11–3 since the first game was played in 1992.

ABC broadcast the game live to the entire country. Previous games carried by ABC during the season were shown to only a portion of the market. This was the largest single-viewed game since Mike Leach began coaching at Tech.

After starting at their own 20 yard line, Tech's quarterback Graham Harrell completed four straight passes to bring them to midfield. On the fifth play, Harrell's pass was intercepted by Lendy Holmes and returned for a touchdown giving Oklahoma the early lead. The Red Raiders answered on their next two possessions with two field goals to cut Oklahoma's lead to one point. On the Sooners' first offensive play, quarterback Sam Bradford handed the ball off to Allen Patrick who quickly fumbled. Bradford suffered a concussion when he tackled the Tech defender who recovered the lost ball. Bradford did not show any immediate signs as he played on the ensuing Oklahoma possession, but he later told quarterbacks coach Josh Heupel that he did not remember any of the plays from the previous drive and Bradford was benched for the remainder of the game. Bradford was replaced by backup Joey Halzle.

Texas Tech scored a touchdown on each of their next three possessions. Late in the second quarter, the Red Raiders fumbled the ball and it was recovered by Oklahoma. Oklahoma was unable to score a touchdown but managed a field goal with less than ten seconds remaining in the first half. Tech went into halftime with a 27–10 lead.

To begin the third quarter, the Sooners went three-and-out and the Red Raiders answered with another touchdown. On Oklahoma's next possession, they ran six rushing plays against three passing plays and managed another field goal. Tech missed a 51-yard field goal on their next possession. The two teams traded possessions for the remainder of the third quarter. The Sooners went three-and-out, the Red Raiders got a first down on the first play, then went three-and-out. Tech intercepted Halzle on the next possession and Oklahoma responded with their own interception on the following play.

In the fourth quarter, Oklahoma began to chip away at Tech's lead. Halzle completed a 65-yard touchdown pass to Manuel Johnson with less than eight minutes remaining to make it a two-possession game. Oklahoma got to the Tech seven yard line on their next possession but failed to convert. On the following possession, they got to the Tech 14 yard line but again failed to convert. With less than a minute left in the game, Halzle completed a 47-yard pass to Juaquin Iglesias that set up a nine-yard touchdown pass to Johnson to bring the Sooners within seven points. The Sooners attempted an onside kick with 20 seconds remaining but Tech got the ball and ran out the clock.

The Red Raiders were ranked 24th in the coaches' poll released the day following the game.

=== Virginia (Gator Bowl) ===
	1	2	3	4	Total
Texas Tech	7	0	7	17	31
#20 Virginia	9	12	0	7	28

Texas Tech jumped out to an early 7–0 lead on a ten-yard touchdown pass from Graham Harrell on the Raiders' second possession of the game. Virginia answered by scoring 21 unanswered points, including two safeties when Harrell was called for intentional grounding in the endzone. Cavaliers' tailback Mikell Simpson also scored on a 96-yard run, setting an NCAA bowl record for a running back. The halftime score stood at 21–7.

Tech scored a touchdown in the third quarter but did not allow any points, narrowing Virginia's lead to a single touchdown. However, Simpson caught an eleven-yard pass from quarterback Peter Lalich with 11:26 left in the game to make the score 28–14.

With 7:54 left in the game, Texas Tech turned the ball over on downs just outside Virginia's goal line. The Cavaliers were unable to pick up a first down and, following a punt, the Red Raiders took over at midfield trailing by 14 with 5:32 left. Harrell engineered an efficient drive completing five of his eight passes on the drive, including a 20-yard fade to Michael Crabtree for a touchdown to make it 28–21 with 3:31 left on the clock.

On Virginia's ensuing drive, Lalich was sacked and fumbled the football, setting up a one-play drive for Texas Tech—a four-yard touchdown run for Aaron Crawford. Virginia was again unable to pick up a first down and Texas Tech drove to the UVA 24-yard line, kicking the winning 41-yard field goal with two seconds left. The final score was Texas Tech 31, Virginia 28.

Earlier in the season, Tech's head coach Mike Leach had been fined US$10,000 for criticizing the officiating during the game at Texas. Fans contributed nearly $5,000 to help pay it and the money was spent to give free Christmas hams to Lubbock families. So following the Gator Bowl, he joked when referring to the two penalties assessed against his team for intentional grounding in the end zone, "I felt like we had a back there on the one safety, but I don't comment on officiating. I just give out hams is what I do."

After the loss, the Cavaliers fell from the top twenty-five rankings. Meanwhile, the Red Raiders finished the season ranked 22nd in the AP Poll and 23rd in the Coaches Poll.

== Roster ==
2007 Texas Tech Red Raiders football team roster
Players
Coaches
Offense

Pos.	#	Name	Class
QB	6	Graham Harrell	Jr
RB	36	Gerardo Acevedo	Fr
RB	25	Baron Batch	Fr
WR	88	Brik Brikner	Fr
WR	27	Edward Britton	So
WR	5	Michael Crabtree	Fr
WR	12	Eric Morris	Jr
WR	17	Detron Lewis	Fr
OL	63	Landon Burge	Fr
C	51	Shawn Byrnes	So
OL	76	Brandon Carter	So

Defense

Pos.	#	Name	Class
DB	3	Jamar Wall	So

Special teams

Pos.	#	Name	Class
K	30	Alex Trlica	Sr

Head coach

- Mike Leach

Coordinators/assistant coaches

Legend

- (C) Team captain
- (S) Suspended
- (I) Ineligible
- Injured
- Redshirt

== Statistics ==
- QB Graham Harrell: 512/713 (71.8%) for 5,705 yards and 48 TD vs. 14 INT. 38 carries for -91 yards and 4 TD.
- RB Shannon Woods: 84 carries for 439 yards and 8 TD. 34 catches for 138 yards and 2 TD.
- RB Aaron Crawford: 54 carries for 214 yards and 4 TD. 38 catches for 246 yards and 2 TD.
- RB Kobey Lewis: 50 carries for 189 yards and 2 TD. 24 catches for 178 yards and 0 TD.
- WR Michael Crabtree: 134 catches for 1,962 yards and 22 TD.
- WR Danny Amendola: 109 catches for 1,245 yards and 6 TD.
- WR Eric Morris: 75 catches for 767 yards and 9 TD.
- WR Edward Britton: 48 catches for 631 yards and 4 TD.
- WR Grant Walker: 30 catches for 353 yards and 2 TD.
- WR L.A. Reed: 16 catches for 189 yards and 0 TD.
- WR Lyle Leong: 15 catches for 174 yards and 1 TD.
- WR Detron Lewis: 10 catches for 120 yards and 3 TD.

== Awards and honors ==
- Michael Crabtree, Fred Biletnikoff Award
- Graham Harrell, Sammy Baugh Trophy
