= 2008 Gator Bowl =

2008 Konica Minolta Gator Bowl
- 63rd Gator Bowl
Texas Tech Red Raiders	Virginia Cavaliers
(8–4)	(9–3)
Big 12	ACC
31	28
Head coach: Mike Leach	Head coach: Al Groh
	AP / Coaches / BCS; 21 / 20 / 20
	1	2	3	4	Total
Texas Tech	7	0	7	17	31
Virginia	9	12	0	7	28
- Date: January 1, 2008
- Season: 2007
- Stadium: Jacksonville Municipal Stadium
- Location: Jacksonville, Florida
- MVP: Graham Harrell (QB, Texas Tech) & Mikell Simpson (RB, Virginia) (Note: The bowl's official website lists DE Chris Long as Virginia's MVP.)
- Favorite: Texas Tech by 5½
- Referee: John O'Neill (Big Ten)
- Attendance: 60,243
- Payout: US$2.5 million per team

United States TV coverage
- Network: CBS
- Announcers: Verne Lundquist, Gary Danielson, and Tracy Wolfson

The 2008 Gator Bowl was played on January 1, 2008, as part of the 2007 NCAA Division I FBS football season. It featured the Red Raiders of Texas Tech University, who finished third in the Big 12 Conference's South Division, and the Cavaliers of the University of Virginia, who finished second in the Atlantic Coast Conference's Coastal Division. Texas Tech won the game on a last-second field goal, securing a 31–28 victory.

It was one of 32 games in the 2007–08 bowl season. The Gator Bowl is an annual college football bowl game that is played at Jacksonville Municipal Stadium in Jacksonville, Florida. It is one of the oldest college bowls, held continuously since 1946. This edition's full name was the Konica Minolta Gator Bowl after its sponsor, Konica Minolta.

== Overview ==
The Gator Bowl has tie-ins from the Atlantic Coast Conference (ACC), Big 12 Conference, and Big East Conferences, as well as independent Notre Dame. They have the right to the third pick of a team from the ACC, and have the option to offer the other spot to the second pick from the Big East, the fourth pick from the Big 12, or Notre Dame. The 2008 game featured the ACC's Virginia Cavaliers, who finished the 2007 season with an overall record of 9–3 (6–2 in the ACC) playing the Big 12's Texas Tech Red Raiders, who finished the 2007 season with an overall record of 8–4 (4–4 in the Big 12). The game was the eighth straight post season appearance for the Red Raiders. Virginia returned to a bowl game after failing to qualify for one following the 2006 season.

== Recap ==
After Texas Tech jumped out to an early 7–0 lead, scoring on their second drive with a 10-yard touchdown pass from Graham Harrell to Detron Lewis, Virginia reeled off 21 straight points, including two safeties where Harrell was called for intentional grounding in the endzone. Virginia tailback Mikell Simpson scored on a 96-yard run, an NCAA bowl record for a running back.

Virginia carried a 21–7 lead into the locker room at halftime and seemed to be in control after Simpson hauled in an 11-yard pass from quarterback Peter Lalich with 11:26 left in the game to make the score 28–14.

With 7:54 left in the game, Texas Tech turned the ball over on downs just outside Virginia's goal line. The Cavaliers were unable to pick up a first down and, following a punt, the Red Raiders took over at midfield trailing by 14 with 5:32 left. Harrell engineered an efficient drive completing five of his eight passes on the drive, including a 20-yard fade to Michael Crabtree for a touchdown to make it 28–21 with 3:31 left on the clock.

On Virginia's ensuing drive, Lalich was sacked and fumbled the football, setting up a one-play drive for Texas Tech – a four-yard touchdown run for Aaron Crawford.

Virginia was again unable to pick up a first down and Texas Tech drove to the UVA 24 yard line and Alex Trlica kicked the winning 41-yard field goal with two seconds left. The final score was Texas Tech 31, Virginia 28.
