= Mikell Simpson =

American football player (born 1985)

Profile
- Position: Running back

Personal information
- Born: September 19, 1985 (age 41); Harrisburg, Pennsylvania, U.S.
- Listed height: 6 ft 1 in (1.85 m)
- Listed weight: 200 lb (91 kg)

Career information
- High school: Harrisburg High School
- College: Virginia (2006–2009)

Awards and highlights
- Stats at ESPN

Mikell V. Simpson (born September 19, 1985) is an American former college football player who was a running back for the Virginia Cavaliers of the University of Virginia.

== Early life ==
Simpson was born in Harrisburg, Pennsylvania, to John Culp. He attended the Harrisburg High School. As a junior, he had 88 carries for 862 yards and 21 touchdowns, and as a senior, had 51 carries for 456 rushing yards and eight touchdowns. Simpson also made 23 receptions for 520 yards, and five touchdowns and five interceptions. He was named a SuperPrep All-American.

He received college scholarship offers from Virginia, Alabama, Florida, Michigan State, North Carolina and UCLA.

== College career ==
At Virginia in 2005, Simpson sat out as a redshirt. In 2006, he saw action in six games.

In 2007, Simpson recorded 570 rushing yards, 402 receiving yards, and ten touchdowns. He was the second-leading rusher on the Virginia team. During the summer training camp, he was converted from a tailback to wide receiver. He saw little action in the first half of the season, and by Week 7 had made just four receptions for 31 yards. Before the Maryland game, Simpson was moved back to tailback. In that game, he rushed for 119 yards and two touchdowns and caught 13 passes for 152 yards, making him the sixth player in Atlantic Coast Conference (ACC) history to record 100 yards both rushing and receiving in a single game. In the final minutes of play, Virginia made a 90-yard drive, with Simpson making touches on 14 out of 15 of those plays. It culminated with a one-yard Simpson rush for the game-winning touchdown. For his performance against Maryland, he was named the ACC Offensive Back of the Week. In the 2008 Gator Bowl loss to Texas Tech, Simpson had 170 rushing yards on 20 carries, including a 96-yard touchdown run. It marked the longest rush in Virginia school history, the second-longest rush in NCAA bowl game history, the longest rush by any Division I player during the 2007 season, and the longest rush in an NCAA bowl game by a running back. For his performance, Simpson was named Gator Bowl Most Valuable Player alongside Texas Tech quarterback Graham Harrell.

In 2008, Simpson was again the second-leading rusher, behind Cedric Peerman. He played in nine games, recording 87 carries for 262 yards and three touchdowns, and 15 receptions for 66 yards. Simpson suffered a season-ending shoulder injury against Miami.
