= Jared Green =

American football player (born 1989)

No. 10, 85, 16
- Position: Wide receiver

Personal information
- Born: April 1, 1989 (age 37); Vienna, Virginia, U.S.
- Listed height: 6 ft 1 in (1.85 m)
- Listed weight: 186 lb (84 kg)

Career information
- High school: Oakton (Vienna, Virginia)
- College: Virginia (2007–2010); Southern (2011)
- NFL draft: 2012: undrafted

Career history
- Carolina Panthers (2012)*; Dallas Cowboys (2013)*; Oakland Raiders (2013–2014)*
- * Offseason or practice squad member only
- Stats at Pro Football Reference

Jared Green (born April 1, 1989) is an American former football wide receiver in the National Football League (NFL). He played college football for the Virginia Cavaliers and for the Southern Jaguars, and signed with the Carolina Panthers as an undrafted free agent in 2012. He had brief stints with the Panthers, the Dallas Cowboys and the Oakland Raiders, before retiring from professional football in 2014 to pursue his business and philanthropic dreams. He is the founder and CEO of Engage and sits on various boards. His nonprofit work in Washington, DC remains his passion.

== Early life ==
Green was born in Vienna, Virginia, on April 1, 1989, and has an older sister, Jerrell, and a younger sister, Joi. He attended Oakton High School in Vienna, Virginia.

== College career ==
Green played college football at the University of Virginia from 2008 to 2010. He transferred from Virginia to Southern University for his senior year and the 2011 football season. He finished his college career with 52 receptions, 670 receiving yards and four receiving touchdowns.

In his freshman year at Virginia, Green played in 12 games had 12 receptions, 144 receiving yards and one receiving touchdown. On November 1, 2008, he had three receptions for 25 yards and a touchdown against Miami in which Virginia lost the game in Overtime 24–17.

In his sophomore year, he played in 11 games in which he recorded 15 receptions, 104 receiving yards and no touchdowns. On September 5, 2009, he had three receptions for 28 yards in a loss against William & Mary. On September 19, 2009, he had 4 receptions for 18 yards in a loss against Southern Mississippi.

In his junior year, he played in 11 games and recorded 8 receptions, 95 receiving yards and one receiving touchdown. On September 25, 2010, he recorded four receptions for 63 yards and a touchdown against Virginia Military Institute, in a 48–7 win.

In his senior year at Southern, he played in 11 games and started in three of them. He finished the season with 17 receptions, 307 receiving yards and two receiving touchdowns. On October 15, 2011, he had a career-high 7 receptions, career high 141 receiving yards and one touchdown against Arkansas-Pine Bluff but Southern lost 22–21.

== Professional career ==
Pre-draft measurables
Height	Weight	40-yard dash	10-yard split	20-yard split	20-yard shuttle	Three-cone drill	Vertical jump	Broad jump	Bench press
6 ft 1 1/8 in (1.86 m)	191 lb (87 kg)	4.28 s	1.50 s	2.53 s	4.39 s	6.96 s	35.0 in (0.89 m)	10 ft 9 in (3.28 m)	3 reps
All values from Pro Day

=== Carolina Panthers ===
Green went undrafted in the 2012 NFL draft. On May 11, 2012, he signed with Carolina Panthers as an undrafted free agent. On August 31, 2012, he was released. On September 1, 2012, he was re-signed to the practice squad.

=== Dallas Cowboys ===
On January 7, 2013, Green signed with the Dallas Cowboys to a future/reserve contract. He was released on August 26.

=== Oakland Raiders ===
Green was signed to the Oakland Raiders practice squad on December 12, 2013. On December 30, the Raiders signed him to a futures contract. On June 5, 2014, Green decided to retire from football.

== Personal life ==
He is the son of Hall of Fame cornerback Darrell Green who played his entire career with the Washington Redskins. He presented his father for induction to the Hall of Fame in Canton in 2008. He is married to his wife Joanna and they have four daughters together.
