= Al Groh =

American football coach

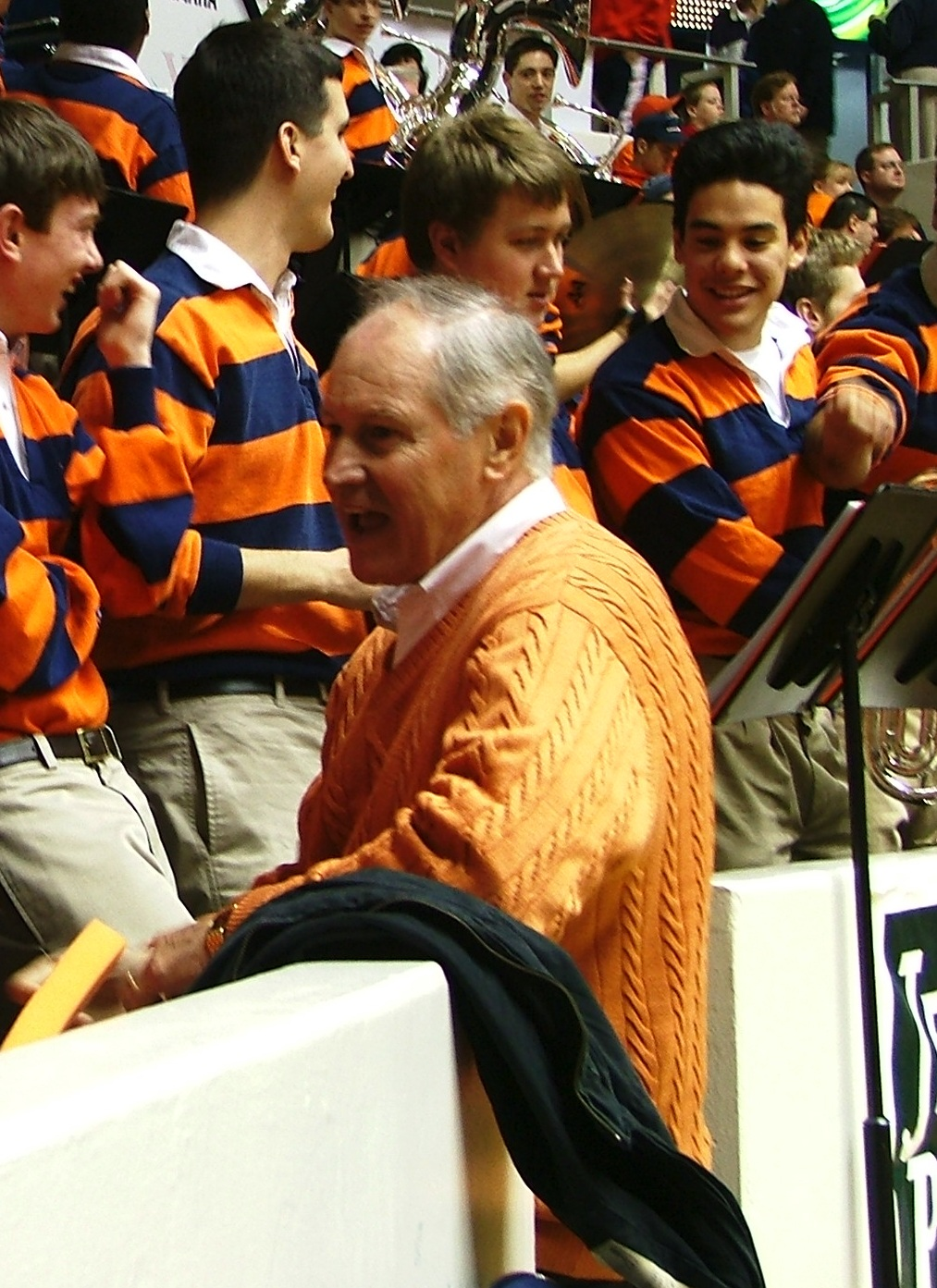
- Groh at a UVA basketball game, 2006.

Biographical details
- Born: July 13, 1944 (age 82); New York City, New York, U.S.

Playing career
- 1963–1965: Virginia
- Position: Defensive end

Coaching career (HC unless noted)
- 1967: Albemarle HS (OC)
- 1968–1969: Army (freshman DC)
- 1970: Virginia (freshmen)
- 1971–1972: Virginia (DL)
- 1973–1977: North Carolina (LB)
- 1978–1979: Air Force (DC)
- 1980: Texas Tech (LB)
- 1981–1986: Wake Forest
- 1987: Atlanta Falcons (TE/ST)
- 1988: South Carolina (OC)
- 1989–1990: New York Giants (LB)
- 1991: New York Giants (DC)
- 1992: Cleveland Browns (LB)
- 1993–1996: New England Patriots (DC/LB)
- 1997–1999: New York Jets (LB)
- 2000: New York Jets
- 2001–2009: Virginia
- 2010–2012: Georgia Tech (DC)

Head coaching record
- Overall: 85–93 (college); 9–7 (NFL)
- Bowls: 3–2

Accomplishments and honors

Awards
- 2× ACC Coach of the Year (2002, 2007)

Albert Michael Groh II (born July 13, 1944) is an American former football coach and player. He served as the head football coach at Wake Forest University from 1981 to 1986 and at the University of Virginia from 2001 to 2009, compiling a career college football coaching record of 85–93. Groh was also the head coach for the New York Jets of the National Football League (NFL) for one season, in 2000, tallying a mark of 9–7. He last coached as the defensive coordinator for Georgia Tech in 2012.

Groh is a two-time Atlantic Coast Conference Coach of the Year, winning the award in 2002 and 2007. He has over 38 years of professional and collegiate coaching experience, including 13 seasons in the NFL, a Super Bowl title with the New York Giants, and over a decade of working under coach Bill Parcells.

== Early life and education ==
Born in New York City, Groh grew up in Manhasset, New York, on the North Shore of Long Island. He is a 1962 graduate of Chaminade High School, where he played on Chaminade's undefeated, untied 1961 football team under coach Joe Thomas.

Groh attended the University of Virginia and played on the Virginia Cavaliers football team from 1963 to 1965, lettering at defensive end in 1965. A two-sport athlete, he also lettered on defense for the Cavalier lacrosse team. He is a 1967 graduate of the University of Virginia's McIntire School of Commerce.

== Coaching career ==
=== College ===
Throughout his career, Groh has been a friend and protégé of Bill Parcells, working with him for over 13 years in both collegiate and professional positions. Groh was an assistant under Parcells in two Super Bowls, including a 1990 Super Bowl XXV victory with the New York Giants and a 1996 loss in Super Bowl XXXI with the New England Patriots.

Groh began his college coaching career in 1968 as the defensive coach of the plebe squad at Army, working with Parcells for his first time under head coach Tom Cahill. Groh returned to Virginia in 1970 as head coach of the freshmen team and later defensive line coach. From 1973 through 1977, he was an assistant at North Carolina, followed by a year (1978) as Parcells' defensive coordinator at Air Force and a year at Texas Tech in 1980. Groh received his first head football coach experience with Wake Forest from 1981 through 1986 where his record was 26–40.

=== NFL ===
In 1987, Groh made his NFL debut as the special teams and tight ends coach of the Atlanta Falcons. After a brief return to the college ranks in 1988 as the offensive coordinator for South Carolina, Groh joined the New York Giants coaching staff. He served as the Giants' linebackers coach from 1989 to 1990 and as defensive coordinator in 1991.

Groh's expertise in linebackers led to Bill Belichick hiring him as an assistant with the Cleveland Browns in 1992. Groh then reunited with Parcells in New England from 1993 to 1996 as the defensive coordinator, following him to the New York Jets as the linebacker coach from 1997 through 1999. Groh served as head coach of the New York Jets for the 2000 season, taking over after the intended successor to Bill Parcells, Bill Belichick, quickly resigned. Groh had been approached for the coaching job at Princeton University (which had his son Matthew as quarterback) and rejected it just before he was asked to the take the Jets job. His son Mike served as an assistant coach with him.

Groh engineered the trade of wide receiver Keyshawn Johnson before the draft. The Jets won five of their first six games, which included the "Monday Night Miracle", a 40–37 victory where the Jets scored thirty points in the 4th quarter. However, the Jets, with nine wins in their first 13 games, lost three straight games to close out the season in which they needed just one victory to reach the playoffs. Quarterback Vinny Testaverde stated the grueling practices run by Groh had the team run of gas by the end, and other players (such as Pro Bowl center Kevin Mawae) disliked playing for him.

Five days after the season ended, with permission from Parcells, he interviewed with the University of Virginia. On December 31, he resigned from the Jets to take the job at his alma mater at the University of Virginia.

=== Virginia Cavaliers ===
Groh was named the head coach of the Virginia Cavaliers football team on December 30, 2000, succeeding George Welsh, who retired as the winningest coach in school and Atlantic Coast Conference history. At Virginia, Groh became known for his implementing a 3-4 defense, rare for college football; and for maintaining his NFL mentality. After a 5–7 record in 2001, Groh led Virginia to four consecutive winning seasons and three bowl victories before another 5–7 campaign in 2006. He was named the ACC Coach of the Year in 2002 and 2007.

Groh's first year as Virginia's head coach contained struggles both on and off the field. The 2001 Cavalier team posted a 5–7 record, and Groh, a native of New York City and Long Island, was involved in controversy surrounding comments regarding the September 11, 2001 attacks in his hometown. In response to a reporter's question about whether he and his team should be afraid to fly their charter plane to Clemson soon thereafter, Groh stated "I'm not saying this to make light of it by any means, but I'm not planning on having Arabs in the traveling party, so therefore I think probably that the threat of our plane being hijacked is pretty remote". Both Groh and the president of the university, John T. Casteen III, apologized and recognized the inappropriateness of the remarks. Subsequent to the 2001 season, Groh was selected as the defensive head coach of the Gray team in the 64th Annual Blue–Gray Football Classic; Al Golden joined Groh on the Gray team's coaching staff.

During Groh's second year as head coach, Virginia amassed a 9–5 record with a schedule ranked the 11th toughest in the nation by Jeff Sagarin of USA Today, and Groh was voted the ACC Coach of the Year.

The 2006 Cavaliers were a young team with several new assistant coaches. The team experienced some growing pains, and a few games into the season, freshman Jameel Sewell earned the starting quarterback position, leading Virginia to a 5–7 season record. No Cavalier player made first team All-ACC team for the first time in 20 years. While Groh acknowledged that the year would be a rebuilding experience and a slow start upset some fans, Virginia athletic director Craig Littlepage stated that, "Al will be our head coach" through at least the 2007 season. Littlepage, however, later refused to exercise an option to extend Groh's contract by one year stating that Virginia's expectations were higher than 5–7. Unlike past seasons, Groh only played one true freshman in 2006, which preserved the redshirt of true freshman.

In the 2007 Virginia Cavaliers preseason, Groh was listed among the five worst coaches in college football by Sports Illustrated columnist Stewart Mandel. However, after Groh's 2007 Cavaliers lost their first game at Wyoming, they won their next seven games and started 4–0 in the ACC. After Virginia won their ninth game of 2007, Stewart Mandel stated "there's no question he's gotten every ounce out of that team", and revisited his preseason column by stating "I ended up going with Groh, and obviously he's the one who's most proven it wrong". The team finished the regular season 9–3 overall and 6–2 in the ACC, leading to the Cavaliers' fifth bowl game in the past six seasons. Subsequent to the regular season, Groh was voted the 2007 ACC Coach of the Year by the ACC Media Association.

After leading the 2008 Virginia Cavaliers to a 1–3 start, including a 31–3 loss to a Duke team who had not won an ACC game in its previous 25 attempts, Groh was once again under pressure to resign. However, Virginia quickly turned the season around, reeling off 4 straight wins with the emergence of Marc Verica and the efforts of Cedric Peerman. It wasn't until the November 1 homecoming game against the 2008 Miami Hurricanes at Charlottesville that Virginia lost in overtime, ending Virginia's winning streak and knocking them out of the top spot in the ACC Coastal Division. They subsequently lost to Wake Forest, Clemson and Virginia Tech. This marks the fifth straight loss to the Hokies. They last beat Virginia Tech in 2003, their only win against the team under Groh. Virginia's final standings for 2008 was 5–7 and 3–5 in the ACC.

Groh and his 2009 Virginia Cavaliers team opened the 2009 season with a shocking home loss to William & Mary of the FCS (formerly I-AA). Groh's decision to field three quarterbacks in a spread offense for the game led to a record-tying seven turnovers for the Cavaliers. The loss was the first by Virginia to a I-AA team since 1986, which also came at the hands of William & Mary. The embarrassment of the loss coupled with fears of another losing season once again rekindled calls for Groh's ouster as Virginia head coach from many fans and analysts.

Following the William & Mary loss, the Cavaliers fell to TCU in Charlottesville and then Southern Mississippi in Hattiesburg, Mississippi. Following a bye week, Groh's Virginia team rebounded and reeled off three straight wins, including two road ACC wins (North Carolina and Maryland) and a blow-out over the Big Ten's Indiana. However, after the three straight wins, Virginia reeled off 6 straight losses to close the season. Following a loss to Virginia Tech in the last game of the season, the University of Virginia fired Groh. He left as the second-winningest coach in Virginia history.

=== Georgia Tech ===
On January 15, 2010, it was announced that Groh would be taking the position of defensive coordinator at Georgia Tech for the 2010 season, and coached there through the Yellow Jackets' loss to Clemson on October 6, 2012. He was relieved of his duties on October 8, 2012.

== Legacy ==
While Groh was at Virginia, 13 Cavaliers were selected in the NFL draft, while 19 others signed pro contracts as free agents. During his first five years, Groh maintained a strategy of hiring young, ambitious assistants, and he hoped to build a network of protégés through the football ranks. His assistants have gone on to become head coaches at other Division I-A programs: Ron Prince at Kansas State, Al Golden at University of Miami, Mike London in the Division I-AA University of Richmond, and Danny Rocco, who left Groh's staff after the 2005 season to become head coach at I-AA Liberty University. London subsequently replaced Groh as head coach at Virginia.

A number of assistants have also gone into the ranks of assistants in the NFL. Bill Musgrave, previously with the Jacksonville Jaguars, Washington Redskins Atlanta Falcons, and Minnesota Vikings. Mike London was an assistant with the Houston Texans before returning to Groh's staff and then taking the Richmond job.

Under Groh, Virginia had a 3–2 record in bowl games, with the two losses coming to Fresno State in the 2004 MPC Computers Bowl and Texas Tech in the 2008 Gator Bowl. The Cavaliers defeated West Virginia in the 2002 Continental Tire Bowl and Pittsburgh in the 2003 Continental Tire Bowl and Minnesota in the 2005 Music City Bowl.

His son Mike Groh was a high school football star at Randolph High School in Randolph, New Jersey, who kicked the game-winning field goal in The Star-Ledger's "Greatest High School Football Game Ever Played" in 1990 and proceeded to be the quarterback for the University of Virginia football team during the 1994 and 1995 seasons. After graduation, Mike was his father's offensive coordinator, quarterback coach, and recruiting coordinator for the Cavaliers. He served on the staff of the Chicago Bears for three years. Mike was formerly the offensive coordinator for the Philadelphia Eagles and is currently the wide receivers coach for the New York Giants. His other son, Matt, is the director of player personnel for the New England Patriots.

== Head coaching record ==
=== College ===
Year	Team	Overall	Conference	Standing	Bowl/playoffs	Coaches^{#}	AP^{°}
Wake Forest Demon Deacons (Atlantic Coast Conference) (1981–1986)
1981	Wake Forest	4–7	1–5	6th			
1982	Wake Forest	3–8	0–6	7th			
1983	Wake Forest	4–7	1–6	8th			
1984	Wake Forest	6–5	3–4	6th			
1985	Wake Forest	4–7	1–6	8th			
1986	Wake Forest	5–6	2–5	8th			
Wake Forest:		26–40	8–32				
Virginia Cavaliers (Atlantic Coast Conference) (2001–2009)
2001	Virginia	5–7	3–5	8th			
2002	Virginia	9–5	6–2	2nd	W Continental Tire	25	22
2003	Virginia	8–5	4–4	5th	W Continental Tire		
2004	Virginia	8–4	5–3	4th	L MPC Computers	23	23
2005	Virginia	7–5	3–5	5th (Coastal)	W Music City		
2006	Virginia	5–7	4–4	3rd (Coastal)			
2007	Virginia	9–4	6–2	2nd (Coastal)	L Gator		
2008	Virginia	5–7	3–5	5th (Coastal)			
2009	Virginia	3–9	2–6	6th (Coastal)			
Virginia:		59–53	36–36				
Total:		85–93					
^{#}Rankings from final Coaches Poll.; ^{°}Rankings from final AP Poll.

=== NFL ===
Team	Year	Regular Season					Postseason			
Team	Year	Won	Lost	Ties	Win %	Finish	Won	Lost	Win %	Result
NYJ	2000	9	7	0	.563	3rd in AFC East	–	–	–	–
Total		9	7	0	.563		–	–	–	
Overall total		9	7	0	.563	NFL Championships (0)				
