= 2007 BCS computer rankings =

In American college football, the 2007 BCS computer rankings are a part of the Bowl Championship Series (BCS) formula that determines who plays in the BCS National Championship Game as well as several other bowl games. Each computer system was developed using different methods which attempts to rank the teams' performance. For 2007, the highest and lowest rankings for a team are dropped and the remaining four rankings are summed. A team ranked #1 by a computer system is given 25 points, #2 is given 24 points and so forth. The summed values are then divided by 100 (the maximum value a team can earn if they received four first place votes that were summed). The values are then ranked by percentage. This percentage ranking is then averaged with the Coaches Poll and Harris Poll average rankings, each receiving equal weight, and the results become the BCS Rankings.

== BCS computer rankings average ==
For 2007, the rankings released beginning with the eighth week of the season on October 13. The rankings are updated each week until the end of the season. Data taken from official BCS website. There are missing values in the table because the BCS Rankings only list the top 25 of the BCS Rankings, providing data on how those teams achieved their top 25 ranking. The computers ranking may include teams that do not make the top 25 BCS Rankings once averaged with the AP and Coaches Polls.

	Week 8 Oct 13	Week 9 Oct 20	Week 10 Oct 27	Week 11 Nov 3	Week 12 Nov 10	Week 13 Nov 17	Week 14 Nov 24	Week 15 Dec 2	
1.	South Florida	Boston College	Boston College	Ohio St.	LSU	LSU	Missouri		1.
2.	LSU	LSU	Tie: Ohio St. Arizona St.	LSU	Kansas	Kansas	West Virginia		2.
3.	South Carolina	Ohio St.	NA	Oregon	Oregon	Tie: West Virginia; Ohio State; Arizona State	Ohio State		3.
4.	Kentucky	Arizona St.	LSU	Kansas	Arizona State	NA	Kansas		4.
5.	tie: Ohio St. Arizona St.	South Florida	Kansas	Arizona St.	Missouri	NA	Georgia		5.
6.	NA	Virginia	Oregon	Boston College	Ohio State	Missouri	Virginia Tech		6.
7.	Boston College	Kansas	West Virginia	Oklahoma	Oklahoma	Georgia	LSU		7.
8.	tie: Kansas Virginia Tech	Virginia Tech	Georgia	Missouri	West Virginia	Virginia Tech	Boston College		8.
9.	NA	Oregon	Oklahoma	Georgia	Georgia	Oregon	Arizona State		9.
10.	West Virginia	Tie: Florida West Virginia	Virginia Tech	Tie: Connecticut Virginia Tech	Virginia Tech	Boston College	Tie: USC; Florida		10.
11.	Oklahoma	NA	Connecticut	NA	Florida	Florida	NA		11.
12.	Auburn	Kentucky	South Florida	West Virginia	Virginia	USC	Oklahoma		12.
13.	Oregon	Missouri	Missouri	Michigan	USC	Oklahoma	Tennessee		13.
14.	tie:Cal Virginia	Oklahoma	Auburn	Virginia	Clemson	Virginia	Hawaii		14.
15.	NA	South Carolina	Alabama	Florida	Boston College	Connecticut	South Florida		15.
16.	Missouri	tie: Auburn Connecticut	Michigan	Clemson	Illinois	Tennessee	Clemson		16.
17.	tie:Florida Tennessee	NA	Florida	Auburn	Cincinnati	Texas	Illinois		17.
18.	NA	Wake Forest	Virginia	Texas	Connecticut	Illinois	Oregon		18.
19.	Georgia	Michigan	Tie: Clemson Wake Forest	Penn State	Tennessee	South Florida	BYU		19.
20.	Kansas St.	Georgia	NA	Alabama	Texas	Clemson	Virginia		20.
21.	Wake Forest	USC	Tennessee	NA	Michigan	Cincinnati	Cincinnati		21.
22.	Cincinnati	Alabama	Boise State	Boise State	Kentucky	Hawaii	N/A		22.
23.	USC	UCLA	South Carolina	USC	NA	Wisconsin	Wisconsin		23.
24.	Michigan	Rutgers	Purdue	Tennessee	Wisconsin	BYU	Auburn		24.
25.	Hawaii	Boise State	USC	NA	NA	NA	Texas		25.
	Week 8 Oct 13	Week 9 Oct 20	Week 10 Oct 27	Week 11 Nov 3	Week 12 Nov 10	Week 13 Nov 17	Week 14 Nov 24	Week 15 Dec 2	
		Dropped: Cal; Cincinnati; Hawaii; Kansas St.; Maryland; Tennessee	Dropped: Kentucky; UCLA; Rutgers	Dropped: Purdue; South Carolina; South Florida; Wake Forest	Dropped: Alabama; Auburn; Boise St.; Penn St.	Dropped: Kentucky Michigan	Dropped: Connecticut	None	

== Anderson & Hester ==
Jeff Anderson and Chris Hester are the owners of this computer system that has been a part of the BCS since its inception. The Anderson & Hester Rankings claim to be distinct in four ways:

1. These rankings do not reward teams for running up scores. Teams are rewarded for beating quality opponents, which is the object of the game. Margin of victory, which is not the object of the game, is not considered.
2. Unlike the AP and Coaches Polls, these rankings do not prejudge teams. These rankings first appear after the season's fifth week, and each team's ranking reflects its actual accomplishments on the field, not its perceived potential.
3. These rankings compute the most accurate strength of schedule ratings. Each team's opponents and opponents' opponents are judged not only by their won-lost records but also, uniquely, by their conferences' strength (see #4).
4. These rankings provide the most accurate conference ratings. Each conference is rated according to its non-conference won-lost record and the difficulty of its non-conference schedule.

The BCS once allowed computer rankings to consider margin of victory, but that was removed following the 2004 season. Therefore, all six computer systems currently do not include margin of victory. However, this computer system has never included it in its formula. In addition, only human polls (specifically the AP Poll and Coaches Poll in this reference) "prejudge" teams by releasing pre-season polls with the expected rankings of teams before they have played any games. The last two claims are subjective opinions by the authors of this computer system.

	Week 8 Oct 13	Week 9 Oct 20	Week 10 Oct 27	Week 11 Nov 3	Week 12 Nov 10	Week 13 Nov 17	Week 14 Nov 24	Week 15 Dec 2	
1.	South Florida (6-0)	Arizona State (7-0)	Ohio State (9-0)	Ohio State (10-0)	LSU (9-1)	LSU (10-1)	Missouri (11-1)		1.
2.	Arizona State (7-0)	Ohio State (8-0)	Boston College (8-0)	Oregon (8-1)	Oregon (8-1)	Arizona State (9-1)	West Virginia (10-1)		2.
3.	Ohio State (7-0)	Boston College (7-0)	LSU (7-1)	Kansas (9-0)	Kansas (10-0)	Kansas (11-0)	Ohio State (11-1)		3.
4.	LSU (6-1)	Kansas (7-0)	West Virginia (7-1)	Arizona State (8-1)	Arizona St (9-1)	Missouri (10-1)	Kansas (11-1)		4.
5.	South Carolina (6-1)	LSU (7-1)	Arizona State (8-0)	LSU (8-1)	Missouri (9-1)	Ohio State (11-1)	Georgia (10-2)		5.
6.	Boston College (7-0)	Oregon (6-1)	Oregon (7-1)	Missouri (8-1)	Ohio State (10-1)	West Virginia (9-1)	LSU (10-2)		6.
7.	Kansas (6-0)	South Florida (6-1)	Michigan (7-2)	Boston College (8-1)	Oklahoma (9-1)	Georgia (9-2)	Arizona State (9-2)		7.
8.	Kentucky (6-1)	Virginia (7-1)	Kansas (8-0)	Oklahoma (8-1)	Georgia (8-2)	Oregon (8-2)	USC (9-2)		8.
9.	Oregon (5-1)	Missouri (6-1)	Oklahoma (7-1)	Georgia (7-2)	West Virginia (8-1)	Florida (8-3)	Virginia Tech (10-2)		9.
10.	California (5-1)	Virginia Tech (6-1)	USC (6-2)	Connecticut (8-1)	USC (8-2)	Virginia Tech (9-2)	Boston College (10-2)		10.
11.	Missouri (5-1)	Florida (5-2)	Virginia Tech (6-2)	West Virginia (7-1)	Florida (7-3)	USC (8-2)	Florida (9-3)		11.
12.	Auburn (5-2)	UCLA (5-2)	Georgia (6-2)	Virginia (8-2)	Virginia (9-2)	Boston College (9-2)	Oklahoma (10-2)		12.
13.	Virginia (6-1)	Oklahoma (7-1)	Boise State (7-1)	Florida (6-3)	Texas (9-2)	Texas (9-2)	Oregon (8-3)		13.
14.	Oklahoma (6-1)	USC (6-1)	Connecticut (7-1)	Michigan (8-2)	Virginia Tech (8-2)	Oklahoma (9-2)	Tennessee (9-3)		14.
15.	Virginia Tech (6-1)	West Virginia (6-1)	Missouri (7-1)	USC (7-2)	Illinois (8-3)	Virginia (9-2)	Illinois (9-3)		15.
16.	West Virginia (5-1)	Auburn (5-3)	Purdue (7-2)	Virginia Tech (7-2)	Clemson (8-2)	Tennessee (8-3)	South Florida (9-3)		16.
17.	Georgia (5-2)	Georgia (5-2)	Florida (5-3)	Texas (8-2)	Tennessee (7-3)	Illinois (9-3)	Hawaii (11-0)		17.
18.	USC (5-1)	Kentucky (6-2)	Auburn (6-3)	Alabama (6-3)	Cincinnati (8-2)	Connecticut (9-2)	BYU (9-2)		18.
19.	Tennessee (4-2)	Wake Forest (5-2)	South Florida (6-2)	Penn State (7-3)	Boston College (8-2)	South Florida (8-3)	Clemson (9-3)		19.
20.	Florida (4-2)	Connecticut (6-1)	Rutgers (5-3)	Auburn (7-3)	Connecticut (8-2)	Wisconsin (9-3)	Texas (9-3)		20.
21.	UCLA (4-2)	Alabama (6-2)	Wake Forest (6-2)	California (6-3)	Penn State (8-3)	Cincinnati (8-3)	Wisconsin (9-3)		21.
22.	Wake Forest (4-2)	South Carolina (6-2)	Alabama (6-2)	Boise State (8-1)	Michigan (8-3)	Clemson (8-3)	Auburn (8-4)		22.
23.	Cincinnati (6-1)	Michigan (6-2)	Oregon State (5-3)	Florida State (6-3)	Wisconsin (8-3)	Auburn (7-4)	Virginia (9-3)		23.
24.	Kansas State (4-2)	California (5-2)	Clemson (6-2)	Tennessee (6-3)	Kentucky (7-3)	Hawaii (10-0)	Cincinnati (9-3)		24.
25.	Illinois (5-2)	Penn State (6-2)	Tennessee (5-3)	Clemson (7-2)	Auburn (7-4)	Michigan (8-4)	Michigan (8-4)		25.
	Week 8 Oct 13	Week 9 Oct 20	Week 10 Oct 27	Week 11 Nov 3	Week 12 Nov 10	Week 13 Nov 17	Week 14 Nov 24	Week 15 Dec 2	
		Dropped: Tennessee; Cincinnati; Kansas State; Illinois	Dropped: Virginia; UCLA; Kentucky; South Carolina; California; Penn State	Dropped: Purdue; South Florida; Rutgers; Wake Forest; Oregon State	None	None	None	None	

== Billingsley ==
Richard Billingsley owns this computer system. He describes himself as not a mathematician or computer-geek; simply a devout college football fan since the age of 7. The main components in the formula are: Won-Loss Records, Opponent Strength (based on the opponent's record, rating, and rank), with a strong emphasis on the most recent performance. Very minor consideration is also given to the site of the game, and defensive scoring performance.

Billingsley did use margin of victory, but removed it after the 2001 season. It had accounted for 5% of the total ranking for his system and was part of it for 32 years. Also, this computer system releases rankings each week, using a complex formula to incorporate the previous season's rank (but not ranking score) into the early parts of the current season.

	Week 8 Oct 13	Week 9 Oct 20	Week 10 Oct 27	Week 11 Nov 3	Week 12 Nov 10	Week 13 Nov 17	Week 14 Nov 24	Week 15 Dec 2	
1.	Ohio State (7-0)	Ohio State (8-0)	Ohio State (9-0)	Ohio State (10-0)	LSU (9-1)	Ohio State (11-1)	West Virginia (10-1)		1.
2.	South Florida (6-0)	LSU (7-1)	Boston College (8-0)	LSU (8-1)	Ohio State (10-1)	LSU (10-1)	Ohio State (11-1)		2.
3.	Kentucky (6-1)	Boston College (7-0)	LSU (7-1)	Oregon (8-1)	Oregon (8-1)	West Virginia (9-1)	Missouri (11-1)		3.
4.	LSU (6-1)	Southern Cal (6-1)	West Virginia (7-1)	West Virginia (7-1)	West Virginia (8-1)	Kansas (11-0)	Kansas (11-1)		4.
5.	Boston College (7-0)	West Virginia (6-1)	Arizona State (8-0)	Arizona State (8-1)	Arizona State (9-1)	Arizona State (9-1)	LSU (10-2)		5.
6.	South Carolina (6-1)	Florida (5-2)	Oregon (7-1)	Boston College (8-1)	Kansas (10-0)	Missouri (10-1)	USC (9-2)		6.
7.	West Virginia (5-1)	South Florida (6-1)	Michigan (7-2)	Kansas (9-0)	Southern Cal (8-2)	Virginia Tech (9-2)	Virginia Tech (10-2)		7.
8.	Southern Cal (5-1)	Kentucky (6-2)	Kansas (8-0)	Oklahoma (8-1)	Virginia Tech (8-2)	USC (8-2)	Arizona State (9-2)		8.
9.	Arizona State (7-0)	Arizona State (7-0)	Oklahoma (7-1)	Michigan (8-2)	Oklahoma (9-1)	Georgia (9-2)	Georgia (10-2)		9.
10.	Virginia Tech (6-1)	Michigan (6-2)	Southern Cal (6-2)	Southern Cal (7-2)	Missouri (9-1)	Oregon (8-2)	Hawaii (11-0)		10.
11.	Michigan (5-2)	Virginia Tech (6-1)	Virginia Tech (6-2)	Connecticut (8-1)	Georgia (8-2)	Illinois (9-3)	Florida (9-3)		11.
12.	Oklahoma (6-1)	Oklahoma (7-1)	Georgia (6-2)	Virginia Tech (7-2)	Boise State (9-1)	Boise State (10-1)	Boston College (10-2)		12.
13.	California (5-1)	Oregon (6-1)	Boise State (7-1)	Missouri (8-1)	Illinois (8-3)	Boston College (9-2)	Illinois (9-3)		13.
14.	Florida (4-2)	Rutgers (5-2)	Connecticut (7-1)	Georgia (7-2)	Wisconsin (8-3)	Wisconsin (9-3)	Wisconsin (9-3)		14.
15.	Auburn (5-2)	Missouri (6-1)	Missouri (7-1)	Boise State (8-1)	Florida (7-3)	Florida (8-3)	Boise State (10-2)		15.
16.	Tennessee (4-2)	Boise State (6-1)	Purdue (7-2)	Florida (6-3)	Cincinnati (8-2)	Oklahoma (9-2)	Oklahoma (10-2)		16.
17.	Maryland (4-2)	Virginia (7-1)	Florida (5-3)	Auburn (7-3)	Clemson (8-2)	Connecticut (9-2)	Tennessee (9-3)		17.
18.	Oregon (5-1)	Purdue (6-2)	Auburn (6-3)	Penn State (7-3)	Michigan (8-3)	Texas (9-2)	Arkansas (8-4)		18.
19.	Purdue (5-2)	Auburn (5-3)	South Florida (6-2)	Clemson (7-2)	Penn State (8-3)	Hawaii (10-0)	Connecticut (9-3)		19.
20.	Boise State (5-1)	Kansas (7-0)	Rutgers (5-3)	Texas (8-2)	Connecticut (8-2)	Tennessee (8-3)	Cincinnati (9-3)		20.
21.	Missouri (5-1)	Wake Forest (5-2)	Wake Forest (6-2)	Florida State (6-3)	Texas (9-2)	Cincinnati (8-3)	Oregon (8-3)		21.
22.	Oregon State (4-3)	Alabama (6-2)	Alabama (6-2)	Tennessee (6-3)	Boston College (8-2)	Virginia (9-2)	BYU (9-2)		22.
23.	Wake Forest (4-2)	UCLA (5-2)	Oregon State (5-3)	Rutgers (5-4)	Tennessee (7-3)	Rutgers (7-4)	Clemson (9-3)		23.
24.	Georgia (5-2)	Penn State (6-2)	Clemson (6-2)	Alabama (6-3)	Virginia (9-2)	BYU (8-2)	Virginia (9-3)		24.
25.	Kansas (6-0)	Oregon State (4-3)	Tennessee (5-3)	Wisconsin (7-3)	Hawaii (9-0)	Oregon State (7-4)	Rutgers (7-4)		25.
	Week 8 Oct 13	Week 9 Oct 20	Week 10 Oct 27	Week 11 Nov 3	Week 12 Nov 10	Week 13 Nov 17	Week 14 Nov 24	Week 15 Dec 2	
		Dropped: South Carolina; California; Tennessee; Maryland; Georgia	Dropped: Kentucky; Virginia; UCLA; Penn State	None	None	None	None	None	

== Colley Matrix ==
Wes Colley has a Ph.D. from Princeton University in astrophysical sciences. He attended Virginia, and his brother, Will Colley, played for Georgia. Colley claims 5 advantages using his system:

- First and foremost, the rankings are based only on results from the field, with absolutely no influence from opinion, past performance, tradition or any other bias factor. This is why there is no pre-season poll here. All teams are assumed equal at the beginning of each year.
- Second, strength of schedule has a strong influence on the final ranking. A team does not gain by padding its schedule, so those wins against James Madison or William & Mary are discounted. (Prior to 2007, these games were completely ignored. With the schedule expansion to 12 games, these are now counted but still influence the scores very little since their strength of schedule makes them very weak teams.) For example, Wisconsin with 4 losses finished the 2000 season well ahead of TCU with only 2 losses. That's because Wisconsin's Big 10 schedule was much, much more difficult that TCU's WAC schedule.
- Third, as with the NFL, NHL, NBA, and Major League, score margin does not matter at all in determining ranking, so a large victory margin may influence pollsters, but does not influence this scheme. This reflects Colley's view that the object of football is winning the game, not winning by a large margin.
- Fourth, there is no ad hoc weighting of opponents' winning percentage and opponents' opponents' winning percentage, etc., ad infinitum (no random choices of 1/3 of this + 2/3 of that, for example). In this method, very simple statistical principles, with absolutely no fine tuning are used to construct a system of 117 equations with 117 variables, representing each team according only to its wins and losses, (see Ranking Method). The computer simply solves those equations to arrive at a rating (and ranking) for each team.
- Fifth, comparison between this scheme and the final press polls (1998, 1999, 2000, 2001, 2002) proves that the scheme produces sensible results.

While all computer systems are not biased towards the "Name recognition" of a school, Colley's system doesn't include any information that doesn't involve the current season. No pre-season poll and no carry-over from the previous season.

	Week 8 Oct 13	Week 9 Oct 20	Week 10 Oct 27	Week 11 Nov 3	Week 12 Nov 10	Week 13 Nov 17	Week 14 Nov 24	Week 15 Dec 2	
1.	South Florida (6-0)	Louisiana State (7-1)	Boston College (8-0)	Louisiana State (8-1)	LSU	Louisiana State (10-1)	West Virginia (10-1)	Louisiana State (11-2)	1.
2.	Arizona State (7-0)	Boston College (7-0)	Arizona State (8-0)	Oregon (8-1)	Oregon	Ohio State (11-1)	Missouri (11-1)	Virginia Tech (11-2)	2.
3.	Louisiana State (6-1)	Ohio State (8-0)	Louisiana State (7-1)	Ohio State (10-0)	Arizona St.	Arizona State (9-1)	Ohio State (11-1)	Georgia (10-2)	3.
4.	Ohio State (7-0)	Arizona State (7-0)	Ohio State (9-0)	Boston College (8-1)	Kansas	West Virginia (9-1)	Georgia (10-2)	Missouri (11-2)	4.
5.	Kentucky (6-1)	South Florida (6-1)	Oregon (7-1)	Arizona State (8-1)	Ohio St.	Kansas (11-0)	Louisiana State (10-2)	Ohio State (11-1)	5.
6.	South Carolina (6-1)	Virginia (7-1)	Kansas (8-0)	Kansas (9-0)	Missouri	Missouri (10-1)	Boston College (10-2)	West Virginia (10-2)	6.
7.	Boston College (7-0)	Oregon (6-1)	West Virginia (7-1)	Oklahoma (8-1)	West Virginia	Georgia (9-2)	Virginia Tech (10-2)	Florida (9-3)	7.
8.	Oregon (5-1)	Kansas (7-0)	Connecticut (7-1)	Connecticut (8-1)	Georgia	Oregon (8-2)	Florida (9-3)	Oklahoma (11-2)	8.
9.	Virginia Tech (6-1)	Virginia Tech (6-1)	Georgia (6-2)	Missouri (8-1)	Oklahoma	Boston College (9-2)	Arizona State (9-2)	Arizona State (10-2)	9.
10.	Kansas (6-0)	Kentucky (6-2)	Oklahoma (7-1)	Georgia (7-2)	Florida	Florida (8-3)	Kansas (11-1)	Kansas (11-1)	10.
11.	Oklahoma (6-1)	Missouri (6-1)	South Florida (6-2)	Virginia (8-2)	Virginia	Virginia Tech (9-2)	Oklahoma (10-2)	Boston College (10-3)	11.
12.	Virginia (6-1)	Florida (5-2)	Virginia Tech (6-2)	West Virginia (7-1)	Virginia Tech	Virginia (9-2)	Tennessee (9-3)	USC (10-2)	12.
13.	Auburn (5-2)	West Virginia (6-1)	Missouri (7-1)	Virginia Tech (7-2)	Clemson	South Florida (8-3)	USC (9-2)	South Florida (9-3)	13.
14.	California (5-1)	Oklahoma (7-1)	Michigan (7-2)	Florida (6-3)	Boston College	Texas (9-2)	South Florida (9-3)	Hawaii (12-0)	14.
15.	West Virginia (5-1)	South Carolina (6-2)	Virginia (7-2)	Michigan (8-2)	Texas	Oklahoma (9-2)	Oregon (8-3)	Clemson (9-3)	15.
16.	Missouri (5-1)	Connecticut (6-1)	Boise State (7-1)	Boise State (8-1)	Cincinnati	Tennessee (8-3)	Clemson (9-3)	BYU (10-2)	16.
17.	Cincinnati (6-1)	Michigan (6-2)	Alabama (6-2)	Texas (8-2)	Connecticut	Connecticut (9-2)	BYU (9-2)	Tennessee (9-4)	17.
18.	Florida (4-2)	Auburn (5-3)	Auburn (6-3)	Auburn (7-3)	South Florida	USC (8-2)	Hawaii (11-0)	Virginia (9-3)	18.
19.	Georgia (5-2)	Wake Forest (5-2)	Wake Forest (6-2)	South Florida (6-3)	USC	Illinois (9-3)	Illinois (9-3)	Illinois (9-3)	19.
20.	Hawaii (7-0)	Boise State (6-1)	Florida (5-3)	Alabama (6-3)	Illinois	Clemson (8-3)	Virginia (9-3)	Cincinnati (9-3)	20.
21.	Tennessee (4-2)	UCLA (5-2)	Clemson (6-2)	Clemson (7-2)	Tennessee	BYU (8-2)	Cincinnati (9-3)	Oregon (8-4)	21.
22.	Kansas State (4-2)	Alabama (6-2)	Kentucky (6-3)	Kentucky (6-3)	Kentucky	Cincinnati (8-3)	Texas (9-3)	Texas (9-3)	22.
23.	Illinois (5-2)	Georgia (5-2)	South Carolina (6-3)	Penn State (7-3)	Michigan	Hawaii (10-0)	Wisconsin (9-3)	Connecticut (9-3)	23.
24.	Michigan (5-2)	USC (6-1)	Tennessee (5-3)	Florida State (6-3)	Boise St.	Wisconsin (9-3)	Connecticut (9-3)	Auburn (8-4)	24.
25.	Wisconsin (5-2)	Rutgers (5-2)	Purdue (7-2)	USC (7-2)	Wisconsin	Boise State (10-1)	Auburn (8-4)	Oregon State (8-4)	25.
	Week 8 Oct 13	Week 9 Oct 20	Week 10 Oct 27	Week 11 Nov 3	Week 12 Nov 10	Week 13 Nov 17	Week 14 Nov 24	Week 15 Dec 2	
		Dropped: California; Cincinnati; Hawaii; Tennessee; Kansas State; Illinois; Wisconsin	None	None	None	None	None	None	

== Massey ==
Kenneth Massey is the owner of this complex computer system. He was a Ph.D. candidate of Mathematics at Virginia Tech. Only the score, venue, and date of each game are used to calculate the Massey ratings. However, Massey calculates an offensive and defensive ratings which combine to produce a power ranking as well. The overall team rating is a merit based quantity, and is the result of applying a Bayesian win-loss correction to the power rating.

	Week 8 Oct 13	Week 9 Oct 20	Week 10 Oct 27	Week 11 Nov 3	Week 12 Nov 10	Week 13 Nov 17	Week 14 Nov 24	Week 15 Dec 2	
1.	South Florida (6-0)	Boston College (7-0)	Boston College (8-0)	LSU (8-1)	LSU	LSU (10-1)	Missouri (11-1)		1.
2.	LSU (6-1)	LSU (7-1)	Arizona State (8-0)	Ohio State (10-0)	Kansas	Kansas (11-0)	West Virginia (10-1)		2.
3.	Boston College (7-0)	Ohio State (8-0)	LSU (7-1)	Kansas (9-0)	Oregon	Arizona State (9-1)	Georgia (10-2)		3.
4.	South Carolina (6-1)	South Florida (6-1)	Kansas (8-0)	Oregon (8-1)	Arizona State	Ohio State (11-1)	Ohio State (11-1)		4.
5.	Kentucky (6-1)	Arizona State (7-0)	Ohio State (9-0)	Arizona State (8-1)	Missouri	Georgia (9-2)	Virginia Tech (10-2)		5.
6.	Arizona State (7-0)	Virginia (7-1)	Oregon (7-1)	Boston College (8-1)	Ohio State	Missouri (10-1)	LSU (10-2)		6.
7.	Ohio State (7-0)	Kansas (7-0)	West Virginia (7-1)	Oklahoma (8-1)	Georgia	West Virginia (9-1)	Kansas (11-1)		7.
8.	Virginia Tech (6-1)	Virginia Tech (6-1)	Georgia (6-2)	Missouri (8-1)	Oklahoma	Virginia Tech (9-2)	Boston College (10-2)		8.
9.	West Virginia (5-1)	Florida (5-2)	Virginia Tech (6-2)	Virginia Tech (7-2)	West Virginia	Florida (8-3)	Florida (9-3)		9.
10.	Auburn (5-2)	Oregon (6-1)	South Florida (6-2)	Georgia (7-2)	Virginia Tech	Boston College (9-2)	Arizona State (9-2)		10.
11.	Kansas (6-0)	Kentucky (6-2)	Oklahoma (7-1)	Connecticut (8-1)	Florida	Oregon (8-2)	Tennessee (9-3)		11.
12.	Oregon (5-1)	West Virginia (6-1)	Connecticut (7-1)	West Virginia (7-1)	Clemson	NE Omaha (10-0)	USC (9-2)		12.
13.	Virginia (6-1)	South Carolina (6-2)	Auburn (6-3)	Florida (6-3)	NE Omaha	Tennessee (8-3)	Oklahoma (10-2)		13.
14.	Oklahoma (6-1)	Missouri (6-1)	Alabama (6-2)	Michigan (8-2)	Boston College	USC (8-2)	Clemson (9-3)		14.
15.	California (5-1)	Wake Forest (5-2)	Wake Forest (6-2)	Virginia (8-2)	Virginia	Oklahoma (9-2)	Hawaii (11-0)		15.
16.	Florida (4-2)	Auburn (5-3)	Missouri (7-1)	Alabama (6-3)	Tennessee	Virginia (9-2)	South Florida (9-3)		16.
17.	Missouri (5-1)	Oklahoma (7-1)	Florida (5-3)	Clemson (7-2)	Illinois	Connecticut (9-2)	Illinois (9-3)		17.
18.	Wake Forest (4-2)	Connecticut (6-1)	Clemson (6-2)	Auburn (7-3)	Kentucky	Illinois (9-3)	Oregon (8-3)		18.
19.	Tennessee (4-2)	Michigan (6-2)	Michigan (7-2)		USC	South Florida (8-3)	Auburn (8-4)		19.
20.	Georgia (5-2)	Georgia (5-2)	Virginia (7-2)	Penn State (7-3)	Connecticut	Clemson (8-3)	Virginia (9-3)		20.
21.	Michigan (5-2)	Rutgers (5-2)		Tennessee (6-3)	Michigan	Texas (9-2)	Connecticut (9-3)		21.
22.	Kansas State (4-2)	Alabama (6-2)		Kentucky (6-3)	Cincinnati	Auburn (7-4)	Northern Iowa (12-0)		22.
23.	Maryland (4-2)	Georgia Tech (5-3)			Texas	Kentucky (7-4)	Wisconsin (9-3)		23.
24.	Florida State (4-2)	Maryland (4-3)		Texas (8-2)	Wisconsin	Northern Iowa (11-0)	BYU (9-2)		24.
25.	USC (5-1)	UCLA (5-2)		USC (7-2)	South Florida	Cincinnati (8-3)	Cincinnati (9-3)		25.
	Week 8 Oct 13	Week 9 Oct 20	Week 10 Oct 27	Week 11 Nov 3	Week 12 Nov 10	Week 13 Nov 17	Week 14 Nov 24	Week 15 Dec 2	
		Dropped: California; Tennessee; Kansas State; Florida State; USC	None	None	None	None	None	None	

== Sagarin ==
Jeff Sagarin owns this computer system that is published in USA Today. He holds an MBA from Indiana. This system uses the Elo Chess system where winning and losing are the sole factors. He also publishes a "Predictor" system that uses margin of victory. However, the BCS only uses the Elo Chess system.

	Week 8 Oct 13	Week 9 Oct 20	Week 10 Oct 27	Week 11 Nov 3	Week 12 Nov 10	Week 13 Nov 17	Week 14 Nov 24	Week 15 Dec 2	
1.	South Florida (6-0)	Boston College (7-0)	Boston College (8-0)	Ohio State (10-0)	Kansas (10-0)	Kansas (11-0)	Missouri (11-1)	Virginia Tech (11-2)	1.
2.	LSU (6-1)	LSU (7-1)	Kansas (8-0)	Kansas (9-0)	LSU (9-1)	LSU (10-1)	West Virginia (10-1)	LSU (11-2)	2.
3.	South Carolina (6-1)	Ohio State (8-0)	Ohio State (9-0)	LSU (8-1)	Oregon (8-1)	West Virginia (9-1)	Kansas (11-1)	Oklahoma (11-2)	3.
4.	Kentucky (6-1)	Kansas (7-0)	Arizona State (8-0)	Oregon (8-1)	Arizona State (9-1)	Missouri (10-1)	Virginia Tech (10-2)	Ohio State (11-1)	4.
5.	Boston College (7-0)	Arizona State (7-0)	LSU (7-1)	Boston College (8-1)	Missouri (9-1)	Arizona State (9-1)	Ohio State (11-1)	Kansas (11-1)	5.
6.	Kansas (6-0)	South Florida (6-1)	Virginia Tech (6-2)	Arizona State (8-1)	Ohio State (10-1)	Ohio State (11-1)	Georgia (10-2)	Missouri (11-2)	6.
7.	Ohio State (7-0)	Virginia Tech (6-1)	West Virginia (7-1)	Missouri (8-1)	Oklahoma (9-1)	Georgia (9-2)	Boston College (10-2)	Georgia (10-2)	7.
8.	West Virginia (5-1)	Virginia (7-1)	Georgia (6-2)	Oklahoma (8-1)	West Virginia (8-1)	Virginia Tech (9-2)	LSU (10-2)	Hawaii (12-0)	8.
9.	Arizona State (7-0)	West Virginia (6-1)	Oklahoma (7-1)	Virginia Tech (7-2)	Virginia Tech (8-2)	Boston College (9-2)	Florida (9-3)	USC (10-2)	9.
10.	Virginia Tech (6-1)	South Carolina (6-2)	Oregon (7-1)	Georgia (7-2)	Georgia (8-2)	Florida (8-3)	USC (9-2)	Boston College (10-3)	10.
11.	Auburn (5-2)	Florida (5-2)	South Florida (6-2)	West Virginia (7-1)	Florida (7-3)	Oregon (8-2)	Hawaii (11-0)	West Virginia (10-2)	11.
12.	Oklahoma (6-1)	Kentucky (6-2)	Connecticut (7-1)	Connecticut (8-1)	Clemson (8-2)	Northern Iowa (11-0)	Arizona State (9-2)	Florida (9-3)	12.
13.	Tennessee (4-2)	Oregon (6-1)	Missouri (7-1)	Michigan (8-2)	Boston College (8-2)	USC (8-2)	Oklahoma (10-2)	Arizona State (10-2)	13.
14.	California (5-1)	Oklahoma (7-1)	Clemson (6-2)	Florida (6-3)	USC (8-2)	Oklahoma (9-2)	Tennessee (9-3)	Clemson (9-3)	14.
15.	Missouri (5-1)	Missouri (6-1)	South Carolina (6-3)	Clemson (7-2)	Tennessee (7-3)	Virginia (9-2)	Northern Iowa (12-0)	South Florida (9-3)	15.
16.	Virginia (6-1)	Wake Forest (5-2)	North Dakota State (8-0)	Virginia (8-2)	Virginia (9-2)	Tennessee (8-3)	Clemson (9-3)	Virginia (9-3)	16.
17.	Georgia (5-2)	Connecticut (6-1)	Auburn (6-3)		Illinois (8-3)	Connecticut (9-2)	South Florida (9-3)	Tennessee (9-4)	17.
18.	North Dakota State (6-0)	Auburn (5-3)	Tennessee (5-3)	Tennessee (6-3)	Connecticut (8-2)	South Florida (8-3)	Oregon (8-3)	Illinois (9-3)	18.
19.	Oregon (5-1)	Georgia (5-2)	Florida (5-3)	Alabama (6-3)	Kentucky (7-3)	Clemson (8-3)	Illinois (9-3)	Auburn (8-4)	19.
20.	Florida (4-2)	North Dakota State (7-0)	Alabama (6-2)	Auburn (7-3)	Cincinnati (8-2)	Illinois (9-3)	Virginia (9-3)	Connecticut (9-3)	20.
21.	Kansas State (4-2)	Georgia Tech (5-3)	Wake Forest (6-2)	Penn State (7-3)	Michigan (8-3)	Texas (9-2)	Auburn (8-4)	Oregon State (8-4)	21.
22.	Mississippi State (4-3)	Michigan (6-2)	Virginia (7-2)			Cincinnati (8-3)	Connecticut (9-3)	Cincinnati (9-3)	22.
23.	Wake Forest (4-2)	Maryland (4-3)	Michigan (7-2)	Texas (8-2)	Texas (9-2)	Hawaii (10-0)	Cincinnati (9-3)	BYU (10-2)	23.
24.	Maryland (4-2)	Alabama (6-2)	Georgia Tech (5-3)	USC (7-2)		Auburn (7-4)	BYU (9-2)	Florida State (7-5)	24.
25.	Florida State (4-2)	Clemson (5-2)	Northern Iowa (8-0)			Kentucky (7-4)	Florida State (7-5)	Wake Forest (8-4)	25.
	Week 8 Oct 13	Week 9 Oct 20	Week 10 Oct 27	Week 11 Nov 3	Week 12 Nov 10	Week 13 Nov 17	Week 14 Nov 24	Week 15 Dec 2	
		Dropped: Tennessee; California; Kansas State; Mississippi State; Florida State	Dropped: Kentucky; Maryland	None	None	None	None	None	

== Wolfe ==
Peter Wolfe uses a Bradley-Terry model for his computer system. It uses wins and losses but also uses game location as a factor. In addition, he ranks all teams that can be connected by schedule played (over 700 involving Division I FBS, Division I FCS, II, III and NAIA).

	Week 8 Oct 13	Week 9 Oct 20	Week 10 Oct 27	Week 11 Nov 3	Week 12 Nov 10	Week 13 Nov 17	Week 14 Nov 24	Week 15 Dec 2	
1.	South Florida (6-0)	Boston College (7-0)	Boston College (8-0)	Ohio State	Kansas	LSU (10-1)	Missouri (11-1)		1.
2.	LSU (6-1)	LSU (7-1)	Arizona State (8-0)	LSU	LSU	Kansas (11-0)	West Virginia (10-1)		2.
3.	South Carolina (6-1)	Ohio State (8-0)	Ohio State (9-0)	Oregon	Oregon	West Virginia (9-1)	Ohio State (11-1)		3.
4.	Arizona State (7-0)	Arizona State (7-0)	Kansas (8-0)	Kansas	Missouri	Missouri (10-1)	Virginia Tech (10-2)		4.
5.	Kentucky (6-1)	South Florida (6-1)	LSU (7-1)	Arizona State	Arizona State	Ohio State (11-1)	Kansas (11-1)		5.
6.	Boston College (7-0)	Virginia (7-1)	Oregon (7-1)	Boston College	Ohio State	Arizona State (9-1)	Georgia (10-2)		6.
7.	Ohio State (7-0)	Oregon (6-1)	West Virginia (7-1)	Oklahoma	Oklahoma	Georgia (9-2)	Boston College (10-2)		7.
8.	West Virginia (5-1)	Virginia Tech (6-1)	Oklahoma (7-1)	Missouri	West Virginia	Virginia Tech (9-2)	LSU (10-2)		8.
9.	Virginia Tech (6-1)	West Virginia (6-1)	Virginia Tech (6-2)	Virginia Tech	Georgia	Boston College (9-2)	Oklahoma (10-2)		9.
10.	Kansas (6-0)	Kansas (7-0)	Georgia (6-2)	West Virginia	Virginia Tech	Oregon (8-2)	USC (9-2)		10.
11.	Oklahoma (6-1)	Missouri (6-1)	Connecticut (7-1)	Connecticut	Virginia	Oklahoma (9-2)	Arizona State (9-2)		11.
12.	Hawai'i (7-0)	Oklahoma (7-1)	South Florida (6-2)	Georgia	Hawaii	Florida (8-3)	Florida (9-3)		12.
13.	Missouri (5-1)	Florida (5-2)	Missouri (7-1)	Virginia	Florida	Virginia (9-2)	Tennessee (9-3)		13.
14.	Virginia (6-1)	Connecticut (6-1)	Hawaii (8-0)	Michigan	USC	USC (8-2)	Hawaii (11-0)		14.
15.	Oregon (5-1)	South Carolina (6-2)	Virginia (7-2)	Hawaii	Michigan	Connecticut (9-2)	South Florida (9-3)		15.
16.	California (5-1)	Kentucky (6-2)	Clemson (6-2)	Texas	Boston College	Texas (9-2)	Clemson (9-3)		16.
17.	Auburn (5-2)	Hawaii (7-0)	Alabama (6-2)	Clemson	Clemson	Hawaii (10-0)	Illinois (9-3)		17.
18.	Georgia (5-2)	Wake Forest (5-2)	Auburn (6-3)	Florida	Connecticut	Illinois (9-3)	BYU (9-2)		18.
19.	Tennessee (4-2)	Georgia (5-2)		Florida State	Cincinnati	South Florida (8-3)	Oregon (8-3)		19.
20.	Cincinnati (6-1)	Auburn (5-3)	Michigan (7-2)	Penn State	Illinois	Tennessee (8-3)	Cincinnati (9-3)		20.
21.	Connecticut (5-1)	Michigan (6-2)	Wake Forest (6-2)	Boise State	Texas	Cincinnati (8-3)	Connecticut (9-3)		21.
22.	Kansas State (4-2)	UCLA (5-2)		Tennessee	South Florida	BYU (8-2)	Virginia (9-3)		22.
23.	Florida (4-2)	USC (6-1)	Florida (5-3)	South Florida	Tennessee	Clemson (8-3)	Texas (9-3)		23.
24.	Texas Tech (6-1)	California (5-2)	Boise State (7-1)	USC	Boise State	Boise State (10-1)	Wisconsin (9-3)		24.
25.	Florida State (4-2)	Texas A&M (6-2)		Auburn	Penn State	Wisconsin (9-3)	Auburn (8-4)		25.
	Week 8 Oct 13	Week 9 Oct 20	Week 10 Oct 27	Week 11 Nov 3	Week 12 Nov 10	Week 13 Nov 17	Week 14 Nov 24	Week 15 Dec 2	
		Dropped: Tennessee; Cincinnati; Kansas State; Texas Tech; Florida State	None	None	None	None	None	None	

== Legend ==
	Increase in ranking
	Decrease in ranking
	Not ranked previous week
Italics	Number of first place votes
(#-#)	Win–loss record
(t)	Tied with team above or below also with this symbol

== See also ==
- 2006 BCS computer rankings
