= 2006 BCS computer rankings =

In American college football, the 2006 BCS computer rankings are a part of the Bowl Championship Series (BCS) formula that determines who plays in the BCS National Championship Game as well as several other bowl games. Each computer system was developed using different methods which attempts to rank the teams' performance. For 2006, the highest and lowest rankings for a team are dropped and the remaining four rankings are summed. A team ranked #1 by a computer system is given 25 points, #2 is given 24 points and so forth. The summed values are then divided by 100 (the maximum value a team can earn if they received four first place votes that were summed). The values are then ranked by percentage. This percentage ranking is then averaged with the Coaches Poll and Harris Poll average rankings, each receiving equal weight, and the results become the BCS Rankings.

== BCS computer rankings average ==
For 2006, the rankings were released beginning with the eighth week of the season on October 14. Data taken from official BCS website. There are missing values in the table because the BCS Rankings only list the top 25 of the BCS Rankings, providing data on how those teams achieved their top 25 ranking. The computers ranking may include teams that do not make the top 25 BCS Rankings once averaged with the AP and Coaches Polls.

	Week 8 Oct 14	Week 9 Oct 21	Week 10 Oct 28	Week 11 Nov 4	Week 12 Nov 11	Week 13 Nov 18	Week 14 Nov 25	Week 15 Dec 3	
1.	USC (5)	USC (3) т	Michigan (5)	Michigan (5)	Michigan (5)	Ohio State (6)	Ohio State (5)	Ohio State (5)	1.
2.	Michigan	Michigan (2) т	Ohio State (1)	Ohio State (1)	Rutgers	Michigan	USC (1)	Florida (1) т	2.
3.	Ohio State (1)	Ohio State (1)	California	Louisville	Ohio State (1)	USC	Michigan	Michigan т	3.
4.	Florida	Florida	Florida	California	USC	Florida	Florida	USC	4.
5.	Auburn	California	Notre Dame	Florida	Notre Dame	Notre Dame	LSU	LSU	5.
6.	California	Auburn	USC	Notre Dame	Florida	Louisville	Louisville	Louisville	6.
7.	Notre Dame	Rutgers	Auburn	USC	Louisville	Arkansas	Boise State	Boise State	7.
8.	Arkansas	Notre Dame	Rutgers	Auburn	Wisconsin	Wisconsin	Notre Dame	Auburn	8.
9.	Rutgers	Louisville	Louisville	Rutgers	Arkansas	West Virginia	Arkansas	Notre Dame	9.
10.	Louisville	Arkansas	Tennessee	Texas	Boise State	Rutgers	Auburn	Wisconsin	10.
11.	Boise State	Tennessee	Boise State	Wisconsin	West Virginia	LSU	Rutgers	California	11.
12.	Tennessee	Boise State	Texas	Boise State	California	Boise State	Wisconsin	Arkansas	12.
13.	Oregon	Texas	West Virginia	Arkansas	LSU	Auburn	Tennessee т	Tennessee	13.
14.	West Virginia	West Virginia	Arkansas	West Virginia	Auburn	California	California т	West Virginia т	14.
15.	Texas	Clemson	Wisconsin	LSU	Georgia Tech	Texas	Oklahoma	Rutgers т	15.
16.	Clemson	Boston College т	Boston College	Tennessee	Texas	Georgia Tech	Virginia Tech	Oklahoma	16.
17.	Wisconsin		Washington State	Oklahoma	Wake Forest	Virginia Tech	West Virginia	Oregon State	17.
18.	Boston College	Washington State	Georgia Tech	Georgia Tech	Tennessee	Tennessee	Wake Forest	Wake Forest	18.
19.	Nebraska	Missouri	Oregon	Oregon	Oklahoma	Boston College	Oregon State	Virginia Tech	19.
20.	Tulsa	LSU	Clemson	Wake Forest	Maryland	Oklahoma		UCLA	20.
21.	LSU	Texas A&M т	Oklahoma	Oregon State	Boston College	Penn State	Texas	Texas т	21.
22.	Georgia Tech	Oregon т		Boston College	Oregon	Wake Forest	BYU		22.
	Week 8 Oct 14	Week 9 Oct 21	Week 10 Oct 28	Week 11 Nov 4	Week 12 Nov 11	Week 13 Nov 18	Week 14 Nov 25	Week 15 Dec 3	
		Dropped: Clemson; Wisconsin; Nebraska; Tulsa; Georgia Tech	Dropped: Missouri	Dropped: Washington State; Clemson; Texas A&M	Dropped: Oregon State	Dropped: Maryland; Oregon	Dropped: Georgia Tech; Boston College; Penn State; Clemson	Dropped: Nebraska	

== Anderson & Hester ==
Jeff Anderson and Chris Hester are the owners of this computer system that has been a part of the BCS since its inception. The Anderson & Hester Rankings claim to be distinct in four ways:

1. These rankings do not reward teams for running up scores. Teams are rewarded for beating quality opponents, which is the object of the game. Margin of victory, which is not the object of the game, is not considered.
2. Unlike the AP and Coaches Polls, these rankings do not prejudge teams. These rankings first appear after the season's fifth week, and each team's ranking reflects its actual accomplishments on the field, not its perceived potential.
3. These rankings compute the most accurate strength of schedule ratings. Each team's opponents and opponents' opponents are judged not only by their won-lost records but also, uniquely, by their conferences' strength (see #4).
4. These rankings provide the most accurate conference ratings. Each conference is rated according to its non-conference won-lost record and the difficulty of its non-conference schedule.

The margin of victory was once allowed by the BCS for the computers, but was removed following the 2004 season. Therefore, all six computer systems do not include margin of victory. However, this computer system has never included it in its formula. In addition, only human polls (specifically the AP Poll and Coaches Poll in this reference) "prejudge" teams by releasing pre-season polls with the expected rankings of teams before they have played any games. The last two claims are subjective opinions by the authors of this computer system.

	Week 8 Oct 14	Week 9 Oct 21	Week 10 Oct 28	Week 11 Nov 4	Week 12 Nov 11	Week 13 Nov 18	Week 14 Nov 25	Week 15 Dec 3	
1.	USC (6-0)	USC (6-0)	Michigan(9-0)	Michigan (10-0)	Michigan (11-0)	Ohio State (12-0)	Ohio State (12-0)	Ohio State (12-0)	1.
2.	Michigan (7-0)	Michigan (8-0)	Ohio State (9-0)	Ohio State (10-0)	Ohio State (11-0)	Michigan (11-1)	USC (10-1)	Florida (12-1)	2.
3.	Ohio State (7-0)	Ohio State (8-0)	Rutgers (7-0)	Louisville (8-0)	Rutgers (9-0)	USC (9-1)	Michigan (11-1)	Michigan (11-1)	3.
4.	Florida (6-1)	Rutgers (7-0)	Louisville (7-0)	Florida (8-1)	Florida (9-1)	Florida (10-1)	Florida (11-1)	LSU (10-2)	4.
5.	Rutgers (6-0)	Florida (6-1)	USC (6-1)	California (8-1)	USC (8-1)	Arkansas (10-1)	LSU (10-2)	Louisville (11-1)	5.
6.	Louisville (6-0)	Louisville (7-0)	Florida (7-1)	USC (7-1)	Notre Dame (9-1)	Louisville (9-1)	Louisville (10-1)	USC (10-2)	6.
7.	Auburn (6-1)	California (7-1)	California (7-1)	Rutgers (8-0)	Louisville (8-1)	Notre Dame (10-1)	Rutgers (10-1)	Boise State (12-0)	7.
8.	Notre Dame (5-1)	Notre Dame (6-1)	Notre Dame (7-1)	Notre Dame (8-1)	Arkansas (9-1)	West Virginia (9-1)	Boise State (12-0)	Notre Dame (10-2)	8.
9.	California (6-1)	Auburn (7-1)	Auburn (8-1)	Auburn (9-1)	Wisconsin (10-1)	Rutgers (9-1)	Notre Dame (10-2)	Auburn (10-2)	9.
10.	Arkansas (5-1)	Tennessee (6-1)	Tennessee (7-1)	Texas (9-1)	West Virginia (8-1)	LSU (9-2)	Auburn (10-2)	Rutgers (10-2)	10.
11.	Boise State (6-0)	West Virginia (7-0)	West Virginia (7-0)	Boise State (9-0)	Boise State (10-0)	Auburn (10-2)	Arkansas (10-2)	Oklahoma (11-2)	11.
12.	Tennessee (5-1)	Boise State (8-0)	Boise State (8-0)	Tennessee (7-2)	California (8-2)	Boise State (11-0)	Tennessee (9-3)	West Virginia (10-2)	12.
13.	West Virginia (6-0)	Arkansas (6-1)	Texas (8-1)	West Virginia (7-1)	Auburn (9-2)	Wisconsin (11-1)	California (8-3)	Tennessee (9-3)	13.
14.	Oregon (5-1)	Boston College (6-1)	Arkansas (7-1)	Arkansas (8-1)	LSU (8-2)	California (8-3)	Wisconsin (11-1)	California (9-3)	14.
15.	Boston College (5-1)	Clemson (7-1)	Boston College (7-1)	LSU (7-2)	Wake Forest (9-1)	Oklahoma (9-2)	Oklahoma (10-2)	Wisconsin (11-1)	15.
16.	Clemson (6-1)	Texas (7-1)	Texas A&M (8-1)	Wisconsin (9-1)	Texas (9-2)	Tennessee (8-3)	West Virginia (9-2)	Arkansas (10-3)	16.
17.	Texas (6-1)	Missouri (7-1)	Wisconsin (8-1)	Oklahoma (7-2)	Oklahoma (8-2)	Texas (9-2)	Virginia Tech (10-2)	Wake Forest (11-2)	17.
18.	Nebraska (6-1)	Wisconsin (7-1)	Washington State (6-3)	Wake Forest (8-1)	Tennessee (7-3)	Virginia Tech (9-2)	Wake Forest (10-2)	Virginia Tech (10-2)	18.
19.	LSU (5-2)	Texas A&M (7-1)	LSU (6-2)	Georgia Tech (7-2)	Georgia Tech (8-2)	Boston College (9-2)	Texas (9-3)	Oregon State (9-4)	19.
20.	Texas A&M (6-1)	Washington State (5-3)	Clemson (7-2)	Oregon (7-2)	Maryland (8-2)	Georgia Tech (9-2)	Oregon State (8-4)	Texas (9-3)	20.
21.	Wake Forest (6-1)	LSU (6-2)	Georgia Tech (6-2)	Oregon State (6-3)	Boston College (8-2)	Wake Forest (8-3)	Nebraska (9-3)	UCLA (7-5)	21.
22.	Georgia Tech (5-1)	Wake Forest (6-1)	Oklahoma (6-2)	Boston College (7-2)	Oregon (7-3)	Clemson (8-3)	BYU (10-2)	BYU (10-2)	22.
23.	Missouri (6-1)	Oregon (5-2)	Wake Forest (7-1)	Virginia Tech (7-2)	Virginia Tech (8-2)	Nebraska (8-3)	Texas A&M (9-3)	Texas A&M (9-3)	23.
24.	Wisconsin (6-1)	Tulsa (6-1)	Missouri (7-2)	Maryland (7-2)	Nebraska (8-3)	Penn State (8-4)	Georgia Tech (9-3)	Georgia (8-4)	24.
25.	Tulsa (5-1)	Georgia Tech (5-2)	Oregon (6-2)	Texas A&M (8-2)	Clemson (8-3)	BYU (9-2)	Georgia (8-4)	Boston College (9-3)	25.
	Week 8 Oct 14	Week 9 Oct 21	Week 10 Oct 28	Week 11 Nov 4	Week 12 Nov 11	Week 13 Nov 18	Week 14 Nov 25	Week 15 Dec 3	
		Dropped: Nebraska	Dropped: Tulsa	Dropped: Washington State; Clemson; Missouri	Dropped: Oregon State; Texas A&M	Dropped: Maryland; Oregon	Dropped: Boston College; Clemson; Penn State	Dropped: Nebraska; Georgia Tech	

== Billingsley ==
Richard Billingsley is the owner of this computer system. Self-described as not a mathematician or computer-geek; simply a devout college football fan since the age of 7. The main components in the formula are: Won-Loss Records, Opponent Strength (based on the opponent's record, rating, and rank), with a strong emphasis on the most recent performance. Very minor consideration is also given to the site of the game, and defensive scoring performance.

Billingsley did use margin of victory, but removed it after the 2001 season. It had accounted for 5% of the total ranking for his system and was part of the system for 32 years. Also, this computer system releases rankings each week, using a complex formula to incorporate the previous season's rank (but not ranking score) into the early parts of the current season.

For the 2006 season, this computer ranking uniquely favored Penn State and TCU.

	Week 8 Oct 14	Week 9 Oct 21	Week 10 Oct 28	Week 11 Nov 4	Week 12 Nov 11	Week 13 Nov 18	Week 14 Nov 25	Week 15 Dec 3	
1.	Ohio State (7-0)	Ohio State (8-0)	Ohio State (9-0)	Ohio State (10-0)	Ohio State (11-0)	Ohio State (12-0)	Ohio State (12-0)	Ohio State (12-0)	1.
2.	USC (6-0)	Michigan (8-0)	Michigan (9-0)	Michigan (10-0)	Michigan (11-0)	Michigan (11-1)	Michigan (11-1)	Michigan (11-1)	2.
3.	Michigan (7-0)	USC (6-0)	Texas (8-1)	Texas (9-1)	Rutgers (9-0)	USC (9-1)	USC (10-1)	Florida (12-1)	3.
4.	Auburn (6-1)	Texas (7-1)	Notre Dame (7-1)	Louisville (8-0)	USC (8-1)	Florida (10-1)	Florida (11-1)	Louisville (11-1)	4.
5.	West Virginia (6-0)	West Virginia (7-0)	West Virginia (7-0)	California (8-1)	Wisconsin (10-1)	Wisconsin (11-1)	Louisville (10-1)	Wisconsin (11-1)	5.
6.	California (6-1)	California (7-1)	California (7-1)	Notre Dame (8-1)	Florida (9-1)	Notre Dame (10-1)	Wisconsin (11-1)	Virginia Tech (10-2)	6.
7.	Texas (6-1)	Auburn (7-1)	USC (6-1)	USC (7-1)	Notre Dame (9-1)	Louisville (9-1)	Virginia Tech (10-2)	Oklahoma (11-2)	7.
8.	Oregon (5-1)	Notre Dame (6-1)	Auburn (8-1)	Florida (8-1)	Louisville (8-1)	West Virginia (9-1)	LSU (10-2)	USC (10-2)	8.
9.	Florida (6-1)	Louisville (7-0)	Florida (7-1)	Wisconsin (9-1)	West Virginia (8-1)	Virginia Tech (9-2)	Boise State (12-0)	LSU (10-2)	9.
10.	Louisville (6-0)	Wisconsin (7-1)	Rutgers (8-0)	Auburn (9-1)	Arkansas (9-1)	Arkansas (10-1)	Notre Dame (10-2)	Boise State (12-0)	10.
11.	Notre Dame (5-1)	Florida (6-1)	Tennessee (7-1)	Rutgers (8-0)	LSU (8-2)	LSU	Oklahoma (10-2)	Notre Dame (10-2)	11.
12.	Wisconsin (6-1)	Clemson (7-1)	Louisville (7-0)	West Virginia (7-1)	Boise State (10-0)	Boise State (11-0)	Rutgers (10-1)	Wake Forest (11-2)	12.
13.	Boise State (7-0)	Rutgers (7-0)	Wisconsin (8-1)	LSU (7-2)	Wake Forest (9-1)	Rutgers (9-1)	Wake Forest (10-2)	West Virginia (10-2)	13.
14.	Clemson (6-1)	Tennessee (6-1)	Boise State (8-0)	Boise State (9-0)	Texas (9-2)	Oklahoma (9-2)	Arkansas (10-2)	Auburn (10-2)	14.
15.	Nebraska (6-1)	Boise State (8-0)	Boston College (7-1)	Arkansas (8-1)	Oklahoma (8-2)	Texas (9-2)	Auburn (10-2)	Rutgers (10-2)	15.
16.	Georgia Tech (5-1)	Boston College (6-1)	Georgia Tech (6-2)	Virginia Tech (7-2)	Virginia Tech (8-2)	Georgia Tech (9-2)	Tennessee (9-3)	Tennessee (9-3)	16.
17.	Tennessee (5-1)	Arkansas (6-1)	Virginia Tech (6-2)	Georgia Tech (7-2)	Georgia Tech (8-2)	Auburn (10-2)	West Virginia (9-2)	Arkansas (10-3)	17.
18.	Rutgers (6-0)	Nebraska (6-2)	Arkansas (7-1)	Oklahoma (7-2)	Auburn (9-2)	Wake Forest (9-2)	Texas A&M (9-3)	Texas A&M (9-3)	18.
19.	Arkansas (5-1)	LSU (6-2)	Clemson (7-2)	Wake Forest (8-1)	California (8-2)	Tennessee (8-3)	California (8-3)	California (9-3)	19.
20.	LSU (5-2)	Georgia Tech (5-2)	Penn State (6-3)	Tennessee (7-2)	Maryland (8-2)	Boston College (9-2)	Penn State (8-4)	Penn State (8-4)	20.
21.	Boston College (5-1)	Penn State (5-3)	Oklahoma (6-2)	Maryland (7-2)	Tennessee (7-3)	California (8-3)	TCU (9-2)	TCU (10-2)	21.
22.	Penn State (4-3)	Washington State (5-3)	LSU (6-2)	Oregon (7-2)	Penn State (7-4)	Penn State (8-4)	Texas (9-3)	Texas (9-3)	22.
23.	Texas A&M (6-1)	Texas A&M (7-1)	Washington State (6-3)	Texas A&M (8-2)	Boston College (8-2)	Maryland (8-3)	Georgia (8-4)	Georgia (8-4)	23.
24.	Oklahoma (4-2)	Missouri (7-1)	Texas A&M (8-1)	Penn State (6-4)	TCU (7-2)	TCU (8-2)	Nebraska (9-3)	UCLA (7-5)	24.
25.	Virginia Tech (4-2)	Oregon (5-2)	Oregon (6-2)	Boston College (7-2)	Oregon (7-3)	Nebraska (8-3)	Hawaii (10-2)	BYU (10-2)	25.
	Week 8 Oct 14	Week 9 Oct 21	Week 10 Oct 28	Week 11 Nov 4	Week 12 Nov 11	Week 13 Nov 18	Week 14 Nov 25	Week 15 Dec 3	
		Dropped: Oklahoma; Virginia Tech	Dropped: Nebraska; Missouri	Dropped: Clemson; Washington State	Dropped: Texas A&M	Dropped: Oregon	Dropped: Georgia Tech; Boston College; Maryland	Dropped: Nebraska; Hawaii	

== Colley Matrix ==
Wes Colley, creator of the Colley Matrix, has a Ph.D. from Princeton University in astrophysical sciences. He attended Virginia and is therefore a Virginia fan. His brother, Will Colley, played for Georgia. Colley claims 5 advantages using his system:

- First and foremost, the rankings are based only on results from the field, with absolutely no influence from opinion, past performance, tradition or any other bias factor. This is why there is no pre-season poll here. All teams are assumed equal at the beginning of the year.
- Second, strength of schedule has a strong influence on the final ranking. Padding the schedule wins you very little. Furthermore, only D-IA opponents count in the ranking, so those wins against James Madison or William & Mary don't mean anything. For instance, Wisconsin with 4 losses finished the 2000 season ahead of well ahead of TCU with only 2 losses. That's because Wisconsin's Big 10 schedule was much, much more difficult that TCU's WAC schedule.
- Third, as with the NFL, NHL, NBA, and Major League, score margin does not matter at all in determining ranking, so winning big, despite influencing pollsters, does not influence this scheme. The object of football is winning the game, not winning by a large margin.
- Fourth, there is no ad hoc weighting of opponents' winning percentage and opponents' opponents' winning percentage, etc., ad nauseam (no random choices of 1/3 of this + 2/3 of that, for example). In this method, very simple statistical principals, with absolutely no fine tuning are used to construct a system of 117 equations with 117 variables, representing each team according only to its wins and losses, (see Ranking Method). The computer simply solves those equations to arrive at a rating (and ranking) for each team.
- Fifth, comparison between this scheme and the final press polls (1998, 1999, 2000, 2001, 2002) proves that the scheme produces sensible results.

While all computer systems are not biased towards the "Name recognition" of a school, Colley's system doesn't include any information that doesn't involve the current season. No pre-season poll and no carry-over from the previous season. Colley's focus on strength of schedule without including opponents' strength of schedule is unique.

	Week 8 Oct 14	Week 9 Oct 21	Week 10 Oct 28	Week 11 Nov 4	Week 12 Nov 11	Week 13 Nov 18	Week 14 Nov 25	Week 15 Dec 3	
1.	USC (6-0)	Michigan (8-0)	Michigan (9-0)	Michigan (10-0)	Michigan (11-0)	Ohio State (12-0)	USC (10-1)	Florida (11-1)	1.
2.	Michigan (7-0)	Ohio State (8-0)	Ohio State (9-0)	Ohio State (10-0)	Rutgers (8-0)	USC (9-1)	Ohio State (12-0)	Ohio State (12-0)	2.
3.	Ohio State (7-0)	USC (6-0)	California (6-1)	Louisville (8-0)	Ohio State (11-0)	Michigan (11-1)	Florida (10-1)	Michigan (11-1)	3.
4.	Florida (6-1)	California (6-1)	Florida (7-1)	California (7-1)	USC (8-1)	Florida (9-1)	Michigan (11-1)	USC (10-2)	4.
5.	Auburn (6-1)	Florida (6-1)	Notre Dame (7-1)	Florida (8-1)	Florida (9-1)	Louisville (9-1)	Louisville (10-1)	Louisville (11-1)	5.
6.	California (5-1)	Rutgers (6-0)	USC (6-1)	Notre Dame (8-1)	Notre Dame (9-1)	Notre Dame (10-1)	LSU (10-2)	Boise State (11-0)	6.
7.	Rutgers (5-0)	Notre Dame (6-1)	Rutgers (7-0)	Rutgers (7-0)	Louisville (8-1)	West Virginia (8-1)	Boise State (11-0)	LSU (10-2)	7.
8.	Notre Dame (5-1)	Auburn (7-1)	Louisville (7-0)	USC (7-1)	Wisconsin (9-1)	Rutgers (8-1)	Rutgers (9-1)	Notre Dame (10-2)	8.
9.	Louisville (6-0)	Louisville (7-0)	Auburn (8-1)	Auburn (9-1)	Boise State (9-0)	Wisconsin (10-1)	Notre Dame (10-2)	Auburn (10-2)	9.
10.	Boise State (6-0)	Boise State (7-0)	Tennessee (7-1)	Texas (8-1)	California (7-2)	Arkansas (9-1)	Auburn (10-2)	Wisconsin (10-1)	10.
11.	Arkansas (4-1)	Boston College (5-1)	Boise State (7-0)	Wisconsin (8-1)	Arkansas (8-1)	Boise State (10-0)	Wisconsin (10-1)	West Virginia (9-2)	11.
12.	Tennessee (5-1)	Tennessee (6-1)	West Virginia (6-0)	Boise State (8-0)	West Virginia (7-1)	Auburn (10-2)	Arkansas (9-2)	California (8-3)	12.
13.	Boston College (4-1)	West Virginia (6-0)	Texas (7-1)	West Virginia (6-1)	Auburn (9-2)	LSU (9-2)	California (7-3)	Oklahoma (11-2)	13.
14.	West Virginia (5-0)	Texas (6-1)	Wisconsin (7-1)	Tennessee (7-2)	LSU (8-2)	California (7-3)	Tennessee (9-3)	Rutgers (9-2)	14.
15.	Oregon (5-1)	Wisconsin (6-1)	Boston College (6-1)	Arkansas (7-1)	Texas (8-2)	Boston College (8-2)	Virginia Tech (9-2)	Tennessee (9-3)	15.
16.	Wisconsin (5-1)	Arkansas (5-1)	Texas A&M (7-1)	LSU (7-2)	Georgia Tech (7-2)	Texas (8-2)	Oklahoma (10-2)	Arkansas (9-3)	16.
17.	Texas (5-1)	Missouri (6-1)	Arkansas (6-1)	Georgia Tech (6-2)	Wake Forest (8-1)	Virginia Tech (8-2)	West Virginia (8-2)	Virginia Tech (9-2)	17.
18.	Missouri (5-1)	Clemson (7-1)	Georgia Tech (5-2)	Oklahoma (7-2)	Oklahoma (8-2)	Oklahoma (9-2)	Wake Forest (9-2)	Wake Forest (10-2)	18.
19.	Tulsa (4-1)	Texas A&M (6-1)	Washington State (6-3)	Boston College (6-2)	Boston College (7-2)	Georgia Tech (8-2)	Texas (8-3)	Oregon State (8-4)	19.
20.	Georgia Tech (4-1)	Tulsa (5-1)	Tulsa (6-1)	Oregon (6-2)	Maryland (7-2)	Tennessee (8-3)	BYU (10-2)	Texas (8-3)	20.
21.	Nebraska (5-1)	Wake Forest (5-1)	Missouri (6-2)	Wake Forest (7-1)	Tennessee (7-3)	Wake Forest (8-2)	Oregon State (7-4)	BYU (10-2)	21.
22.	Clemson (6-1)	LSU (6-2)	Clemson (7-2)	Oregon State (5-3)	Virginia Tech (7-2)	BYU (9-2)	Nebraska (8-3)	Boston College (8-3)	22.
23.	Wake Forest (5-1)	Washington State (5-3)	Oklahoma (6-2)	Maryland (6-2)	Oregon (6-3)	Clemson (8-3)	Boston College (8-3)	UCLA (7-5)	23.
24.	Texas A&M (5-1)	Oregon (5-2)	Oregon (5-2)	Virginia Tech (6-2)	Nebraska (7-3)	Nebraska (7-3)	Georgia Tech (8-3)	Texas A&M (8-3)	24.
25.	LSU (5-2)	Georgia Tech (4-2)	LSU (6-2)	Texas A&M (7-2)	Clemson (8-3)	Maryland	Texas A&M (8-3)	TCU (9-2)	25.
	Week 8 Oct 14	Week 9 Oct 21	Week 10 Oct 28	Week 11 Nov 4	Week 12 Nov 11	Week 13 Nov 18	Week 14 Nov 25	Week 15 Dec 3	
		Dropped: Nebraska	Dropped: Wake Forest	Dropped: Washington State; Tulsa; Missouri; Clemson	Dropped: Oregon State; Texas A&M	Dropped: Oregon	Dropped: Clemson; Maryland	Dropped: Nebraska; Georgia Tech	

== Massey ==
Kenneth Massey is the owner of this complex computer system. He was a Ph.D. candidate of mathematics at Virginia Tech. Only the score, venue, and date of each game are used to calculate the Massey ratings. However, Massey calculates an offensive and defensive ratings which combine to produce a power ranking as well. The overall team rating is a merit based quantity, and is the result of applying a Bayesian win-loss correction to the power rating.

	Week 8 Oct 14	Week 9 Oct 21	Week 10 Oct 28	Week 11 Nov 4	Week 12 Nov 11	Week 13 Nov 18	Week 14 Nov 25	Week 15 Dec 3	
1.	USC	USC	Michigan	Michigan	Michigan	Ohio State	Ohio State	Ohio State	1.
2.	Michigan	Michigan	Ohio State	Ohio State	Rutgers	Michigan	USC	Florida	2.
3.	Ohio State	Ohio State	California	Louisville	USC	USC	Florida	Michigan	3.
4.	Florida	California	Florida	California	Notre Dame	Florida	Michigan	USC	4.
5.	Auburn	Auburn	Auburn	Florida	Florida	Arkansas	LSU	LSU	5.
6.	California	Florida	Notre Dame	Auburn	Ohio State	Notre Dame	Arkansas	Auburn	6.
7.	Arkansas	Arkansas	USC	Notre Dame	Arkansas	Louisville	Auburn	Boise State	7.
8.	Notre Dame	Notre Dame	Tennessee	USC	Louisville	Wisconsin	Boise State	Arkansas	8.
9.	Tennessee	Tennessee	Rutgers	Rutgers	Wisconsin	Auburn	Louisville	Louisville	9.
10.	Oregon	Rutgers	Louisville	Arkansas	California	West Virginia	Notre Dame	California	10.
11.	Boise State	Louisville	Arkansas	Tennessee	West Virginia	LSU	California	Notre Dame	11.
12.	Rutgers	Boise State	Boise State	Wisconsin	Boise State	Boise State	Tennessee	Tennessee	12.
13.	Louisville	Washington State	Washington State	Boise State	Auburn	California	Wisconsin	Wisconsin	13.
14.	Boston College	Boston College	West Virginia	LSU	LSU	Rutgers	Rutgers	Oregon State	14.
15.	Texas	Texas	Texas	Texas	Tennessee	Tennessee	Oregon State	West Virginia	15.
	Week 8 Oct 14	Week 9 Oct 21	Week 10 Oct 28	Week 11 Nov 4	Week 12 Nov 11	Week 13 Nov 18	Week 14 Nov 25	Week 15 Dec 3	
		Dropped: Tulsa; Nebraska; Oklahoma; Iowa	Dropped: Missouri	Dropped: Clemson; Virginia Tech	Dropped: Oregon State	Dropped: Oregon; Maryland; Oklahoma	Dropped: Georgia Tech; Boston College; Penn State; Texas; Clemson	None	

== Sagarin ==
Jeff Sagarin is the owner of this computer system published in USA Today. He olds an MBA from Indiana. This system uses the Elo Chess system where winning and losing are the sole factors. He also publishes a "Predictor" system that uses margin of victory. However, the BCS only uses the Elo Chess system.

	Week 8 Oct 14	Week 9 Oct 21	Week 10 Oct 28	Week 11 Nov 4	Week 12 Nov 11	Week 13 Nov 18	Week 14 Nov 25	Week 15 Dec 3	
1.	USC	USC	Michigan	Michigan	Michigan	Ohio State	Ohio State	Ohio State (12-0)	1.
2.	Michigan	Michigan	Ohio State	Ohio State	Rutgers	Michigan	Michigan	Michigan (11-1)	2.
3.	Ohio State	Ohio State	California	Notre Dame	Ohio State	USC	USC	Florida (12-1)	3.
4.	Arkansas	Arkansas	Florida	Louisville	Notre Dame	Notre Dame	Florida	USC (10-2)	4.
5.	Florida	Auburn	USC	California	USC	Arkansas	LSU	LSU (10-2)	5.
6.	Auburn	Florida	Auburn	USC	Wisconsin	Wisconsin	Boise State	Boise State (12-0)	6.
7.	Notre Dame	California	Notre Dame	Auburn	Louisville	Florida	Arkansas	Auburn (10-2)	7.
8.	California	Notre Dame	Tennessee	Florida	Florida	Boise State	Auburn	Wisconsin (11-1)	8.
9.	Rutgers	Tennessee	Arkansas	Arkansas	Arkansas	Louisville	Notre Dame	Notre Dame (10-2)	9.
10.	Tennessee	Rutgers	Boise State	Wisconsin	Boise State	Auburn	Wisconsin	Arkansas (10-3)	10.
11.	Boise State	Boise State	Rutgers	Boise State	California	California	California	California (9-3)	11.
12.	Oregon	Texas	Washington State	Rutgers	West Virginia	LSU	Tennessee	Tennessee (9-3)	12.
13.	Wisconsin	Washington State	Texas	Texas	Auburn	West Virginia	Louisville	Louisville (11-1)	13.
14.	Louisville	Wisconsin	Louisville	LSU	LSU	Rutgers	Rutgers	Oregon State (9-4)	14.
	Week 8 Oct 14	Week 9 Oct 21	Week 10 Oct 28	Week 11 Nov 4	Week 12 Nov 11	Week 13 Nov 18	Week 14 Nov 25	Week 15 Dec 3	
		Dropped: Nebraska; Tulsa	None	Dropped: Clemson	Dropped: Oregon State	Dropped: Oregon; Wake Forest; Maryland	Dropped: Penn State; Georgia Tech; Boston College; Texas; Clemson	None	

== Wolfe ==
Peter Wolfe uses a Bradley-Terry model for his computer system. It uses wins and losses but also uses game location as a factor. In addition, he ranks all teams that can be connected by schedule played (over 700 involving Division I-A, I-AA, II, III and NAIA).

	Week 8 Oct 14	Week 9 Oct 21	Week 10 Oct 28	Week 11 Nov 4	Week 12 Nov 11	Week 13 Nov 18	Week 14 Nov 25	Week 15 Dec 3	
1.	USC	Michigan	Michigan	Michigan	Michigan	Ohio State	Ohio State	Ohio State (12-0)	1.
2.	Michigan	USC	Ohio State	Ohio State	Rutgers	Michigan	Michigan	Michigan (11-1)	2.
3.	Ohio State	Ohio State	California	Louisville	Ohio State	USC	USC	Florida (12-1)	3.
4.	Florida	Rutgers	Notre Dame	Notre Dame	Notre Dame	Notre Dame	Florida	USC (10-2)	4.
5.	Arkansas	Florida	Florida	Florida	Louisville	Florida	LSU	LSU (10-2)	5.
6.	Notre Dame	California	USC	USC	USC	Louisville	Louisville	Louisville (11-1)	6.
7.	Auburn	Notre Dame	Louisville	California	Wisconsin	Arkansas	Notre Dame	Notre Dame (10-2)	7.
8.	California	Arkansas	Rutgers	Texas	Florida	West Virginia	Arkansas	Boise State (12-0)	8.
9.	Louisville	Auburn	Texas	Auburn	Arkansas	Rutgers	Rutgers	Wisconsin (11-1)	9.
10.	Rutgers	Louisville	Tennessee	Wisconsin	Boise State	Wisconsin	Boise State	Auburn (10-2)	10.
11.	Boise State	Texas	Auburn	Boise State	West Virginia	Boise State	Wisconsin	Arkansas (10-3)	11.
12.	Tennessee	Clemson	Boise State	Rutgers	Texas	LSU	Auburn	Rutgers (10-2)	12.
13.	Clemson	West Virginia	West Virginia	Arkansas	California	Texas	Tennessee	California (9-3)	13.
14.	West Virginia	Wisconsin	Arkansas	West Virginia	LSU	Auburn	California	Tennessee (9-3)	14.
15.	Oregon	Tennessee	Wisconsin	LSU	Georgia Tech	Georgia Tech	Oklahoma	Oklahoma (11-2)	15.
16.	Wisconsin	Boise State	Boston College	Oklahoma	Maryland	California	Virginia Tech	West Virginia (10-2)	16.
17.	Nebraska	Boston College	Washington State	Tennessee	Auburn	Boston College	West Virginia	Wake Forest (11-2)	17.
18.	Texas	Missouri	Oregon	Georgia Tech	Wake Forest	Virginia Tech		Oregon State (9-4)	18.
19.	Boston College		Clemson	Maryland	Boston College	Penn State	Texas	Virginia Tech (10-2)	19.
20.	Tulsa	Washington State		Oregon	Oklahoma	Tennessee	Wake Forest	Penn State (8-4)	20.
	Week 8 Oct 14	Week 9 Oct 21	Week 10 Oct 28	Week 11 Nov 4	Week 12 Nov 11	Week 13 Nov 18	Week 14 Nov 25	Week 15 Dec 3	
		Dropped: Nebraska; Tulsa	Dropped: LSU	Dropped: Washington State; Clemson; Texas A&M	Dropped: Oregon State	Dropped: Maryland; Oregon	Dropped: Boston College; Penn State; Clemson	Dropped: Georgia Tech; Nebraska	

== Legend ==
	Increase in ranking
	Decrease in ranking
	Not ranked previous week
Italics	Number of first place votes
(#-#)	Win–loss record
т	Tied with team above or below also with this symbol

== See also ==
- 2007 BCS computer rankings
