= Colorado Buffaloes football statistical leaders =

The Colorado Buffaloes football statistical leaders are individual statistical leaders of the Colorado Buffaloes football program in various categories, including passing, rushing, receiving, total offense, defensive stats, and kicking. Within those areas, the lists identify single-game, single-season, and career leaders. The Buffaloes represent the University of Colorado Boulder in the NCAA Division I FBS Big 12 Conference.

Although Colorado began competing in intercollegiate football in 1890, the school's official record book considers the "modern era" to have begun in the 1930s. Records prior to this year are often incomplete and inconsistent, and are generally not included in these lists.

These lists are dominated by more recent players for several reasons:

- Since the 1930s, seasons have increased from 10 games to 11 and then 12 games in length.
- The NCAA didn't allow freshmen to play varsity football until 1972 (with the exception of the World War II years), allowing players to have four-year careers.
- Since 2018, players have been allowed to participate in as many as four games in a redshirt season; previously, playing in even one game "burned" the redshirt. Since 2024, postseason games have not counted against the four-game limit. These changes to redshirt rules have given very recent players several extra games to accumulate statistics.
- Bowl games only began counting toward single-season and career statistics in 2002. The Buffaloes have played in six bowl games since then, allowing players in those seasons an extra game to accumulate statistics. However, Colorado record books before 2024 did not include bowl games from any season in any category of career statistics. Even in 2024, only passing, rushing, and total offense leaderboards incorporate bowl game statistics.
- Similarly, the Buffaloes have appeared in the Big 12 Championship Game four times and the Pac-12 Championship Game once, giving players in those seasons yet another game to accumulate stats.
- Due to COVID-19 disruptions, the NCAA ruled that the 2020 season would not count against any football player's athletic eligibility, giving all players active in that season the opportunity for five years of play instead of the normal four.

These lists are updated through the end of the 2025 season.

== Passing ==
=== Passing yards ===
Career
Rank	Player	Yards	Years
1	Sefo Liufau	9,763	2013 2014 2015 2016
2	Steven Montez	9,710	2016 2017 2018 2019
3	Cody Hawkins	7,731	2007 2008 2009 2010
4	Joel Klatt	7,708	2002 2003 2004 2005
5	Shedeur Sanders	7,364	2023 2024
6	Kordell Stewart	6,481	1991 1992 1993 1994
7	Tyler Hansen	5,705	2008 2009 2010 2011
8	Koy Detmer	5,390	1992 1994 1995 1996
9	Mike Moschetti	4,797	1998 1999
10	John Hessler	4,788	1994 1995 1996 1997

Single season
Rank	Player	Yards	Year
1	Shedeur Sanders	4,134	2024
2	Koy Detmer	3,527	1996
3	Shedeur Sanders	3,230	2023
4	Sefo Liufau	3,200	2014
5	Cody Hawkins	3,015	2007
6	Steven Montez	2,975	2017
7	Tyler Hansen	2,883	2011
8	Steven Montez	2,849	2018
9	Steven Montez	2,808	2019
10	Joel Klatt	2,696	2005

Single game
Rank	Player	Yards	Year	Opponent
1	Shedeur Sanders	510	2023	TCU
2	Tyler Hansen	474	2011	California
3	Mike Moschetti	465	1999	San Jose State
4	Koy Detmer	457	1996	Missouri
5	Sefo Liufau	455	2014	California
6	Shedeur Sanders	445	2024	North Dakota State
7	Shedeur Sanders	438	2024	Oklahoma State
8	Koy Detmer	426	1995	NE Louisiana
9	Joel Klatt	419	2003	Kansas
10	Koy Detmer	418	1992	Oklahoma

=== Passing touchdowns ===
Career
Rank	Player	TDs	Years
1	Shedeur Sanders	64	2023 2024
2	Cody Hawkins	63	2007 2008 2009 2010
	Steven Montez	63	2016 2017 2018 2019
4	Sefo Liufau	60	2013 2014 2015 2016
5	Joel Klatt	46	2002 2003 2004 2005
6	Koy Detmer	40	1992 1994 1995 1996
7	Tyler Hansen	35	2008 2009 2010 2011
8	John Hessler	34	1994 1995 1996 1997
9	Kordell Stewart	33	1991 1992 1993 1994
	Mike Moschetti	33	1998 1999

Single season
Rank	Player	TDs	Year
1	Shedeur Sanders	37	2024
2	Sefo Liufau	28	2014
3	Shedeur Sanders	27	2023
4	Koy Detmer	22	1996
	Cody Hawkins	22	2007
5	Joel Klatt	21	2003
7	John Hessler	20	1995
	Tyler Hansen	20	2011
9	Steven Montez	19	2018
10	Mike Moschetti	18	1999
	Steven Montez	18	2017

Single game
Rank	Player	TDs	Year	Opponent
1	Sefo Liufau	7	2014	California
2	John Hessler	5	1995	Oklahoma
	John Hessler	5	1995	Oklahoma State
	Koy Detmer	5	1996	Iowa State
	Shedeur Sanders	5	2023	Stanford
	Shedeur Sanders	5	2024	Oklahoma State
7	Darian Hagan	4	1990	Oklahoma State
	Kordell Stewart	4	1992	Colorado State
	Koy Detmer	4	1995	Northeast Louisiana
	Mike Moschetti	4	1999	Oklahoma
	Mike Moschetti	4	1998	Oregon
	Joel Klatt	4	2003	Colorado State
	Joel Klatt	4	2005	Kansas
	Cody Hawkins	4	2008	Iowa State
	Cody Hawkins	4	2009	Toledo
	Shedeur Sanders	4	2023	TCU
	Shedeur Sanders	4	2023	Colorado State
	Shedeur Sanders	4	2023	USC
	Shedeur Sanders	4	2024	North Dakota State
	Shedeur Sanders	4	2024	Colorado State
	Julian Lewis	4	2026	Weber State

== Rushing ==
=== Rushing yards ===
Career
Rank	Player	Yards	Years
1	Eric Bieniemy	3,940	1987 1988 1989 1990
2	Rodney Stewart	3,598	2008 2009 2010 2011
3	Phillip Lindsay	3,550	2014 2015 2016 2017
4	Bobby Purify	3,096	2000 2001 2002 2003 2004
5	Rashaan Salaam	3,057	1992 1993 1994
6	Charlie Davis	2,958	1971 1972 1973
7	Hugh Charles	2,795	2004 2005 2006 2007
8	Chris Brown	2,787	2001 2002
9	James Mayberry	2,548	1975 1976 1977 1978
10	Herchell Troutman	2,487	1994 1995 1996 1997

Single season
Rank	Player	Yards	Year
1	Rashaan Salaam	2,055	1994
2	Chris Brown	1,841	2002
3	Eric Bieniemy	1,628	1990
4	Charlie Davis	1,386	1971
5	Rodney Stewart	1,318	2010
6	James Mayberry	1,299	1977
7	Phillip Lindsay	1,254	2017
8	Phillip Lindsay	1,252	2016
9	Eric Bieniemy	1,243	1988
10	Tony Reed	1,210	1976

Single game
Rank	Player	Yards	Year	Opponent
1	Charlie Davis	342	1971	Oklahoma State
2	Rashaan Salaam	317	1994	Texas
3	Chris Brown	309	2002	Kansas
4	Jarek Broussard	301	2020	Arizona
5	Phillip Lindsay	281	2017	Arizona
6	Rashaan Salaam	259	1994	Iowa State
7	Bobby Anderson	254	1969	Alabama
8	James Mayberry	250	1977	Oklahoma State
9	J.J. Flannigan	246	1989	Kansas State
10	Carroll Hardy	238	1954	Kansas State

=== Rushing touchdowns ===
Career
Rank	Player	TDs	Years
1	Eric Bieniemy	41	1987 1988 1989 1990
2	Chris Brown	35	2001 2002
3	Bobby Anderson	34	1967 1968 1969
4	Rashaan Salaam	33	1992 1993 1994
5	Phillip Lindsay	32	2014 2015 2016 2017
6	J.J. Flannigan	27	1987 1988 1989
	Darian Hagan	27	1988 1989 1990 1991
8	James Mayberry	25	1975 1976 1977 1978
	Rodney Stewart	25	2008 2009 2010 2011
10	Merwin Hodel	24	1949 1950 1951
	Charlie Davis	24	1971 1972 1973

Single season
Rank	Player	TDs	Year
1	Rashaan Salaam	24	1994
2	Bobby Anderson	18	1969
	J.J. Flannigan	18	1989
	Chris Brown	18	2002
5	Darian Hagan	17	1989
	Eric Bieniemy	17	1990
7	Chris Brown	16	2001
8	Phillip Lindsay	16	2016
9	Merwin Hodel	15	1950
	Jim Kelleher	15	1976
	Phillip Lindsay	15	2016

Single game
Rank	Player	TDs	Year	Opponent
1	Chris Brown	6	2001	Nebraska
2	Earl Loser	4	1923	BYU
	Max Chamberlain	4	1925	Denver
	Bill Smith	4	1928	Colorado Mines
	Kayo Lam	4	1935	Colorado Mines
	Byron White	4	1937	Colorado Mines
	Harry Narcisian	4	1948	Kansas State
	John Bayuk	4	1954	Arizona
	Bobby Anderson	4	1969	Tulsa
	James Mayberry	4	1978	Northwestern
	J.J. Flannigan	4	1989	Kansas State
	Eric Bieniemy	4	1990	Nebraska
	Rashaan Salaam	4	1994	Wisconsin
	Rashaan Salaam	4	1994	Oklahoma
	Michael Adkins II	4	2013	Charleston Southern

== Receiving ==
=== Receptions ===
Career
Rank	Player	Rec	Years
1	Nelson Spruce	294	2012 2013 2014 2015
2	Scotty McKnight	219	2007 2008 2009 2010
3	Shay Fields	194	2014 2015 2016 2017
4	Michael Westbrook	167	1991 1992 1993 1994
5	Paul Richardson	156	2010 2011 2012 2013
6	Travis Hunter	153	2023 2024
7	Phil Savoy	152	1994 1995 1996 1997
8	Laviska Shenault Jr.	149	2017 2018 2019
9	Javon Green	136	1997 1998 1999 2000
10	Rae Carruth	135	1992 1994 1995 1996

Single season
Rank	Player	Rec	Year
1	Nelson Spruce	106	2014
2	Travis Hunter	96	2024
2	Nelson Spruce	89	2015
3	Laviska Shenault Jr.	86	2018
4	Paul Richardson	83	2013
6	D.J. Hackett	78	2003
7	Michael Westbrook	76	1992
	Scotty McKnight	76	2009
9	LaJohntay Wester	74	2024
10	Devin Ross	69	2016

Single game
Rank	Player	Rec	Year	Opponent
1	Nelson Spruce	19	2014	California
2	Nelson Spruce	13	2014	Hawai’i
	Nelson Spruce	13	2014	Washington
	Travis Hunter	13	2023	Stanford
	Travis Hunter	13	2024	Colorado State
6	Michael Westbrook	11	1992	Baylor
	Charles Johnson	11	1992	Missouri
	Derek McCoy	11	2003	Washington State
	Scotty McKnight	11	2009	Toledo
	Markques Simas	11	2009	Oklahoma State
	Paul Richardson	11	2010	Kansas
	Paul Richardson	11	2011	California
	Paul Richardson	11	2013	Central Arkansas
	Paul Richardson	11	2013	California
	Nelson Spruce	11	2015	UCLA
	Phillip Lindsay	11	2016	UCLA
	Travis Hunter	11	2023	TCU
	Jimmy Horn Jr.	11	2023	TCU
	LaJohntay Wester	11	2024	Oklahoma State
	Joseph Williams	11	2026	Baylor

=== Receiving yards ===
Career
Rank	Player	Yards	Years
1	Nelson Spruce	3,347	2012 2013 2014 2015
2	Shay Fields	2,590	2014 2015 2016 2017
3	Scotty McKnight	2,588	2007 2008 2009 2010
4	Michael Westbrook	2,548	1991 1992 1993 1994
5	Rae Carruth	2,540	1992 1994 1995 1996
6	Charles Johnson	2,447	1990 1991 1992 1993
7	Paul Richardson	2,412	2010 2011 2012 2013
8	Phil Savoy	2,176	1994 1995 1996 1997
9	Derek McCoy	2,038	2000 2001 2002 2003
10	Javon Green	2,031	1997 1998 1999 2000

Single season
Rank	Player	Yards	Year
1	Paul Richardson	1,343	2013
2	Travis Hunter	1,258	2024
3	Nelson Spruce	1,198	2014
4	Charles Johnson	1,149	1992
5	Rae Carruth	1,116	1996
6	Charles Johnson	1,082	1993
7	Michael Westbrook	1,060	1992
8	Nelson Spruce	1,053	2015
9	D.J. Hackett	1,013	2003
10	Laviska Shenault Jr.	1,011	2018

Single game
Rank	Player	Yards	Year	Opponent
1	Paul Richardson	284	2011	California
2	Walter Stanley	222	1981	Texas Tech
3	Rae Carruth	222	1996	Missouri
4	Paul Richardson	209	2013	Central Arkansas
5	Paul Richardson	208	2013	Colorado State
6	Jimmy Horn Jr.	198	2024	North Dakota State
7	Omarion Miller	196	2023	USC
8	Derek McCoy	192	2003	Colorado State
9	Michael Westbrook	186	1992	Baylor
10	Charles Johnson	182	1992	Oklahoma

=== Receiving touchdowns ===
Career
Rank	Player	TDs	Years
1	Nelson Spruce	23	2012 2013 2014 2015
2	Scotty McKnight	22	2007 2008 2009 2010
3	Paul Richardson	21	2010 2011 2012 2013
	Shay Fields	21	2014 2015 2016 2017
5	Rae Carruth	20	1992 1994 1995 1996
	Derek McCoy	20	2000 2001 2002 2003
	Travis Hunter	20	2023 2024
8	Michael Westbrook	19	1991 1992 1993 1994
9	Javon Green	17	1997 1998 1999 2000
10	Charles Johnson	15	1990 1991 1992 1993

Single season
Rank	Player	TDs	Year
1	Travis Hunter	15	2024
2	Nelson Spruce	12	2014
3	Derek McCoy	11	2003
4	Paul Richardson	10	2013
	LaJohntay Wester	10	2024
6	Charles Johnson	9	1993
	Rae Carruth	9	1995
	Shay Fields	9	2016
9	Gary Knafelc	8	1953
	Michael Westbrook	8	1992
	Rae Carruth	8	1996
	Toney Clemons	8	2011
	Omarion Miller	8	2025

Single game
Rank	Player	TDs	Year	Opponent
1	Richard Johnson	3	1982	Kansas
	Rae Carruth	3	1996	Iowa State
	Nelson Spruce	3	2014	California
	Shay Fields	3	2016	Oregon State
	Dylan Edwards	3	2023	TCU
	Travis Hunter	3	2024	North Dakota State
	Travis Hunter	3	2024	Oklahoma State

== Total offense ==
Total offense is the sum of passing and rushing statistics. It does not include receiving or returns.

=== Total offense yards ===
Career
Rank	Player	Yards	Years
1	Sefo Liufau	10,702	2013 2014 2015 2016
2	Steven Montez	10,670	2016 2017 2018 2019
3	Kordell Stewart	8,538	1991 1992 1993 1994
4	Cody Hawkins	7,718	2007 2008 2009 2010
5	Joel Klatt	7,562	2002 2003 2004 2005
6	Shedeur Sanders	7,237	2023 2024
7	Tyler Hansen	6,338	2008 2009 2010 2011
8	Darian Hagan	6,276	1988 1989 1990 1991
9	Koy Detmer	5,747	1992 1994 1995 1996
10	Mike Moschetti	5,355	1998 1999

Single season
Rank	Player	Yards	Year
1	Shedeur Sanders	4,084	2024
2	Sefo Liufau	3,336	2014
3	Steven Montez	3,313	2017
4	Steven Montez	3,187	2018
5	Shedeur Sanders	3,153	2023
6	Koy Detmer	3,150	1996
7	Tyler Hansen	2,998	2011
8	Steven Montez	2,961	2019
9	Sefo Liufau	2,860	2016
10	Kordell Stewart	2,823	1993

Single game
Rank	Player	Yards	Year	Opponent
1	Sefo Liufau	527	2014	California
2	Mike Moschetti	500	1999	San Jose State
	Tyler Hansen	500	2011	California
4	Shedeur Sanders	478	2023	TCU
5	Steven Montez	468	2016	Oregon
6	Shedeur Sanders	462	2024	North Dakota State
7	Koy Detmer	457	1996	Missouri
8	Sefo Liufau	453	2016	Washington State
9	Mike Moschetti	446	1999	Oklahoma
10	Shedeur Sanders	437	2023	Stanford

=== Touchdowns responsible for ===
"Touchdowns responsible for" is the NCAA's official term for combined passing and rushing touchdowns.

Career
Rank	Player	TDs	Years
1	Steven Montez	74	2016 2017 2018 2019
2	Sefo Liufau	73	2013 2014 2015 2016
3	Shedeur Sanders	72	2023 2024
4	Cody Hawkins	70	2007 2008 2009 2010
5	Darian Hagan	54	1988 1989 1990 1991
6	Joel Klatt	49	2002 2003 2004 2005
7	Kordell Stewart	48	1991 1992 1993 1994
8	John Hessler	44	1994 1995 1996 1997
9	Bobby Anderson	43	1967 1968 1969
	Koy Detmer	43	1992 1994 1995 1996
	Tyler Hansen	43	2008 2009 2010 2011

Single season
Rank	Player	TDs	Year
1	Shedeur Sanders	41	2024
2	Shedeur Sanders	31	2023
3	Sefo Liufau	28	2014
4	Koy Detmer	25	1996
	Cody Hawkins	25	2007
6	Rashaan Salaam	24	1994
	John Hessler	24	1995
8	Mike Moschetti	23	1999
	Tyler Hansen	23	2011
	Steven Montez	23	2018

Single game
Rank	Player	TDs	Year	Opponent
1	Sefo Liufau	7	2014	California
2	Chris Brown	6	2001	Nebraska

== Defense ==
=== Interceptions ===
Career
Rank	Player	Ints	Years
1	John Stearns	16	1970 1971 1972
2	Chris Hudson	15	1991 1992 1993 1994
3	Dick Anderson	14	1965 1966 1967
	Terrence Wheatley	14	2003 2004 2006 2007
5	Tim James	13	1987 1988 1989 1990
	Tedric Thompson	13	2013 2014 2015 2016
7	Deon Figures	12	1988 1990 1991 1992
8	Steve Rosga	11	1994 1995 1996
	Ben Kelly	11	1997 1998 1999
10	Roy Shepherd	10	1950 1951 1952
	Boyd Dowler	10	1956 1957 1958
	Cullen Bryant	10	1970 1971 1972
	Victor Scott	10	1980 1981 1982 1983

Single season
Rank	Player	Ints	Year
1	Dick Anderson	7	1967
	Cullen Bryant	7	1972
	Tedric Thompson	7	2016
4	John Stearns	6	1972
	Tim James	6	1990
	Deon Figures	6	1992

Single game
Rank	Player	Ints	Year	Opponent
1	Malcolm Miller	3	1949	Kansas
	Roy Shepherd	3	1952	Colorado State
	Frank Bernardi	3	1953	Utah
	Carroll Hardy	3	1953	Utah
	Dick Anderson	3	1967	Oregon
	Rich Bland	3	1973	Air Force
	Victor Scott	3	1982	Oklahoma State
	Terrence Wheatley	3	2007	Texas Tech

=== Tackles ===
Career
Rank	Player	Tackles	Years
1	Barry Remington	493	1982 1983 1984 1985 1986
2	Matt Russell	446	1993 1994 1995 1996
3	Greg Biekert	441	1989 1990 1991 1992
4	Jordon Dizon	440	2004 2005 2006 2007
5	Ted Johnson	409	1991 1992 1993 1994
6	Laval Short	372	1976 1977 1978 1979
7	Chad Brown	369	1989 1990 1991 1992
8	Michael Jones	349	1986 1987 1988 1989
9	Thaddeus Washington	338	2003 2004 2005 2006
10	Michael Lewis	336	1998 1999 2000 2001

Single season
Rank	Player	Tackles	Year
1	Ray Cone	183	1982
2	Ryan Sutter	170	1997
3	Bill Roe	162	1979
4	Barry Remington	162	1985
5	Jordon Dizon	160	2007
6	Ryan Black	154	1996
7	Greg Biekert	150	1990
8	Eric McCarty	148	1987
9	Ted Johnson	147	1994
10	Jeff Geiser	146	1973

Single game
Rank	Player	Tackles	Year	Opponent
1	Jeff Geiser	30	1973	Kansas State
2	Ryan Sutter	28	1997	Michigan
	Hannibal Navies	28	1997	Missouri
4	Lennie Ciufo	25	1973	Oklahoma State
	Brian Cabral	25	1977	Stanford
6	Jeff Geiser	24	1973	Oklahoma
	Bill Roe	24	1979	Kansas State
	Don DeLuzio	24	1986	Oregon

=== Sacks ===
Career
Rank	Player	Sacks	Years
1	Alfred Williams	35.0	1987 1988 1989 1990
2	Ron Woolfork	33.0	1990 1991 1992 1993
3	Greg Jones	25.0	1992 1994 1995 1996
4	Laval Short	24.5	1976 1977 1978 1979
5	Abraham Wright	21.0	2004 2005 2006
6	Herb Orvis	20.0	1969 1970 1971
	Dan McMillen	20.0	1982 1983 1984 1985
	Chidera Uzo-Diribe	20.0	2010 2011 2012 2013
	Jimmie Gilbert	20.0	2013 2014 2015 2016
10	Bill Brundige	19.0	1967 1968 1969
	Curt Koch	19.0	1984 1985 1986 1987
	Leonard Renfro	19.0	1989 1990 1991 1992

Single season
Rank	Player	Sacks	Year
1	Dan McMillen	14.0	1985
2	Ron Woolfork	13.5	1992
3	Bill Brundige	13.0	1969
	Ron Woolfork	13.0	1991
5	Alfred Williams	12.5	1990
6	Abraham Wright	11.5	2006
7	Alfred Williams	10.5	1989
	Leonard Renfro	10.5	1992
	Jimmie Gilbert	10.5	2016
10	Curt Koch	10.0	1986
	Garry Howe	10.0	1990

Single game
Rank	Player	Sacks	Year	Opponent
1	Bill Brundige	5.0	1969	Alabama
	Dan McMillen	5.0	1985	Kansas
3	Ron Woolfork	4.5	1992	Iowa
4	Bill Brundige	4.0	1969	Iowa State

== Kicking ==
=== Field goals made ===
Career
Rank	Player	FGs	Years
1	Mason Crosby	66	2003 2004 2005 2006
2	Will Oliver	50	2011 2012 2013
3	Jeremy Aldrich	48	1996 1997 1998 1999
4	Tom Field	36	1979 1980 1982 1983
5	James Stefanou	34	2017 2018 2019 2020
6	Alejandro Mata	31	2023 2024 2025
7	Aric Goodman	25	2008 2009 2010
8	Cole Becker	25	2021 2022
9	Ken Culbertson	23	1986 1987 1988 1989
10	Jim Harper	22	1990 1991
	Neil Voskeritchian	22	1994 1995

Single season
Rank	Player	FGs	Year
1	Mason Crosby	21	2005
2	Mason Crosby	19	2004
	Mason Crosby	19	2006
4	Jeremy Flores	18	2001
	Diego Gonzalez	18	2015
6	Will Oliver	17	2013
	James Stefanou	17	2017
8	Jeremy Aldrich	16	1998
	Jeremy Aldrich	16	1999
	Will Oliver	16	2014

Single game
Rank	Player	FGs	Year	Opponent
1	Jeremy Aldrich	5	1999	Kansas
	Kevin Eberhart	5	2007	Baylor

=== Field goal percentage ===
Career
Rank	Player	FG%	Years
1	Alejandro Mata	81.6%	2023 2024 2025
2	Cole Becker	75.8%	2021 2022
3	Jeremy Aldrich	75.0%	1996 1997 1998 1999
	Mason Crosby	75.0%	2003 2004 2005 2006
5	Will Oliver	72.5%	2011 2012 2013
6	James Stefanou	69.4%	2017 2018 2019 2020
7	Tom Field	65.5%	1979 1980 1982 1983
8	Neil Voskeritchian	64.7%	1994 1995
9	Diego Gonzalez	63.6%	2014 2015 2016
10	Jim Harper	62.9%	1990 1991

Single season
Rank	Player	FG%	Year
1	Jeremy Aldrich	85.7%	1997
