= 2011 Colorado Buffaloes football team =

American college football season

2011 Colorado Buffaloes football
- Conference: Pac-12 Conference
- South Division
- Record: 3–10 (2–7 Pac-12)
- Head coach: Jon Embree (1st season)
- Offensive coordinator: Eric Bieniemy (1st season)
- Defensive coordinator: Greg Brown (1st season)
- MVPs: Toney Clemons; Tyler Hansen
- Captains: Tyler Hansen; Jon Major; Ryan Miller; Anthony Perkins
- Home stadium: Folsom Field

2011 Pac-12 Conference football standings
	Conf.			Overall
Team	W		L	W		L
North Division
No. 4 Oregon xy$	8	–	1	12	–	2
No. 7 Stanford x%	8	–	1	11	–	2
Washington	5	–	4	7	–	6
California	4	–	5	7	–	6
Oregon State	3	–	6	3	–	9
Washington State	2	–	7	4	–	8
South Division
No. 6 USC †	7	–	2	10	–	2
UCLA xy	5	–	4	6	–	8
Utah	4	–	5	8	–	5
Arizona State	4	–	5	6	–	7
Arizona	2	–	7	4	–	8
Colorado	2	–	7	3	–	10
Championship: Oregon 49, UCLA 31
$ – BCS representative as conference champion; % – BCS at-large representative; x – Division champion/co-champions; y – Championship game participant; † – USC ineligible for championship and postseason due to NCAA sanctions; Rankings from AP Poll

The 2011 Colorado Buffaloes football team represented the University of Colorado at Boulder in the 2011 NCAA Division I FBS football season. Led by first-year head coach and alumnus Jon Embree, the Buffaloes played their home games on-campus at Folsom Field in Boulder and were first-year members of the newly expanded Pac-12 Conference. They finished with a record of 3–10, 2–7 in Pac-12 play, in a tie for last place in the South Division.

== Preseason ==
=== Recruiting ===
National Signing Day was on February 2, 2011 and Colorado signed high school athletes from around the country.

College recruiting (2011)
Name	Hometown	School	Height	Weight	40^{‡}	Commit date
Brent Burnette; QB	Maryville, TN	Arizona Western College	6 ft 3 in (1.91 m)	210 lb (95 kg)	–	Jan 7, 2011
Brent Burnette; QB	Recruit ratings: Scout: Rivals:					
Paulay Asiata; OL	Honolulu, HI	Saint Louis School	6 ft 5 in (1.96 m)	295 lb (134 kg)	–	Feb 2, 2011
Paulay Asiata; OL	Recruit ratings: Scout: Rivals: ESPN: (76)					
Jermaine Clark; ATH/OLB	Winston-Salem, NC	Oak Ridge Military Academy	6 ft 2 in (1.88 m)	200 lb (91 kg)	4.70/4.6	Jan 23, 2011
Jermaine Clark; ATH/OLB	Recruit ratings: Scout: Rivals: (45)					
Malcolm Creer; RB	Los Angeles, CA	Palisades Charter High School	5 ft 11 in (1.80 m)	200 lb (91 kg)	4.52	Feb 2, 2011
Malcolm Creer; RB	Recruit ratings: Scout: Rivals: (45)					
Brady Daigh; LB	Denver, CO	Mullen High School	6 ft 2 in (1.88 m)	222 lb (101 kg)	4.7/4.80	Jul 15, 2010
Brady Daigh; LB	Recruit ratings: Scout: Rivals: ESPN: (73)					
Steve Dorman; QB	Somerset, TX	Somerset High School	6 ft 4 in (1.93 m)	210 lb (95 kg)	4.8	Jan 14, 2011
Steve Dorman; QB	Recruit ratings: Scout: Rivals: ESPN: (72)					
Woodson Greer; LB	Gardena, CA	Junípero Serra High School	6 ft 2 in (1.88 m)	215 lb (98 kg)	4.7	Jan 17, 2011
Woodson Greer; LB	Recruit ratings: Scout: Rivals: ESPN: (74)					
Rashad Hall; RB	Forest, VA	Oak Ridge Military Academy	6 ft 0 in (1.83 m)	195 lb (88 kg)	–	Jan 23, 2011
Rashad Hall; RB	Recruit ratings: Scout: Rivals: ESPN: (77)					
Will Harlos; OLB	Somerset, TX	Somerset High School	6 ft 3 in (1.91 m)	200 lb (91 kg)	4.5/4.60	Jan 31, 2011
Will Harlos; OLB	Recruit ratings: Scout: Rivals: ESPN: (76)					
Sherrard Harrington; DB	Washington, D.C.	Howard D. Woodson High School	6 ft 1 in (1.85 m)	170 lb (77 kg)	4.4	Jan 15, 2011
Sherrard Harrington; DB	Recruit ratings: Rivals: ESPN: (77)					
Gregory Henderson; DB/CB	Norco, CA	Norco High School	5 ft 10 in (1.78 m)	180 lb (82 kg)	–	Jan 22, 2011
Gregory Henderson; DB/CB	Recruit ratings: Scout: Rivals: ESPN: (66)					
Alex Kelley; OL/C	Vista, CA	Vista High School	6 ft 3 in (1.91 m)	295 lb (134 kg)	–	Oct 4, 2010
Alex Kelley; OL/C	Recruit ratings: Scout: Rivals: ESPN: (75)					
Marc Mustoe; OL/OT	Arvada, CO	Arvada West High School	6 ft 7 in (2.01 m)	270 lb (120 kg)	5.3	Dec 11, 2010
Marc Mustoe; OL/OT	Recruit ratings: Scout: Rivals: ESPN: (78)					
Stephan Nembot; DE	Van Nuys, CA	Montclair College Preparatory School	6 ft 8 in (2.03 m)	280 lb (130 kg)	–	Feb 2, 2011
Stephan Nembot; DE	Recruit ratings: Scout: Rivals: ESPN: (78)					
Will Oliver; K	North Hollywood, CA	Harvard-Westlake School	5 ft 10 in (1.78 m)	190 lb (86 kg)	–	Jan 26, 2011
Will Oliver; K	Recruit ratings: Scout: Rivals: ESPN: (75)					
Juda Parker; DE	Honolulu, HI	Saint Louis School	6 ft 2 in (1.88 m)	230 lb (100 kg)	–	Feb 1, 2011
Juda Parker; DE	Recruit ratings: Scout: Rivals: ESPN: (75)					
Nelson Spruce; WR	Westlake Village, CA	Westlake High School	6 ft 2 in (1.88 m)	190 lb (86 kg)	4.5	Dec 18, 2010
Nelson Spruce; WR	Recruit ratings: Scout: Rivals: ESPN: (75)					
K.T. Tuumalo; LB	Honolulu, HI	Punahou School	6 ft 2 in (1.88 m)	200 lb (91 kg)	4.7	Jan 19, 2011
K.T. Tuumalo; LB	Recruit ratings: Scout: Rivals: ESPN: (68)					
Kyle Washington; ATH	Florence, AZ	Florence High School	6 ft 1 in (1.85 m)	190 lb (86 kg)	4.70	Jan 30, 2011
Kyle Washington; ATH	Recruit ratings: Scout: Rivals: (45)					
Overall recruit ranking: Scout: 61
‡ Refers to 40-yard dash; Note: In many cases, Scout, Rivals, 247Sports, On3, and ESPN may conflict in their listings of height, weight and 40 time.; In these cases, the average was taken. ESPN grades are on a 100-point scale.; Sources: "2011 Colorado Recruits". Scout.; "Scout.com Team Recruiting Rankings". Scout.; "2011 Team Ranking". Rivals.com.

== Schedule ==
Date	Time	Opponent	Site	TV	Result	Attendance	Source
September 3	8:15 p.m.	at Hawaii*	Aloha Stadium; Halawa, HI	ESPN2	L 17–34	37,001	
September 10	1:30 p.m.	California*	Folsom Field; Boulder, CO	FCS	L 33–36 ^{OT}	49,532	
September 17	11:30 a.m.	vs. Colorado State*	Sports Authority Field at Mile High; Denver, CO (Rocky Mountain Showdown)	FSN	W 28–14	57,186	
September 24	1:30 p.m.	at Ohio State*	Ohio Stadium; Columbus, OH	ABC/ESPN2	L 17–37	105,096	
October 1	1:30 p.m.	Washington State	Folsom Field; Boulder, CO	FCS	L 27–31	51,928	
October 8	5:30 p.m.	at No. 7 Stanford	Stanford Stadium; Stanford, CA	Versus	L 7–48	50,360	
October 15	1:30 p.m.	at Washington	Husky Stadium; Seattle, WA	RTRM	L 24–52	62,147	
October 22	1:30 p.m.	No. 9 Oregon^{†}	Folsom Field; Boulder, CO	FSN	L 2–45	52,123	
October 29	4:30 p.m.	at No. 23 Arizona State	Sun Devil Stadium; Tempe, AZ	RTRM	L 14–48	53,168	
November 4	7:00 p.m.	No. 21 USC	Folsom Field; Boulder, CO	ESPN	L 17–42	50,083	
November 12	12:30 p.m.	Arizona	Folsom Field; Boulder, CO	FCS	W 48–29	48,111	
November 19	5:30 p.m.	at UCLA	Rose Bowl; Pasadena, CA	Versus	L 6–45	57,344	
November 25	1:30 p.m.	at Utah	Rice–Eccles Stadium; Salt Lake City, UT (Rumble in the Rockies)	FSN	W 17–14	45,026	
*Non-conference game; ^{†}Homecoming; Rankings from AP Poll released prior to the game; All times are in Mountain time

The California game on September 10 was designated as non-conference

== Game summaries ==
=== Hawaii ===
	1	2	3	4	Total
Buffaloes	0	0	14	3	17
Warriors	3	14	7	10	34

Colorado lost their 18th consecutive road game with their 34–17 loss to Hawaii on September 3 in Jon Embree's debut as Colorado head coach. The Buffaloes' last road win came on October 27, 2007 against Texas Tech. Hawaii quarterback Bryant Moniz ran for a career-best 121 yards and three touchdowns and threw for one touchdown and 20 completions on 33 attempts. Although Hawaii led most of the evening, Colorado made it interesting at the start of the fourth quarter, and took advantage of a fumble by Moniz; the Buffaloes cut the lead to 24–17 with a 34-yard field goal by placekicker Will Oliver. That was the last Colorado score, as Hawaii scored the game's last 10 points to secure the win.

Scoring summary

Quarter	Time	Drive			Team	Scoring information	Score	
Quarter	Time	Plays	Yards	TOP	Team	Scoring information	Colorado	Hawaii
1	9:49	9	63	3:16	Hawaii	38-yard field goal by Kenton Chun	0	3
2	10:39	1	57	0:10	Hawaii	Bryant Moniz 57-yard touchdown run, Kenton Chun kick good	0	10
2	0:24	7	87	1:50	Hawaii	Bryant Moniz 14-yard touchdown run, Kenton Chun kick good	0	17
3	12:02	6	73	2:50	Colorado	Paul Richardson 15-yard touchdown reception from Tyler Hansen, Will Oliver kick good	7	17
3	5:59	10	48	5:53	Hawaii	Bryant Moniz 1-yard touchdown run, Kenton Chun kick good	7	24
3	1:51	4	63	1:08	Colorado	Paul Richardson 21-yard touchdown reception from Tyler Hansen, Will Oliver kick good	14	24
4	14:51	5	17	1:53	Colorado	34-yard field goal by Will Oliver	17	24
4	6:17	8	45	4:05	Hawaii	Joey Iosefa 22-yard touchdown reception from Bryant Moniz, Kenton Chun kick good	17	31
4	4:52	4	6	0:16	Hawaii	22-yard field goal by Tyler Hadden	17	34
"TOP" = time of possession. For other American football terms, see Glossary of American football.							17	34

=== California ===
	1	2	3	4	OT	Total
Golden Bears	0	16	7	7	6	36
Buffaloes	3	3	14	10	3	33

Although both teams are members of the Pac-12, this game counted as a non-conference game in the standings as this game was scheduled before Colorado joined the Pac-12.

Things started off rough for Cal, but after a failure at 4th and goal for Colorado and later a field goal, Cal capitalized on the momentum shift and raced out to a 16–6 lead at halftime. Cal continue to score, but the Buffaloes rebounded strongly by outgaining Cal offensively and later tied the game. In overtime, Colorado was held to a field goal and Zach Maynard later connected to Keenan Allen for a game-winning touchdown.

Scoring summary

Quarter	Time	Drive			Team	Scoring information	Score	
Quarter	Time	Plays	Yards	TOP	Team	Scoring information	California	Colorado
1	2:51	6	50	2:15	Colorado	27-yard field goal by Will Oliver	0	3
2	14:14	10	81	3:33	California	Nico Dumont 2-yard touchdown reception from Zach Maynard, Gior Tavecchio kick no good (blocked)	6	3
2	9:21	7	52	2:22	California	39-yard field goal by Gior Tavecchio	9	3
2	4:18	11	46	5:03	Colorado	52-yard field goal by Will Oliver	9	6
2	1:13	7	62	2:49	California	Anthony Miller 7-yard touchdown reception from Zach Maynard, Gior Tavecchio kick good	16	6
3	10:30	10	80	4:30	Colorado	Ryan Deehan 37-yard touchdown reception from Tyler Hansen, Will Oliver kick good	16	13
3	4:28	4	35	1:52	California	Anthony Miller 20-yard touchdown reception from Zach Maynard, Gior Tavecchio kick good	23	13
3	1:41	8	86	2:41	Colorado	Paul Richardson 66-yard touchdown reception from Tyler Hansen, Will Oliver kick good	23	20
4	14:48	2	78	0:52	Colorado	Paul Richardson 78-yard touchdown reception from Tyler Hansen, Will Oliver kick good	23	27
4	9:55	11	80	4:53	California	C.J. Anderson 19-yard touchdown run, Gior Tavecchio kick good	30	27
4	0:30	16	70	6:40	Colorado	32-yard field goal by Will Oliver	30	30
OT		6	20		Colorado	22-yard field goal by Will Oliver	30	33
OT		6	25		California	Keenan Allen 5-yard touchdown reception from Zach Maynard, no kick attempt	36	33
"TOP" = time of possession. For other American football terms, see Glossary of American football.							36	33

=== Colorado State ===
Team	1	2	3	4	Total
Colorado State	7	0	0	7	14
• Colorado	0	14	7	7	28

- Date: September 17
- Location: Sports Authority Field at Mile High, Denver, CO
- Game start: 1:30 p.m. EST

Scoring summary
1	10:01	CSU	Pete Thomas 4-yard run (Ben DeLine kick)	CSU 7-0
2	2:37	COL	Tyler Hansen 2-yard run (Will Oliver kick)	Tied 7-7
2	0:12	COL	Kyle Cefalo 24-yard pass from Tyler Hansen (Will Oliver kick)	COL 14-7
3	3:16	COL	Toney Clemons 44-yard pass from Tyler Hansen (Will Oliver kick)	COL 21-7
4	14:20	CSU	Crockett Gilmore 23-yard pass from Charlie Lovett (Ben DeLine kick)	COL 21-14
4	1:15	COL	Tyler Hansen 2-yard run (Will Oliver kick)	COL 28-14

=== Ohio State ===
	1	2	3	4	Total
Buffaloes	0	7	3	7	17
Buckeyes	10	10	14	3	37

=== Washington State ===
	1	2	3	4	Total
Cougars	7	3	7	14	31
Buffaloes	3	10	7	7	27

=== Stanford ===
	1	2	3	4	Total
Buffaloes	0	7	0	0	7
#7 Cardinal	13	14	14	7	48

=== Washington ===
	1	2	3	4	Total
Buffaloes	7	3	7	7	24
Huskies	21	17	7	7	52

=== Oregon ===
	1	2	3	4	Total
#9 Ducks	29	6	10	0	45
Buffaloes	0	0	2	0	2

Notes: Darragh O'Neill punts four balls inside the five yard-line, one causing the Ducks to retreat in their end zone from the momentum of the punt, and them being tackled forcing a safety, the Buffaloes' only score.

=== Arizona State ===
	1	2	3	4	Total
Buffaloes	0	7	0	7	14
#23 Sun Devils	21	10	10	7	48

=== USC ===
	1	2	3	4	Total
#21 Trojans	7	21	7	7	42
Buffaloes	7	3	0	7	17

=== Arizona ===
Team	1	2	3	4	Total
Arizona	3	7	7	12	29
• Colorado	7	13	14	14	48

- Date: November 12
- Location: Folsom Field, Boulder, CO
- Game start: 2:30 p.m. EST

Scoring summary
1	10:56	COL	Rodney Stewart 5-yard run (Will Oliver kick)	COL 7-0
1	4:15	ARIZ	John Bonano 25-yard field goal	COL 7-3
2	13:18	COL	Tony Jones 5-yard pass from Tyler Hansen (kick failed)	COL 13-3
2	6:28	ARIZ	Ka'Deem Carey 1-yard run (John Bonano kick)	COL 13-10
2	2:12	COL	Josh Ford 17-yard run (Will Oliver kick)	COL 20-10
3	10:26	COL	Toney Clemons 15-yard pass from Tyler Hansen (Will Oliver kick)	COL 27-10
3	3:50	COL	Tyler Hansen 14-yard pass from Rodney Stewart (Will Oliver kick)	COL 34-10
3	0:11	ARIZ	Tra'Mayne 29-yard interception return (John Bonano kick)	COL 34-17
4	10:33	ARIZ	David Douglas 11-yard pass from Nick Foles (pass failed)	COL 34-23
4	7:42	COL	Rodney Stewart 11-yard run (Will Oliver kick)	COL 41-23
4	4:14	ARIZ	Ka'Deem Carey 2-yard run (pass failed)	COL 41-29
4	1:45	COL	Rodney Stewart 9-yard run (Will Oliver kick)	COL 48-29

Colorado recorded their first ever Pac-12 win and avoided the first winless season in Folsom Field history.

=== UCLA ===
	1	2	3	4	Total
Buffaloes	0	6	0	0	6
Bruins	21	0	3	21	45

First Quarter scoring: UCLA – Shaqell Evans 54-yard pass from Kevin Prince (Tyler Gonzalez kick); UCLA – Johnathan Franklin 14-yard run (Gonzalez kick); UCLA – Joseph Fauria 5-yard pass from Prince (Gonzalez kick)

Second Quarter scoring: CU – Toney Clemons 20-yard pass from Tyler Hansen ( Will Oliver kick failed)

Third Quarter scoring: UCLA – Gonzalez 22-yard field goal

Fourth Quarter scoring: UCLA – Fauria 15-yard pass from Prince (Gonzalez kick); UCLA – Nelson Rosario 11-yard pass from Prince (Gonzalez kick); UCLA – Malcolm Jones 1-yard run (Gonzalez kick)

=== Utah ===
Team	1	2	3	4	Total
• Colorado	7	3	7	0	17
Utah	0	0	14	0	14

- Date: November 25
- Location: Rice-Eccles Stadium, Salt Lake City, UT
- Game start: 1:30 p.m. MST

Scoring summary
1	9:08	COL	Tyler Hansen 1-yard run (Will Oliver kick)	COL 7-0
2	7:09	COL	Will Oliver 23-yard field goal	COL 10-0
3	10:29	UTAH	Tauni Vakapuna 3-yard run (Coleman Petersen kick)	COL 10-7
3	4:47	COL	Evan Harrington 1-yard pass from Tyler Hansen (Will Oliver kick)	COL 17-7
3	0:54	UTAH	Shawn Asiata 6-yard pass from Jon Hays (Coleman Petersen kick)	COL 17-14

== Roster ==
2011 Colorado Buffaloes football team roster
Players
Coaches
Offense

Pos.	#	Name	Class
OL	63	Ethan Adkins	Sr
FB	47	Tyler Ahles	Sr
TB	33	Cordary Allen	Fr
OL	50	Paulay Asiata	Fr
TE	43	Matthew Bahr	Sr
OL	59	David Bakhtari	So
OL	66	Blake Behrens	Sr
QB	10	Brent Burnette	Jr
WR	4	Keenan Canty	Fr
WR	35	Kyle Cefalo	Sr
OL	60	David Clark	Sr
WR	17	Toney Clemons	Sr
C	64	Brad Cotner	Fr
OL	54	Kaiwi Crabb	Fr
TB	44	Malcolm Creer	Fr
OL	68	Shawn Daniels	Sr
OL	53	Ryan Dannewitz	Jr
WR	82	Jarrod Darden	So
TE	34	Ryan Deehan	Sr
QB	12	Stevie Joe Dorman	Fr
WR	89	Drew Ebner	Fr
WR	83	Dustin Ebner	Jr
WR	15	Jason Espinoza	Sr
TE	99	Scott Fernandez	So
TB	29	Josh Ford	So
ATH	22	D.D. Goodson	Fr
WR	2	Logan Gray	Sr
OL	76	Gus Handler	So
QB	9	Tyler Hansen	Sr
FB	49	Evan Harrington	Sr
OL	75	Jack Harris	So
QB	8	Nick Hirschman	Fr
TB	26	Tony Jones	Fr
OL	71	Alex Lewis	Fr
TB	20	Brian Lockridge	Sr
WR	87	Tyler McCulloch	Fr
OL	73	Ryan Miller	Sr
OL	52	Daniel Munyer	Fr
OL	72	Marc Mustoe	Fr
WR	27	Tommy Papillon	So
FB	38	Nick Plimpton	Fr
WR	6	Paul Richardson	So
QB	14	John Schrock	Fr
TE	88	Kyle Slavin	Fr
WR	22	Nelson Spruce	Fr
TB	5	Rodney Stewart	Sr
OL	79	Sione Tau	Sr
TE	85	DaVaughn Thornton	So
WR	86	Alex Turbow	So
WR	81	Austin Vincent	Fr
TE	84	Alex Wood	So

Defense

Pos.	#	Name	Class
DB	21	Jered Bell	So
DL	94	Nate Bonsu	So
DB	40	Brandon Brisco	Fr
DB	30	Jermane Clark	Fr
DT	50	Curtis Cunningham	Sr
LB	54	Brady Daigh	Fr
DB	27	Vince Ewing	Jr
OLB	55	David Goldberg	Sr
DB	14	Justin Gorman	Fr
LB	37	Woodson Greer	Fr
DB	28	Will Harlos	Fr
DB	23	Sherrad Harrington	Fr
OLB	17	Josh Hartigan	Sr
DB	18	Jonathan Hawkins	Sr
DB	20	Greg Henderson	Fr
DB	22	Arthur Jaffe	Sr
DE	44	Nick Kasa	Jr
DL	97	Kyle Koch	Fr
ILB	12	Patrick Mahnke	Sr
OLB	31	Jon Major	Jr
DB	36	Jordan Marquez	Fr
DB	39	Josh Moten	Fr
DE	90	Stephane Nembot	Fr
DE	58	Andre Nichols	Fr
OLB	48	Liloa Nobriga	So
DT	93	Conrad Obi	Sr
DB	25	Ayodeji Olatoye	So
DB	13	Parker Orms	So
OLB	2	Juda Parker	Fr
DT	83	Will Pericak	Jr
DB	7	Anthony Perkins	Sr
DB	26	Ray Polk	Jr
DE	95	Tony Poremba	Sr
DL	91	Kirk Poston	Fr
DB	16	Makiri Pugh	Jr
DL	70	Eric Richter	Jr
ILB	3	Douglas Rippy	Jr
DB	19	Travis Sandersfield	Sr
OLB	34	Hunter Shaw	Fr
DB	41	Terrel Smith	So
DB	38	River Thompson	Fr
LB	42	K.T. Tu'umalo	Fr
DE	51	John Tuso	Fr
DE	9	Chidera Uzo-Diribe	So
DB	32	Paul Vigo	So
LB	92	Casey Walker	Fr
DB	4	Kyle Washington	Fr
ILB	5	Derrick Webb	So
ILB	45	Lowell Williams	Fr
DB	33	Richard Yates	Fr

Special teams

Pos.	#	Name	Class
P	8	Mark Brundage	Sr
K	40	Justin Castor	So
P	15	Zach Grossnickle	So
LS	69	Ryan Iverson	So
LS	57	Clayton Jones	Fr
LS	65	Keegan LaMar	Fr
P	8	Darragh O'Neill	Fr
K	91	Will Oliver	Fr

Head coach

- Jon Embree

Coordinators/assistant coaches

- Eric Bieniemy – Offensive coordinator/running backs
- Greg Brown – Defensive coordinator/secondary
- Rip Scherer – Assistant head coach/quarterbacks
- J.D. Brookhart – Offensive passing game coordinator/tight ends/special teams
- Brian Cabral – Run game coordinator/linebackers
- Bobby Kennedy – Wide receivers
- Steve Marshall – Offensive line
- Kanavis McGhee – Defensive line
- Mike Tuiasosopo – Defensive line

Legend

- (C) Team captain
- (S) Suspended
- (I) Ineligible
- Injured
- Redshirt

Roster
