= Cody Hawkins =

American football player and coach (born 1988)

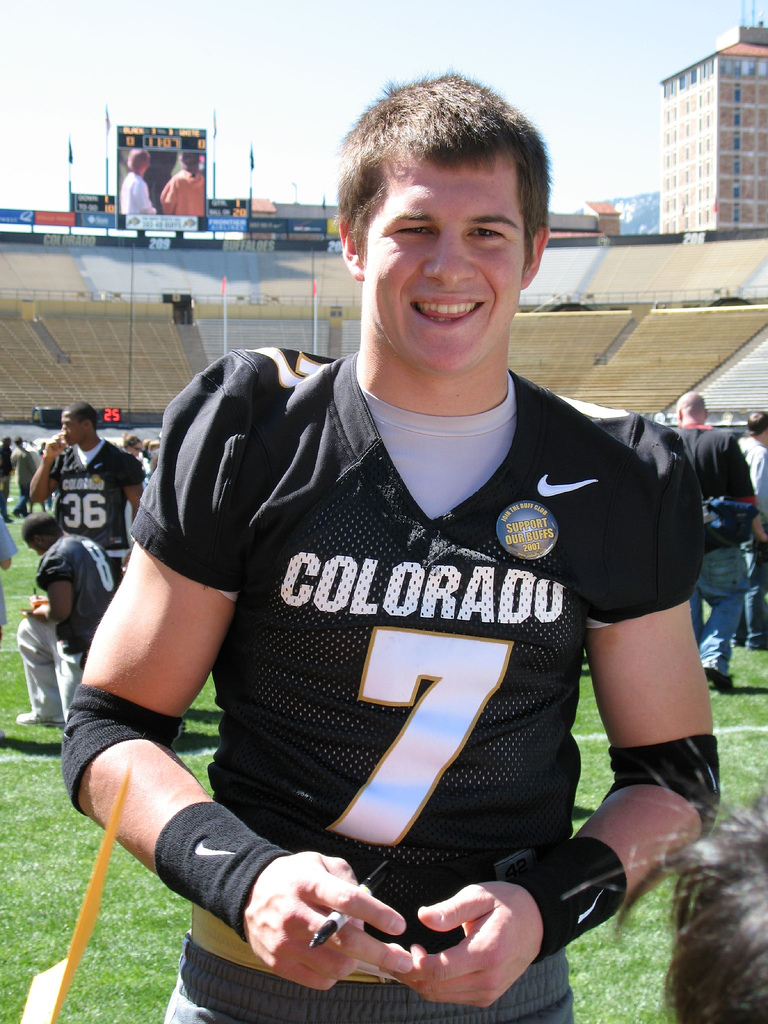
- Hawkins in 2007

Current position
- Title: Head coach
- Team: Idaho State
- Conference: Big Sky
- Record: 18–21

Biographical details
- Born: March 24, 1988 (age 38); Woodland, California, U.S.

Playing career
- 2006–2009: Colorado
- 2010–2011: Stockholm Mean Machines
- Position: Quarterback

Coaching career (HC unless noted)
- 2014: Ohio State (GA)
- 2015: Westview HS (OR) (assistant)
- 2017–2020: UC Davis (WR)
- 2021–2022: UC Davis (OC/QB)
- 2023–present: Idaho State

Head coaching record
- Overall: 18–21
Medal record
Men's American football
Representing United States
World Championship
Gold medal – first place	2011 Austria	Team competition

Cody Norman Hawkins (born March 24, 1988) is an American college football coach and a former professional and college football player who is currently the head coach at Idaho State University. Hawkins played as a quarterback for the Colorado Buffaloes and professionally in Sweden for the Stockholm Mean Machines in the Superserien league for two seasons. He is the son of former UC Davis head coach Dan Hawkins.

== High school ==
Hawkins never lost a football game while growing up, going 59–0 since beginning in sixth grade. He also lettered twice in basketball in high school.

In Boise, Idaho, Hawkins led Bishop Kelly High School to back-to-back undefeated state championships. He was also a two-time Idaho Statesman All-Idaho Football Team Player of the Year. In 2005, he threw for 42 touchdowns and 2,783 yards with 5 interceptions, earning him the 2005 Gatorade Idaho Player of the Year award. As a junior in 2004, he had 31 touchdowns and 8 interceptions for the Knights.

Hawkins was a highly touted prospect, and had official offers from Colorado, Boise State, Brigham Young, Oregon, and Louisiana–Lafayette, but only made official visits to Boise State and Colorado. More colleges were not interested because of his small size. He was an EA Sports Elite 11 quarterback (#4).

Hawkins was on a reality show called ESPNU Summer House, located in the Lincoln Park district in Chicago in 2006.

His father Dan was the head coach at Boise State and had offered him a scholarship to play there, which he accepted. However, when his father switched jobs to be the head coach at Colorado, he again offered his son a scholarship to play there. Cody Hawkins kept his decision on where to play until National Signing Day and even had signed both letters of intent (LOI). He surprised his father when he faxed in his LOI to Colorado, thus picking Colorado over Boise State. His father would later say, "I really didn’t know what he was going to do" about the surprise.

== College ==
In 2006, Hawkins redshirted and was selected for the Offensive Scout Award by his teammates for the season.

In 2007, heading into spring and fall practices, there was considerable discussion about who would be the starting quarterback for the season. The previous year's starter, Bernard Jackson, was still with the team, but was not considered the favorite to earn the position. Hawkins' competition, Nick Nelson, was a junior college transfer to the team. Because of the conflict of interest, his father had publicly stated he would leave the starting quarterback decision to the offensive coordinator, Mark Helfrich. The decision was not made until two weeks before the first game of the season.

This was the 20th time a coach would coach his own son at quarterback in NCAA Division I college football, the ninth son to be a starter.

Hawkins led the team to a 6–7 record for 2007, including the Independence Bowl against the Alabama Crimson Tide.

He set the Colorado record for most pass attempts (424) and 2nd most completions (239).

In 2008, Hawkins was, according to some, not automatically a lock to be the starter the season. Aside from continuing competition from Nick Nelson, Matt Ballenger was coming off of his redshirt season.

In 2009, after poor performances in the first four games of the season, Hawkins was replaced as the starter by Tyler Hansen on October 10 against Texas.

=== Statistics ===
Year	Team	Games		Passing								Rushing			
Year	Team	GP	Record	Comp	Att	Pct	Yards	Avg	TD	Int	Rate	Att	Yards	Avg	TD
2006	Colorado	DNP													
2007	Colorado	13	6–7	263	463	56.8	3,015	6.5	22	17	119.8	41	-19	-0.5	3
2008	Colorado	12	5–7	183	320	57.2	1,892	5.9	17	10	118.1	57	-23	-0.4	3
2009	Colorado	8	3–9	121	239	50.6	1,277	5.3	10	11	100.1	15	-93	-6.2	1
2010	Colorado	12	2–5	124	231	53.7	1,547	6.7	14	5	125.6	9	-32	-3.6	0
Career		45	16−28	691	1,253	55.1	7,731	6.2	63	43	116.7	122	-167	-1.4	7

== After college ==
In 2010, Hawkins accepted an offer to play professionally for the Stockholm Mean Machines of the Swedish Superserien league for two seasons. He was also named the quarterback for the US national team for the 2011 IFAF World Cup and as the quarterbacks coach for the same team, serving under his father, in the 2015 IFAF World Cup. In 2017, he joined the UC Davis Aggies, again serving under his father, and was subsequently promoted to assistant director of football operations and recruiting.

== Personal ==
Hawkins is one of four siblings. His oldest sister, Ashley, lives in Portland, Oregon, and works for Nike, and his other sister, Britney is married to Tim Brady, who played at Boise State. His younger brother Drew played football at Boise State. His father Dan played collegiately at UC Davis as a fullback, and was named head coach at Colorado in December 2005. His maternal uncle, Gen. Daniel R. Hokanson, is the current Chief of the National Guard Bureau and a member of the Joint Chiefs of Staff.

== Head coaching record ==
Year	Team	Overall	Conference	Standing	Bowl/playoffs
Idaho State Bengals (Big Sky Conference) (2023–present)
2023	Idaho State	3–8	3–5	T–9th	
2024	Idaho State	5–7	3–5	T–6th	
2025	Idaho State	6–6	5–3	T–4th	
2026	Idaho State	7–5	4–5	8th	FCS Playoffs First Round
Idaho State:		20–25	14–17		
Total:		20–25			
National championship Conference title Conference division title or championship game berth
^{#}Rankings from final Coaches Poll.
