= Scotty McKnight =

American football player (born 1988)

No. 21, 15
- Position: Wide receiver

Personal information
- Born: February 11, 1988 (age 38); Newport Beach, California, U.S.
- Listed height: 5 ft 11 in (1.80 m)
- Listed weight: 185 lb (84 kg)

Career information
- College: Colorado
- NFL draft: 2011: 7th round, 227th overall pick

Career history
- New York Jets (2011−2012)*
- * Offseason or practice squad member only
- Stats at Pro Football Reference

Scott Joseph McKnight (born February 11, 1988) is an American media executive and former football player. He played college football at Colorado and was selected by the New York Jets in the seventh round of the 2011 NFL draft.

== Early life ==
McKnight was born in Newport Beach, California on February 11, 1988.

== College football career ==
McKnight played college football at the University of Colorado, where he finished his career ranked first in receptions (215), first in receiving touchdowns (22), and third in all-time receiving yards (2,521), while becoming the tenth player in NCAA history to catch at least one pass in every game he appeared in (49) and the sixth to do so without missing any games due to injury. McKnight is the only player in Colorado history to lead the team in receptions for four straight seasons and Colorado's only three-time winner of the John Mack Award, after being honored as the team's most outstanding offensive player in 2008, 2009, and 2010. McKnight was one of CU's four team captains, as voted by teammates, in his senior season. Following his career, McKnight was awarded the inaugural Kordell Stewart Career Achievement Award, presented for outstanding career achievement.

=== Statistics ===
Season	Team	GP	Receiving		
Season	Team	GP	Rec	Yards	TD
2007	Colorado	13	47	555	4
2008	Colorado	12	46	519	5
2009	Colorado	12	76	895	6
2010	Colorado	12	50	621	7
Career		49	219	2,590	22

== NFL career ==
Pre-draft measurables
Height	Weight	40-yard dash	10-yard split	20-yard split	20-yard shuttle	Three-cone drill	Vertical jump	Broad jump	Bench press
5 ft 10 1/2 in (1.79 m)	182 lb (83 kg)	4.50 s	1.57 s	2.59 s	4.07 s	6.68 s	34.0 in (0.86 m)	10 ft 8 in (3.25 m)	13 reps
All values from Pro Day

McKnight was selected by the New York Jets in the seventh round of the 2011 NFL draft. McKnight joined best friend Mark Sanchez, whom McKnight has known since he was eight years old. McKnight signed a four-year contract on July 29, 2011. He was waived on September 2. McKnight was signed to the team's practice squad on September 20. He was placed on the practice squad injured reserve list on November 1, 2011, after suffering a torn ACL, MCL, PCL and meniscus in his left knee. McKnight was re-signed by the Jets on March 20, 2012. He was waived on August 6, 2012, after fracturing his left knee cap.

== Post-football career ==
McKnight began his entertainment career writing episodes of television for the CBS Network series, CSI: Cyber.

McKnight is the Founder & CEO of GOAT Farm Sports, a media company known for their work alongside NFL players and other notable professional athletes.

McKnight was an Executive Producer of the NFL Network documentary-series Destination Dallas, featuring a group of elite 2018 NFL Draft prospects including Derwin James, Fred Warner, Josh Rosen, Mark Andrews, Orlando Brown Jr, Will Hernandez, and Cedric Wilson Jr.

McKnight was Executive Producer of the documentary Next Level for Sports Illustrated. The film features Khalen Saunders and Keelan Doss, two NFL prospects from small colleges working to get drafted into the NFL.

McKnight was Executive Producer and Co-Writer of the Fox Network documentary Tua, featuring former University of Alabama QB, Tua Tagovailoa, as he recovers from a career-threatening injury and looks to fulfill a childhood prophecy during the 2020 NFL Draft. Tua was nominated for a 2021 Sports Emmy Award.

A 2023 Sports Illustrated article reported that Scotty McKnight is Producing a documentary with HBO and Warner Brothers chronicling the life of generational Quarterback prospect, Julian Lewis.

McKnight served as Executive Producer and Director of Culture of Winning: Polynesian Football Pride, a documentary exploring Polynesian culture and its impact on the sport of American Football. The film features top Polynesian NFL athletes including Tua Tagovailoa, Penei Sewell, Puka Nacua, and Jonah Savaiinaea, along with the No. 1 rated high school football prospect in America, Chris Henry Jr. The film aired on Fox Network and was produced by GOAT Farm Media in partnership with P&G Studios, dentsu, and SMAC Entertainment. Tagovailoa and Michael Strahan are credited as Executive Producers on the project.

McKnight helped create Exciting Mics, a podcast-series hosted by Philadelphia Eagles' Cooper DeJean and Reed Blankenship. McKnight serves as Executive Producer.

McKnight is an angel investor in the Connected Coaching technology platform, Asensei.

Year	Title	Network	Producer	Writer	Director	Notes
2015-2016	CSI: Cyber	CBS	No	Yes	No	Episodes "Flash Squad" "Fit-and-Run" and "The Walking Dead"
2018	Destination Dallas	NFL Network	Executive	No	No	Documentary-Series
2019	Next Level	Sports Illustrated	Executive	No	No	Documentary
2020	Tua	Fox	Executive	Yes	No	Documentary
2023	Julian Lewis Project	HBO	n/a	n/a	n/a	Documentary
2025	Culture of Winning	Fox	Executive	No	Yes	Documentary

Awards and nominations

Year	Award	Category	Film	Result
2021	Sports Emmy Awards	Outstanding Camera Work - Long Form	Tua	Nominated
