= Paul Richardson (American football) =

American football player (born 1992)

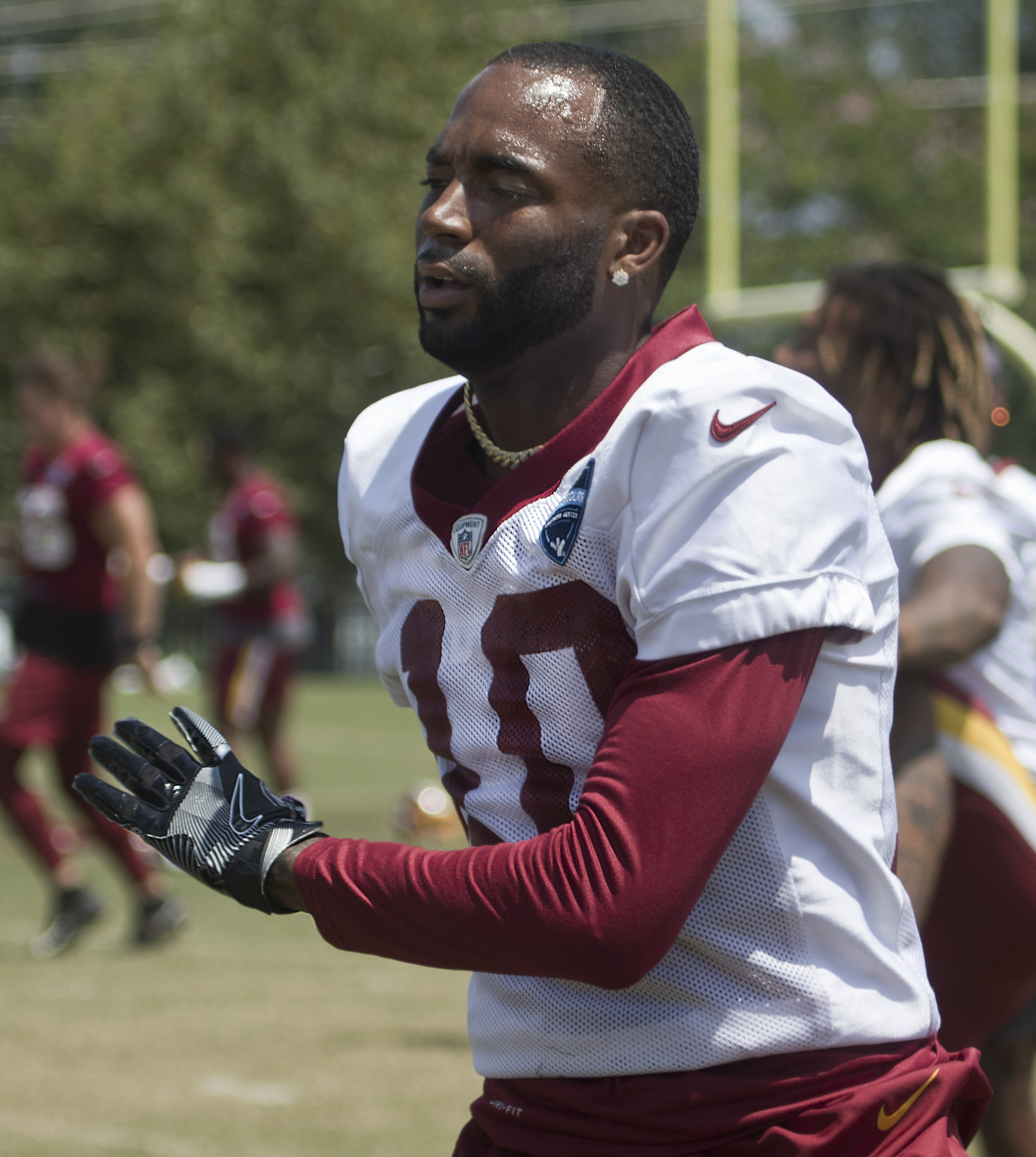
- Richardson with the Washington Redskins in 2018

No. 10
- Position: Wide receiver

Personal information
- Born: April 13, 1992 (age 34); Los Angeles, California, U.S.
- Listed height: 6 ft 0 in (1.83 m)
- Listed weight: 180 lb (82 kg)

Career information
- High school: Junípero Serra (Gardena, California)
- College: Colorado (2010–2013)
- NFL draft: 2014: 2nd round, 45th overall pick

Career history
- Seattle Seahawks (2014–2017); Washington Redskins (2018–2019); Seattle Seahawks (2020)*
- * Offseason or practice squad member only

Awards and highlights
- First-team All-Pac-12 (2013)

Career NFL statistics
- Receptions: 143
- Receiving yards: 1,809
- Receiving touchdowns: 12
- Stats at Pro Football Reference

Paul Richardson Jr. (born April 13, 1992) is an American former professional football player who was a wide receiver in the National Football League (NFL). He played college football for the Colorado Buffaloes and was selected by the Seattle Seahawks in the second round of the 2014 NFL draft. He also played for the Washington Redskins.

== Early life ==
Richardson attended Junípero Serra High School in Gardena, California and Los Alamitos High School in Los Alamitos, California. During his high school career, he had 110 receptions for 1,948 yards and 28 touchdowns. He was also a letterman in basketball and track. In track, he had career-bests of 10.62 in the 100 meters, 21 seconds in the 200 meters and 40.66 seconds in the 4x100.

== College career ==
Richardson originally attended UCLA, but was dismissed from the team prior to his freshman season after being placed under arrest for felony theft of a purse, along with his cousin Shaquille Richardson and another teammate, Josh Shirley. He then attended the University of Colorado Boulder. He played in all 12 games that year, recording 34 receptions for 514 yards and six touchdowns. As a sophomore in 2011, he played in nine games recording 39 receptions for 555 yards and five touchdowns. He missed four games due to injury. In April 2012, he tore his ACL which caused him to miss the season. He returned as a starter in 2013. During the season, he set the school record for receiving yards in a season of 1,343 yards. At the end of the season, Richardson announced his intent to declare for the 2014 NFL draft.

=== College statistics ===
Year	Team	Conf	Class	Pos	G	Rec	Yds	Avg	TD
2010	Colorado	Big 12	FR	WR	12	34	514	15.1	6
2011	Colorado	Pac-12	SO	WR	9	39	555	14.2	5
2013	Colorado	Pac-12	JR	WR	12	83	1,343	16.2	10
Career					33	156	2,412	15.5	21

== Professional career ==
Pre-draft measurables
Height	Weight	Arm length	Hand span	Wingspan	40-yard dash	10-yard split	20-yard split	20-yard shuttle	Three-cone drill	Vertical jump	Broad jump
6 ft 0 3/8 in (1.84 m)	175 lb (79 kg)	32 5/8 in (0.83 m)	8 7/8 in (0.23 m)	6 ft 4 1/4 in (1.94 m)	4.40 s	1.56 s	2.58 s	4.23 s	6.98 s	38.0 in (0.97 m)	10 ft 4 in (3.15 m)
All values from NFL Combine/Pro Day

=== Seattle Seahawks (first stint) ===
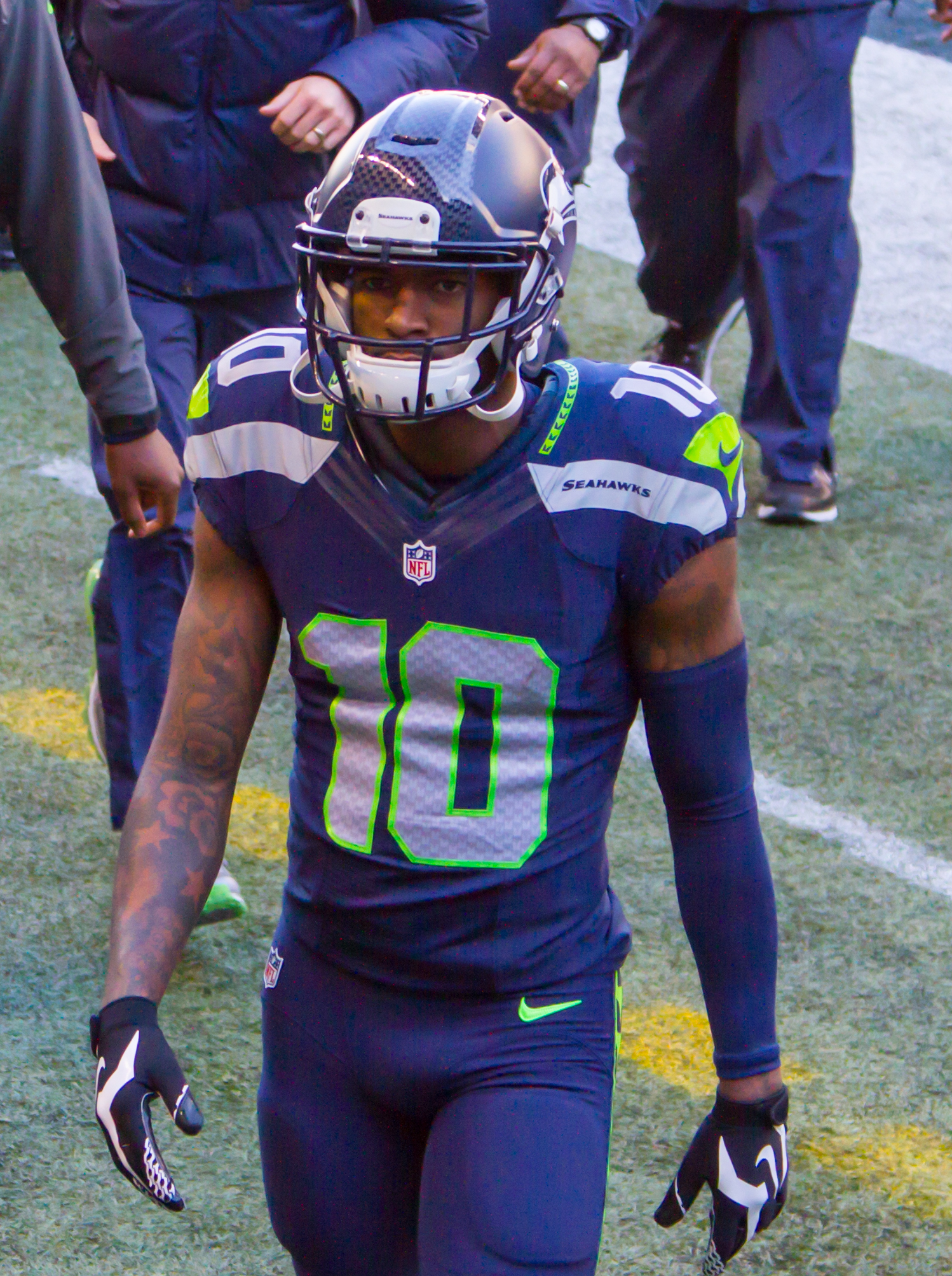
Richardson with the Seattle Seahawks in 2014

Richardson was selected by the Seattle Seahawks in the second round (45th overall) in the 2014 NFL draft. He made his NFL debut in the season opener against the Green Bay Packers but was not targeted. In Week 3 against the Denver Broncos, Richardson caught his first career NFL reception, which was for seven yards. In Week 13, he caught what would have been his first NFL touchdown, but it was called back due to a penalty. During Week 15, he caught his first NFL touchdown against the San Francisco 49ers. Richardson finished with 29 receptions, 271 yards, and a touchdown in his rookie season. In Seattle's opening Divisional Round matchup against the Carolina Panthers, after only having one reception for 21 yards, he went down in the third quarter with what was first believed to be a sprained knee at the time, was later revealed to be a torn ACL upon further inspection. He was then placed on injured reserve, ending his 2014–15 rookie campaign. On December 5, 2015, after making a 40-yard catch, Richardson hurt his hamstring and was subsequently placed on injured reserve.

Richardson had a relatively quiet season again in 2016, until starting wide receiver Tyler Lockett suffered a season-ending injury in Week 16. In the Wild Card Round of the playoffs against the Detroit Lions, he recorded three catches for 48 yards, including a one-handed touchdown catch on 4th and goal.

In 2017, Richardson had his best season to date with career highs with receptions (44), receiving yards (703), and touchdowns (6).

=== Washington Redskins ===
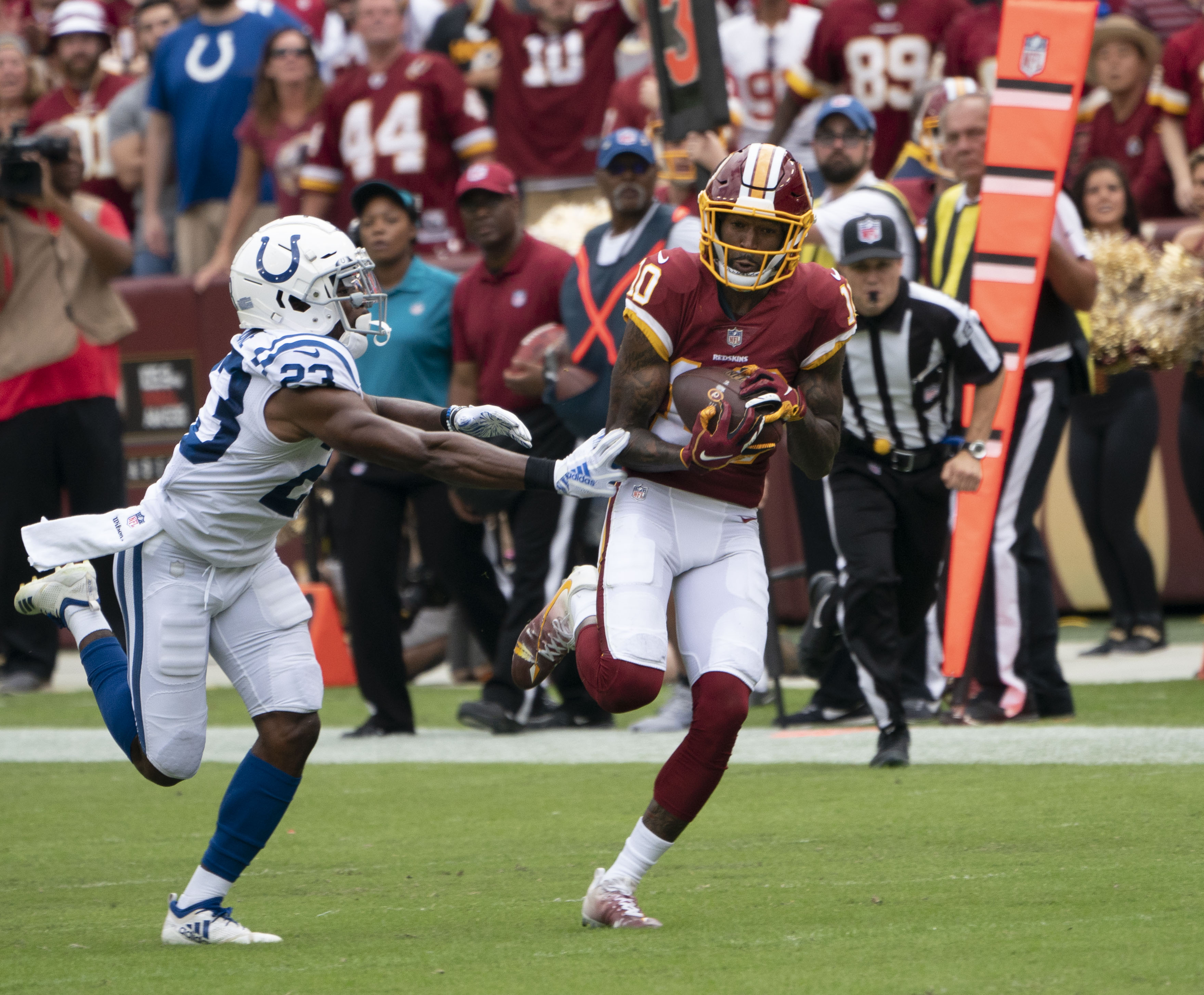
Richardson (right) with the Washington Redskins in 2018

Richardson signed a five-year, $40 million contract with the Washington Redskins on March 15, 2018. On September 9, 2018, Richardson made his Redskins debut, catching four passes for 22 yards in the season-opening win against the Arizona Cardinals. On September 16, Richardson recorded a season-high 63 yards on four receptions against the Indianapolis Colts. The following week, he recorded his first touchdown as a Redskin, scoring on a 46-yard reception against the Packers. On October 14, in Week 6, Richardson caught three passes for 31 yards and a touchdown against the Carolina Panthers, his second touchdown of the season. On November 5, he was placed on injured reserve with a shoulder injury. In the 2018 season, he appeared in seven games and recorded 20 receptions for 262 receiving yards and two touchdowns.

In Week 3 of the 2019 season against the Chicago Bears, Richardson caught eight passes for 83 yards and a touchdown. He was placed on injured reserve on December 14, 2019, after struggling with a nagging hamstring injury for several weeks. He finished the 2019 season with 28 receptions for 245 receiving yards and two touchdowns in ten games.

On February 14, 2020, Richardson was released by the Redskins.

=== Seattle Seahawks (second stint) ===
Richardson re-signed with the Seahawks on August 29, 2020. On September 5, 2020, Richardson was released from the Seahawks.

== NFL career statistics ==
Year	Team	Games		Receiving					Rushing					Returning					Fumbles	
Year	Team	GP	GS	Rec	Yds	Avg	Lng	TD	Att	Yds	Avg	Lng	TD	Ret	Yds	Avg	Lng	TD	Fum	Lost
2014	SEA	15	6	29	271	9.3	32	1	0	0	0.0	0	0	16	376	23.5	47	0	1	0
2015	SEA	1	0	1	40	40.0	40	0	0	0	0.0	0	0	0	0	0.0	0	0	0	0
2016	SEA	15	0	21	288	13.7	39	1	1	5	5.0	5	0	5	105	21.0	32	0	0	0
2017	SEA	16	13	44	703	16.0	61	6	0	0	0.0	0	0	0	0	0.0	0	0	0	0
2018	WAS	7	4	20	262	13.1	46T	2	2	9	4.5	7	0	0	0	0.0	0	0	0	0
2019	WAS	10	6	28	245	8.8	22	2	1	0	0.0	0	0	0	0	0.0	0	0	0	0
Total		54	23	143	1,809	12.7	61	12	4	14	3.5	7	0	21	481	22.9	47	0	1	0
