= Dan Hawkins (gridiron football) =

American gridiron football player and coach (born 1960)

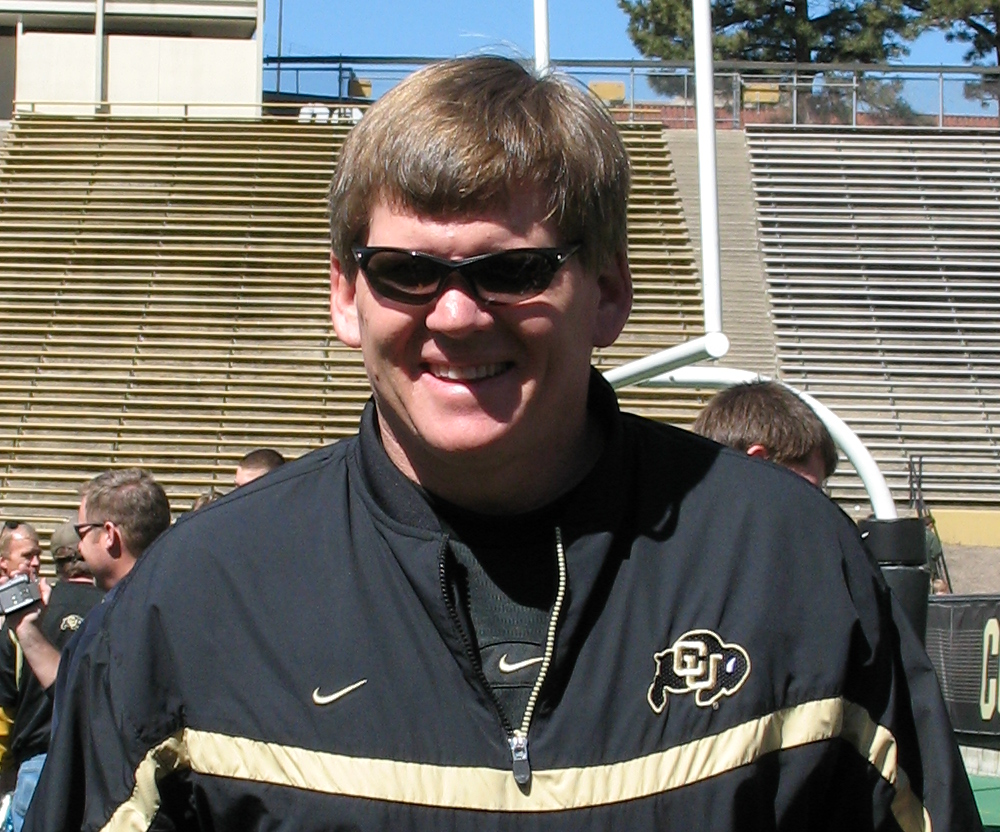
- Hawkins in 2007

Current position
- Title: Director of player and staff development
- Team: Idaho State
- Conference: Big Sky

Biographical details
- Born: November 10, 1960 (age 66); Fall River Mills, California, U.S.

Playing career
- 1978–1980: Siskiyous
- 1981–1982: UC Davis
- Position: Fullback

Coaching career (HC unless noted)
- 1983–1985: UC Davis (assistant)
- 1986–1987: Christian Bros. HS (CA)
- 1988–1991: Siskiyous (OC)
- 1992: Sonoma State (DC)
- 1993–1997: Willamette
- 1998–2000: Boise State (OC/TE/ST/RC)
- 2001–2005: Boise State
- 2006–2010: Colorado
- 2013: Montreal Alouettes
- 2015: United States national team
- 2015: Carlstad Crusaders (OC)
- 2016: Vienna Vikings (OC)
- 2017–2023: UC Davis

Administrative career (AD unless noted)
- 2024–present: Idaho State (director of player and staff development)

Head coaching record
- Overall: 156–92–1 (college)
- Bowls: 2–3
- Tournaments: 4–2 (NAIA playoffs); 1–2 (NCAA D-I playoffs)

Accomplishments and honors

Championships
- 2 NWC (1996–1997); 4 WAC (2002–2005); 1 Big Sky (2018); 1 CFA Mount Hood Division (1995)

Awards
- Eddie Robinson Award (2018); Big Sky Coach of the Year (2018); 2× WAC Coach of the Year
Medal record
Men's American football
Representing United States
World Championship
Gold medal – first place	2015 USA	Team competition

Danny Clarence Hawkins (born November 10, 1960) is an American football coach. He served as the head football coach at Willamette University from 1993 to 1997, Boise State University from 2001 to 2005, University of Colorado Boulder from 2006 to 2010, and the University of California, Davis from 2017 to 2023, compiling a career college football head coaching record of 156–92–1. Hawkins was the head coach of the Montreal Alouettes of the Canadian Football League (CFL) for five games in 2013 before he was fired mid-season. Between 2011 and 2016, he worked as a college football analyst for ESPN.

== Education and early positions ==
Danny Clarence Hawkins grew up in Bieber, California, in the northeast corner of the state. He attended junior college at College of the Siskiyous in Weed and transferred to UC Davis, where he played fullback, and earned a bachelor's degree in physical education in 1984. He later completed a master's degree in educational administration from St. Mary's College in 1993.

He began his coaching career at UC Davis under coach Jim Sochor the fall before he graduated, spending three years there (1983–1985). He then served as head coach at Christian Brothers High School in Sacramento for the 1986 and 1987 seasons. He spent four seasons (1988–1991) as the offensive coordinator at the College of the Siskiyous, then served as defensive coordinator at Sonoma State in 1992.

== Head coaching career ==
=== Willamette ===
In 1993, Hawkins became the head coach at Willamette University in Salem, Oregon, and led the Bearcats to a 40–11–1 overall record (.779) in five seasons. In his final season Willamette was 13–1, falling 14–7 in the 1997 NAIA Division II National Championship Game.

=== Boise State ===
Hawkins moved up to NCAA Division I-A football at Boise State in 1998 as an assistant under first-year head coach Dirk Koetter. After three seasons, Koetter accepted the head coaching job at Arizona State, and Hawkins was promoted from assistant head coach to head coach on December 2, 2000. In 2004, Hawkins was honored with his second Western Athletic Conference (WAC) Coach of the Year title in three years. Through the 2005 season, he compiled a 53–11 record (.828) in five seasons as Boise State's head coach, including a 37–3 record (.925) in WAC competition with four straight WAC titles. Only Walter Camp, George Washington Woodruff and Bob Pruett had more total wins in their first five years of head coaching. He holds a 31–game WAC winning streak, the longest in conference history. One of his first hires at Boise State was Chris Petersen as his offensive coordinator; Petersen was a quarterback at UC Davis while Hawkins was an assistant coach, and was the wide receivers coach at Oregon under head coach Mike Bellotti. Petersen succeeded Hawkins as head coach following the 2005 season, when Hawkins departed for Colorado.

=== Colorado ===
Hawkins was introduced as head football coach at the University of Colorado on December 16, 2005. Hawkins was signed to a five-year contract paying him $900,000 annually with incentives totaling to $1.5 million. Hawkins took over the Colorado football program from Gary Barnett, who had spent some of his tenure mired in controversy.

Hawkins earned national attention in February 2007 during the National Signing Day press conference. He passionately expressed his disappointment in the attitude of a player's parent who had anonymously complained about the reduction in the players' time off before the summer conditioning program started, famously saying "It's Division I football! It's the Big 12! It ain't intramurals! You've got two weeks after finals. You've got a week at July 4th. You've got a week before camp starts. That's a month! That's probably more vacation than you guys (reporters) get. And we're a little bummed out that we don't get three weeks? Go play intramurals, brother. Go play intramurals."

Prior to the 2009 season, Hawkins, under fire for his performance at Colorado thus far, publicly pledged "ten wins no excuses". The team ended that year with a 3–9 record. On November 26, 2009, Colorado athletic director Mike Bohn announced that Hawkins would return as head football coach for the 2010 season, despite an overall record at Colorado of 16–33.

On November 6, 2010, Colorado blew a 28-point fourth quarter lead over the Kansas Jayhawks and lost, 52–45, the biggest collapse in the 121-year history of Colorado football. While still nursing that large lead in the fourth quarter, Hawkins continued to have his team throw the ball on offense instead of running it, allowing Kansas time to mount its comeback. There has been widespread suspicion Hawkins made that choice because he was more concerned about his quarterback, son Cody Hawkins, breaking the school's all-time passing record than winning the game.

After the Kansas loss, Hawkins was criticized for cutting his contractually-obligated post-game interview with radio station KOA short after just two questions and 27 seconds. After the interviewer asked him why Colorado didn't run the ball more to protect their shrinking lead, he dismissively replied, "We were playing football moving it both ways. A tough day. Thanks, guys."

As it turned out, it would be the last game Hawkins would coach at Colorado. He was fired on November 9, 2010. He was making approximately $1.5 million a year including incentives and base salary; his buyout was approximately $2 million. Longtime assistant Brian Cabral finished out the season.

=== Broadcasting ===
Between 2011 and 2016, Hawkins served as a college football analyst for ESPN.

=== Montreal Alouettes ===
On February 19, 2013, Hawkins was named the new head coach of the Montreal Alouettes of the Canadian Football League. On June 27, 2013, Hawkins won his first game as Alouettes head coach, defeating the Winnipeg Blue Bombers in Winnipeg. On August 1, 2013, he was fired by the team after starting the season 2–3. The CFL's all-time leading passer Anthony Calvillo and the Alouettes had been struggling on offense. Hawkins was replaced by the general manager Jim Popp.

=== US national team and Europe ===
Hawkins coached the 2015 United States national American football team at the 2015 IFAF World Championship to a gold medal. In 2015, Hawkins served as offensive coordinator for Carlstad Crusaders in the Swedish Superserien winning the national title and European Champions League. In 2016 Hawkins served as offensive coordinator for Vikings Vienna in the Austrian Football League.

=== UC Davis ===
On November 18, 2016, Hawkins accepted an offer to become head coach of the UC Davis Aggies. He had been slated to serve as offensive coordinator at Florida International under Butch Davis when he was offered the position with the Aggies. On November 28, 2023, he announced he was stepping down to "pursue other interests and also to spend more time with [his] family."

== Personal life ==
Hawkins is married to Misti Rae Ann Hokanson, a registered nurse. They are the parents of four grown children, daughters Ashley and Brittany, and sons Cody and Drew, former Boise state quarterback.

== Head coaching record ==
=== College ===
Year	Team	Overall	Conference	Standing	Bowl/playoffs	Coaches^{#}	AP^{°}
Willamette Bearcats (Columbia Football Association) (1993–1995)
1993	Willamette	5–4	3–2	T–2nd (Mount Hood)			
1994	Willamette	7–2	4–1	2nd (Mount Hood)			
1995	Willamette	6–2–1	4–0–1	T–1st (Mount Hood)			
Willamette Bearcats (Northwest Conference) (1996–1997)
1996	Willamette	9–2	5–0	1st	L NAIA Division II Quarterfinal		
1997	Willamette	13–1	5–0	1st	L NAIA Division Championship		
Willamette:		40–11–1	21–3–1				
Boise State Broncos (Western Athletic Conference) (2001–2005)
2001	Boise State	8–4	6–2	2nd			
2002	Boise State	12–1	8–0	1st	W Humanitarian	12	15
2003	Boise State	13–1	8–0	1st	W Fort Worth	15	16
2004	Boise State	11–1	8–0	1st	L Liberty	13	12
2005	Boise State	9–4	7–1	T–1st	L MPC Computers		
Boise State:		53–11	37–3				
Colorado Buffaloes (Big 12 Conference) (2006–2010)
2006	Colorado	2–10	2–6	5th (North)			
2007	Colorado	6–7	4–4	3rd (North)	L Independence		
2008	Colorado	5–7	2–6	T–4th (North)			
2009	Colorado	3–9	2–6	5th (North)			
2010	Colorado	3–6 (Note: Hawkins was fired after nine games. Brian Cabral coached the final three games of the season.)	0–5	5th (North)			
Colorado:		19–39	10–27				
UC Davis Aggies (Big Sky Conference) (2017–2023)
2017	UC Davis	5–6	3–5	8th			
2018	UC Davis	10–3	7–1	T–1st	L NCAA Division I Quarterfinal	8	7
2019	UC Davis	5–7	3–5	T–6th			
2020–21	UC Davis	3–2	3–2	T–3rd		12	13
2021	UC Davis	8–4	5–3	T–5th	L NCAA Division I First Round	16	17
2022	UC Davis	6–5	5–3	5th			25
2023	UC Davis	7–4	5–3	5th			24
UC Davis:		44–31	31–22				
Total:		156–92–1					
National championship Conference title Conference division title or championship game berth
^{#}Rankings from final Coaches Poll.; ^{°}Rankings from final AP Poll.

=== CFL ===
Team	Year	Regular season					Post season		
Team	Year	Won	Lost	Ties	Win %	Finish	Won	Lost	Result
MTL	2013	2	3	0	0.400	fired mid-season	–	–	fired mid-season
Total		2	3	0	0.400		0	0	
