= 2013 Colorado Buffaloes football team =

American college football season

2013 Colorado Buffaloes football
- Conference: Pac-12 Conference
- South Division
- Record: 4–8 (1–8 Pac-12)
- Head coach: Mike MacIntyre (1st season)
- Offensive coordinator: Brian Lindgren (1st season)
- Offensive scheme: Pro-style
- Defensive coordinator: Kent Baer (1st season)
- Base defense: 4–3
- Home stadium: Folsom Field

2013 Pac-12 Conference football standings
	Conf.			Overall
Team	W		L	W		L
North Division
No. 11 Stanford xy$	7	–	2	11	–	3
No. 9 Oregon x	7	–	2	11	–	2
No. 25 Washington	5	–	4	9	–	4
Oregon State	4	–	5	7	–	6
Washington State	4	–	5	6	–	7
California	0	–	9	1	–	11
South Division
No. 21 Arizona State xy	8	–	1	10	–	4
No. 16 UCLA	6	–	3	10	–	3
No. 19 USC	6	–	3	10	–	4
Arizona	4	–	5	8	–	5
Utah	2	–	7	5	–	7
Colorado	1	–	8	4	–	8
Championship: Stanford 38, Arizona State 14
$ – BCS representative as conference champion; x – Division champion/co-champions; y – Championship game participant; Rankings from AP Poll

The 2013 Colorado Buffaloes football team represented the University of Colorado at Boulder during the 2013 NCAA Division I FBS football season. Led by first-year head coach Mike MacIntyre, the Buffaloes played their home games on-campus at Folsom Field in Boulder and were members of the Pac-12 Conference. Head coach Mike MacIntyre was hired after the firing of Jon Embree concluding the 2012 season.

== Recruiting ==
National Signing Day was on February 6, 2013, and Colorado signed high school athletes from around the country.

College recruiting information
Name	Hometown	School	Height	Weight	Commit date
Michael Adkins II; RB	San Diego, CA	Helix High School	5 ft 10 in (1.78 m)	190 lb (86 kg)	Jan 31, 2013
Michael Adkins II; RB	Recruit ratings: Scout: Rivals: (NR)				
Chidobe Awuzie; DB	San Jose, CA	Oak Grove High School	6 ft 0 in (1.83 m)	190 lb (86 kg)	Feb 6, 2013
Chidobe Awuzie; DB	Recruit ratings: Scout: Rivals: ESPN: (74)				
Bryce Bobo; WR	Covina, CA	Charter Oak High School	6 ft 3 in (1.91 m)	190 lb (86 kg)	Jun 15, 2012
Bryce Bobo; WR	Recruit ratings: Scout: Rivals: ESPN: (76)				
Timothy Coleman Jr. DL	Denver, CO	Mullen High School	6 ft 3 in (1.91 m)	245 lb (111 kg)	Dec 9, 2012
Timothy Coleman Jr. DL	Recruit ratings: Scout: Rivals: ESPN: (70)				
Elijah Dunston; WR	Reseda, CA	Chaminade Prep High School	6 ft 0 in (1.83 m)	180 lb (82 kg)	Jun 15, 2012
Elijah Dunston; WR	Recruit ratings: Scout: Rivals: ESPN: (74)				
George Frazier; LB	Monrovia, CA	Monrovia High School	6 ft 2 in (1.88 m)	255 lb (116 kg)	Jun 19, 2012
George Frazier; LB	Recruit ratings: Scout: Rivals: ESPN: (72)				
Jimmie Gilbert; DL	College Station, TX	A&M Consolidated High School	6 ft 5 in (1.96 m)	230 lb (100 kg)	Nov 12, 2012
Jimmie Gilbert; DL	Recruit ratings: Scout: Rivals: ESPN: (76)				
Addison Gillam; LB	Palo Cedro, CA	Foothill High School	6 ft 3 in (1.91 m)	225 lb (102 kg)	Jan 7, 2013
Addison Gillam; LB	Recruit ratings: Scout: Rivals: (NR)				
Gunnar Graham; OL	Belvedere, CA	Marin Catholic High School	6 ft 5 in (1.96 m)	305 lb (138 kg)	Jun 30, 2012
Gunnar Graham; OL	Recruit ratings: Scout: Rivals: ESPN: (76)				
Jonathan Huckins; OL	The Woodlands, TX	The Woodlands High School	6 ft 3 in (1.91 m)	310 lb (140 kg)	Jun 11, 2012
Jonathan Huckins; OL	Recruit ratings: Scout: Rivals: ESPN: (77)				
Sam Kronshage; OL	The Woodlands, TX	The Woodlands High School	6 ft 5 in (1.96 m)	275 lb (125 kg)	Jun 11, 2012
Sam Kronshage; OL	Recruit ratings: Scout: Rivals: ESPN: (74)				
Phillip Lindsay; RB/DB	Aurora, CO	Denver South High School	5 ft 7 in (1.70 m)	170 lb (77 kg)	Mar 23, 2012
Phillip Lindsay; RB/DB	Recruit ratings: Scout: Rivals: ESPN: (75)				
John Lisella II; OL	Littleton, CO	Columbine High School	6 ft 4 in (1.93 m)	215 lb (98 kg)	Jun 16, 2012
John Lisella II; OL	Recruit ratings: Scout: Rivals: ESPN: (70)				
Sefo Liufau; QB	Tacoma, WA	Bellarmine Preparatory School	6 ft 4 in (1.93 m)	215 lb (98 kg)	Apr 15, 2012
Sefo Liufau; QB	Recruit ratings: Scout: Rivals: ESPN: (80)				
Kenneth Olugbode; LB	San Jose, CA	Bellarmine College Preparatory	6 ft 1 in (1.85 m)	205 lb (93 kg)	Jan 28, 2013
Kenneth Olugbode; LB	Recruit ratings: Scout: Rivals: (NR)				
Markeis Reed; LB	Napa, CA	Vintage High School	6 ft 4 in (1.93 m)	220 lb (100 kg)	Jan 5, 2013
Markeis Reed; LB	Recruit ratings: Scout: Rivals: ESPN: (73)				
Devin Ross; WR	Altadena, CA	Bishop Alemany High School	5 ft 10 in (1.78 m)	180 lb (82 kg)	Aug 4, 2012
Devin Ross; WR	Recruit ratings: Scout: Rivals: ESPN: (77)				
Ryan Severson; ILB	San Jose, CA	Valley Christian High School	5 ft 11 in (1.80 m)	195 lb (88 kg)	Jan 18, 2013
Ryan Severson; ILB	Recruit ratings: Scout: Rivals: ESPN: (70)				
Colin Sutton; OL	Foothill Ranch, CA	Orange Lutheran High School	6 ft 5 in (1.96 m)	295 lb (134 kg)	May 2, 2012
Colin Sutton; OL	Recruit ratings: Scout: Rivals: ESPN: (72)				
Tedric Thompson; DB	Valencia, CA	Valencia High School	6 ft 1 in (1.85 m)	200 lb (91 kg)	Feb 6, 2013
Tedric Thompson; DB	Recruit ratings: Scout: Rivals: ESPN: (75)				
Gerrad Kough; OL	Pomona, CA	Pomona High School	6 ft 5 in (1.96 m)	295 lb (134 kg)	Jul 5, 2011
Gerrad Kough; OL	Recruit ratings: Scout: Rivals: ESPN: (73)				
Derek McCartney; DL	Westminster, CO	Faith Christian High School	6 ft 4 in (1.93 m)	240 lb (110 kg)	Jan 22, 2012
Derek McCartney; DL	Recruit ratings: Scout: Rivals: (NR)				
Jeff Thomas; WR	Dallas, TX	Duncanville High School	6 ft 3 in (1.91 m)	195 lb (88 kg)	Jun 18, 2011
Jeff Thomas; WR	Recruit ratings: Scout: Rivals: ESPN: (74)				
Overall recruit ranking: Scout: 61
Note: In many cases, Scout, Rivals, 247Sports, On3, and ESPN may conflict in their listings of height and weight.; In these cases, the average was taken. ESPN grades are on a 100-point scale.; Sources: "2013 Colorado Recruits". Scout.; "Scout.com Team Recruiting Rankings". Scout.; "2013 Team Ranking". Rivals.com.

== Schedule ==
Date	Time	Opponent	Site	TV	Result	Attendance
September 1	4:00 p.m.	vs. Colorado State*	Sports Authority Field at Mile High; Denver, CO (Rocky Mountain Showdown)	CBSSN	W 41–27	59,601
September 7	6:00 p.m.	No. 7 (FCS) Central Arkansas*	Folsom Field; Boulder, CO	P12N	W 38–24	35,168
September 14	12:00 p.m.	Fresno State*	Folsom Field; Boulder, CO	P12N	Canceled ^{A}	
September 28	1:00 p.m.	at Oregon State	Reser Stadium; Corvallis, OR	P12N	L 17–44	44,279
October 5	4:00 p.m.	No. 2 Oregon	Folsom Field; Boulder, CO	P12N	L 16–57	45,944
October 12	8:00 p.m.	at Arizona State	Sun Devil Stadium; Tempe, AZ	P12N	L 13–54	50,104
October 19	12:00 p.m.	Charleston Southern*	Folsom Field; Boulder, CO	P12N	W 43–10	36,730
October 26	6:00 p.m.	Arizona^{†}	Folsom Field; Boulder, CO	P12N	L 20–44	38,679
November 2	4:30 p.m.	at No. 17 UCLA	Rose Bowl; Pasadena, CA	FS1	L 23–45	80,377
November 9	6:00 p.m.	at Washington	Husky Stadium; Seattle, WA	P12N	L 7–59	66,599
November 16	3:30 p.m.	California	Folsom Field; Boulder, CO	P12N	W 41–24	38,252
November 23	7:30 p.m.	No. 23 USC	Folsom Field; Boulder, CO	P12N	L 29–47	36,005
November 30	12:00 p.m.	at Utah	Rice–Eccles Stadium; Salt Lake City, UT (Rumble in the Rockies)	P12N	L 17–24	45,023
*Non-conference game; ^{†}Homecoming; Rankings from AP Poll released prior to the game; All times are in Mountain time

- ^A The non-conference home game against Fresno State on September 15 was canceled due to effects from the Boulder Creek flash floods. On September 30, Charleston Southern was added as a replacement opponent to be played on October 19.

== Game summaries ==
=== Colorado State ===
	1	2	3	4	Total
Rams	0	10	14	3	27
Buffaloes	10	10	3	18	41

=== Central Arkansas ===
	1	2	3	4	Total
Bears	0	14	3	7	24
Buffaloes	7	7	3	21	38

=== Oregon State ===
	1	2	3	4	Total
Buffaloes	3	0	0	14	17
Beavers	10	7	21	6	44

=== Oregon ===
	1	2	3	4	Total
#2 Ducks	29	14	14	0	57
Buffaloes	10	6	0	0	16

=== Arizona State ===
	1	2	3	4	Total
Buffaloes	0	6	0	7	13
Sun Devils	25	22	7	0	54

=== Charleston Southern ===
	1	2	3	4	Total
Buccaneers	0	10	0	0	10
Buffaloes	8	14	7	14	43

Colorado's game vs Fresno State on September 14 was canceled due to flooding, making Colorado need to add a 12th game. On September 30, Charleston Southern was granted a waiver to play a 13th regular season game to be able to play Colorado.

=== Arizona ===
	1	2	3	4	Total
Wildcats	10	14	10	10	44
Buffaloes	7	6	7	0	20

=== At No. 17 UCLA ===
	1	2	3	4	Total
Buffaloes	3	10	0	10	23
No. 17 Bruins	7	14	14	10	45

=== Washington ===
	1	2	3	4	Total
Buffaloes	7	0	0	0	7
Huskies	10	21	21	7	59

=== California ===
	1	2	3	4	Total
Golden Bears	0	10	0	14	24
Buffaloes	3	21	3	14	41

=== USC ===
	1	2	3	4	Total
#23 Trojans	9	14	14	10	47
Buffaloes	0	0	7	22	29

== Awards and honors ==
- September 2: Paul Richardson, WR, was named Pac-12 Conference offensive player of the week
