= Steven Montez =

American football player (born 1997)

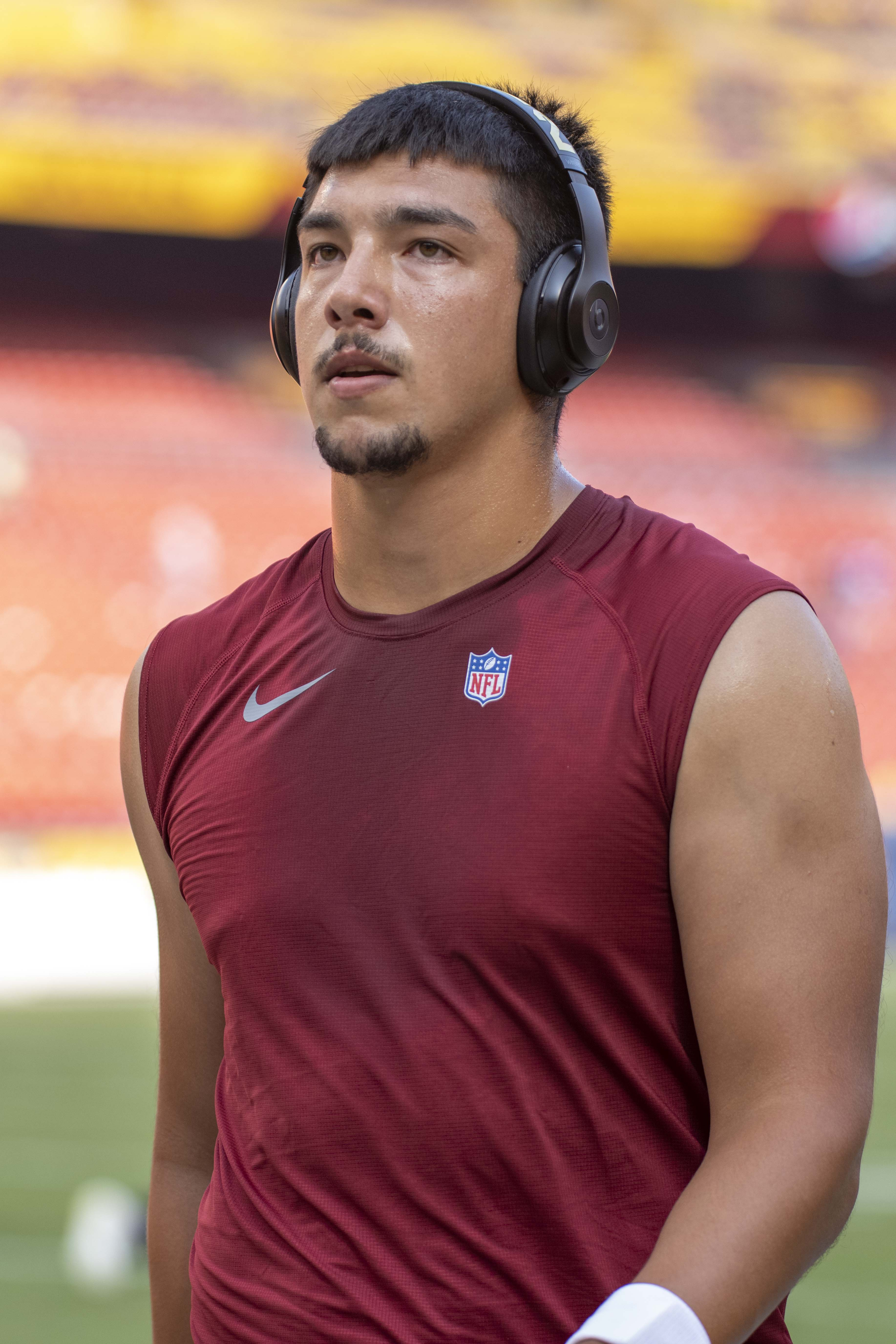
- Montez with the Washington Football Team in 2021

No. 6, 12
- Position: Quarterback

Personal information
- Born: January 14, 1997 (age 29); Oakland, California, U.S.
- Listed height: 6 ft 5 in (1.96 m)
- Listed weight: 235 lb (107 kg)

Career information
- High school: Del Valle (El Paso, Texas)
- College: Colorado (2015–2019)
- NFL draft: 2020: undrafted

Career history
- Washington Football Team (2020); Detroit Lions (2021–2022)*; Seattle Sea Dragons (2023); Edmonton Elks (2024)*
- * Offseason or practice squad member only
- Stats at Pro Football Reference

Steven Montez (born January 14, 1997) is an American former professional football player who played quarterback in the National Football League (NFL). He played college football for the Colorado Buffaloes and signed with the Washington Football Team as an undrafted free agent in 2020.

== Early life ==
Montez attended Del Valle High School in El Paso, Texas. During his career, he passed for 6,512 passing yards with 86 touchdowns, and 8,149 yards of total offense. He committed to the University of Colorado Boulder to play college football. A three-star recruit, Montez chose Colorado over offers from Air Force, New Mexico State, and UTEP.

== College career ==
After redshirting his first year at Colorado in 2015, Montez played in 10 games and made three starts as a redshirt freshman in 2016. He spent most of the season as the backup to Sefo Liufau, but started three games due to Liufau injuries. Overall he completed 83 of 140 passes for 1,078 yards, nine touchdowns and five interceptions. Montez entered 2017 as the starting quarterback. In 12 starts, he completed 228 of 377 passes for 2,975 yards, 18 touchdowns and nine interceptions. Montez returned as the starter in 2018. He returned again for his senior season in 2019.

== Professional career ==
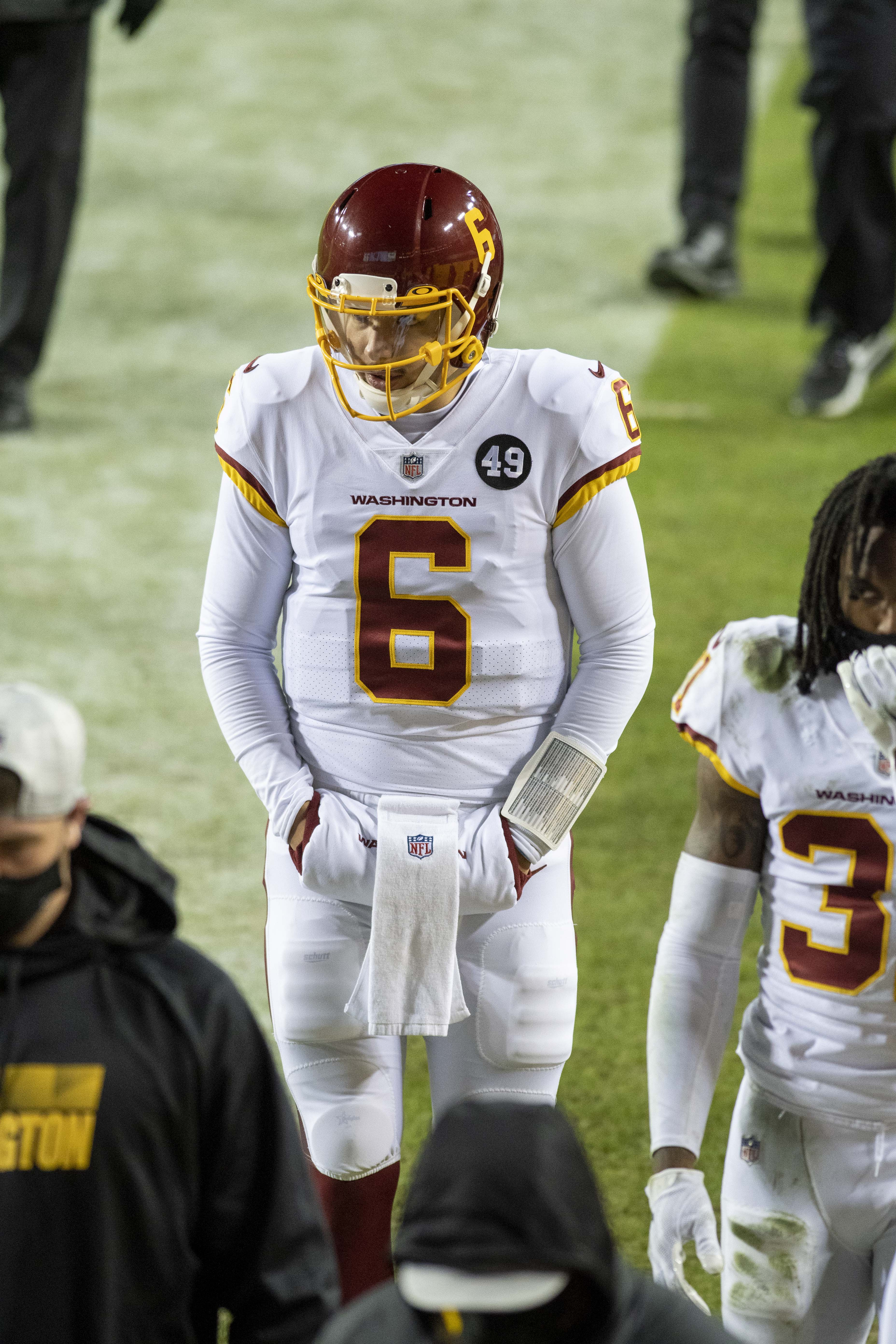
Montez with the Washington Football Team in 2020

Pre-draft measurables
Height	Weight	Arm length	Hand span	Wingspan	40-yard dash	10-yard split	20-yard split	20-yard shuttle	Three-cone drill	Vertical jump	Broad jump
6 ft 4 in (1.93 m)	231 lb (105 kg)	32 3/4 in (0.83 m)	9 3/8 in (0.24 m)	6 ft 4 7/8 in (1.95 m)	4.68 s	1.59 s	2.75 s	4.43 s	7.25 s	33.0 in (0.84 m)	9 ft 9 in (2.97 m)
All values from NFL Combine

=== Washington Football Team ===
Montez signed with the Washington Football Team as an undrafted free agent following the 2020 NFL draft. He was waived on September 5, 2020 and signed to the practice squad the next day. Montez was elevated to the active roster on December 18 and December 26 for the team's weeks 15 and 16 games against the Seattle Seahawks and Carolina Panthers, and reverted to the practice squad after each game. He was signed to the active roster prior to the Week 17 game against the Philadelphia Eagles.

Montez was waived by Washington on August 31, 2021.

=== Detroit Lions ===
On September 2, 2021, Montez was signed to the Detroit Lions' practice squad. He signed a reserve/future contract with the Lions on January 10, 2022, but was waived on May 11, 2022. He re-signed to the Lions' practice squad on December 22.

=== Seattle Sea Dragons ===
Montez was allocated to the Seattle Sea Dragons of the XFL on November 15, 2022, but re-signed to the Lions' practice squad on December 22. He re-joined the Sea Dragons after his practice squad contract with the Lions expired. The Sea Dragons folded when the XFL and USFL merged to create the United Football League (UFL).

=== Edmonton Elks ===
Montez signed with the Edmonton Elks on January 18, 2024. He was placed on the retired list on May 3.

== Personal life ==
Montez's father, Alfred, played in the NFL with the Oakland Raiders in 1996 and was his quarterback coach at Del Valle. During his time at Colorado, Montez was a member of the Sigma Pi fraternity.

== Professional statistics ==
=== Regular season ===
Year	League	Team	Games			Passing								Rushing			
Year	League	Team	GP	GS	Record	Cmp	Att	Pct	Yds	Avg	TD	Int	Rtg	Att	Yds	Avg	TD
2023	XFL	SEA	1	0	0-0	1	2	50.0	6	3.0	0	0	56.3	0	0	0.0	0
