= Jeff Geiser =

American football coach (born 1953)

Biographical details
- Born: February 25, 1953

Playing career
- 1972–1974: Colorado
- Position: Linebacker

Coaching career (HC unless noted)
- 1984–1996: Adams State

Administrative career (AD unless noted)
- ?: Adams State
- 2009–2016: Eastern New Mexico

Head coaching record
- Overall: 65–68–2
- Tournaments: 3–2 (NAIA D-I playoffs)

Accomplishments and honors

Championships
- 1 RMAC (1989)

Awards
- NAIA Division I Coach of the Year (1989)

Jeff Geiser (born February 25, 1953) is an American former football coach and college athletics administrator. He served as the head football coach at Adams State College—now known as Adams State University—in Alamosa, Colorado for 13 seasons, from 1984 to 1996, compiling a record of 65–68–2. Geiser played college football as a linebacker at the University of Colorado Boulder from 1972 to 1974. He coached at Grand Junction High School in Grand Junction, Colorado and Mesa State College—now known as Colorado Mesa University—before being hired as head football coach at Adams State.

A native of La Veta, Colorado, Geiser worked as a sporting goods salesman before returning to college sports as the athletic director at Eastern New Mexico University in 2009.

== Head coaching record ==
Year	Team	Overall	Conference	Standing	Bowl/playoffs
Adams State Indians/Grizzlies (Rocky Mountain Athletic Conference) (1984–1996)
1984	Adams State	6–3	6–2	2nd	
1985	Adams State	4–5	4–3	T–3rd	
1986	Adams State	2–8	2–4	5th	
1987	Adams State	5–6	4–2	2nd	
1988	Adams State	10–3–1	3–1–1	2nd	L NAIA Championship
1989	Adams State	9–2	7–0	1st	L NAIA First Round
1990	Adams State	5–4	3–1	2nd	
1991	Adams State	6–4	2–4	6th	
1992	Adams State	3–7	1–6	7th	
1993	Adams State	4–6	3–4	5th	
1994	Adams State	3–7–1	2–4–1	T–5th	
1995	Adams State	4–6	3–4	T–4th	
1996	Adams State	4–7	2–6	T–7th	
Adams State:		65–68–2	42–41–2		
Total:		65–68–2			
National championship Conference title Conference division title or championship game berth
