= 2010 Colorado Buffaloes football team =

American college football season

2010 Colorado Buffaloes football
- Conference: Big 12 Conference
- North
- Record: 5–7 (2–6 Big 12)
- Head coach: Dan Hawkins (5th season; first 9 games); Brian Cabral (interim; final 3 games)
- Offensive coordinator: Eric Kiesau (2nd season)
- Offensive scheme: Multiple
- Defensive coordinator: Ron Collins (5th season)
- Base defense: 4–3
- Home stadium: Folsom Field

Uniform

2010 Big 12 Conference football standings
	Conf.			Overall
Team	W		L	W		L
North Division
No. 20 Nebraska xy	6	–	2	10	–	4
No. 18 Missouri x	6	–	2	10	–	3
Kansas State	3	–	5	7	–	6
Iowa State	3	–	5	5	–	7
Colorado	2	–	6	5	–	7
Kansas	1	–	7	3	–	9
South Division
No. 6 Oklahoma xy$	6	–	2	12	–	2
No. 13 Oklahoma State x	6	–	2	11	–	2
No. 19 Texas A&M x	6	–	2	9	–	4
Baylor	4	–	4	7	–	6
Texas Tech	3	–	5	8	–	5
Texas	2	–	6	5	–	7
Championship: Oklahoma 23, Nebraska 20
$ – BCS representative as conference champion; x – Division champion/co-champions; y – Championship game participant; Rankings from AP Poll

The 2010 Colorado Buffaloes football team represented the University of Colorado in the 2010 NCAA Division I FBS football season. The team was coached by fifth-year head coach Dan Hawkins for the first nine games and interim head coach Brian Cabral for the final three games. Colorado played their homes game at Folsom Field. It was also the final season as members the Big 12 Conference in the North Division for Colorado, before joining the Pac-12 Conference for the 2011 season, the Buffaloes would return to the Big 12 in 2024. The Buffaloes failed to qualify for a bowl game, as they finished the season 5–7, 2–6 in Big 12 play, which included a historical collapse in their game against Kansas, allowing 35 unanswered points in the fourth quarter to lose the game 52–45.

Hawkins was fired on November 9 by Colorado athletic director Mike Bohn. Three days prior to the dismissal, Hawkins' 3–5 (0–4) Buffaloes suffered a fourth-quarter meltdown that saw the 2–6 Kansas Jayhawks overcome a 28-point deficit and outscore Colorado 35–0 in the final 11:05 of the game. It was the biggest collapse in Colorado football history. Hawkins had never secured a winning season during his tenure at Colorado, finishing with a record of 19–39 and in the midst of a 17-game road losing streak. Bohn promoted Associate head coach Brian Cabral to fill in as interim Head Coach for the remainder of the 2010 season, as the University prepared for a national search to replace Hawkins.

== Schedule ==
Date	Time	Opponent	Site	TV	Result	Attendance
September 4	12:00 p.m.	vs. Colorado State*	Invesco Field at Mile High; Denver, CO (Rocky Mountain Showdown)	The Mtn.	W 24–3	60,989
September 11	12:30 p.m.	at California*	California Memorial Stadium; Berkeley, CA	FSN	L 7–52	55,440
September 18	1:30 p.m.	Hawai'i*	Folsom Field; Boulder, CO		W 31–13	47,840
October 2	5:00 p.m.	Georgia*	Folsom Field; Boulder, CO	FSN	W 29–27	52,855
October 9	5:00 p.m.	at No. 22 Missouri	Faurot Field; Columbia, MO	FSN	L 0–26	62,965
October 16	5:00 p.m.	Baylor	Folsom Field; Boulder, CO	FCS Central	L 25–31	48,953
October 23	1:30 p.m.	Texas Tech^{†}	Folsom Field; Boulder, CO		L 24–27	47,655
October 30	7:15 p.m.	at No. 11 Oklahoma	Gaylord Family Oklahoma Memorial Stadium; Norman, OK	ESPN2	L 10–43	84,173
November 6	12:00 p.m.	at Kansas	Memorial Stadium; Lawrence, KS		L 45–52	40,851
November 13	11:30 a.m.	Iowa State	Folsom Field; Boulder, CO	FCS Central	W 34–14	42,722
November 20	11:10 a.m.	Kansas State	Folsom Field; Boulder, CO (rivalry)	PPV	W 44–36	41,147
November 26	1:30 p.m.	at No. 15 Nebraska	Memorial Stadium; Lincoln, NE	ABC	L 17–45	85,646
*Non-conference game; ^{†}Homecoming; Rankings from Coaches' Poll released prior to the game; All times are in Mountain time

== Game summaries ==
=== Georgia ===
Georgia Bulldogs at Colorado Buffaloes – Game summary

Quarter	1	2	3	4	Total
Bulldogs	3	14	7	3	27
Buffaloes	7	7	15	0	29

at Folsom Field, Boulder, Colorado

- Date: October 2
- Game time: 5:00 p.m. MDT
- Game attendance: 52,855
- TV: FSN
- Recap

Game information
First quarter
- COLO – Matthew Bahr 4-yard pass from Tyler Hansen (Aric Goodman kick), 7:47. Buffaloes 7–0. Drive: 13 plays, 80 yards, 7:13.
- UGA – Blair Walsh 33-yard field goal, 4:58. Buffaloes 7–3. Drive: 7 plays, 9 yards, 2:37.

Second quarter

- COLO – Brian Lockridge 1-yard run (Aric Goodman kick), 13:15. Buffaloes 14–3. Drive: 8 plays, 78 yards, 3:15.
- UGA – A. J. Green 3-yard pass from Aaron Murray (Blair Walsh kick), 11:08. Buffaloes 14–10. Drive: 5 plays, 80 yards, 2:07.
- UGA – A. J. Green 39-yard pass from Aaron Murray (Blair Walsh kick), 7:53. Bulldogs 17–14. Drive: 1 play, 39 yards, 0:07.

Third quarter

- UGA – Marlon Brown 8-yard pass from Aaron Murray (Blair Walsh kick), 10:40. Bulldogs 24–14. Drive: 9 plays, 85 yards, 4:15.
- COLO – Tyler Hansen 2-yard run (Cody Hawkins pass to Ryan Deehan), 7:46. Bulldogs 24–22. Drive: 5 plays, 81 yards, 2:47.
- COLO – Rodney Stewart 11-yard run (Aric Goodman kick), 4:39. Buffaloes 29–24. Drive: 5 plays, 67 yards, 0:55.

Fourth quarter

- UGA – Blair Walsh 20-yard field goal, 12:30. Buffaloes 29–27. Drive: 10 plays, 80 yards, 3:32.

Statistics	UGA	COLO
First downs	20	18
Total yards	409	393
Rushing yards	188	235
Passing yards	221	158
Turnovers	2	1
Time of possession	26:00	34:00

Team	Category	Player	Statistics
Georgia	Passing	Aaron Murray	16/27, 221 yards, 3 TD, INT
Georgia	Rushing	Caleb King	12 rushes, 100 yards
Georgia	Receiving	A. J. Green	7 receptions, 119 yards, 2 TD
Colorado	Passing	Tyler Hansen	13/20, 158 yards, TD, INT
Colorado	Rushing	Rodney Stewart	19 rushes, 149 yards, TD
Colorado	Receiving	Will Jefferson Jr.	1 reception, 46 yards

Colorado honored the 1990 national championship team during the week.

=== At Kansas ===
Colorado Buffaloes at Kansas Jayhawks – Game summary

Quarter	1	2	3	4	Total
Buffaloes	14	21	3	7	45
Jayhawks	3	7	7	35	52

at Memorial Stadium, Lawrence, Kansas

- Date: November 6
- Game time: 12:00 p.m. MST / 1:00 p.m. CST
- Game attendance: 40,851

Game information
First quarter
- COLO – Rodney Stewart 7-yard run (Aric Goodman kick), 9:22. Buffaloes 7–0. Drive: 12 plays, 80 yards, 5:38.
- KU – Jacob Branstetter 23-yard field goal, 4:02. Buffaloes 7–3. Drive: 13 plays, 56 yards, 5:15.
- COLO – Paul Richardson 62-yard pass from Cody Hawkins (Aric Goodman kick), 1:25. Buffaloes 14–3. Drive: 6 plays, 80 yards, 2:37.

Second quarter

- COLO – Paul Richardson 4-yard pass from Cody Hawkins (Aric Goodman kick), 9:35. Buffaloes 21–3. Drive: 11 plays, 71 yards, 5:18.
- COLO – Rodney Stewart 1-yard run (Aric Goodman kick), 2:05. Buffaloes 28–3. Drive: 6 plays, 51 yards, 2:53.
- KU – D. J. Beshears 19-yard pass from Quinn Mecham (Jacob Branstetter kick), 0:49. Buffaloes 28–10. Drive: 8 plays, 82 yards, 1:10.
- COLO – DeVaughn Thornton 12-yard pass from Cody Hawkins (Aric Goodman kick), 0:03. Buffaloes 35–10. Drive: 5 plays, 62 yards, 0:41.

Third quarter

- COLO – Aric Goodman 38-yard field goal, 9:57. Buffaloes 38–10. Drive: 7 plays, 28 yards, 2:15.
- KU – James Sims 1-yard run (Jacob Branstetter kick), 3:16. Buffaloes 38–17. Drive: 14 plays, 69 yards, 6:35.

Fourth quarter

- COLO – Rodney Stewart 8-yard run (Aric Goodman kick), 14:52. Buffaloes 45–17. Drive: 7 plays, 73 yards, 3:18.
- KU – James Sims 13-yard run (Jacob Branstetter kick), 11:05. Buffaloes 45–24. Drive: 9 plays, 66 yards, 3:42.
- KU – Johnathan Wilson 38-yard pass from Quinn Mecham (Jacob Branstetter kick), 9:26. Buffaloes 45–31. Drive: 4 plays, 59 yards, 1:39.
- KU – Tyler Patmon 28-yard fumble return (Jacob Branstetter kick), 7:12. Buffaloes 45–38.
- KU – James Sims 6-yard run (Jacob Branstetter kick), 4:30. Tied 45–45. Drive: 5 plays, 37 yards, 1:59.
- KU – James Sims 28-yard run (Jacob Branstetter kick), 0:52. Jayhawks 52–45. Drive: 5 plays, 63 yards, 1:57.

Statistics	COLO	KU
First downs	31	27
Total yards	464	453
Rushing yards	142	201
Passing yards	322	252
Turnovers	3	2
Time of possession	30:09	29:51

Team	Category	Player	Statistics
Colorado	Passing	Cody Hawkins	29/44, 322 yards, 3 TD, 2 INT
Colorado	Rushing	Rodney Stewart	27 rushes, 175 yards, 3 TD
Colorado	Receiving	Paul Richardson	11 receptions, 141 yards, 2 TD
Kansas	Passing	Quinn Mecham	23/28, 252 yards, 2 TD, 2 INT
Kansas	Rushing	James Sims	20 rushes, 123 yards, 4 TD
Kansas	Receiving	Johnathan Wilson	5 receptions, 80 yards, TD
