= 2015 Colorado Buffaloes football team =

American college football season

2015 Colorado Buffaloes football
- Conference: Pac-12 Conference
- South Division
- Record: 4–9 (1–8 Pac-12)
- Head coach: Mike MacIntyre (3rd season)
- Offensive coordinator: Brian Lindgren (3rd season)
- Offensive scheme: Pro–style
- Defensive coordinator: Jim Leavitt (1st season)
- Base defense: 4–3
- Home stadium: Folsom Field

2015 Pac-12 Conference football standings
	Conf.			Overall
Team	W		L	W		L
North Division
No. 3 Stanford xy$	8	–	1	12	–	2
No. 19 Oregon	7	–	2	9	–	4
Washington State	6	–	3	9	–	4
California	4	–	5	8	–	5
Washington	4	–	5	7	–	6
Oregon State	0	–	9	2	–	10
South Division
USC xy	6	–	3	8	–	6
No. 17 Utah x	6	–	3	10	–	3
UCLA	5	–	4	8	–	5
Arizona State	4	–	5	6	–	7
Arizona	3	–	6	7	–	6
Colorado	1	–	8	4	–	9
Championship: Stanford 41, USC 22
$ – Conference champion; x – Division champion/co-champions; y – Championship game participant; Rankings from AP Poll

The 2015 Colorado Buffaloes football team represented the University of Colorado at Boulder during the 2015 NCAA Division I FBS football season. Led by third-year head coach Mike MacIntyre, the Buffaloes played their home games on-campus at Folsom Field in Boulder and were members of the South Division of the Pac-12 Conference. They finished the season 4–9, 1–8 in Pac-12 play to finish in last place in the South Division.

== Schedule ==
Date	Time	Opponent	Site	TV	Result	Attendance
September 3	11:00 p.m.	at Hawaii*	Aloha Stadium; Hālawa, HI	CBSSN	L 20–28	24,255
September 12	12:00 p.m.	UMass*	Folsom Field; Boulder, CO	P12N	W 48–14	35,094
September 19	5:00 p.m.	vs. Colorado State*	Sports Authority Field at Mile High; Denver, CO (Rocky Mountain Showdown)	CBSSN	W 27–24 ^{OT}	66,253
September 26	11:30 a.m.	Nicholls State*	Folsom Field; Boulder, CO	P12N	W 48–0	37,302
October 3	8:00 p.m.	Oregon	Folsom Field; Boulder, CO	ESPN	L 24–41	46,222
October 10	8:00 p.m.	at Arizona State	Sun Devil Stadium; Tempe, AZ	P12N	L 23–48	44,157
October 17	7:00 p.m.	Arizona^{†}	Folsom Field; Boulder, CO	FS1	L 31–38	39,666
October 24	8:30 p.m.	at Oregon State	Reser Stadium; Corvallis, OR	P12N	W 17–13	36,977
October 31	1:00 p.m.	at No. 24 UCLA	Rose Bowl; Pasadena, CA	P12N	L 31–35	51,508
November 7	11:00 a.m.	No. 9 Stanford	Folsom Field; Boulder, CO	P12N	L 10–42	40,142
November 13	7:00 p.m.	USC	Folsom Field; Boulder, CO	ESPN2	L 24–27	37,905
November 21	8:45 p.m.	at No. 24 Washington State	Martin Stadium; Pullman, WA	ESPN2	L 3–27	25,121
November 28	12:30 p.m.	at Utah	Rice–Eccles Stadium; Salt Lake City, UT (Rumble in the Rockies)	P12N	L 14–20	45,823
*Non-conference game; ^{†}Homecoming; Rankings from AP Poll released prior to the game; All times are in Mountain time

== Game summaries ==
=== Hawaii ===
	1	2	3	4	Total
Buffaloes	0	14	3	3	20
Rainbow Warriors	8	10	7	3	28

=== Massachusetts ===
	1	2	3	4	Total
Minutemen	7	7	0	0	14
Buffaloes	14	17	17	0	48

=== Colorado State ===
	1	2	3	4	OT	Total
Rams	14	0	3	7	0	24
Buffaloes	0	10	7	7	3	27

=== Nicholls State ===
	1	2	3	4	Total
Colonels	0	0	0	0	0
Buffaloes	21	3	17	7	48

=== Oregon ===
	1	2	3	4	Total
Ducks	7	10	14	10	41
Buffaloes	7	10	0	7	24

=== Arizona State ===
	1	2	3	4	Total
Buffaloes	7	3	7	6	23
Sun Devils	17	7	14	10	48

=== Arizona ===
	1	2	3	4	Total
Wildcats	17	0	0	21	38
Buffaloes	7	10	7	7	31

=== Oregon State ===
	1	2	3	4	Total
Buffaloes	3	7	0	7	17
Beavers	7	3	0	3	13

=== UCLA ===
	1	2	3	4	Total
Buffaloes	0	6	10	15	31
Bruins	7	14	7	7	35

=== Stanford ===
	1	2	3	4	Total
Cardinal	7	21	7	7	42
Buffaloes	7	0	3	0	10

=== USC ===
	1	2	3	4	Total
Trojans	3	3	14	7	27
Buffaloes	7	10	0	7	24

=== Washington State ===
	1	2	3	4	Total
Buffaloes	0	0	3	0	3
#24 Cougars	7	7	3	10	27

=== Utah ===
	1	2	3	4	Total
Buffaloes	0	7	0	7	14
Utes	7	3	10	0	20
