= Brian Cabral =

American football player and coach (born 1956)

Current position
- Title: Character coach
- Team: Colorado
- Conference: Pac-12

Biographical details
- Born: June 23, 1956 (age 70); Fort Benning, Georgia, U.S.

Playing career
- 1974–1977: Colorado
- 1978–1979: Atlanta Falcons
- 1980: Green Bay Packers
- 1981–1986: Chicago Bears
- Position: Linebacker

Coaching career (HC unless noted)
- 1987–1988: Purdue (ILB)
- 1989: Colorado (GA)
- 1990–2010: Colorado (ILB)
- 2010: Colorado (interim HC)
- 2010–2012: Colorado (ILB)
- 2013–2016: Indiana State (AHC/DC/LB)
- 2020–present: Colorado (character coach)

Head coaching record
- Overall: 2–1
- Bowls: 0–0

Accomplishments and honors

Awards
- Super Bowl champion (XX); Second-team All-Big Eight (1977)

Kealilhaaheo Brian David Cabral (born June 23, 1956) is an American football coach and former player. He stood in as the interim head football coach for three games at the University of Colorado at Boulder in 2010. Cabral played professionally as a linebacker in the National Football League (NFL) with the Atlanta Falcons, the Green Bay Packers, and the Chicago Bears. He won Super Bowl XX as a member of the 1985 Chicago Bears.

== College playing career ==
Cabral lettered three seasons for Colorado at linebacker from 1975 to 1977 under Coach Bill Mallory, as he was a captain and played a big role on The Buffaloes' Big Eight champion team in 1976. He led Colorado with 13 tackles (12 solo) in the 1977 Orange Bowl against Ohio State. As a senior, he was honored as the Big Eight Conference's player of the week for a monster 25 tackles in a CU 27-21 win over Stanford and shared the team's Sure Tackler Award with Mark Haynes. That 25-tackle game included 13 solo stops and is still tied for the fourth most in a single game in Colorado team history.

== NFL career ==
Cabral was a nine-year National Football League veteran, being drafted 95th overall by the Atlanta Falcons in the fourth round of the 1978 NFL draft. He played two seasons with Atlanta, one with Green Bay and six with Chicago. As the captain of the Bears' special teams, he was a member of Chicago's Super Bowl XX championship team in 1985.

== Coaching career ==
Following his NFL career, Cabral became the inside linebackers coach at Purdue for two seasons. In 1989, Cabral came back to Colorado and tutored the inside linebackers his first year as a graduate assistant. Cabral assumed full-time duties in the same capacity in 1990, and would remain in that capacity for two decades under Bill McCartney, Rick Neuheisel, Gary Barnett, Dan Hawkins and Jon Embree. From 1999 through 2005, he also coached the punt return unit on special teams, and served as the director of Colorado's summer football camps from 1995 through 2005 and for a brief time as recruiting coordinator.

Known as one of the top linebacker coaches in the nation, his students have included Matt Russell, the 1996 Butkus Award winner, all-Big Eight performers Greg Biekert, Chad Brown and Ted Johnson, all of whom went on to stardom in the National Football League, and all-Big 12 linebacker Jordon Dizon, a consensus All-American who was also the league defensive player of the year for 2007. He also recruited tailback Rashaan Salaam, the 1994 Heisman Trophy winner, and Chris Naeole, a 1996 All-American guard.

Hawkins promoted him to assistant head coach on February 7, 2008. Hawkins cited his leadership, noting that "no one person has had more influence in the success of Colorado football than Brian Cabral."

Cabral's 21 years as a full-time assistant rank as the most in Colorado athletic history, not only for football but for all sports sponsored by the University.

Cabral has served twice as interim head coach for the Buffaloes. His first stint was a three-month period in 2004 before the start of the season when Head Coach Gary Barnett was placed on paid administrative leave. In that role, he continued to coach his position players but also took care of day-to-day operational details of the program. On November 9, 2010, Cabral was again named interim head coach when Dan Hawkins was fired. He won his initial game as interim head coach against Iowa State after Hawkins firing, with Hawkins' son having his best game of the season.

In 2013, Cabral became associate head coach and defensive coordinator at Indiana State.

== Personal life ==
Cabral grew up in Kailua, Hawaii and remains involved in recruiting efforts in Hawaii for the Buffaloes. Cabral has worked youth camps in the state as well as all-Polynesian camps in the continental U.S. He is a founding board member of the Polynesian Coaches Association.

Cabral earned a B.S. degree in therapeutic recreation from Colorado in 1978.

== Head coaching record ==
Year	Team	Overall	Conference	Standing
Colorado Buffaloes (Big 12 Conference) (2010)
2010	Colorado	2–1^{‡}	2–1^{‡}	5th (North)
Colorado:		2–1	2–1	^{‡} Named interim head coach on November 9
Total:		2–1		
