= Chidera Uzo-Diribe =

American football coach (born 1992)

Dallas Cowboys
- Title: Outside linebackers coach

Personal information
- Born: May 30, 1992 (age 34); Long Beach, California, U.S.
- Listed height: 6 ft 2 in (1.88 m)
- Listed weight: 252 lb (114 kg)

Career information
- College: Colorado

Career history

Playing
- New Orleans Saints (2014)*
- * Offseason or practice squad member only

Coaching
- Colorado (2016–2018) Graduate assistant; Kansas (2019) Defensive quality control coach; Kansas (2020) Outside linebackers coach; SMU (2021) Defensive line coach; TCU (2022) Defensive line coach; Georgia (2022–2025) Outside linebackers coach; Dallas Cowboys (2026–present) Outside linebackers coach

Awards and highlights
- National champion (2022)

Chidera Uzo-Diribe (born May 30, 1992) is an American football coach and former player who currently serves as the outside linebackers coach for the Dallas Cowboys of the National Football League (NFL). He previously served as the outside linebackers coach for the Georgia Bulldogs.

== Early life and playing career ==
Chidera Uzo-Diribe was born on May 30, 1992, in Long Beach, California. He is cousins with Osi Umenyiora, a former NFL player for the New York Giants. After completing high school at Corona High School, Uzo-Diribe attended University of Colorado Boulder and played college football for the Colorado Buffaloes for four years, where he was a consistent starter and finished top ten in many defensive statistics. Uzo-Diribe graduated from Colorado with a bachelor's degree in communication, and a masters degree in learning sciences and human development in 2018 from the School of Education at the University of Colorado Boulder.

Pre-draft measurables
Height	Weight	Arm length	Hand span	Wingspan	40-yard dash	10-yard split	20-yard split	20-yard shuttle	Three-cone drill	Vertical jump	Broad jump	Bench press
6 ft 2 1/4 in (1.89 m)	252 lb (114 kg)	33 in (0.84 m)	9 3/8 in (0.24 m)	6 ft 5 1/2 in (1.97 m)	4.67 s	1.66 s	2.72 s	4.52 s	7.19 s	35.0 in (0.89 m)	10 ft 1 in (3.07 m)	21 reps
All values from Pro Day

After going undrafted in the 2014 NFL draft, Uzo-Diribe signed with the New Orleans Saints on May 11, 2014. He was later waived on August 30, 2014.

== Coaching career ==
After graduating from Colorado and a brief stint with the New Orleans Saints, Uzo-Diribe returned to become a graduate assistant for the football team and specialized in the defensive line and outside linebacker players. After three years as a graduate assistant, Uzo-Diribe became the outside linebackers coach for the Kansas Jayhawks, where he was recognized as one of the top thirty rising coaches in college football. Uzo-Diribe then became the defensive line coach for the SMU in 2021. Following the hiring of Sonny Dykes by the TCU Horned Frogs as head coach, Uzo-Diribe rejoined Dykes in TCU as the defensive line coach again. However, Uzo-Diribe only remained the defensive line coach at TCU for a month, as he was hired as the outside linebackers coach by the Georgia Bulldogs early in the 2022 college football year. Later that year, Uzo-Diribe would win his first college football national championship as a coach, which coincidently was against Dykes and TCU.

On February 3, 2026, Uzo-Diribe was hired by the Dallas Cowboys as the team's outside linebackers coach.
