= 2009 Colorado Buffaloes football team =

American college football season

2009 Colorado Buffaloes football
- Conference: Big 12 Conference
- North
- Record: 3–9 (2–6 Big 12)
- Head coach: Dan Hawkins (4th season)
- Offensive coordinator: Eric Kiesau (1st season)
- Offensive scheme: Multiple
- Defensive coordinator: Ron Collins (4th season)
- Base defense: 4–3
- Home stadium: Folsom Field

Uniform

2009 Big 12 Conference football standings
	Conf.			Overall
Team	W		L	W		L
North Division
No. 14 Nebraska x	6	–	2	10	–	4
Missouri	4	–	4	8	–	5
Kansas State	4	–	4	6	–	6
Iowa State	3	–	5	7	–	6
Colorado	2	–	6	3	–	9
Kansas	1	–	7	5	–	7
South Division
No. 2 Texas x$	8	–	0	13	–	1
Oklahoma State	6	–	2	9	–	4
No. 21 Texas Tech	5	–	3	9	–	4
Oklahoma	5	–	3	8	–	5
Texas A&M	3	–	5	6	–	7
Baylor	1	–	7	4	–	8
Championship: Texas 13, Nebraska 12
$ – BCS representative as conference champion; x – Division champion/co-champions; Rankings from AP Poll

The 2009 Colorado Buffaloes football team represented the University of Colorado in the 2009 NCAA Division I FBS college football season. The Buffaloes were led by fourth-year head coach Dan Hawkins and played their home games at Folsom Field. The Buffaloes finished the season with a record of 3–9 and 2–6 in Big 12 play.

== Schedule ==
Date	Time	Opponent	Site	TV	Result	Attendance	Source
September 6	5:00 p.m.	Colorado State*	Folsom Field; Boulder, CO (Rocky Mountain Showdown)	FSN	L 17–23	53,168	
September 11	7:00 p.m.	at Toledo*	Glass Bowl; Toledo, OH	ESPN	L 38–54	20,082	
September 19	1:30 p.m.	Wyoming*	Folsom Field; Boulder, CO	FCS	W 24–0	50,535	
October 1	5:45 p.m.	at West Virginia*	Milan Puskar Stadium; Morgantown, WV	ESPN	L 24–35	60,055	
October 10	5:00 p.m.	at No. 2 Texas	Darrell K Royal–Texas Memorial Stadium; Austin, TX	ESPN	L 14–38	101,152	
October 17	5:00 p.m.	No. 17 Kansas	Folsom Field; Boulder, CO	FSN	W 34–30	51,146	
October 24	10:30 a.m.	at Kansas State	Bill Snyder Family Football Stadium; Manhattan, KS (rivalry)	FCS	L 6–20	42,019	
October 31	11:30 a.m.	Missouri^{†}	Folsom Field; Boulder, CO	FSN	L 17–36	45,634	
November 7	11:30 a.m.	Texas A&M	Folsom Field; Boulder, CO	FCS	W 35–34	47,227	
November 14	12:00 p.m.	at Iowa State	Jack Trice Stadium; Ames, IA		L 10–17	43,208	
November 19	5:45 p.m.	at No. 12 Oklahoma State	Boone Pickens Stadium; Stillwater, OK	ESPN	L 28–31	50,080	
November 27	1:30 p.m.	Nebraska	Folsom Field; Boulder, CO (rivalry)	ABC	L 20–28	52,817	
*Non-conference game; ^{†}Homecoming; Rankings from AP Poll released prior to the game; All times are in Mountain time
