= Sefo Liufau =

American football player (born 1994)

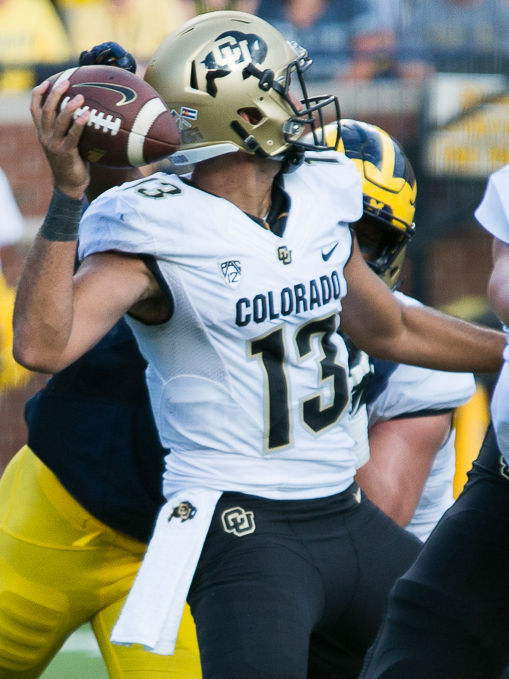

Profile
- Position: Quarterback

Personal information
- Born: October 29, 1994 (age 32); Tacoma, Washington, U.S.
- Listed height: 6 ft 4 in (1.93 m)
- Listed weight: 230 lb (104 kg)

Career information
- High school: Bellarmine Prep (Tacoma)
- College: Colorado (2013–2016)
- NFL draft: 2017: undrafted

Career history

Playing
- Tampa Bay Buccaneers (2017)*
- * Offseason or practice squad member only

Coaching
- Bellarmine Prep (2021–present) Offensive coordinator

Awards and highlights
- Polynesian College Football Player of the Year (2016)
- Stats at Pro Football Reference

Iosefo Sua Liufau (born October 29, 1994) is an American former professional football player who was a quarterback in the National Football League (NFL). He played college football for the Colorado Buffaloes.

== Early life ==
Liufau attended Bellarmine Preparatory School in Tacoma, Washington. During his career he led the team to a 34–5 record, while completing 522 of 838 passes for 7,297 yards and 68 touchdowns. He committed to the University of Colorado Boulder to play college football.

== College career ==
During his career as a Colorado Buffalo, Liufau played in 41 games and made a school record 39 starts. He also set 98 other school records including career passing touchdowns (60) and passing yards (9,763). As a senior, he was named the Polynesian College Football Player of the Year.

== Professional career ==
After going undrafted in the 2017 NFL draft, Liufau signed with the Tampa Bay Buccaneers as an undrafted free agent on May 1, 2017. He was waived by the Buccaneers on September 2, 2017. He announced his retirement on January 6, 2018. He now coaches at his former high-school Bellarmine Prep, where he serves as the offensive coordinator.
