= Tyler Hansen =

American football player (born 1989)

No. 12
- Position: Quarterback

Personal information
- Born: December 6, 1989 (age 36); Escondido, California, U.S.
- Listed height: 6 ft 2 in (1.88 m)
- Listed weight: 220 lb (100 kg)

Career information
- High school: Temecula (CA) Chaparral
- College: Colorado
- NFL draft: 2012: undrafted

Career history
- Cincinnati Bengals (2012)*; Los Angeles KISS (2014)
- * Offseason or practice squad member only

Career AFL statistics
- Comp. / Att.: 10 / 29
- Passing yards: 100
- TD–INT: 2-4
- Passer rating: 22.84
- Rushing TD: 1
- Stats at ArenaFan.com

Tyler Hansen (born December 6, 1989) is an American former football quarterback. He was signed by the Cincinnati Bengals as an undrafted free agent in 2012. He played college football at the University of Colorado.

Hansen made his professional debut in 2014 with the Los Angeles KISS of the Arena Football League (AFL).
