= National Signing Day =

Day students can sign for a collegiate team

National Signing Day has traditionally been the first day that a high school senior can sign a binding National Letter of Intent for a collegiate sport with a school that is a Division II member of the National Collegiate Athletic Association (NCAA) in the United States.

Although all NCAA Division I and II sports have at least one national signing day, college football's signing days typically receive the most attention from sports media. Traditionally, college football's National Signing Day is the first Wednesday of February. As of 2017, college football has an additional National Signing Day for early signees during the third week of December, meaning recruits have the opportunity to sign with their college team over a month before the regular signing period.

== History ==
Until 1981, several college football conferences, including the Southeastern Conference (SEC) and Atlantic Coast Conference (ACC), held conference signing days on the second Saturday in December to have recruits sign conference letters-of-intent. The College Football Association, led by several prominent college head football coaches, proposed a resolution to eliminate conference signing days during their 1980 convention, and have a singular signing day in their places, called a national signing day. In 1981, the last year for conference signing days, recruits had to sign both conference and national letters-of-intent if their school was in the Big Eight or Southwest Conferences (four members of the latter conference later joined the former, which became known as the Big 12 Conference after the expansion). The conference letters-of-intent restricted a recruit to signing with only one school in a conference, but was unrestricted to signing with a school outside of the conference. The national letters-of-intent restricted a recruit to signing with only one school in the NCAA. National Signing Day has typically been on the first Wednesday in February.

In April 2017, the NCAA Division I Council voted to reinstate an early signing period in football, effective with the 2017–18 school year. The Collegiate Commissioners Association approved the new NCAA rule the following month, setting the early signing window for high schoolers as the first three days of the current early signing window for junior college players.

On October 9, 2024, the NCAA Division I Council abolished the NLI program for that division, effective immediately. The NLI was replaced by written offers of athletic financial aid that provide most of the NLI's core functions. The abolition of the NLI in Division I was reportedly tied to the settlement of the House v. NCAA legal case, expected to lead to a revenue-sharing model across college sports.
