= 2006 Colorado Buffaloes football team =

American college football season

2006 Colorado Buffaloes football
- Conference: Big 12 Conference
- North
- Record: 2–10 (2–6 Big 12)
- Head coach: Dan Hawkins (1st season)
- Offensive coordinator: Mark Helfrich (1st season)
- Defensive coordinator: Ron Collins (1st season)
- Base defense: 4–3 Cover 2
- Home stadium: Folsom Field (Capacity: 53,750)

2006 Big 12 Conference football standings
	Conf.			Overall
Team	W		L	W		L
North Division
Nebraska x	6	–	2	9	–	5
Missouri	4	–	4	8	–	5
Kansas State	4	–	4	7	–	6
Kansas	3	–	5	6	–	6
Colorado	2	–	6	2	–	10
Iowa State	1	–	7	4	–	8
South Division
No. 11 Oklahoma x$	7	–	1	11	–	3
No. 13 Texas	6	–	2	10	–	3
Texas A&M	5	–	3	9	–	4
Texas Tech	4	–	4	8	–	5
Oklahoma State	3	–	5	7	–	6
Baylor	3	–	5	4	–	8
Championship: Oklahoma 21, Nebraska 7
$ – BCS representative as conference champion; x – Division champion/co-champions; Rankings from AP Poll

The 2006 Colorado Buffaloes football team represented the University of Colorado at Boulder in the 2006 NCAA Division I FBS football season. The previous year's team won the Big 12 North Conference. That marked the fourth Big 12 North championship for Colorado in the past five years. The team has its 23rd new head coach Dan Hawkins. The Sporting News gave out the only A+ to Colorado in the category of coaching hire. The Buffaloes played their home games in Folsom Field.

They finished the season 2–10 (2–6 in the Big 12 Conference) and had some major disappointments. Mason Crosby did not perform as well as last season (19 for 27) and the Hawkins era didn't start as many had expected with his success at Boise State. The offense appeared to struggle to learn the new system and early quarterback uncertainty did not allow the team to have consistency. The defense performed excellently at times and was good overall, but without the offense producing points, Colorado would lose, though many games were close.

== Schedule ==
Date	Time	Opponent	Site	TV	Result	Attendance	Source
September 2	1:30 pm	Montana State*	Folsom Field; Boulder, CO	BV	L 10–19	45,513	
September 9	3:00 pm	vs. Colorado State*	Invesco Field at Mile High; Denver, CO (Rocky Mountain Showdown)	CSTV	L 10–14	65,701	
September 16	5:00 pm	No. 22 Arizona State*	Folsom Field; Boulder, CO	TBS	L 3–21	47,723	
September 23	10:30 am	at No. 9 Georgia*	Sanford Stadium; Athens, GA	LFS	L 13–14	92,746	
September 30	10:30 am	at No. 25 Missouri	Faurot Field; Columbia, MO	FSN	L 13–28	57,824	
October 7	1:30 pm	Baylor^{†}	Folsom Field; Boulder, CO		L 31–34 ^{3OT}	47,065	
October 14	1:30 pm	Texas Tech	Folsom Field; Boulder, CO		W 30–6	50,233	
October 21	5:00 pm	at No. 20 Oklahoma	Gaylord Family Oklahoma Memorial Stadium; Norman, OK	FSN	L 3–24	84,443	
October 28	12:00 pm	at Kansas	Memorial Stadium; Lawrence, KS		L 15–20	39,313	
November 4	1:30 pm	Kansas State	Folsom Field; Boulder, CO (rivalry)	FSN	L 21–34	42,696	
November 11	1:00 pm	Iowa State	Folsom Field; Boulder, CO		W 33–16	43,056	
November 24	1:30 pm	at No. 23 Nebraska	Memorial Stadium; Lincoln, NE (rivalry)	ABC	L 14–37	85,800	
*Non-conference game; ^{†}Homecoming; Rankings from AP Poll released prior to the game; All times are in Mountain time

== Preseason ==
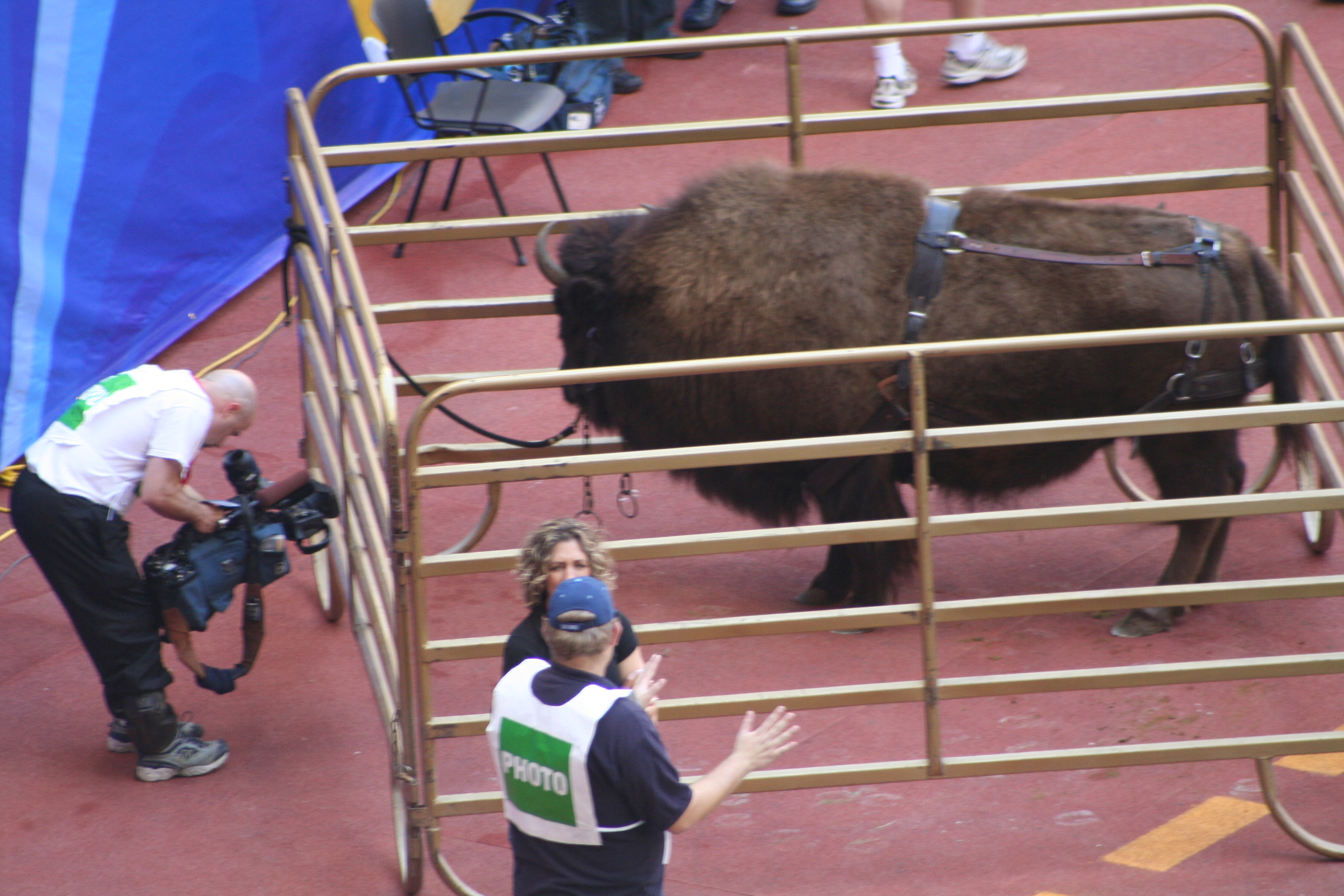
Ralphie is ready for a new season

With a new head coach, a new offensive system and the loss of several key players such as Joel Klatt (QB), Joe Klopfenstein (TE), Quinn Sypniewski (TE), Lawrence Vickers (TB) and John Torp (P), Colorado faced some challenges to hang on to their Big 12 North Title. (Jeremy Bloom, listed in the 2006 NFL draft as being from Colorado had not played football for Colorado since the 2004 season and thus is not a loss for this year)

Colorado did not appear in any of the Top 25 pre-season rankings (#26 in Collegefootballnews.com), and was selected to finish third in the Big 12 North with 2 selections to finish first in the Big 12 North.

Colorado played their first Division I-AA opponent ever, Montana State, on September 2. Colorado was one of the last 9 Division I-A schools, at the time, to have never played a Division I-AA or Division II school. The California Golden Bears also lost that status in 2006. The remaining seven teams were the (Michigan Wolverines, Michigan State Spartans, Notre Dame Fighting Irish, Ohio State Buckeyes, USC Trojans, UCLA Bruins and Washington Huskies).

Tyrone Henderson and Gerett Burl, starters in the 2005–06 season, were permanently released from the team prior to fall practice. Both were in CU's top 5 tacklers for last season, having started 25 games between them.

James Cox was named the starting quarterback to replace Klatt on August 20. Despite having missed most of spring practice with a broken thumb, Coach Hawkins picked the senior over juniors Brian White and Bernard Jackson saying his seniority wasn't a factor and he simply wanted the best players on the field. With one year left of eligibility, Cox has seen playing time the previous 3 seasons behind Klatt, with two starts to his credit: the 2005 Champs Sports Bowl and in 2004 against Iowa State. In the 14 games he has played in prior to the 2006 season, his stats are 42 of 79 attempts for 423 yards with 3 interception and 2 Touchdowns passing and 37 yards rushing in 20 attempts with 1 TD (5 sacks for 28 yards).

The captains for 2006 were Mason Crosby, Brian Daniels and Thaddaeus Washington.

=== Preseason awards ===
See for full information on pre-season awards. Note: Only first team All-American or All-Conference listed.

- Mason Crosby
  - Lou Groza
  - All-America (Athlon, ATS Consultants, CBS Sportsline.com, collegefootballnews.com, Lindy's Big 12 Football, Football.com, Football News, Nationalchamps.net, Phil Steele's College Football, Playboy, Rivals.com, The Sporting News, Sports Illustrated, Street & Smith's)
  - All-Big 12 Football Team (Athlon, ATS Consultants, Big 12 Summer Media Poll, CBS SportsLine.com, collegefootballnews.com, Huskers Illustrated, Lindy’s Big 12 Football, Phil Steele’s College Football, The Sporting News, Street & Smith’s, USA Today Sports Weekly)
- Mark Fenton
  - Outland Trophy
  - Rimington Trophy
  - Lombardi Award
  - All-America (Street & Smith's)
  - All-Big 12 Football Team (Athlon, ATS Consultants, Big 12 Summer Media Poll, CBS SportsLine.com, collegefootballnews.com, Huskers Illustrated, Lindy’s Big 12 Football, Phil Steele’s College Football, The Sporting News, Street & Smith’s, USA Today Sports Weekly)
- Thaddaeus Washington
  - Bronko Nagurski Trophy
  - Butkus Award
  - Lombardi Award
  - Preseason All-Big 12 Football Team (Athlon, ATS Consultants, Big 12 Summer Media Poll, CBS SportsLine.com, collegefootballnews.com, Huskers Illustrated, Lindy’s Big 12 Football, The Sporting News, USA Today Sports Weekly)

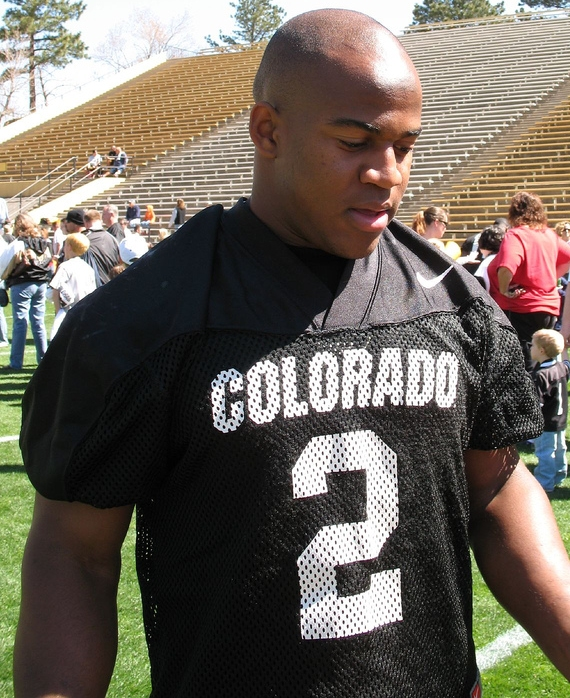
Hugh Charles before the 2007 spring game, April 14, 2007.

- Hugh Charles
  - Heisman Trophy (#74 by collegefootballnews.com)
  - Doak Walker Award
  - Street & Smith's Big 12 Best Athlete
- Brian Daniels
  - Outland Trophy
  - All Big 12 Conference (Phil Steele’s College Football)
- Abraham Wright
  - Ted Hendricks Award

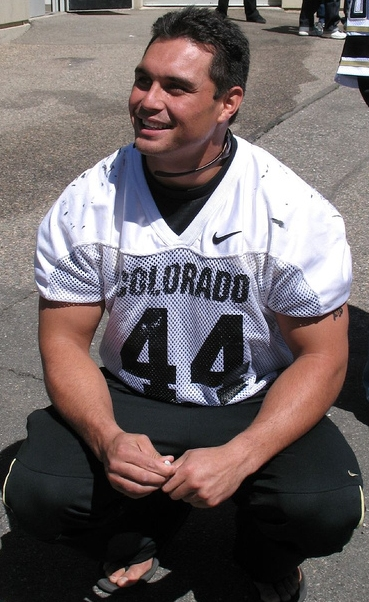
Jordon Dizon before the 2007 spring game, April 14, 2007.

- Jordon Dizon
  - Butkus Award
  - All Big 12 Conference (Street & Smith’s)
- J. J. Billingsley
  - All Big 12 Conference (Athlon, collegefootballnews.com, Lindy’s Big 12 Football, USA Today Sports Weekly)
- Stephone Robinson
  - All Big 12 Conference (CBS SportsLine.com)
- Terrence Wheatley
  - All Big 12 Conference (Phil Steele’s College Football)

== Game summaries ==
=== Montana State ===
Team	1	2	3	4	Total
• Montana State	3	3	7	6	19
Colorado	3	7	0	0	10

- Date: September 2
- Location: Folsom Field, Boulder, CO
- Game attendance: 45,513
- TV announcers (Buff Vision): Mark Johnson (Play-by-play), Larry Zimmer (Color), & Bobby Anderson (Sideline)

Colorado's season began against Division I-AA opponent Montana State on September 2. Colorado needed to add an opponent with the schedule increase to a 12-game regular season and could not find another I-A opponent. Montana State was ranked No. 19 in the I-AA Pre-season Poll. MSU finished 7–4 in the 2005 season. Starting off with this soft opponent will allow the Buffaloes to gage how the players have adopted the new system. However, Colorado has played Montana State 3 times with the last time in 1927. MSU leads the series 2–1–0 with the series tied (1–1) in Boulder. Although the schools have not played football against each other in 8 decades, they are rivals in the Rocky Mountain Intercollegiate Ski Association competing weekly.

Prior to this game, Colorado has won its last 20 season openers when it scores first, 4–14–1 when its opponent scores first in season openers and 73–38–5 in the 116-year history. In Boulder season openers, Colorado is 53–18–1 and 36–17 in Folsom Field. Dan Hawkins is 7–3 in season openers at the Division I-A level. Colorado coaches are 9–12–1 in their first game as head coach. The last coach to win his premiere was Rick Neuheisel, and before that was in 1932.

Colorado paid US$275,000 to Montana State for the game which showed Colorado had not yet figured out the new system. James Cox went 8–22 for 110 yards passing and Colorado had 106 yards rushing. The defense held two goal line stances to allow only field goals but the offense could not produce the needed points late in the game. Despite this limited success on defense, Freshman CB Cha'pelle Brown consistently failed to defend against the pass and Senior safety J. J. Billingsley missed too many tackles. Mason Crosby missed a 63-yard field goal that was well short. This loss extended the losing streak to 5 games.

For detailed information on the game stats see footnote and play-by-play summary see

=== Colorado State ===
Team	1	2	3	4	Total
Colorado	7	3	0	0	10
• Colorado St	7	7	0	0	14

- Date: September 9
- Location: Invesco Field at Mile High, Denver, CO
- Game attendance: 65,701
- TV announcers (CSTV): Tom Hart (Play-by-play), Trev Alberts (Color), & Anne Marie Anderson (Sideline)

The 2006 Rocky Mountain Showdown took place on September 9 at a neutral site, Invesco Field in Denver, Colorado. Colorado State University finished 6–6 in 2005. It was the 78th meeting, with the Buffaloes leading the series 57–18–2. The last ten games the Buffaloes won 7–3. They last played each other in 2005. The last four games were decided by 18 points total.

The game was broadcast on CSTV. Colorado could have lost out on US$400,000 from the Big 12 Conference since the game may not have met the classification of being nationally televised due to the limited market of CSTV. Big 12 pays its members if a televised game reaches 42 million homes. CSTV is available in 54 million homes, but only has 15–20 million subscribers. If the game meets the mark with last-minute deals with other networks, CSU is guaranteed $50,000 of the money in the contract. Failing to meet the number will not only cause the loss of money, but may affect future contracts and the future of the Rocky Mountain Showdown. On Thursday before the game, the Colorado Buffaloes announced that OLN would simulcast the show, increasing the coverage of the game.

In a surprise, Bernard Jackson got the start at quarterback (QB) instead of Cox. Cox saw limited action throughout the game. Jackson scored on a 3-yard touchdown (TD) run on a naked bootleg play to open the game and Colorado State answered later in the first quarter with their own QB, Caleb Hanie, scoring a 5-yard TD on an option play. Mason Crosby kicked a 43-yard field goal in the second quarter but the Rams then scored another TD with a 6-yard pass to TE Kory Sperry. The Buffaloes mis-managed the clock at the end of the first half and failed to get Crosby a chance at an approximately 52-yard field goal.

Crosby missed a 61-yard field goal to wind up the opening drive for the Buffaloes in the second half (he had made it when the play initially went but it was whistled dead because Colorado State had taken a timeout – it would have been the longest of his career). Colorado State's Jason Smith missed a 34-yard field goal in the fourth quarter. Colorado failed to answer the Rams in the second half. The defense played quite well, recording many sacks and limiting the Rams. The missed field goal and missed chance at a field goal along with a near perfect performance by Hanie proved costly to the Buffaloes.

Following the game, Brian White told Hawkins he was quitting the team. He intended to transfer to another school where he can receive more playing time. Tight end Patrick Devenny may move to the QB position to fill the hole for the season.

=== Arizona State ===
Team	1	2	3	4	Total
• Arizona State	7	7	0	7	21
Colorado	3	0	0	0	3

- Date: September 16
- Location: Folsom Field, Boulder, CO
- Game attendance: 47,723
- TV announcers (TBS): Ron Thulin (Play-by-play), Charles Davis (Color), & Craig Sager (Sideline)

This was the first meeting between the two schools. Arizona State went 7–5 in 2005. The game was broadcast on TBS. Colorado's only score came on a fumble recovery deep in Arizona State territory. Colorado failed to move the ball effectively and had fumble problems throughout the game. This marks the seventh straight loss (including last season) for Colorado, which they haven't done since 1980. Jackson remained as the starting quarterback.

=== Georgia ===
Team	1	2	3	4	Total
Colorado	3	7	3	0	13
• Georgia	0	0	0	14	14

- Date: September 23
- Location: Sanford Stadium, Athens, GA
- Game attendance: 92,746
- TV announcers (LFS): Dave Neal (Play-by-play), Dave Rowe (Color), & Dave Baker (Sideline)

This was the first meeting between the two schools. Georgia went 10–3 in 2005. The two teams are scheduled to play each other again in 2010. CU Quarterback Cox missed the game due to the death of his father. Coach Hawkins son, true freshman Cody Hawkins, was the backup to Jackson and redshirt freshman Patrick Devenny, who converted from quarterback to tight end this fall, was the emergency backup. Georgia was 3–0 and ranked No. 9 in the AP Poll and No. 7 in the Coaches Poll coming into the game. This was the first game against a SEC opponent for Colorado since 1980. Colorado has not lost 8 straight games since the 1962–63 seasons. Ralphie is also making the trip with an ESPN producer and cameraman documenting the trip to appear on College GameDay Saturday.

The game was televised as part of the SEC syndicated package produced by Lincoln Financial Sports and was also picked up locally in the Denver/Boulder market on KTVD My20 (Comcast's Channel 3 in Denver area), KRDO-TV (Colorado Springs) and KJCT-TV (Grand Junction) also picked up the broadcasts for their markets.

Colorado lead for the entire game until Georgia backup quarterback Cox (no relation to James) came in the 4th quarter and threw two touchdown passes, the second with 41 seconds left in the game to pull out the Buffaloes upset hopes. Colorado center Mark Fenton suffered a broken fibula during the second quarter of the game. He will miss most or all of the rest of this season. Bryce MacMartin is the replacement.

=== Missouri ===
Team	1	2	3	4	Total
Colorado	3	3	7	0	13
• Missouri	14	7	7	0	28

- Date: September 30
- Location: Faurot Field, Columbia, MO
- Game attendance: 57,824
- TV announcers (FSN): Bill Land (Play-by-play), Gary Reasons (Color), & Emily Jones (Sideline)

This game signaled the start of conference play for the Buffaloes. University of Missouri went 7–5 in 2005. This was the 71st meeting between the two with Missouri leading the series 36–31–3 coming into the game. However, Colorado has taken 7 of the last 10 games. They played each other in 2005 where Missouri went 7–5 that season.

Missouri was 4–0 coming into this game and was ranked No. 25 in the AP Poll and No. 24 in the Harris Poll. Colorado was in its longest losing streak since the Eddie Crowder era and had not been 0–4 to start the season since 1986. Both defenses were excelling: Missouri, ranked fifth nationally against the run in allowing 43.8 yards per game and had limited its opponents to 1.59 yards per carry; Colorado was ranked 16th, as opponents had averaged 75.3 yards per game and just 2.26 yards per attempt.

=== Baylor ===
Team	1	2	3	4	OT	2OT	3OT	Total
• Baylor	0	10	0	7	7	7	3	34
Colorado	7	0	3	7	7	7	0	31

- Date: October 7
- Location: Folsom Field, Boulder, CO
- Game attendance: 47,065

The Big 12 South's Baylor came to Boulder for the 14th match-up between the schools and Colorado's Homecoming game. They last played in 2003, and Colorado led the series 8–5 and Colorado had also won 7 of the last 10 games. Baylor went 5–6 in 2005.

Baylor won in 3 overtimes, kicking a field goal in the 3rd OT while the Buffaloes' Jackson threw an interception to end the game. This ties the Colorado record for consecutive losses (10) which last happened in the 1963 to 1964 seasons. This was Baylor's second Big 12 Conference road win ever.

=== Texas Tech ===
Team	1	2	3	4	Total
Texas Tech	0	0	0	6	6
• Colorado	7	13	3	7	30

- Date: October 14
- Location: Folsom Field, Boulder, Colorado
- Game start: 1:30 p.m. MST
- Game attendance: 50,233

Scoring summary
1	10:59	Colorado	Riar Geer 28-yard pass from Bernard Jackson (Mason Crosby kick)	Colorado 7-0
2	12:55	Colorado	Jarrell Yates 29-yard pass from Bernard Jackson (Mason Crosby kick)	Colorado 14-0
2	5:47	Colorado	Mason Crosby 56-yard field goal	Colorado 17-0
2	0:05	Colorado	Mason Crosby 26-yard field goal	Colorado 20-0
3	4:06	Colorado	Mason Crosby 53-yard field goal	Colorado 23-0
4	9:04	Texas Tech	Danny Amendola 11-yard pass from Graham Harrell (run failed)	Colorado 23-6
4	3:27	Colorado	Bernard Jackson 1-yard run (Mason Crosby kick)	Colorado 30-6

Texas Tech played Colorado during Family Weekend at CU. This was only the 8th meeting between the schools with Texas Tech leading the series 4–3–0 coming into the game. The schools last met in 2003. Texas Tech went 9–3 last season.

Buffalo fans stormed the field after Colorado's win over Texas Tech. Dan Hawkins' first victory at Colorado and the Buffaloes first of the 2006 season ending the losing streak tying the Colorado record of 10 straight. The defense shut down Tech's passing game with three interceptions and holding them to 6 points when their per game average was 31.7 going into the game. The offense started performing to their capabilities producing a 119 yard rusher in Hugh Charles which is the most that Tech has given up this season. Crosby also performed well kicking 3 field goals, including a 56-yard field goal which is the second longest in NCAA Division I this season.

Crosby and sophomore free safety Ryan Walters were named Big 12 Players of the Week for their performance in the game. Walters caught two interceptions, the first of his career, both on third down in CU territory.

See also footnote

=== Oklahoma ===
Colorado Buffaloes (1–6) at #20 Oklahoma Sooners (4–2)

Quarter	1	2	3	4	Total
Colorado	0	0	0	3	3
Oklahoma	10	0	0	14	24

at Gaylord Family Oklahoma Memorial Stadium • Norman, Oklahoma

- Date: October 21
- Game time: 6:00 p.m. CDT
- Game weather: Overcast • 46 °F (8 °C) • Wind N 24 miles per hour (39 km/h; 21 kn)
- Game attendance: 84,443
- Referee: Clete Blakeman
- TV announcers (FSN): Joel Meyers, Dave Lapham, & Jim Knox
- Game Summary

Game information

Colorado

- Bernard Jackson
  3/14, 39 Yds, INT
  10 Rush, 54 Yds
- Cody Crawford
  1 Rec, 22 Yds

Oklahoma

- Paul Thompson
  17/26, 105 Yds, TD
- Allen Patrick
  35 Rush, 110 Yds, TD
- Malcolm Kelly
  7 Rec, 64 Yds

This was the most difficult opponent in 2006 for the Buffaloes, since Oklahoma had been selected No. 1 in four preseason polls. The main threat, Adrian Peterson on his run for the Heisman Trophy, was injured the previous week. Oklahoma had a disappointing 2005 going 8–4. This was the 57th meeting with Oklahoma dominating the series 38–16–2, but Colorado has taken 5 of the last 10 (5–4–1). They last played each other in 2004. Oklahoma is ranked No. 20 in the Coaches Poll and AP Poll going into this game.

Colorado managed to hold Oklahoma close for most of the game. Crosby kept Colorado's scoring streak alive (208 straight games) for the 6th time in his career. But in the end, Colorado's woes on offense continues while the defense kept the game respectable.

Scoring summary

Quarter	Time	Drive			Team	Scoring information	Score	
Quarter	Time	Plays	Yards	TOP	Team	Scoring information	COL	OKLA
1	7:49	12	61	5:20	Oklahoma	Manuel Johnson 3-yard touchdown reception from Paul Thompson, Garrett Hartley kick good	0	7
1	0:04	6	17	2:17	Oklahoma	46-yard field goal by Garrett Hartley	0	10
4	10:26	12	54	4:51	Oklahoma	Allen Patrick 2-yard touchdown run, Garrett Hartley kick good	0	17
4	6:13	11	51	4:00	Colorado	39-yard field goal by Mason Crosby	3	17
4	0:17	12	43	5:49	Oklahoma	Chris Brown 4-yard touchdown run, Garrett Hartley kick good	3	24
"TOP" = time of possession. For other American football terms, see Glossary of American football.							3	24

=== Kansas ===
Team	1	2	3	4	Total
Colorado	3	6	0	6	15
• Kansas	0	0	7	13	20

- Date: October 28
- Location: Memorial Stadium, Lawrence, KS
- Game attendance: 39,313

This was the 66th match-up between the schools, with Colorado leading 41–21–3 and 8–2 in the last 10. They last played in 2005. Kansas went 7–5 last season.

Mason Crosby had an excellent day kicking and providing the only scoring going 3 for 3 on field goals including 26, 32 and 37 yards putting Colorado up 9–0 at halftime. James Cox broke his right thumb in the second quarter making Patrick Devenny the QB backup. Colorado may go winless on the road for the first time since 1984 since their only game left on the road is against ranked Nebraska. Kansas started a new quarterback for the second half that proved to be the difference in the game. Freshman Todd Reesing came in and rallied Kansas throwing for 2 touchdowns and running for another to beat Colorado.

=== Kansas State ===
Team	1	2	3	4	Total
• Kansas State	0	17	0	17	34
Colorado	0	0	7	14	21

- Date: November 4
- Location: Folsom Field, Boulder, CO
- Game attendance: 42,696
- TV announcers (FSN): Joel Meyers (Play-by-play), Dave Lapham (Color), & Jim Knox (Sideline)

Kansas State also has a new head coach, Ron Prince, this season. They went 5–6 last season. This was the 62nd match-up between the teams with Colorado in the lead 43–17–1, but they have split the last 10 games (5–5). They last played in 2005.

Despite having the two longest running plays of the season, Colorado failed to rally to meet Kansas State.

=== Iowa State ===
Team	1	2	3	4	Total
Iowa State	7	0	3	6	16
• Colorado	10	10	10	3	33

- Date: November 11
- Location: Folsom Field, Boulder, CO
- Game attendance: 43,056

Iowa State went 7–5 in 2005. This was the 60th match-up between the schools and Colorado is dominating 46–13–1 in the series and 8–2 in the last ten (prior to this game). They last played in 2005.

Colorado got its second win of the season. Iowa State's head coach Dan McCarney announced the week before the game he was resigning his position. Crosby went 4–5 in field goals and 3–3 in PATs. This was the last home game of the season and the last home game for Colorado's seniors. Jackson had a career performance day throwing for 200 yards, including 2 TDs and running for another 69 yard TD. However, Hawkins stated that Jackson has no guarantee of being the starting QB next season.

=== Nebraska ===
Team	1	2	3	4	Total
Colorado	7	0	7	0	14
• Nebraska	7	7	7	16	37

- Date: November 24
- Location: Memorial Stadium, Lincoln, NE
- Game attendance: 85,800
- TV announcers (ABC): Mark Jones (Play-by-play), David Norrie (Color), & Bonnie Bernstein (Sideline)

This was the 65th meeting between the teams with Nebraska clearly in control of the series 45–17–2 and 7–3 in the last 10. Nebraska went 8–4 last season and beat Colorado 30–3 in part of the tailspin of Colorado of the 2005 season. Colorado failed to prevent just its third 10-loss season in 117 years of intercollegiate football (going 1–10 in 1980 and 1984) as well as to end a 13-game losing streak to ranked teams. Nebraska had already captured the Big 12 North Division title and a bowl game yet to be determined. Colorado won’t be going to a bowl for just the fifth time since 1984, and this is just school’s fourth losing season in that time frame (1997, 2000, 2003 and 2006).

== Personnel ==
=== Coaching staff ===
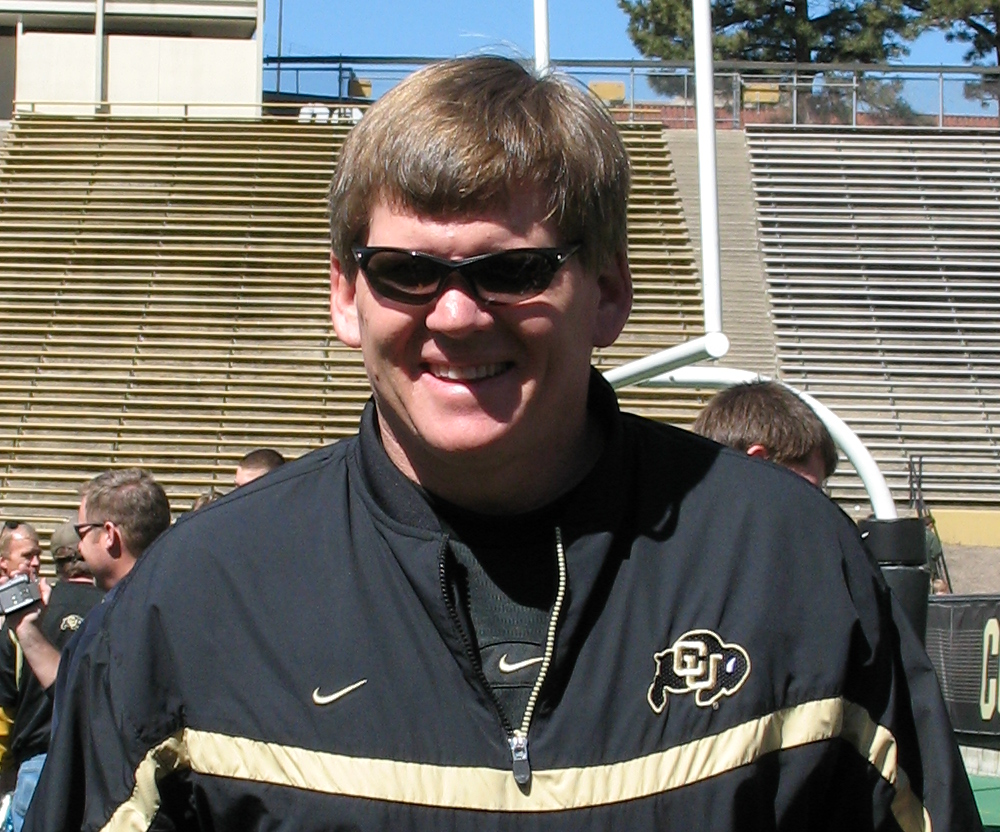
Dan Hawkins

Name	Position	Years at CU	Alma mater (year)
Dan Hawkins	Head coach	0	University of California, Davis (1984)
Chris Strausser	Assistant head coach Offensive line	0	California State University, Chico (1989)
Ron Collins	Defensive coordinator	0	Washington State University (1987)
Mark Helfrich	Offensive coordinator Quarterbacks	0	Southern Oregon University (1996)
Eric Kiesau	Passing game coordinator Receivers	0	Portland State University (1996)
Romeo Bandison	Defensive line	0	University of Oregon (1994)
Greg Brown	Secondary	3 (1991–93)	University of Texas at El Paso (1980)
Brian Cabral	Linebackers	17	University of Colorado at Boulder (1978)
Darian Hagan	Running backs	1	University of Colorado at Boulder (1991)
Kent Riddle	Tight ends Special teams	0	Oregon State University (1991)

=== Roster ===
(as of November 20, 2006)
Wide receiver: 1 Stephone Robinson – junior; 4 Patrick Williams – sophomore; 9 Blake Mackey – (redshirt) senior; 17 Alvin Barnett – junior; 48 Cody Crawford – sophomore; 80 Jarrell Yates – (redshirt) freshman; 83 Dusty Sprague – junior; 85 Nick Holz – (redshirt) senior; Offensive line: 57 Bryce MacMartin – senior; 58 Mark Fenton – (redshirt) senior; 60 Paul Backowski – (redshirt) freshman; 63 Jack Tipton – senior; 66^{C} Brian Daniels – senior; 68 Jeremy Hauck – (redshirt) freshman; 72 Devin Head – (redshirt) freshman; 75 Daniel Sanders – sophomore; 76 Edwin Harrison – junior; 77 Tyler Polumbus – junior; Tight end: 30 Paul Creighton – (redshirt) senior; 46 Dan Goettsch – (redshirt) senior; 84 Tyson DeVree – junior; 87 Riar Geer – (redshirt) freshman; Quarterbacks: 5 Patrick Devenny – (redshirt) freshman; 7 Bernard Jackson – junior	Tailbacks: 2 Hugh Charles – junior; 23 Kevin Moyd – (redshirt) freshman; 27 Byron Ellis – junior; 37 Mell Holliday – (redshirt) senior; Fullbacks: 32 Maurice Cantrell – sophomore; 41 Jake Behrens – (redshirt) freshman; 43 Samson Jagoras – junior; Defensive line: 33 Walter Boye-Doe – senior; 47 Alonzo Barrett – junior; 51 Alex Ligon – (redshirt) senior; 53 Abraham Wright – (redshirt) senior; 78 Jason Brace – freshman; 86 George Hypolite – sophomore; 91 Maurice Lucas – sophomore; 94 Brandon Nicolas – sophomore; 96 Marcus Jones – (redshirt) senior; 97 Taj Kaynor – (redshirt) freshman; Linebackers: 13 Joe Sanders – junior; 19 Ben Carpenter – (redshirt) senior; 34 R.J. Brown – sophomore; 40 Brad Jones – sophomore; 44 Jordon Dizon – junior; 45 Jeff Smart – (redshirt) freshman; 49^{C} Thaddaeus Washington – (redshirt) senior; 54 Marcus Burton – sophomore; 55 Jason Ackermann – (redshirt) senior; 56 Chad Cusworth – (redshirt) senior; 98 Michael Sipili – freshman	Defensive backs: 5 J.J. Billingsley – (redshirt) senior; 6 Gardner McKay – sophomore; 10 Terry Washington – senior; 15 Ryan Walters – sophomore; 20 Terry Wilson – sophomore; 22 Lorenzo Sims Jr. – senior; 25 Lionel Harris – junior; 69 Vito Lucero – junior; 26 Terrence Wheatley – junior; 29 Cha'pelle Brown – freshman; 30 Joel Adams – sophomore; 36 Reggie Foster – (redshirt) freshman; 42 Benjamin Burney – sophomore; Punters: 14 Matt DiLallo – (redshirt) freshman; 16 Mason Crosby – senior; 90 Isaac Garden – junior; Kickers: 16^{C} Mason Crosby – senior; 39 Kevin Eberhart – junior; 90 Isaac Garden – junior; Injured: 10 (QB)‡ James Cox – senior (thumb); 13 (WR)‡ Michael Kachmer – (redshirt) freshman (knee); 18 (S)‡ Dominique Brooks – senior (knee); 21 (DB)‡ Vance Washington – (redshirt) senior (knee); 73 (OL)‡ Erick Faatagi – junior (knee); 88 (TE)‡ Devin Shanahan – (redshirt) freshman (knee)
^{C} = Captain ‡ = Out for season

In addition there can be as many as 60 players not in the depth chart/practice squad.

== Awards and honors ==
- Brian Daniels (OL) Senior
  - Vincent Draddy Award Finalist
  - Academic All-Big 12 Team, First team
- Mason Crosby (K) Senior
  - Walter Camp All-American, All-Big 12 Conference
- Benjamin Burney (S) Sophomore
  - Academic All-Big 12 Team, First team
- Ben Carpenter (LB) Senior
  - Academic All-Big 12 Team, First team
- Byron Ellis (TB) Junior
  - Academic All-Big 12 Team, First team
- Dusty Sprague (WR) Junior
  - Academic All-Big 12 Team, First team

== Statistics ==
=== Team ===
	CU	Opp
Scoring	196	267
Points per Game	16.3	22.3
First downs	183	222
Rushing	100	73
Passing	74	134
Penalty	9	15
Total Offense	3557	4091
Avg. per play	5.0	5.1
Avg. per game	296.4	340.9
Fumbles-Lost	26–8	18–12
Penalties–yards	63–559	84–674
Avg. per game	46.6	56.2

	CU	Opp
Punts–yards	56-2353	50-2040
Avg per Punt	42.0	40.8
Time of Possession/Game	29:01	30:39
3rd down conversions	54/159 (34.0%)	85/178 (47.8%)
4th down conversions	2/13	9/17
Touchdowns Scored	19	32
Field goals–attempts	19–28	10–14
PAT–attempts	19–19	31–31
Attendance	276,286	425,827
Games/avg. per game	6/46,048	6/70,971*

* – Includes game at neutral site Invesco Field in Denver, CO where Colorado State was the home team.

==== Scores by quarter ====
	1	2	3	4	OT	2OT	3OT	Total
Opponents	55	58	31	106	7	7	3	267
Buffaloes	53	49	40	40	7	7	0	196

=== Offense ===
==== Rushing ====
Name	Att	Gain	Loss	Net	TD	Long	Avg
Charles, Hugh	139	800	21	779	1	44	5.6
Jackson, Bernard	154	883	207	676	7	62	4.4
Holliday, Mell	105	526	13	512	2	52	4.9
Ellis, Byron	38	133	7	126	1	11	3.3
Williams, Patrick	7	31	9	22	0	14	3.1
Sprague, Dusty	1	11	0	11	0	11	11.0
Barnett, Alvin	1	0	2	−2	0	0	−2.0
TEAM	2	0	5	−5	0	0	−2.5
Cox, James	10	18	30	−12	1	9	−1.2
Robinson, Stephone	3	6	19	−13	0	6	−4.3
DiLallo, Matthew	1	0	20	−20	0	0	−20.0
Total	461	2408	333	2074	12	62	4.5

==== Passing ====
Name	Att-Cmp-Int	Pct	Yds	TD	Lng	Avg
Jackson, Bernard	220–109–7	49.5%	1359	7	63	12.5
Cox, James	30–11–0	36.7%	124	0	42	11.3
Charles, Hugh	1–0–0	0%	0	0	0	0
Geer, Riar	1–0–1	0%	0	0	0	0
Team	1–0–0	0%	0	0	0	0
Total	253–120–8	47.4%	1483	7	63	12.4

==== Receiving ====
Name	No.	Yds	TD	Long	Avg
Williams, Patrick	20	303	1	61	15.2
Geer, Riar	24	261	3	28	10.9
Barnett, Alvin	21	232	1	38	11.0
Crawford, Cody	15	222	0	23	14.8
Sprague, Dusty	11	179	0	63	16.3
Charles, Hugh	9	85	0	33	9.4
Cantrell, Maurice	2	38	0	20	19.0
DeVree, Tyson	4	36	1	6	9.0
Holz, Nick	3	29	0	9	9.7
Yates, Jarrell	1	29	1	29	29.0
Goettsch, Dan	3	28	0	17	9.3
Ellis, Byron	2	13	0	7	6.5
Robinson, Stephone	2	1	0	1	0.5
Total	117	1456	7	63	12.4

=== Defense ===
Name	Tackles					Fumbles			Interceptions				Sacks		QB Hurry
Name	Solo	Ast	Total	TFL	TFL Yds	Forced	Recovery	Yds	No.	Yds	BreakUp	Blocked Kick	No.	Yards	QB Hurry
Dizon, Jordon	63	58.0	79.5	11	42	1	2	0	0	0	0	0	5	31	2
Washington, Thaddeus	42	42.0	63	5.5	16	2	1	10	1	4	3	0	1	3	1
Jones, Brad	30	36	44.5	1	2	0	0	0	1	10	1	0	0.5	0	1
Wheatley, Terrence	36	15	43.5	4	10	1	2	0	5	26	7	0	2	5	0
Walters, Ryan	34	18.0	43	1	3	0	1	95	2	−2	2	0	0	0	0
Washington, Terrence	33	15.0	40.5	2.5	5	1	0	0	0	0	2	0	0	0	0
Harris, Lionel	31	17.0	39.5	1	3	2	1	0	1	2	3	0	0	0	0
Hypolite, George	23	24.0	35	8.5	34	1	2	0	0	0	2	0	2.5	17	2
Nicolas, Brandon	23	31.0	33.5	2.5	5	2	0	0	0	0	0	0	0	0	2
Wright, Abraham	24	18	33	13.5	98	1	0	0	0	0	2	0	10.5	88	2
Boye-Doe, Walter	20	22	31	5	18	2	0	0	0	0	2	0	2	10	4
Brown, Cha'pelle	18	19	27.5	1	2	0	0	0	1	0	1	0	0	0	0
Sims, Lorenzo	21	6.0	24	0	0	0	0	0	0	0	2	0	0	0	0
Billingsley, JJ	19	13.0	23.5	1	1	0	1	0	0	0	2	0	0	0	0
Sipili, Michael	14	10.0	19	1	1	0	0	0	0	0	1	0	0	0	1
Burney, Benjamin	14	4.0	16	0.5	1	0	0	0	0	0	0	0	0	0	0
Lucas, Maurice	3	10.0	8	0	0	0	0	0	0	0	0	0	0	0	2
Ligon, Alex	5	4.0	7	2	13	0	0	0	0	0	0	0	1	8	0
Barrett, Alonzo	4	5.0	6.5	1.5	4	0	0	0	0	0	0	0	0	0	0
Sanders, Joe	5	2.0	6	0	0	0	0	0	0	0	0	0	0	0	0
Burton, Marcus	4	2.0	5	0	0	1	0	0	0	0	0	0	0	0	0
McCay, Gardner	4	2.0	5	0	0	0	0	0	0	0	0	0	0	0	0
Brown, RJ	4	1.0	4.5	0	0	0	1	0	0	0	0	0	0	0	0
Carpenter, Ben	4	0.0	4	0	0	0	0	0	0	0	0	0	0	0	0
Moyd, Kevin	3	0.0	3	1	1	0	0	0	0	0	0	0	0	0	0
Brace, Jason	2	0.0	2	1	3	0	0	0	0	0	0	0	0	0	0
Adams, Joel	2	0.0	2	0	0	0	0	0	0	0	0	0	0	0	0
Cantrell, Maurice	2	0.0	2	0	0	0	0	0	0	0	0	0	0	0	0
Cusworth, Chad	2	0.0	2	0	0	0	0	0	0	0	0	0	0	0	0
Jackson, Bernard	2	0.0	2	0	0	0	0	0	0	0	0	0	0	0	0
Drescher, Justin	1	1.0	1.5	0	0	0	0	0	0	0	0	0	0	0	0
Charles, Hugh	1	0.0	1	0	0	0	0	0	0	0	0	0	0	0	0
DiLallo, Matthew	1	0.0	1	0	0	0	0	0	0	0	0	0	0	0	0
Polumbus, Tyler	1	0.0	1	0	0	0	0	0	0	0	0	0	0	0	0
Brooks, Dominique	0	1.0	0.5	0	0	0	0	0	0	0	0	0	0	0	0
Barnett, Alvin	0	0.0	0	0	0	1	1	9	0	0	0	0	0	0	0
Kaynor, Taj	0	0.0	0	0	0	0	0	0	0	0	1	0	0	0	0
Total	495	376	660	64.5	262	15	12	114	11	40	31	0	24.5	162	17

=== Special teams ===
Name	Punting						Kickoffs					Scoring / Field Goals										
Name	No.	Yds	Avg	Long	I20	TB	No.	Yds	TB	OB	Avg	PAT	10–19	20–29	30–39	40–49	50–59	60+	FG-FGA	Pct.	Long	Points
DiLallo, Matthew	47	2056	43.7	73	13	0																
Crosby, Mason	1	43	43.0	43	0	0	47	2976	28	1	63.3	19–19	0–0	5–6	7–8	5–5	2–6	0–3	19–27	67.9%	56	76
Garden, Isaac	6	216	36.0	41	1	0	1	−20	0	1	−20.0											
TEAM	1	26	26.0	26	0	0																
Total	54	2315	42.9	73	14	0	48	2956	28	2	21.7	19–19	0–0	5–6	7–8	5–5	2–6	0–3	19–27	67.9%	56	76

=== Returns ===
Name	Punt returns			Kick returns			Interception Return		
Name	No.	Yds	Long	No.	Yds	Long	No.	Yds	Long
Robinson, Stephone	15	76	36	14	248	26	0	0	0
Wheatley, Terrence	0	0	0	1	17	17	5	26	15
Washington, Thad	0	0	0	1	21	21	1	4	4
Williams, Patrick	0	0	0	1	13	13	0	0	0
Brown, Cha'pelle	1	1	0	0	0	0	0	0	0
Billingsley, JJ	0	0	0	0	0	0	1	0	0
Walters, Ryan	0	0	0	0	0	0	2	−2	0
Washington, Terrence	0	5	5	10	194	25	0	0	0
Harris, Lionel	0	0	0	0	0	0	1	2	2
McBride, Chase	6	41	20	0	0	0	0	0	0
Ellis, Byron	0	0	0	2	43	29	0	0	0
Charles, Hugh	0	0	0	3	47	18	0	0	0
Jones, Brad	0	0	0	0	0	0	1	10	10
Total	22	123	36	30	549	29	12	40	15
