= 2007 Colorado Buffaloes football team =

American college football season

2007 Colorado Buffaloes football

Independence Bowl, L 24–30 vs. Alabama
- Conference: Big 12 Conference
- North
- Record: 6–7 (4–4 Big 12)
- Head coach: Dan Hawkins (2nd season)
- Offensive coordinator: Mark Helfrich (2nd season)
- Offensive scheme: Multiple
- Defensive coordinator: Ron Collins (2nd season)
- Base defense: 4–3 Cover 2
- Home stadium: Folsom Field

Uniform

2007 Big 12 Conference football standings
	Conf.			Overall
Team	W		L	W		L
North Division
No. 4 Missouri xy	7	–	1	12	–	2
No. 7 Kansas x%	7	–	1	12	–	1
Colorado	4	–	4	6	–	7
Kansas State	3	–	5	5	–	7
Nebraska	2	–	6	5	–	7
Iowa State	2	–	6	3	–	9
South Division
No. 8 Oklahoma xy$	6	–	2	11	–	3
No. 10 Texas	5	–	3	10	–	3
No. 22 Texas Tech	4	–	4	9	–	4
Oklahoma State	4	–	4	7	–	6
Texas A&M	4	–	4	7	–	6
Baylor	0	–	8	3	–	9
Championship: Oklahoma 38, Missouri 17
$ – BCS representative as conference champion; % – BCS at-large representative; x – Division champion/co-champions; y – Championship game participant; Rankings from AP Poll

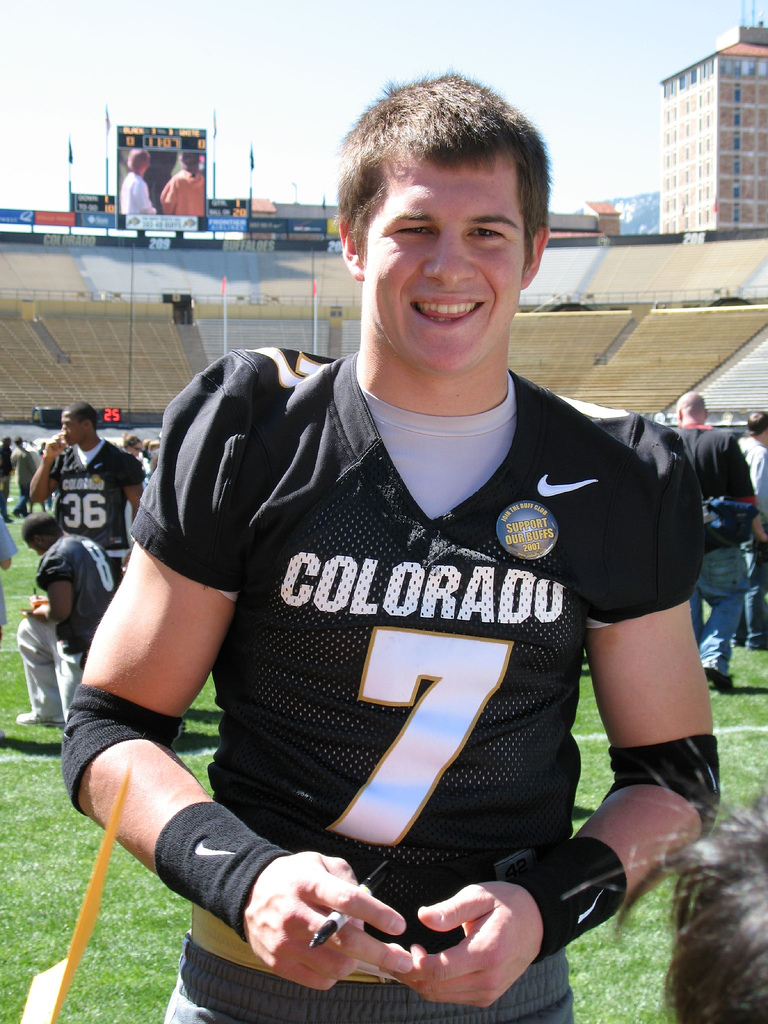
Cody Hawkins before the spring game on April 14, 2007

The 2007 Colorado Buffaloes football team represented the University of Colorado at Boulder in the 2007 NCAA Division I FBS football season. The team was coached by Dan Hawkins in his second season at Colorado and played their home games at Folsom Field. Colorado finished 6–7 after losing in the Independence Bowl to Alabama. 2007 was Colorado's first consecutive losing season in 22 years, but represented a vast improvement over the team's 2–10 mark in 2006. This was the last Colorado team to be invited to a bowl game until 2016.

== Preseason ==
=== Spring practice ===
Official CU Spring Game website

Prior to spring practice, there were two position changes planned: Cha’pelle Brown will move from cornerback to wide receiver, and Joe Sanders will switch back to tight end from outside linebacker. Sanders started his career at tight end but two weeks into his first spring practice moved to inside linebacker (he missed the fall of his freshman year after undergoing shoulder surgery).

Nine players will not return from the 2006 squad: Paul Backowski (OL), Quinton Borders (OL), Dominique Brooks (S), Clayton Cammon (WR, walkon), Steve Fendry (TE), Isaac Garden (P/PK, walkon, graduated), Tom Grubin (C, walkon), Jeremy Hauck (OL) and Reggie Joseph (WR).

The annual spring game occurred on April 14. The game consisted of a mix between live scrimmages and 7-on-7 drills due to the shortage of healthy and eligible offensive linemen. The offense was remarked as having made improvements compared to last season's spring game.

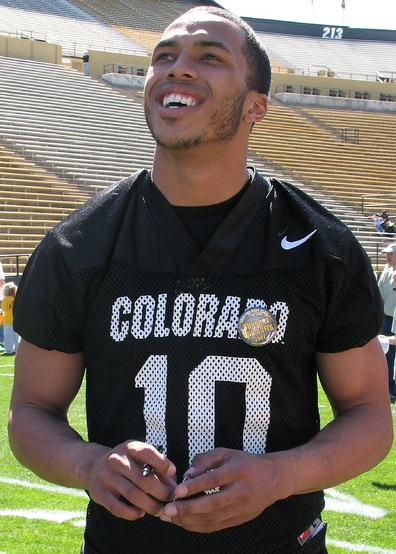
Bernard Jackson before the spring game

Bernard Jackson, the starting quarterback from last season saw limited time at the position during spring practice and was used as a wide receiver, running back, punt and kick returner. Cody Hawkins (Red shirt Freshman) and Nick Nelson (JC transfer Junior) competed for the quarterback position. Hawkins completed 12-of-20 passes for 119 yards an interception and a touchdown in live action. In 7-on-7 drills, he completed 15-of-23 passes for 182 yards and two touchdowns. Nelson completed 3-of-10 passes for 30 yards and an interception and also had two rushes for 20 yards during live action. In 7-on-7 drills, he completed 21-of-28 passes for 256 yards with two touchdowns and an interception.

==== Awards ====
- Jordon Dizon
  - Lott Trophy watchlist
- Daniel Sanders
  - Dave Rimington Trophy watchlist
- Terrence Wheatley
  - Jim Thorpe Award watchlist

=== Infraction ===
In June 2007, the Buffaloes were placed under probation for two years and fined US$100,000 for undercharging 133 student-athletes for meals over a six-year span (2000–01 to 2005–06) resulting in the major infraction. The football program, with 86 of the 133 student-athletes involved, also lost one scholarship for the next three seasons.

=== Recruiting ===
National Signing Day was on February 7, 2007, and Colorado signed high school athletes from around the country. Colorado's overall team ranking was 35th by Scout.com and 31st by Rivals.com. Colorado had 31 scholarships available.

Official CU Signing Day Central

College recruiting (2007)
Name	Hometown	School	Height	Weight	40^{‡}	Commit date
Ethan Adkins; OL/OG	Castle Rock, CO	Douglas County HS	6 ft 4 in (1.93 m)	265 lb (120 kg)	5.30	
Ethan Adkins; OL/OG	Recruit ratings: Scout: Rivals: (70)					
Tyler Ahles; LB/SLB	San Bernardino, CA	Cajon HS	6 ft 2 in (1.88 m)	225 lb (102 kg)	4.70	
Tyler Ahles; LB/SLB	Recruit ratings: Scout: Rivals: (40)					
Matt Bahr; OL/OT	Mission Viejo, CA	Mission Viejo HS	6 ft 4 in (1.93 m)	270 lb (120 kg)	5.10	
Matt Bahr; OL/OT	Recruit ratings: Scout: Rivals: (75)					
Matthew Ballenger; QB	Nampa, ID	Skyview HS	6 ft 4 in (1.93 m)	200 lb (91 kg)	4.9	
Matthew Ballenger; QB	Recruit ratings: Scout: Rivals: (70)					
Blake Behrens; OL/OG	Phoenix, AZ	Brophy Prep	6 ft 4 in (1.93 m)	280 lb (130 kg)	5.30	
Blake Behrens; OL/OG	Recruit ratings: Scout: Rivals: (73)					
Kendrick Celestine; WR	Mamou, LA	Mamou HS	5 ft 11 in (1.80 m)	173 lb (78 kg)	4.4	
Kendrick Celestine; WR	Recruit ratings: Scout: Rivals: (78)					
Shawn Daniels; OL/OG	Denver, CO	Mullen HS	6 ft 4 in (1.93 m)	270 lb (120 kg)	5.41	
Shawn Daniels; OL/OG	Recruit ratings: Scout: Rivals: (73)					
Patrick Gates; RB	Mission Viejo, CA	Saddleback JC	5 ft 11 in (1.80 m)	195 lb (88 kg)	4.45	
Patrick Gates; RB	Recruit ratings: Scout: Rivals: (JC)					
Eugene Goree; DT	Murfreesboro, TN	Riverdale HS	6 ft 4 in (1.93 m)	281 lb (127 kg)	4.9	
Eugene Goree; DT	Recruit ratings: Scout: Rivals: (69)					
Josh Hartigan; OLB/MLB	Oakland Park, FL	Northeast HS	6 ft 1 in (1.85 m)	195 lb (88 kg)	4.6	^{2006}
Josh Hartigan; OLB/MLB	Recruit ratings: Scout: Rivals: (40)					
Johnathan Hawkins; CB	Perris, CA	Ranch Verde HS	5 ft 10 in (1.78 m)	185 lb (84 kg)	–	
Johnathan Hawkins; CB	Recruit ratings: (40)					
Drew Hudgins; DE	Highland, KS	Highland Community College	6 ft 5 in (1.96 m)	240 lb (110 kg)	4.9	^{2006}
Drew Hudgins; DE	Recruit ratings: Scout: Rivals: (JC)					
Mike Iltis; OL/OG	Riverview, Hillsborough County, Florida	Riverview HS	6 ft 3 in (1.91 m)	288 lb (131 kg)	5.01	
Mike Iltis; OL/OG	Recruit ratings: Scout: Rivals: (73)					
Devan Johnson; RB/FB	Pittsburgh, PA	Woodland Hills HS	6 ft 1 in (1.85 m)	232 lb (105 kg)	4.55	
Devan Johnson; RB/FB	Recruit ratings: Scout: Rivals: (76)					
Brian Lockridge; RB	Mission Viejo, CA	Mission Viejo HS	5 ft 7 in (1.70 m)	175 lb (79 kg)	4.43	
Brian Lockridge; RB	Recruit ratings: Scout: Rivals: (71)					
Kealaka'i Maiava; OL/C	Wailuku, HI	Baldwin HS	6 ft 0 in (1.83 m)	278 lb (126 kg)	5.0	
Kealaka'i Maiava; OL/C	Recruit ratings: Scout: Rivals: (69)					
Ryan Miller; OL/OT	Littleton, CO	Columbine HS	6 ft 8 in (2.03 m)	280 lb (130 kg)	5.10	
Ryan Miller; OL/OT	Recruit ratings: Scout: Rivals: (81)					
Nick Nelson; QB	Mission Viejo, CA	Saddleback JC	6 ft 2 in (1.88 m)	215 lb (98 kg)	4.8	^{2006}
Nick Nelson; QB	Recruit ratings: Scout: Rivals: (JC)					
Conrad Obi; DE	Loganville, GA	Grayson HS	6 ft 4 in (1.93 m)	240 lb (110 kg)	4.75	
Conrad Obi; DE	Recruit ratings: Scout: Rivals: (79)					
Anthony Perkins; CB	Northglenn, CO	Northglenn HS	5 ft 11 in (1.80 m)	180 lb (82 kg)	4.50	
Anthony Perkins; CB	Recruit ratings: Scout: Rivals: (66)					
Chris Perri; DT/DE	Oakland, CA	Laney JC	6 ft 4 in (1.93 m)	265 lb (120 kg)	4.7	
Chris Perri; DT/DE	Recruit ratings: Scout: Rivals: (JC)					
Lagrone Shields; DE	Memphis, TN	Ridgeway HS	6 ft 2 in (1.88 m)	238 lb (108 kg)	4.7	
Lagrone Shields; DE	Recruit ratings: Scout: Rivals: (73)					
Markques Simas; WR	San Diego, CA	Mira Mesa Senior HS	6 ft 1 in (1.85 m)	198 lb (90 kg)	4.55	
Markques Simas; WR	Recruit ratings: Scout: Rivals: (74)					
Josh Smith; ATH/WR	Moorpark, CA	Moorpark HS	6 ft 2 in (1.88 m)	175 lb (79 kg)	4.5	
Josh Smith; ATH/WR	Recruit ratings: Scout: Rivals: (40)					
Lamont Smith; DB/CB	Pittsburgh, PA	Central Catholic HS	5 ft 9 in (1.75 m)	150 lb (68 kg)	4.42	
Lamont Smith; DB/CB	Recruit ratings: Scout: Rivals: (76)					
Sione Tau; OT	Honolulu, HI	Damien Memorial HS	6 ft 6 in (1.98 m)	285 lb (129 kg)	4.90	
Sione Tau; OT	Recruit ratings: Scout: Rivals: (74)					
Nathan Vaiomounga; LB/S	Corona, CA	Corona HS	5 ft 10 in (1.78 m)	190 lb (86 kg)	4.53	
Nathan Vaiomounga; LB/S	Recruit ratings: Scout: Rivals: (40)					
Anthony Wright; S	Compton, CA	Compton HS	6 ft 1 in (1.85 m)	185 lb (84 kg)	4.54	
Anthony Wright; S	Recruit ratings: Scout: Rivals: (77)					
^{2006} = counts towards 2006 class
Jess Beets (OL, 6–3, 280) from Mission Viejo, CA (Saddleback JC) had given a verbal commitment but picked Kentucky over Colorado.; Apaiata Tuihalamaka (LB, 6–3, 205) from Gardena, CA (Junipero Serra HS) had given a verbal commitment to Colorado on November 15, 2006, but later retracted and gave a verbal commitment to the Arizona Wildcats on December 1, 2006.; Devonne Quattlebaum (S, 6–0, 175) from Monetta, SC (Ridge-Spring Monetta HS) had given a verbal commitment to Colorado in November. But he took another recruiting visit to South Carolina State University in late January and gave a "solid verbal" to them afterwards.; Adam Tello (OL, 6–4, 290) from Norco, CA (Norco HS) had verbally committed to Colorado but later retracted giving a commitment to Arizona State on February 6, 2007.; Garth Gerhart (OL, 6–2, 300) from Norco, CA (Norco HS) had verbally committed to Colorado but gave a verbal commitment to Arizona State on February 6, 2007.; Robert Hall (LB, 6–2, 220) from Friendswood, TX (Friendswood HS) was reported as committing to Colorado but did not sign.
Overall recruit ranking: Scout: 35 Rivals: 31
‡ Refers to 40-yard dash; Note: In many cases, Scout, Rivals, 247Sports, On3, and ESPN may conflict in their listings of height, weight and 40 time.; In these cases, the average was taken. ESPN grades are on a 100-point scale.; Sources: "Colorado 2007 Football Commitments". Rivals.; "2007 Colorado Recruits". Scout.; "2007 Colorado". ESPN.; "Scout.com Team Recruiting Rankings". Scout.; "2007 Team Ranking". Rivals.com.

=== Uniform changes ===
Images of new uniforms

On June 2, 2007, Colorado announced changes to their uniforms. Most notable is the incorporation of silver into the uniform combining the two school colors, silver and gold, for the first time. The "COLORADO" across the chest and player names on the back are now smaller, and will be gold instead of white (the only color it has ever been). The numbers will now be silver. The pants now have trim on the sides; silver on the gold pants and gold on the black pants. The white pants have now been eliminated. In addition to the design change, the new uniforms designed by Nike also improve technical parts of the uniform including innovative fit, weight reduction, increased ventilation and improved moisture management.

== Schedule ==
The schedule was ranked as the No. 10 toughest home schedule.

Date	Time	Opponent	Site	TV	Result	Attendance
September 1	10:00 am	vs. Colorado State*	Invesco Field at Mile High; Denver, CO (Rocky Mountain Showdown)	FSN	W 31–28 ^{OT}	68,133
September 8	8:15 pm	at Arizona State*	Sun Devil Stadium; Tempe, AZ	FSN	L 14–33	58,417
September 15	8:00 pm	Florida State*	Folsom Field; Boulder, CO	ESPN	L 6–16	52,951
September 22	1:30 pm	Miami (OH)*	Folsom Field; Boulder, CO		W 42–0	45,243
September 29	11:30 am	No. 3 Oklahoma^{†}	Folsom Field; Boulder, CO	FSN	W 27–24	50,031
October 6	5:00 pm	at Baylor	Floyd Casey Stadium; Waco, TX		W 43–23	32,376
October 13	7:15 pm	at Kansas State	Bill Snyder Family Football Stadium; Manhattan, KS (rivalry)	ESPN2	L 20–47	46,637
October 20	3:45 pm	No. 15 Kansas	Folsom Field; Boulder, CO	ESPN	L 14–19	51,940
October 27	10:00 am	at Texas Tech	Jones AT&T Stadium; Lubbock, TX	ABC	W 31–26	49,084
November 3	4:30 pm	No. 9 Missouri	Folsom Field; Boulder, CO	FSN	L 10–55	51,483
November 10	10:30 am	at Iowa State	Jack Trice Stadium; Ames, IA	FCS	L 28–31	45,487
November 23	10:00 am	Nebraska	Folsom Field; Boulder, CO (rivalry)	ABC	W 65–51	51,403
December 30	6:00 pm	vs. Alabama*	Independence Stadium; Shreveport, LA (Independence Bowl)	ESPN	L 24–30	47,043
*Non-conference game; ^{†}Homecoming; Rankings from Coaches' Poll released prior to the game; All times are in Mountain time

== Roster ==
Michael Sipili was charged with assault for being suspected for fighting with Taj Kaynor, defensive tackle, also involving Chris Perri, sophomore defensive tackle on June 22, 2007. Sipili and Perri were suspended for the first three games and Kaynor was suspended for the first game. Sipili was later suspended from campus on September 21, 2007, for the fall semester over the incident forcing him to miss the entire season. As a true sophomore, he will likely use this season as a redshirt and have 3 years remaining of eligibility.

Starting running back Hugh Charles suffered a pulled hamstring on the first series of the Colorado State game, forcing him to miss the rest of that game and the Arizona State game the following week.

	(as of October 22, 2007)
Wide receiver (x): 4 Patrick Williams – Junior; 9 Josh Smith – Freshman; 48 Cody Crawford – Junior; 80 Jarrell Yates – (redshirt) Sophomore; Wide receiver (z): 21 Scotty McKnight – (redshirt) Freshman; 83 Dusty Sprague – (redshirt) Senior; 1 Stephone Robinson – (redshirt) Senior; 5 Kendrick Celestine – Freshman; Offensive line Left tackle: 77 Tyler Polumbus – (redshirt) Senior; 73 Ryan Miller – Freshman; 79 Sione Tau – Freshman; 71 Matthew Bahr – Freshman; 63 Ethan Adkins – Freshman; Left guard: 51 Kai Maiava – Freshman; 65 Wes Palazzi – (redshirt) Freshman; Center: 75 Daniel Sanders – Junior; 51 Kai Maiava – Freshman; 56 Keenan Stevens – (redshirt) Freshman; Right guard: 76 Edwin Harrison – Senior; 72 Devin Head – (redshirt) Sophomore; 51 Kai Maiava – Freshman; Right tackle: 73 Ryan Miller – Freshman; 76 Edwin Harrison – Senior; Tight end (numerical order): 87 Riar Geer – (redshirt) Sophomore; 84 Tyson DeVree – (redshirt) Senior; 13 Joe Sanders – (redshirt) Senior; 92 Nate Solder – (redshirt) Freshman; 33 Patrick Devenny – Sophomore; Quarterbacks: 7 Cody Hawkins – (redshirt) Freshman; 3 Nick Nelson – Junior; Tailbacks (numerical order): 2 Hugh Charles – Senior; 8 Demetrius Sumler – (redshirt) Freshman; 27 Byron Ellis – Senior; 20 Brian Lockridge – Freshman; 23 Kevin Moyd – (redshirt) Sophomore; Fullbacks: 41 Jake Behrens – (redshirt) Sophomore; 43 Samson Jagoras – Senior; 32 Maurice Cantrell – Junior	Defensive line Left Defensive end: 91 Maurice Lucas – Junior; 90 Marquez Herrod – (redshirt) Freshman; Defensive tackle: 86 George Hypolite – Junior; 78 Jason Brace – Sophomore; 69 Eric Lawson – (redshirt) Sophomore; Nose tackle: 94 Brandon Nicolas – Junior; 99 Chris Perri – Junior; 97 Taj Kaynor – (redshirt) Sophomore; Right Defensive end: 47 Alonzo Barrett – (redshirt) Senior; 99 Chris Perri – Junior; Linebackers Mike (Inside) Linebacker: 45 Jeff Smart – (redshirt) Sophomore; 57 Jake Duren – Sophomore; Will (Inside) Linebacker: 44^{C} Jordon Dizon – Senior; 52 Brian Stengel – Sophomore; Sam (Outside) Linebacker: 40 Brad Jones – Junior; 59 B.J. Beatty – (redshirt) Freshman; 35 Nate Vaiomonuga – Freshman; Defensive backs Left cornerback: 26 Terrence Wheatley – (redshirt) Senior; 6 Gardner McKay – Junior; 3 Jimmy Smith – (redshirt) Freshman; Free safety: 15 Ryan Walters – Junior; 23 Jalil Brown – (redshirt) Freshman; Strong safety: 9 Daniel Dykes – Junior; 25 Lionel Harris – Senior; 30 Joel Adams – Junior; Right cornerback: 42 Benjamin Burney – Junior; 29 Cha'pelle Brown – Sophomore	Punters: 14 Matt DiLallo – (redshirt) Freshman; 95 Tom Suazo – Junior; 39 Kevin Eberhart – (redshirt) Senior; Kickers: 39 Kevin Eberhart – (redshirt) Senior (FG); 89 Tyler Cope – Freshman (KO); Out/Injured: 10^{C} Bernard Jackson – (redshirt) Senior (Academics); 34^{C}‡ R.J. Brown – Junior (Head); 54 ‡ Marcus Burton – Junior (academics); 61 Erick Faatagi – Junior (academics); 86 ‡ Cameron Ham – (redshirt) Freshman (leg); 49 ‡ Drew Hudgins – Junior (Achilles); 98 ‡ Michael Sipili – Sophomore (Suspended)^{C} = Captain ‡ = Out for season (SUSP) = Suspended for game(s) Positions listed by (numerical order) mean no preference by the coaching staff who is a starter and/or playing time Tight ends and tailbacks

== Coaching staff ==
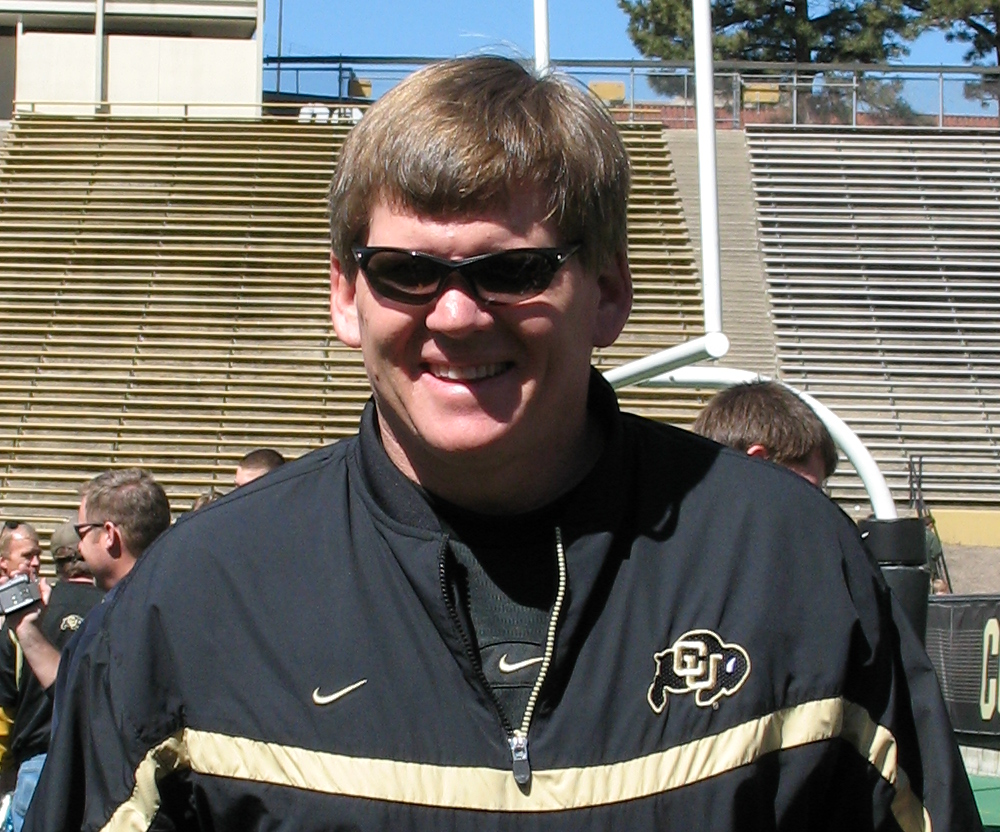
Dan Hawkins

Name	Position	Years at CU	Alma mater (year)
Dan Hawkins	Head coach	1	University of California, Davis (1984)
Ron Collins	Defensive coordinator	1	Washington State University (1987)
Mark Helfrich	Offensive coordinator Quarterbacks	1	Southern Oregon University (1996)
Jeff Grimes	Offensive line	0	University of Texas at El Paso (1991)
Eric Kiesau	Passing game coordinator Receivers	1	Portland State University (1996)
Romeo Bandison	Defensive line	1	University of Oregon (1994)
Greg Brown	Secondary	4 (1991–93)	University of Texas at El Paso (1980)
Brian Cabral	Linebackers	18	University of Colorado at Boulder (1978)
Darian Hagan	Running backs	2	University of Colorado at Boulder (1991)
Kent Riddle	Tight ends Special teams	1	Oregon State University (1991)
Mark Nolan	Recruiting coordinator	1	Willamette University (1995)
Jashon Sykes	Recruiting coordinator	1	University of Colorado at Boulder (2002)

== Game summaries ==
=== Colorado State ===
	1	2	3	4	OT	Total
Rams	7	7	14	0	0	28
Buffaloes	14	3	8	3	3	31

The 2007 Qwest Rocky Mountain Showdown was back in Invesco Field at Mile High in Denver, CO with the kickoff at 10:10 am MDT. Both the Colorado Buffaloes and Colorado State Rams were coming off losing seasons. Colorado State won last season's game and the series was tied at 4–4 over the last 8 games coming into the game. Colorado State returned running back Kyle Bell who missed last season due to an injury. Colorado started quarterback Cody Hawkins, head coach Dan Hawkins' son and a redshirt freshman in his first start at the college level.

Colorado had been favored entering the game. This was Colorado's 200th game against current members of the Mountain West Conference, with a 137–55–7 record. Colorado was 73–39–5 in their 117-season openers and had won five of its last eight season openers entering the game. Colorado was 8–5, prior to the game, against intrastate rival Colorado State when the Rams have been the opposition in the season opener.

The game was not sold out, with the low sales possibly due to the losing records of both teams last season. There were about 9,000 tickets still available a week before the game. Invesco Field has a capacity of 76,125. A crowd of 68,133 ultimately attended the game.

Colorado made a come from behind victory to force overtime and then win the game. The game started with the first three series scoring touchdowns. Cody Hawkins completed 18 of 31 passes for 201 yards, two touchdowns and one interception. Colorado State's Kyle Bell rushed for a career-high 40 times for 135 yards and a touchdown. Colorado State's quarterback, Hanie went 20-of-27 and threw three touchdown passes to tight end Kory Sperry and one interception, in overtime.

Colorado State won the coin toss in overtime and elected to go first. Terrence Wheatley made an interception to end the Rams' OT side. Kevin Eberhart, senior place kicker, had a good game going 3 for 4 with a career long 38-yard field goal before halftime, a 22-yard field goal with 13 seconds left to send the game into overtime and the game winning 35-yard kick in overtime.

Colorado lost their starting running back, Hugh Charles early in the first quarter with a pulled hamstring. The backup, Demetrius Sumler rushed 16 times for 85-yards.

External link: https://web.archive.org/web/20070827084821/http://www.qwestrockymountainshowdown.com/

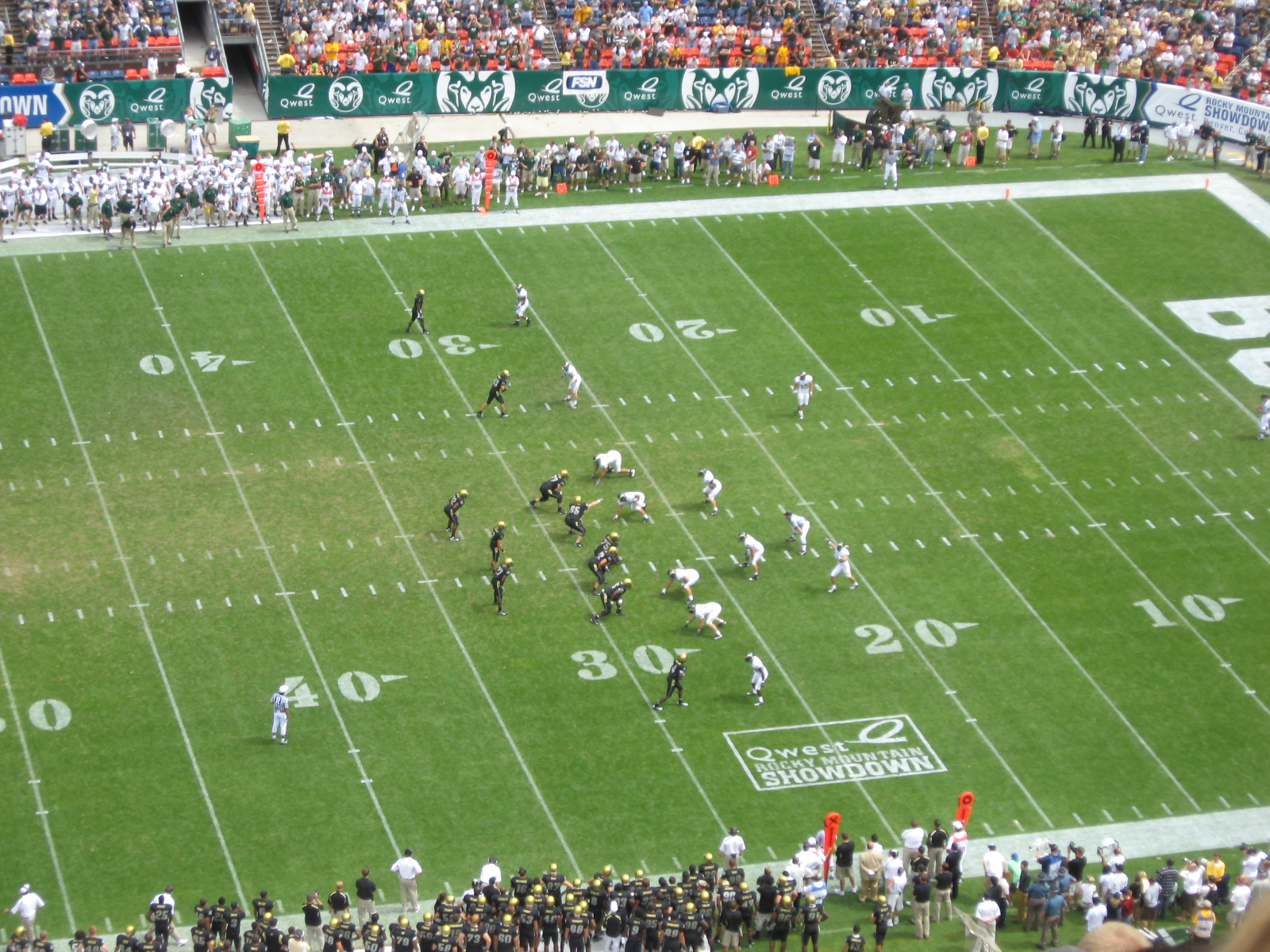
Colorado on offense against the Rams.

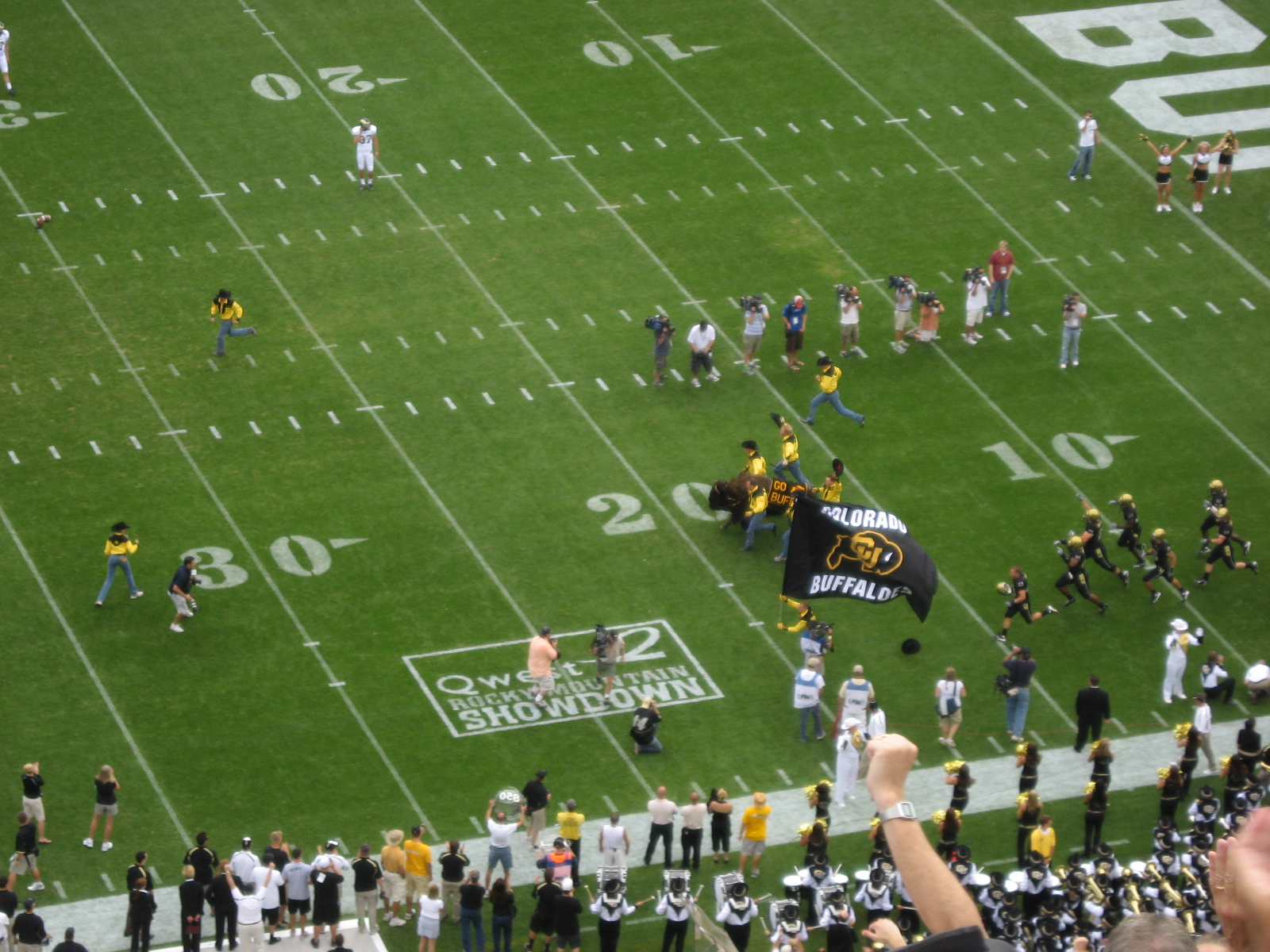
Ralphie leads the Buffaloes on to the field to start the season.

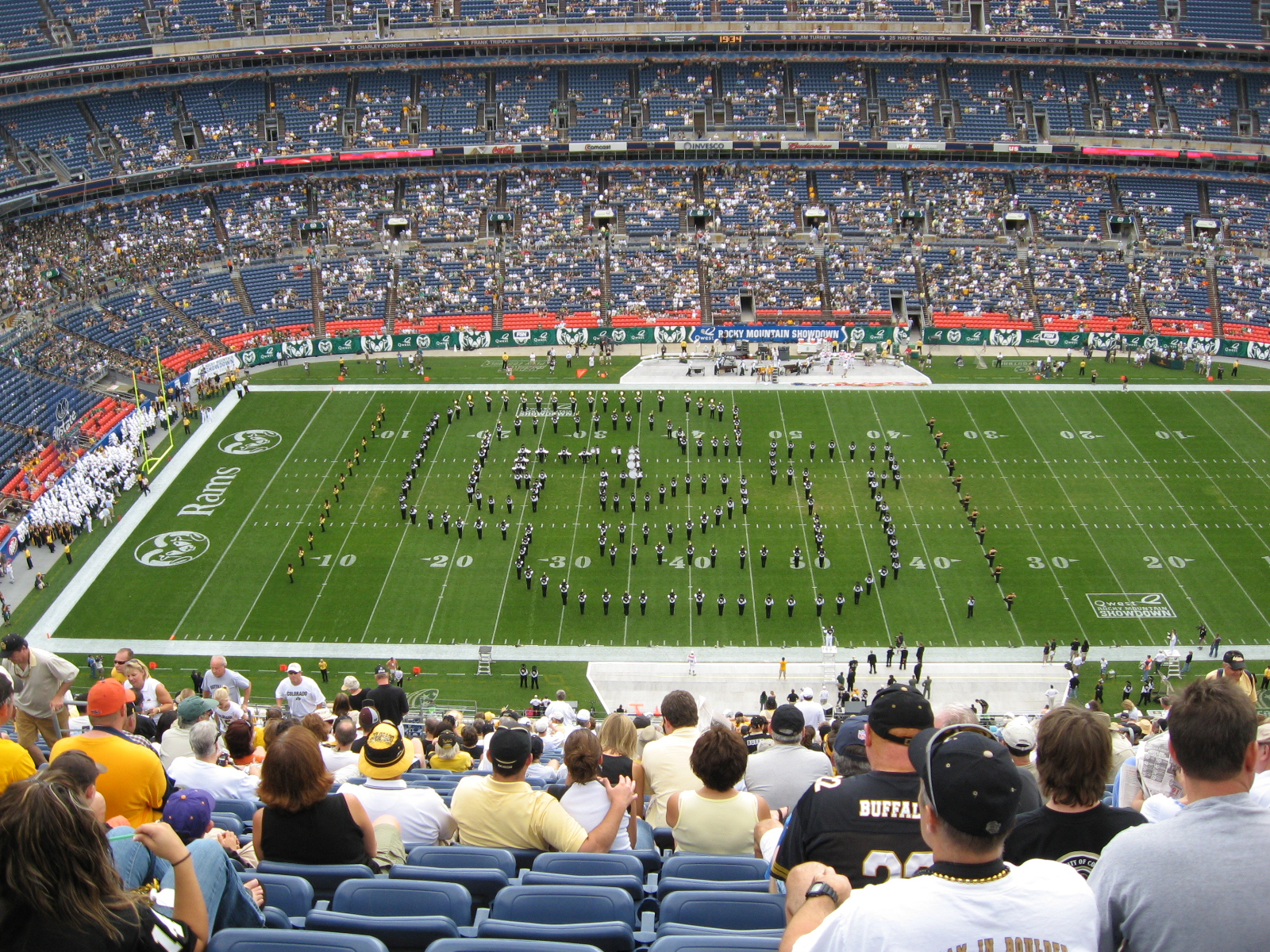
The band forms the CU logo letters before the start of every home game.

=== Arizona State ===
	1	2	3	4	Total
Buffaloes	14	0	0	0	14
Sun Devils	0	19	14	0	33

Colorado lost last season to Arizona State (21–3), the only time the teams have previously played each other. The game was scheduled to start at 8:28 p.m. Mountain Time. Entering the game, Colorado had a 9–2 record in the state of Arizona, including 8–0 against the Arizona Wildcats and 1–2 in the Fiesta Bowl. A sellout crowd larger than 71,000 was expected to be in attendance. Colorado had won their last two road games against Pacific-10 Conference opponents before this game; Washington State Cougars in 2004 and UCLA Bruins in 2003.

Arizona State entered the game 1–0, with a win the previous week over the San Jose State Spartans. Head coach Dennis Erickson was going for his 150th win in his 215th game. Coming into the game, Arizona State was 3–2 all time against the Big 12 Conference.

The Buffaloes scored two touchdowns in the first quarter including an interception return for a touchdown by Terrence Wheatley, while holding the Sun Devils scoreless. ASU responded with three touchdowns in the second quarter, but they missed their second extra point (wide left) and their attempt at a two-point conversion after their third touchdown, so they took a 19–14 lead into halftime. Colorado did not score for the rest of the game. Arizona added two more touchdowns in the third quarter.

The actual crowd attendance was 58,417.

=== Florida State ===
	1	2	3	4	Total
Seminoles	7	3	6	0	16
Buffaloes	0	0	0	6	6

Colorado welcomed Florida State (1–1) for their home opener. Florida State won the only previous game between the two schools on September 20, 2003.

Florida State came into the game with a win the previous week over the UAB Blazers and a loss in the season opener against the Clemson Tigers. The game was scheduled to start at 8:10 p.m. Mountain Time and aired on ESPN. There were approximately 3,000 tickets remaining 3 days before the game. Florida State was 15–11 all-time against Big 12 Conference teams coming into the game.

Colorado was 7–5 all-time against Atlantic Coast Conference teams and 0–4 when playing on September 15 before the game. There were only 4 current Colorado players that dressed for the previous match-up in 2003: Eberhart, Wheatley, Robinson and Sanders. Colorado students and fans were planning to "black out" the stadium by wearing black clothing.

Actual attendance was 52,951. Colorado's Eberhart missed two field goals of 37 and 46 yards. Colorado scored a touchdown with 3:36 left in the game to keep their record scoring streak alive; the latest score in a game to keep the streak alive. Colorado has not been shutout in a football game since November 12, 1988, when they played the Nebraska Cornhuskers. They have not been shutout at home since November 15, 1986, by the Oklahoma Sooners. Terrence Wheatley left the game with a knee injury during the 4th quarter, with his future status undetermined.

In the week after the game, Matt DiLallo was named to the Ray Guy Award watchlist.

=== Miami University ===
	1	2	3	4	Total
RedHawks	0	0	0	0	0
Buffaloes	7	21	7	7	42

Colorado beat the Miami University RedHawks by a score of 42–0. It was first time the RedHawks were shut out since a 1993 loss to Ball State. In sophomore quarterback Daniel Raudabaugh’s first start of the season for Miami, he completed 11 of 32 passes for only 95 yards. The Colorado defense was never able to sack Raudabaugh, but they did not allow him time to set his feet for passes. Colorado out gained Miami 634–139 in total yardage. The Buffaloes’ offense rushed for 359 after only running for 134 total yards in three previous games.

=== Oklahoma ===
Oklahoma Sooners at Colorado Buffaloes

Quarter	1	2	3	4	Total
Oklahoma	7	10	7	0	24
Colorado	0	7	3	17	27

at Folsom Field • Boulder, Colorado

- Date: September 29
- Game time: 11:30 a.m. MDT
- Game weather: Cloudy • 68 °F (20 °C) • Wind 6 NE
- Game attendance: 50,031
- Referee: Randy Christal
- Automated ScoreBook

Game information

Oklahoma

- Sam Bradford
  8/19, 112 Yds, TD, 2 INT
- Patrick Allen
  18 Rush, 96 Yds
- Joe Jon Finley
  1 Rec, 43 Yds

Colorado

- Cody Hawkins
  22/36, 220 Yds, 2 TD, 2 INT
- Hugh Charles
  24 Rush, 110 Yds, TD
  5 Rec, 48 Yds

Oklahoma was first to score by capitalizing on a D. J. Wolfe interception returned to the Colorado 11. Sam Bradford connected with Juaquin Iglesias for the 13 yard touchdown. The Buffalo's scored next by driving the ball 70 yards capped off by a 25-yard touchdown rush by Hugh Charles. The Sooners responded 49 seconds later thanks to a 34-yard touchdown run by Allen Patrick. The Sooners added 3 more as a result of a 28-yard Hartley field goal to return to the locker rooms at halftime with a 17–7 lead.

Scoring summary

Quarter	Time	Drive			Team	Scoring information	Score	
Quarter	Time	Plays	Yards	TOP	Team	Scoring information	OU	COLO
1	1:49	3	11	1:25	Oklahoma	Iglesias 13-yard touchdown reception from Bradford, Hartley kick good	7	0
2	8:26	8	69	4:01	Colorado	Charles 25-yard touchdown run, Eberhart kick good	7	7
2	7:37	3	80	0:49	Oklahoma	Patrick 34-yard touchdown run, Hartley kick good	14	7
2	0:48	11	72	5:13	Oklahoma	28-yard field goal by Hartley	17	7
3	12:23	1	17	0:08	Oklahoma	Patrick 17-yard touchdown run, Hartley kick good	24	7
3	4:10	10	50	4:01	Colorado	41-yard field goal by Eberhart	24	10
4	14:50	9	62	3:32	Colorado	DeVree 4-yard touchdown reception from Hawkins, Eberhart kick good	24	17
4	4:05	3	16	0:39	Colorado	Sprague 15-yard touchdown reception from Hawkins, Eberhart kick good	24	24
4	0:00	6	23	2:51	Colorado	45-yard field goal by Eberhart	24	27
"TOP" = time of possession. For other American football terms, see Glossary of American football.							24	27

=== Baylor ===
	1	2	3	4	Total
Buffaloes	10	20	10	3	43
Bears	0	9	7	7	23

=== Kansas State ===
	1	2	3	4	Total
Buffaloes	3	10	7	0	20
Wildcats	17	6	17	7	47

=== Kansas ===
	1	2	3	4	Total
#15 Jayhawks	0	3	10	6	19
Buffaloes	0	0	7	7	14

=== Texas Tech ===
	1	2	3	4	Total
Buffaloes	7	7	17	0	31
Red Raiders	0	6	13	7	26

=== Missouri ===
	1	2	3	4	Total
#9 Tigers	7	24	17	7	55
Buffaloes	10	0	0	0	10

=== Iowa State ===
	1	2	3	4	Total
Buffaloes	0	21	0	7	28
Cyclones	0	0	21	10	31

Colorado seemed to have this game under control with a 21—0 lead at halftime. However, Iowa State rallied back in the second half for the victory. Coach Hawkins made a controversial call going for a first down on 4th and 1 on Colorado's own 43—yard line after Iowa State refused a 10-yard holding penalty in the third quarter. The Buffaloes fell short of making the first down when Demetrius Sumler was stopped by Jesse Smith. Iowa State would score their first points of the game three plays later.

Bret Culbertson of Iowa State kicked a 24—yard field goal with 12:21 left in the game to put the Cyclones up 31—21. Kevin Eberhart of Colorado had earlier missed a 43—yard field goal. Colorado then fought back and Scotty McKnight scored a 9—yard touchdown pass from Cody Hawkins with 2:40 left in the game. The defensed forced a 3 and out after the kickoff to get the ball back with 46 seconds left in the game on their own 28 yard line. In 5 passing plays, 4 complete, they moved the ball 34 yards to the Iowa State 33 yard line. With no timeouts, they rushed the field goal unit on to the field and Eberhart made a 50—yard field goal with 1 second left on the clock. However, Colorado was penalized 5 yards for snapping the ball before it was whistled ready for play (officially offensive delay of game) which nullified the field goal. With 1 second left on the clock, Eberhart again made the 55—yard field goal try, but the officials ruled the ball had not been snapped before time expired. The field goal was again nullified and the game was over.

=== Nebraska ===
	1	2	3	4	Total
Cornhuskers	14	21	0	16	51
Buffaloes	17	7	20	21	65

=== Alabama ===
	1	2	3	4	Total
Buffaloes	0	14	3	7	24
Crimson Tide	20	7	0	3	30

Colorado earned a bowl bid to the Independence Bowl against the Alabama Crimson Tide on December 2, 2007. This was third football game ever between the two schools, with the teams having split the previous two games. They were also both bowl games, the 1969 Liberty Bowl, where Colorado won 47–33, and the 1991 Blockbuster Bowl where Alabama won 30–25.

Alabama scored on their opening drive off of a Leigh Tiffin field goal to lead 3–0. Colorado's first offensive play of the game resulted in an interception by Rolando McClain. Once again, Alabama relied on another field goal from Tiffin to push their lead to 6–0. Later in the quarter, Alabama's John Parker Wilson would throw a touchdown to Keith Brown and Matt Caddell to push the Crimson Tide to a 20–0 lead after one quarter. Early in the second quarter, Wilson would connect to Nikita Stover on a 31–yard touchdown pass and the Crimson Tide lead 27–0 after just under 20 minutes played in the game. The Buffaloes would control the majority of the second quarter after Wilson threw an interception. Buffaloes freshman quarterback Cody Hawkins threw touchdown passes to Tyson DeVree and Dusty Sprague to close the gap, as the Crimson Tide lead 27–14 at halftime. The only score in the third quarter would come from Kevin Eberhart on a Colorado field goal. Leigh Tiffin kicked a field goal as the Crimson Tide lead 30–17, though Cody Hawkins and Tyson DeVree would connect on another passing touchdown. In a desperation attempt with 0:01 left in the fourth quarter, Colorado would attempt several laterals but would fall short of midfield.

Alabama's victory sent them to a 7–6 overall record as they avoided a second consecutive losing season. Colorado had its second consecutive losing season for the first time in 22 years.

== Statistics ==
Colorado does not include bowl game statistics as part of their season total statistics. The statistics below therefore are for the 12 game regular season and do not include any statistics recorded during the bowl game against Alabama.

Source for all statistics below: https://web.archive.org/web/20110606161411/http://www.cubuffs.com/pdf3/100956.pdf?ATCLID=1207369&SPSID=3844&SPID=255&DB_OEM_ID=600

=== Team ===
	Team	Opp
Scoring	331	353
Points per game	27.6	29.4
First downs	234	236
Rushing	90	75
Passing	124	148
Penalty	20	13
Total offense	4524	4673
Avg per play	5.07	5.63
Avg per game	377.0	389.4
Fumbles lost	26–10	18–6
Penalties – yards	84–696	80–656
Avg per game	7.0–58.0	6.7–54.7

	Team	Opp
Punts – yards	63-2495	71-2875
Avg per punt	39.6	40.5
Time of possession/game	31:24	28:36
3rd down conversions	67–194	60–173
4th down conversions	13–26	9–16
Touchdowns scored	38	42
Field goals – attempts – long	15–23, 54yd	16–19, 52yd
PAT – attempts	38–39	37–39
Attendance	303,051	232,001
Games/Avg per game	50,508	46,400

- The neutral site game against Colorado State is not recorded in the attendance figures above. The attendance for that game was 68,133.

==== Scores by quarter ====
	1	2	3	4	OT	Total
Opponents	52	115	123	63	0	353
Buffaloes	82	96	79	71	3	331

=== Offense ===
==== Rushing ====
Name	GP-GS	Att	Gain	Loss	Net	Avg	TD	Long	Avg/G
Hugh Charles	11-	185	1022	33	989	5.3	8	41	89.9
Demetrius Sumler	11-	100	351	16	335	3.4	4	30	30.5
Brian Lockridge	8-	38	227	14	213	5.6	1	47	26.6
Byron Ellis	12-	32	133	2	131	4.1	2	28t	10.9
Dusty Sprague	12-	10	68	0	68	6.8	1	19	5.7
Patrick Williams	12-	6	39	2	37	6.2	0	24	3.1
Josh Smith	10-	10	43	9	34	3.4	0	13	3.4
Jake Behrens	9-	5	33	0	33	6.5	0	23	3.7
Kendrick Celestine	11-	6	37	10	27	4.5	0	17	2.5
Kevin Moyd	6-	4	18	2	16	4.0	0	9	2.7
Stephone Robinson	11-	5	9	4	5	1.0	0	6	0.5
Samson Jagoras	12-	1	0	2	−2	−2.0	0	−2	−0.2
Nick Nelson	3-	6	13	15	−2	−0.3	0	7	−0.7
Cody Hawkins	12–12	40	89	100	−11	−0.3	3	12	−0.9
TEAM	–	9	0	73	−73		0	−1	
Total	12	457	2082	282	1800	3.94	90	47	150.0

- A t in the Long column means the play was also a touchdown.

==== Passing ====
Name	GP-GS	Effic	Att-Cmp-Int	Pct	Yds	TD	Lng	Avg/G
Cody Hawkins	12–12	117.4	424–239–15	56.4	2693	19	65	224.4
Nick Nelson	3-	80.8	6–3–0	50.0	22	0	10	7.3
Scotty McKnight	12-		1–1–0	100.0	9	0	9	
Brian Lockridge	8-		1–0–0	0.0	0	0	0	
Matt DiLallo	12-		1–0–0	0.0	0	0	0	
TEAM			3–0–0	0.0	0	0	0	
Total			436–243–15	55.7	2724	19	65	227.0

==== Receiving ====
Name	GP-GS	No.	Yds	Avg	TD	Long	Avg/G
Scotty McKnight	12-	43	488	11.3	4	40	40.7
Tyson DeVree	11-	28	308	11.0	6	29	28.0
Dusty Sprague	12-	27	336	12.4	2	28	28.0
Patrick Williams	12-	27	265	9.8	0	31	22.1
Hugh Charles	11-	24	233	9.7	1	33	21.1
Josh Smith	10-	23	451	19.6	0	65	45.1
Riar Geer	12-	14	128	9.1	2	32	10.7
Byron Ellis	12-	12	39	3.3	1	9	3.3
Kendrick Celestine	11-	11	151	13.7	0	37	13.7
Joe Sanders	12-	8	71	8.9	0	14	5.9
Cody Crawford	12-	7	73	10.4	0	20	6.1
Demetrius Sumler	11-	6	41	6.8	1	12	3.7
Stephone Robinson	11-	5	65	13.0	0	35	5.9
Nate Solder	12-	3	50	16.7	0	23	4.2
Samson Jagoras	12-	2	12	6.0	0	4	1.0
Cody Hawkins	12-	1	9	9.0	0	9	0.8
Patrick Devenny	6-	1	3	3.0	1	3t	0.5
Jake Behrens	9-	1	1	1.0	1	1t	0.1
Total		243	2724	11.2	19	65	227

- A "t" in the Long column means the play was also a touchdown.

=== Defense ===
Name	GP	Tackles				Sacks	Pass defense		Interceptions				Fumbles		Blkd kick
Name	GP	Solo	Ast	Total	TFL-yds	No-yds	BrUp	QBH	No.-yds	Avg	TD	Long	Rcv-yds	FF	Blkd kick
Jordon Dizon	12	120	40	160	7–13	4–29	3	10	2–79	39.5	1	42t	0	1	0
Daniel Dykes	12	60	23	83	0–0	0–0	3	4	1–0	0	0	0	0	2	0
Jeff Smart	12	43	37	80	4–16	0–0	5	8					0	1	0
Brad Jones	12	45	27	72	2–4	2–4	3	9					0	0	0
Ryan Walters	11	31	32	63	0–0	0–0	5	5	1–0	0	0	0	0	2	0
Benjamin Burney	12	37	18	55	4–27	0–0	8						0	0	0
George Hypolite	12	34	10	44	5–11	6–42	1	8	1–6	6.0	0	6	0	0	0
Cha'pelle Brown	12	34	8	42	2–4	0–0	12	1	1–51	51.0	0	51	0	0	0
Terrence Wheatley	10	32	10	42	1–2	0–0	10	2	5–65	13.0	1	35t	0	1	0
Brandon Nicolas	12	28	9	37	8–16	3–17	2	3					0	0	0
Alonzo Barrett	12	29	7	36	5–16	1–6	2	7	1–4	4.0	0	4	0	0	0
Maurice Lucas	12	24	6	30	3–3	2–16	1	2					0	0	0
Lionel Harris	10	18	5	23	1–4	1–12	1	0	2–30	15.0	0	32	0	0	0
Gardner McKay	12	16	0	16	1–3	0–0	5	0					0	1	0
Jake Duren	9	8	5	13	1–1	0–0	1	0					0	0	0
R.J. Brown	3	7	5	12	1–1	0–0	0	1					0	0	0
Chris Perri	9	5	2	7	2–4	0–0	0	0					0	0	0
Marquez Herrod	8	3	1	4	1–4	0–0	0	1					0	0	0
Jimmy Smith	6	3	1	4	0–0	0–0	1	0	1–31	31.0	1	31t	0	0	0
Jalil Brown	3	1	2	3	0–0	0–0	0	0					0	0	0
B.J. Beatty	2	1	0	0–0	0–0	0	0						0	0	0
Taj Kaynor	8	0	1	1	0–0	0–0	0	0					0	0	0
Jason Brace	11	0	0	0	0–0	0–0	0	0					0	0	0
Eric Lawson	4	0	0	0	0–0	0–0	0	0					0	0	0
Nate Vaiomounga	4	0	0	0	0–0	0–0	0	0					0	0	0
Total		579	249	828	48–129	19–130	63	126	15–266	17.7	3	51	0	8	0

- A "t" in the Longest Interception return column means it was also for a touchdown.

=== Special teams ===
Name	Punting								Kickoffs				
Name	No.	Yds	Avg	Long	TB	FC	I20	Blkd	No.	Yds	Avg	TB	OB
Matt DiLallo	61	2447	40.11	57	3		22	1					
Tom Suazo	1	48	48.0	0	0	0	0	0					
TEAM	1	−6	−6.0	0	0	0	0	0					
Total	62	2495	39.60	57	3		22	1					

Name	Punt returns					Kick returns				
Name	No.	Yds	Avg	TD	Long	No.	Yds	Avg	TD	Long
Chase McBride	33	316	9.6	0	43					
Alonzo Barrett	2	32	16.0	0	17					
Stephone Robinson	4	54	13.5	0	42	1	10	10.0	0	10
Daniel Dykes	1	7	7.0	0	7					
Jordon Dizon	0	5		0	5					
Gardner McKay	0	−3		0	−3					
Terrence Wheatley						37	919	24.8	0	68
Hugh Charles						14	364	26.0	0	34
Byron Ellis						5	71	14.2	0	19
Scotty McKnight						1	21	21.0	0	21
Tyson DeVree						1	0	0.0	0	0
R.J. Brown						0	2		0	2
TEAM						1	−7	−7.0	0	−7
Total	40	411	10.3	0	43	60	1380	23.0	0	68
