= Hypolite =

Hypolite is a surname and a given name. People with the name include:

- Chekira Lockhart Hypolite, Dominican politician
- George Hypolite (born 1987), American football player
- Hypolite Dupuis (1804–1879), Canadian fur trader
- Hypolite Taremae (born 1968), Solomon Islands politician

== See also ==
- Florvil Hyppolite (1828–1896), Haitian general and president
- Jean Hyppolite (1907–1968), French philosopher
