= James Cox (quarterback) =

American football player (born 1983)

Profile
- Position: Quarterback

Personal information
- Born: December 29, 1983 (age 42); Northridge California, U.S.
- Listed height: 6 ft 3 in (1.91 m)
- Listed weight: 220 lb (100 kg)

Career information
- College: Colorado

Awards and highlights
- 2001–02 Scholar-Athlete Award

James Cox (born December 29, 1983) is a former starting quarterback for the Colorado Buffaloes football team in 2005 and 2006.

== College career ==
=== 2003–04 ===
He mainly saw action as a replacement for Joel Klatt when injured or when the outcome of the game was already decided. He played in two games in 2003 and five games, including his first start in place of Klatt, in 2004. His first start came on October 16, 2004, against Iowa State when Klatt suffered a neck injury the previous week against Oklahoma State. However, head coach Gary Barnett said the decision to start Cox in place of Klatt was not solely based on Klatt's injury.

My perspective at this point in time is that that is the best decision for our football team. (Klatt’s injury) was not the reason for the decision, but it certainly figures in. I will just leave it at that. —Gary Barnett

But Cox would be pulled in the second quarter after throwing an interception.

=== 2005 ===
Cox was a backup all season to Klatt, seeing action in seven games but only when the outcome had already been decided. However, when Klatt suffered a season-ending concussion during the Big 12 Championship game on December 3, 2006, Cox saw the majority of the action for the season but went 1–8 with 9 yards passing. He was named the starter for the Champs Sports Bowl. Cox was ineffective in the bowl game on December 27, 2006, against Clemson going 4–12 with 26 yards and 4 sacks and was replaced with Brian White.

=== 2006 ===
With a new head coach, Dan Hawkins, all positions were up for grabs (except the kicker, which Mason Crosby already had a lock on the position), especially the quarterback position with Joel Klatt's eligibility used up. Cox, the only senior quarterback on the team and the only quarterback with career starts for experience was thought to be the favorite. But he missed all of spring training with a broken thumb while his two main competitors, juniors Bernard Jackson and Brian White practiced. (Cody Hawkins, also the head coach's son, redshirted for the 2006 season.) On August 20, 2006, Coach Hawkins announced Cox would be the starting quarterback. He started the first game of the season on September 2, 2006, against Division I-AA Montana State. Colorado lost the game 19–10 in the start of the horrible season. Cox went 8–22 with no touchdowns or interceptions, despite starting the game with the longest first play from scrimmage in Colorado's history, a 42-yard pass to Patrick Williams. He was surprisingly replaced as starter the following week by Bernard Jackson.

Cox threw just 8 passes the rest of the season seeing only limited action. He missed traveling with the team in Week 4 against Georgia due to the death of his father. He suffered a season ending broken thumb requiring surgery against Kansas on October 28, 2006.

=== Statistics ===
College statistics
		Passing							Rushing				
Season	G	Att	Com	Int	Pct.	Yds	TD	Long	Att	Yds	Avg.	TD	Long
2003	2	1	1	0	100.0	0	0	0	2	−3	−1.5	0	3
2004	5	49	28	3	57.1	330	2	45	11	37	3.4	1	12
2005	7	29	13	0	44.8	93	0	17	7	3	0.4	0	6
2006	4	30	11	0	36.7	124	0	42	10	−12	−1.2	1	9
Totals	18	109	53	3	48.6	547	2	45	30	25	0.8	2	12

== Personal ==
Cox majored in communication at Colorado. He was a 2001–02 National Football Foundation and College Football Hall of Fame Scholar-Athlete Award recipient.
