= Jordon Dizon =

American football player (born 1986)

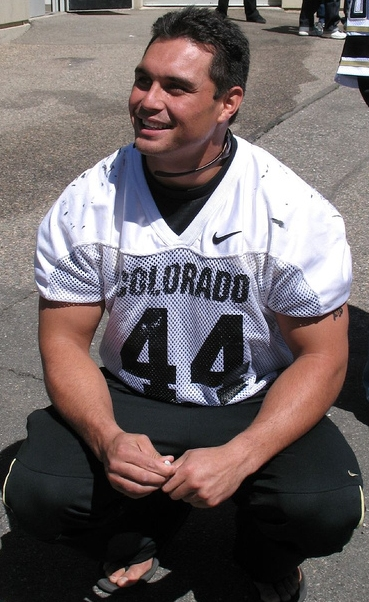
- Dizon with the Colorado Buffaloes in 2007

Denver Broncos
- Title: Director of pro personnel

Personal information
- Born: January 16, 1986 (age 40); Kauaʻi, Hawaii, U.S.
- Listed height: 6 ft 0 in (1.83 m)
- Listed weight: 232 lb (105 kg)

Career information
- Position: Linebacker (No. 57)
- High school: Waimea (Waimea, Hawaii)
- College: Colorado (2004-2007)
- NFL draft: 2008: 2nd round, 45th overall pick

Career history

Playing
- Detroit Lions (2008–2010)

Operations
- Denver Broncos (2015–2021); Pro scout (2015–2020); Assistant director of pro personnel (2021); Philadelphia Eagles (2022–2024) National scout; Denver Broncos (2025–present) Director of pro personnel

Awards and highlights
- As a player: Consensus All-American (2007); First-team All-Big 12 (2007); Second-team All-Big 12 (2006); Big 12 Defensive Player of the Year (2007); Big 12 Defensive Freshman of the Year (2004); As an executive: 2× Super Bowl champion (50, LIX)

Career NFL statistics
- Total tackles: 56
- Sacks: 1
- Forced fumbles: 1
- Fumble recoveries: 2
- Stats at Pro Football Reference

Jordon Dizon (born January 16, 1986) is an American professional football executive and former linebacker who currently serves as the director of pro personnel for the Denver Broncos of the National Football League (NFL). Dizon played college football for the Colorado Buffaloes, earning consensus All-American honors in 2007. The Detroit Lions selected him in the second round of the 2008 NFL draft, and he played for the Lions for two seasons before suffering a severe knee injury in 2010, which ended his career. Post-retirement, he has worked as an executive for the Broncos and the Philadelphia Eagles, winning the Super Bowl with both teams.

== Early life ==
Dizon was born and raised on the Hawaiian island of Kauaʻi. The son of Clifford Dizon and Darla Abbatiello-Higa, he attended Waimea High School, graduating in 2004. Playing running back and linebacker for the school of 860, Dizon rushed for 1,157 yards and 13 touchdowns in only five games as a junior, registering 75 stops on defense. During that year, Dizon rushed 37 times for 376 yards and five touchdowns in a 55-0 win over Kapaa—all career highs. Injured through most of his senior season (two games played: one carry, 12 yards, one touchdown; nine catches, 250 yards, three touchdowns), the Buffaloes were the only program to extend Dizon a scholarship offer, although he was recruited by other Big 12 and Pac-10 schools. He committed to play in Boulder on July 8, 2003, despite never having visited the state of Colorado. Dizon also lettered in basketball, track, and soccer during his time in high school.

== College career ==
Dizon attended the University of Colorado Boulder, where he played for the Buffaloes from 2004 to 2007. He first played safety as a true freshman at Colorado, but was moved to linebacker before the season began. On September 4, 2004, playing against Colorado State University, Dizon became the first true freshman in school history to start a season opener at inside linebacker. Playing in all 12 games as an 18-year-old, Dizon easily set the school freshman record for tackles in a season with 82. Over the next two years, Dizon continued to rack up the tackles, posting 61 in 2005 and 137 in 2006. The latter number was most tackles made by a CU player in nearly a decade (Ryan Sutter had 170 in 1997).

During 2007, Dizon posted a single-game career-high in tackles against CSU (22) and set the single-season school record for third-down stops, with 19 in 12 games. Rarely leaving the field for the Buffs, Dizon missed only 34 of Colorado's 830 defensive snaps during the 2007 season. His 160 tackles were nearly double the next closest player on the team (safety Dan Dykes registered 83), and he finished his senior season with the most total tackles of any player on any Division I team in the nation. Colorado linebackers coach Brian Cabral, who recruited Dizon out of high school, called the senior "the most complete, every down player that I've ever coached."

As a senior, Dizon recorded the best statistical season for a Buff linebacker since Matt Russell's 1996 Butkus-winning campaign. He was voted runner-up for the 2007 Butkus Award, given each year to college football's best linebacker. Dizon was recognized as a consensus first-team All American, after receiving first-team honors from the Walter Camp Football Foundation, the Associated Press, Sporting News, ESPN, and Rivals.com for the 2007 NCAA Division I-A football season, and was named the Big 12 Conference's Defensive Player of the Year as a senior. A four-year starter for the Buffs, Dizon finished his collegiate career as the second-leading tackler among all active players.

=== College statistics ===
			Tackles					Fumbles		Passing Game			
Season	Games	Plays	UT	AT	TT	For Loss	3DS	Forced	Recovered	Sacks	Hurries	PBU	INT
2004	12	597	51	31	82	6	7	1	0	1	1	4	0
2005	12	475	42	19	61	7	5	0	0	3	4	1	0
2006	12	679	80	57	137	11	17	1	2	4	2	1	0
2007	12	796	120	40	160	11	19	1	0	4	8	3	2
TOTALS	48	2547	293	147	440	35	48	3	2	12	15	9	2

=== Awards and recognition ===
- 2004
  - Big 12 Defensive Newcomer of the Year
  - Defensive Freshman of the Year (Big 12 Coaches)
  - Second-team Freshman All-American (The Sporting News, Rivals.com)
  - Honorable mention All-Big 12 (Associated Press)
  - Freshman All-Big 12 team (The Sporting News)
- 2005
  - Honorable mention All-Big 12 (Big 12 Coaches)
- 2006
  - Second-team All-Big 12 (Associated Press)
  - Honorable mention All-Big 12 (Big 12 Coaches)
  - First-team All-Big 12 (San Antonio Express-News)
  - Butkus Award watch list
- 2007
  - Consensus First-team All-American
    - Walter Camp Football Foundation
    - The Sporting News
    - Associated Press
    - ESPN
    - Rivals.com
  - Big 12 Defensive Player of the Year
  - First-team All-Big 12 (Big 12 Coaches, San Antonio Express-News)
  - Butkus Award Runner-up
  - Lott Trophy semifinalist
  - Second-team Academic All-Big 12
  - Mid-season All-American
    - Sports Illustrated
    - Rivals.com
    - Phil Steele's College Football
  - Mid-season All-Big 12

== Professional career ==
Pre-draft measurables
Height	Weight	Arm length	Hand span	40-yard dash	10-yard split	20-yard split	20-yard shuttle	Three-cone drill	Vertical jump	Broad jump	Bench press
5 ft 11 7/8 in (1.83 m)	229 lb (104 kg)	31 1/4 in (0.79 m)	8 1/2 in (0.22 m)	4.63 s	1.58 s	2.63 s	4.35 s	6.78 s	34.5 in (0.88 m)	9 ft 10 in (3.00 m)	12 reps
All values from NFL Combine/CU Pro Day

His 40-yard dash and 34.5 inch vertical jump impressed scouts, while Dizon's meager 12 repetitions lifting 225 pounds was considered poor for a linebacker. On April 26, 2008, Dizon was chosen 45th overall in the second round of the 2008 NFL draft by the Detroit Lions.

Dizon's first season saw the rookie struggle to find consistent playing time. He finished the season with 31 total tackles, 14 of which came on special teams. When hired in January 2009, coach Jim Schwartz changed defensive schemes, moving Dizon back to the outside linebacker position. During the 2009 off-season, Dizon earned high praise from Lions defensive coordinator Gunther Cunningham and linebackers coach Matt Burke, the latter of whom noted, "Jordon’s probably been one of the hardest workers I have. He works really hard at it. He wants to do better, he wants to do it right and he really works at it. I’ve been really pleased with the work he’s done."

Dizon tore two tendons in his knee and damaged a third during the 2010 NFL preseason. He was placed on season-ending injured reserve on August 16, 2010, after an ACL tear was diagnosed. Dizon was released by the Lions on July 28, 2011.

== Executive career ==
=== Denver Broncos ===
In 2015, Dizon was hired as a pro scout by Denver Broncos who would go on to win Super Bowl 50 the same season. He was later promoted to assistant director of pro personnel in 2021.

=== Philadelphia Eagles ===
On May 14, 2022, Dizon was hired by the Philadelphia Eagles to serve as a national scout. Dizon won Super Bowl LIX as a part of the Eagles front office in 2024

=== Denver Broncos (second stint) ===
On May 16, 2025, the Denver Broncos hired Dizon to serve as the team's director of pro personnel, marking his second stint with the organization.

== Personal life ==
Dizon graduated from the University of Colorado in May 2008 with a degree in economics. He attended Waimea High School in Kauaʻi, Hawaii, the westernmost high school in the United States. Growing up in Kauaʻi, Dizon often hunted wild boar with only a knife. He is an avid golfer, shooting sub-80 before his senior season began.

== See also ==
- List of NCAA major college football yearly tackles leaders
- 2005 Colorado Buffaloes football team
- 2006 Colorado Buffaloes football team
- 2007 Colorado Buffaloes football team
- 2007 College Football All-America Team
