= Lorenzo Williams (American football) =

American gridiron football player (born 1984)

Profile
- Position: Defensive lineman

Personal information
- Born: October 23, 1984 (age 42); Midwest City, Oklahoma, U.S.
- Listed height: 6 ft 1 in (1.85 m)
- Listed weight: 260 lb (118 kg)

Career information
- College: Missouri
- NFL draft: 2008: undrafted

Career history
- Baltimore Ravens (2008)*; Montreal Alouettes (2008)*; Carolina Panthers (2008–2009)*
- * Offseason or practice squad member only

Awards and highlights
- First-team All-Big 12 (2007); First-team Freshman All-Big 12 (2004)
- Stats at CFL.ca (archive)

Lorenzo Williams (born October 23, 1984) is an American former professional football defensive tackle. He played college football for the Missouri Tigers.

Williams has been a member of the Baltimore Ravens and Carolina Panthers of the National Football League (NFL) and the Montreal Alouettes of the Canadian Football League (CFL).

== College career ==
As a redshirt freshman, Williams played in eleven games, making 21 tackles and 1 sack, with his best game coming against Kansas when he made 6 tackles. He also had 3 tackles against Troy, Oklahoma State and Baylor. After the season, he was named to the first-team freshman All-Big 12.

Williams, as a sophomore he started in Missouri's twelve games. In his first year as a defensive tackle, Williams recorded 35 tackles, 5½ sacks and 9½ tackles for losses.

In his junior year, Williams, recorded 53 tackles, 10½ tackles for losses and 6 sacks. He also recovered 3 fumbles and forced 2 others.

As a senior, Williams was voted one of four team captains by his team members. Williams recorded 34 tackles, 12 1/2 tackles for a loss and 7 1/2 sacks. He also had 3 forced fumbles, 3 recovered fumbles, 4 blocked kicks, 2 sacks were for safeties and 1 touchdown. He finished #4 in sacks in University of Missouri football history (behind Brian Smith, Justin Smith and Aldon Smith. He was also #1 in the Big 12 in career sacks (20) in 2007 before being surpassed by Ndamukong Suh. He was also named first-team All-Big 12.

== Professional career ==
=== Baltimore Ravens ===
Williams was signed as an undrafted free agent by the Baltimore Ravens on April 29, 2008. He was released during the Ravens final cuts on August 30, 2008.

=== Montreal Alouettes ===
On September 20, 2008, Williams was signed to the practice squad of the Montreal Alouettes.

=== Carolina Panthers ===
Williams was signed to the practice squad of the Carolina Panthers on December 23, 2008. When his contract expired after the 2008 season he was re-signed to a future contract on January 14, 2009. He was waived on August 31.

=== Galactic Fun Zone ===
After his football career, Williams choose to become a small business owner. He opened Galactic Fun Zone, a college project, in August 2010. Galactic Fun Zone is a family entertainment center that includes Laser Tag Arcade and 8 lane Bowling Alley. He was awarded as the SBA Small Business of the Year for Innovation and Entrepreneurship in 2010.
