= 2007 All-Big 12 Conference football team =

The 2007 All-Big 12 Conference football team consists of American football players chosen as All-Big 12 Conference players for the 2007 Big 12 Conference football season. The conference recognizes two official All-Big 12 selectors: (1) the Big 12 conference coaches selected separate offensive and defensive units and named first- and second-team players (the "Coaches" team); and (2) a panel of sports writers and broadcasters covering the Big 12 also selected offensive and defensive units and named first- and second-team players (the "Media" team).

== Offensive selections ==
=== Quarterbacks ===
- Chase Daniel, Missouri (Coaches-1; Media-1)
- Todd Reesing, Kansas (Coaches-2; Media-2)

=== Running backs ===
- Jamaal Charles, Texas (Coaches-1; Media-1)
- Dantrell Savage, Oklahoma State (Coaches-1; Media-1)
- Brandon McAnderson, Kansas (Coaches-2; Media-2)
- James Johnson, Kansas State (Media-2)
- Marlon Lucky, Nebraska (Coaches-2)

=== Centers ===
- Adam Spieker, Missouri (Coaches-1; Media-1)

=== Offensive linemen ===
- Anthony Collins, Kansas (Coaches-1; Media-1)
- Duke Robinson, Oklahoma (Coaches-1; Media-1)
- Tony Hills, Texas (Coaches-1; Media-1)
- Cody Wallace, Texas A&M (Coaches-1; Media-2)
- Louis Vasquez, Texas Tech (Media-1)
- Phil Loadholt, Oklahoma (Coaches-2; Media-2)
- David Koenig, Oklahoma State (Coaches-2; Media-2)
- Tyler Polumbus, Colorado (Coaches-2)
- Carl Nicks, Nebraska (Coaches-2)
- Brandon Walker, Oklahoma (Coaches-2)
- Tyler Luellen, Missouri (Media-2)
- Kirk Elder, Texas A&M (Media-2)

=== Tight ends ===
- Martin Rucker, Missouri (Coaches-2; Media-1)
- Chase Coffman, Missouri (Media-2)
- Brandon Pettigrew, Oklahoma State (Coaches-1)

=== Receivers ===
- Michael Crabtree, Texas Tech (Coaches-1; Media-1)
- Jordy Nelson, Kansas State (Coaches-1; Media-1)
- Jeremy Maclin, Missouri (Coaches-1)
- Adarius Bowman, Oklahoma State (Coaches-2; Media-2)
- Marcus Henry, Kansas (Coaches-2; Media-2)
- Malcolm Kelly, Oklahoma (Coaches-2)

== Defensive selections ==
=== Defensive linemen ===
- Auston English, Oklahoma (Coaches-1; Media-1)
- George Hypolite, Colorado (Coaches-1; Media-1)
- James McClinton, Kansas (Coaches-1; Media-1)
- Lorenzo Williams, Missouri (Coaches-1; Media-1)
- Ian Campbell, Kansas State (Coaches-1)
- Nathan Peterson, Oklahoma State (Coaches-2; Media-2)
- Frank Okam, Texas (Coaches-2; Media-2)
- Demarcus Granger, Oklahoma (Coaches-2)
- Chris Harrington, Texas A&M (Coaches-2)
- Derek Lokey, Texas (Coaches-2)
- Stryker Sulak, Missouri (Coaches-2; Media-2)
- Brandon Williams, Texas Tech (Media-2)

=== Linebackers ===
- Jordon Dizon, Colorado (Coaches-1; Media-1)
- Curtis Lofton, Oklahoma (Coaches-1; Media-1)
- Joe Mortensen, Kansas (Coaches-1; Media-1)
- Sean Weatherspoon, Missouri (Coaches-2; Media-1)
- Alvin Bowen, Iowa State (Coaches-2; Media-2)
- Ian Campbell, Kansas State (Media-2)
- Mark Dodge, Texas A&M (Media-2)
- Joe Pawelek, Baylor (Media-2)
- Misi Tupe, Texas A&M (Coaches-2)

=== Defensive backs ===
- Reggie Smith, Oklahoma (Coaches-1; Media-1)
- Aqib Talib, Kansas (Coaches-1; Media-1)
- Terrence Wheatley, Colorado (Coaches-1; Media-1)
- Nic Harris, Oklahoma (Coaches-1; Media-2)
- Marcus Griffin, Texas (Coaches-1)
- William Moore, Missouri (Coaches-2; Media-1)
- Cornelius Brown, Missouri (Coaches-2; Media-2)
- Jordan Lake, Baylor(Coaches-2; Media-2)
- D.J. Wolfe, Oklahoma (Coaches-2; Media-2)
- Justin McKinney, Kansas State (Media-2)
- Brandon Foster, Texas (Media-2)

== Special teams ==
=== Kickers ===
- Jeff Wolfert, Missouri (Coaches-2; Media-1)
- Alex Trlica, Texas Tech (Coaches-1)
- Garrett Hartley, Oklahoma (Coaches-2)
- Brooks Rossman, Kansas State (Media-2)

=== Punters ===
- Tim Reyer, Kansas State (Coaches-1; Media-1)
- Justin Brantly, Texas A&M (Coaches-2)
- Matt Fodge, Oklahoma State (Media-2)

=== All-purpose / Return specialists ===
- Jeremy Maclin, Missouri (Coaches-1; Media-1)
- Marcus Herford, Kansas (Coaches-2)
- Quan Cosby, Texas (Media-2)

== Key ==
Bold = selected as a first-team player by both the coaches and media panel

Coaches = selected by Big 12 Conference coaches

Media = selected by a media panel

== See also ==
- 2007 College Football All-America Team
