= Justin Brantly =

American football player (born 1986)

No. 16
- Position: Punter

Personal information
- Born: March 28, 1986 (age 40); Corpus Christi, Texas, U.S.
- Listed height: 6 ft 3 in (1.91 m)
- Listed weight: 242 lb (110 kg)

Career information
- College: Texas A&M
- NFL draft: 2009: undrafted

Career history
- Houston Texans (2009)*; Omaha Nighthawks (2010–2011)
- * Offseason or practice squad member only

Awards and highlights
- First-team All-Big 12 (2008); Second-team All-Big 12 (2007)

Justin Jay Brantly (born March 28, 1986) is an American former football punter. He played for the Omaha Nighthawks of the United Football League (UFL). He was signed by the Houston Texans as an undrafted free agent in 2009. He played college football at Texas A&M.

== Early life ==
Brantly went to school in East Bernard, Texas, where his father, Jerry Brantly, served as an assistant coach under Dale Lechler, the father of NFL and former Texas A&M punter Shane Lechler. Lechler and Brantly were childhood friends. Justin later went to Sealy High School in Sealy, Texas, where he ran track and played basketball and baseball.

He was voted into the UIL All-Century Defensive Football third-team.

Rivals.com ranked him the 18th kicker prospect in the 2005 recruiting class. He chose to play for Texas A&M over Southern California due to the small-town atmosphere at A&M. He played in the 2005 U.S. Army All-American Bowl.

== College career ==
Brantly compiled a 44.3 career punting average, which ranks second in school history behind Shane Lechler's 44.7 set from 1996 to 1999. Brantly punted 44 times inside the opponent's 20-yard line and recorded 57 career punts of more than 50 yards. He hit a career-best 80-yard punt against Colorado in 2005.

During his senior season, Brantly led the Big 12 and placed third nationally with a 45.7-yard average. He booted 18 of his 51 punts inside the opponent's 20-yard line, and hit at least one punt of 50 or more yards in 10 of the 12 games.

After his senior season, he played in the Texas vs. The Nation Game on January 31, 2009.

=== College awards and honors ===
- 2005 Rivals.com first-team freshman All-American
- 2006 Big 12 Honorable mention
- 2007 Second-team All-Big 12
- 2006, 2007, 2008 Ray Guy Award candidate
- 2008 First-team Academic All-Big 12
- 2008 First-team All-Big 12 (League's coaches, Associated Press, Rivals.com, Waco Tribune-Herald, and College Football News); named to the second-team by the Dallas Morning News and Houston Chronicle
- 2008 Rivals.com Second-team All-American
- 2008 SI.com honorable mention All-American
- 2008 College Football News third-team All-American

== Professional career ==
=== Pre-draft ===
Brantly weighed 247 pounds and measured 6-foot-3 and 3/8 at the Texas A&M Pro Day on March 4, 2009.

=== Houston Texans ===
Brantly was not drafted in the 2009 NFL draft, but later signed as a free agent with the Houston Texans. He was released by the Texans in June 2009. He worked out with other teams during the 2009 regular season.

=== Omaha Nighthawks ===
Brantly signed with the Omaha Nighthawks of the United Football League in July 2010.
