= Brian Daniels (American football) =

American football player (born 1984)

No. 63
- Position: Guard

Personal information
- Born: October 31, 1984 (age 42); Denver, Colorado, U.S.
- Listed height: 6 ft 4 in (1.93 m)
- Listed weight: 303 lb (137 kg)

Career information
- College: Colorado
- NFL draft: 2007: undrafted

Career history
- Minnesota Vikings (2007–2008)

Awards and highlights
- Second-team All-Big 12 (2006)

Brian Daniels (born October 31, 1984) is an American former professional football guard who played for the Minnesota Vikings of the National Football League (NFL). He was signed by the Vikings as an undrafted free agent in 2007. He played college football at Colorado.

He is currently a member of the Glendale Raptors rugby squad in Glendale, Colorado.
