= George Hypolite =

American football player (born 1987)

Profile
- Position: Defensive tackle

Personal information
- Born: August 1, 1987 (age 39); Los Angeles, California
- Listed height: 6 ft 1 in (1.85 m)
- Listed weight: 305 lb (138 kg)

Career information
- College: Colorado
- NFL draft: 2009: undrafted

Career history
- Jacksonville Jaguars (2009)*; Carolina Panthers (2009)*
- * Offseason or practice squad member only

Awards and highlights
- First-team All-Big 12 (2007); Second-team All-Big 12 (2008)

Career NFL statistics
- Tackles: --
- Sacks: --
- Forced fumbles: --
- Stats at Pro Football Reference

George Hypolite [hip-puh-light] (born August 1, 1987) is an American former professional football defensive tackle. He was signed by the Jacksonville Jaguars as an undrafted free agent in 2009. He played college football at Colorado.

== College career ==
While playing for Colorado, He was given the nickname "The Rabid Goldfish" because Colorado alumnus Trey Parker (as Cartman) was announcing the starting lineup names and called Hypolite "The Rabid Goldfish."

== Professional career ==
=== Jacksonville Jaguars ===
After going undrafted in the 2009 NFL draft, Hypolite signed with the Jacksonville Jaguars as an undrafted free agent on April 26. He was waived by the team on July 23 when the team signed defensive tackle Montavious Stanley.

=== Carolina Panthers ===
Hypolite was signed by the Carolina Panthers on August 5, 2009, after defensive tackle Ma'ake Kemoeatu suffered as season-ending injury. He finished his stint with the Panthers by being terminated from the practice squad on September 22, 2009.

=== Post-retirement ===
Hypolite earned a juris doctor degree from the University of San Diego School of Law in 2014 and became an assistant city attorney with the City and County of Denver.

In August 2023, Hypolite was appointed Pueblo, Colorado city attorney by Mayor Nick Gradisar. Previously, he was a transportation law attorney in the state attorney general's office.

Pueblo mayor Heather Graham fired Hypolite on February 1, 2024, citing his confrontational attitude and his having damaged the relationship between the city of Pueblo and the Pueblo Urban Renewal Authority.

In late 2024, Hypolite began working as general counsel at the New Mexico Department of Finance and Administration.
