= Mark Fenton (American football) =

American football player (born 1983)

No. 60, 65, 68
- Position: Center

Personal information
- Born: November 14, 1983 (age 42); Hawthorne, California, U.S.
- Listed height: 6 ft 4 in (1.93 m)
- Listed weight: 295 lb (134 kg)

Career information
- College: Colorado
- NFL draft: 2007: undrafted

Career history
- Denver Broncos (2007–2008)*; Houston Texans (2008)*; Boise Burn (2009)
- * Offseason or practice squad member only

Awards and highlights
- First-team All-Big 12 (2005)

Mark Fenton (born November 14, 1983) is an American former football center. He played with the Denver Broncos and Houston Texans of the National Football League (NFL) as well as the Boise Burn of Arena Football 2 (af2) throughout the course of his career.. He was signed by the Broncos as an undrafted free agent in 2007. He played college football at Colorado.
