= Terrence Wheatley =

American football player (born 1985)

No. 22, 20
- Position: Cornerback

Personal information
- Born: May 5, 1985 (age 41); Walnut Creek, California, U.S.
- Listed height: 5 ft 9 in (1.75 m)
- Listed weight: 183 lb (83 kg)

Career information
- High school: Plano East (Plano, Texas)
- College: Colorado
- NFL draft: 2008: 2nd round, 62nd overall pick

Career history
- New England Patriots (2008–2010); Jacksonville Jaguars (2010); Buffalo Bills (2011); Tennessee Titans (2011–2012)*
- * Offseason or practice squad member only

Awards and highlights
- 2× First-team All-Big 12 (2006, 2007)

Career NFL statistics
- Total tackles: 4
- Pass deflections: 2
- Stats at Pro Football Reference

Terrence Wheatley (born May 5, 1985) is an American former professional football player who was a cornerback in the National Football League (NFL). He played college football for the Colorado Buffaloes and was selected by the New England Patriots in the second round of the 2008 NFL draft.

Wheatley was also a member of the Jacksonville Jaguars, Buffalo Bills and Tennessee Titans.

== Early life ==
Wheatley attended Plano East Senior High School in Plano, Texas, where he holds track and field records in the triple jump, the long jump, and the 100 meters. As a sophomore, he was the district champion in the long jump.

During his junior season in football, Wheatley had 70 tackles, six interceptions, 18 pass breakups, three forced fumbles and three fumble recoveries. Although a cornerback, Wheatley spent time at running back, where he had 23 rushing attempts for 200 yards and 11 catches for 161 yards and two touchdowns. He averaged 25 yards per kick return and eight per punt return.

During his senior season, he had 82 tackles, five interceptions, nine pass deflections, one forced fumble and one fumble recovery. Once again seeing time on offense, he had 25 catches, 410 yards and three touchdowns. He earned all-state honorable mention, all-district first team honors, and was named to the all-area first team of the Dallas Morning News as a cornerback and wide receiver. Rivals.com named him the 56th best cornerback prospect in high school football.

== College career ==
As a freshman at the University of Colorado, Wheatley saw action in 12 games, starting twice on defense. He had 24 tackles and five pass deflections during 268 snaps on defense. When Wheatley and Samuel Joseph started against Baylor, it marked the first time in Colorado history that two freshmen started at cornerback. Wheatley had eight tackles in the Baylor game, which was his season high.

As a sophomore, he played in all 13 games, starting the last five, including the Houston Bowl. However, during the season, he was held back by wrist, groin and hamstring injuries. He had 33 tackles, three passes broken up and four interceptions, which ranked second on the team. His first collegiate interception was returned for a touchdown, making him the 12th player in Colorado history to accomplish that feat.

In 2005, his true junior year, he had wrist surgery in the spring but because the wrist continued to bother him, he missed the entire season. As a redshirt junior in 2006 he had 57 tackles, five interceptions, and 11 passes broken up. After the season, he was named first-team All-Big 12 and All-Colorado.

During his senior season in 2007, Wheatley had 42 tackles and five interceptions in the first 10 games, before suffering a hairline fracture and missing the rest of the regular season. He was able to return for the Independence Bowl. He was named a third-team All-American and first-team All-Big 12 at cornerback, and received an honorable mention as a kick returner. Wheatley also appeared on the official watchlists for the Bronko Nagurski Trophy and the Jim Thorpe Award.

== Professional career ==
=== New England Patriots ===
Wheatley was drafted by the New England Patriots in the second round (62nd overall) in the 2008 NFL draft, and signed with them on July 22, 2008. As a rookie, Wheatley debuted in the first week of the season against Kansas City, and played in six of the first seven games as a reserve. In his first career start against the Indianapolis Colts on November 2 he suffered a wrist injury that forced him to be placed on injured reserve on November 17, after being inactive for the team's following two games. He finished the season with two tackles and two passes defensed.

Wheatley was active for five games in 2009, all as a reserve. He finished the season with two tackles.

After suffering a foot injury in the 2010 preseason, Wheatley did not practice or play for the first five weeks of the regular season; however, he remained inactive in Weeks 6 and 7 even after returning to practice in Week 6. He was active for the first time in 2010, but did not play in the Patriots' Week 8 win over the Minnesota Vikings. He was waived the following Saturday, in advance of the team's Week 9 game against the Cleveland Browns.

=== Jacksonville Jaguars ===
After clearing waivers, Wheatley signed a two-year contract with the Jacksonville Jaguars on November 8, 2010. He played in one game for the Jaguars before being placed on injured reserve on December 17, 2010. He was waived during final cuts in September 2011.

=== Buffalo Bills ===
Wheatley was signed to the Buffalo Bills' practice squad on September 13, 2011. He was promoted to the active roster on September 27.
