= Ralphie =

Ralphie is a masculine given name, often a diminutive form (hypocorism) of Ralph. It may refer to:

- Ralphie May (1972–2017), American stand-up comedian and actor
- Ralph "Ralphie" Cifaretto, a character on the TV series The Sopranos
- Ralphie Tennelli, a character on the TV series The Magic Schoolbus and The Magic School Bus Rides Again
- Ralphie the Buffalo, mascot of the University of Colorado Buffaloes
- Ralph "Ralphie" Parker, main character/narrator of the 1983 Christmas movie A Christmas Story

== See also ==
- Ralph Scopo (1932–1993), New York mobster nicknamed "Little Ralphie"
- Ralph Wiggum, character in the television series The Simpsons, often called "Ralphie" by his father
