= Bernard Jackson (quarterback) =

American football player (born 1985)

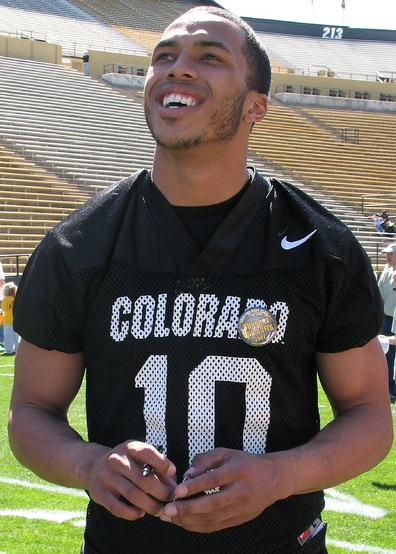
- Jackson before the 2007 Spring Game

No. 10
- Position: Quarterback

Personal information
- Born: April 2, 1985 (age 41); Los Angeles, California, U.S.
- Listed height: 6 ft 2 in (1.88 m)
- Listed weight: 200 lb (91 kg)

Career information
- College: Colorado

Bernard Lewis Jackson (born April 2, 1985) is an American former football player. He played college football as a quarterback at the University of Colorado at Boulder. As a junior, he was the starter for a majority of the 2006 season before losing his eligibility for academic reasons for his senior season.

== Early life ==
Jackson played quarterback for the Santiago Sharks at Santiago High School in Corona, California.

== College career ==
=== 2003–2005 ===
Jackson redshirted his freshman year at Colorado, where he was a communications major. In 2004, he saw action in six games at wide receiver and punt returner with minimal statistics recorded. He dislocated his elbow during a punt return which caused him to miss three games.

In 2005, Jackson saw action in six games early in the season, mainly in spot action and as a kick returner and tailback, again recording minimal statistics.

=== 2006 ===
With a new head giving coach, Dan Hawkins, all positions were up for grabs (except the kicker, which Mason Crosby already had a lock on the position), especially the quarterback position with Joel Klatt's eligibility used up. James Cox, the only senior quarterback on the team and the only quarterback with career starts for experience was thought to be the favorite. But he missed all of spring training with a broken thumb while his two main competitors, juniors Jackson and Brian White practiced. (Cody Hawkins, also the head coach's son, redshirted for the 2006 season.) On August 20, 2006, Coach Hawkins announced Cox would be the starting quarterback. He started the first game of the season on September 2, 2006, against Division I-AA Montana State. Colorado lost the game 19–10 in the start of the horrible season. Cox went 8–22 with no touchdowns or interceptions. Cox was surprisingly replaced as starter the following week by Jackson. Jackson remained the starter for the rest of the season.

Jackson was named as an honorable mention to the Colorado Buffaloes's all-decade team due to his excellence on and off the field.

=== 2007 ===
Jackson had strong competition from Cody Hawkins, Matt Ballenger, and Nick Nelson to remain the quarterback for this season. He was named one of three captains for the 2007 season prior to spring practice, where it was reported he may switch to another position. However, he was not able to remain academically eligible.

=== 2010 ===
Jackson played his final year of eligibility at Division II CSU Pueblo, with 34 receptions for 453 yards. He completed his degree in 2011.

=== Statistics ===
College statistics
		Passing							Rushing				
Season	G	Att	Com	Int	Pct.	Yds	TD	Long	Att	Yds	Avg.	TD	Long
2004	6	2	2	0	100.0	59	0	41	1	3	3.0	0	3
2005	6	0	0	0	0.0	0	0	0	8	10	1.3	0	7
2006	12	219	108	7	49.3	1298	7	63	155	677	4.4	7	62
Totals	24	221	110	7	49.8	1347	7	63	164	690	4.2	7	62

== Legal trouble ==
Jackson and teammate Lionel Harris were arrested on suspicion of first-degree burglary, aggravated robbery and felony menacing in connection with a June 5 robbery in an apartment in the 1000 block of University Avenue. On January 22, 2009, Jackson pleaded guilty to lesser crimes and was sentenced to five and one-half years in prison. On December 1, 2009, Jackson was released on probation, which would continue until late 2014.

== Coaching career ==
From 2011 to 2014, Jackson was wide receivers coach at CSU Pueblo. From 2015 to 2018, Jackson coached quarterbacks and wide receivers for Pueblo East High School.
