= 2007 Nebraska Cornhuskers football team =

American college football season

2007 Nebraska Cornhuskers football
- Conference: Big 12 Conference
- North Division
- Record: 5–7 (2–6 Big 12)
- Head coach: Bill Callahan (4th season)
- Offensive coordinator: Shawn Watson (1st season)
- Offensive scheme: West Coast
- Defensive coordinator: Kevin Cosgrove (4th season)
- Base defense: 4–3
- Home stadium: Memorial Stadium

2007 Big 12 Conference football standings
	Conf.			Overall
Team	W		L	W		L
North Division
No. 4 Missouri xy	7	–	1	12	–	2
No. 7 Kansas x%	7	–	1	12	–	1
Colorado	4	–	4	6	–	7
Kansas State	3	–	5	5	–	7
Nebraska	2	–	6	5	–	7
Iowa State	2	–	6	3	–	9
South Division
No. 8 Oklahoma xy$	6	–	2	11	–	3
No. 10 Texas	5	–	3	10	–	3
No. 22 Texas Tech	4	–	4	9	–	4
Oklahoma State	4	–	4	7	–	6
Texas A&M	4	–	4	7	–	6
Baylor	0	–	8	3	–	9
Championship: Oklahoma 38, Missouri 17
$ – BCS representative as conference champion; % – BCS at-large representative; x – Division champion/co-champions; y – Championship game participant; Rankings from AP Poll

The 2007 Nebraska Cornhuskers football team represented the University of Nebraska–Lincoln in the 2007 NCAA Division I FBS football season. The team was coached by Bill Callahan and played their home games at Memorial Stadium in Lincoln, Nebraska.

== Before the season ==
The Nebraska football team's schedule was rated the toughest in the Big 12 Conference, and the 12th toughest in the 2007 NCAA Division I FBS football season. The team had predictions to win the Big 12 North division.

After a tight competition with two-year backup Joe Ganz, former-Arizona State transfer quarterback Sam Keller won the starting position; Keller had spent the previous season on the scout team as per NCAA transfer rules.

== Schedule ==
Date	Time	Opponent	Rank	Site	TV	Result	Attendance
September 1	2:30 pm	Nevada*	No. 20	Memorial Stadium; Lincoln, NE	ABC	W 52–10	84,078
September 8	11:00 am	at Wake Forest*	No. 16	BB&T Field; Winston-Salem, NC	ESPN	W 20–17	32,483
September 15	7:00 pm	No. 1 USC*	No. 14	Memorial Stadium; Lincoln, NE (College GameDay)	ABC	L 31–49	84,959
September 22	11:30 am	Ball State*	No. 24	Memorial Stadium; Lincoln, NE	FSN	W 41–40	84,294
September 29	1:05 pm	Iowa State	No. 25	Memorial Stadium; Lincoln, NE (rivalry)		W 35–17	84,703
October 6	8:15 pm	at No. 17 Missouri	No. 25	Faurot Field; Columbia, MO (rivalry)	ESPN	L 6–41	70,049
October 13	11:30 am	Oklahoma State^{†}		Memorial Stadium; Lincoln, NE	PPV	L 14–45	84,334
October 20	1:05 pm	Texas A&M		Memorial Stadium; Lincoln, NE		L 14–36	84,473
October 27	2:30 pm	at No. 17 Texas		Darrell K Royal–Texas Memorial Stadium; Austin, TX	ABC	L 25–28	85,968
November 3	11:30 am	at No. 8 Kansas		Memorial Stadium; Lawrence, KS (rivalry)	FSN	L 39–76	51,910
November 10	11:30 am	Kansas State		Memorial Stadium; Lincoln, NE (rivalry)	Versus	W 73–31	84,665
November 23	11:00 am	at Colorado		Folsom Field; Boulder, CO (rivalry)	ABC	L 51–65	51,403
*Non-conference game; ^{†}Homecoming; Rankings from AP Poll released prior to the game; All times are in Central time

== Roster and coaching staff ==
2007 Nebraska Cornhuskers football team roster
Players
Coaches
Offense

Pos.	#	Name	Class
OL	66	Cruz Barrett	RFr
WR	1	Chris Brooks	So
C	59	Brett Byford (C)	Sr
WR	82	Wes Cammack	So
C	58	Mike Caputo	Fr
IB	19	Quentin Castille	Fr
OL	62	Andy Christensen	Jr
IB	6	Major Culbert	So
QB	15	Beau Davis	Jr
WR	26	Dan Erickson	Sr
QB	12	Joe Ganz	Jr
FB	41	Aaron Gillaspie	RFr
WR	11	Curenski Gilleylen	Fr
TE	39	Dan Glassman	RFr
IB	34	Cody Glenn	Jr
OL	75	Victory Haines	Sr
WR	7	Frantz Hardy	Sr
FB	30	Mike Hays	Fr
RB	10	Roy Helu Jr.	Fr
WR	8	Will Henry	RFr
OL	67	Jacob Hickman	So
TE	80	Ryan Hill	Fr
TE	86	Sean Hill	Sr
WR	4	Menelik Holt	So
OL	61	Mike Huff	Jr
IB	31	Austin Jones	Fr
OL	73	D.J. Jones	RFr
OL	78	Marcel Jones	Fr
QB	9	Sam Keller	Sr
FB	36	Thomas Lawson	Jr
QB	3	Zac Lee	So
WR	88	Ben Lester	Fr
IB	5	Marlon Lucky	Jr
OL	71	Mike Masin	Fr
TE	44	Mike McNeill	RFr
IB	32	Marcus Mendoza	Fr
TE	81	Josh Mueller	Sr
OL	76	Lydon Murtha	Jr
OL	77	Carl Nicks	Sr
WR	83	Terrence Nunn	Sr
WR	24	Niles Paul	Fr
WR	17	Todd Peterson	Jr
TE	85	J.B. Phillips	Sr
OL	69	Jordan Picou	Sr
WR	16	Maurice Purify	Sr
FB	48	Andy Sand	Sr
OL	70	Matt Slauson	Jr
OL	65	Mike Smith	RFr
WR	87	Nate Swift	Jr
TE	89	Hunter Teafatiller	Jr
FB	37	Kevin Thomsen	Fr
WR	39	Lance Thorell	Fr
OL	68	Keith Williams	RFr
IB	27	Kenny Wilson	Sr
QB	2	Patrick Witt	Fr
TE	49	Dreu Young	RFr

Defense

Pos.	#	Name	Class
DE	95	Pierre Allen	RFr
CB	21	Prince Amukamara	Fr
S	4	Larry Asante	So
DT	56	Shukree Barfield	Jr
CB	14	Anthony Blue	Fr
CB	1	Zackary Bowman (C)	Sr
LB	40	Lance Brandenburgh	Sr
S	8	Austin Cassidy	Fr
LB	31	Nick Covey	So
DE	94	Jared Crick	Fr
LB	52	Phillip Dillard	So
S	46	Ben Eisenhart	Sr
DL	92	Tyrone Fahie	RFr
S	30	Tierre Green	Sr
CB	2	Cortney Grixby	Sr
LB	41	Thomas Grove	Fr
S	28	Eric Hagg	Fr
DE	80	David Harvey	So
DL	96	Brandon Johnson	Sr
CB	25	Andre Jones	Sr
CB	19	Tyler Kester	Sr
LB	54	Colton Koehler	So
LB	12	Blake Lawrence	Fr
DE	75	Luke Lingenfelter	Fr
DL	63	Ben Martin	RFr
LB	59	Jay Martin	Fr
S	36	Mathew May	Fr
LB	13	Corey McKeon	Sr
DT	90	Terrence Moore	Fr
CB	5	Armando Murillo	Jr
S	33	Matt O'Hanlon	So
LB	15	Steve Octavien	Sr
DE	98	Zach Potter	Jr
DE	86	Andy Poulosky	Sr
DE	85	Thomas Rice	Sr
LB	51	Bo Ruud (C)	Sr
DE	89	Jonathon Santin	Fr
DE	88	Clayton Sievers	Jr
LB	35	Austin Stafford	Fr
DT	43	Ty Steinkuhler	Jr
DT	93	Ndamukong Suh	So
CB	18	Shawn Sullivan	Fr
S	3	Rickey Thenarse	So
DE	99	Barry Turner	Jr
LB	23	Latravis Washington	Fr
S	24	Adam Watson	RFr
CB	22	Anthony West	RFr
S	9	Bryan Wilson	Sr
LB	53	Tyler Wortman	Jr
DE	47	William Yancy	Fr

Special teams

Pos.	#	Name	Class
LS	56	Justin Baumgartner	Jr
P	90	Alex Henery	Fr
PK	20	Adi Kunalic	Fr
LS	82	T.J. O'Leary	Jr
P	97	Dan Titchener	Jr
PK	37	Jake Wesch	Jr

Head coach

- Bill Callahan
  4th season
  4th year at Nebraska
  Alma mater: Benedictine

Coordinators/assistant coaches

- Shawn Watson
  1st season as OC/QB coach
  2nd year at Nebraska
  Alma mater: Southern Illinois
- Kevin Cosgrove
  4th season as DC/LB coach
  4th year at Nebraska
  Alma mater: UW-Oshkosh
- Bill Busch
  1st season as RB coach
  8th year at Nebraska
  Alma mater: Nebraska Wesleyan
- Phil Elmassian
  3rd season as CB coach
  4th year at Nebraska
  Alma mater: William & Mary
- Ted Gilmore
  3rd season as WR coach
  3rd year at Nebraska
  Alma mater: Wyoming
- Randy Jordan
  4th season as RB coach
  4th year at Nebraska
  Alma mater: North Carolina
- Joe Rudolph
  1st season as TE coach
  1st year at Nebraska
  Alma mater: Wisconsin
- Dennis Wagner
  4th season as OL coach
  4th year at Nebraska
  Alma mater: Utah
- Buddy Wyatt
  1st season as DL coach
  1st year at Nebraska
  Alma mater: TCU
- Dave Kennedy
  4th season as S&C coach
  11th year at Nebraska
  Alma mater: Nebraska
- Keith Heckendorf
  2nd season as GA coach
  2nd year at Nebraska
  Alma mater: St. Cloud State
- Jon Osterhout
  2nd season as GA coach
  2nd year at Nebraska
  Alma mater: Sacramento State

Legend

- (C) Team captain
- (S) Suspended
- (I) Ineligible
- Injured
- Redshirt

Roster
Last update: January 16, 2011

Defense

FS
Tierre Green
Rickey Thenarse
Ben Eisenhart

WILL	MIKE	SAM
Bo Ruud	Corey McKeon	Steve Octavien
Blake Lawrence	Phillip Dillard	Lance Brandenburgh
⋅	⋅	⋅

SS
Larry Asante
Bryan Wilson
⋅

CB
Cortney Grixby
Anthony Blue
⋅

DE	DT	DT	DE
Barry Turner	Ndamukong Suh	Ty Steinkuhler	Zach Potter
Clayton Sievers	Kevin Dixon	Shukree Barfield	Pierre Allen
⋅	⋅	⋅	⋅

CB
Armando Murillo
Zack Bowman
Andre Jones
⋅

Offense

WR
Nate Swift
Todd Peterson
Menelik Holt

LT	LG	C	RG	RT
Carl Nicks	Jacob Hickman	Brett Byford	Matt Slauson; Mike Huff	Lydon Murtha
Mike Smith	Jordan Picou	Jacob Hickman	Keith Williams	Javario Burkes
⋅	⋅	⋅	⋅	⋅

TE
Sean Hill
J.B Phillips
Josh Mueller
⋅

WR
Maurice Purify
Terrence Nunn
Frantz Hardy

QB
Joe Ganz
Sam Keller (injured)
Patrick Witt
⋅

RB
Marlon Lucky
Quentin Castille
Roy Helu

FB
Andy Sand
Thomas Lawson
⋅

Special teams
PK Alex Henry
P Dan Titchener
KR Cortney Grixby
PR Cortney Grixby
Andre Jones
LS \

== Game summaries ==
=== Nevada ===
Nevada at Nebraska [box score]

Team	1	2	3	4	Total
Nevada	0	10	0	0	10
• Nebraska	7	14	24	7	52

- Date: September 1, 2007
- Location: Memorial Stadium, Lincoln, Nebraska
- Game start: 2:36 pm CST
- Game attendance: 84,078
- TV announcers (ABC): Dan Fouts (Play-by-play), Tim Brant (Color) & Todd Harris (Sideline)

Marlon Lucky was named the Walter Camp Football Foundation National Offensive Player of the Week for his career-best 233 yards rushing against Nevada.

=== Wake Forest ===
Nebraska at Wake Forest [box score]

Team	1	2	3	4	Total
• Nebraska	3	10	7	0	20
Wake Forest	0	10	7	0	17

- Date: September 8, 2007
- Location: BB&T Field, Winston-Salem, North Carolina
- Game start: 11:00 am CST
- Game attendance: 32,483
- TV announcers (ESPN): Dave Pasch (Play-by-play), Andre Ware (Color) & Erin Andrews (Sideline)

As ESPN described the game, "Sam Keller nearly gave away the game during his first road start at Nebraska. Zack Bowman jumped up to take it back for the Cornhuskers. Three plays after Keller threw an interception deep in Nebraska territory, Bowman picked off a Wake Forest pass in the end zone and the 16th-ranked Cornhuskers held on to win 20–17 on Saturday."

=== USC ===
USC at Nebraska [box score]

Team	1	2	3	4	Total
• USC	7	14	21	7	49
Nebraska	7	3	0	21	31

- Date: September 15, 2007
- Location: Memorial Stadium, Lincoln, Nebraska
- Game start: 7:00 pm CST
- Game attendance: 84,959
- TV announcers (ABC): Brent Musburger (Play-by-play), Kirk Herbstreit (Color) & Lisa Salters (Sideline)

After a bye week, the Trojans visited the Nebraska Cornhuskers in Lincoln, Nebraska. In the pre-season, the game was named as one of the candidates for the 10 most important games of 2007. For the Huskers, the game was especially critical to their hopes of showing progress under 4th year head coach Bill Callahan. The game marks the first time a No. 1-ranked team has visited Lincoln since 1978. Because of the game's significance, ESPN College GameDay chose it as the site of its weekly broadcast.

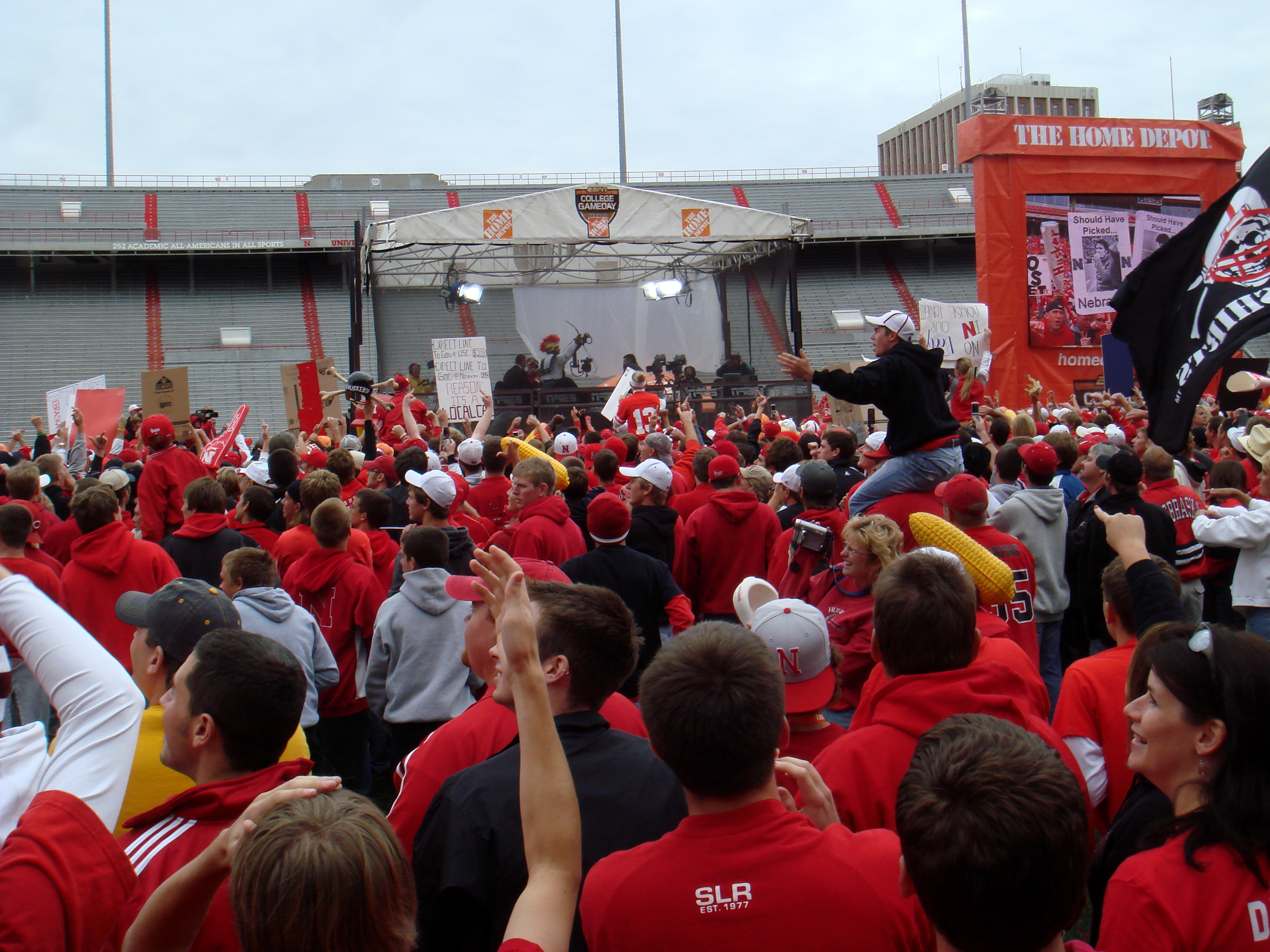
ESPN College GameDay: Cornhusker fans react negatively to Lee Corso's decision to pick USC to win the game; as per tradition, he dons the gear of the team he picks.

Callahan had been criticized for his conservative play-calling during the 2006 game in Los Angeles; instead of playing to win, it appeared the Huskers were playing to not get blown out by the then-favored Trojans. In that game the normally prolific West Coast offense of Nebraska, which had produced 541 yards a game, was corralled on the ground and attempted only 17 passes in a 28–10 Husker loss. For 2007, Callahan pledged to play more aggressively, using running back Marlon Lucky and quarterback Sam Keller. Keller, the Huskers redshirt senior starting quarterback, was a 2006 transfer from Arizona State; as a Sun Devil Keller started the first seven games of his 2005 junior season, throwing for 2,165 yards, before a disastrous game against USC where, after leading ASU to a 21–3 halftime lead, he and the offense fell apart on the way to a 38–28 loss where he was sacked five times and threw five interceptions. Due to NCAA transfer rules, Keller spent the 2006 season on the Huskers' scout team.

The Trojans stayed in nearby Omaha and practiced at a local high school; Carroll took the rare step of closing practice to outsiders after a local radio station announced the location. The game marked the return of primary receiver Patrick Turner and running back Chauncey Washington from injury; linebacker Brian Cushing, who injured his ankle early against Idaho, had not fully recovered but was allowed to suit-up as a reserve. Senior center Matt Spanos remained injured, and true freshman Kris O'Dowd was called to start again. Veteran secondary member Josh Pinkard was lost for the season after his sore knee gave out during a bye week practice, resulting in a torn ACL requiring surgery.

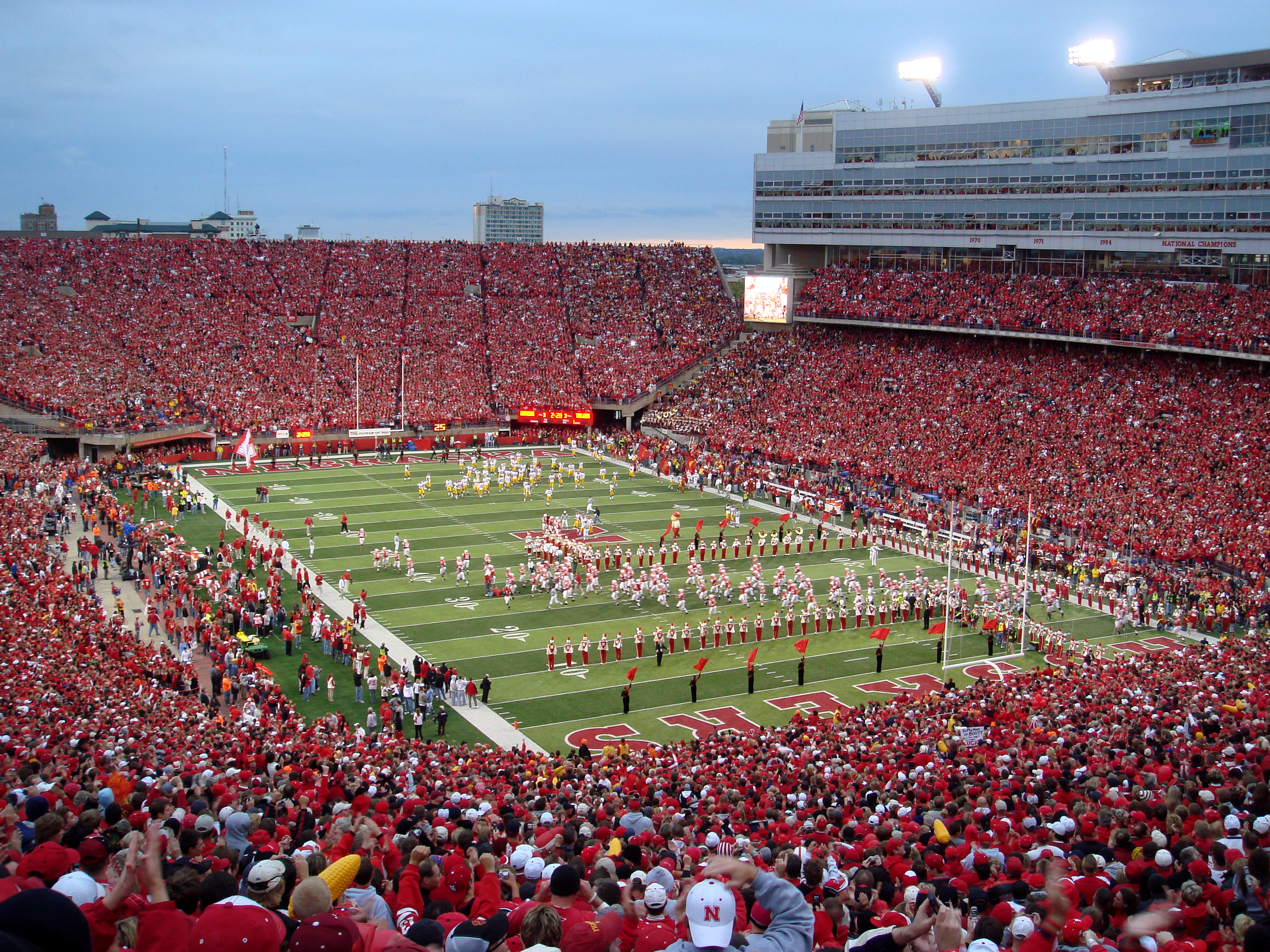
Teams take the field as Nebraska hosted USC for its 284th consecutive home sell out at Memorial Stadium.

Anticipation for the game was high in Lincoln, fueling strong demand for tickets and accommodations; the game brought celebrities including USC fans Will Ferrell (also an alumnus) and Keanu Reeves, Nebraska fans Larry the Cable Guy, Supreme Court Justice Clarence Thomas, Rush Limbaugh, and Ward Connerly; past Husker Heisman-winner Mike Rozier, Trojans Heisman-winner Marcus Allen and star Trojans safety Ronnie Lott were also on hand for the game. The game fell on Pete Carroll's 56th birthday; as a surprise, Carroll was treated to a recorded message by actor Kiefer Sutherland, star of his favorite television show, 24. The morning recording of College GameDay attracted 13,293 fans, second to the all-time record of 15,808 set by Nebraska in 2001. With 84,959 in attendance, Nebraska recorded its NCAA-record 284th consecutive home sellout dating back to 1962.

USC dominated the game 49–31, in a game that was not as close as the final score indicated: the Trojans led 42–10 going into the fourth quarter; Nebraska scored two touchdowns in the final five minutes during garbage time. The Trojans dominated on the ground, as they out-gained Nebraska 313–31 in rushing yards and averaged 8.2 yards per carry, the most ever against a Nebraska team. Stafon Johnson led USC running backs with a career-best 144 yards in 11 carries with one touchdown; other major contributors were C. J. Gable (69 yards in four carries, including a 40-yard run), Washington (43 yards in 12 carries with two touchdowns), and another versatile performance by fullback Stanley Havili (52 rushing yards in two rushes with one touchdown, and three pass receptions for 22 yards with one touchdown). The Trojans passing game again did not find a rhythm, with several dropped passes, but the defense was able to frustrate the Husker offense for most of the game and cause two pivotal 3rd quarter interceptions.

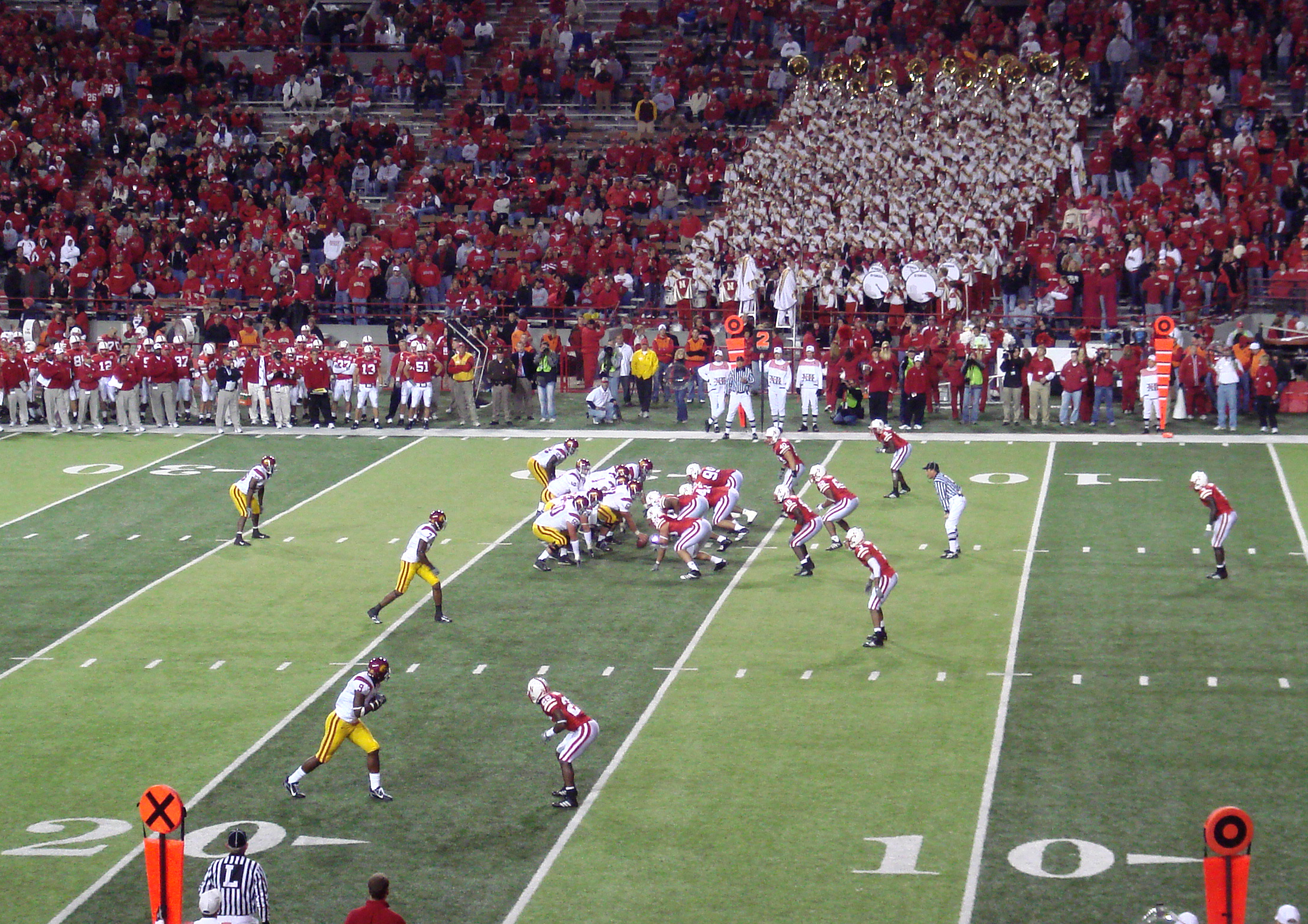
John David Booty leads a drive early in the fourth quarter.

The Trojans did not escape injuries, as linebacker Clay Matthews, substituting for the recovering Brian Cushing, broke his thumb, causing Cushing to enter the game as his replacement. The Trojans also suffered two injuries on kick returns: fullback Alfred Rowe suffered a mild concussion, and there was a moment of worry when returner Vincent Joseph, after being tackled and fumbling the ball, lay on the turf for over 10 minutes before being removed by stretcher with a bruised larynx and a neck sprain, but no serious injuries. Linebacker Rey Maualuga was flagged during a field goal attempt for the rarely called penalty of "disconcerting", which is given for "words or signals that disconcert opponents when they are preparing to put the ball in play".

After losing first place votes in the polls during the bye week, USC's performance regained six after their performance against the Huskers in a hostile environment. Receiving specific praise was the Trojans offensive line, as well as the continued poise and ability of freshman center O'Dowd.

=== Ball State ===
Ball State at Nebraska [box score]

Team	1	2	3	4	Total
Ball State	0	10	21	9	40
• Nebraska	7	7	14	13	41

- Date: September 22, 2007
- Location: Memorial Stadium, Lincoln, Nebraska
- Game start: 11:30 am CST
- Game attendance: 84,294
- TV announcers (FSN PPV): Greg Sharpe (Play-by-play), Matt Davison (Color) & Stacy Paetz (Sideline)

=== Iowa State ===
Iowa State at Nebraska [box score]

Team	1	2	3	4	Total
Iowa State	3	7	0	7	17
• Nebraska	0	7	21	7	35

- Date: September 29, 2007
- Location: Memorial Stadium, Lincoln, Nebraska
- Game start: 1:05 pm CST
- Game attendance: 84,703

=== Missouri ===
Nebraska at Missouri [box score]

Team	1	2	3	4	Total
Nebraska	3	3	0	0	6
• Missouri	14	6	14	7	41

- Date: October 6, 2007
- Location: Memorial Stadium, Columbia, Missouri
- Game start: 8:15 pm CST
- Game attendance: 70,049
- TV announcers (ESPN): Ron Franklin (Play-by-play), Ed Cunningham (Color) & Jack Arute (Sideline)

=== Oklahoma State ===
Oklahoma State at Nebraska [box score]

Team	1	2	3	4	Total
• Oklahoma State	17	21	0	7	45
Nebraska	0	0	0	14	14

- Date: October 13, 2007
- Location: Memorial Stadium, Lincoln, Nebraska
- Game start: 11:30 am CST
- Game attendance: 84,334
- TV announcers (FSN PPV): Greg Sharpe (Play-by-play), Kellen Winslow (Color) & Joel Goldberg (Sideline)

Athletic Director Steve Pederson was fired after this game. Former Nebraska head coach Tom Osborne was named as interim Athletic Director. He indicated that there would be no coaching changes during the season."

=== Texas A&M ===
Texas A&M at Nebraska [box score]

Team	1	2	3	4	Total
• Texas A&M	9	7	14	6	36
Nebraska	7	7	0	0	14

- Date: October 20, 2007
- Location: Memorial Stadium, Lincoln, Nebraska
- Game start: 1:05 pm CST
- Game attendance: 84,473

=== Texas ===
Nebraska at Texas [box score]

Team	1	2	3	4	Total
Nebraska	0	10	7	8	25
• Texas	3	0	6	19	28

- Date: October 27, 2007
- Location: Darrell K Royal–Texas Memorial Stadium, Austin, Texas
- Game start: 2:30 pm CST
- Game attendance: 85,968
- TV announcers (ABC): Ron Franklin (Play-by-play), Ed Cunningham (Color) & Jack Arute (Sideline)

Nebraska first played the Texas Longhorns in 1933 and the Longhorns hold a 7–4–0 record. Nebraska won the first meeting by the lopsided score of 26–0. As with Oklahoma State and Texas A&M, Nebraska plays the Longhorns two out of every four years as part of the Big 12 Conference schedule. Since their first meeting, the series has included a number of upsets and close calls. In 1960 a #4 ranked Longhorn squad was upset by an unranked Nebraska team, 14–13. In 1996 an unranked Texas team defeated #3 ranked Nebraska (who were also the defending national champions) 37–27 to win the inaugural Big 12 Conference football championship and deprive the Cornhuskers a shot at repeating as national champions. In 1998 an unranked Texas team beat #7 Nebraska 20–16.

In 1999 the two teams met twice. In the regular season, #18 Texas beat #3 Nebraska by 24–20. However, #3 Nebraska beat #12 Texas in the Big 12 Championship game, 6–22. In 2002 the Longhorns were ranked No. 7 and they went to Lincoln, Nebraska to play an unranked Nebraska team. In front of the largest crowd in Nebraska history (78,268) the 'Horns snapped the Huskers' national-best 26-game winning streak at Memorial Stadium by a score of 27–24. Most recently, in the 2006 game, #5 Texas faced #17 Nebraska on a snowy day in Lincoln. The Longhorns were trailing and needed a field goal by walk-on kicker Ryan Bailey (with just 23 seconds remaining in the game) to win 22–20.

On the morning of the game, oddsmakers favored Texas to win by 21 points. The weather forecast called for a high of 76 degrees and plentiful sunshine with winds NNE at 10 to 15 miles per hour. Texas stuck with their passing game for three quarters and was trailed Nebraska most of the way; the Cornhuskers led 17–9 to start the fourth. ESPN reported, "Once Texas figured out it should be running against one of the nation's worst run defenses, things turned out all right for the Longhorns."

The Longhorns may have switched to running game almost by chance. McCoy took a hard hit as he scrambled outside the pocket and was shaken up badly enough to leave the game for a play. John Chiles came in at quarterback; his one play, a zone-read handoff to Jamaal Charles, produced 24 yards. According to ESPN, "suddenly Texas had figured out how to beat a Cornhuskers' team that had been steamrolled on the ground in recent weeks. Texas only threw three passes in the fourth quarter."

Once Texas switched to the zone read offense, they quickly started gaining yards and points. Charles ran for a career-high 290 yards, including 216 yards and three long touchdown runs in the fourth quarter. His tally also set a new record for rushing against the Cornhuskers, surpassing the old record of 247 yards by Oklahoma's Billy Simms. Charles explained "It was my time to show everyone what I can do. When I saw a hole, I blasted through it." Texas finished with 181 yards passing and 364 yards rushing; Nebraska had 315 yards passing and 132 yards rushing. The running back was named the Walter Camp Football Foundation National Offensive Player of the Week.

The game was a milestone for one coach and a millstone for another; it was the 100th win for Mack Brown at Texas; and it put more pressure on beleaguered Nebraska coach Bill Callahan. Brown remarked on his victory, "A hundred is nice. I knew the game was going to come down like it did. It didn't surprise me. They made sure that I'll remember it the rest of my life." Callahan was fired five weeks later.

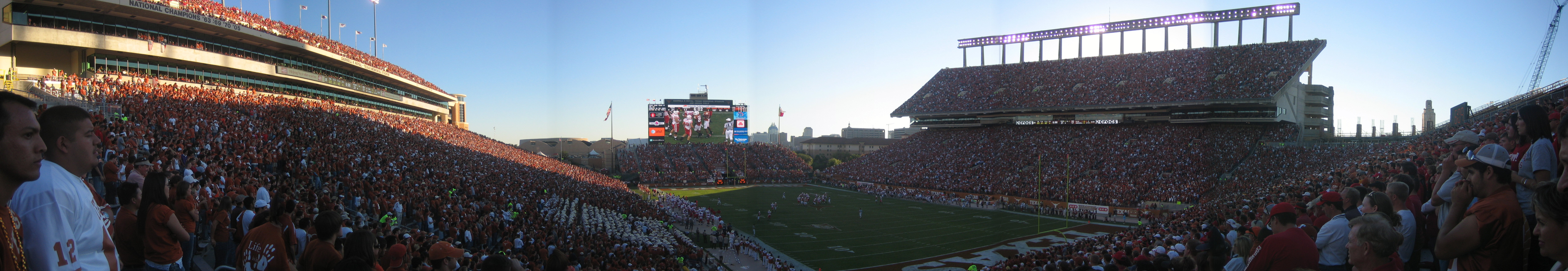
A panorama of Darrell K Royal–Texas Memorial Stadium in Austin, Texas during the game against the 2007 Texas Longhorns football team.

=== Kansas ===
Nebraska at Kansas [box score]

Team	1	2	3	4	Total
Nebraska	14	10	7	8	39
• Kansas	21	27	21	7	76

- Date: November 3, 2007
- Location: Memorial Stadium, Lawrence, Kansas
- Game start: 11:30 am CST
- Game attendance: 51,910
- TV announcers (FSN): Bill Land (Play-by-play), Dave Lapham (Color) & Emily Jones (Sideline)

The Nebraska-Kansas series is the longest uninterrupted series in college football at 102 years. In the 2007 meeting, Kansas beat Nebraska 76–39. The Jayhawks set an all-time record for most touchdowns and most points scored by a Nebraska opponent. Their 48 points in the first half was the most ever scored against Nebraska in the first half. With the win, Kansas took their record to 9–0 for the first time since 1908.

Fox Sports reported, "It was only the second victory for Kansas in the last 39 games against Nebraska, which appears to be coming to pieces in the fourth season of embattled coach Bill Callahan."

=== Kansas State ===
Kansas State at Nebraska [box score]

Team	1	2	3	4	Total
Kansas State	10	0	7	14	31
• Nebraska	14	24	14	21	73

- Date: November 10, 2007
- Location: Memorial Stadium, Lincoln, Nebraska
- Game start: 11:30 am CST
- Game attendance: 84,665
- TV announcers (Versus): Ron Thulin (play-by-play), Kelly Stouffer (color) & Lewis Johnson (sideline)

Getting just his second career start after taking over for the injured Sam Keller in the fourth quarter of the Texas game, Joe Ganz broke the school single-game records for passing yards and touchdowns.

=== Colorado ===
Nebraska at Colorado [box score]

Team	1	2	3	4	Total
Nebraska	14	21	0	16	51
• Colorado	17	7	20	21	65

- Date: November 23, 2007
- Location: Folsom Field, Boulder, Colorado
- Game start: 11:00 am CST
- Game attendance: 51,403
- TV announcers (ABC): Dave LaMont (Play-by-play), David Norrie (Color) & Vince Welch (Sideline)

It was a must-win situation for both teams, as they had identical 5–6 records and each needed a win to get to a bowl. Although they trailed by 11 points at the half, Colorado went on to win 65–51, as the Husker defense simply could not find an answer for Colorado's offense. Husker Coach Bill Callahan, having had his second losing season in four years, both being decided by a loss to Colorado, was fired the day after the game. Athletic Director Tom Osborne went on to hire Mark "Bo" Pelini as head coach.

== Rankings ==
Ranking movements Legend: ██ Increase in ranking ██ Decrease in ranking — = Not ranked
	Week															
Poll	Pre	1	2	3	4	5	6	7	8	9	10	11	12	13	14	Final
AP	20	16	14	24	25	25	—	—	—	—	—	—	—	—	—	—
Coaches	19	17	14	22	22	23	—	—	—	—	—	—	—	—	—	—
Harris	Not released				24	23	—	—	—	—	—	—	—	—	—	Not released
BCS	Not released							—	—	—	—	—	—	—	—	Not released

== After the season ==
The team was coached by Bill Callahan, who returned for his fourth year with the Huskers, and expectations for the season were high, considering NU had reached the Big 12 title game the previous year. But the Huskers recorded only their second losing season since 1961, and the second in four years (the last one coming in 2004 on Callahan's watch). Following the conclusion of the season, Callahan was fired by interim athletic director Tom Osborne.

On December 2, 2007, Bo Pelini was named as head coach for Nebraska by interim athletic director Tom Osborne.

=== Awards ===
Award	Name(s)
All-Big 12 2nd team	Marlon Lucky, Carl Nicks, Matt Slauson
All-Big 12 honorable mention	Larry Asante, Brett Byford, Cortney Grixby, Jacob Hickman, Lydon Murtha, Steve Octavien, Zach Potter, Maurice Purify, Bo Ruud, Dan Titchener
All-Big 12 Freshman 1st team	Anthony Blue, Jaivorio Burkes, Alex Henery

== Draft picks, signees, or other future professional players ==
- Prince Amukamara, 2011 1st–round pick of the New York Giants
- Larry Asante, 2010 4th–round pick of the Cleveland Browns
- Zackary Bowman, 2008 5th–round pick of the Chicago Bears
- Lance Brandenburgh, 2008 free agent signee of the San Francisco 49ers
- Chris Brooks, 2010 free agent signee of the Tampa Bay Buccaneers
- Brett Byford, 2008 free agent signee of the New York Jets
- Jared Crick, 2012 4th-round pick of the Houston Texans
- Phillip Dillard, 2010 4th–round pick of the New York Giants
- Joe Ganz, 2009 free agent signee of the Washington Redskins
- Cody Glenn, 2009 5th–round pick of the Washington Redskins
- Tierre Green, 2008 free agent signee of the Green Bay Packers
- Cortney Grixby, 2008 free agent signee of the Carolina Panthers
- Eric Hagg, 2011 7th–round pick of the Cleveland Browns
- Frantz Hardy, 2008 free agent signee of the Philadelphia Eagles
- Roy Helu Jr., 2011 4th–round pick of the Washington Redskins
- Alex Henery, 2011 4th–round pick of the Philadelphia Eagles
- Ricky Henry, 2011 UFL 1st–round pick of the Hartford Colonials
- Brandon Johnson, Sioux City Bandits
- Andre Jones, Central Valley Coyotes
- D.J. Jones, 2011 UFL 6th–round pick of the Omaha Nighthawks
- Marcel Jones, 2012 7th-round draft pick of the New Orleans Saints
- Sam Keller, 2008 free agent signee of the Tampa Bay Buccaneers
- Marlon Lucky, 2009 free agent signee of the Cincinnati Bengals
- Corey McKeon, 2008 free agent signee of the Tampa Bay Buccaneers
- Lydon Murtha, 2009 7th–round pick of the Miami Dolphins
- Carl Nicks, 2008 5th–round pick of the New Orleans Saints
- Matt O'Hanlon, 2010 free agent signee of the Carolina Panthers
- Steve Octavien, 2008 free agent signee of the Kansas City Chiefs
- Niles Paul, 2011 5th–round pick of the Washington Redskins
- Todd Peterson, 2009 free agent signee of the Jacksonville Jaguars
- Zach Potter, 2009 free agent signee of the New York Jets
- Andy Poulosky, Sioux City Bandits
- Maurice Purify, 2008 free agent signee of the Cincinnati Bengals
- Bo Ruud, 2008 6th–round pick of the New England Patriots
- Matt Slauson, 2009 6th–round pick of the New York Jets
- Mike Smith, 2011 UFL 5th–round pick of the Omaha Nighthawks
- Ty Steinkuhler, 2009 free agent signee of the New York Jets
- Ndamukong Suh, 2010 1st–round pick of the Detroit Lions
- Nate Swift, 2009 free agent signee of the Denver Broncos
- Barry Turner, 2010 free agent signee of the Detroit Lions
- Keith Williams, 2011 6th–round pick of the Pittsburgh Steelers
- Kenny Wilson, Sioux City Bandits
