= 2007 Nevada Wolf Pack football team =

American college football season

2007 Nevada Wolf Pack football

New Mexico Bowl, L 0–23 vs. New Mexico
- Conference: Western Athletic Conference
- Record: 6–7 (4–4 WAC)
- Head coach: Chris Ault (23rd season)
- Offensive coordinator: Chris Klenakis (7th season)
- Offensive scheme: Pistol
- Defensive coordinator: Ken Wilson (4th season)
- Base defense: 3–4
- Home stadium: Mackay Stadium

2007 Western Athletic Conference football standings
	Conf.			Overall
Team	W		L	W		L
No. 19 Hawaii $	8	–	0	12	–	1
Boise State	7	–	1	10	–	3
Fresno State	6	–	2	9	–	4
Nevada	4	–	4	6	–	7
Louisiana Tech	4	–	4	5	–	7
San Jose State	4	–	4	5	–	7
Utah State	2	–	6	2	–	10
New Mexico State	1	–	7	4	–	9
Idaho	0	–	8	1	–	11
$ – Conference champion and BCS representative as top non-AQ school to meet automatic qualification criteria; Rankings from AP Poll

The 2007 Nevada Wolf Pack football team represented the University of Nevada, Reno during the 2007 NCAA Division I FBS football season. Nevada competed as a member of the Western Athletic Conference (WAC). The Wolf Pack were led by Chris Ault in his 23rd overall and 4th straight season since taking over as head coach for the third time in 2004. They played their home games at Mackay Stadium.

== Schedule ==
Date	Time	Opponent	Site	TV	Result	Attendance
September 1	12:30 p.m.	at No. 20 Nebraska*	Memorial Stadium; Lincoln, NE	ABC	L 10–52	84,078
September 8	9:00 a.m.	at Northwestern*	Ryan Field; Evanston, IL	BTN	L 31–36	17,653
September 15	6:00 p.m.	Nicholls State*	Mackay Stadium; Reno, NV	ESPN Plus	W 52–17	15,233
September 29	1:00 p.m.	UNLV*	Mackay Stadium; Reno, NV (Fremont Cannon)		W 27–20	25,278
October 6	1:00 p.m.	Fresno State^{†}	Mackay Stadium; Reno, NV		L 41–49	18,503
October 14	5:00 p.m.	at Boise State	Bronco Stadium; Boise, ID (rivalry)	ESPN	L 67–69 ^{4OT}	30,394
October 20	12:00 p.m.	at Utah State	Romney Stadium; Logan, UT	KAME-TV/CSNW	W 31–28	9,462
October 27	1:00 p.m.	Idaho	Mackay Stadium; Reno, NV		W 37–21	11,960
November 2	5:00 p.m.	at New Mexico State	Aggie Memorial Stadium; Las Cruces, NM	ESPN2	W 40–38	12,268
November 16	8:00 p.m.	No. 13 Hawaii	Mackay Stadium; Reno, NV	ESPN2	L 26–28	22,437
November 24	1:00 p.m.	at San Jose State	Spartan Stadium; San Jose, CA	KAME-TV/NSN	L 24–27	12,678
December 1	1:00 p.m.	Louisiana Tech	Mackay Stadium; Reno, NV		W 49–10	9,113
December 22	1:30 p.m.	at New Mexico*	University Stadium; Albuquerque, NM (New Mexico Bowl)	ESPN	L 0–23	30,223
*Non-conference game; ^{†}Homecoming; Rankings from AP Poll released prior to the game; All times are in Pacific time

== Game summaries ==
=== At Nebraska ===
Nevada at Nebraska

Team	1	2	3	4	Total
Wolf Pack	0	10	0	0	10
• No. 20 Cornhuskers	7	14	24	7	52

- Date: September 1, 2007
- Location: Memorial Stadium
  Lincoln, NE
- Game start: 2:36 p.m. CDT
- Elapsed time: 3 hours and 33 minutes
- Game attendance: 84,078
- Game weather: Temperature: 81 °F (27 °C) • Weather: Sunny and 51% Humidity • Wind: S 9 MPH
- Referee: Cooper Castleberry
- TV announcers (ABC): Dan Fouts, Tim Brant and Todd Harris (sideline)

Scoring summary
1	04:16	NU	Marlon Lucky 16–yard pass from Sam Keller (Alex Henery kick)	NU 7–0
2	13:58	NEV	Brett Jaekle 36–yard field goal	NU 7–3
2	10:53	NEV	Jonathon Amaya 80–yard interception (Brett Jaekle kick)	NEV 10–7
2	06:40	NU	Marlon Lucky 1–yard run (Alex Henery kick)	NU 14–10
2	02:22	NU	Quentin Castille 1–yard run (Alex Henery kick)	NU 21–10
3	11:30	NU	Marlon Lucky 17–yard run (Alex Henery kick)	NU 28–10
3	08:59	NU	Marlon Lucky 3–yard run (Alex Henery kick)	NU 35–10
3	04:45	NU	Adi Kunalic 46–yard field goal	NU 38–10
3	00:50	NU	Quentin Castille 2–yard run (Alex Henery kick)	NU 45–10
4	08:31	NU	Major Culbert 17–yard run (Alex Henery kick)	NU 52–10

=== At Northwestern ===
Nevada at Northwestern

Team	1	2	3	4	Total
Wolf Pack	7	17	0	7	31
• Wildcats	7	3	10	16	36

- Date: September 8, 2007
- Location: Ryan Field
  Evanston, IL
- Game start: 11:07 a.m. CDT
- Elapsed time: 3 hours and 47 minutes
- Game attendance: 17,653
- Game weather: Temperature: 77 °F (25 °C) • Weather: Sunny • Wind: SE 5 MPH
- Referee: Bill McCabe
- TV announcers (BTN): Scott Graham and Derrick Walker

Scoring summary
1	10:27	NW	Tonjua Jones 1–yard pass from C.J. Bacher (Amado Villarreal kick)	NW 7–0
1	07:12	NEV	Brandon Fragger 14–yard run (Brett Jaekle kick)	TIE 7–7
2	12:52	NEV	Adam Bishop 24–yard pass from Nick Graziano (Brett Jaekle kick)	NEV 14–7
2	02:26	NEV	Brett Jaekle 37–yard field goal	NEV 17–7
2	00:47	NW	Amado Villarreal 46–yard field goal	NEV 17–10
2	00:00	NEV	Kyle Sammons 48–yard pass from Nick Graziano (Brett Jaekle kick)	NEV 24–10
3	11:18	NW	Amado Villarreal 29–yard field goal	NEV 24–13
3	06:56	NW	Brandon Roberson 1–yard run (Amado Villarreal kick)	NEV 24–20
4	11:14	NW	Omar Conteh 16–yard pass from C.J. Bacher (Amado Villarreal kick)	NW 27–24
4	03:38	NEV	Luke Lippincott 27–yard run (Brett Jaekle kick)	NEV 31–27
4	00:21	NW	Ross Lane 13–yard pass from C.J. Bacher (Amado Villarreal kick)	NW 34–31
4	00:00	NW	Kevin Mims 3–yard safety	NW 36–31

=== Nicholls State ===
Nicholls State at Nevada

Team	1	2	3	4	Total
Colonels (Div. I FCS)	10	0	7	0	17
• Wolf Pack	0	31	14	7	52

- Date: September 15, 2007
- Location: Mackay Stadium
  Reno, NV
- Game start: 6:07 p.m. PDT
- Elapsed time: 3 hours and 23 minutes
- Game attendance: 15,233
- Game weather: Temperature: 60 °F (16 °C) • Weather: N/A • Wind: 5–10 MPH
- Referee: Drew George
- TV announcers (ESPN+): Dave Weekley and Jay Thomas

Scoring summary
1	06:53	NICH	Alex Romero 32–yard field goal	NICH 3–0
1	00:18	NICH	Zack Morgan 42–yard run (Alex Romero kick)	NICH 10–0
2	12:05	NEV	Brett Jaekle 45–yard field goal	NICH 10–3
2	06:47	NEV	Adam Bishop 25–yard pass from Nick Graziano (Brett Jaekle kick)	TIE 10–10
2	05:08	NEV	Luke Lippincott 16–yard run (Brett Jaekle kick)	NEV 17–10
2	02:36	NEV	Marko Mitchell 49–yard pass from Nick Graziano (Brett Jaekle kick)	NEV 24–10
2	00:58	NEV	Arthur King Jr. 52–yard pass from Nick Graziano (Brett Jaekle kick)	NEV 31–10
3	10:49	NEV	Adam Bishop 17–yard pass from Nick Graziano (Brett Jaekle kick)	NEV 38–10
3	08:24	NICH	Broderick Cole 14–yard run (Alex Romero kick)	NEV 38–17
3	01:17	NEV	Adam Bishop 4–yard pass from Nick Graziano (Brett Jaekle kick)	NEV 45–17
4	06:29	NEV	Courtney Randall 1–yard run (Brett Jaekle kick)	NEV 52–17

=== UNLV ===
UNLV at Nevada
(Battle for the Fremont Cannon)

Team	1	2	3	4	Total
Rebels	3	0	7	10	20
• Wolf Pack	10	0	0	17	27

- Date: September 29, 2007
- Location: Mackay Stadium
  Reno, NV
- Game start: 1:05 p.m. PDT
- Elapsed time: 3 hours and 18 minutes
- Game attendance: 25,278
- Game weather: Temperature: 59 °F (15 °C) • Weather: Clear • Wind: N 6 MPH
- Referee: Rich Kollen
- TV announcers (None): None

Scoring summary
1	10:22	UNLV	Sergio Aguayo 22–yard field goal	UNLV 3–0
1	03:50	NEV	Brett Jaekle 50–yard field goal	TIE 3–3
1	01:02	NEV	Mike McCoy 90–yard pass from Nick Graziano (Brett Jaekle kick)	NEV 10–3
3	05:23	UNLV	Frank Summers 6–yard run (Sergio Aguayo kick)	TIE 10–10
4	13:24	UNLV	Sergio Aguayo 42–yard field goal	UNLV 13–10
4	08:54	NEV	Brett Jaekle 30–yard field goal	TIE 13–13
4	03:02	NEV	Adam Bishop 15–yard pass from Nick Graziano (Brett Jaekle kick)	NEV 20–13
4	01:02	UNLV	Ryan Wolfe 30–yard pass from Travis Dixon (Sergio Aguayo kick)	TIE 20–20
4	00:27	NEV	Kyle Sammons 43–yard pass from Nick Graziano (Brett Jaekle kick)	NEV 27–20

=== Fresno State ===
Fresno State at Nevada

Team	1	2	3	4	Total
• Bulldogs	14	14	14	7	49
Wolf Pack	3	10	7	21	41

- Date: October 6, 2007
- Location: Mackay Stadium
  Reno, NV
- Game start: 1:07 p.m. PDT
- Elapsed time: 3 hours and 43 minutes
- Game attendance: 18,503
- Game weather: Temperature: 46 °F (8 °C) • Weather: Clear • Wind: Calm
- Referee: Gerald Wright
- TV announcers (None): None

Scoring summary
1	12:48	NEV	Brett Jaekle 22–yard field goal	NEV 3–0
1	09:09	FS	Ryan Mathews 3–yard run (Clint Stitser kick)	FS 7–3
1	08:10	FS	Clifton Smith 67–yard punt return (Clint Stitser kick)	FS 14–3
2	12:05	NEV	Brett Jaekle 36–yard field goal	FS 14–6
2	05:22	NEV	Marko Mitchell 9–yard pass from Colin Kaepernick (Brett Jaekle kick)	FS 14–13
2	05:04	FS	Ryan Mathews 54–yard run (Clint Stitser kick)	FS 21–13
2	01:45	FS	A. J. Jefferson 40–yard blocked field goal return (Clint Stitser kick)	FS 28–13
3	14:42	FS	Ryan Mathews 67–yard run (Clint Stitser kick)	FS 35–13
3	09:00	NEV	Brandon Fragger 10–yard pass from Colin Kaepernick (Brett Jaekle kick)	FS 35–20
3	02:36	FS	Clifton Smith 15–yard run (Clint Stitser kick)	FS 42–20
4	12:35	FS	Lonyae Miller 72–yard run (Clint Stitser kick)	FS 49–20
4	06:22	NEV	Colin Kaepernick 3–yard run (Brett Jaekle kick)	FS 49–27
4	00:29	NEV	Luke Lippincott 36–yard pass from Colin Kaepernick (Brett Jaekle kick)	FS 49–34
4	00:03	NEV	Adam Bishop 34–yard pass from Colin Kaepernick (Brett Jaekle kick)	FS 49–41

=== At Boise State ===
Nevada at Boise State
(rivalry)

Team	1	2	3	4	OT	Total
Wolf Pack	7	14	7	16	23	67
• Broncos	7	21	3	13	25	69

- Date: October 14, 2007
- Location: Bronco Stadium
  Boise, ID
- Game start: 6:02 p.m. MDT
- Elapsed time: 3 hours and 56 minutes
- Game attendance: 30,394
- Game weather: Temperature: 70 °F (21 °C) • Weather: Sunny • Wind: Calm
- Referee: Frank White
- TV announcers (ESPN): Eric Collins, Bill Curry and Dave Ryan (sideline)

Scoring summary
1	11:39	BSU	Jeremy Avery 9–yard run (Kyle Brotzman kick)	BSU 7–0
1	01:10	NEV	Junior Puloka 16–yard pass from Colin Kaepernick (Brett Jaekle kick)	TIE 7–7
2	14:25	BSU	Ian Johnson 72–yard run (Kyle Brotzman kick)	BSU 14–7
2	06:05	BSU	Ryan Putnam 33–yard pass from Tanyon Bissell (Kyle Brotzman kick)	BSU 21–7
2	04:27	NEV	Luke Lippincott 1–yard run (Brett Jaekle kick)	BSU 21–14
2	02:33	BSU	Sherman Blaser 25–yard pass from Taylor Tharp (Kyle Brotzman kick)	BSU 28–14
2	01:15	NEV	Marko Mitchell 58–yard pass from Colin Kaepernick (Brett Jaekle kick)	BSU 28–21
3	12:52	NEV	Luke Lippincott 5–yard run (Brett Jaekle kick)	TIE 28–28
3	08:01	BSU	Kyle Brotzman 40–yard field goal	BSU 31–28
4	13:18	BSU	Kyle Brotzman 31–yard field goal	BSU 34–28
4	12:03	NEV	Mike McCoy 41–yard pass from Colin Kaepernick (Brett Jaekle kick blocked)	TIE 34–34
4	10:37	BSU	Ian Johnson 32–yard pass from Taylor Tharp (Kyle Brotzman kick)	BSU 41–34
4	10:12	NEV	Colin Kaepernick 9–yard run (Brett Jaekle kick)	TIE 41–41
4	03:40	NEV	Brett Jaekle 35–yard field goal	NEV 44–41
4	00:00	BSU	Kyle Brotzman 27–yard field goal	TIE 44–44
OT	00:00	NEV	Luke Lippincott 25–yard run (Brett Jaekle kick)	NEV 51–44
OT	00:00	BSU	Sherman Blaser 25–yard pass from Taylor Tharp (Kyle Brotzman kick)	TIE 51–51
OT	00:00	BSU	Jeremy Childs 25–yard pass from Taylor Tharp (Kyle Brotzman kick)	BSU 58–51
OT	00:00	NEV	Colin Kaepernick 25–yard run (Brett Jaekle kick)	TIE 58–58
OT	00:00	NEV	Brett Jaekle 27–yard field goal	NEV 61–58
OT	00:00	BSU	Kyle Brotzman 29–yard field goal	TIE 61–61
OT	00:00	BSU	Ian Johnson 1–yard run (Jeremy Avery pass)	BSU 69–61
OT	00:00	NEV	Luke Lippincott 7–yard run (Colin Kaepernick pass failed)	BSU 69–67

=== At Utah State ===
Nevada at Utah State

Team	1	2	3	4	Total
• Wolf Pack	14	0	10	7	31
Aggies	7	14	0	7	28

- Date: October 20, 2007
- Location: Romney Stadium
  Logan, UT
- Game start: 1:07 p.m. MDT
- Elapsed time: 3 hours and 2 minutes
- Game attendance: 9,462
- Game weather: Temperature: 36 °F (2 °C) • Weather: Cold, Rain and Snow flurry • Wind: SW 7 MPH
- Referee: Drew George
- TV announcers (KAME-TV/CSNW): Dan Gustin and Chris Vargas

Scoring summary
1	08:38	NEV	Marko Mitchell 31–yard pass from Colin Kaepernick (Brett Jaekle kick)	NEV 7–0
1	06:32	NEV	Luke Lippincott 7–yard run (Brett Jaekle kick)	NEV 14–0
1	00:53	USU	Leon Jackson III 1–yard run (Peter Caldwell kick)	NEV 14–7
2	03:37	USU	Derrvin Speight 12–yard run (Peter Caldwell kick)	TIE 14–14
2	02:19	USU	Kevin Robinson 70–yard punt return (Peter Caldwell kick)	USU 21–14
3	09:26	NEV	Luke Lippincott 8–yard run (Brett Jaekle kick)	TIE 21–21
3	02:43	NEV	Brett Jaekle 24–yard field goal	NEV 24–21
4	14:15	USU	Leon Jackson III 10–yard run (Peter Caldwell kick)	USU 28–24
4	07:18	NEV	Mike McCoy 32–yard pass from Colin Kaepernick (Brett Jaekle kick)	NEV 31–28

=== Idaho ===
Idaho at Nevada

Team	1	2	3	4	Total
Vandals	0	7	7	7	21
• Wolf Pack	17	0	0	20	37

- Date: October 27, 2007
- Location: Mackay Stadium
  Reno, NV
- Game start: 1:07 p.m. PDT
- Elapsed time: 3 hours and 8 minutes
- Game attendance: 11,960
- Game weather: Temperature: 63 °F (17 °C) • Weather: Partly Sunny • Wind: Calm
- Referee: Bill Athan
- TV announcers (None): None

Scoring summary
1	10:49	NEV	Luke Lippincott 1–yard run (Brett Jaekle kick)	NEV 7–0
1	03:55	NEV	Brett Jaekle 37–yard field goal	NEV 10–0
1	02:56	NEV	Ezra Butler 11–yard interception (Brett Jaekle kick)	NEV 17–0
2	10:59	IDAHO	Peter Jorvik 10–yard pass from Nathan Enderle (Tino Amancio kick)	NEV 17–7
3	12:26	IDAHO	Eric Greenwood 18–yard pass from Nathan Enderle (Tino Amancio kick)	NEV 17–14
4	10:01	NEV	Luke Lippincott 2–yard run (Brett Jaekle kick)	NEV 24–14
4	04:22	NEV	Marko Mitchell 28–yard pass from Colin Kaepernick (Brett Jaekle kick)	NEV 31–14
4	02:20	IDAHO	Deonte Jackson 1–yard run (Tino Amanico kick)	NEV 31–21
4	00:10	NEV	Vai Taua 11–yard run (Brett Jaekle kick failed)	NEV 37–21

=== At New Mexico State ===
Nevada at New Mexico State

Team	1	2	3	4	Total
• Wolf Pack	6	14	0	20	40
Aggies	0	10	14	14	38

- Date: November 2, 2007
- Location: Aggie Memorial Stadium
  Las Cruces, NM
- Game start: 6:04 p.m. MDT
- Elapsed time: 3 hours and 45 minutes
- Game attendance: 12,268
- Game weather: Temperature: 75 °F (24 °C) • Weather: Clear • Wind: SE 2 MPH
- Referee: Frank White
- TV announcers (ESPN2): Sean McDonough, Chris Spielman and Rob Stone (sideline)

Scoring summary
1	07:19	NEV	Brett Jaekle 34–yard field goal	NEV 3–0
1	03:42	NEV	Brett Jaekle 41–yard field goal	NEV 6–0
2	08:09	NEV	Adam Bishop 5–yard pass from Colin Kaepernick (Brett Jaekle kick)	NEV 13–0
2	03:25	NMSU	Paul Young 37–yard field goal	NEV 13–3
2	01:57	NEV	Marko Mitchell 64–yard pass from Colin Kaepernick (Brett Jaekle kick)	NEV 20–3
2	00:32	NMSU	Tonny Glynn 6–yard run (Paul Young kick)	NEV 20–10
3	07:25	NMSU	Kenneth Buckley 35–yard pass from Chase Holbrook (Paul Young kick)	NEV 20–17
3	00:46	NMSU	A.J. Harris 8–yard pass from Chase Holbrook (Paul Young kick)	NMSU 24–20
4	14:47	NEV	Colin Kaepernick 31–yard run (Brett Jaekle kick)	NEV 27–24
4	10:06	NMSU	Kenneth Buckley 25–yard pass from Chase Holbrook (Paul Young kick)	NMSU 31–27
4	07:13	NEV	Colin Kaepernick 35–yard run (Brett Jaekle kick)	NEV 34–31
4	03:38	NMSU	A.J. Harris 32–yard pass from Chase Holbrook (Paul Young kick)	NMSU 38–34
4	01:00	NEV	Mike McCoy 31–yard pass from Colin Kaepernick (Brett Jaekle kick failed)	NEV 40–38

=== Hawaii ===
Hawaii at Nevada

Team	1	2	3	4	Total
• Warriors	5	14	0	9	28
Wolf Pack	0	10	10	6	26

- Date: November 16, 2007
- Location: Mackay Stadium
  Reno, NV
- Game start: 8:07 p.m. PST
- Elapsed time: 3 hours and 36 minutes
- Game attendance: 22,437
- Game weather: Temperature: 56 °F (13 °C) • Weather: Partly Cloudy • Wind: 5–10 MPH
- Referee: Bill McCabe
- TV announcers (ESPN2): Sean McDonough, Chris Spielman and Rob Stone (sideline)

Scoring summary
1	09:27	UH	Dan Kelly 45–yard field goal	UH 3–0
1	03:24	UH	David Veikune 3–yard safety	UH 5–0
2	14:57	UH	Jason Rivers 3–yard pass from Tyler Graunke (Dan Kelly kick)	UH 12–0
2	13:13	NEV	Luke Lippincott 22–yard pass from Colin Kaepernick (Brett Jaekle kick)	UH 12–7
2	05:13	UH	Tyler Graunke 7–yard run (Dan Kelly kick)	UH 19–7
2	00:53	NEV	Brett Jaekle 41–yard field goal	UH 19–10
3	12:43	NEV	Brett Jaekle 42–yard field goal	UH 19–13
3	02:43	NEV	Colin Kaepernick 3–yard run (Brett Jaekle kick)	NEV 20–19
4	13:35	UH	Ryan Grice-Mullen 22–yard pass from Tyler Graunke (pass failed)	UH 25–19
4	08:27	NEV	Luke Lippincott 5–yard run (Colin Kaepernick pass failed)	NEV 26–25
4	00:11	UH	Dan Kelly 45–yard field goal	UH 28–26

=== At San Jose State ===
Nevada at San Jose State

Team	1	2	3	4	Total
Wolf Pack	7	17	0	0	24
• Spartans	7	3	7	10	27

- Date: November 24, 2007
- Location: Spartan Stadium
  San Jose, CA
- Game start: 1:07 p.m. PST
- Elapsed time: 3 hours and 30 minutes
- Game attendance: 12,678
- Game weather: Temperature: 64 °F (18 °C) • Weather: Partly Cloudy • Wind: NW 3 MPH
- Referee: Drew George
- TV announcers (KAME-TV/NSN): Dan Gustin and Chris Vargas

Scoring summary
1	06:13	SJSU	Kevin Jurovich 33–yard pass from Adam Tafralis (Jared Strubeck kick)	SJSU 7–0
1	03:27	NEV	Marko Mitchell 64–yard pass from Colin Kaepernick (Brett Jaekle kick)	TIE 7–7
2	09:14	NEV	Brandon Fragger 9–yard run (Brett Jaekle kick)	NEV 14–7
2	06:29	SJSU	Jared Strubeck 20–yard field goal	NEV 14–10
2	03:21	NEV	Marko Mitchell 59–yard pass from Colin Kaepernick (Brett Jaekle kick)	NEV 21–10
2	00:00	NEV	Brett Jaekle 36–yard field goal	NEV 24–10
3	07:08	SJSU	Brian Elledge 3–yard pass from Adam Tafralis (Jared Strubeck kick)	NEV 24–17
4	14:47	SJSU	Jared Strubeck 39–yard field goal	NEV 24–20
4	11:42	SJSU	Jacob French 13–yard run (Jared Strubeck kick)	SJSU 27–24

=== Louisiana Tech ===
Louisiana Tech at Nevada

Team	1	2	3	4	Total
Bulldogs	0	3	7	0	10
• Wolf Pack	14	7	21	7	49

- Date: December 1, 2007
- Location: Mackay Stadium
  Reno, NV
- Game start: 1:05 p.m. PST
- Elapsed time: 3 hours and 3 minutes
- Game attendance: 9,113
- Game weather: Temperature: 41 °F (5 °C) • Weather: Clear • Wind: W 15–20 MPH
- Referee: Bill Athan
- TV announcers (None): None

Scoring summary
1	12:49	NEV	Luke Lippincott 1–yard run (Brett Jaekle kick)	NEV 7–0
1	02:03	NEV	Kyle Sammons 16–yard pass from Colin Kaepernick (Brett Jaekle kick)	NEV 14–0
2	05:38	NEV	Luke Lippincott 1–yard run (Brett Jaekle kick)	NEV 21–0
2	01:42	LATECH	Danny Horwedel 20–yard field goal	NEV 21–3
3	13:25	NEV	Kyle Sammons 74–yard pass from Colin Kaepernick (Brett Jaekle kick)	NEV 28–3
3	07:45	NEV	Luke Lippincott 3–yard run (Brett Jaekle kick)	NEV 35–3
3	03:01	NEV	Luke Lippincott 1–yard run (Brett Jaekle kick)	NEV 42–3
3	02:50	LATECH	Phillip Livas 78–yard kickoff return (Danny Horwedel kick)	NEV 42–10
4	13:27	NEV	Luke Lippincott 11–yard pass from Colin Kaepernick (Brett Jaekle kick)	NEV 49–10

=== At New Mexico ===
Nevada at New Mexico
(New Mexico Bowl)

Team	1	2	3	4	Total
Wolf Pack	0	0	0	0	0
• Lobos	14	6	0	3	23

- Date: December 22, 2007
- Location: University Stadium
  Albuquerque, NM
- Game start: 2:36 p.m. MST
- Elapsed time: 3 hours and 17 minutes
- Game attendance: 30,223
- Game weather: Temperature: 34 °F (1 °C) • Weather: 0% Chance of Precipitation • Wind: WSW 7 MPH
- Referee: Greg Burks
- TV announcers (ESPN): Dave Barnett, Rod Gilmore and Dave Ryan (sideline)

Scoring summary
1	13:38	NM	Marcus Smith 66–yard pass from Donovan Porterie (John Sullivan kick)	NM 7–0
1	02:22	NM	Travis Brown 39–yard pass from Donovan Porterie (John Sullivan kick)	NM 14–0
2	06:07	NM	John Sullivan 53–yard field goal	NM 17–0
2	02:48	NM	John Sullivan 45–yard field goal	NM 20–0
4	04:18	NM	John Sullivan 37–yard field goal	NM 23–0
