= Alex Romero (disambiguation) =

Alex Romero is a baseball outfielder.

Alex Romero may also refer to:

- Alex Romero (American football)
- Alex Romero (choreographer)
- Alex Romero (character), a character from House of Cards
