= Arthur Stephenson =

Arthur Stephenson may refer to:

- Sir Arthur George Stephenson (1890–1967), Australian architect
- Art Stephenson (born 1942), director of the NASA Marshall Space Flight Center

== See also ==
- Art Stevenson (1916–2000), American football running back
