= Narbonne High School =

Public high school in Harbor City, California

Location
- 24300 S Western Ave; Harbor City, California 90710; United States; 33.8032°N 118.3054°W

Information
- Type: Public
- Motto: Domus Victorum (Home of the Victors)
- Established: 1925
- School district: Los Angeles Unified School District
- Dean: James Collins, Corwin Twine
- Principal: Andrew Kasek
- Staff: 79.91 (FTE)
- Grades: 9–12
- Enrollment: 1,549 (2024–2025)
- Student to teacher ratio: 19.38
- Colors: Green, Gold
- Athletics conference: Marine League; CIF Los Angeles City Section
- Mascot: Gaucho
- Communities served: Harbor City; Lomita, Torrance
- Feeder schools: Fleming Middle, White Middle
- Website: narbonnehs.lausd.org

Nathaniel Narbonne High School (NHS) is a school located at 24300 South Western Avenue, in the Harbor City area of Los Angeles, California. Narbonne serves grades 9 through 12 and is part of the Los Angeles Unified School District. Narbonne serves the Harbor City area and the city of Lomita.

The school motto is "Domus Victorum" which means "Home of the Victors." Narbonne's colors are green and gold. The school's mascot is the Gaucho, which is often regarded as an Argentinian cowboy. The official fight song for the high school is "Onward Narbonne!" which is a variation of "On, Wisconsin!" – the official state song of Wisconsin as well as the fight song of the University of Wisconsin–Madison.

== History ==
Narbonne dates back to 1925. The school was named for Nathaniel A. Narbonne, a sheep rancher, who owned most of the land in the Lomita and Harbor City area. The original building, from when Narbonne covered 7th through 12 grades, is in Lomita, and is now Alexander Fleming Middle School. In 1957, the new school was built on the present site at 242nd Place and Western Avenue.

=== 1995 killing of Shazeb Andleeb ===
In May 1995 Shazeb Andleeb, a 17-year-old student of Pakistani descent, was killed by several other students in a hallway at Narbonne High School. The incident is referred to in the track "The Last Stand of Shazeb Andleeb" on the 1996 album The Cult of Ray by Black Francis, who attended Narbonne in the early 1980s.

== Academics ==
=== Enrollment ===
As of the school year 2021–22, there were a total of 1,795 students attending the high school.

- Hispanic or Latino - 68.1% (1,222)
- Black - 19% (341)
- White - 3.6% (64)
- Filipino - 3.5% (62)
- Asian - 2.8% (51)
- Pacific Islander - 1.3% (24)
- Other/Unreported - 1.7% (31)

== Notable alumni ==
- Antwan Applewhite – NFL linebacker, Carolina Panthers, class of 2003
- Nnamdi Asomugha, All-Pro NFL cornerback, Oakland Raiders, Philadelphia Eagles, actor, producer
- Marc Brown – television news anchor, KABC-TV Los Angeles
- Bobby Brooks – professional baseball player
- Larry Carlton – jazz guitarist
- Rod Craig – former Major League Baseball player
- Major Culbert – football player
- Jeff Dedmon – former Major League Baseball pitcher
- B. B. Dickerson – bass player and vocalist with the band War
- Dashon Goldson – NFL Pro Bowl free safety, Tampa Bay Buccaneers
- Tom Graham – defensive linebacker for Denver Broncos
- Ebony Hoffman – WNBA center Indiana Fever, class of 2000
- Imani – hip-hop artist; founding member of The Pharcyde, class of 1989
- Jermar Jefferson – running back for the Detroit Lions
- Diana Lee Inosanto – film director, writer, producer, actress, stuntwoman, and martial artist, class of 1984
- Mat Kaplan – Planetary Society host, presenter. class of 1971
- Daddy Kev – music producer and engineer, class of 1992
- James Lesure – television actor, class of 1988
- Roy Lewis – NFL cornerback, Seattle Seahawks
- Brandon Manumaleuna – NFL tight end, San Diego Chargers
- John Mizuno – member of the Hawaii House of Representatives (2006–present), class of 1982
- Loree Moore – WNBA Guard and Captain, New York Liberty
- Denise Nakano – news anchor and reporter for NBC 10 News (WCAU, Philadelphia), class of 1992
- Stephen L. Neal – United States congressman representing North Carolina 1975–1995, class of 1952
- Uchenna Nwosu – NFL outside linebacker, Seattle Seahawks, Super Bowl LX Champion
- Paul Pettit – pitcher, Pittsburgh Pirates, Major League Baseball's first $100,000 signing bonus, Class of 1950
- Joe Puerta – member of rock bands Ambrosia and Bruce Hornsby and the Range, Class of 1969
- Chad Qualls – former Major League Baseball player
- Jonathan McKenzi Smith – NFL running back
- Art Stephenson – director of NASA's Marshall Space Flight Center, 1998–2003
- Richard Tapia - American mathematician and academic, class of 1956
- Edward O. Thorp – author of Beat The Dealer, the original study of card counting in blackjack, class of 1949
- Lisa Willis – WNBA guard, New York Liberty
- Jessica Williams – actress and comedian on The Daily Show, class of 2007
- Jacob Wysocki – actor and comedian, class of 2008

Attended but did not graduate from Narbonne

- Steve Lacy – musician
- Dale Atkeson – NFL fullback, Washington Redskins, 1954–1956
- Frank Black (Charles Michael Kittridge Thompson IV) – musician, Pixies lead singer
- Bo Derek (Mary Cathleen Collins) – movie actress (10) and supermodel
- Rick Griffin – artist and illustrator
- Amir Johnson – NBA forward for the Toronto Raptors. Graduated from Westchester High School in Los Angeles and entered the 2005 NBA draft upon graduation. He was chosen 56th overall by the Detroit Pistons.
- Bill Sharman – NBA 8-time All-Star and 4-time champion with the Boston Celtics. Head coach, Los Angeles Lakers 1971–76, NBA Champions 1972, including the longest winning streak in the history of the NBA and in American major professional team sports (33 games).
- Bill Stits – UCLA alumnus, NFL player
- Quentin Tarantino – film director, actor.
- Douglas Christopher Judge – actor, played Teal'c in the television series Stargate SG-1. (Graduate of Carson High School, class of 1982.)

== In media ==
Narbonne has been a filming location for the following movies:

- Trippin'
