= Art Stephenson =

NASA personnel

Arthur G. Stephenson
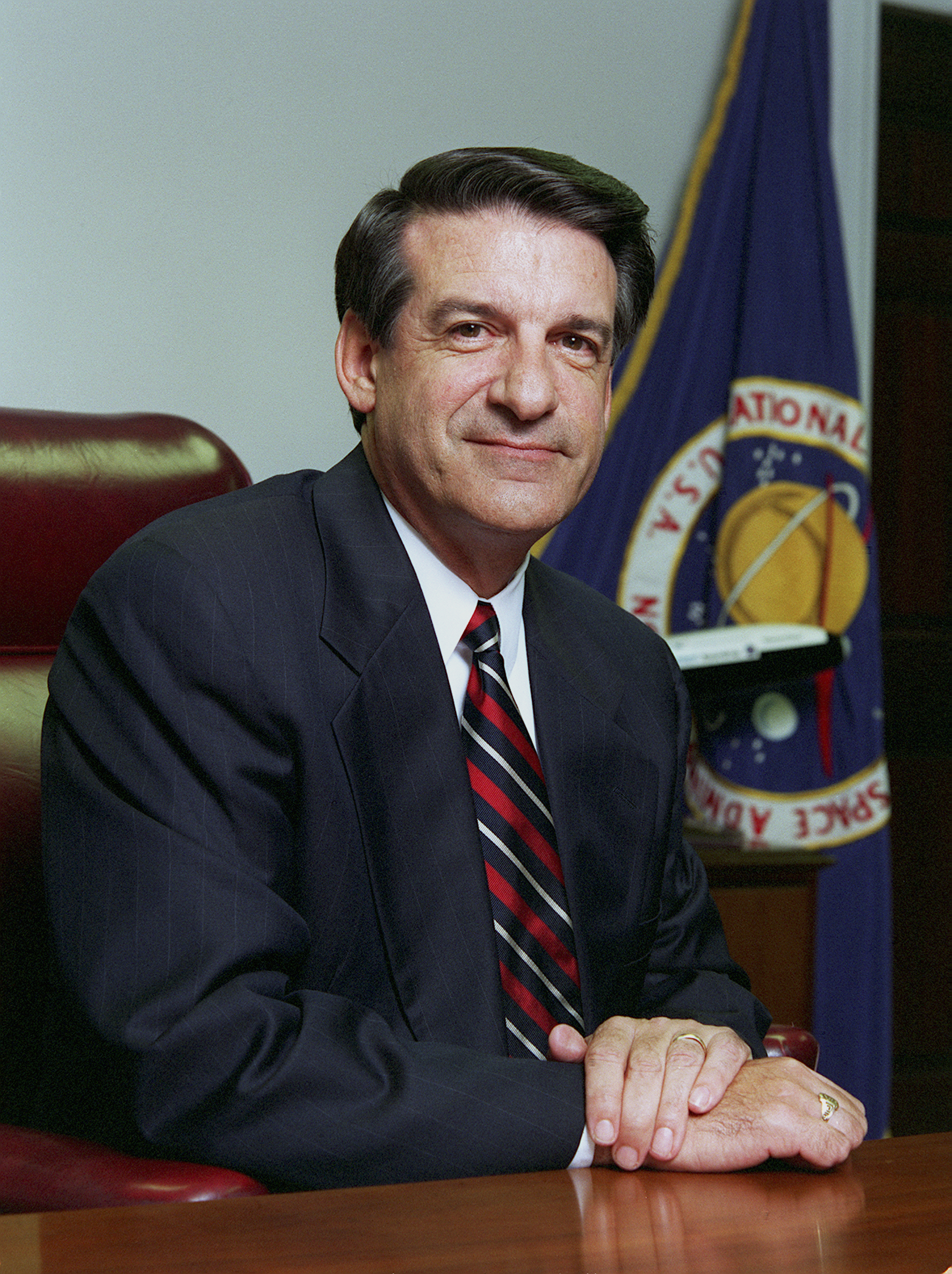
- Official NASA portrait of Art Stephenson
- Born: 1942 (age 83–84); New London, Connecticut
- Education: Bachelor's degree in electrical engineering at University of Redlands, Executive Program in Management at UCLA's John E. Anderson Graduate School of Management
- Occupations: Director of the Marshall Space Flight Center
- Spouse: Loa Stephenson

Arthur G. Stephenson (born 1942) was the ninth Director of the NASA Marshall Space Flight Center located in Huntsville, Alabama. He served as director from September 11, 1998, to May 2003.

== Early years ==
Stephenson was born in New London, Connecticut, and finished his secondary schooling by graduating from Narbonne High School in Harbor City, California.

== Education ==
- A graduate of Narbonne High School in Harbor City, California (Los Angeles City Schools)
- He attended University of Redlands in Redlands, California, obtaining a Bachelor of Science degree in electrical engineering.
- In later years, he completed the Executive Program in Management given by UCLA's John E. Anderson Graduate School of Management.

== Career ==
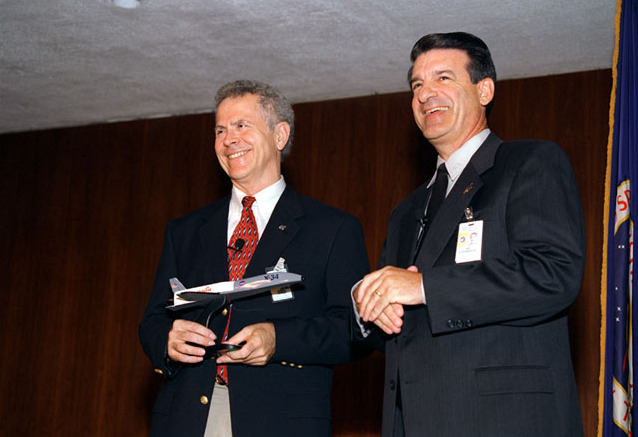
Author Homer Hickam Jr. (left) and Marshall Space Flight Center Director Art Stephenson during a conference at Morris Auditorium on July 16, 1999.

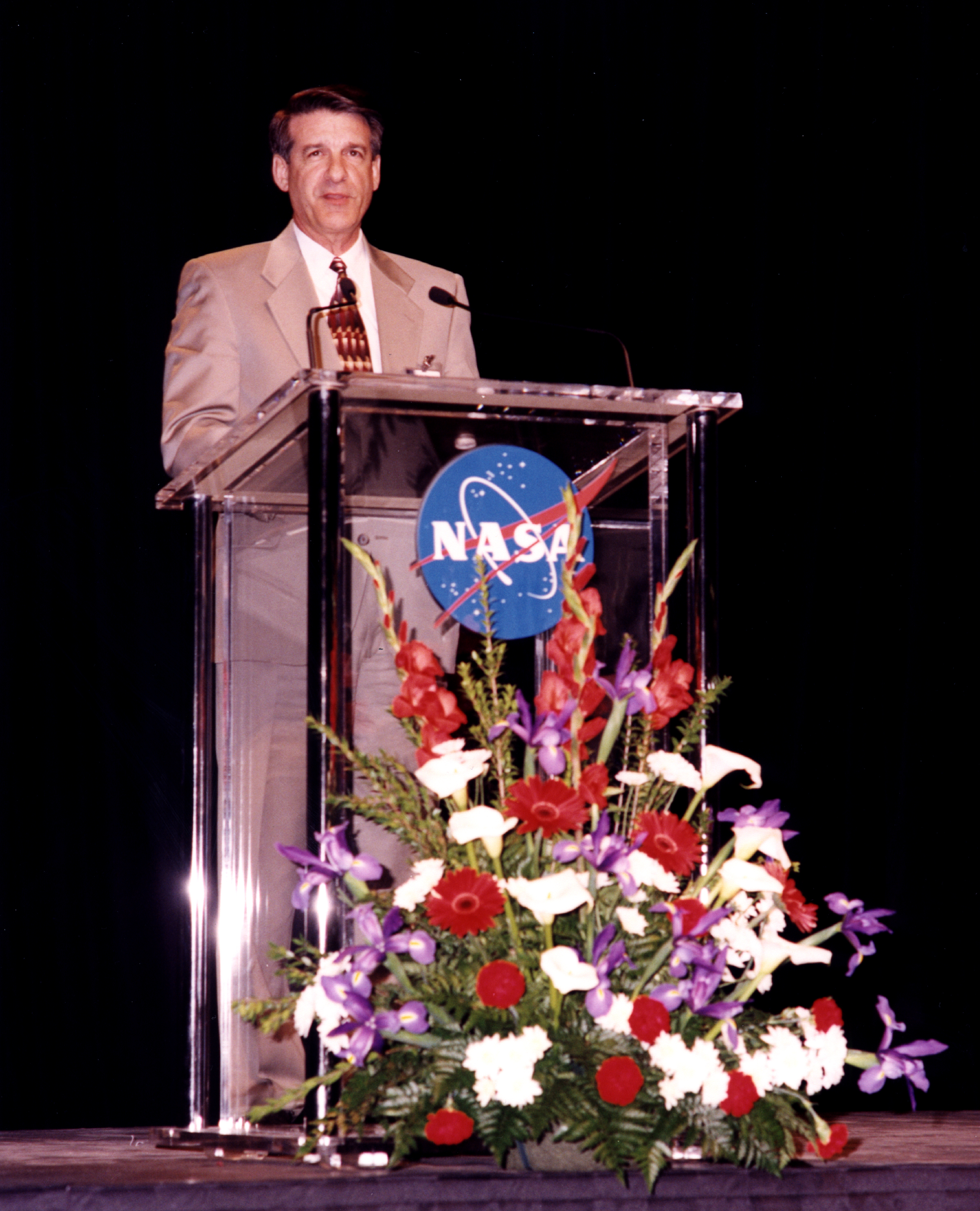
NASA Marshall Space Flight Center Director Arthur Stephenson speaks at the X-34 rollout ceremony on April 30, 1999.

- Worked for TRW in Redondo Beach, California, for 28 years from 1964 to 1992 starting with Apollo program, followed by Pioneer 10 and included work on many Space Shuttle related programs including development of the S-Band Communications Transponder.
- Worked for Oceaneering Inc. in Houston, Texas, as Vice President of Space Systems and then President of Oceaneering Advanced Technologies from 1992 to 1998.
- Worked for NASA in Huntsville, Alabama, from September, 1998 to June 2003 as Director of NASA's Marshall Space Flight Center (MSFC).
- As Director of MSFC Stephenson oversaw the Shuttle Space Transportation System propulsion elements including the Orbiter Main Engines, Solid Rocket Motors, and External Tank.
- Other programs at MSFC during his tenor included Advanced Space Transportation development programs X-33, X-34, X-37, and Space Launch Initiative, International Space Station programs Element Structural Testing, Standard Rack development, and waste water recycling development, Microgravity Science experiment development and operations, the Chandra X-Ray Observatory development and on-orbit operations, and the Gravity Probe B spacecraft development oversight.
- Served as Chairman of the Mars '98 Orbiter Failure Investigation Board and testified before the U.S. Senate.
- NASA MSFC's annual budget during his tenor averaged about 2.3 Billion dollars.
- Worked at Northrop Grumman from 2004 to 2008 as Vice President of Laser Programs, then Executive Vice President of Human Space Programs and then Executive Vice President and Deputy Program Manager of the NPOESS program.
- Worked as President of Stephenson Consulting LLC. from 2008 to 2015 consulting for various Aerospace Companies.
- Retired full time in 2015.
- Published Autobiography in 2019 titled "Out of The Blue" available from Amazon in paperback or e-book format. Also available from sifat.org.
