= Lydon Murtha =

American football player (born 1985)

No. 76
- Position: Offensive tackle

Personal information
- Born: November 13, 1985 (age 40); Hutchinson, Minnesota, U.S.
- Listed height: 6 ft 7 in (2.01 m)
- Listed weight: 315 lb (143 kg)

Career information
- High school: Hutchinson
- College: Nebraska
- NFL draft: 2009: 7th round, 228th overall pick

Career history
- Detroit Lions (2009)*; Miami Dolphins (2009–2011)
- * Offseason or practice squad member only

Career NFL statistics
- Games played: 9
- Games started: 4
- Stats at Pro Football Reference

Lydon J. Murtha (born November 13, 1985) is an American former professional football player who was an offensive tackle in the National Football League (NFL). He was selected by the Detroit Lions in the seventh round of the 2009 NFL draft. He played college football for the Nebraska Cornhuskers.

== Professional career ==
Murtha was signed off the Lions practice squad by the Miami Dolphins in October 2009. He was placed on injured reserve after the 2011 preseason with an undisclosed injury.
