= Zach Potter =

American football player (born 1986)

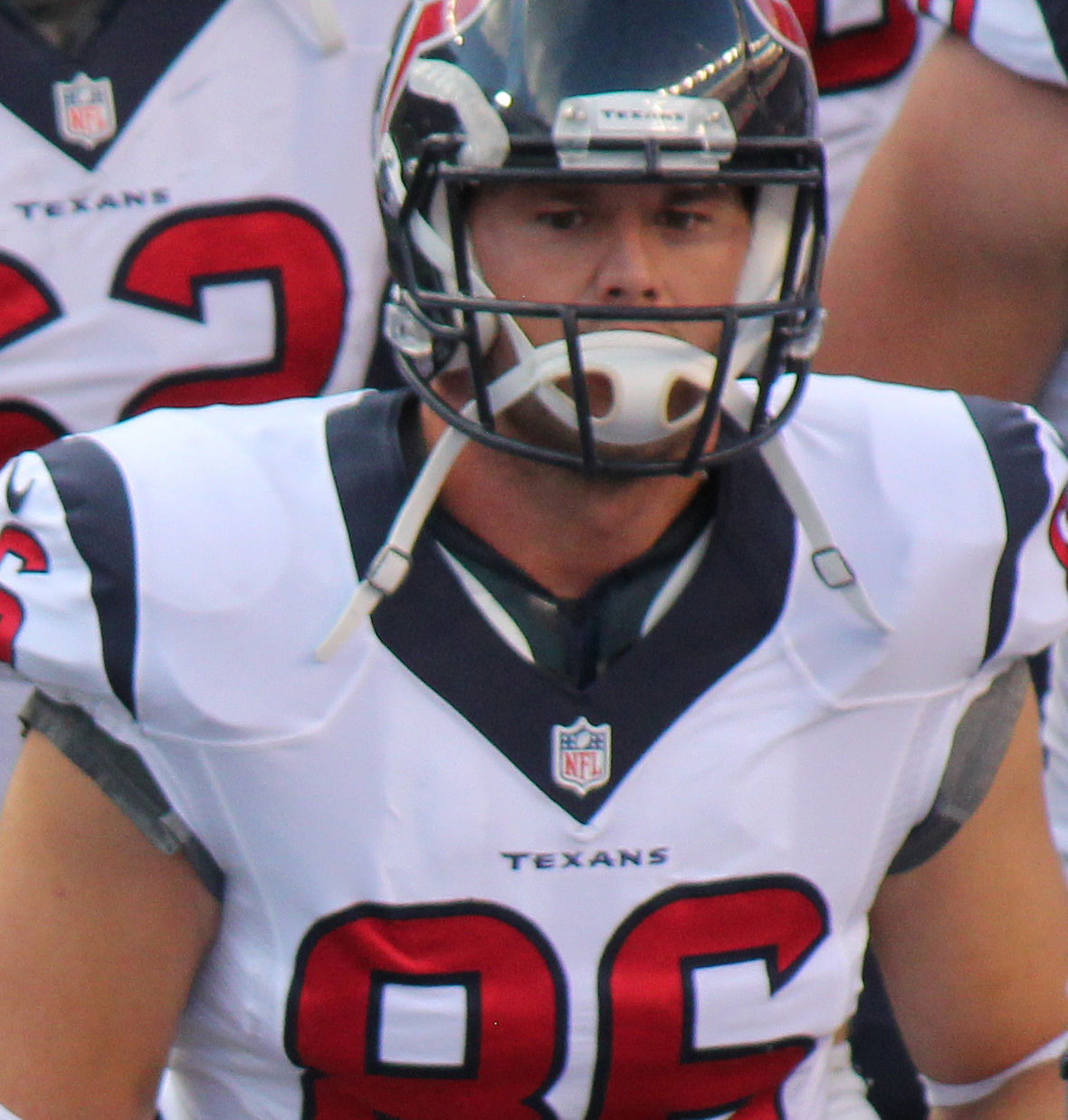
- Potter in the 2014 NFL preseason.

No. 88
- Position: Tight end

Personal information
- Born: May 4, 1986 (age 40); Omaha, Nebraska, U.S.
- Listed height: 6 ft 7 in (2.01 m)
- Listed weight: 265 lb (120 kg)

Career information
- High school: Creighton (Omaha)
- College: Nebraska
- NFL draft: 2009: undrafted

Career history
- New York Jets (2009)*; Jacksonville Jaguars (2009–2012); St. Louis Rams (2013)*; Houston Texans (2014)*
- * Offseason or practice squad member only

Career NFL statistics
- Receptions: 11
- Receiving yards: 83
- Stats at Pro Football Reference

Zach Potter (born May 4, 1986) is an American former professional football player who was a tight end in the National Football League (NFL). He was signed by the New York Jets as an undrafted free agent in 2009. He played college football for the Nebraska Cornhuskers.

== Early life ==
Potter attended high school at Creighton Prep, Omaha, Nebraska, where he helped the Junior Jays to the Class A state title as a senior. Potter was a two-way player, starring at tight end and defensive end. In helping the school to a 12-1 record in 2004, Potter was All-State both on offense and defense—making 97 tackles, including 48 solo stops and six sacks on defense and catching he caught 24 passes for 501 yards and two touchdowns on offense. Potter also had outstanding numbers as a junior, catching 14 passes for better than 300 yards, including four touchdowns. He made 61 tackles, with 10 sacks and 11 pass breakups. His performance earned Potter First-team All-State honors. Potter also played in basketball, averaging 19 points and 11 rebounds per game as a center, and led the Junior Jays to the Class A state title game as a senior. He was a First-team All-State selection by both of the state's major newspapers in basketball.

== College career ==
At the University of Nebraska–Lincoln in 2008, Potter finished the year second on the team in tackles for loss (16) and sacks (5.5) and made 47 tackles, had two interceptions and broke up seven passes at the line of scrimmage. Potter was an again an honorable-mention All-Big 12 selection. In 2007, as a junior, Potter replaced Adam Carriker as Nebraska's starter. He played in all 12 games with 11 starts. He finished with 45 tackles, with his 11 tackles for loss and 2.5 sacks were second on the team and was an honorable-mention All-Big 12 selection. In 2006, he played in 13 games during his sophomore season, including reserve time at defensive end, as well as special teams action. He made three tackles. Potter was also a regular on both NU’s field goal/PAT and field goal/PAT block units. As a freshman, in 2005, he played in all 12 games as a true freshman, making one tackle. He was a major contributor on special teams, by blocking a field goal in NU’s 7-6 win over Pittsburgh, before blocking a Kansas State PAT in NU’s 27-25 win.

== Professional career ==
Pre-draft measurables
Height	Weight	40-yard dash	20-yard shuttle	Three-cone drill	Vertical jump	Broad jump	Bench press
6 ft 7 in (2.01 m)	279 lb (127 kg)	4.90 s	4.48 s	7.75 s	31 in (0.79 m)	8 ft 10 in (2.69 m)	20 reps
All values from NFL Combine.

=== New York Jets ===
The New York Jets signed Potter and an undrafted free agent in 2009. He was waived during final cuts on September 5.

=== Jacksonville Jaguars ===
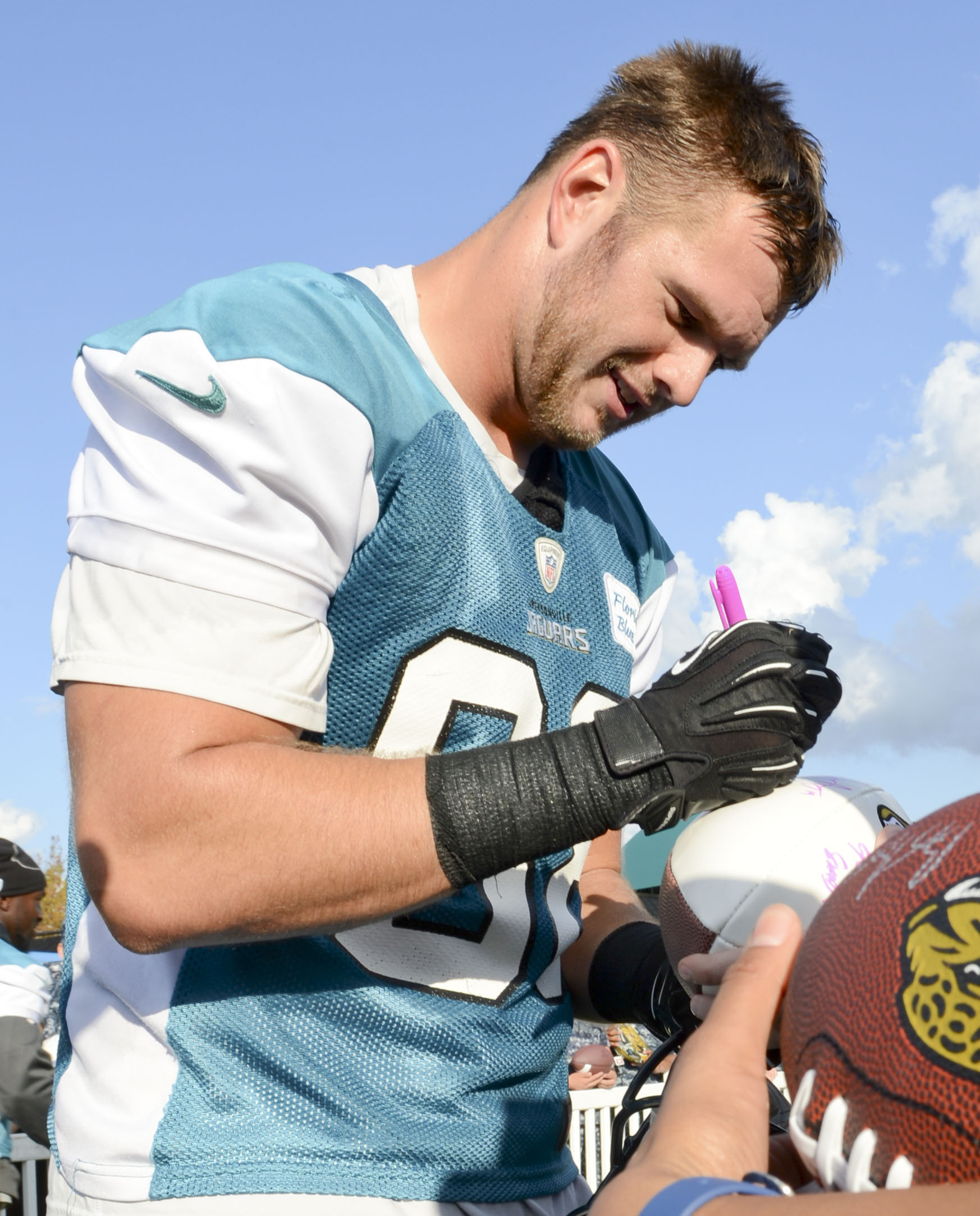
Potter in 2012

Potter was signed to the practice squad of the Jacksonville Jaguars on September 17, 2009, and converted into a tight end. He was promoted to the active roster on December 21. Potter caught his first NFL pass on Week 17 against the Cleveland Browns.

=== St. Louis Rams ===
Potter was signed by the St. Louis Rams on May 20, 2013. He was released on August 31.

=== Houston Texans ===
On February 26, 2014, Potter was signed by the Houston Texans. He was released during final roster cuts on August 29.
