= Frantz Hardy =

American gridiron football player (born 1985)

No. 87
- Position: Wide receiver

Personal information
- Born: January 6, 1985 (age 41); Miami, Florida, U.S.
- Listed height: 6 ft 0 in (1.83 m)
- Listed weight: 186 lb (84 kg)

Career information
- High school: Miami (FL) Booker T. Washington
- College: Nebraska
- NFL draft: 2008: undrafted

Career history
- Philadelphia Eagles (2008)*; Montreal Alouettes (2009)*; Tampa Bay Storm (2010)*; Nebraska Danger (2011)*; Kansas City Command (2011)
- * Offseason or practice squad member only

Career AFL statistics
- Receptions: 3
- Receiving yards: 25
- Receiving TDs: 0
- Stats at ArenaFan.com

Frantz Hardy (born January 6, 1985) is an American former football wide receiver. He was undrafted in the 2008 NFL draft and played college football for the Nebraska Cornhuskers. He was cut on August 22, 2008, from the Philadelphia Eagles due to a leg injury.

Frantz Hardy graduated from Booker T. Washington High School in Miami, Florida in 2003. Obtained a football scholarship at Butler Community College where he received an honor as a Pre Season All-American in the NJCAA Division. After leading the Grizzlies to the National Title game in 2005, he accepted a football scholarship to University of Nebraska–Lincoln with teammate Zac Taylor. Graduating with a Bachelor degree in Social Science, Frantz signed with the Philadelphia Eagles as a Free agent in the summer of 2008. Frantz is the youngest sibling of six brothers and one sister.

Hardy signed with the Montreal Alouettes of the Canadian Football League on January 14, 2009, but was released at the end of a remarkable pre-season on June 24, 2009.

In 2011 signed a professional contract with the Nebraska Danger.
