= Sam Keller =

American football player (born 1984)

Profile
- Position: Quarterback

Personal information
- Born: September 28, 1984 (age 42); Danville, California, U.S.
- Listed height: 6 ft 4 in (1.93 m)
- Listed weight: 235 lb (107 kg)

Career information
- High school: San Ramon Valley (Danville)
- College: Nebraska
- NFL draft: 2008: undrafted

Career history
- Oakland Raiders (2008)*; Los Angeles Avengers (2008)
- * Offseason or practice squad member only

Awards and highlights
- Nebraska Season Completion Percentage Record (63.07%, 2007); Nebraska Record for Single-Game Completions (36 vs. USC, 2007); Nebraska Offensive Scout Team MVP (2006); Sun Bowl Most Valuable Player (Arizona State, 2004)
- Stats at ArenaFan.com

Samuel Michael Keller (born September 28, 1984) is an American former professional football player who was a quarterback in the National Football League (NFL). He lives in Scottsdale, Arizona. He was signed by the Los Angeles Avengers as an undrafted free agent in 2008. He played college football for the Arizona State Sun Devils and Nebraska Cornhuskers. Although Keller's football career never took off on any significant professional level, he is still remembered by many college football fans for being the player with a lawsuit against EA Sports and the NCAA that ultimately resulted in the cancellation of the widely popular NCAA Football video game series after 17 consecutive years of successful release.

Keller was also a member of the Oakland Raiders.

== Early life ==
Keller attended San Ramon Valley High School in Danville, California, and was a student and a letterman in football and basketball. In football, Keller was a three-year starter, twice named his team's Offensive M.V.P., was a two-time first team All-East Bay League selection, and was a two-time second team All-Contra Costa Times selection. He finished his senior season with 3,282 passing yards and 38 touchdowns. After his senior football season, Keller was invited to the California/Florida High School All-Star Football Game. In basketball, he was a four-year starter. Sam Keller graduated from San Ramon Valley High School in 2003.

== College career ==
=== Arizona State ===
Keller enrolled at Arizona State on a scholarship offer in 2003, as the ninth-ranked quarterback in the class. He played in six games as a true freshman, passing for 247 yards and a touchdown. His most extensive action was against UCLA, when he threw for 79 yards.

In 2004, as a sophomore, Keller played backup to senior Andrew Walter. He played in only six games, but threw for 606 yards and five touchdowns with only one interception. Keller earned his first career start in the Sun Bowl against Purdue, leading a fourth-quarter comeback victory with 370 yards and three touchdowns. He earned the Sun Bowl Most Valuable Player Award.

As a junior in 2005, Keller played well in his first four games of the season. He had 461 yards against LSU, followed up by 409 yards against Northwestern. He continued with 300-yard performances against USC and Oregon State. In his four games, he passed for 1,582 yards with a 145.78 quarterback efficiency rating. However, he suffered a season-ending hand injury shortly after the four-game stretch. He only started the next three games, but finished the season with 2,165 yards and 20 touchdowns.

=== Nebraska ===
After Rudy Carpenter established himself as a capable starter in Keller's absence, in 2006, Keller transferred from Arizona State to the University of Nebraska–Lincoln. Due to NCAA transfer rules, he was forced to sit out his senior season, but redshirted to save his year of eligibility. He was named the team's scout team offensive player of the year.

In 2007, as a redshirt-senior, Keller finished the season with the Cornhuskers with 2,422 yards and 14 touchdowns in nine games. Keller also set a Nebraska career and single-season record by completing 63.1 percent of his passes, as well as passing yards per game in a single season and career (269.1). The team finished the season with a 5–7 record. Keller broke his collar bone in the ninth game against Texas and was replaced as the starter for the final three games of the season by Joe Ganz. He also briefly held the school record for passing yards in a single game (438 vs. Ball State), which Ganz later broke (510 vs. Kansas State). Keller's 2,422 yards was a career-high, along with his 10 interceptions. His 14 touchdowns was the lowest since his sophomore season, and his quarterback efficiency rating was a career-low 133.74.

== Professional career ==
=== National Football League ===
Keller was tried out by the Tampa Bay Buccaneers immediately following the 2008 NFL draft after going undrafted, however they did not sign him. Then, in May 2008, the Oakland Raiders were said to have given him a tryout. On June 25, the Raiders waived quarterback Erik Meyer and signed Keller. He was then waived on July 24. Sam is now a sales representative for a wine and spirits company in Scottsdale, AZ.

== Lawsuit ==
On May 6, 2009, Keller filed a lawsuit against EA Sports and the NCAA in an attempt to recover damages for the likenesses of college athletes being used in the NCAA Football and NCAA Basketball series. On July 31, 2013, the 9th Circuit Court of Appeals in California, ruled Electronic Arts was not protected by the First Amendment free speech in portraying the likeness of a college football player. After that ruling, Keller's attorney stated that next step would be to take aim against the NCAA.

== Personal ==
Sam Keller was the ninth-rated quarterback in the nation coming in from high school. In College, Keller majored in interdisciplinary studies (political science and history). Keller's father, Mike (sports management consultant), and stepmother, Kimberly, live in Las Vegas, NV. His father was an All-American at Michigan for Bo Schembechler and a third-round draft choice of the Dallas Cowboys. Sam Keller has three sisters named Gabby (20), Jessica (37), Crystal (21), and a brother named Robby (25). His mother Melissa Coveney and stepfather Robert Coveney live in Danville, CA. Keller married his wife Hilary on February 23, 2016, in Tempe, AZ.
