= Alex Romero (American football) =

American football player (born 1985)

Profile
- Position: Placekicker

Personal information
- Born: June 25, 1985 (age 41); New Orleans, Louisiana, U.S.
- Listed height: 5 ft 9 in (1.75 m)
- Listed weight: 180 lb (82 kg)

Career information
- College: Nicholls State
- NFL draft: 2008: undrafted

Career history
- New Orleans VooDoo (2008); San Francisco 49ers (2009)*
- * Offseason or practice squad member only
- Stats at ArenaFan.com

Alexandre Romero (born June 25, 1985) is an American former football placekicker. He was signed by the New Orleans VooDoo as a free agent in 2008. He played college football at Nicholls State University.

Romero was also a member of the San Francisco 49ers.
