= Major Culbert =

American gridiron football player (born 1987)

No. 22
- Position: Linebacker

Personal information
- Born: December 29, 1987 (age 38); Harbor City, Los Angeles, U.S.
- Listed height: 5 ft 11 in (1.80 m)
- Listed weight: 218 lb (99 kg)

Career information
- High school: Narbonne (Harbor City, California)
- College: Abilene Christian

Career history
- 2013: Toronto Argonauts
- 2016: Saskatchewan Roughriders
- Stats at CFL.ca

Major Culbert (born December 29, 1987) is an American former professional football linebacker who played for the Saskatchewan Roughriders and Toronto Argonauts of the Canadian Football League (CFL). He played college football at the University of Nebraska–Lincoln and Abilene Christian University.

== Early life ==
Culbert played high school football for the Narbonne High School Gauchos of Harbor City, Los Angeles. He recorded more than 4,000 rushing yards and scored 37 touchdowns in his career. He rushed for 1,955 yards and 17 touchdowns his senior year. He also recorded 10 receptions for 123 yards his senior year. Culbert set a school record with 332 rushing yards. He also amassed 106 tackles, seven sacks and two interceptions.

== College career ==
Culbert played college football from 2006 to 2008 with the Nebraska Cornhuskers of the University of Nebraska–Lincoln. He played running back and defensive back for the Cornhuskers before settling on defensive back in 2008.

He transferred to play his senior year of college football for the Abilene Christian Wildcats of Abilene Christian University in 2009.

== Professional career ==
Culbert was rated the 63rd best strong safety in the 2010 NFL draft by NFLDraftScout.com.

Pre-draft measurables
| Height | Weight | 40-yard dash | 10-yard split | 20-yard split | 20-yard shuttle | Three-cone drill | Vertical jump | Broad jump | Bench press |
|---|---|---|---|---|---|---|---|---|---|
| 5 ft 11 in (1.80 m) | 202 lb (92 kg) | 4.55 s | 1.62 s | 2.67 s | 4.25 s | 7.33 s | 31 in (0.79 m) | 9 ft 4 in (2.84 m) | 12 reps |
All values from Abilene Christian Pro Day

He spent time playing for the Milan Demons of the Italian Football League.

Culbert signed with the Toronto Argonauts on May 10, 2013. He played in three games for the Argonauts in 2013, recording 13 defensive tackles. He was released by the Argonauts on November 18, 2013.

Culbert was signed to the Saskatchewan Roughriders' practice roster on July 25, 2016. He was promoted to the active roster on July 28. He totaled 16 defensive tackles in four games for the Roughriders during the 2016 season. Culbert was released by the team on August 23, 2016.

== Personal life ==
Culbert has spent time acting in Los Angeles since being released by the Argonauts.
