= Colorado Buffaloes =

Intercollegiate sports teams of University of Colorado

- University: University of Colorado Boulder
- Nickname: Buffaloes
- NCAA: Division I (FBS)
- Conference: Big 12 (primary); Rocky Mountain Intercollegiate Ski Association (skiing)
- Athletic director: Fernando Lovo
- Location: Boulder, Colorado
- Varsity teams: 17
- Football stadium: Folsom Field
- Basketball arena: CU Events Center
- Soccer stadium: Prentup Field
- Colors: Silver, black, and gold
- Mascot: Ralphie - (live bison); Chip - (costumed mascot)
- Fight song: Fight CU
- Website: cubuffs.com

Big 12 logo in Colorado’s colors

The Colorado Buffaloes are the athletic teams that represent the University of Colorado Boulder. The university sponsors 17 varsity sports teams. Both the men's and women's teams are called the Buffaloes (Buffs for short) or, rarely, the Golden Buffaloes. "Lady Buffs" referred to the women's teams beginning in the 1970s, but was officially dropped in 1993. The nickname was selected by the campus newspaper in a contest with a $5 prize in 1934, won by Andrew Dickson of Boulder.

The university participates as a member of the Big 12 Conference at the National Collegiate Athletic Association (NCAA) Division I Football Bowl Subdivision (FBS).

Fernando Lovo was announced as the seventh athletic director in the program's history on December 29, 2025, following the resignation of Rick George. Colorado has won 30 national championships in its history, with 21 in skiing, the most recent coming in 2024. It was ranked #14 of "America's Best Sports College" in a 2002 analysis performed by Sports Illustrated.

== History ==
Competitive football began on the Boulder campus in 1890. Early games, which bore more resemblance to rugby than modern football, were played against the School of Mines and Utah. The football stadium, originally "Colorado Stadium," was opened in 1924 and was officially renamed Folsom Field in November 1944 to honor Coach Fred Folsom, one of the most respected college football coaches of his day.

In 1934, the university's intercollegiate teams were officially nicknamed the "Buffaloes." Previous nicknames used by the press included the "Silver Helmets" and "Frontiersmen." The final game of 1934, against the University of Denver, also saw the inaugural running of a bison in a Colorado football game. A bison calf was rented from a local ranch and ran along the sidelines.

The year 1947 marked a key point in race relations on campus. The Buffaloes joined the Big Eight Conference. However, Missouri and Oklahoma had rules that would not have allowed them to challenge teams with "colored" players. A student outcry, led by campus paper Silver and Gold, led to a movement against these Jim Crow restrictions, which expanded to all the campuses of the Big 7 and eventually led to their repeal.

On June 10, 2010, the Buffaloes announced that they would join the Pacific-10 Conference, soon renamed the Pac-12 Conference, in all sports beginning on July 1, 2011.

On July 27, 2023, the Buffaloes announced that they would rejoin the Big 12 Conference in all sports beginning in the 2024–25 academic year.

== Varsity sports ==
Men's sports	Women's sports
Basketball	Basketball
Cross country	Cross country
Football	Golf
Golf	Lacrosse
Track and field^{†}	Soccer
	Tennis
	Track and field^{†}
	Volleyball
Co-ed sports
Skiing
† – Track and field includes both indoor and outdoor.

The University of Colorado was a member of the Colorado Football Association in 1893, and became a charter member of the Colorado Faculty Athletic Conference in 1909, which changed its name a year later to Rocky Mountain Faculty Athletic Conference. Colorado left the RMFAC to become a charter member of the Mountain States Conference (a.k.a. Skyline Conference) in 1938. CU joined the Missouri Valley Intercollegiate Athletic Association in 1947, then commonly known as the Big Six, changing the common name to the Big Seven. In 1958, the conference added OSU to become the Big Eight Conference. It remained the Big 8 until 1996, when it combined with four member schools of the defunct Southwest Conference (Texas, Texas A&M, Texas Tech, and Baylor) to create the Big 12 Conference.

On July 1, 2011, the school joined the Pac-12 Conference, along with Utah. A total of 12 of CU's 17 varsity sports competed in the Pac-12, except the ski teams, indoor track & field teams, and the lacrosse team. The ski teams participate in the Rocky Mountain Intercollegiate Ski Association (RMISA), of which they have been members since 1947, along with fellow Pac-12 newcomer Utah. Both continue to house skiing in the RMISA. The indoor track & field teams participated in the Mountain Pacific Sports Federation (MPSF) as the Pac-12 didn't sponsor indoor track. With the Big 12 sponsoring indoor track, CU now competes in that conference. Women's lacrosse was added in the spring of 2014; that team competed in the MPSF until the Pac-12 Conference added women's lacrosse as a sport for the 2018 season. Women's lacrosse now competes in the Big 12, following the conference's decision to add the sport starting in the spring 2025 season.

Colorado is one of two Big 12 schools and one of only five Power Four schools that do not sponsor baseball, along with SMU, Syracuse, Wisconsin, and fellow Big 12 member Iowa State. CU does not have a women's softball program, one of five Big 12 members (Cincinnati, Kansas State, TCU, West Virginia) opting not to participate.

=== Football ===
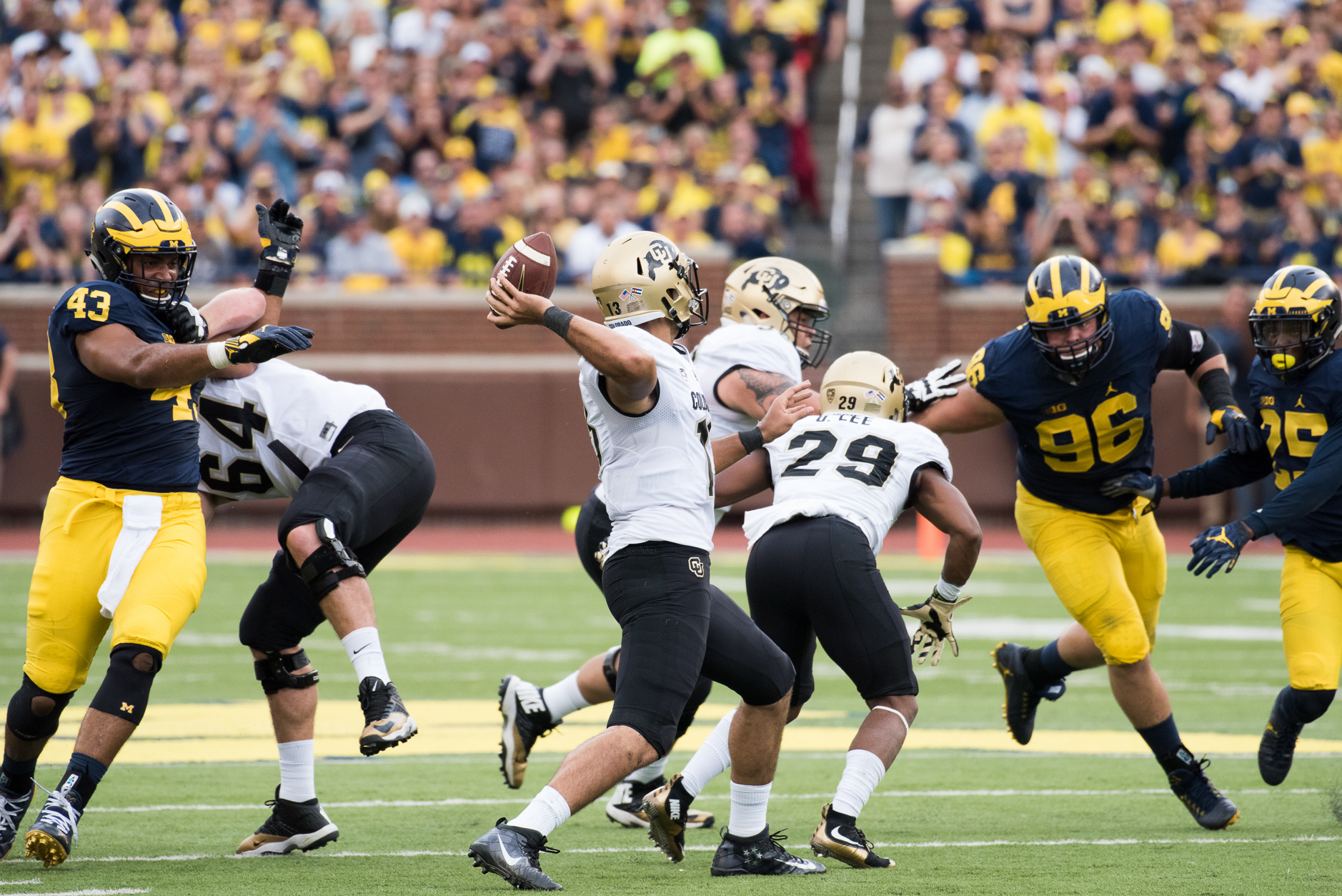
Quarterback Sefo Liufau passing at Michigan in 2016

The Colorado football program is 32nd on the all-time NCAA Division I win list and 46th in all-time winning percentage (.567). Since Folsom Field was built in 1924, the Buffaloes have been 335–195–10 (.630) at home. The Nebraska game in 2006 was CU's 1100th football game. Bill McCartney is the most famous head coach, leading Colorado to its only national championship in 1990. Current head coach Deion Sanders was approved by the university's board of regents in December 2022.

Beginning competitive play in 1890, Colorado has enjoyed much success throughout its history. The team has won numerous bowl games (31 appearances in bowl games (12-19), 23rd (tied) all-time prior to 2004 season), 8 Colorado Football Association Championships (1894–97, 1901–08), 1 Colorado Faculty Athletic Conference (1909), 7 RFMAC Championships (1911, 1913, 1923, 1924, 1934, 1935, 1937), 4 Mountain States Conference Championships (1939, 1942–44), 5 Big Eight (Six) conference championships (1961, 1976, 1989, 1990, 1991), 1 Big 12 conference championship (2001), 4 Big 12 North Championships (2001, 2002, 2004, 2005), and an Associated Press national championship in 1990. The team holds rivalries with Nebraska, Colorado State, and Utah.

Colorado football also has two Heisman Trophy winners:

- Rashaan Salaam (1994)
- Travis Hunter (2024)

There have also been 6 unanimous First-Team All-Americans:

- Eric Bieniemy (1990)
- Joe Garten (1990)
- Jay Leeuwenburg (1991)
- Rashaan Salaam (1994)
- Daniel Graham (2001)
- Travis Hunter (2024)

There are 10 players and one coach in the College Football Hall of Fame:

- Byron "Whizzer" White (inducted 1952)
- Joe Romig (1984)
- Dick Anderson (1993)
- Bobby Anderson (2006)
- Alfred Williams (2010)
- John Wooten (2012)
- Bill McCartney (2013)
- Herb Orvis (2016)
- Rashaan Salaam (2022)
- Deon Figures (2024)

=== Men's basketball ===
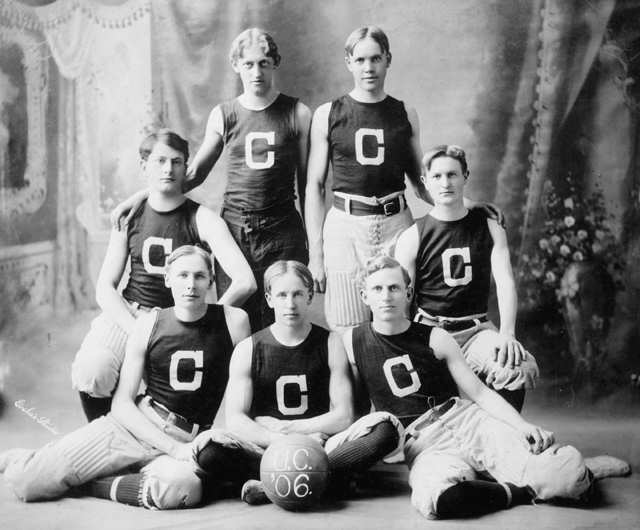
1906 Colorado Buffaloes basketball team

They play at the CU Events Center on campus and are 939–384 (.710) at home, through the 2025-26 season, including 217–52 (.807) in 16 years under coach Tad Boyle.

Data through 2025–26 season
Coach	Years	Seasons	Won	Lost	Pct.	Conf. Titles	NCAA¹	NIT¹
no coach	1902–1906	5	18	16	.529	5	–	–
Frank R. Castleman	1907–1912	6	32	22	.592	1	–	–
John McFadden	1913–1914	2	10	9	.526	2	–	–
James N. Ashmore	1915–1917	3	16	10	.615	1	–	–
Melbourne C. Evans	1918	1	9	2	.818	–	–	–
Joe Mills	1919–1924	6	30	24	.556	1	–	–
Howard Beresford	1925–1933	9	76	52	.594	–	–	–
Henry P. Iba	1934	1	9	8	.529	–	–	–
Earl “Dutch” Clark	1935	1	3	9	.250	–	–	–
Forrest B. Cox	1936– 1950	13	147	89	.623	4	3	2
H. B. Lee	1950–1956	6	63	74	.459	2	2	–
Russell “Sox” Walseth	1956– 1976	20	261	245	.516	3	3	–
Bill Blair	1976– 1981	5	67	69	.493	–	–	–
Tom Apke	1981– 1986	5	59	81	.421	–	–	–
Tom Miller	1986– 1990	4	35	79	.307	–	–	–
Joe Harrington	1990– 1996	6	72	85	.459	–	–	2
Ricardo Patton	1996–2007	12	184	160	.535	–	2	4
Jeff Bzdelik	2007–2010	3	36	58	.383	–	–	–
Tad Boyle	2010–present	16	329	220	.599	1	6	5
Totals		124	1,456	1,312	.526	20	16	13

¹ Invitations

=== Women's basketball ===
Women's Basketball started at Colorado in 1975. The team has had seven coaches and the current coach is JR Payne.

=== Skiing ===
The CU ski team competes as a member of the Rocky Mountain Intercollegiate Ski Association, as CU is one of two members of the Big-12 along with Utah that competes in skiing. Colorado is one of the dominant programs in the NCAA in skiing, winning 21 total national championships, including 20 NCAA Championships, most recently in 2024. The Buffaloes have won 29 RMISA championships, most recently in 2024. The Buffaloes have had 53 individuals connected to the school participate in the Olympics 85 times. Colorado has had 105 individual national champions, including Magnus Bøe men's Nordic titles in 2021 (2), and 2024 (20k), Cassidy Gray winning the women's GS championship in 2021, and Magdalena Luczak sweeping the alpine events in 2024.

=== Cross country ===
Boulder's high elevation of 5,400 feet (1,650 m) adds aerobic stress to distance runners and is known to produce a competitive edge when altitude-trained athletes compete at sea level. The 1998 cross country team was the subject of a book, Running with the Buffaloes, which documents the team's training regimen under long-time coach Mark Wetmore. Colorado has won five NCAA Men's Cross Country Championships (2001, 2004, 2006, 2013, and 2014) and three NCAA Women's Cross Country Championships (2000, 2004, 2018). The men's team also has won four individual titles (Mark Scrutton, Adam Goucher, Jorge Torres, and Dathan Ritzenhein), while the women's side has won two (Kara Goucher, Dani Jones).

The men won the first twelve Big 12 Conference titles in the conference's history and the women won 11 of the first 12 (all but 1998–99), with the two teams combining for 23 of the 32 championships awarded before the Buffs left the Big 12 in 2011 to join the Pac-12. Since joining the Pac-12 Conference, the Colorado men won their first six conference titles (2011, 2012, 2013, 2014, 2015, 2016) and the Colorado women have claimed four conference titles, including three consecutive following a shot lapse (2011, 2015, 2016, 2017).

=== Baseball ===
The Colorado Buffaloes baseball team was discontinued after the 1980 season. Baseball, wrestling, men's and women's gymnastics, men's and women's swimming, and women's diving comprised the seven programs that were discontinued on June 11, 1980, due to budget cuts. Colorado was the only Pac-12 school and one of only five Power 4 schools that do not sponsor baseball, the other four being Iowa State, SMU, Syracuse and Wisconsin.

=== Men's golf ===
The men's golf team won three Big Eight Conference championships: 1954, 1955 (co-champions), 1968. Hale Irwin won the 1967 NCAA Championship.

== Club sports ==
Colorado has a very active and developed club sports system with over 30 sports.

- Baseball
- Crew
- Cycling
- Dance
- Diving
- Equestrian
- Fencing
- Field hockey
- Fly fishing
- Freestyle skiing
- Men's ice hockey
- Women's ice hockey
- Kayaking
- Men's lacrosse
- Women's lacrosse
- Racquetball
- Roller hockey
- Men's rugby
- Women's rugby
- Running
- Snowboarding
- Men's soccer
- Women's soccer
- Women's softball
- Swimming
- Taekwondo
- Co-ed tennis
- CU Triathlon Team
- Men's ultimate
- Women's ultimate
- Men's volleyball
- Women's volleyball
- Water polo
- Men's wrestling

=== Men's rugby ===
Colorado's rugby program was founded in 1967. The Buffaloes play in the Western Division of Division I-A, where they play against local rivals such as Colorado State and less localized teams like the New Mexico and Utah State. The Buffaloes are led by head coach Murray Wallace, assisted by John Barkmeier Chris Dyas, Justin Holshuh, Conor Sears, and Steve Brown. Kevin Whitcher coaches the Buffaloes sevens team. The Buffaloes have consistently been ranked among the top college rugby teams in the country.

Colorado's best run was 1984–1985, when it reached the 1984 national finals before losing 12-4 to powerhouse Cal, and finished third in the 1985 national playoffs losing again to eventual champion Cal, this time in the semifinals. More recently, in 2008 the Buffaloes went 15-3 and reached the semifinals of the national championships. Colorado won the 2011 Pac-12 rugby sevens tournament, defeating Utah 14–12 in the final, to qualify for the 2011 USA Rugby collegiate rugby sevens national championship. Colorado finished the 2011–12 season ranked 14th in the nation. In the 2012–13 season, Colorado defeated Wisconsin 54-24 to advance to the national D1-A quarterfinals, before losing to St. Mary's. The Buffs also won the plate final in the 2015–2016 season at the Las Vegas Invitational 7s tournament in the college bracket. Most recently the Buffs lost in the plate final to Clemson in the inaugural international Red Bull University Sevens tournament.

=== Cycling ===
Founded in 1983 by Jim Castagneri, the cycling team was taken to the national championships in 1987 by 1992 Olympian John Stenner. The CU cycling team frequently ranks in the top five USA Cycling Collegiate teams in both road cycling and mountain biking disciplines. They have won the national championship on several occasions, including 2005, when they won in both disciplines. Many members of the club have gone on into professional cycling, including Sepp Kuss and Tyler Hamilton.

A founding club member of the Rocky Mountain Collegiate Cycling Conference, the team is open to any student who pays annual dues and meets a minimum amount of credits during the semester. The members include nearly every different type of cyclist, from BMX riders, trials, and bicycle commuters to elite amateur or part-time professional road and mountain riders. Specifically, to qualify for road or mountain nationals, a rider must have enough high race results to upgrade to "A" category in the USA Cycling rankings. A number of "A" riders will be chosen by the coaches to represent CU at the national championships. The number of riders the team is allowed to send is based on how well the team did overall during the season.

== Championships ==
=== NCAA team championships ===
Colorado has won 28 national championships.

- Men's (16)
  - Cross Country (5): 2001, 2004, 2006, 2013, 2014
  - Skiing (11): 1959, 1960, 1972, 1973, 1974, 1975, 1976, 1977, 1978, 1979, 1982
- Women's (3)
  - Cross Country (3): 2000, 2004, 2018
- Co-ed (9)
  - Skiing (9): 1991, 1995, 1998, 1999, 2006, 2011, 2013, 2015, 2024
- see also:
  - Pac-12 Conference NCAA championships
  - List of NCAA schools with the most NCAA Division I championships

=== Other national team championships ===
- Men's (1)
  - Football (1): 1990
- Women's (1)
  - Skiing (1): 1982 (AIAW)
- Note: Skiing was a men's NCAA sport from 1954–82 and became co-ed in 1983. The AIAW sponsored women's skiing and a national championship from 1977-82 before being absorbed by the NCAA at which time skiing became co-ed.

== Traditions ==
The University has had several fight songs that have lost and gained popularity over the years. The oldest, "Glory Colorado", is sung to the tune of "Battle Hymn of the Republic" and has been around nearly as long as the school. Glory Colorado is considered to represent all campuses of the University. "Go Colorado" was originally sung exclusively by the Glee Club at football games, though it is now played and known almost exclusively by members of the Golden Buffalo Marching Band. The most popular of the three fight songs and the most widely recognized is "Fight CU." Originally sung by the football team, the song has gained enough popularity that few people outside the band know that it is not the only fight song of the university. The original version included the line "fight, fight for every yard" but the line was changed to "fight, fight for victory" to allow the song to be used for all sports, not just football.

=== Mascots ===
The two mascots present at all football games are Ralphie, a live buffalo, and Chip, a costumed mascot who was selected to the 2003 Capital One All-America Mascot Team and won the 2009, 2010 and 2020 UCA Mascot National Championships. Ralphie is actually Ralphie VII and leads the football team onto the field at the beginning of the first and second halves. A buffalo leading the team onto the field dates as far back as 1934 and the Ralphie tradition began in 1966. In 1934 after the selection of Buffaloes as a nickname when a group of students paid $25 to rent a buffalo calf and cowboy as his keeper for the last game of the season. The calf was the son of Killer, a famed bison at Trails End Ranch in Fort Collins, Colorado. It took the cowboy and four students to keep the calf under control on the sidelines during the game, a 7–0 win at the University of Denver on Thanksgiving Day.

=== Colors ===
The official school colors are silver and gold, adopted in 1888 as a symbol of the mineral wealth of the state. In 1959, the athletic teams started using black and yellow, because silver and gold ended up looking like dirty white and dirty yellow. The colors have stuck and many are unaware that the official school colors are silver and gold.

On May 28, 1981, black was curiously replaced by "Sky Blue" by a mandate of the CU Board of Regents, to represent the color of the Colorado sky. However, this color was different from the blue uniforms of the U.S. Air Force Academy. After three years, the blue was changed in 1984 to a darker shade, though still unpopular. In black and white photographs the players' numbers are nearly invisible. During a difficult 1-10 season in 1984, football head coach Bill McCartney employed black "throwback" jerseys for an emotional lift for the games against Oklahoma and Nebraska, without success.

In April 1985, the CU athletic teams were given the option of blue or black. The football team chose to wear black, and at Folsom Field the background for the signature "Colorado" arc (at the base of the seats behind the south end zone), blue for four years, was repainted black as well. On the football uniforms, the blue was reduced to a stripe on the sleeve for three seasons (1985–87) before being dropped completely in 1988. In 2007, CU debuted new football jerseys that reintegrated silver as a uniform color.

== Facilities ==
Facility Name	Teams	Capacity	Largest Crowd	Opened
Folsom Field	football	50,183	54,972 (9/3/05 vs. Colorado State)	1924
CU Events Center	basketball, volleyball	11,064	11,708 (12/05/12 vs. Colorado State)	1979
Prentup Field	soccer	800	1,871	2004
Potts Field	track and field		2,784 (Single Day); 6,000+ (3 Day total) (during 2008 Big 12 Track and Field Championships)	1967
Balch Fieldhouse	indoor track	4,000		1937
South Campus Tennis Complex	tennis			2003
Buffalo Ranch CC Course	cross country			
Colorado National Golf Course	golf			
Eldora Mountain Resort	skiing			1962

== University of Colorado Athletic Hall of Fame ==
Criteria for automatic selection: Three-time all-conference selection, two-time All-American, trophy winner or previously retired jersey. Beginning in 2015, the school went from a two-year to one year induction cycle to catch up on its history. Inductees are nominated by their peers in the Alumni C Club or by members of the selection committee.

=== Class of 1998 ===
- Byron White (football, basketball, baseball, track, 1935–38)

=== Class of 1999 ===
- Gil Cruter (track, 1934–37)
- Burdette "Burdie" Haldorson (basketball, 1952–55)
- William "Kayo" Lam (football, 1933–35)
- Joe Romig (football, 1959–61)
- Lisa Van Goor (basketball, 1981–85)

=== Class of 2000 ===
- David Bolen (track, 1946–48)
- Jimmie Heuga (skiing, 1961–63)
- Dean Lahr (wrestling, 1962–64)
- Pat Patten (wrestling, cross country, track, 1940–47)

=== Class of 2002 ===
- Dick Anderson (football, 1965–67)
- Harry Carlson (baseball coach, athletic director, 1927–65)
- Darian Hagan (football, 1988–91)
- Carroll Hardy (baseball, football, track, 1951–54)
- Hale Irwin (golf, football, 1964–67)
- Russell "Sox" Walseth (men's and women's basketball coach, 1956–76 and 1980–83)

=== Class of 2004 ===
- Don Branby (football, basketball, baseball, 1949–52)
- Eddie Crowder (football coach, athletic director 1963–84)
- Cliff Meely (basketball, 1968–71)
- Frank Potts (track coach, 1927–68)
- Shelley Sheetz (basketball, 1991–95)
- Bill Toomey (track, 1959–61)
- John Wooten (football, 1956–58)

=== Class of 2006 ===
- 1959 NCAA Champion Ski Team
- Bobby Anderson (football)
- Fred Casotti (sports information director, historian)
- Adam Goucher (cross country, track, 1994–97)
- Bill Marolt (skiing champion, skiing coach, athletic director)
- Bill McCartney (football coach, 1982–94)]

=== Class of 2008 ===
Don Campbell (track, 1946–50)

- Frank Clarke (football, 1954–56)
- Kara Grgas-Wheeler (cross country, track, 1996–2002)
- Billy Lewis (basketball, track, 1957–60)
- Dave Logan (football, basketball, 1972–76)
- John Stearns (baseball, football, 1970–73)
- Claude Walton (track, 1933–36)
- Dal Ward (football, administration, 1948–74)
- Alfred Williams (football, 1987–90)

=== Class of 2010 ===
- Ceal Barry (basketball, 1983–2005)
- Eric Bieniemy (football, 1987–90)
- Tera Bjorklund (basketball, 2000–04)
- Cliff Branch (football, 1970–72)
- Kelly Campbell (volleyball, 1996–99)
- Ken Charlton (basketball, 1960–63)
- Dale Douglass (golf, 1958–59)
- Bob Stransky (football, 1955–57)
- Bridget Turner (basketball, 1985–89)
- Buddy Werner (skiing, 1959, 1961–63)

=== Class of 2012 ===
- Frank Bernardi (football, baseball, 1952–55)
- Alan Culpepper (cross country, track, 1992–96)
- Mary Decker Slaney (cross country, track, 1977–79)
- Boyd Dowler (football, 1956–58)
- Joe Garten (football, 1987–90)
- Jack Harvey (basketball, 1937–40)
- Steve Jones (golf, 1977–81)
- Leason "Pete" McCloud (basketball, 1939–42)
- Vidar Nilsgard (skiing, 1971–74)
- Matt Russell (football, 1993–96)
- Rashaan Salaam (football, 1992–94)
- Larry Zimmer (announcer, 1971–present)

=== Class of 2014 ===
- Bob Beattie (skiing coach, 1957–65)
- Forrest B. "Frosty" Cox (basketball coach, 1935–50)
- Jim Davis (basketball, 1961–64)
- Deon Figures (football, 1988–92)
- Bob Jeangerard (basketball, 1952–55)
- Linn Long (wrestling, coach, 1952–68)
- Don Meyers (track, coach 1959–75)
- Herb Orvis (football, 1969–71)
- Yvonne Scott (track, 1992–96)

=== Class of 2015 ===
- Chauncey Billups (basketball, 1995–97)
- Jon Burianek (administration, 1968–2006)
- Bill Fanning (baseball, 1946–49)
- Stephan Hienzsch (skiing, 1975–78)
- Frank Prentup (baseball coach, football coach, 1941–69)
- Mike Pritchard (football, 1987–90)
- Erin Scholz (basketball, 1993–97)
- Mark Scrutton (cross country, track, 1979–83)
- Nicole Vranesh (volleyball, 1990–93)>
- Scott Wedman (basketball, 1971–74)
- Tom Woodard (golf, 1973–77)

=== Class of 2016 ===
- Dale "Pete" Atkins (baseball, 1940–42)
- Bill Brundige (football, 1967–69)
- Ted Castaneda (cross country & track, 1972–74)
- Sara Gorton (Slattery) (cross country & track, 2000–05)
- Jerry Hillebrant (football, 1959–61)
- Chris Hudson (football, 1991–94)
- Bob Justice (wrestling, 1967–69)
- Bob Kalinowski (golf, 1990–94)
- Jim Miller (track, 1962–64)
- Fran Munnelly (soccer, 2002–05)
- Shaun Vandiver (basketball, 1988–91)
- Michael Westbrook (football, 1991–94)

=== Class of 2017 ===
- Stan Brock (football, 1976–79)
- Chad Brown (football, 1989–92)
- Frank Brown (skiing, 1957–59)
- Karrie Downey (volleyball, 1991–94)
- Les Fowler (golf athlete & golf coach, 1946–76)
- Steve Hatchell (football/administration, 1966–75)
- Mark Haynes (football, 1976–79)
- Jay Humphries (basketball, 1980–84)
- Jamillah Lang (women's basketball, 1990–94)
- Jorge Torres (cross country & track, 1999–2003)

=== Class of 2018 ===
- Pete Brock (football, 1972–75)
- Hatfield Chilson (football/basketball/baseball, 1923–26)
- Charlie Gardner (basketball, 1963–66)
- Daniel Graham (football, 1998–2001)
- Jay Howell (baseball, 1974–76)
- Ron Scott (football/administration, 1965–67, 1982–2001, 2010–18)
- Steve Sidwell (football & assistant coach, 1963–73)
- Kordell Stewart (football, 1991–94)
- Donna Waller (track, 1984–87)
- Chuck Williams (basketball, 1965–68)
- Lucie Zikova (skiing, 2005–08)

=== Class of 2019 ===
- Gary Barnett (football coach, 1984–91; 1999–2005)
- Jenny (Barringer) Simpson (cross country & track, 2005–09)
- Brian Cabral (football: player & assistant coach, 1974–77, 1989–2012)
- Fred Folsom (football coach, 1895–99, 1901–02, 1908–15)
- Bruce Gamble (skiing, 1975–78)
- Barry Helton (football, 1984–87)
- Ed Pudlik (football & baseball, 1946–49)
- Daniel Reese (cross country & track, 1982–87)
- Jana Rehemaa (skiing, 2003–06)
- Jane Wahl (women's athletic director, 1975–79)

=== Class of 2021 ===
- Donnie Boyce (basketball, 1991–95)
- Chris Brown (football, 2001–02)
- Nikki Marshall (soccer, 2006–09)
- Chris Naeole (football, 1992–96)
- Mickey Pruitt (football, 1984–87)
- Dathan Ritzenhein (cross country & track, 2001–04)
- Richard Rokos (ski coach, 1987–2021)
- Jack Ryan (gymnastics, 1966–68)
- Lee Willard (football, basketball, baseball & track, 1918–22)

=== Class of 2022 ===
- Greg Biekert (football, 1989–92)
- Charlie Davis (football, 1971–73)
- Jane Frederick (track & field, 1970–73)
- Maria Grevsgaard (skiing, 2006–09)
- Jimmy Griffith (skiing, 1947–51)
- Yolanda Johnson (track & field, 1986–90)
- Jay Leeuwenburg (football, 1988–91)
- Dick Tharp (athletic director, 1996–2004)
- Debbie Willcox Debbie Willcox Mills (gymnastics, 1978–80)
- Peggy Coppom and Betty Hoover (superfans/program matriarchs, 1940s–present; Legacy Wing inductees)

=== Class of 2023 ===
- Emma Coburn (cross country & track, 2009–13)
- Karol Damon (track & field, 1989–92)
- Robert Doll (basketball, 1939–42)
- Andre Gurode (football, 1998–2001)
- Bill Harris (football/administration, 1961–63; 2001–10)
- Clark Matis (skiing, 1967–69)
- Laura Munnelly (soccer, 2003–06)
- Nate Solder (football, 2007–10)
- Brittany Spears (basketball, 2007–11)
- Philip DiStefano (university chancellor/administration, 1974–2024; Legacy Wing inductee)
- John and Shaaron Parker (Ralphie program directors, 1985–2001; Legacy Wing inductees)

=== Class of 2024 ===
- Ronnie Bradford (football, 1989-92)
- John Gregorio (cross country & track, 1971–73)
- Don Hasselbeck (football, 1973–76)
- Ben Kelly (football, 1997–99)
- Harold "Monk" Saunders (golf/football, 1937–40)
- John Skajem (skiing, 1986–87)
- Anette Skjolden (skiing, 1991–93)
- Dan Stavely (football coach/administrator, 1958; 1963–83)
- Rachel Wacholder Scott (volleyball, 1993–96)
- Shayne Wille Culpepper (cross country & track, 1995–97)
- Alan Cass (public address announcer/events director, 1965–2020; Legacy Wing inductee)
- "Pasta" Jay Elowsky (athletic donor/community pillar, 1980s–present; Legacy Wing inductee)

=== Class of 2025 ===
- Jeff Campbell (football, 1986–89)
- Mason Crosby (football, 2003–06)
- Shalaya Kipp (cross country & track, 2009–14)
- Kris Livingston (administrator, 1994–2025)
- Pam Owen McCartney (track & field, 1989–93)
- Joanne Reid (skiing, 2010–13)
- Barry Remington (football, 1982–86)
- Richard Roby (basketball, 2004–08)
- Jim Willcoxon (basketball, 1937–39)
- Steve Bosley (BOLDERBoulder Co-Founder/CU Regent, 1968–present; Legacy Wing inductee)
- Carol Callan (women's basketball radio analyst/USA Basketball Director, 1980s–present; Legacy Wing inductee)

=== Confirmed future inductee ===
- Travis Hunter – Qualified for automatic selection by being twice named a consensus All-American in football, plus winning the Heisman Trophy and several other national awards in 2024.

== Notable alumni ==
- Byron White was a Supreme Court Justice after his football career.
- Hale Irwin, who was a two-time All-Big Eight defensive back and an NCAA individual golf champion at Colorado, went on to spectacular success in professional golf. He won three U.S. Opens and 17 other PGA Tour events, and retired as the all-time leader in both wins and career prize money on the 50-and-over tour now known as PGA Tour Champions (both since surpassed by Bernhard Langer).
- Adam Goucher was a professional runner who competed for the United States in the 2000 Summer Olympics.
- Chauncey Billups played for the Boston Celtics, Denver Nuggets, Detroit Pistons, Los Angeles Clippers, Minnesota Timberwolves, New York Knicks and Toronto Raptors in a 17-year NBA career (1997–2014). He was named the NBA Finals MVP in 2004.
- Jeremy Bloom played football and skied internationally finishing 6th in the 2006 Winter Olympics in the moguls and briefly played in the NFL. He also sued the NCAA and lost, having to give up football for Colorado in 2004 because he received endorsement money for skiing.
- Bill Toomey won the gold medal in the decathlon at the 1968 Summer Olympics
- Jimmie Heuga, 1964 Olympic bronze medalist, and Spider Sabich were both CU alpine ski racers from northern California.
  (Billy Kidd, 1964 Olympic silver medalist, is a CU alumnus, but did not race for the Buffs.
  He skied for the University of Vermont before joining the U.S. Ski Team, and later finished his bachelor's degree in Boulder.)
- Emma Coburn is a former world champion and American record holder in the 3000 meters steeplechase. She won the bronze medal at the 2016 Summer Olympics, becoming the inaugural American to win any medal in the event, with an American record of 9:07.63. In London at the 2017 World Championships, she became the inaugural American woman to win the Gold Medal, bettering her American record to 9:02.59.
- Jennifer Simpson represented the United States at the 2008 Beijing Olympics, 2012 London Olympics and 2016 Rio Olympics. She is a former American record holder for the 3000 meters steeplechase. In the 1500 meters, she won a gold medal at the 2011 World Championships, a silver medal at the 2013 and 2017 World Championships, and a bronze medal at the 2016 Summer Olympics in Rio, becoming the inaugural US woman to win a medal in the Olympics in any distance event along with Coburn.
- Stuart Krohn (born 1962), professional rugby union player
