= CU Fight Song =

Colorado Buffaloes fight song

"Fight CU"
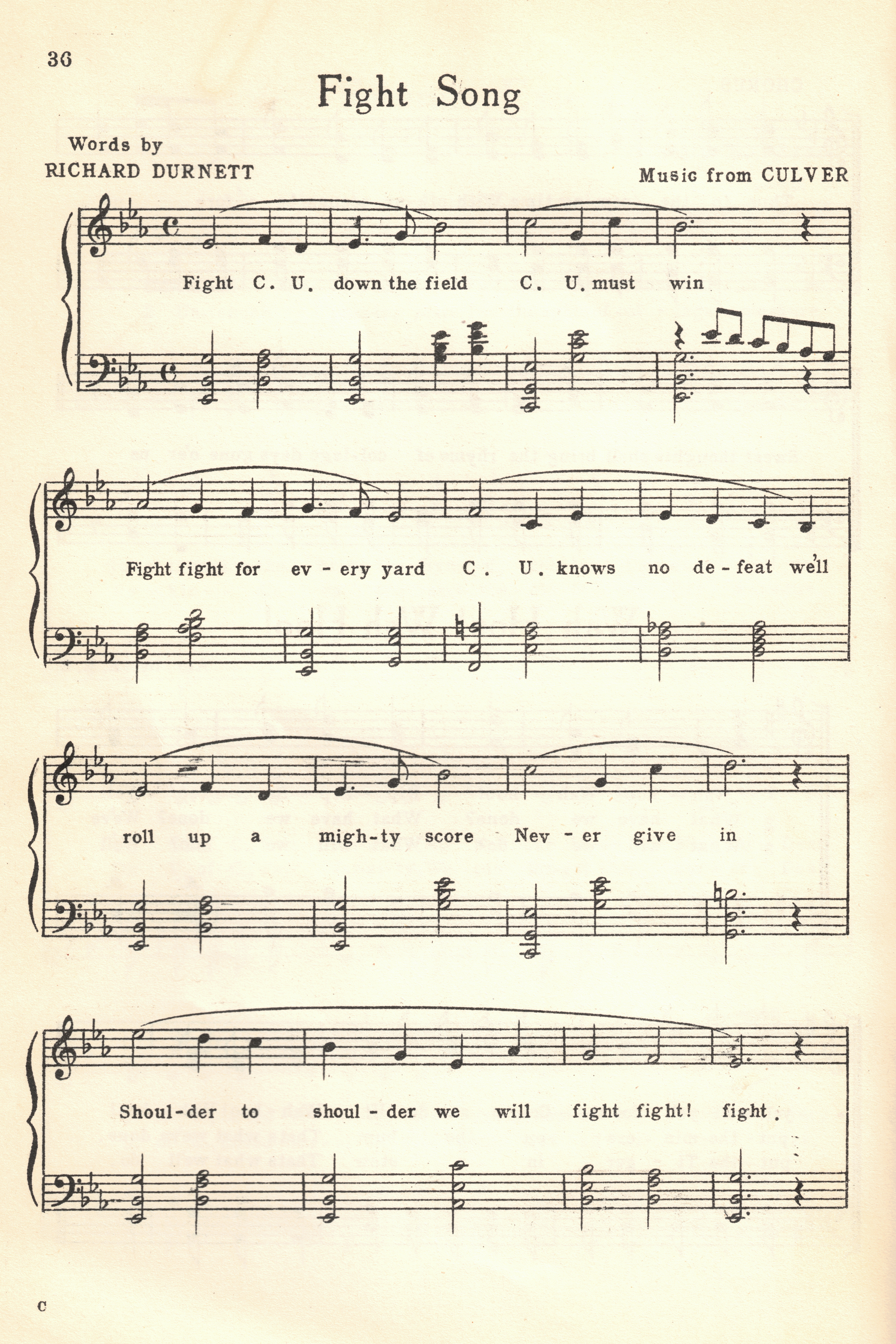

Song
- Published: 1925
- Genre: Fight song
- Lyricist: Richard Durrett

Fight CU is the fight song of the Colorado Buffaloes at the University of Colorado Boulder. The song is usually performed by the Golden Buffalo Marching Band. The lyrics of the song were written by Richard Durrett. (Note: Durrett's name is often misspelled as Durnett.)

== Lyrics ==
Fight CU down the field,
CU must win
Fight, fight for victory
CU knows no defeat
We'll roll up a mighty score
Never give in
Shoulder to shoulder
We will fight, fight
Fight, fight, fight!

== History ==
The song was originally written as a fight song in 1925 for the Culver Military Academy in Culver, Indiana by Richard Durrett (1882–1938), a piano and voice instructor at the school who also directed the glee club. It was titled "Fight, Fight, Fight" and was written at the request of a student. That June, Durrett moved to Boulder, Colorado, where he became an assistant professor of voice and the director of the glee club at the University of Colorado. He brought the song to the university with him, changing its first line from "fight Culver down the field" to "fight CU down the field". The fight song made its debut at an alumni event on October 22, 1925, and was first played at a football game that November. Durrett only stayed at the University of Colorado for a year, leaving the following June.

"Fight CU" quickly became popular at the university, being included in that year's yearbook. In the following years, a variation of the song's lyrics emerged, with some versions having "fight, fight for every yard" in place of "fight, fight for victory". It appears that the "every yard" variant fell out of use in the 1940s. The song has remained the most popular fight song at the University of Colorado ever since.

== Other songs ==
The University of Colorado has two additional fight songs, "Glory Colorado" and "Go Colorado". The oldest, "Glory Colorado", set to the tune of the Battle Hymn of the Republic, was first played at a university event in 1885. The song began to be played at football games in the years following the introduction of the football team. The song was used as an unofficial alma mater at university events for some time before one was written for that use. "Glory" is still played at football games, usually immediately after a Colorado touchdown. "Go Colorado" was written by Bill Simon in 1957 for the marching band. The three songs are often played together by the band as the "Fight Song Sequence", with "Fight CU" played as the last song of the sequence. (Note: Also called the "Fight Sequence".)
