= CU Triathlon Team =

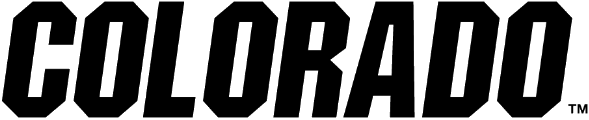
- Full name: University of Colorado Triathlon
- Sport: Triathlon
- Founded: 1993; 33 years ago
- Conference: Mountain Collegiate Triathlon
- Head coach: KJ Kroetch
- Championships: 18
- Website: colorado.edu/triathlon

The CU Triathlon Team is a sports team at the University of Colorado Boulder that competes in the sport of triathlon. The club was created in 1993 and has won 18 USA Triathlon Collegiate National Championships. As a team, they compete at the USA Triathlon's Collegiate National Championship as well as other selected competitions throughout the year.

The team competes in the Mountain Collegiate Triathlon Conference, a 12-club association of colleges and universities in the region.

== Team performance ==
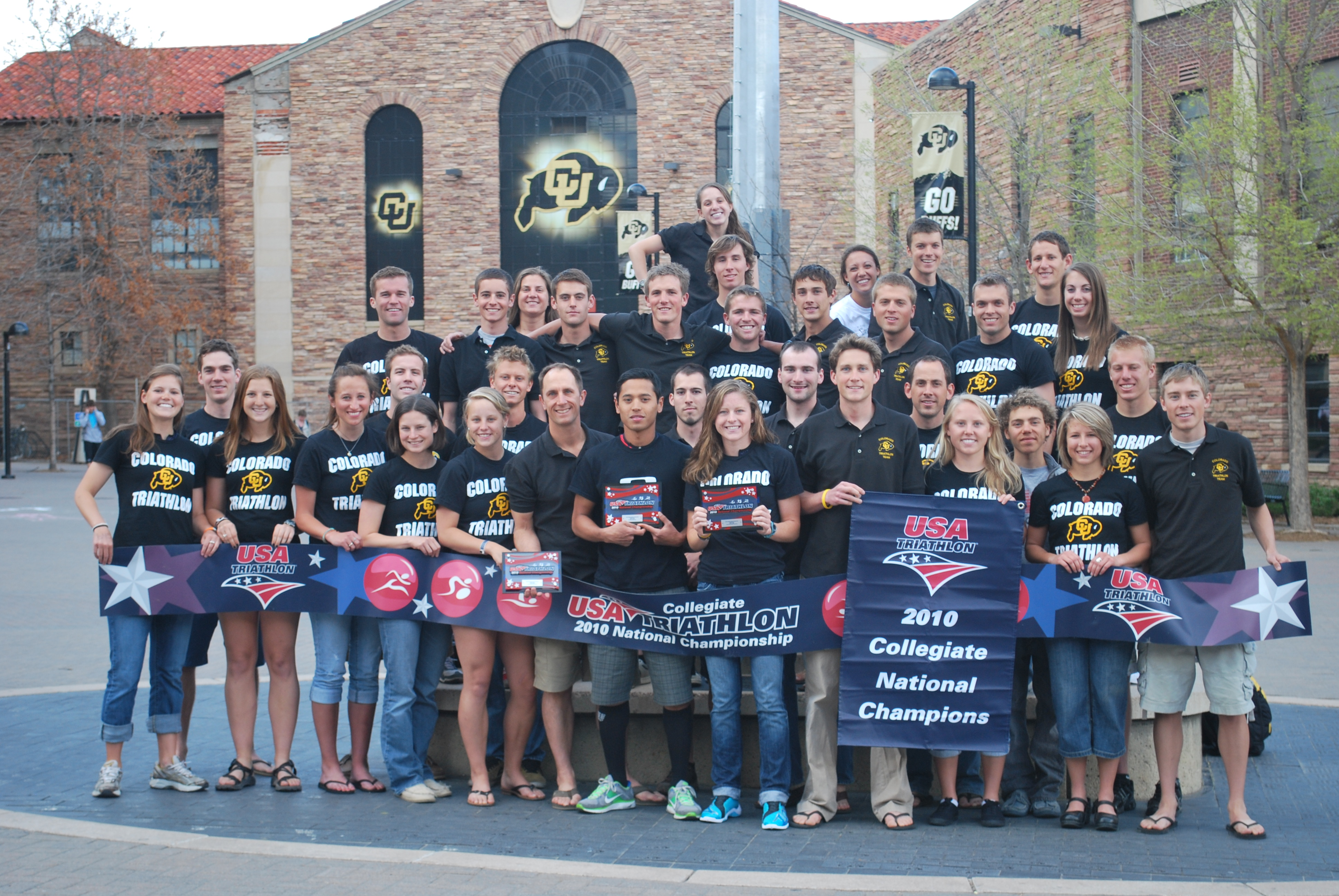
The CU Triathlon Team at the end of the 2010 season bbq

The team currently has 18 USA Triathlon Collegiate National Championship titles awarded as a combined men's and women's team score, which is 4x more championships than all other teams combined. Since the inception of the Collegiate National Championship title in 1992 the team has placed:

- 1994: National Champions
- 1995: 2nd place
- 1996: National Champions
- 1997: National Champions
- 1998: National Champions
- 1999: National Champions
- 2000: National Champions
- 2001: 2nd Place
- 2002: National Champions
- 2003: National Champions
- 2004: National Champions
- 2005: National Champions
- 2006: 3rd Place
- 2007: 3rd Place
- 2008: 2nd Place
- 2009: 4th Place
- 2010: National Champions
- 2011: National Champions
- 2012: National Champions
- 2013: National Champions
- 2014: National Champions
- 2015: National Champions
- 2016 National Champions
- 2017: National Champions
- 2018: 2nd Place
- 2019: 3rd Place
- 2021: 2nd Place
- 2022: 3rd Place
- 2023: 3rd Place
- 2024: 2nd Place
- 2025: 2nd Place
- 2026: 2nd Place

== Coaches ==
- Rick Ellison: 1996-1998
- Neal Henderson: 1999-2000
- Bettina Younge: 2001-2002
- Ryan Ignatz: 2003
- Matt Eagan: 2004
- Kirk Nelson: 2007-2008
- Mike Ricci: 2009-2013
- Dave Sheanin: 2014
- Brad Seng: 2014-2023
- KJ Kroetch: 2023-Current

== See also ==
- Columbia Multisport club
