= Ralphie the Buffalo =

Mascot of the University of Colorado Buffaloes

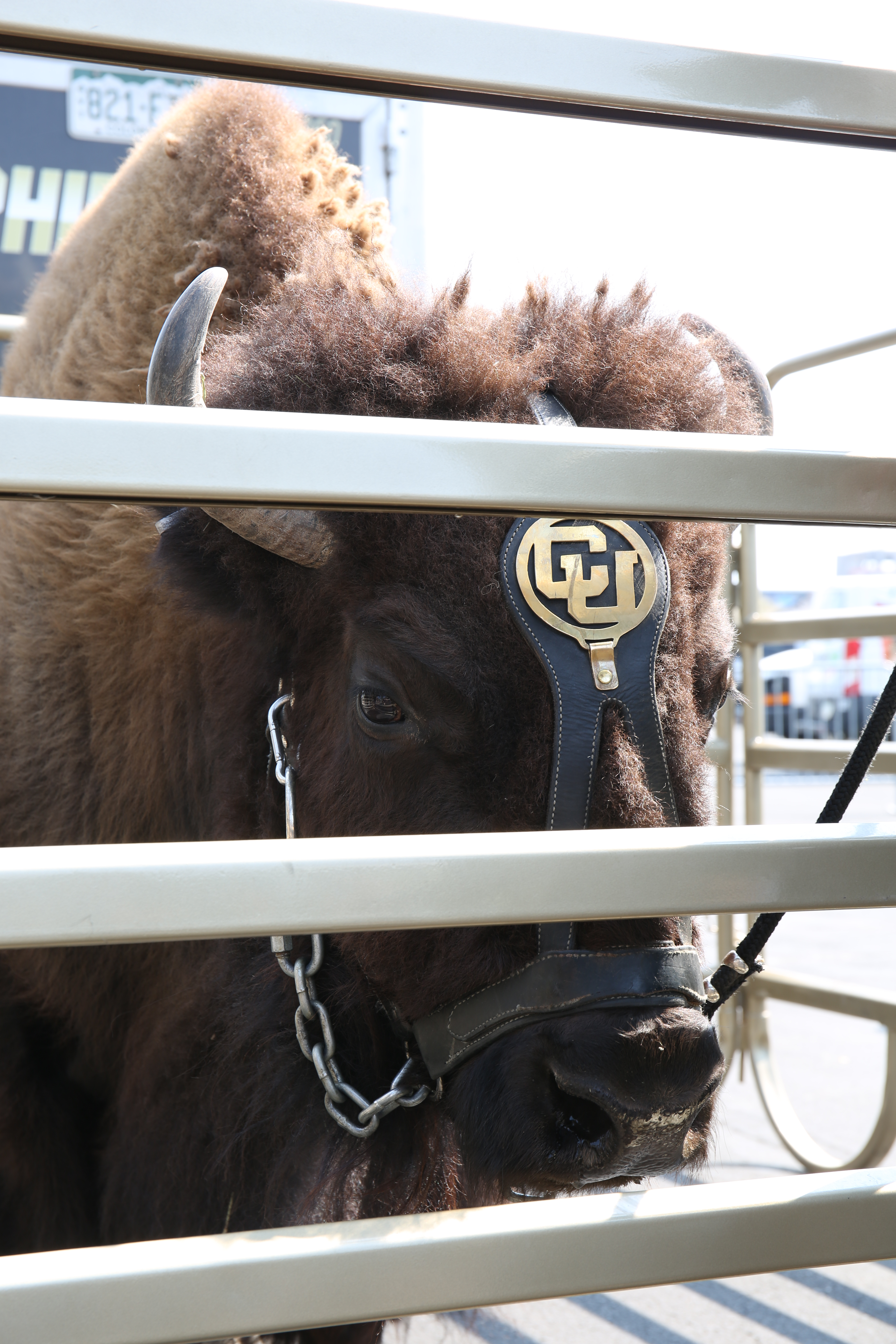
Ralphie V in 2017

Ralphie the Buffalo is the name of the live mascot of the University of Colorado Buffaloes. The current Ralphie, nicknamed Brandy, is the seventh bison to fill the role since 1966.

Ralphie is best known for running a horseshoe pattern around Folsom Field prior to each half of home football games. She begins each run as the public address announcer exclaims "Here comes Ralphie!" and typically leads the football team as they enter the playing field. She has frequently been named one of the best mascots in sports.

While commonly referred to as a buffalo, Ralphie is actually an American bison. Due to their smaller size, reduced strength, and less-aggressive temperament, female bison have always been chosen as Ralphie as opposed to males. She can reach speeds of 25 miles per hour, and it traditionally takes five handlers to guide her around the field. The team of approximately 15 "Ralphie Handlers" are student-athletes that earn varsity letters for their efforts. They spend more than 20 hours per week training, practicing, and caring for Ralphie, while rotating the privilege of running with her at the games.

== Program origins and history ==
Ralphie I

The buffalo was officially chosen as the University of Colorado's mascot in 1934. Live bison appeared on the sidelines at football games on-and-off for the next several decades. In 1957, Mr. Chips became the first named bison affiliated with the program.

Ralphie II

The bison that became Ralphie I was donated by John Lowery, the father of a CU student and made her debut on the sidelines on October 1, 1966. While she only watched from the sidelines originally, by 1967, it was determined that she would run on the field prior to games to intimidate the other team. The basis of her name and its original spelling – "Rraalph" – are of disputed origin. Her name changed to Ralphie by the end of her first full season. Ralphie I was kidnapped in 1970 by Air Force Academy students. She was also named the school’s 1971 Homecoming Queen.

All subsequent Ralphies have also been donated to the university. Ralphie II debuted before the second half of the final home game in 1978, after Ralphie I ran for the final time before the game. In 1986, Oklahoma State pranksters snuck into their college’s veterinary clinic and sprayed painted “OSU” on Ralphie's back in orange letters. On September 19, 1987, Ralphie II unexpectedly died the night after she ran during a game. Ralphie III was already preparing to take over in 1988, but was pressed into action sooner than anticipated. She became the first Ralphie to wear the blanket around her body. Ralphie IV was abandoned by her herd and attacked by a coyote before being rescued and donated to the university. Ralphie V was known as the most powerful and fastest of all the Ralphies. Ralphie VI was introduced to the public in 2021 at just 15 months of age and 500 pounds. She was retired in August 2025 due to an “indifference to running.” On September 19, 2025, it was announced that Ralphie VII would make her debut at the game against Wyoming the next day.

== Ralphie Handlers ==
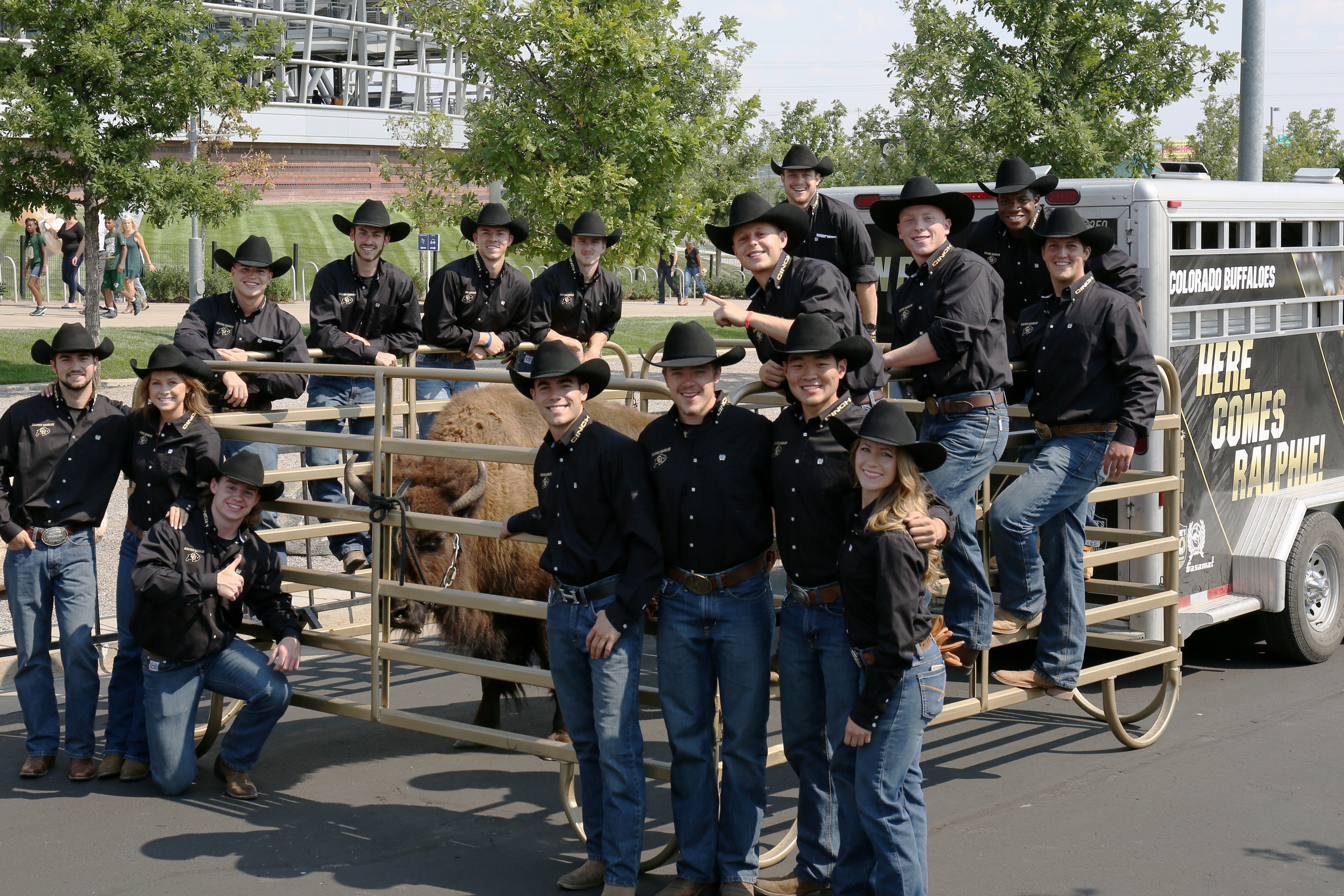
The 2017 Handlers posing with Ralphie

The Ralphie Handlers are a group of approximately 15 varsity student-athletes that volunteer 20 or more hours per week for the program in physical training, practicing, making appearances, and caring for Ralphie.

Initially called "The Men Who Run with Ralphie," the name was changed to "Ralphie Runners" in 1970. As the responsibilities and duties of the students on the team increased from just running with Ralphie to assisting in her overall care and maintenance, the name "Ralphie Handlers" was adopted in the 1980s. Handlers first started earning varsity letters in 1987. Even though the Handlers do not fall under NCAA jurisdiction, the Athletic Department still holds them to the same standards as other varsity athletes in the department. The first woman joined the Ralphie Handlers in 1992.

Taylor Stratton has been the program manager and head coach since 2020, replacing John Graves after five years. Prior to Graves, Gail Pederson directed the program for 17 years. Both Stratton and her assistants were Ralphie Handlers when they were students at Colorado. Whether or not Ralphie runs is at the sole discretion of the program manager, and her run may be canceled for any reason deemed to be in her best interest.

== Ralphie's Run and other activities ==
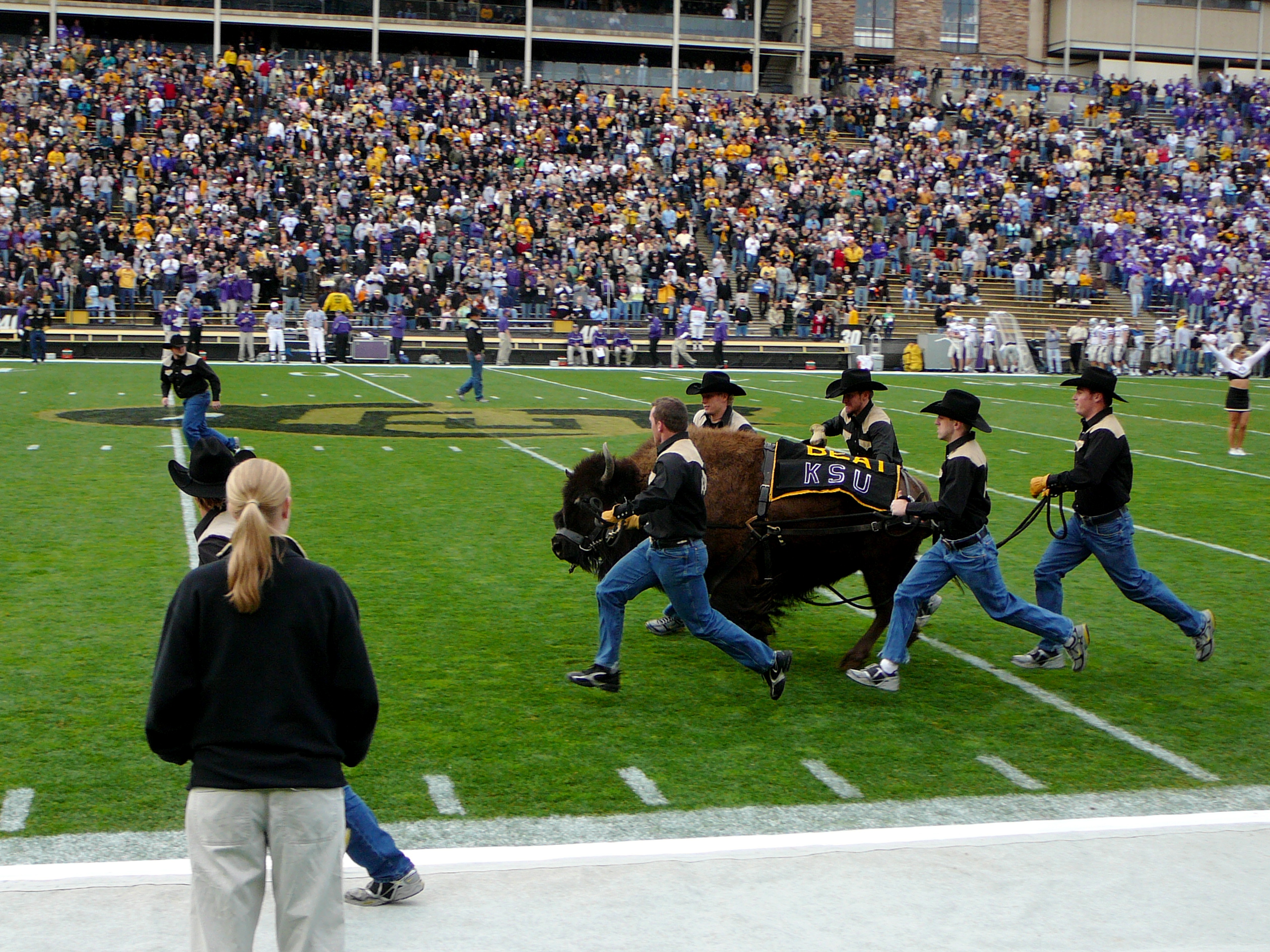
Ralphie IV runs the field with five Ralphie Handlers at the CU-KSU game in 2006

Ralphie III

Ralphie travels to and from her home ranch in a custom-designed trailer. It is insulated with vents that can be opened and closed to adjust airflow and temperature. The inside walls and floor are lined with rubber mats for her comfort. There is enough space for her to walk around, turn around, and lie down. Special gates can be closed to allow the Handlers to easily and safely attach her harness and headstall on her and bring her in and out of the trailer.

The activity for which Ralphie is most well-known is her run across the field prior to each half of Buffaloes' home games. She usually arrives on the field about one hour before kickoff on regular game days, staying in her pen until the game is about to begin. As the public address announcer exclaims "Here comes Ralphie!" the pen is opened and Ralphie and her handlers begin their run. Typically, five handlers are used for each run with Ralphie: two in the front (left and right) to steer her around the field, two in the back (left and right) to help guide her, and one in the back to control her speed, known as the loop position. The football team follows closely behind. Ralphie and her handlers follow a horseshoe-shaped route, turning around before reaching the opposite end zone and ending with Ralphie running into her trailer at nearly full speed near the visitor's entrance. The handlers not running with Ralphie are positioned around the field to help guide Ralphie along her route. Ralphie repeats her run just before the second half of the game.

When Ralphie is meeting fans at tailgates and other events, she stays in her pen. Handlers strategically stand around her pen to keep fans from getting too close or upsetting her. Handlers do not allow fans to pet or surround her, making sure she is comfortable. She rarely travels to away games – bowl games excluded – but Ralphie IV attended the September 23, 2006 road game against the Georgia Bulldogs. An ESPN producer and cameraman documented the trip and aired a special on that weekend's College Gameday.

== Ralphie's ranch ==
A look inside the ranch where Ralphie lives. The location is undisclosed to the public

Ralphie lives on a ranch in an undisclosed location to protect her and provide her with an ideal living environment. Only people associated with the program are permitted to visit her at the ranch.

Ralphie has access to shelters that allow her to avoid bad weather, however the program reports that she enjoys being outside regardless of temperature or precipitation. Ralphie's pasture contains large scratching posts made of old street sweeper brushes donated by the city of Boulder. She uses these mainly in the spring to help shed her thick winter coat. Ralphie also has several large traffic cones, large rubber balls, and large tractor tires that she enjoys playing with.

Ralphie is fed grass hay daily to supplement the grass she grazes. She can eat up to 30 pounds of grasses and hay daily, and drinks 10-15 gallons of water. Her manure is gathered daily and composted. During the summer months, various fly control methods are utilized to combat the nuisance of flies around Ralphie.

In addition to the Ralphie Handlers and coaches, she also has a veterinarian who provides wellness exams and vaccinations. According to the school's official Ralphie website, inspections are conducted annually by the university's Institutional Animal Care and Use Committee. The program's USDA Class C exhibitor's license subjects it to unannounced inspections to ensure compliance with the Animal Welfare Act.

== List of Ralphies ==
Name	Nickname	Place of birth	Born	Debut Run	Final Run	Died	Total Games Run
Ralphie I	Ralph	Sedgewick, CO	November 1965	September 16, 1967	November 18, 1978	May 13, 1982	78
Ralphie II	Moonshine	Longmont, CO	May 25, 1975	November 18, 1978	September 19, 1987	September 19, 1987	53
Ralphie III	Tequila	Laramie, WY	June 3, 1985	November 7, 1987	November 28, 1997	January 20, 1998	73
Ralphie IV	Rowdy	Gallatin Gateway, MT	April 1997	September 5, 1998	August 31, 2008	March 19, 2017	75
Ralphie V	Blackout	Cimarron, NM	October 2006	September 6, 2008	October 5, 2019	–	76
Ralphie VI	Ember	Chadron, NE	May 27, 2020	September 3, 2021	December 28, 2024	–	25
Ralphie VII	Brandy	Steamboat Springs, CO	May 7, 2024	September 20, 2025	–	–	2

== Gallery ==
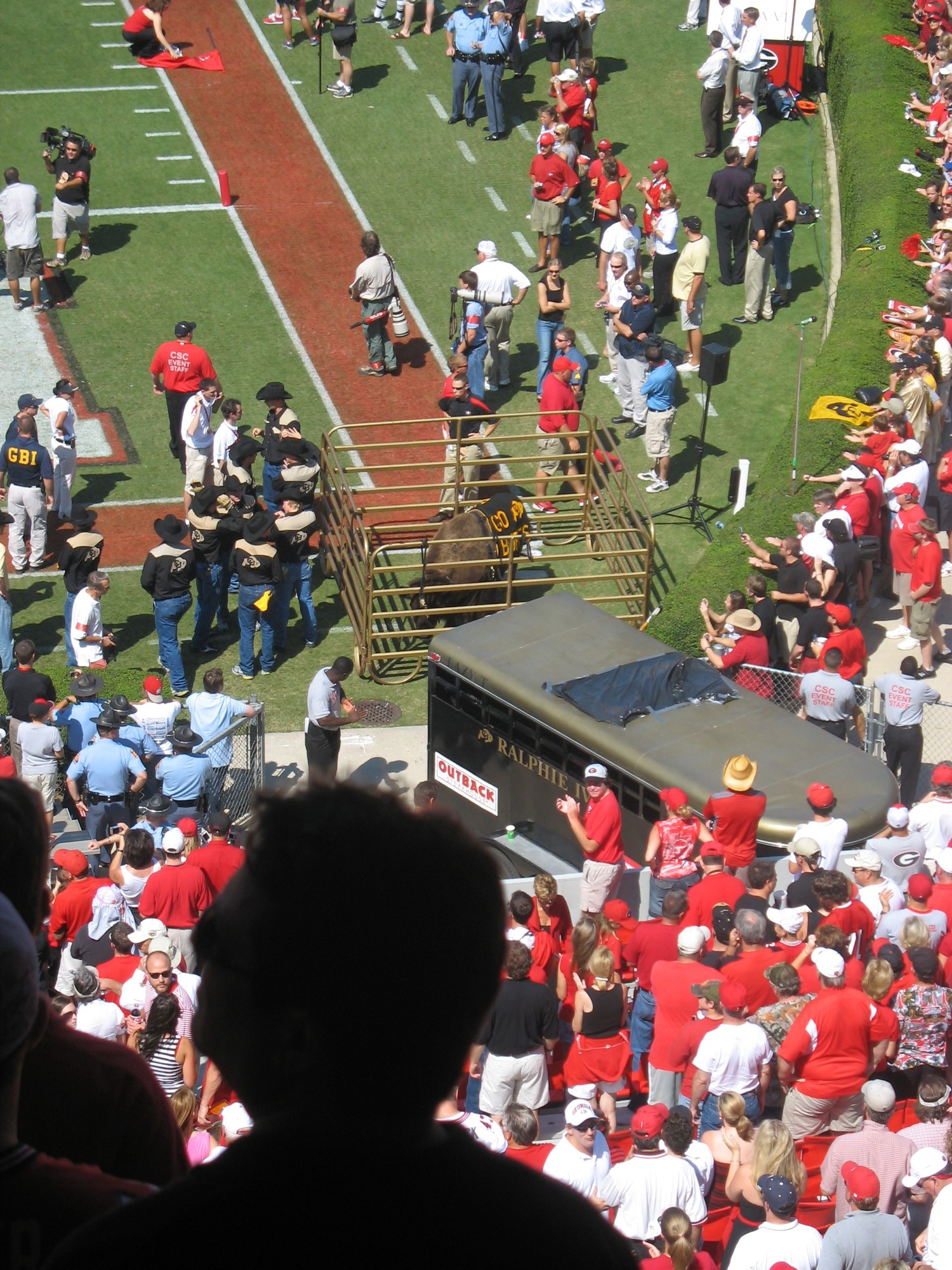
Ralphie IV at a road game in Athens, Georgia

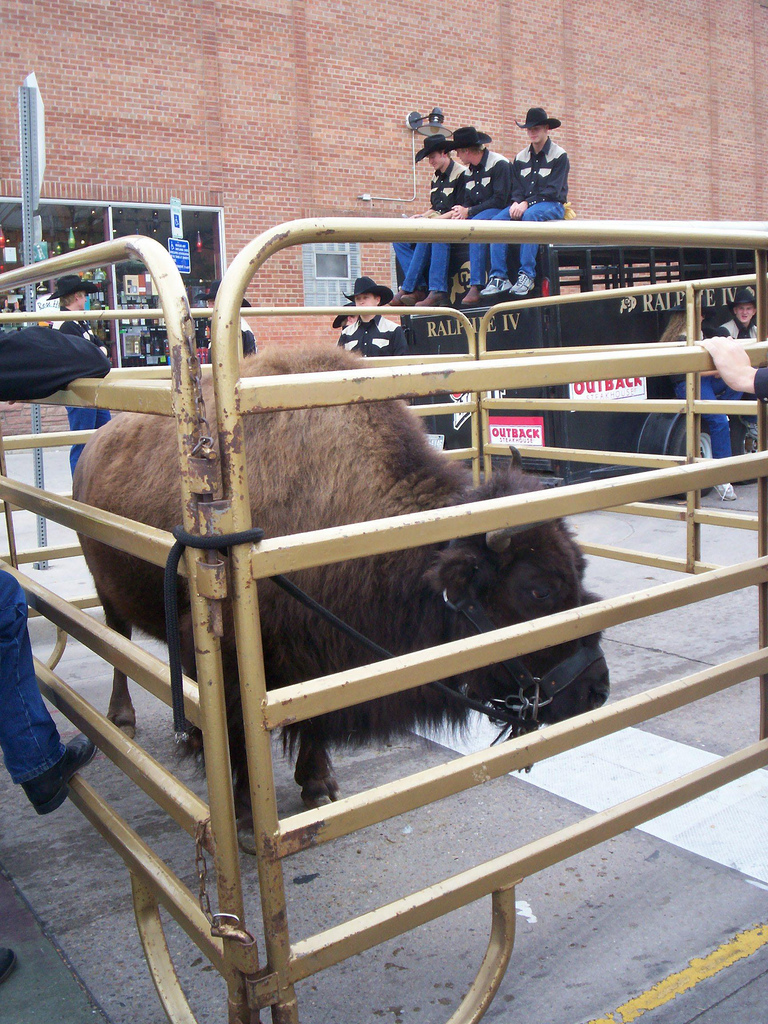
Ralphie IV is made available to the public during the football season.

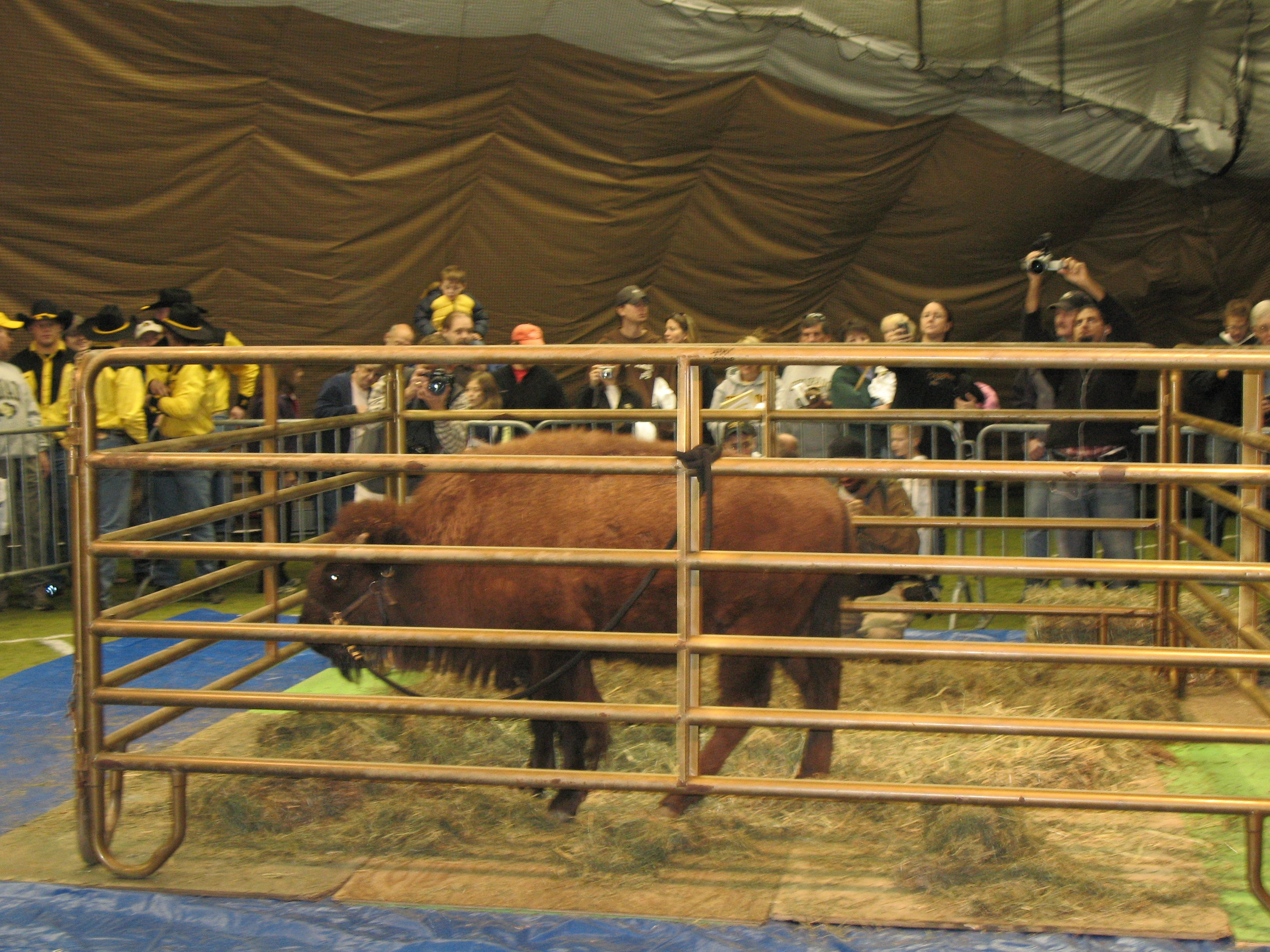
Ralphie V, at her public introduction in 2007.

== See also ==
- Colorado Buffaloes football
- University of Colorado Boulder
- Folsom Field
- Mascot
- American bison
