= Peggy Coppom and Betty Hoover =

Peggy Coppom (born November 19, 1924) and Betty Hoover (November 19, 1924 – August 5, 2020) are identical twins best known for being superfans of the University of Colorado Buffaloes. The two were known as the "CU twins" and started attending games in 1940.

== Early life ==
The two were born in Walsenburg, Colorado in 1924 to Maple and Lester Fitzgerald, and grew up in Haxtun before moving to Boulder in 1940. While growing up, they would dress identically and wouldn't leave the house if it wasn't all the same. They graduated from Boulder High School in 1943. Both attended the University of Colorado, but left after a year and didn't earn degrees.

== Colorado fandom ==
Coppom and Hoover became football season ticket holders in 1958, but were known for cheering on all sports. By 2024 it was estimated that the two had attended 2,500 events across nine sports.

In 2022, Coppom and Hoover became the first inductees to the "Legacy Wing" of CU's Athletic Hall of Honor.

When Deion Sanders became the Buffaloes' coach in 2023, he made it a point to reach out to Coppom and had her perform the opening kickoff for that year's spring game. After Sanders was named Sports Illustrated's 2023 Sportsperson of the Year, Coppom was featured on the cover alongside him.

In 2025, Coppom received the Chancellor’s Impact Award and an honorary degree during Colorado's commencement.

== Personal life ==
Peggy married John Coppom in September 1944, and Betty married Harry Hoover. Both of their husbands served as Army Air Corps pilots during World War II, and both would later fly for United Airlines.

Betty Hoover died in 2020 from pancreatic cancer.

Peggy Coppom crediting her Catholic faith in giving them "stability, peace, tranquility".
