= Columbia Multisport Club =

Triathlon club based in Columbia, Missouri, US

The Columbia Multisport Club is a triathlon club based in Columbia, Missouri. CMC was founded in 2002 by a small group of triathletes and fitness enthusiasts. The group has grown to become one of the largest fitness clubs in Mid-Missouri. With over 200 members, CMC has a diverse membership of recreational athletes and families new to triathlon. The club also has an active youth development program, CMC Kidz, which promotes active, healthy lifestyles for children. Activities such as the Columbia Youth Triathlon, training sessions, and kids aquathlon (swimming and running) gets kids engaged in physical fitness. CMC also gives back to the community through their race: The Jay Dix Challenge to Cure Run & Walk.

The club won the USA Triathlon Division I Club Championship in 2003 and 2004 in Boulder, Colorado. In October 2006, CMC won their third USA Triathlon (USAT) Division I Club Championship at the Land Rover PumpkinMan Triathlon outside Las Vegas, Nevada. The club beat other triathlon clubs from large metropolitan areas including the LA (Los Angeles) Tri Club, the largest triathlon club in the nation. CMC defended its National Championship September 16, 2007 at the USA Triathlon Halfmax National Championship at Innsbrook, Missouri. The Club Championship was held in conjunction with Ultramax Triathlon's Octomax, Quartermax, and Halfmax Triathlons. In 2010 the club traveled to Myrtle Beach, SC., to participate in the USAT Club National Championship. The club won their 5th National Championship beating out the D.C. Tri Club from Washington D.C. Over 80 members and many spectators made the journey to either race or watch the club participate.

In 2011, the Columbia Multisport Club traveled to Myrtle Beach, SC., to participate in the USAT Club National Championship. The club won their 6th USAT Division I National Championship, beating the #2 contender, The DC Tri Club Washington, DC by 136.85 points. After two years of not bringing home the National Championships, in 2014 CMC headed to the Chicago Triathlon in late August. Going up against the Chicago Tri Club, CMC brought over 115 athletes. Although the odds were not in their favor, CMC left Chicago with their 7th USAT Division I National Championship.

September 25 of the following year, the USAT National Championships returned to Innsbrook, Missouri. Despite intense competition from the local Saint Louis Tri Club, CMC claimed their 8th Division I National Championship by a final score of 853 to 836.

On June 25 of 2016, Columbia Multisport Club claimed their 9th USAT Division I National Championship in Loveland CO.
