= Intercollegiate sports team cycling champions =

The competitions to declare intercollegiate champions in cycling in the United States are organized by National Collegiate Cycling Association, a division of USA Cycling.

In the fall of 2016, previous Division I and Division II categories were replaced by varsity and club divisions after many schools launched varsity programs in cycling, a traditionally club sport.

Championships are held in track, mountain biking, cyclocross, BMX, and road disciplines in 11 conferences nationwide, with national championships occurring once a year for each discipline.

Collegiate cycling in the USA is organized into eleven geographic conferences:

- Atlantic Cycling Conference (ACCC)
- Eastern Cycling Conference (ECCC)
- Intermountain Cycling Conference (IMCCC)
- Midwest Cycling Conference (MWCCC)
- North Central Cycling Conference (NCCCC)
- Northwest Cycling Conference (NWCCC)
- Rocky Mountain Cycling Conference (RMCCC)
- Southeast Cycling Conference (SECCC)
- South Central Cycling Conference (SCCCC)
- Southwest Cycling Conference(SWCCC)
- Western Cycling Conference (WCCC)

== Men and Women Combined Scoring ==
Year	Road; Division I	Road; Division II	Track; Division I	Track; Division II	Mountain Bike; Division I	Mountain Bike; Division II	Cyclocross; Division I	Cyclocross; Division II	BMX; Division I	BMX; Division II
1987	-		Penn State							
1988	UC Santa Barbara		Colorado							
1989	Colorado		Penn State							
1990	Colorado		Penn State							
1991	Colorado		Colorado							
1992	Cal Poly - San Luis Obispo		Indiana							
1993	Colorado		Indiana							
1994	UC Davis		Indiana		Fort Lewis College (CO)					
1995	Stanford		Marian College (IN)		Fort Lewis College					
1996	Stanford		Washington		Fort Lewis College		individual			
1997	Stanford		Marian College		Colorado		individual			
1998	Colorado		Marian College		Colorado		individual			
1999	Colorado	US Military Academy	Marian College		Colorado		none			
2000	Colorado	Fort Lewis College	Marian College		Fort Lewis College	Mesa State College (CO)	Lindsey Wilson College			
2001	UC Davis	US Air Force Academy	Marian College		Fort Lewis College	US Air Force Academy	Lindsey Wilson College			
2002	UC Berkeley	Dartmouth	Marian College		Colorado	Union College (KY)	individual			
2003	UC Berkeley	Dartmouth	Marian College		Fort Lewis College	Lees-McRae College (NC)	Fort Lewis College			
2004	UC Berkeley	Dartmouth	Penn State		Fort Lewis College	Lees-McRae College	Fort Lewis College			
2005	Colorado	Whitman College (WA)	Penn State		Colorado	Lees-McRae College	Fort Lewis College			
2006	UC Davis	Whitman College	Marian College	US Military Academy	Fort Lewis College	Western State College (CO)	Lees-McRae College	MIT		
2007	Stanford	Western Washington	Marian College	US Military Academy	Fort Lewis College	Colorado School of Mines	Lees-McRae College	Western Washington		
2008	Lees-McRae College	MIT	Marian College	MIT	Fort Lewis College	Appalachian St. (NC)	Lees-McRae College	Appalachian St.		
2009	UC Davis	Whitman College	Marian University	MIT	Fort Lewis College	Brevard College (NC)	Fort Lewis College	Appalachian St.		
2010	Marian University	Whitman College	Marian University	MIT	Fort Lewis College	Brevard College	Lees-McRae College	Western Washington		
2011	Marian University	Mars Hill College (NC)	Marian University	US Military Academy	Fort Lewis College	Union College (KY)	race shifted from December 2011 to January 2012			
2012	Marian University	MIT	Marian University	MIT	Fort Lewis College	Brevard College	Marian University (tiebreaker)	Mars Hill College	Lindsey Wilson College	
2013	Marian University	MIT	Marian University	Colorado Mesa	Fort Lewis College	Brevard College	Marian University	Brevard College	Marian University (tiebreaker)	
2014	Marian University	Colorado Mesa	Marian University	Colorado Mesa	Colorado	Brevard College	Marian University	Brevard College	Marian University	
2015	Marian University	Milligan College (TN)	Marian University	Milligan College	Fort Lewis College	King University (TN)	Marian University	Brevard College	Marian University	Mars Hill College
2016	Marian University	Milligan College	Varsity Division; Marian University	Club Division; US Military Academy	see below		Marian University	King University	Marian University	Mars Hill College
Year	Road; Varsity	Road; Club	Track; Varsity	Track; Club	see below		Cyclocross; Varsity	Cyclocross; Club	BMX; Varsity	BMX; Club
2017					see below		Brevard College (Note: team relay (no omnium results made available))	Vermont		

== Mountain Bike ==
Year	Varsity		Club	
Year	Division 1	Division 2	Division 1	Division 2
2016	Brevard College	Warren Wilson College	Colorado	MIT

== Overall ==
Year	Overall; Division I	Overall; Division II
2006-07	Lees-McRae College (NC)	US Military Academy
2007-08	Fort Lewis College (CO)	MIT
2008-09	Lees-McRae College	MIT
2009-10		
2010-11		
2011-12		
2012-13		
2013-14		
2014-15		
2015-16		
Year	Varsity	Club
2016-17		
2017-18		
2018-19	DI: Marian University; DII: SCAD-Savannah	Colorado State
2019-20	Colorado Mesa	Colorado
2021-22	Colorado Mesa	Arizona
2022-23	Colorado Mesa	Colorado State
2023-24	Colorado Mesa	Colorado
2024-25	Colorado Mesa	Colorado State
