= Colorado Crew =

Collegiate sports club at the University of Colorado–Boulder

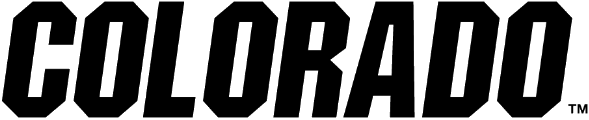
- Motto: Only the Strong Survive
- Location: Boulder, Colorado
- Home water: Boulder Reservoir
- Founded: 1992
- Key people: Trevor Jones (Women's Coach)
- University: University of Colorado Boulder
- Affiliations: American Collegiate Rowing
- Website: colorado.edu/crew

Colorado Crew is the collegiate sports club that represents the University of Colorado Boulder in rowing at a national level. The program was founded in the fall of 1992 by two transfer students from the University of San Diego. Since its founding, the team, in terms of membership and funding, has established itself as one of the largest club sports at the University of Colorado. The men's and women's programs compete in the American Collegiate Rowing Association (ACRA).

== Location ==
Colorado Crew trains on the Boulder Reservoir in Boulder, Colorado. All dry land training is conducted in the University of Colorado's Recreation Center.
