= USA Triathlon =

Sports governing body in the United States

- IOC nation: USA
- Sport: Triathlon
- Official website: usatriathlon.org
- Year of formation: 1982
- International federation: World Triathlon
- National Olympic Committee: United States Olympic & Paralympic Committee

USA Triathlon (USAT) is the national governing body for the multisport disciplines of triathlon, duathlon, aquathlon and winter triathlon in the United States. USA Triathlon is a member federation of the U.S. Olympic & Paralympic Committee and World Triathlon. Victoria Brumfield is the Chief Executive Officer and Henry Brandon is the Chair of the Board of Directors. Its headquarters are in Colorado Springs, Colorado.

USA Triathlon sanctions more than 4,300 races every year with nearly 400,000 members. It is composed of athletes of all ages, coaches, officials, parents and fans working to strengthen multisport.

USA Triathlon coordinates and sanctions grassroots and elite multisport events across the country and works to create interest and participation in those programs.

On the elite level, USA Triathlon is responsible for the selection and training of teams to represent the United States in international competition, including the world championships, Pan American Games, Olympic and Paralympic Games. It conducts national camps and clinics and provides coaching education programs.

On the developmental level, USA Triathlon fosters grassroots expansion of the sport, which is facilitated by the sanctioning of age-group events and triathlon clubs. National Championship events are held for athletes of all ages, including youth and junior athletes. USA Triathlon's marquee event each year is its Age Group National Championships, held annually since 1982. Each year, the USA Triathlon Age Group National Championships draws over 5,000 registered participants.

USA Triathlon's mission is to grow and inspire the triathlon community. USA Triathlon's vision is to provide the resources required for all in the triathlon community to reach their full potential.

== Membership ==
USA Triathlon is a member-based organization founded in 1982. USA Triathlon has seen steady membership growth since 1995, impacted greatly by the addition of triathlon to the Olympic Games in 2000.

Among USA Triathlon's constituent groups are certified coaches, certified race directors, certified officials, and certified clubs.

== Initiatives ==
The USA Triathlon Hall of Fame was founded in 2008, and recognizes contributors to triathlon going back to the beginning of the sport.

USA Triathlon is continually creating opportunities to make triathlon accessible to new audiences. In 2012, USA Triathlon created its Splash & Dash Youth Aquathlon Series to encourage children ages 7–15 to participate in multisport. The swim-run events are set distances based on age, and focus on fun and participation rather than competition. Most events are not timed.

In January 2014, USA Triathlon celebrated the overwhelming support from Division I, II and III representatives at the NCAA Convention, who voted to add triathlon an Emerging Sport for Women.

In 2021, USA Triathlon was honored by the United States Olympic & Paralympic Committee with the Diversity, Equity & Inclusion Choice Award, the fourth time the organization has been honored by the USOPC for its diversity and inclusion efforts since 2017.
