= University of Colorado Golden Buffalo Marching Band =

Marching band of Colorado Boulder

University of Colorado Boulder Golden Buffalo Marching Band
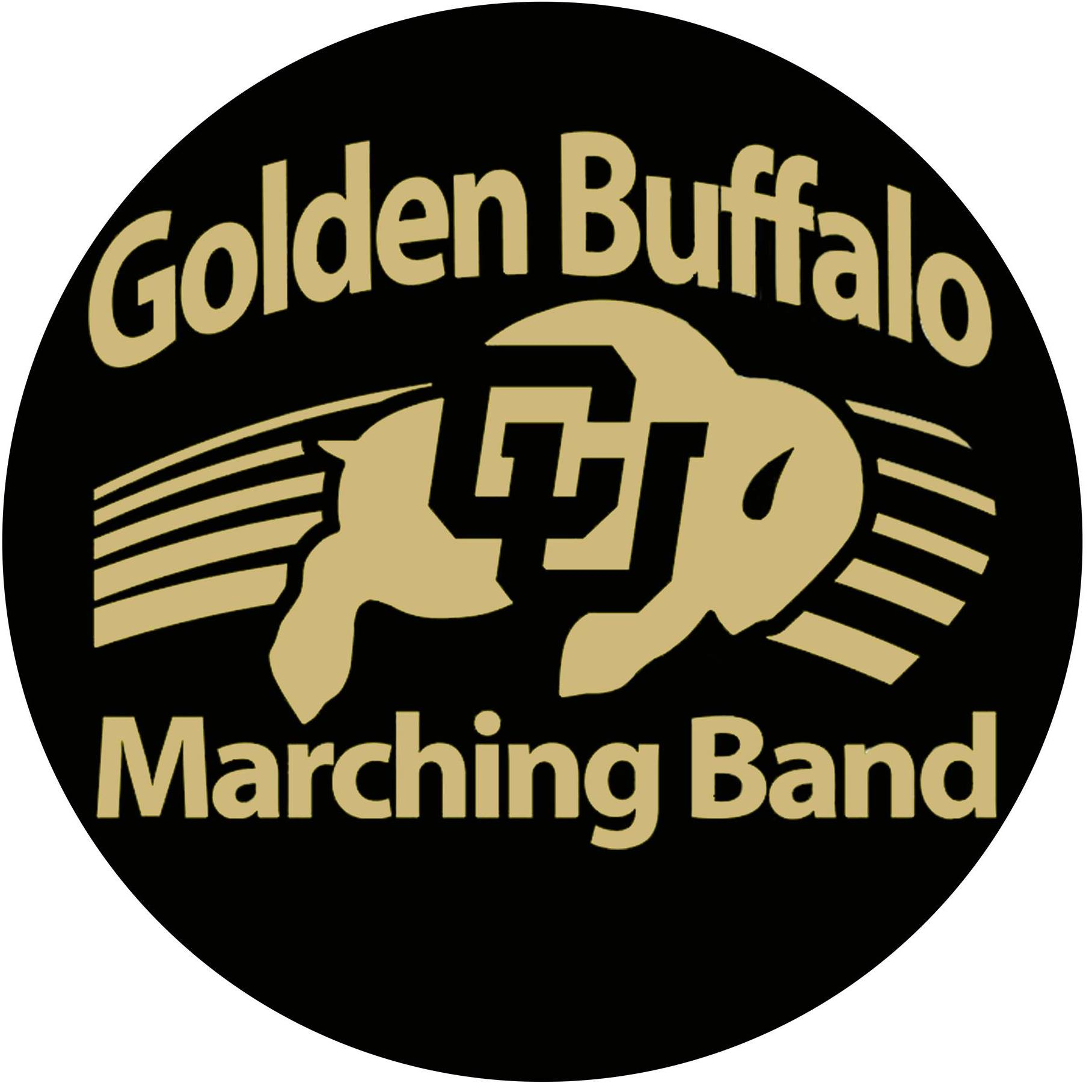
- School: University of Colorado Boulder
- Location: Boulder, Colorado
- Conference: Big 12 Conference
- Founded: 1909
- Director: Logan Sorey
- Assistant Director: Andrew Keiser
- Members: ~280
- Practice field: Farrand Field
- Website: colorado.edu/music/marching-band

The Golden Buffalo Marching Band (or GBMB) is the marching band of the University of Colorado Boulder. The band consists of ~260 members, composed of both non-music and music majors. The band performs at all home Colorado football games at Folsom Field, Pearl Street Stampedes the night before every home game, and bowl games. The GBMB will send smaller ensembles to select away games and will occasionally perform at local and university events.

== Uniform ==
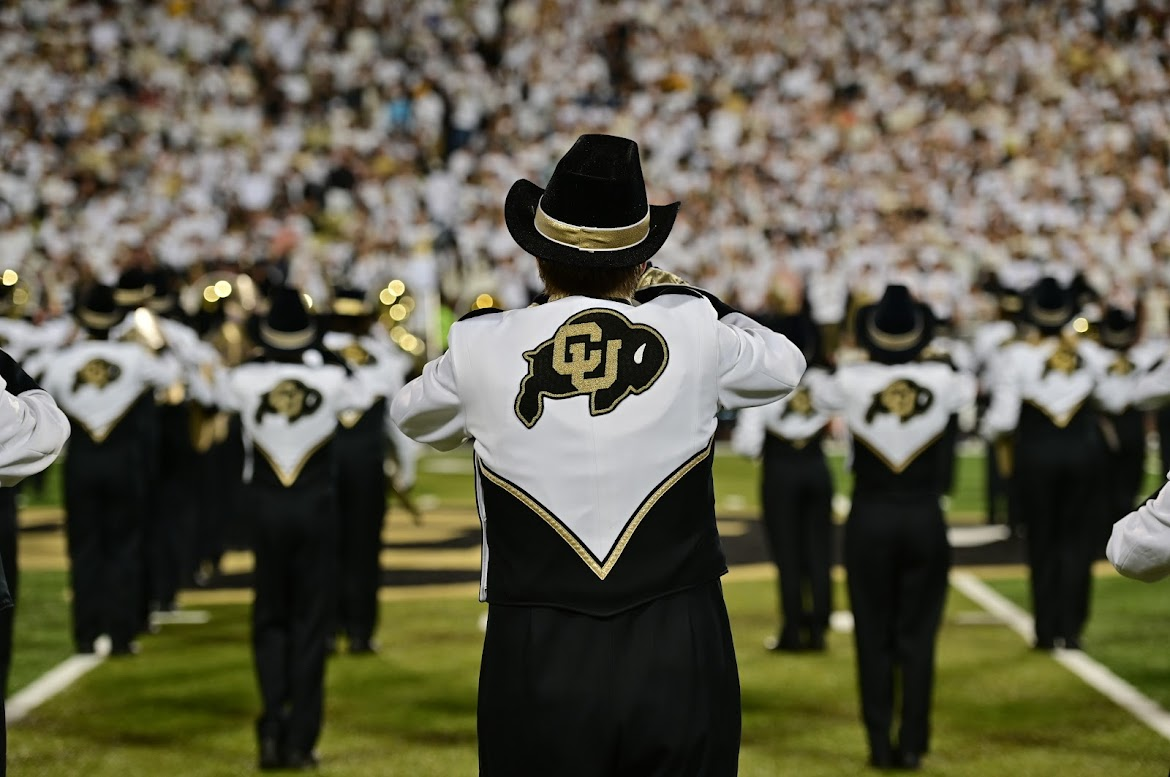
Close-up view from within the band during a pregame performance in 2025.

The current performance uniform for a regular member of the GBMB utilizes a wool jacket with a white upper half and a black lower half. The jacket contains black and gold collars and shoulder buttons/straps. The CU Buffs logo embroidered on the back is a feature of the uniform, along with a gold and silver design on the front that resembles the Boulder Flatirons with a black CU logo on the front. The sleeves of the jacket are white with a ghost CU Buffs logo on the upper arm. The pants are made of wool and are entirely black. Black and gold gauntlets are used with the word "Colorado" spelled in black on the gold part, along with black gloves and shoes. The black cowboy hat with a silver and gold band is the most recognizable part of the uniform. When in the stands, the band takes off their gauntlets, gloves, and cowboy hats and replaces the hats with white CU baseball caps. In instances of extreme heat, the band will take off their jackets to reveal white GBMB t-shirts when in the stands. Drum major uniforms are altered to denote their rank.

During inclement weather, the GBMB can utilize their rain gear, which is a thick full-body jacket with wool on the inside and a waterproof material on the exterior. The rain gear is all black with yellow inside the hood and yellow CU Buffs logos. During Pearl Street Stampedes and minor events, the GBMB will wear their 'Stampede Gear,' which consists of a CU track suit and the white CU baseball cap.

GBMB members are allowed to have long hair as long as it can be tucked either in the hat or worn in a ponytail or braids. Members may also wear CU temporary tattoos or CU colored makeup/glitter on gamedays only. During gameday rehearsals and other performances, members of the GBMB are not allowed to wear any red or green, as it is seen as showing support for the University of Nebraska and Colorado State University respectively, both rivals of CU.

== Personnel ==
=== Instrumentation ===
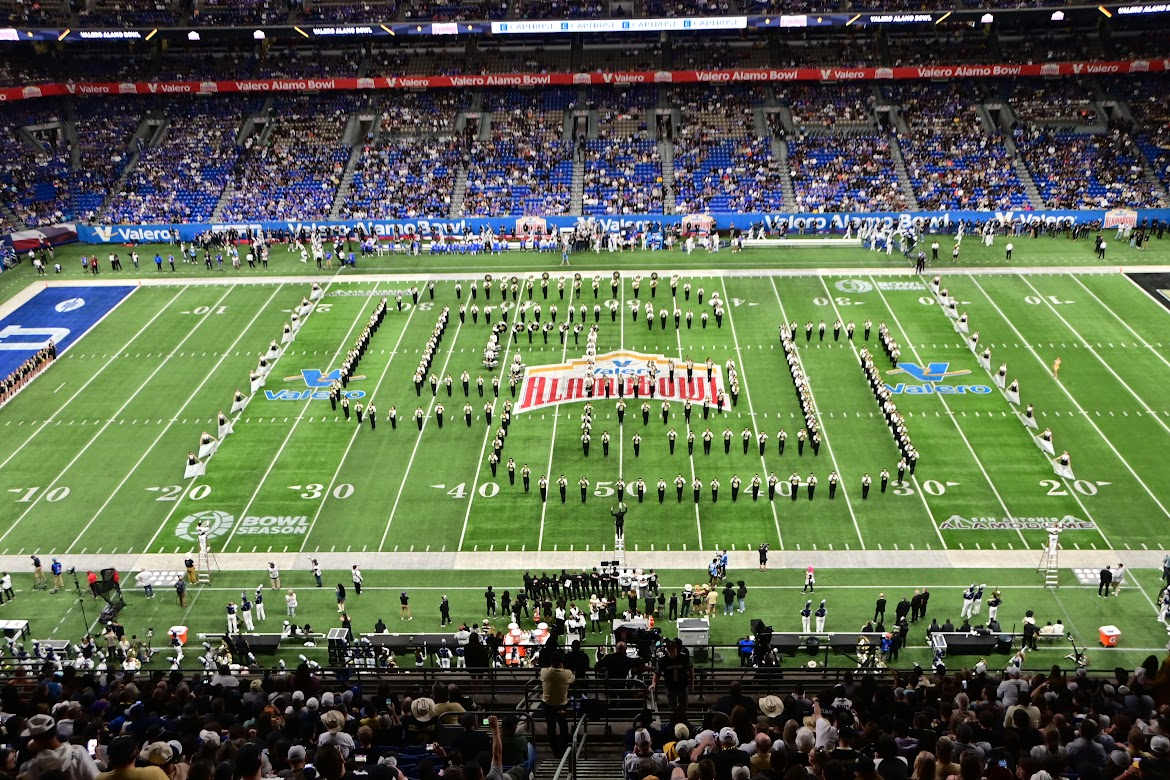
The band during a pregame performance in the 2024 Alamo Bowl.

There are 11 sections within the GBMB: piccolos, clarinets, alto saxophones, tenor saxophones, mellophones, trumpets, trombones, baritones, sousaphones, color guard, and the drumline that consists of snare drums, bass drums, tenor drums, and cymbals.

Each instrumental section is led by a section leader, with the color guard being led by a guard captain. Some larger sections, like the trumpets and trombones, can have multiple section leaders. Section leaders are responsible for most tasks relating to their respective sections, including teaching of marching fundamentals and music, logistics, and personnel management. Section leaders conduct warm-ups along with sectional rehearsals. Section leaders are typically more senior members of the GBMB and undergo an audition and interview process to be selected. Section leaders also fulfil the responsibilities of a squad leader.

Each section is split up into smaller squads, with each squad being led by a squad leader. Squad leaders are present within every section and assist the section leader in leading and organizing the section. Squads are not distinct from the sections and are just a way to organize a section into smaller pieces.

=== Drum majors ===
The drum major is the highest-ranked position that a member can achieve within the GBMB. The GBMB has 3 drum majors that can be recognized by their white pants, cowboy hats, gloves, and shoes (as opposed to the black articles for regular members). Drum majors are also given black visors in place of the white baseball caps for regular members. In addition to conducting the band during performances, drum majors are responsible for instructing the band throughout the season and coordinating between the section leaders. The drum majors further perform a choreographed dance before each halftime performance and can often be seen running across the field during the pregame run on.

=== Feature twirlers ===
The GBMB is a band that features baton twirlers. The twirlers perform choreographed routines during pregame, halftime, and stampedes. The current feature twirlers are Izzy Pell and Ryleigh Richards.

Every year, the feature twirlers host the "Twirler for a day" event where a certain number of younger twirlers of varying ages get to perform with the GBMB and the twirlers during a home game.

=== Buff Basketball Band ===
This group consists of over 100 select musicians that perform for CU Men's and Women's Basketball home games at CU Events Center. The group has also traveled with the teams to Big-12 Conference and NCAA tournaments. The ensemble is open to any CU student who participated in the Golden Buffalo Marching Band in the fall. Performance opportunities on the drum set and electric bass are open to all students on campus through an audition process held in September of each year. Alumni band members are usually welcome to play with the basketball band during winter break games, with the prerequisite of having marched in the marching band during their college career at CU.

=== Staff and administration ===
In addition to the leadership positions within the GBMB, there are a number of positions that support the GBMB and their operations. Some positions are available to members of the GBMB.

The director Golden Buffalo Marching Band is also the Associate Director of Bands for the CU College of Music. The current director is Dr. Logan Sorey. The GBMB assistant director is also the Assistant Director of Bands for the CU College of Music, along with being the director of the Buff Basketball Band. The current assistant director is Dr. Andrew Keiser. Both the director and assistant director coordinate the band as a whole, write drill, and perform a number of other administrative and technical tasks. The GBMB has graduate teaching assistants. These assistants are graduate students within the CU College of Music and are responsible for assisting the directors in their tasks along with providing instruction to the members of the GBMB.

There is a number of staff positions that support the GBMB which include an ensembles assistant, drumline instructors, color guard instructors, a uniform coordinator, a gameday equipment crew coordinator, an announcer, a videographer, and a photographer.

In addition to the regular staff, there are a number of positions open to members of the GBMB. These positions include: new member advisors, librarians, equipment staff, and a social media liaison.

== Fight Songs ==
=== Glory Colorado ===
Glory, glory Colorado
Glory, glory Colorado
Glory, glory Colorado
Hurray for the Silver and the Gold!
(repeat)

=== Go Colorado ===
Away we go, go buffalo
We want a Colorado victory
Show them we're out to win this game
Come on Colorado push on to fame
Fight for the Silver, Fight for the Gold
Give a rousing cheer (WooHoo!)
Hey buffalo, we're gonna show
Go Colorado, Lets go!

=== Fight CU ===
Fight CU down the field
CU must win
Fight, fight for victory
CU knows no defeat
We'll roll up a mighty score
Never give in
Shoulder to shoulder
We will Fight, Fight
Fight, Fight, Fight!
